= Karelian Front =

Red Army group on the Eastern Front of World War II

- Active: August 1941 – 1945
- Country: Soviet Union
- Branch: Workers' and Peasants' Red Army
- Type: Army Group Command
- Role: Co-ordination and conduct of Red Army operations north of Lake Ladoga and in the Arctic
- Size: 2 field armies
- Engagements: Svir-Petrozavodsk Operation; Petsamo-Kirkenes Operation

Commanders
- Notable commanders: Marshal of the Soviet Union K.A. Meretskov

Military operations in spring/summer 1941; the Karelian Front is in the centre of the image, north of Lake Onega.

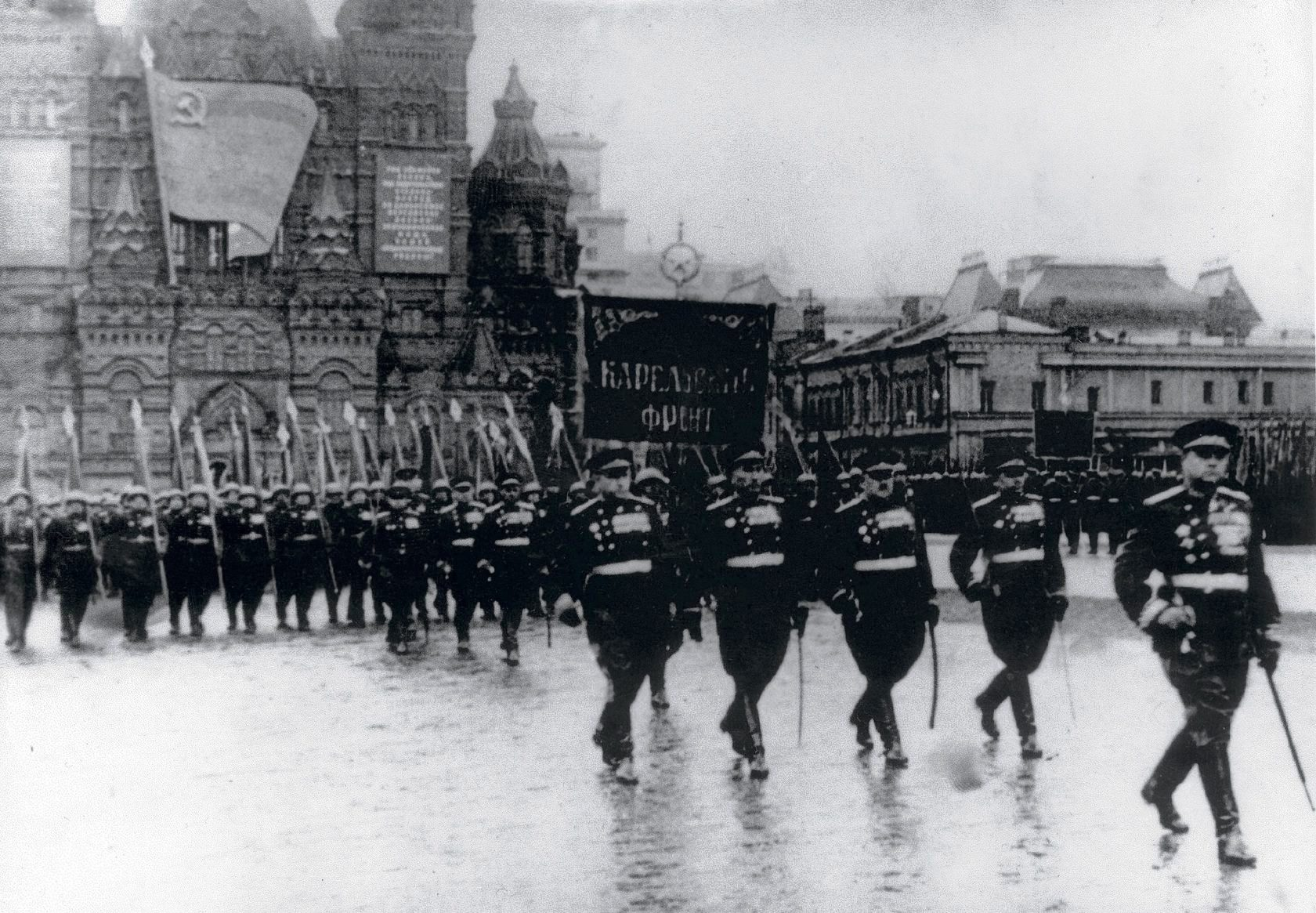
The combined regiment of the Karelian Front at the 1945 Moscow Victory Parade headed by Marshal Kirill Meretskov

The Karelian Front (Russian: Карельский фронт, romanized: Karelskiy front) was a front (army group) of the Soviet Union's Red Army during World War II, and operated in Karelia.

== Wartime ==
The Karelian Front was created in August 1941 when Northern Front was split into Karelian Front and Leningrad Front to take account of the different military developments and requirements on the Leningrad approaches versus those along the Finnish border to the Arctic. It remained in existence until the end of the war.

The front covered the sector north of Lake Ladoga and the Svir River to the Arctic Coast near Murmansk. It was involved in combat with both Finnish and German forces along the Soviet-Finnish border. The front between Lake Ladoga and Lake Onega was split off to the independent 7th Army during the static phase of the war.

During 1944, the Karelian Front participated with the Leningrad Front in the final offensive against Finland which led to the Soviet-Finnish armistice. In October 1944 the Petsamo-Kirkenes Operation was conducted along the front, capturing some parts of northern Finland and liberating the easternmost parts of the Norwegian Finnmark province from German occupation.

The Karelian Front in the Petsamo-Kirkenes Operation conducted the only successful major military operation ever undertaken in an Arctic environment in modern warfare. The experiences in the conduct of the operation, particularly in terms of organising rear-area services and supply, were considered important to the conduct of the Red Army's offensive against the Japanese Kwantung Army in Manchuria, and many leading officers were transferred from Karelian Front to the Baikal Theatre of War.

== Order of battle ==
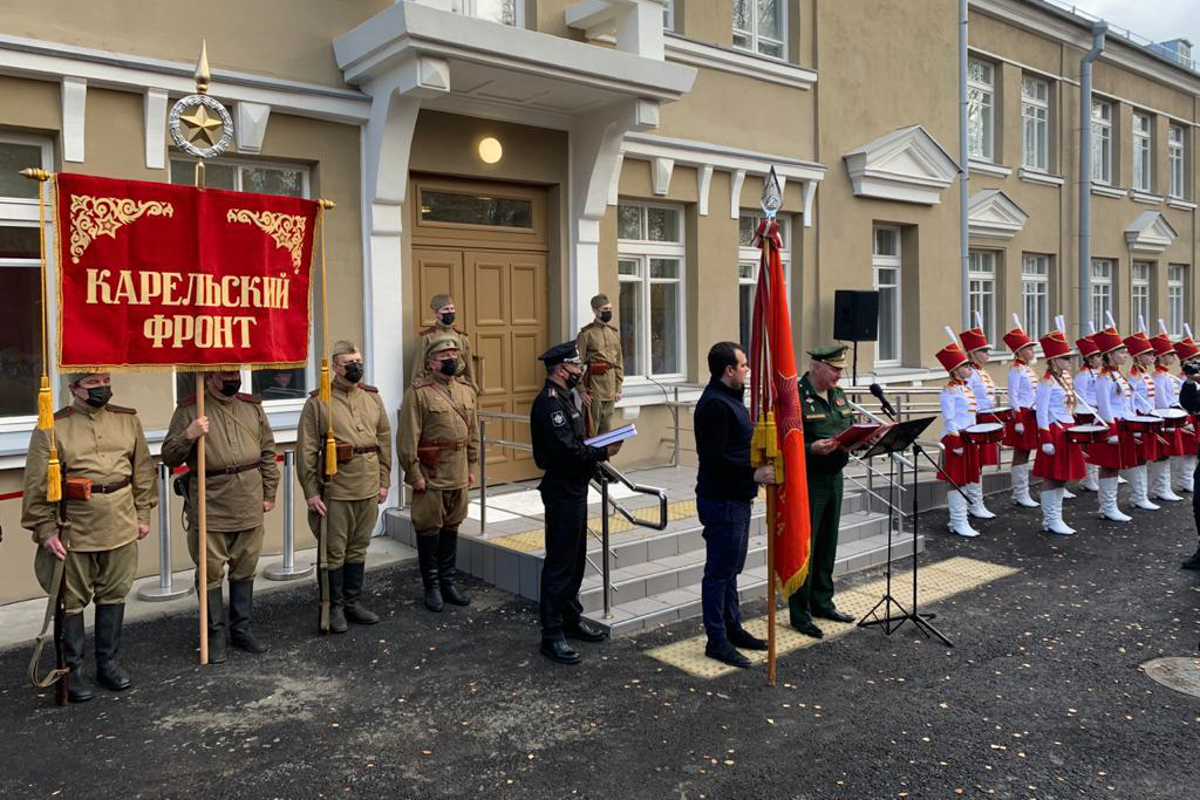
The Museum of the Karelian Front in Medvezhyegorsk opened in 2020.

Order of battle of the Karelian Front on 1 September 1944:

- 7th Army (Alexey Nikolayevich Krutikov)
  - 4th Rifle Corps (4 ск) (114th, 272nd Rifle Divisions)
  - 99th Rifle Corps (18th, 65th, 310th Rifle Divisions)
  - 30th, 32nd Ski Brigades
  - 150th, 162nd Fortified Areas
  - 149th, 633rd, 1942nd Corps Artillery Regiment
  - 989th Howitzer Artillery Regiment
- 14th Army (Vladimir Shcherbakov)
  - 126th Light Mountain Rifle Corps (72nd Naval Rifle Brigade, 31st Ski Brigade))
  - 10th Guards Rifle Division
  - 14th Rifle Division (Soviet Union)
  - 2nd Fortified Region
- 19th Army (Georgy Kozlov)
  - 21st Rifle Division
  - 67th Rifle Division
  - 104th Rifle Division
  - 122nd Rifle Division
  - 341st Rifle Division
  - 38th Guards Tank Brigade
  - 73rd Guards Separate Tank Regiment
  - 88th Separate Tank Regiment
- 26th Army (Lev Skvirsky)
  - 31st Rifle Corps (83rd, 205th Rifle Divisions)
  - 132nd Rifle Corps (54th, 367th Rifle Divisions)
  - 45th Rifle Division
- 32nd Army (Filipp D. Gorelenko)
  - 127th Light Mountain Rifle Corps (127 лгск) (27th Rifle Division)
  - HQ 131st Rifle Corps
  - 176th Rifle Division
  - 289th Rifle Division
  - 313th Rifle Division
  - 368th Rifle Division
  - 3rd Naval Infantry Brigade
  - 69th, 70th Naval Rifle Brigades
  - 33rd Ski Brigade
  - 31st Separate Naval Infantry Battalion
- 7th Air Army (Ivan Sokolov)
  - 1st Guards Mixed Aviation Division
  - 257th, 260th, 261st Mixed Aviation Divisions
  - 324th Fighter Aviation Division
  - 858th Fighter Aviation Regiment
  - 204th Fire Correction and Reconnaissance Aviation Regiment
  - 121st Separate Communications Aviation Regiment
  - 108th Reconnaissance Aviation Squadron
  - 119th Reconnaissance Aviation Squadron
  - 118th Long-Range Reconnaissance Aviation Squadron

== Major operations ==
- Svir-Petrozavodsk Operation against Finland, July–August 1944
- Petsamo-Kirkenes Operation against the Wehrmacht, October 1944

== Commanders ==
- Colonel-General Valerian Frolov (September 1941 – February 1944)
- Marshal of the Soviet Union (as of October 1944) K. A. Meretskov (February 1944 – May 1945)

== See also ==
- 6th SS Mountain Division Nord
