= 176th Rifle Division =

176th Rifle Division (September 1939 - October 9, 1943) 176th Rifle Division (February 12, 1944 - July 1945)
- Active: 1939–1945
- Country: Soviet Union
- Branch: Red Army
- Type: Infantry
- Size: Division
- Engagements: Operation Barbarossa; Donbas–Rostov strategic defensive operation Rostov Defensive Operation; Battle of Rostov (1941); Case Blue; Battle of the Caucasus; Kuban Bridgehead; Battle of Novorossiysk; Continuation War; Svir-Petrozavodsk Operation; Battle of Ilomantsi; East Prussian Offensive; Prague Offensive
- Decorations: Order of the Red Banner (1st formation); Order of Suvorov (2nd formation)
- Battle honours: Masurian (2nd formation)

Commanders
- Notable commanders: Maj. Gen. Vladimir Nikolaevich Martsinkevich; Col. Ivan Andreevich Rubaniyuk; Maj. Gen. Sergei Mikhailovich Bushev; Col. Aleksei Grigorevich Kaverin; Maj. Gen. Vasilii Ivanovich Zolotarev

The 176th Rifle Division was an infantry division of the Red Army, originally formed as part of the prewar buildup of forces, based on the shtat (table of organization and equipment) of September 13, 1939. The division completed its formation at Kryvyi Rih in the Odessa Military District and at the time of the German invasion of the Soviet Union was in the same area, assigned to the 35th Rifle Corps. Being relatively far from the frontier it escaped the early disasters and retreated mostly in good order through southern Ukraine into the autumn as part of 9th Army. It then took part in the counteroffensive against the overextended German Army Group South that liberated Rostov-na-Donu for the first time in December. When Army Group A began its summer offensive in 1942 the 176th fell back into the Caucasus region, losing much of its strength in the process, but finally helping to take up a firm defense along the Terek River and finally in front of Ordzhonikidze. As a result of this fighting the division, along with its artillery regiment, were awarded the Order of the Red Banner. After the German 6th Army was surrounded at Stalingrad the 176th advanced into the western Caucasus and entered the so-called Malaya Zemlya bridgehead south of Novorossiysk in the spring of 1943 where it helped to defeat the German Operation Neptun in April and in the autumn took part in the liberation of the city, for which it was redesignated as the 129th Guards Rifle Division.

A new 176th was formed in the 32nd Army of Karelian Front in February 1944 based on a pair of naval rifle brigades. In late July it advanced on the Finnish town of Ilomantsi but was soon surrounded and forced to break out with heavy losses. Following this fiasco the division was moved southwest to join the 36th Rifle Corps which was in 31st Army at the start of the Vistula-Oder Offensive in January 1945. It the course of the fighting in East Prussia it received a battle honor and a decoration before moving with this Army to the Czechoslovak border region and ending the war advancing toward Prague. It was disbanded within months of the German surrender.

== 1st Formation ==
The division was formed from the 123rd Rifle Regiment of the 41st Rifle Division during the 1939 Soviet invasion of Poland. The rifle regiments of the 176th formed at Nikopol while the artillery units formed at Kryvyi Rih. The cadre of the 123rd made up 30 percent of the division while the rest were mobilized reservists. Kombrig Dmitry Averin became division commander. On 28 September the newly formed division was relocated to Starokostiantyniv and entered the reserve of the Ukrainian Front. The division did not participate in the invasion and returned to Nikopol in late October where it demobilized the reservists. Over the following months it was brought back up to strength with fresh conscripts, and dispatched troops to the Winter War as replacements in January. On 27 January 1940 the division relocated to the area of Kotovsk and Ananiv in Odessa Oblast, near the Romanian border, and on 23 April the 591st Rifle Regiment was relocated to Balta. The division participated in the Soviet occupation of Bessarabia in June and July. After the end of the operation it was garrisoned in the area of Beltsy. Col. Vladimir Nikolaevich Martsinkevich was appointed to command the division on 16 July 1940. This officer had previously commanded the 173rd Rifle Division in the Winter War and would be promoted to the rank of major general on 9 November 1941. On June 22 the 176th was in 9th Army's 35th Rifle Corps with the 95th Rifle Division; the 9th was at the time a separate Army unassigned to any Front.

As of June 22, 1941 it had the following order of battle:

- 389th Rifle Regiment
- 404th Rifle Regiment
- 591st Rifle Regiment
- 300th Artillery Regiment
- 380th Howitzer Artillery Regiment
- 188th Antitank Battalion
- 433rd Antiaircraft Battery (later 203rd Antiaircraft Battalion)
- 128th Reconnaissance Company (later 128th Reconnaissance Battalion)
- 166th Sapper Battalion
- 197th Signal Battalion (later 1450th Signal Company)
- 141st Medical/Sanitation Battalion
- 12th Chemical Defense (Anti-gas) Company
- 152nd Motor Transport Company
- 264th Field Bakery (later 103rd Motorized Field Bakery)
- 287th Divisional Veterinary Hospital
- 1555th (later 451st) Field Postal Station
- 288th Field Office of the State Bank

== Battles in Ukraine ==
By July 1 the division had been shifted to the 48th Rifle Corps, still in 9th Army which was now part of Southern Front (formerly Odessa Military District). A few days later it incorporated five battalions of militia plus survivors of the 2nd and 23rd Border Guards that had retreated from the frontier. The 176th remained with 9th Army, retreating across the southern Ukraine until October while the main forces of Army Group South were focused on the encirclement battle east of Kiev. As of the start of September it was a separate division within 9th Army and during October it was withdrawn into the Front reserves; the 380th Howitzer Regiment was removed from the division on October 14. In November and December the 176th played a prominent role in Southern Front's successful counteroffensive at Rostov-na-Donu and the ensuing winter campaign of 1941–42. At the beginning of December it was directly under command of the Front, but during that month it was moved to 12th Army of the same Front where it remained until March 1942 when it returned to Front reserves.

== Battle of the Caucasus ==
On July 7 the German 1st Panzer and 17th Armies of Army Group A launched their part of Case Blue, the summer offensive into southern Russia and the Caucasus Mountains. At this time the 176th was back in 12th Army, still in Southern Front. Just after the offensive began General Martsinkevich was moved to command of the 24th Army of the same Front; he would go on to command 9th Army in August but was removed for "failure to take decisive measures" against German bridgeheads south of the Terek River. After further military education he was given command of the 134th Rifle Division. He was killed in an air attack while directing a crossing of the Vistula River on July 30, 1944, and was posthumously made a Hero of the Soviet Union. He was replaced in command of the 176th by Col. Ivan Andreevich Rubaniyuk, who had been in command of the 591st Rifle Regiment from November into February and had since been serving as the division's deputy commander.

In the first weeks of the German offensive the 12th Army was forced back from its positions along the lower Don River and by July 25 the division, now described as "remnants", was helping to hold a 40 km-wide sector from Kiziterinka (20 km southeast of Rostov) eastward to Belianin (50 km southeast of Rostov) opposite the 1st Panzer Army's III Panzer Corps. By the beginning of August 12th Army had been subordinated to the Don Operational Group of North Caucasus Front; the 109th Rifle Regiment of 74th Rifle Division was also serving in 12th Army at this time. Army Group A was reorganized on August 17 after which 1st Panzer Army was ordered to advance southeast parallel to the Caucasus Mountains with the objective to seize the Terek River valley, the key cities of Ordzhonikidze and Grozny, and ultimately the oil fields at Baku.

The previous day the 23rd and 3rd Panzer Divisions of XXXX Panzer Corps renewed their offensive in the direction of Mozdok. At this time the 176th had been re-subordinated to the 9th Army and was positioned in its first echelon which was along the Terek from Prokhladny eastward past Mozdok. The 3rd Panzer Division reached the northern bank of the Terek in the Mozdok region late on August 23 and captured the city two days later. After a week of confused fighting the 1st Panzer Army soon came to a virtual standstill and the Soviet defenses began reorganizing. General Martsinkevich was replaced but the forces of 9th Army continued to hold the south bank of the Terek, apart from two German-held bridgeheads.

=== Battles along the Terek ===
By the beginning of September it was noted that the personnel of the division were roughly 30-40 percent of various Caucasian nationalities. At this time the 9th Army consisted of the 176th, 151st, 389th and 417th Rifle Divisions, 62nd Naval Rifle Brigade and the 11th Guards Rifle Corps, continuing to defend the Terek from south of Prokhladny eastward to south of Mozdok to just northwest of Grozny. It was tasked with preventing the German LII Army Corps and 13th Panzer Division from crossing the river and advancing on Ordzhonikidze. LII Corps began its attack at 0200 hours on September 2, attempting to thrust across the Terek against the positions of 11th Guards Corps. In two days of see-saw fighting the German force, backed by tanks of the 23rd Panzer Division, managed to secure a bridgehead nearly 3 km deep. On September 6 a mixed battlegroup from the two panzer divisions with about 40 tanks drove a deep wedge between the 9th and 8th Guards Rifle Brigades, but as it approached the northern foothills of the Terek Mountains it encountered intense artillery, Katyusha and antitank fire as well as heavy counterattacks by Soviet forces, bringing them to a temporary halt.

1st Panzer Army's commander, Gen. E. von Kleist, gave orders to the 5th SS Panzergrenadier Division Wiking on September 22 to advance eastward through the Terek Mountains toward either Grozny or Ordzhonikidze in cooperation with the 111th Infantry Division. Unbeknownst to Kleist part of the 176th, along with the 52nd Tank and 59th Rifle Brigades and the 75th Tank Battalion, had been concentrated for a counterattack against a perceived weak spot in the 111th's defenses in the Alkhan-Churt valley. As a result, the attack of the 5th SS ran straight into this battle group, leading to a fight that lasted most of a week before the assault collapsed in the face of fierce Soviet resistance, with both German divisions suffering heavy casualties, especially from antitank fire. Kleist blamed the failure on poor internal cohesion within the 5th SS but then on October 3 pleaded with the high command for substantial reinforcements before he could resume his advance. Meanwhile, the commander of Transcaucasian Front recommended to the STAVKA that his Northern Group of Forces, to which 9th Army belonged at this time, go over to the defensive, which was accepted on September 29.

By October 23 it appeared to the commander of the Northern Group, Lt. Gen. I. I. Maslennikov, that the German panzer army remained a spent force and he was proposing a counterattack with a group that would include the 176th. In the event this was forestalled two days later when the "spent" Germans launched a renewed drive to the southwest and then to the east; this attack was halted at the gates of Ordzhonikidze on November 5. On October 13 Colonel Rubaniyuk was moved to command of the 11th Rifle Corps, being replaced by Col. Vasilii Vasilievich Glagolev. Rubaniyuk went on to command the 10th Guards and 20th Guards Rifle Corps and reached the rank of colonel general postwar. On November 19 Glagolev took over the 10th Guards Corps and was replaced by Col. Sergei Mikhailovich Bushev who came over from the 10th Rifle Brigade; this officer would be awarded the rank of major general on April 21, 1943, and would lead the 176th for the duration of its 1st formation. In recognition of its successes in the fighting against 1st Panzer Army near Mozdok and Ordzhonikidze, on December 13 the division, as well as its 300th Artillery Regiment, would each be awarded the Order of the Red Banner. This was an unusual distinction so early in the war especially for a divisional subunit.

== Into the Western Caucasus ==
As of the start of December the 176th had left 9th Army and was under the direct command of the Northern Group of Forces. Later in the month it was moved to 58th Army, still in the Northern Group. This Army began advancing westward on December 11 from a line with Malgobek on the Terek on the right (north) flank to west of Illarionovka where it linked with 9th Army; the division was in the second echelon. 58th Army largely faced the 50th Infantry Division of LII Army Corps supported by the 51st Sapper Battalion. The fighting in the Malgobek area was relatively desultory until the 176th was committed on December 13. The division's Combat Report No. 02 issued at 1800 hours on December 15 stated in part:

... after an artillery preparation, 176th RD attacked toward Lake Am, 1.5km west of Razvil'noe, with two regiments at 1200 hours on 16 December... 404th RR, with 1st and 3rd Battalions... attacked... from jumping-off positions 2km west of Hill 427.8, and reached positions at Lake Am by 1800 hours... 591st RR, with 2nd Battalion... attacked toward Razvil'noe... from jumping-off positions 1.5km northwest of Iandiev and reached positions 500 metres north of Razvil'noe at 1800 hours... 109th RR, less its 1st Rifle Battalion, is continuing to defend positions from (incl.) Sagopshin to Psedakh, Kesken, and Hill 427.8... The enemy, while offering stubborn resistance, withdrew north of Lake Am and Zeml... Losses and trophies are being verified. 4 prisoners and 4 37mm guns were seized.

As this report indicates the 109th Rifle Regiment had by now replaced the 389th Rifle Regiment in the division's order of battle; this regiment had been awarded the Order of the Red Banner on March 27, 1942.

The December 13 attack, aided on the left by the 317th Rifle Division, gained from 4–6 km northward and began what would become a two-day fight for Hill 501.0, but proved to be the Army's only success during this mid-December drive. The offensive was renewed on December 17 but this only prevented the 50th Infantry from regaining its lost positions. 58th Army attacked again, as many as six times, with the 89th, 176th and 317th Divisions on December 21 and 22, only to be repulsed each time. Further attacks took place on December 24, 28 and 29 in what a German account described as "increasingly desperate fighting" but also failed to make any progress. The division was relieved overnight on January 1/2, 1943 by the 155th Rifle Brigade and began moving toward Nazran Station, 26 km north of Ordzhonikidze.

As the new year opened the division, along with the 10th Guards Corps and the 337th Rifle Division, was loading for transport to the 47th Army of the Black Sea Group of Forces, still in Transcaucasian Front, where it remained at the beginning of February. In a plan called Operation More (Sea) that was approved by the STAVKA on January 8 the 47th Army, with four rifle divisions and five brigades, supported by armor and artillery, was to penetrate Romanian defenses in the Abinskaya region and capture Krymskaya, then capture the port and city of Novorossiysk and subsequently clear the Taman Peninsula of all Axis forces. The 176th was to join in the second stage and reinforce the 103rd and 8th Guards Rifle Brigades to develop the offensive in the direction of Verkhne-Bakanskii. An amphibious group of two reinforced naval rifle brigades would land in the vicinity of Yuzhnaya Ozereyka west of Novorossiysk and take the city with an attack to the northeast. The 176th and 337th were expected to concentrate in the Gelendzhik region by the end of January 12. In the event, due to winter storms this was not accomplished until January 20. On this date the division was recorded as having a personnel strength of 6,069, which was 64 percent of establishment.

As German 17th Army was forced back toward the Taman Peninsula the 176th was again transferred, now to the 18th Army, still in the Black Sea Group of Forces which was now part of North Caucasus Front. The 591st Rifle Regiment was decorated with the Order of the Red Banner on February 8.

=== Battle of Novorossiysk ===
By the beginning of April most of 18th Army, including the 176th, had occupied the bridgehead called Malaya Zemlya which had been created on February 4 south of Novorossiysk. The Army, under command of Lt. Gen. K. N. Leselidze, had more than 20,000 men in the bridgehead with artillery and tank support. It was facing the German/Romanian V Army Corps which was planning a new offensive to eliminate the bridgehead which at this time was roughly 6 km wide and 4.5 km deep and thoroughly entrenched. In mid-April the division was holding the center section of the bridgehead front with the 51st Rifle Brigade to its south.

Operation Neptun began on April 17. V Corps had 28,000 troops on hand including the 4th Mountain and 125th Infantry Divisions and parts of three Romanian divisions backed by a detachment of StuG III assault guns and three battalions of heavy artillery. The assault was also to be backed with considerable air support and the Kriegsmarine was tasked with interdicting Soviet naval supply lines to the bridgehead. The main effort would be made by 4th Mountain against Mount Myskhako which was the southern bastion of the bridgehead. The Romanian units were assigned only supporting roles. The operation was delayed several times due to adverse weather which would have affected air operations and artillery observation but finally went ahead in order to get ahead of inevitable further Soviet attacks against the larger Kuban bridgehead.

Neptun was delayed to 0630 hours but was still hindered by 60 percent cloud cover and ground fog. Five battalions of the 4th Mountain Division assaulted the 2nd Battalion of the 107th Rifle Brigade just west of Mount Myskhako but made no progress due to the lack of effective air support and suffered 898 casualties. Before the commander of V Corps was fully aware of this failure he ordered the 125th Infantry to begin its part of the offensive at 0730. The assault guns that were to act in support did not arrive in time. The attack took place near the boundary of the 176th and the 51st Brigade over terrain that was hilly and heavily wooded, and although it continued for the rest of the day the fierce resistance of the two Red Army units limited its advance to no more than 700m. The interdiction of Soviet resupply and reinforcements was also a failure. On April 20 the offensive was renewed with a further effort to split the bridgehead between the 176th and 51st Brigade. This time V Corps had two assault gun batteries, two battalions of Nebelwerfer rocket launchers and considerable air support. The attack gained another 1,000m but the flanks held firm and General Leselidze committed his reserve 8th Guards and 83rd Naval Rifle brigades to stop the advance. The Red Air Force had also been reinforced with six regiments of Yak-9 fighters. The German offensive continued for another week but made no further gains. This failure made 17th Army's coastal flank a constant source of concern until the Kuban was finally evacuated.

The 176th remained in Malaya Zemlya as a separate rifle division of 18th Army into September. On September 3 Hitler finally agreed with his advisers to evacuate the Kuban bridgehead; this was unknown to North Caucasus Front which was making plans to finally liberate Novorossiysk. The combined land and amphibious assault began overnight on September 10/11 and fighting for the city continued for several days until it was abandoned by V Corps overnight on September 15/16 and units of 18th Army entered unopposed during the morning. 17th Army completed its evacuation of the Kuban on October 9. On the same day the division was officially redesignated as the 129th Guards Rifle Division.

== 2nd Formation ==
A new 176th Rifle Division was formed on February 12, 1944 in the 32nd Army of Karelian Front based on the 65th and 80th Naval Rifle Brigades and according to the rifle division shtat of December 10, 1942.

=== 65th Naval Rifle Brigade ===
This brigade had been formed in October 1941 in the Ural Military District and was assigned to Karelian Front in December. It was based on a cadre from the Pacific Fleet and joined the Maselskoi Operations Group on January 5, 1942. In April this became part of 32nd Army and the brigade remained on the relatively inactive front between Belomorsk and Lake Onega until it was disbanded to help form the new 176th.

=== 80th Naval Rifle Brigade ===
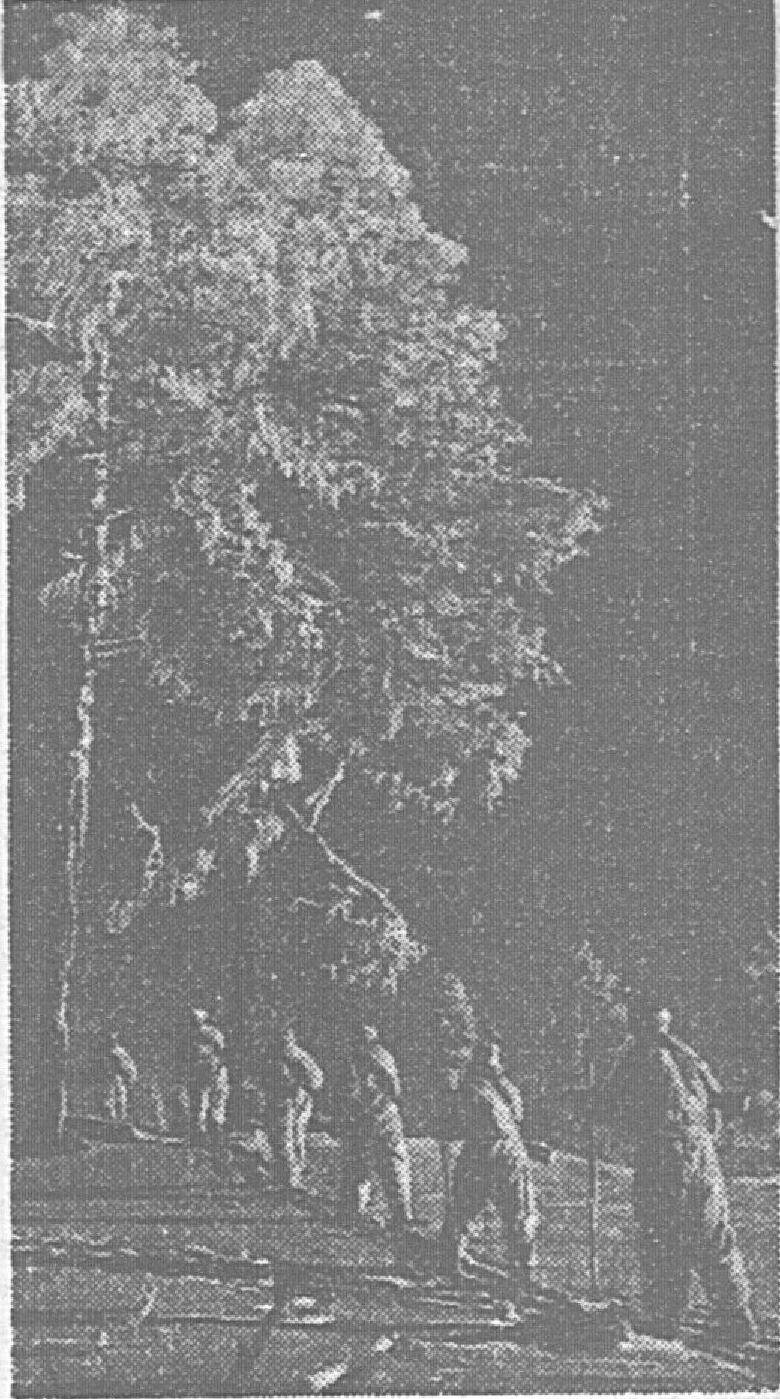
A ski patrol from Junior Lieutenant Ivan Nikolayevich Kot's platoon of the 65th Rifle Regiment departs on a mission, March 1944

Although its origins were somewhat different the 80th Naval Brigade shared a very similar combat path with the 65th. It had been formed in October 1941 at Kotelnikovo in the North Caucasus Military District and was moved to the Reserve of the Supreme High Command in December for deployment. Its personnel came from the Black Sea Fleet, the Caspian Flotilla and several naval schools. In January 1942 it was assigned to the Kemskaya Operational Group which was redesignated as the 26th Army of Karelian Front in April. It remained in this Army until February 1943 when it was shifted south to join 32nd Army and it remained under this command until it was used to help form the 176th.

The reformed division's regiments and other subunits were mostly given numbers from among those disbanded early in the war and not yet reformed:

- 52nd Rifle Regiment
- 55th Rifle Regiment
- 63rd Rifle Regiment
- 728th Artillery Regiment
- 33rd Antitank Battalion
- 64th Reconnaissance Company
- 243rd Sapper Battalion
- 197th Signal Battalion (later 1405th Signal Company)
- 128th Medical/Sanitation Battalion
- 80th Chemical Defense (Anti-gas) Company
- 368th Motor Transport Company
- 105th Field Bakery
- 331st Divisional Veterinary Hospital
- 738th Field Postal Station
- 1668th Field Office of the State Bank

Col. Aleksei Grigorevich Kaverin was given command of the division on the day it was formed, but this was relatively short-lived as Col. Vasilii Ivanovich Zolotarev took over on April 19; this officer would be promoted to the rank of major general on April 20, 1945 and remained in command for the duration of the war. As of the beginning of March the Army had just two other rifle divisions (289th, 313th) and two brigades under command so the 176th remained under direct Army control for the following months.

=== Battle of Ilomantsi ===
On June 10 the forces of Leningrad Front and Karelian Front began the offensive that would eventually drive Finland out of the Axis and out of the war, but this did not immediately involve 32nd Army. After suffering serious defeats the Finnish Army began to regain its equilibrium in the last two weeks of July. 32nd Army began an advance on July 26 in the direction of Ilomantsi, in North Karelia, using the 176th and 289th Rifle Divisions with limited armor and artillery support, despite the fact this was not headed toward any strategic objective. By this time the STAVKA had apparently decided that achieving a decisive victory against Finland would take more troops and resources than it was willing to spare from the upcoming offensives into Germany. The attack appeared initially to be a success as the two divisions reached the 1940 frontier and pushed on to the area where the 155th Rifle Division had been stalled in 1939. Finnish reinforcements arrived on July 28 and began counterattacking three days later. Already by August 1 they had cut the only road to the 176th in a return to the motti tactics of the Winter War. Three rifle brigades with armor support were organized to break through to the encircled divisions; while this was not successful it distracted the Finnish forces sufficiently for a large percentage of the pocketed men to break out and escape through the dense forests, losing their heavy equipment and vehicles in the process. The last men escaped on August 10; Finland and the USSR reached an armistice on September 4. Colonel Zolotarev was not blamed for this debacle and retained his command.

== Into Germany and Czechoslovakia ==
As of the beginning of October the three rifle divisions of the 32nd Army had been grouped together as the 135th Rifle Corps and the 176th remained under these commands until the middle of November when Karelian Front was disbanded and the division was removed to the Reserve of the Supreme High Command where it joined the 134th Rifle Corps, still in 32nd Army. When the new year began it had been assigned as a separate rifle division in the 31st Army of 3rd Belorussian Front which was preparing to invade East Prussia later in January; by that time it had been assigned to the 36th Rifle Corps, which also contained the 173rd and 352nd Rifle Divisions. It would remain under this Corps command for the duration of the war.

During the advance on Königsberg the 176th, with its Corps, was assigned to the 5th Army, before returning to 31st Army by the end of March. On April 5 the division was awarded the honorific "Masurian" for its part in the battles for the Masurian Lake District. It was further distinguished on April 26 with the award of the Order of Suvorov, 2nd degree, as a result of its fighting southwest of Königsberg.

Later in April, the entire 31st Army was shifted out of 3rd Belorussian Front and moved south. In the last three weeks of the war the 176th Division and its Army were under the command of 1st Ukrainian Front, advancing into Czechoslovakia.

== Postwar ==
The division held the full title of 176th Rifle, Masurian, Order of Suvorov Division [Russian: 176-я стрелковая Мазурская ордена Суворова дивизия] when the fighting came to an end. According to STAVKA Order No. 11096 of May 29, 1945, part 8, the 176th is listed as one of the rifle divisions to be "disbanded in place", which took place in July 1945.
