= Battle of Ilomantsi (1944) =

Battle of the Continuation War in Finland

Coordinates: 62.718°N 31.526°E

- Part of the Continuation War of World War II
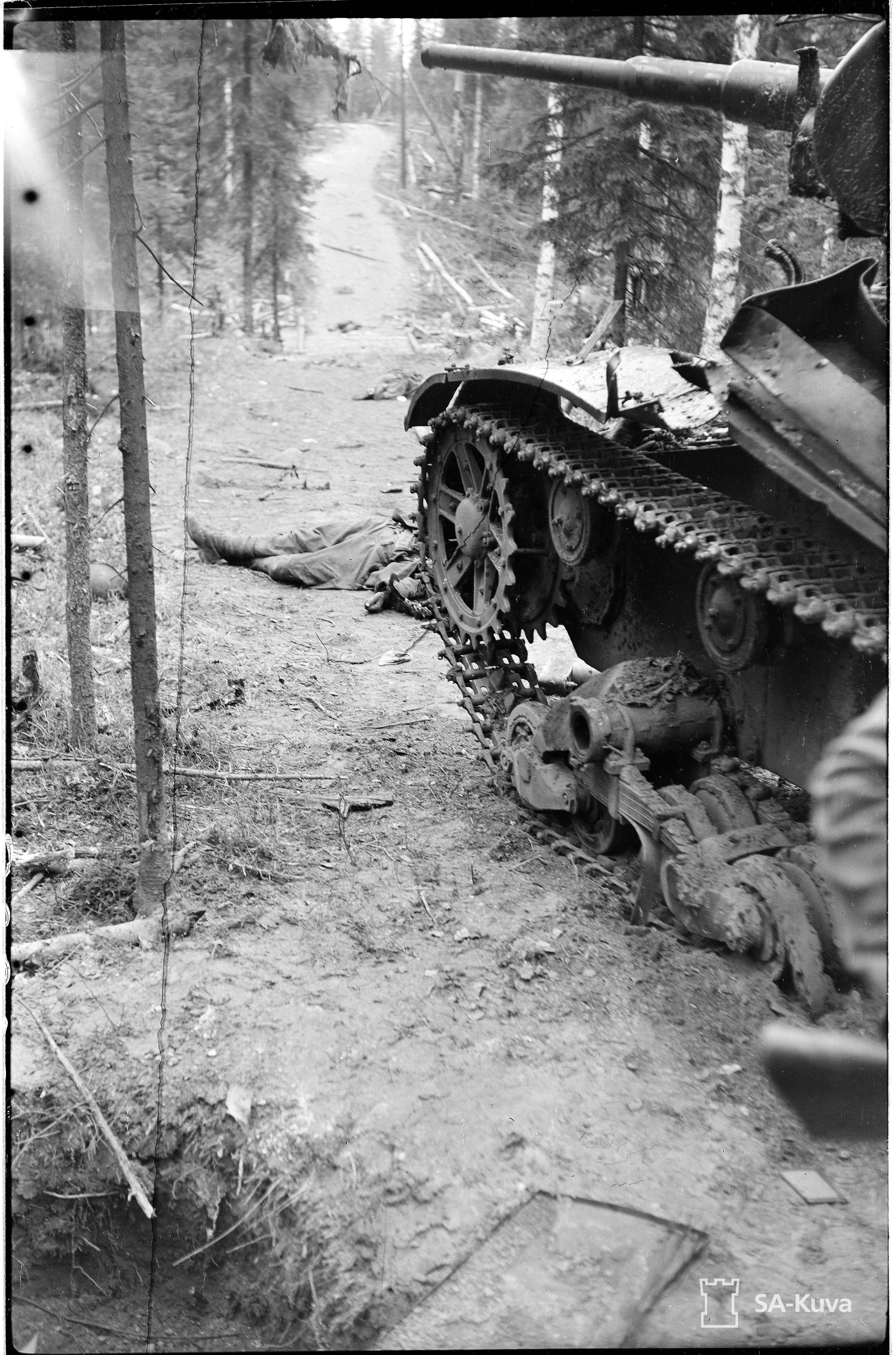
- Destroyed Soviet T-26 tank.
Date	26 July 1944 – 13 August 1944
Location	North Karelia, Finland
Result	Finnish victory

Belligerents
Finland	Soviet Union

Commanders and leaders
Erkki Raappana	Filipp Gorelenko

Strength
Initially 7,000 later 14,500	Initially 16,000 later 20,000+

Casualties and losses
400 killed or missing 1,300 wounded Between 24 July – 13 August: 2,500 in total Between 24 July – 13 August: 542 battle deaths Database of deceased soldiers (KIA, DOW, MIA confirmed later dead) of all troops involved Jaeger Battalion 1 and 6, Häme Cavalry Regiment, Uudenmaa Dragoon Regiment, 21st Brigade, 3rd Frontier Jaeger Battalion, I/52nd Regiment, II/33rd Regiment, Detached Battalion 24 + their support troops of artillery and engineer units	3,200 killed 3,450 wounded 1,400 missing These figures include Soviet losses during the last week of July Between 1–11 August: 1,500 KIA & MIA; 3,500 WIA; Not including Soviet losses during last week of July Between 26 July – 13 August 13,050 in total

The Battle of Ilomantsi (Finnish: Ilomantsin taistelu) was a part of the Svir–Petrozavodsk Offensive of the Continuation War (1941–1944). It was fought from 26 July to 13 August 1944, between Finland and the Soviet Union in an area roughly 40 kilometers wide and 30 kilometers deep, near the Finnish-Soviet border, close to the Finnish village of Ilomantsi, in North Karelia. The battle ended with a Finnish victory—the last major Soviet attack against Finland was stopped here.

== Order of battle ==
=== Finnish ===
Finnish forces in the area before the battle consisted of only the 21st Brigade under Colonel Ekman but they were reinforced by the Cavalry Brigade and three other battalions—3rd Border Jaeger Battalion and the two-battalion strong detachment P (Os. P). All Finnish forces were subordinated to a temporary formation named Group R—Group Raappana ("Ryhmä Raappana" in Finnish)—after its commanding officer, the famed Finnish Major General Erkki Raappana, a Knight of the Mannerheim Cross, tasked with defeating the advancing Soviet units and recapturing the crossroads at Kuolismaa village.

During the initial Soviet push the sole unit defending against and delaying it was the Finnish 21st Brigade (roughly 7,000 men). As the front in the Karelian Isthmus was stabilized the Cavalry Brigade was rushed to Ilomantsi to reinforce the 21st Brigade, bringing the Finnish strength on 31 July, when the counterattack began, to roughly 13,000.

=== Soviet ===
General Meretskov's Karelian Front's forces advancing towards Ilomantsi consisted of two divisions of the Soviet 32nd Army under Lieutenant General Filip D. Gorelenko–the 176th (Colonel V. I. Zolotarev) and 289th (Major General Chernukha) Rifle Divisions. Later as the battle progressed and the advancing divisions were encircled, Soviet forces in the area were reinforced by the 3rd, 69th and 70th Naval Infantry Brigades and other formations.

According to Soviet archives, at the beginning of the Karelian Front's offensive on 21 June 1944 the two Soviet divisions had a combined strength of roughly 16,000 men. By the time (31 July) the Finnish counterattack at Ilomantsi started, their strength had dropped to 11,000 men. After the 3rd Naval Infantry (ru. Morskaya Pekhota) Brigade and the 69th and 70th Naval Rifle (ru. Morskaya Strelkovy) Brigades were brought to support the encircled 176th and 289th Rifle Divisions, the combined Soviet infantry strength in Ilomantsi was slightly higher than 20,000 men.

== Battle ==
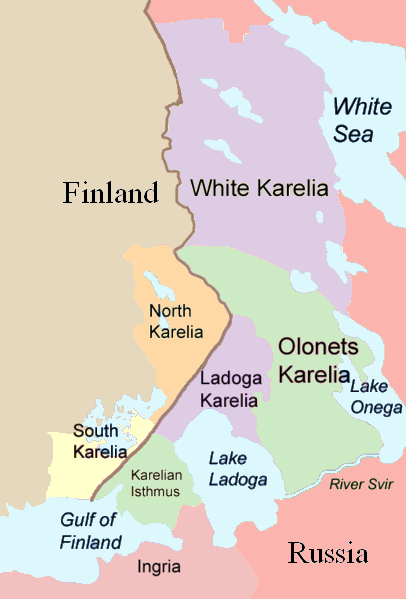
Parts of Karelia, as they are traditionally divided.

At first, the Soviet offensive seemed to be successful as on 21 July 1944, the Red Army units were able to reach the Finnish-Soviet border of 1940 for the only time during the entire Soviet offensive of 1944 and, in fact, ever since 1941. Finnish reinforcements arrived on 28 July, and on 31 July Raappana started the counterattack. Already by 1 August the Finns had cut the sole road leading to the 176th Rifle Division and by 3 August both Soviet divisions were encircled as the Finnish forces utilized envelopment tactics ("motti" in Finnish) that drew upon ancient methods of warfare and those already used by them in the Winter War (1939–1940). Soldiers of the Erillinen Pataljoona 4 (Separate battalion 4) disrupted the supply lines of the Soviet artillery, preventing effective fire support.

The Soviets deployed three brigades with armor support to open the road connections to the encircled divisions but Finnish efforts prevented them. Renewed attacks distracted the Finns enough to allow the encircled Soviet forces to escape through the dense forests by abandoning their heavy equipment. Given the element of surprise and due to the superior numbers of the Soviets, the Finnish troops guarding the encircled divisions had little hope of containing organized breakouts, especially in the forests, and so many of the encircled Soviets managed to escape to their own side with the last escaping on 10 August.

The Utrio area played a central role in General Raappana's plan of defence. Fast-moving battalions from the Cavalry Brigade, experienced in forest warfare, drove through this area between lakes, as a wedge between the attacking Soviet 176th and 289th Rifle Divisions. The opening battles fell on the Finnish Jaeger Battalion 6. When it implemented the encirclements at Leminaho and the Lutikkavaara hill, the Uusimaa Dragoon Regiment attacked through Utrio and the River Ruukinpohja, with flanking from the Jaeger Battalion 1.

== Outcome ==
Two attacking Red Army divisions were decimated in this last major engagement on the Finnish front, before the armistice was concluded in early September 1944.

Military historians note that the two Red Army divisions were completely routed after a week and a half of fighting, leaving behind over 3,200 Red Army soldiers dead, thousands wounded and missing, and over 100 pieces of heavy artillery, approximately 100 mortars and the rest of the Soviet ordnance for the Finns to capture.

This was the ninth major Finnish defense victory in a period of only a few weeks following the main Soviet offense against the Finnish forces launched in June 1944. Moscow now could only conclude that the Finns had plenty of fight left in them.

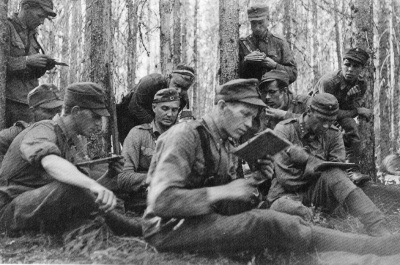
Osasto Partinen (Detachment Partinen) in the forests of Ilomantsi.

General Raappana's men had fired within ten days over 36,000 artillery shells, aimed at the Soviet forces. The Soviet artillery participating in Ilomantsi were able to fire only 10,000 shells during the same period. The main reason for the poorer Soviet artillery outcome was the Finnish disturbance tactics. For instance, a Finnish guerrilla detachment led by the Knight of the Mannerheim Cross, Lieutenant Heikki Nykänen, destroyed a Soviet convoy of 30 trucks carrying artillery rounds to the battle scene.

== Impact ==
The Finns had achieved victory, and the remnants of the two Red Army divisions had barely escaped destruction by breaking out from the encirclements.

The Finnish President Mauno Koivisto spoke at a seminar held in August 1994, in the North Karelian city of Joensuu, to celebrate the 50th anniversary of the Finnish victory in the crucial battle. The future President of Finland had witnessed this battle as a soldier in a reconnaissance company commanded by Captain Lauri Törni, a Finnish war hero and Knight of the Mannerheim Cross who later served in the USA as a Green Beret under the name Larry Thorne:

In the summer of 1944, when the Red Army launched an all-out offensive, aimed at eliminating Finland, the Finns were "extremely hard-pressed", President Koivisto declared, but they "did not capitulate".

"We succeeded in stopping the enemy cold at key points," the President said, "and in the final battle at Ilomantsi even in pushing him back."

In a speech on 4 September 1994, on the occasion of the 50th anniversary of the signing of the armistice ending the Finnish-Soviet hostilities, the Prime Minister of Finland Esko Aho declared:

"I do not see a defeat in the summer's battles, but the victory of a small nation over a major power, whose forces were stopped far short of the objectives of the Soviet leadership. Finland was not beaten militarily..."

"Finland preserved her autonomy and her democratic social system..."

"Finland...won the peace."

== Sources ==
- Leskinen, Jari; Juutilainen, Antti, eds. (2005). Jatkosodan pikkujättiläinen (in Finnish). Porvoo: Werner Söderström OY. ISBN 951-0-28690-7.
- Nordberg, Erkki (2003). Arvio ja ennuste Venäjän sotilaspolitiikasta Suomen suunnalla [Estimate and prediction of Russian military policy in Finnish direction] (in Finnish). Helsinki: Art House. ISBN 951-884-362-7.
- Rausio, Ari; Kilin, Juri (2009). Jatkosodan torjuntataisteluja 1942–44 [Defensive Battles of Continuation War 1942–44] (in Finnish). Helsinki: Karttakeskus. ISBN 978-951-593-070-5.
- Rysti, Tuomo (director, writer) (4 June 2003). Korpisodan suurvoitto [Major victory in war in the wilderness] (in Finnish). Finland: Yleisradio (YLE).
- "Ilomantsi sodassa". 3 August 2009.
