= 367th Rifle Division =

367th Rifle Division (1941–1955); 65th Rifle Division (1955–1957); 111th Motor Rifle Division (1957–c. 1997)
- Active: 1941–1997
- Country: Soviet Union
- Branch: Red Army (Soviet Army from 1946)
- Type: Division
- Role: Infantry, Motorized Infantry
- Engagements: Continuation War; Lapland War; Petsamo–Kirkenes Offensive
- Decorations: Order of the Red Banner

Commanders
- Notable commanders: Col. Ivan Mikhailovich Puzikov; Maj. Gen. Nikolai Antonovich Chernukha; Maj. Gen. Yan Petrovich Sinkevich; Col. Aleksandr Alexeevich Startzev

The 367th Rifle Division was raised in 1941 as a standard Red Army rifle division, and served for the duration of the Great Patriotic War in that role. It began forming in August 1941 in the Chelyabinsk Oblast. After forming, it was initially assigned to the 28th (Reserve) Army, but was soon reassigned to Karelian Front, where it remained until nearly the end of 1944. The division had mostly a relatively quiet war on this defensive front, but later saw action against the German forces trying to hold northern Finland, being awarded the Order of the Red Banner for its services. The division ended the war in 14th Separate Army on garrison duties in the far north.

The division was stationed at Sortavala after the end of the war and renumbered as the 65th in 1955, then converted to the 111th Motor Rifle Division two years later. It served there with the 6th Army for the rest of the war, and was reduced to a storage base around 1997 before disbanding in 2007.

== Formation ==
The division began forming on August 29, 1941 in the Urals Military District in the Chelyabinsk Oblast. Its basic order of battle was as follows:

- 1217th Rifle Regiment
- 1219th Rifle Regiment
- 1221st Rifle Regiment
- 928th Artillery Regiment

Col. Ivan Mikhailovich Puzikov was assigned to command of the division on the day it began forming, and he would remain in command until February 24, 1942. In late November it was assigned briefly to the 28th Army in the Reserve of the Supreme High Command, but was then sent to the front in Karelia, where it was assigned to the Maselskaya Operational Group. In December the division was reported as being made up of men mostly 35 to 41 years old. Colonel Puzikov was replaced by Col. Nikolai Ivanovich Afonskii on February 25, who was in turn replaced by Lt. Col. Nikolai Ivanovich Shpilev on April 22. Meanwhile, the 32nd Army was reformed in March, in part from the Maselskaya Group, and the division was assigned to that Army in May. Col. Fedor Ivanovich Korobko took command on June 24, but less than a month later Colonel Puzikov returned to his previous position.

== Combat service ==
The 367th remained in 32nd Army until February 1944. During this entire period this Army was stationed in the Segezhsky District of the Karelo-Finnish SSR, facing the Finnish II Army Corps across the static front. Colonel Puzikov was replaced on November 1, 1942 by Col. Nikolai Antonovich Chernukha, who would be promoted to Major General on May 18, 1943, and would remain in command until June 12, 1944.

In February the division was moved north to join 26th Army in the Ukhta region. It was briefly assigned to 31st Rifle Corps before reverting to being a separate division within the Army. In these positions it faced elements of the German XVIII Mountain Corps over the next several months, while to the south Finland was being driven out of the war in the Vyborg–Petrozavodsk Offensive. Maj. Gen. Yan Petrovich Sinkevich took over the divisional command on June 13, but was in turn replaced by Col. Aleksandr Alexeevich Startzev on August 10; this officer would remain in command for the duration of the war.

At the beginning of September the 367th was assigned to 132nd Rifle Corps, still in 26th Army. On September 4/5 a Soviet-Finnish cease-fire went into effect, and on the 6th the German forces in Finland began Operation Birke, with the goal of a withdrawal into Norway, although the Germans were secretly determined to hold the Pechenga District for the sake of the nickel mines there. XVIII Mountain Corps withdrew by stages, and 26th Army followed up as far as the 1940 Soviet-Finnish border.

In October the division was reassigned to 31st Rifle Corps in the newly-expanded 14th Army, far up north in the Murmansk Oblast. The 367th would remain under these commands for the duration of the war. The Wehrmacht High Command (OKW) had reviewed the German position in Finland and, after being assured by Speer that Germany had sufficient stockpiles of nickel on hand, dropped the plan to hold Pechenga and instead evacuate to Norway in Operation Nordlicht. On October 7, 14th Army opened an offensive against the XIX Mountain Corps on the Litsa River; by the 10th the German forces were in a crisis, and by October 14 had completely lost a front they had held for three years. 14th Army then paused to regroup, resuming its offensive towards the Norwegian border on the 18th and continuing until the 28th when the pursuit began to slow. On November 14 the division was recognized for its part in the taking of the town of Nikel and the surrounding area with the award of the Order of the Red Banner. The 367th Rifle, Order of the Red Banner Division (Russian: 367-я стрелковая Краснознамённая дивизия) settled down as a garrison unit in the high Arctic until after the end of the war in Europe.

== Postwar ==
The division was transferred to Sortavala in the Belomorsky Military District as part of the 131st Rifle Corps by July 1945. It remained there for the rest of its existence, and in April 1955 was renumbered as the 65th Rifle Division. In 1957 it became the 111th Motor Rifle Division. It included the 109th Guards Artillery Regiment from the 64th Guards Rifle Division from the late 1940s and early 1950s, serving as part of the 6th Army from 1952. In 1968, its 184th Motor Rifle Regiment was used to form the mobilization 16th Motor Rifle Division and a new 184th was formed with the 111th. By the late 1980s, the division included the 185th Motor Rifle Regiment, 1031st Anti-Aircraft Artillery Regiment, 952nd Separate Missile Battalion, 645th Separate Engineer-Sapper Battalion, 816th Separate Communications Battalion, separate chemical defense company, separate medical battalion, and the 1487th Separate Material Support Battalion at Sortavala. The 182nd and 184th Motor Rifle Regiments, the 91st Separate Tank Battalion, 109th Guards Artillery Regiment, separate anti-tank battalion, 795th Separate Reconnaissance Battalion, 296th Equipment Maintenance and the Recovery Battalion were stationed at Lakhdenpokhya. The division was active until 1994, and then became the 20th Separate Motor Rifle Brigade, which became a Weapons and Equipment Storage Base between January 1997 and June 1998. As the 20th Independent Motor Rifle Brigade transferred to the 30th Guards Army Corps.
