= 313th Division =

313th Division may refer to:

- 313th Rifle Division, Soviet Union
- 313th Air Division, United States

== See also ==
- List of military divisions by number
