= 114th Rifle Division =

114th Rifle Division (July 4, 1939 - June 1946)
- Active: 1939–1946
- Country: Soviet Union
- Branch: Red Army
- Type: Infantry
- Size: Division
- Engagements: Continuation War; Vyborg–Petrozavodsk Offensive; Svir-Petrozavodsk Offensive; Petsamo–Kirkenes Offensive; Liberation of Finnmark
- Decorations: Order of the Red Banner
- Battle honours: Svir

Commanders
- Notable commanders: Col. Sergei Nikolaievich Devyatov; Maj. Gen. Mikhail Ignatovich Panfilovich; Col. Ignatii Alekseevich Moskalev; Col. Nikolai Antonovich Koshchienko

The 114th Rifle Division was formed as an infantry division of the Red Army in July 1939, in the Transbaikal Military District, based on the shtat (table of organization and equipment) of the following September. Shortly after the outbreak of war with Germany it was assigned to 36th Army, still in the Far East, but in September it was moved west by stages, joining the independent 7th Army on the Svir River front in October, facing the Finnish Army. It remained on this front and in this Army and had a relatively uneventful war facing the Finns, eventually as part of Karelian Front, until the Vyborg–Petrozavodsk offensive began on June 10, 1944, from which point it saw much more active service. Soon after this offensive began it forced one of the crossings over the Svir and won that name as a battle honor. As the Finns were leaving the war the division was transferred to the independent 14th Army in the Arctic, from where it helped to defeat and pursue the German forces from Lapland into Norway. For its role in the capture of Petsamo it was awarded the Order of the Red Banner in October, and the following month a reconnaissance detachment of the division made the deepest Soviet penetration into Norway. Through the remainder of the war it was "out of contact with the enemy", and after continuing to serve in the Far North into peacetime it was disbanded in June 1946.

== Formation ==
The division began forming on July 14, 1939, at Irkutsk in the Transbaikal Military District. On August 16 the division came under the command of Col. Sergei Nikolaievich Devyatov, who would remain in this post until November 3, 1941.

On June 22, 1941, the division was still in that district. Its order of battle was as follows:

- 363rd Rifle Regiment
- 536th Rifle Regiment
- 763rd Rifle Regiment
- 405th Light Artillery Regiment (later 405th Light Artillery Regiment)
- 480th Howitzer Regiment (until January 16, 1942)
- 206th Antitank Battalion
- 717th Mortar Battalion (from January 16, 1942 until June 5, 1942)
- 760th Mortar Battalion (from October 31, 1941 until October 20, 1942)
- 148th Reconnaissance Company
- 294th Sapper Battalion
- 274th Signal Battalion (later 755th Signal Company)
- 229th Medical/Sanitation Battalion
- 229th Chemical Defense (Anti-gas) Platoon
- 23rd Motor Transport Company (later 143rd Battalion)
- 55th Field Bakery (later 217th, 18th)
- 33rd Divisional Veterinary Hospital (until January 16, 1942)
- 136th Field Postal Station
- 19th Field Office of the State Bank

In July, the 114th joined the 36th Army in the same district, but in September was alerted for transfer to the west. It was eventually assigned to the Southern Operations Group of 7th Army in East Karelia, facing the Finnish Army along the front of the Svir River until June 1944. During most of this time it was part of the 4th Rifle Corps. Col. Mikhail Ignatovich Panfilovich took command of the division on November 4, 1941, and he would remain in command for most of the rest of the war, being promoted to the rank of major general on October 16, 1943.

== Advance ==
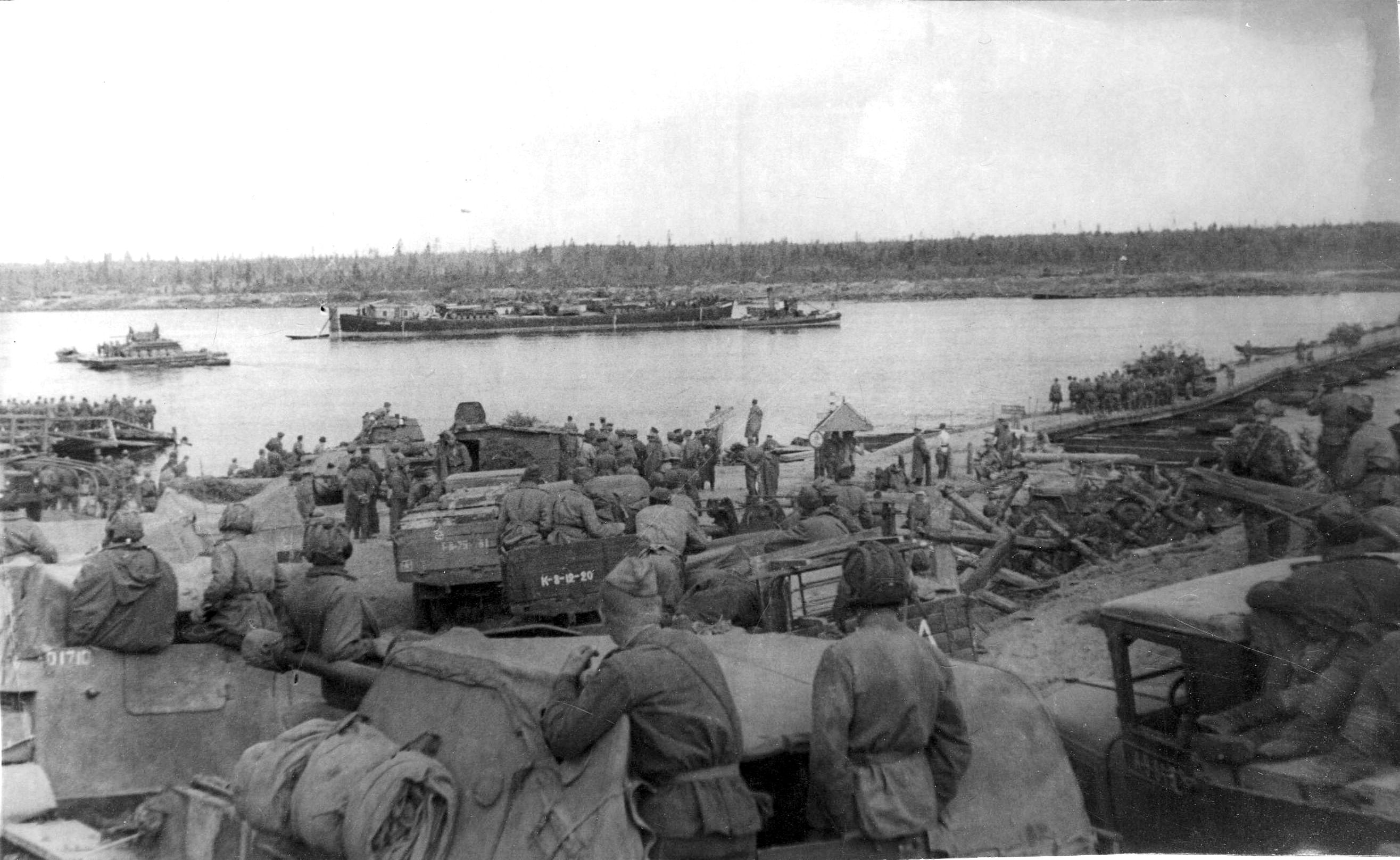
Forces of 7th Army crossing the Svir, June 23, 1944

On May 15, 1944, General Panfilovich handed his command to Col. Ignatii Alekseevich Moskalev. The Soviet offensive against Finland began on June 10. By June 16, Field Marshal C. G. E. Mannerheim had issued orders to give up East Karelia under the weight of the Soviet assault; the Finns gave up their bridgehead south of the Svir two days later. The withdrawal went less smoothly than they expected, because 7th Army kept up an aggressive pursuit, crossing the river on either side of Lodeynoye Pole. The 114th distinguished itself in this operation and on July 2 would be given the honorific «Свирская» (Svir). By June 30 the Finns had been forced out of Petrozavodsk and, two days later, Salmi. On July 26, Col. Nikolai Antonovich Koshchienko took command of the division, which he would lead for the duration of the war.

By August the Soviet forces had driven the Finnish army back to its 1940 borders, and beginning on August 9 the division was moved to the high Arctic, becoming part of 14th Army's 31st Rifle Corps. It took part in the Petsamo–Kirkenes Offensive along the coast of the Arctic Ocean, driving the German 20th Mountain Army out of northern Finland and into Norway. On October 31, the 114th was recognized for its role in the capture of Petsamo with the award of the Order of the Red Banner.

=== Into Norway ===
14th Army continued its attack into Norway past Kirkenes and across the Neiden River. By now, in late October, the Army faced very difficult terrain and the Arctic night, and operations were brought to a virtual halt. However, a reconnaissance force of the 114th was sent 116 road kilometres further west into Norway, eventually reaching Tana on November 13, the deepest operation by Soviet forces into that country. The division served the remainder of the war in Arctic, in 14th Army, officially "out of contact with the enemy" after December. At the war's end the soldiers of the 114th held the full title of 114th Rifle, Svir, Order of the Red Banner Division. (Russian: 114-я стрелковая Свирская Краснознамённая дивизия).

== Postwar ==
After the peace the division became part of the 131st Rifle Corps at Repola. It disbanded there in June 1946.
