= 4th Rifle Corps =

- Active: I Formation: 1922–1941 II Formation: 1942–1946
- Country: Soviet Union
- Branch: Red Army
- Type: Infantry
- Engagements: World War II: Soviet invasion of Poland; Battle of Białystok–Minsk; Vyborg-Petrozavodsk Offensive
- Battle honours: Svir (2nd formation)

Commanders
- Notable commanders: Jānis Fabriciuss Aleksandr Loktionov Nikandr Chibisov

The 4th Rifle Corps was a corps of the Red Army, active from the 1920s.

== First Formation ==
It was formed during the Russian Civil War as part of the Western Front of the Red Army in May and June 1922. The corps headquarters was stationed in Vitebsk from June 1922 to August 1938. In April 1924, the corps became part of the Western Military District, later known as the Belorussian, Belorussian Special, and Western Special Military Districts. In July 1938 the Vitebsk army group was established from the corps. The new corps was instructed to be created by 1 October of the same year. In September 1938 its headquarters was transferred to Polotsk. In September 1939, the Corps troops took part in the Soviet invasion of Poland as part of the 3rd Army, Belorussian Front. After fighting in the Soviet invasion of Poland, corps headquarters was at Berezino. In October 1939 it was moved to Vilnius and then Postavy, where it was until April 1940. In April it moved back to Polotsk and in June 1940 was at Daugavpils. In July it moved to Grodno.

On 22 June 1941, the 27th, 56th, and 85th Rifle Divisions were part of the corps, as part of 3rd Army.

== Second Formation ==
The second formation of the corps was established on 4 April 1942, and placed under Major General Panteleymon Aleksandrovich Zaytsev (who commanded 4.4.42 – 27.11.43). The 114th Rifle Division was added to the corps in June 1942. It served with the 7th Army from its formation until November 1944, when it was resubordinated to the Belomorsky Military District in the north. On 1 July 1945 the second formation of the corps was part of the Belomorsky Military District, with 25th, 289th, and 341st Rifle Divisions.

The corps was disbanded on 10 July 1946.

== Commanders ==
- Alexander Pavlov : 1922-1924
- Konstantin Neumann : June 1924 — February 1927
- Jan Fabriciuss : 1927 — 1928
- Ivan Kuyakov : May 1928 — November 1930
- Aleksandr Loktionov : November 1930 — December 1933
- Danilo Srdić : 1933 — April 1935
- Andrei Sazontov : September 1935 — May 1937
- Trifon Shevaldin : July 1937 — March 1938
- Nikandr Chibisov : March — May 1938
- Ivan Davidovsky : 02/20/1939 brigade commander, from 11/04/1939 division commander - (March 1938 - 02/15/1940)
- Nikolai Nikishin : May 1938 - July 1938
- Yury Novoselsky : (July 1938 - August 1938), brigade commander
- Evgeny Egorov :(from 02/15/1940 to 09/01/1941), division commander, from 06/05/1940 - major general, was captured on 06/29/1941
