= Filipp Gorelenko =

Philip Danilovich Gorelenko
- Филипп Данилович Гореленко
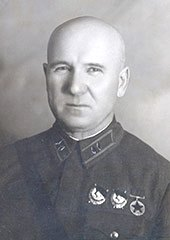
- Born: 26 November 1888; Cherkasy Raion, Don Host Oblast, Russian Empire
- Died: 25 January 1956 (aged 67); Leningrad, Leningrad Oblast, Soviet Union
- Military career
- Allegiance: Russia; Soviet Union
- Branch: Red Army / Soviet Army
- Service years: Russia 1909–1917; 1917–1951

Filipp Danilovich Gorelenko (Russian: Филипп Данилович Гореленко, Cherkasy Raion, 25 November 1888 – Leningrad, 25 January 1956) was a Soviet Army lieutenant general and a Hero of the Soviet Union.

== Biography ==
Gorelenko participated in the First World War and the Russian Civil War.

From June 1937 until August 1939, he was the commander of the 14th Rifle Division. From August 1939 to July 1940, he led the 50th Rifle Corps during the Winter War with Finland. In February 1940, parts of his Corps broke through the Mannerheim Line together with the 34th Rifle Corps. For skilful leadership of the corps and personal courage, on 21 March 1940, Gorelenko was awarded the title of Hero of the Soviet Union. He was the only corps commander to be awarded this title at the end of the war.

From July 1940, he was appointed as a deputy commander of the Leningrad Military District. On 28 January 1941, F. D. Gorelenko became the commander of the 7th Army. At the start of the Continuation War in June 1941, he fought with his 7th Army against the Finnish and German Army in Karelia. On 24 September 1941, he was removed from his post and appointed as a deputy commander of the same army, but on 9 November 1941, he was re-instated as commander of the 7th Army. On 16 May 1942, he became the commander of the 32nd Army and held this position until the end of the war with Finland. He participated in the Svir–Petrozavodsk Offensive and Battle of Ilomantsi (1944).

After the war, from December 1945, Gorelenko worked as a deputy commander of the White Sea Military District. Since November 1949, he became the Chairman of the DOSAAF in the Karelo Finnish SSR. He was also elected as a Deputy of the Supreme Council of the Karelo-Finnish SSR.

In 1951, he retired.

== Sources ==
- Generals.dk
