= 313th Rifle Division =

313th Rifle Division (July 15, 1941 – May 29, 1945)
- Active: 1941–1945
- Country: Soviet Union
- Branch: Red Army
- Type: Infantry
- Size: Division
- Engagements: Siege of Leningrad; Continuation War; Svir–Petrozavodsk Offensive; Vistula-Oder Offensive; East Pomeranian Offensive; Berlin Strategic Offensive
- Decorations: Order of the Red Banner Twice Order of Suvorov Order of Kutuzov
- Battle honours: Petrozavodsk

Commanders
- Notable commanders: Maj. Gen. Anton Aleksandrovich Pavlovich; Col. Grigorii Vasilevich Golovanov; Col. Nikifor Fomich Tsygankov

The 313th Rifle Division was a standard Red Army rifle division formed on July 15, 1941 in the Udmurt ASSR before being sent to the vicinity of Leningrad, first in the 7th Separate Army east of Lake Ladoga, and later in 32nd Army of Karelian Front, where it spent most of the war facing the Finnish Army in East Karelia. In consequence the division saw relatively uneventful service on this mostly quiet front until the summer of 1944, when it took part in the offensive that drove Finland out of the war. When this was accomplished, the division was redeployed to take the fight into Poland and then into the German heartland in the winter and spring of 1945. It ended the war north of Berlin after compiling a very distinguished record of service.

== Formation ==
The 313th began forming on July 15, 1941 in the Udmurt ASSR in the Urals Military District. Its basic order of battle was as follows:

- 1068th Rifle Regiment
- 1070th Rifle Regiment
- 1072nd Rifle Regiment
- 856th Artillery Regiment

Maj. Gen. Anton Aleksandrovich Pavlovich was given command of the division on the day it began forming. In August, while still forming up, the division was assigned to the Reserve of the Supreme High Command and between September 5–9 it arrived in the Petrozavodsk area near Lake Onega and was assigned to the 7th Army. In October it moved north and became part of the Karelian Front, in the Medvezhegorskaya Operational Group, which became the 2nd Formation of the 32nd Army in March 1942. In mid-October, General Pavlovich handed command to Col. Aleksandr Pavlovich Petrov, but he in turn was replaced by Col. Grigorii Vasilevich Golovanov a month later; Golovanov remained in command until the end of February 1944. The 313th also remained on this static front, facing the Finns just south of the Arctic Circle, until the summer of 1944. On July 19, 1943, it was awarded the Order of the Red Banner for "exemplary fulfillment of command tasks" and its "valor and courage".

== Svir–Petrozavodsk Offensive ==
Leningrad Front began its offensive on the Isthmus of Karelia on June 10, making rapid progress towards Vyborg despite strong Finnish resistance. On June 16 the Finnish commander-in-chief, Marshal Mannerheim, issued orders to give up East Karelia, to free up forces for the main front on the Isthmus, so when Karelian Front launched its own offensive on the 20th it faced a very fluid situation. The 313th was tasked with clearing the railway southwards along the western shores of Lake Onega to link up with 7th Army. It did so on June 29 at Petrozavodsk, and was distinguished with the name of the town where it had arrived at the front, and finally liberated nearly three years later, as an honorific:

"PETROZAVODSK"...313 Rifle Division (Colonel Tsygankov, Nikifor Fomich)... the troops who participated in the battles with the enemy, and the liberation of Petrozavodsk, by the order of the Supreme High Command of 29 June 1944, and a commendation in Moscow, are given a salute of 24 artillery salvos from 324 guns.

Following this, the division helped continue to push the Finnish forces back to the so-called U-Line, along the Uksu River - Lake Loimola - Lake Tolva, north of Lake Ladoga, which was reached by July 10.

== Advance ==
In November, when this operation was ended, the 313th was transferred to the 19th Army in the Reserve of the Supreme High Command. It returned to the fighting front in January 1945, in the 132nd Rifle Corps of that Army, in the 2nd Belorussian Front, and fought under those headquarters until the end of the war. At the start of the second phase of the Vistula-Oder Offensive on February 24, 19th Army attached the division to the 3rd Guards Tank Corps as an exploitation force to drive through to the Baltic coast north of Koslin to cut the path to the west of the German forces in eastern Pomerania. By the 27th the tanks had made great progress, advancing as much as 60 km, forcing units of German 2nd Army to fall back without much resistance, but the rifle divisions were falling behind; the 313th reached Gross Karzenburg on this date, some 45 km farther back. As well, 19th Army headquarters was losing communications with its troops, and the Front had to order a delay of the further offensive by the tank corps while the Army reorganized.

On March 5 the division received its last commander, Col. Vasilii Andryanovich Asafev, replacing Colonel Tsygankov. On April 5 it was awarded its second Order of the Red Banner for its role in the capture of the Pomeranian towns of Człuchów, Czarne, Biały Bór and others.

In April, the 313th participated in the Berlin Strategic Offensive Operation, and ended the war north of Berlin. When hostilities ceased, the division carried the official title of 313th Rifle, Petrozavodsk, twice Order of the Red Banner, Order of Suvorov, Order of Kutuzov Division. (Russian: 313-я стрелковая Петрозаводская дважды Краснознамённая орденов Суворова и Кутузова дивизия.)

== Postwar ==
The division was disbanded "in place" during the summer of 1945 with the Northern Group of Forces.
