= Soviet order of battle for invasion of Poland in 1939 =

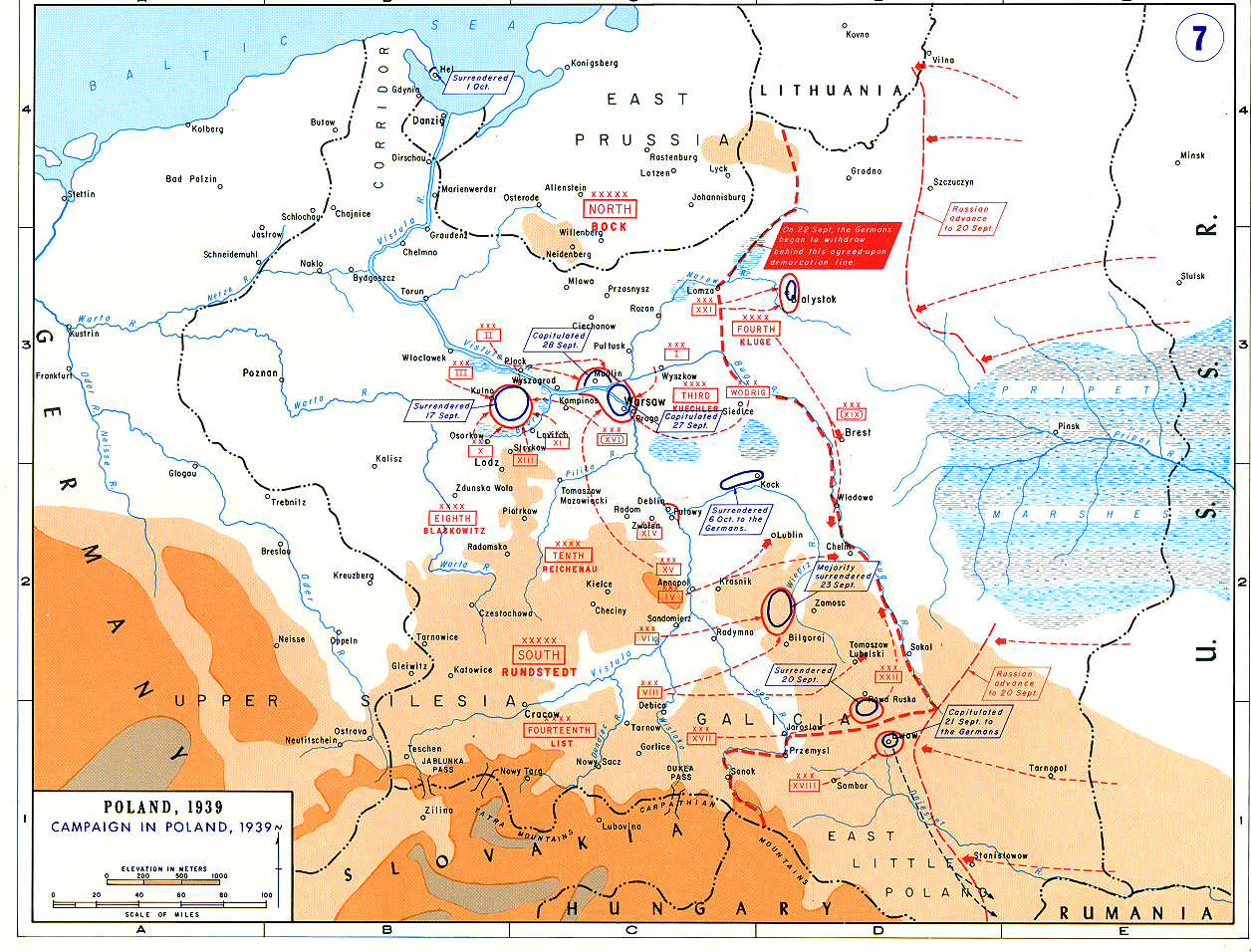
Map of central Poland with the Siege of Warsaw (upper middle). Situation after September 14, 1939 - the map also gives information on placement and movement of some Soviet troops

The Soviet order of battle for the invasion of Poland in 1939 details the major combat units arrayed for the Soviet surprise attack on Poland on September 17, 1939. As a result of joining battle after the Germans had already launched their invasion, the Soviets, prepared for battle in secrecy, met comparatively limited resistance. Several skirmishes between the German and Soviet forces did occur, but neither government was prepared for starting a larger conflict, and these were soon referred to as "misunderstandings".

Before the invasion there were created two "fronts" as a form of the Army Group based on Byelorussian Special Military District (BOVO) into the Byelorussian Front and Kiev Special Military District (KOVO) into the Ukrainian Front.

Like the Germans, the Soviets employed two primary offensive axes, each managed by a Front. Each Front commander had at his disposal a mobile group of forces created from cavalry and mechanised troops; a precursor of the cavalry-mechanised groups of the Second World War.

The effects of the purge are visible in the ranks of the commanders in the order of battle, with only one Army commander serving in the appropriate rank of Komandarm, in this case 2nd Class (Komandarm 2nd rank, Russian: командарм 2 ранга), the rest serving in being Corps (Komcor) and Divisional (Komdiv) Commander rank (Russian: комкор, комдив)

== Belorussian Front ==
Covered north-eastern sector of Polish front from Byelorussian Special Military District
Komandarm 2nd rank Mikhail Kovalyov
Chief of Staff Komkor Maksim Purkayev

Polotsk Army Group (Note: According to narod.ru, the 3rd Army also included the 150th Rifle Division (in Odessa Military District as third echelon))
Komkor Vasily Kuznetsov

4th Rifle Corps

27th Rifle Division
50th Rifle Division

Lepelska Group (Note: Staging area in and around the city of Lepiel)

5th Rifle Division
24th Cavalry Division
22nd Tank Brigade
25th Tank Brigade

Minsk Army Group
Komdiv Nikifor Medvedev

16th Rifle Corps

2nd Rifle Division
100th Rifle Division

3rd Cavalry Corps

7th Cavalry Division
36th Cavalry Division
6th Tank Brigade

BSSR Border Troops
Kombrig Ivan Bogdanov

Dzerzhinsk Cavalry-mechanised Group
Komkor Ivan Boldin

5th Rifle Corps

4th Rifle Division
13th Rifle Division

6th Cavalry Corps

4th Cavalry Division
6th Cavalry Division
11th Cavalry Division

15th Tank Corps

2nd Tank Brigade
21st Tank Brigade
27th Tank Brigade
20th Motorised Rifle Brigade

Tenth Army (Note: Transferred from the Kalinin Military District)
Komkor Ivan Zakharkin

11th Rifle Corps

6th Rifle Division
33rd Rifle Division
121st Rifle Division

Slutsk Army Group
Komdiv Vasily Chuikov

8th Rifle Division
29th Tank Brigade
32nd Tank Brigade
23rd Rifle Corps

52nd Rifle Division
Dnieper Flotilla

== Ukrainian Front ==
Covered southern sector of Polish front from Kiev Special Military District
Komandarm 1st rank Semyon Timoshenko
Chief of Staff Kombrig Nikolai Vatutin

Shepetovka Army Group
Komdiv Ivan Sovetnikov

15th Rifle Corps

45th Rifle Division
60th Rifle Division
87th Rifle Division

8th Rifle Corps

44th Rifle Division
81st Rifle Division
36th Light-Tank Brigade (Note: BT tanks)

UkrSSR Border Troops
Komdiv Vasiliy Osokin

Volochysk Army Group
Komkor Filipp Golikov

2nd Cavalry Corps

3rd Cavalry Division
5th Cavalry Division
14th Cavalry Division
24th Light Tank Brigade (Note: 237 BT tanks)

17th Rifle Corps

96th Rifle Division
97th Rifle Division
10th Heavy-Tank Brigade (Note: 58 T-28 and 20 BT-7 tanks)
38th Light-Tank Brigade (Note: 142 T-26 tanks)

Kamienets-Podolsky Army Group
Komandarm Ivan Tyulenev

13th Rifle Corps

72nd Rifle Division
99th Rifle Division

Front Cavalry Group (Note: From 28 September; initially part of Twelfth Army)
4th Cavalry Corps

32nd Cavalry Division
34th Cavalry Division
26th Independent Light-Tank Brigade (Note: T-26 tanks)

5th Cavalry Corps

9th Cavalry Division
16th Cavalry Division
23rd Independent Light-Tank Brigade (Note: BT tanks)

25th Tank Corps (Note: Subordinated to Twelfth Army)

4th Light-Tank Brigade
5th Light-Tank Brigade (Note: BT and T-38 tanks)
1st Motor Rifle Brigade

== See also ==
War and campaign articles

World War II
Invasion of Poland

Other forces in the Polish Campaign

German order of battle for Operation Fall Weiss
Polish army order of battle in 1939

== Sources ==
- Meltyukhov M.I., Soviet-Polish wars. Military-political confrontation 1918-1939, Moscow, Veche, 2001. (Russian: Мельтюхов М.И. Советско-польские войны. Военно-политическое противостояние 1918-1939 гг. — М.: Вече, 2001.)
