= 32nd Army (Soviet Union) =

- 32-я армия
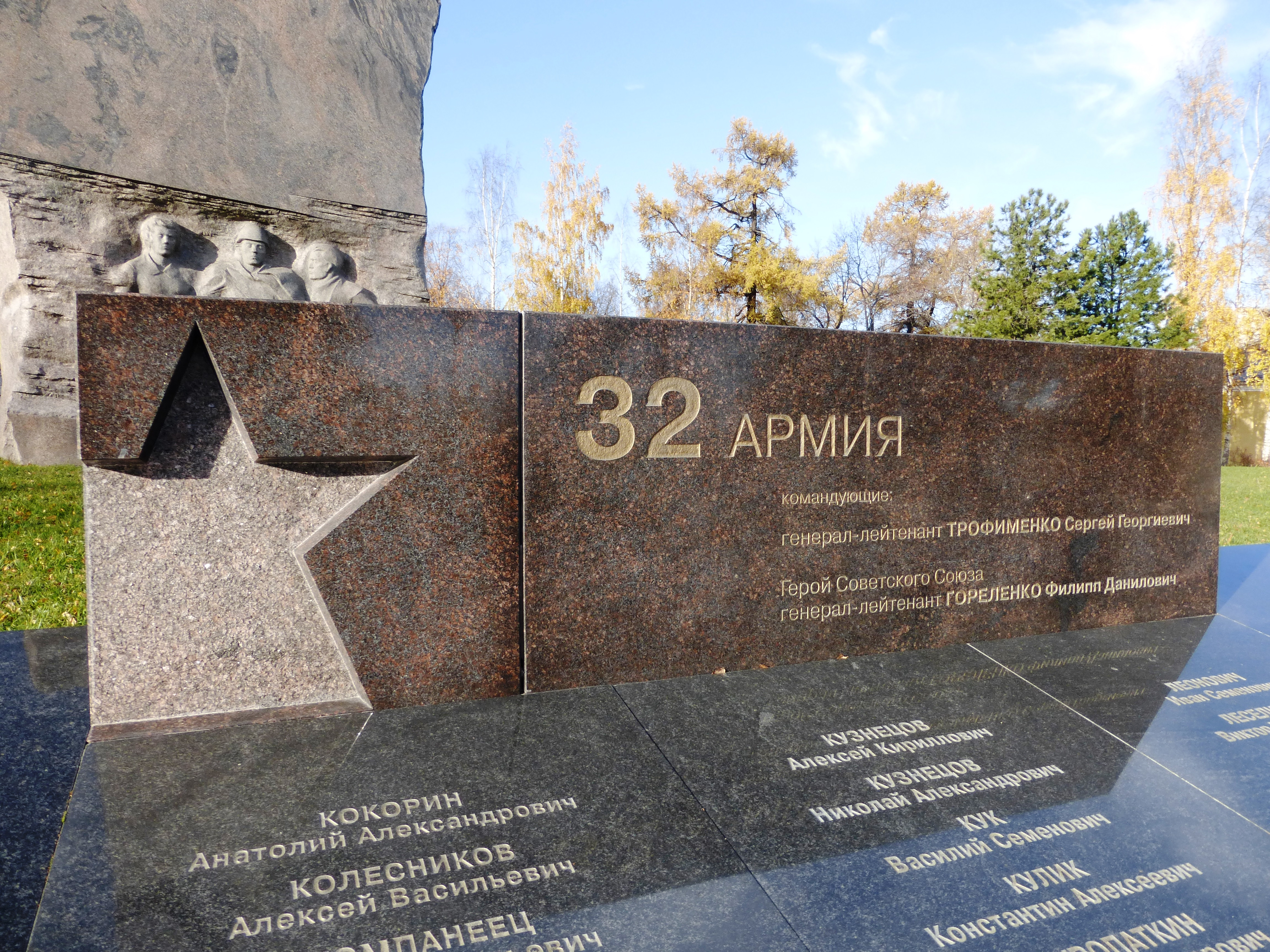
- Memorial
- Active: 16 July – 12 October 1941; 10 March 1942 – August 1945; 1981 – 1988
- Country: Soviet Union
- Branch: Red Army
- Type: Combined arms
- Size: Field Army
- Engagements: World War II; Battle of Moscow; Svir–Petrozavodsk Offensive

Commanders
- Notable commanders: See List

The 32nd Army (Russian: 32-я армия) was a formation of the Soviet Army during World War II. The army was formed twice during the war, disbanded as part of the post-war demobilization and then reformed in 1969 to protect the Soviet-Chinese border.

== First formation ==
The army was formed on 16 July 1941 in the Moscow Military District near the cities of Naro-Fominsk, Kubinka, and the settlement of Dorokhovo. The army was formed with four divisions of Moscow Militia. The assigned units included the 2nd, 7th, 8th, 13th Moscow Militia divisions. In addition, on 20 July 1941, 18th Moscow People's Militia Divisions was assigned to the Army at positions west of Moscow. The 18th had a strength of 10,000.

On 18 July the army was incorporated into the Moscow line of defense and took up defensive positions in the vicinity of Karacharovo. On 30 July the army was assigned to the Reserve Front. On 1 October, the army included the 2nd Rifle Division, 8th Rifle Division, 29th Rifle Division and the 140th Rifle Division. It also included the 685th Corps Artillery Regiment, 533rd Antitank Artillery Regiment, 877th Antitank Artillery Regiment, 200th Naval Artillery Battalion and the 36th Antiaircraft Artillery Battalion.

On 3 October the army was heavily engaged in a defensive battle against German forces advancing on Vyazma as part of the northern wing of Operation Typhoon. On 5 October the army was reassigned to the Western Front and two days later along with the 16th, 19th, 20th and 24th Armies were encircled by the German 4th and 9th Armies and 3rd and 4th Panzer Groups. The 32nd Army was disbanded on 12 October 1941. Small elements of the army were able to break out of the encirclement and were assigned to the 16th and 19th Armies.

Commanders:

- Lieutenant General Nikolai Klykov (July - August 1941)
- Major General Ivan Fedyuninsky (August - September 1941)
- Major General Sergei V. Vishnevskii (September 1941 - October 1941)

== Second formation ==
Stavka ordered the army reformed on 2 March 1942. The reformation was completed on 10 March 1942. The army was formed from the Medvezhegorshaya and Maselskaya Operational Groups of the Karelian Front. On 1 April 1942 the army was composed of:

37th Rifle Division
71st Rifle Division
186th Rifle Division
263rd Rifle Division
289th Rifle Division
313th Rifle Division
61st Naval Rifle Brigade
65th Naval Rifle Brigade
66th Naval Rifle Brigade
1st Ski Brigade
2nd Ski Brigade
196th Ski Battalion
197th Ski Battalion
198th Ski Battalion
17th Mortar Battalion
208th Antiaircraft Artillery Battalion
6th Aerosleigh Battalion
9th Aerosleigh Battalion
36th Aerosleigh Battalion
227th Separate Tank Company
261st Engineer Battalion
1211th Sapper Battalion
1212th Sapper Battalion

Until the end of May 1944 the 32nd Army defended the frontier in the Medvezhyegorsky District and from 21 July to 9 August the army participated in the Svir-Petrozavodsk Offensive, when part of the army reached the Finish border in the vicinity of Longonvara. When Finland was knocked out of the war on 19 September 1944 the army was relegated to guarding the Finnish border. During the offensive the army consisted of:

289th Rifle Division
313th Rifle Division
376th Rifle Division
65th Naval Rifle Brigade
80th Naval Rifle Brigade
33rd Ski Brigade
1237th Gun Artillery Regiment
173rd Mortar Regiment
280th Mortar Regiment
298th Mortar Regiment
63rd Guards Mortar Regiment (minus 297th Battalion)
275th Antiaircraft Artillery Regiment
208th Antiaircraft Artillery Battalion
446th Antiaircraft Artillery Battalion
376th Tank Battalion (minus Tank Company KV)
21st Aerosleigh Battalion
22nd Aerosleigh Battalion
26th Aerosleigh Battalion
261st Engineer Battalion

Composition on 1 November 1944:

135th Rifle Corps

176th Rifle Division
289th Rifle Division
313th Rifle Division

621st Mortar Regiment
63rd Guards Mortar Regiment
275th Antiaircraft Artillery Regiment
32nd Antiaircraft Artillery Battalion
446th Antiaircraft Artillery Battalion
29th Tank Brigade
90th Separate Tank Regiment
261st Engineer Battalion
6th Flamethrower Battalion
194th Flamethrower Company
196th Flamethrower Company

On 15 November 1944 the 32nd Army was put into the Reserve of the Supreme High Command (Stavka Reserve) and on 21 April 1945 was directly subordinated to the Stavka.

On 1 May 1945 the Army was composed of:

203rd Gun Artillery Brigade
621st Mortar Regiment
275th Antiaircraft Artillery Regiment
194th Flamethrower Company
196th Flamethrower Company

The army was disbanded in August 1945. Its commanders included Major General Sergei Trofimenko (March - June 1942); and Lieutenant General Filipp D. Gorelenko (June 1942 - 1945).

== Third formation ==
This army was reformed using the command staff of the 1st Army Corps in 1981 when the Central Asian Military District was reestablished to protect the Soviet-Chinese border.

Composition:

71st Motor Rifle Division - The 71st Motor Rifle Division was formed in 1984 at Semipalatinsk. The 71st Motor Rifle Division became the 5202nd Base for Storage of Weapons and Equipment (VKhVT) (Semipalatinsk) in 1989. The 5202nd Base for Storage of Weapons and Equipment became part of the Armed Forces of the Republic of Kazakhstan after the dissolution of the Soviet Union in 1991-92.
155th Motor Rifle Division (Ust-Kamengorsk)
203rd Motor Rifle Division (Karaganda)
78th Tank Division (Ayaguz)

Lieutenant General Valeriy Samsonov commanded the army from 1987 until September 1989, by which time it had become 1st Army Corps.

In March 1988 32nd Army became 1st Army Corps, and then 4 June 1991 1st Army Corps was redesignated as the 40th Army at Semipalatinsk.
