= 341st Rifle Division =

341st Rifle Division (September 1, 1941 – May 19, 1942) 341st Rifle Division (May 1, 1944 – 1955) 54th Rifle Division (March 1955 - June 4, 1957) 54th Motor Rifle Division (June 4, 1957 - 1997) 62nd Separate Motor Rifle Brigade (1997 - 1998) 35th Weapons and Equipment Storage Base (1998 - 2007) (Disbanded)
- Active: 1941–2007
- Country: Soviet Union; Russia
- Branch: Red Army
- Type: Infantry
- Size: Division
- Engagements: Barvenkovo–Lozovaya Offensive Operation; Second Battle of Kharkov; Continuation War; Lapland War

Commanders
- Notable commanders: Col. Aleksandr Ilich Shchagin; Col. Ivan Vasilievich Obydenkin; Col. Ignatii Alekseevich Moskalev; Maj. Gen. Ivan Vasilievich Terentev

The 341st Rifle Division was first formed in September 1941, as a standard Red Army rifle division, at Stalingrad. It was a "sister" unit to the 335th Rifle Division, which was formed at about the same time and place and shared a very similar combat path in its first formation. It was assigned to the southern sector of the Soviet-German front during the winter counteroffensive, but was effectively destroyed during the German spring offensive that formed the Izium Pocket, and was soon disbanded. The division was formed again almost exactly two years later, this time in the Karelian Front, facing Finland, and saw only limited action in the Continuation War before being assigned to coastal defense duties during 1945. The 341st Rifle Division continued to serve well into the Cold War, eventually being re-designated and becoming a motorized rifle division.

== 1st Formation ==
The division first formed on September 1, 1941 in the North Caucasus Military District at Stalingrad. Its basic order of battle was as follows:

- 1139th Rifle Regiment
- 1141st Rifle Regiment
- 1143rd Rifle Regiment
- 901st Artillery Regiment

Col. Aleksandr Ilich Shchagin was assigned to command of the division on the day it began forming, and he continued in command throughout the existence of this formation. The division's personnel contained a significant number of non-Russian nationality. In October, while still barely formed, the division was assigned to 57th Army, which was also just in the process of forming-up in the Reserve of the Supreme High Command. In December the division and its Army moved to join Southwestern Front, taking part in the winter counter-offensive which led to the creation of the Izium salient south of Kharkov. By the end of January 1942, the 341st had been transferred to 9th Army in Southern Front, on the southern flank of the salient. It was still holding this position on May 17, as Southwestern Front was attacking northwards from the salient towards Kharkov, when the 14th Panzer Division of 1st Panzer Army smashed through the division's flank, driving its remnants north and west into what became the Izium Pocket. While 9th Army continued to carry the 341st in its order of battle until June 1, in fact it had broken up within 48 hours of the German attack; while Colonel Shchagin and many other personnel managed to escape, the division was effectively disbanded on May 19.

== 2nd Formation ==
About two years later, almost to the day, a new 341st Rifle Division began forming on May 1, 1944, in the Karelian Front, based on the 77th Naval Rifle Brigade in 19th Army.

=== 77th Naval Rifle Brigade ===
This brigade formed from October to December in the North Caucasus Military District, based on personnel from the Black Sea Fleet and the naval schools. In January 1942, the unit made a remarkably long move to join 14th Army in Karelian Front, the northernmost part of the front, facing Finnish and German forces. In April the brigade shifted slightly southwards to 19th Army, still in the same Front, defending the Kandalaksha area. By August the 77th was organized for defensive operations as follows:

- 3 rifle battalions
- Mortar Battalion (24 50mm, 24 82mm mortars)
- Artillery Battalion (3 batteries of 3 76mm cannon each)
- Antitank Battalion (12 45mm guns)
- Sapper Company
- Antitank Rifle Company
- Signal Platoon
- Truck Company (19 vehicles)

As Karelian Front was relatively quiet, the brigade was kept on a "short" establishment, with only about 100 men per rifle company. It remained in the same are under the same commands until it was dissolved in the spring of 1944.

=== Continuation War ===
The order of battle of this new formation of the 341st was mostly based on lower regimental numbers made available by the conversion of regular rifle divisions into Guards units in 1942-43, as follows:

- 251st Rifle Regiment
- 279th Rifle Regiment
- 281st Rifle Regiment
- 1017th Artillery Regiment
- 48th Antitank Battalion
- 299th Sapper Battalion
- 789th Signal Battalion
- 93rd Reconnaissance Company

Col. Ivan Vasilievich Obydenkin commanded the reformed division until mid-October. He was briefly succeeded by Col. A. V. Molokov until Col. Ignatii Alekseevich Moskalev took command on October 28, which he would hold for the duration of the war. The division served directly under 19th Army through September, taking part in the limited fighting that pushed Finnish forces back from Kandalaksha towards Alakurtti. In November the 341st moved even farther north, to the 131st Rifle Corps in 14th Army, which by then was simply a garrison force in northern Finland. In January 1945, the division left the active forces completely, assigned to the Belomorsky Military District on coastal defense duties.

== Postwar ==
The 341st ended the war without any battle honors or unit decorations. In July 1945, when the 14th Army was disbanded, the division, still with the 131st Rifle Corps, was re-stationed at Alakurtti. It was under the command of Maj. Gen. Ivan Vasilievich Terentev from January 1947 to February 1951.

The division was eventually transferred to the 6th Army of the Leningrad Military District, and in March 1955, it was redesignated the 54th Rifle Division. On 4 June 1957, it was converted into the 54th Motor Rifle Division (Military Unit Number 42395). From 1962 to 1966 Valentin Varennikov commanded the disvision. In 1964 armed forces inspectors tested the division, and it was awarded as one of the six top divisions of the Ground Forces of the USSR Armed Forces by order of the Minister of Defence.

In July 1970, the 54th's 279th Motor Rifle Regiment was used to form the new 91st Motor Rifle Division, and was replaced by the 221st Guards Motor Rifle Regiment. In 1976, the division participated in Exercise Sever, during which it was recognized as one of the best. Between January and February 1980, it sent troops to fight in the Soviet–Afghan War.

In 1987, its 338th Guards Tank Regiment was downsized into the 82nd Separate Tank Battalion. On 19 November 1990, according to Treaty on Conventional Armed Forces in Europe data, the 54th had 40 T-80 main battle tanks, 39 PT-76 amphibious tanks, 125 BTR and MT-LB armored personnel carriers, 60 D-30 howitzers, and 12 BM-21 Grad multiple rocket launcher systems. During the Cold War, the division was maintained at 68% strength as a Ready Division - Reduced Strength I (US Category II) division.

In 1997, the division was downsized into the 62nd Separate Motor Rifle Brigade, but a year later was converted into the 35th Weapons and Equipment Storage Base. The base continued as part of the Leningrad Military District until its 2007 disbandment.
