= Vyborg–Petrozavodsk offensive =

1944 Soviet military offensive against Finland during the Continuation War

- Part of the Continuation War during the Eastern Front (World War II)
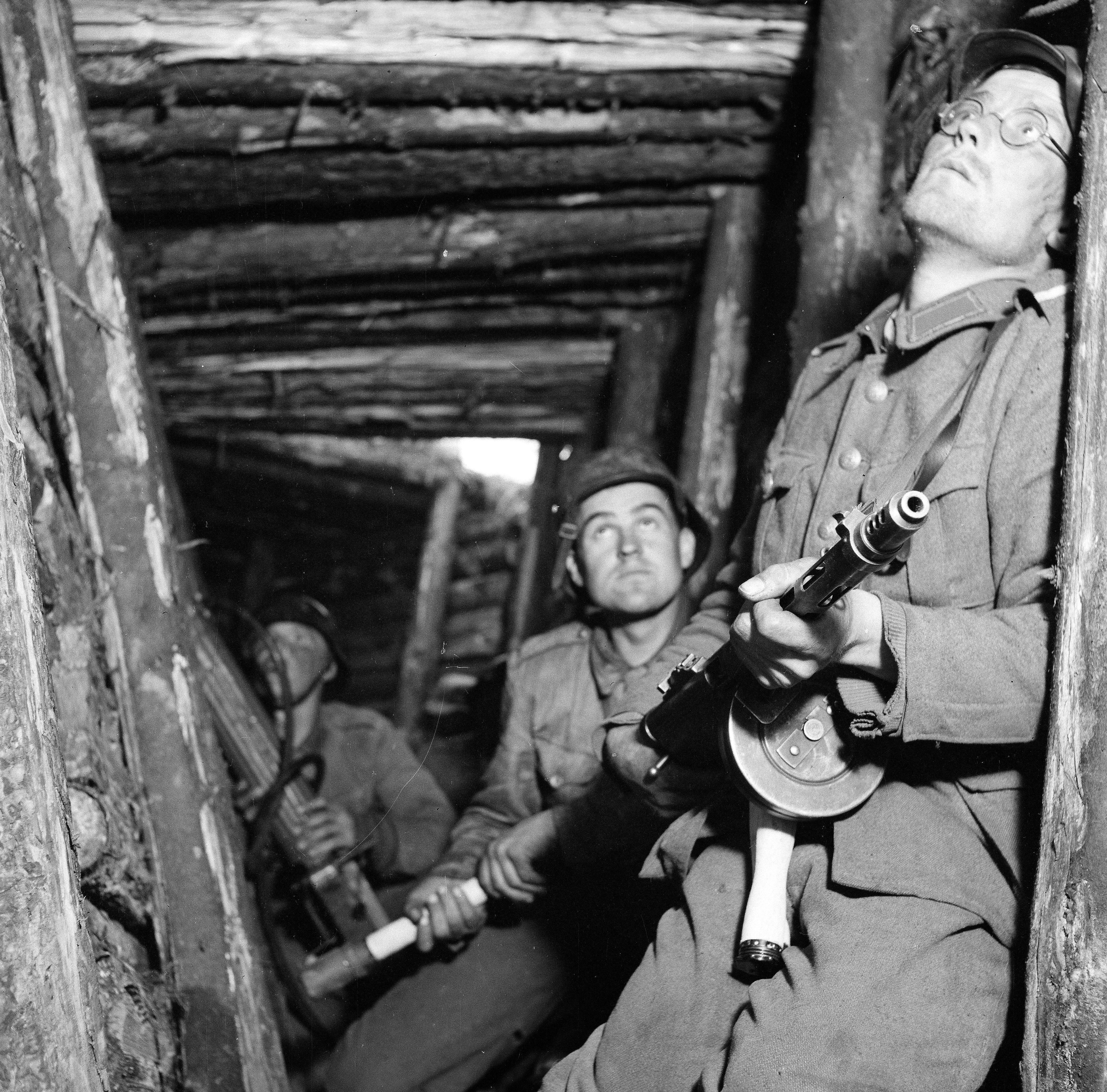
- Finnish soldiers at the VT-line of fortifications during the offensive in June 1944
Date	June 10 – August 9, 1944 (1 month, 4 weeks and 2 days)
Location	Karelo-Finnish SSR, Leningrad Oblast
Result	Moscow Armistice
Territorial changes	Soviets recapture East Karelia and southern Karelian Isthmus.

Belligerents
Finland; Germany	Soviet Union

Commanders and leaders
(Finland) C.G.E. Mannerheim (Finland) Karl Lennart Oesch	(Soviet Union) Leonid Govorov (Soviet Union) Kirill Meretskov

Units involved
II Corps; III Corps; IV Corps; V Corps; VI Corps	(Soviet Union) Leningrad Front: 21st Army; 23rd Army; 56th Army; (Soviet Union) Karelian Front: 7th Army; 32nd Army

Strength
75,000 soldiers (Karelian Isthmus, initially); 268,000 soldiers (after reinforcements both Karelian Isthmus and Karelian Front); 1,930 artillery pieces 110 tanks / assault guns (30–40 modern, StuG III, T-34, KV-1); 248 aircraft (only 50 were modern, Bf 109, Ju 88)	451,500 soldiers (+5 new divisions were sent later to Karelian Isthmus); 10,500 artillery pieces 800 tanks 1,600 aircraft

Casualties and losses
Karelian Isthmus: 9,300 killed and 32,400 wounded (June 9 – July 15); 3,000 captured (all fronts); Karelian Front: 3,600 killed and 12,100 wounded (June 9 – July 15). Based on database of deceased Finnish military persons excluding non-battle deaths. Total: 12,932 soldiers killed (June 9 – July 15 in all fronts and all military branches) and 2,786 (July 16 – August 9.); Deceased soldiers in all fronts (June 9 – August 9, 1944): 10,008 KIA, 2,870 DOW (died of wounds), 2,802 MIA and confirmed deceased, 39 died in captivity, 726 non-combat deaths.	Vyborg Offensive: Leningrad Front (10–20 June); 6,018 KIA & MIA; 24,011 WIA & sick. Finnish estimation based on Soviet data and recalculations of losses including reinforcements and all units (Tapio Tiihonen, 2000): 60,000 KIA, WIA, MIA (52,000 losses of units and 8,000 losses of replacements.); Svir-Petrozavodsk Offensive: Karelian Front (21 June – 9 August); 16,924 KIA & MIA; 46,679 WIA & sick. Virojoki-Lappeenranta Offensive (Finnish estimate based on Soviet data): Leningrad Front (21 June – 15 July); 15,000 KIA & MIA; 53,000 WIA & sick. Finnish estimation (Tapio Tiihonen, 2000): 129,000 KIA, WIA, MIA (based on recalculation of Soviet data, units, reinforcements. Tiihonen found contradictory information there.); Total military losses of Soviet offensive in Karelian Isthmus: (June 9 – July 18): 100,000 to 189,000 KIA, WIA and MIA; Baltic Fleet and Lake Ladoga / Lake Onega Detachments (Whole duration) 732 KIA & MIA; 2,011 WIA & sick. (Note: Soviet "irrecoverable" losses include killed, dead from wounds, non-combat deaths and missing. "Medical" casualties include wounded and sick.) (Note: David Glantz agrees with Krivosheev's figures, but says that fighting in the Viborg area between June 21 – July 14 is not included and estimates the additional casualties at 30,000, thus bringing the total Soviet casualties to about 100,000.)

The Vyborg–Petrozavodsk offensive or Karelian offensive (Note: Finnish historiography uses titles Kesän 1944 suurhyökkäys (lit. 'Summer 1944 great offensive') or Kesän 1944 torjuntataistelut (lit. 'Summer 1944 Defensive Battles').) was a strategic operation by the Soviet Leningrad and Karelian Fronts against Finland on the Karelian Isthmus and East Karelia fronts of the Continuation War, on the Eastern Front of World War II. The Soviet forces captured East Karelia and Vyborg/Viipuri. After that, however, the fighting reached a stalemate.

The operations of the strategic offensive can be divided into the following offensives:

- Viipuri (10–20 June) by the Leningrad Front
- Virojoki-Lappeenranta (21 June – 15 July) by the Leningrad Front
  - Koivisto landing (20–25 June) by the Baltic Fleet
- Svir–Petrozavodsk (21 June – 9 August) by the Karelian Front
  - Tuloksa landing (23–27 June) by the Soviet Ladoga Flotilla

== Background ==
In January 1944, Soviet forces raised the Siege of Leningrad and drove the German Army Group North back to the Narva-Lake Ilmen-Pskov line. Finland had conducted peace negotiations intermittently during 1943–1944 with the Western Allies and the USSR, but no agreement had been reached. Finland asked for peace conditions again in February, but the Finnish Parliament (Eduskunta) considered the terms received impossible to fulfill. After Finland had rejected these peace conditions, and Germany halted the Soviet advance, the Stavka (Main Command of the Armed Forces of the Soviet Union) started to prepare for an offensive to force Finland's exit from the war.

== The plan ==
In order to destroy the Finnish Army and to push Finland out of the war, the Stavka decided to conduct the Vyborg–Petrozavodsk offensive. The strategy called for a two-pronged offensive, one from Leningrad via Vyborg to the Kymi river, and the second across the Svir River through Petrozavodsk and Sortavala past the 1940 border, preparing for an advance deep into Finland. The plan called for the Finnish army to be destroyed on the Karelian Isthmus, and the remains blocked against the western shore of Lake Ladoga between the two assaults and Lake Saimaa.

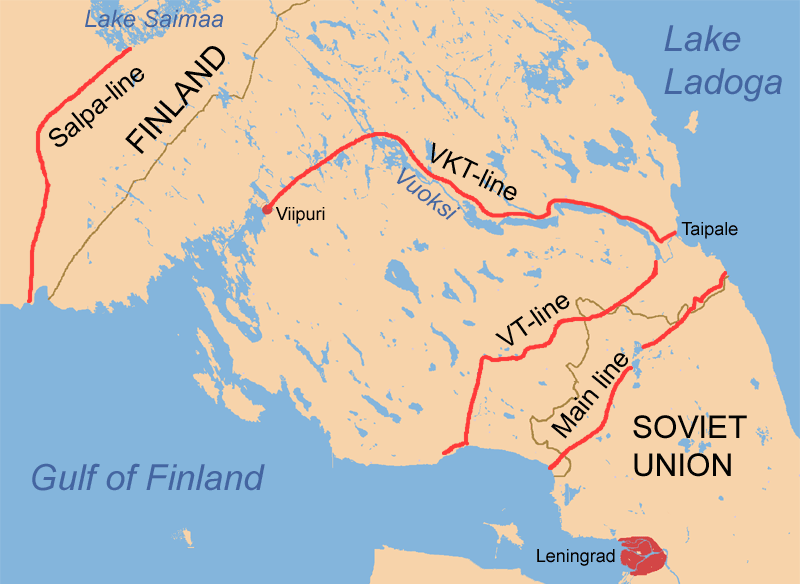
Map showing the four main defence lines built by Finland; Main line, VT-line, VKT-line and the Salpa-line. The Soviet offensive was stopped at the VKT-line.

The main strategic objectives of the offensive were to push Finnish forces away from the north of Leningrad, to drive Finland out of the war, and to create better conditions for a major offensive to the south against Germany.

The Finnish army had been preparing defensive fortifications since 1940, and three lines of defense on the Karelian Isthmus. The first two were the "Main line", which was constructed along the frontline of 1941, and the VT-line (Vammelsuu-Taipale) running 20 km behind the main line. These lines were reinforced with numerous concrete fortifications, but the work was still ongoing. The third line, the VKT-line (Viipuri-Kuparsaari-Taipale) was still on the drawing board and the construction of the fortifications began in late May 1944 at the Vyborg sector of the line. At the northern bank of the Svir River (Finnish: Syväri) the Finnish army had prepared a defence in depth area which was fortified with strong-points with concrete pillboxes, barbed wire, obstacles and trenches. After the Winter War, the Salpa Line was built behind the 1940 border with concrete bunkers in front of the Kymi river.

To overcome these obstacles, the Stavka assigned 11 divisions and 9 tank and assault gun regiments to the Leningrad Front. That meant that there were 19 divisions, 2 division strength fortified regions, 2 tank brigades, 14 tank and assault gun regiments at the Isthmus, all of which included over 220 artillery and rocket launcher batteries (almost 3,000 guns/launchers). Around 1,500 planes from the 13th Air Army and the Baltic Fleet naval aviation also contributed to the operation which included surface and naval infantry units of the Baltic Fleet.

To the east of Karelia, the Stavka planned to use 9 divisions, 2 sapper brigades, 2 tank brigades and 3 assault gun regiments, raising the whole strength to 16 divisions, 2 fortified regions, 5 separate rifle brigades, 2 tank brigades, 3 assault gun regiments and 3 tank battalions. They were supported by Lake Ladoga and Lake Onega naval flotillas and the 7th Air Army.

== Vyborg-Vuoksi offensive ==
At the Karelian Isthmus front there were on average 120 Red Army artillery pieces for every kilometer of frontline, with up to 220 artillery pieces per kilometer on the breakthrough sector at Valkeasaari. In addition to heavy coastal artillery of the Leningrad area and the guns of the capital ships of the Baltic Fleet (Oktyabrskaya Revolutsiya, Kirov, Maxim Gorky) the Stavka had also assigned heavy siege artillery (280 to 305 mm) in support of the attack.

On June 9, a day before the main Soviet offensive, the 1,600-strong 13th Air Army conducted a major aerial assault. At the same time, artillery units of the Leningrad Front and the Baltic Fleet shelled Finnish positions for 10 hours. The Finnish Army was in a well-fortified position, but the Soviet air attacks surprised the defending Finnish army and undermined its resistance causing many Finnish units to retreat and suffer from thousands of desertions.

=== Valkeasaari ===
On June 10, the Soviet 21st Army, spearheaded by 30th Guards Corps, opened the offensive on the Valkeasaari sector, which was defended by 1st Infantry Regiment of Finnish 10th Division. During the day, the Soviet units captured frontline trenches and destroyed fortifications, shattering the first Finnish defense line at the breakthrough sector.

=== Kuuterselkä ===
On June 13, the Soviet 21st Army's offensive reached the partially completed VT-line. The defensive position was breached at Kuuterselkä by June 15. Though the line was breached, the Finnish resistance managed to delay further Soviet advances.

=== Siiranmäki ===
Simultaneous to Kuuterselkä, the Soviet 23rd Army attempted to break through at a perceived weak point in the Finnish VT-line at Siiranmäki. Siiranmäki was the first place where Finnish troops were able to use anti-tank Panzerfausts and Panzerschrecks which were imported from Germany. Though Finnish troops managed to contain the Soviet breakthrough at Siiranmäki, the VT-line had already been breached at Kuuterselkä. Soviet 98th Infantry Corps fighting in Siiranmäki against Finnish 7th Regiment announced to have lost during period of June 13 to June 16: 3 784 soldiers including 887 killed in action based on their own report. Red Army and especially Guard units took heavy losses in Siiranmäki-Kuuterselkä with 20,000 KIA, MIA or WIA.

=== Vyborg ===
The Finnish army attempted to buy time by engaging in delaying actions during its retreat so that additional forces from East Karelia would be able to reach the front, and the VKT-line could be prepared for combat. However, on June 19 forces of the first Leningrad Front had reached Vyborg, and the first phase of the offensive was completed by the capture of the city on June 20, when the defending Finnish 20th Infantry Brigade fled in panic. Though Leningrad Front had managed to capture Vyborg within the time table set by the Stavka they had been unable to prevent retreating Finnish units from regrouping and fortifying on the VKT-line. Unlike many battles on the Eastern Front in the Karelian Isthmus the Red Army was unable to trap any large Finnish units – not even a single battalion. Finnish forces had managed to retreat. At the same time more and more Finnish reserves were arriving at the VKT-defense line, where terrain was much more favorable for defenders than for the armored Red Army units. The Soviet 21st Army also faced logistics issues after its fast 120 km advance to west.

== Virojoki–Lappeenranta offensive ==
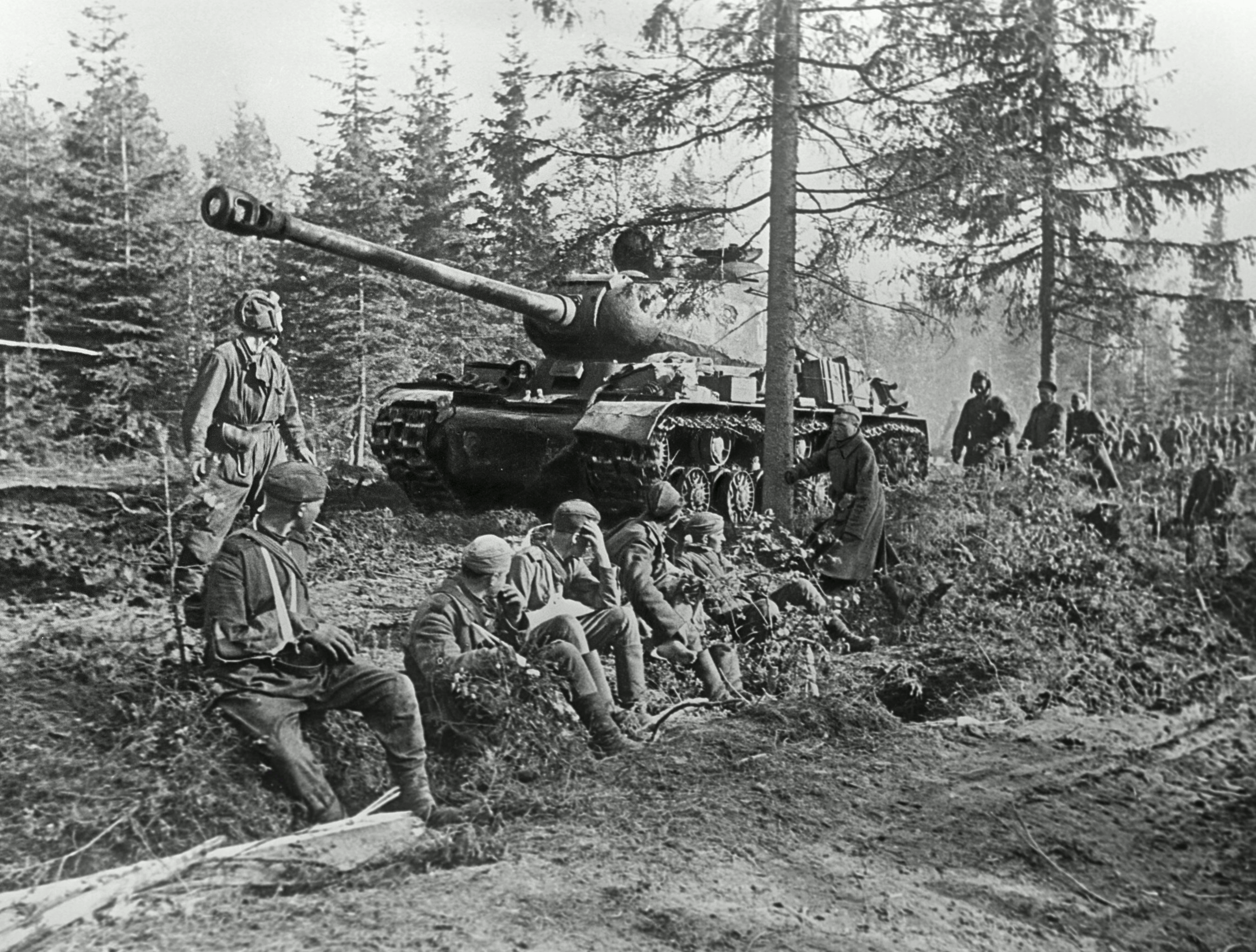
IS-2 heavy tank moving through forest

Mannerheim had asked for German help, and on June 17 Gefechtsverband Kuhlmey arrived in Finland, followed on June 21 by the 303rd Assault Gun Brigade (at half strength) and the 122nd Infantry Division. Also, new German anti-tank weapons, Panzerfausts and Panzerschrecks, were issued to Finnish army troops. Late on June 21, German foreign minister von Ribbentrop arrived to Finland in an attempt to extract political concessions from the military help.

On June 21, the Stavka ordered continued attacks on the Imatra–Lappeenranta–Virojoki defence line, on the Salpa Line sector of the front. Another group would attack northwards to Käkisalmi (now Priozersk, Russia) and surround the Finns defending the eastern VKT-line while preparations would be made for an advance towards Kotka, Kouvola and the Kymi river.

On June 21 the Finnish government asked for Soviet peace terms. The response arrived on the next day and it demanded Finnish capitulation before any conditions could be presented. This created confusion in the Finnish government, where Ryti and Tanner were willing to repeat the inquiry about the conditions, while others opposed the capitulation. During the meeting Marshal Mannerheim was called, and he stated that the Soviet demand constituted an unconditional surrender. When Paasikivi's negotiation trip to Moscow in March 1944, which was initiated by the Soviet ambassador in Stockholm, but turned out to be a Soviet dictation of terms, was remembered, the government decided to interpret the Soviet response as a demand for unconditional surrender. It seemed that after Finnish unwillingness to accept the Soviet proposals in April 1944, owing to excessive reparation demands, Finland was to be offered only unconditional surrender. This was in line with Churchill's statement that as an Axis belligerent, Finland's surrender must be unconditional. The Soviet authorities denied this interpretation in an article published in Pravda on July 2, 1944, Furthermore, it is also known that at June 26 Stalin even told American ambassador Harriman that US diplomats could try to clarify to the Finns that he did not intend to take over the country. An unsigned draft document called "The Terms for Finnish Unconditional Surrender" was found in October 1993 in the Russian Foreign Ministry archive, which led some historians to conclude that unconditional surrender was indeed the Soviet goal. According to Baryshnikov this and similar drafts for the other countries the USSR was at war with existed since 1943, and they were replaced by new ones in the summer of 1944.

With Finnish army reinforcements, there were 268,000 Finnish army troops with 2,350 guns (of which 1,030 field artillery, 393 heavy mortars), 110 tanks/assault guns and 250 planes facing the two Red Army Fronts; 40% of the men and guns, and all the tanks were on the Isthmus. In total, the Red Army had a 1.7:1 advantage in men, 5.2:1 advantage in guns, and 6–7:1 advantage in planes and tanks against the Finnish army. However Finnish forces with 14 infantry divisions (a' 13,200), one armour division (9,200), 5 infantry brigades (a' 6,700), one cavalry regiment (4,300), 7 independent front border jaeger battalions, coastal defence forces and HQ/Corps artillery units even with full strength had less than 230,000 men. Less than 40 Finnish tanks and assault guns were modern (StuG III, T-34, KV-1) and less than 60 aircraft too (Bf 109 dayfighter and Ju 88 medium bomber). With these figures Red Army material advantage was about 1:20 at mid June 1944 (armour and aircraft).

The offensive continued on June 25, when the Red Army breached the VKT-line at Tali, between the Vyborg Bay and the Vuoksi river. On June 26 the Finnish president Ryti gave the guarantee to Ribbentrop that Finland would fight to the end alongside Germany. When it became evident that a breakthrough was not possible at Ihantala, the Leningrad Front attempted to double envelope the defenders with the twin assaults at the Vyborg Bay and Vuosalmi. However, the Finnish army was able to hold its positions on these sectors of the front. On July 12 the Stavka ordered Leningrad front to release offensive elements from the Finnish front, and on July 15, the Red Army troops were ordered to assume a defensive posture, and offensive elements (mostly armor) were transferred to the German front for use in Narva offensive and Operation Bagration.

The Red Army continued its attempt to advance westward after the Battle of Ihantala: in Äyräpää until July 18 and in the Battle of Ilomantsi in late July and early August. All offensives continued until very end – when there was no chance of a final decisive breakthrough. There hardly were any "limited objectives" on the Karelian Isthmus and Karelia. In the official history of the Great Patriotic War, failed offensives usually disappeared from memory as happened with the Vyborg–Petrozavodosk offensive. After Vyborg, the plan was to reach the Kymi river.

=== Koivisto landing operation ===
After the Soviet offensive on the Karelian Isthmus pushed north past Koivisto, the Finnish forces defending the Koivisto Islands (or in Russian : the Beryozovye Islands) became isolated. After the Soviet 21st Army failed to attack the islands, the Leningrad front ordered the Soviet Baltic Fleet to capture the islands. The initial Soviet landing was contained but the Finnish Navy soon evacuated the defending forces. This movement was largely unopposed. Although the eagerness of the commanders to evacuate preserved the defending forces, the loss of the islands proved costly because the Soviet Baltic Fleet gained a safe route to Vyborg Bay.

=== Tienhaara ===
After capturing Vyborg, the lead elements of the 21st Army attempted to push forward along the main road leading north from Vyborg. Strong artillery support, narrow area of operations, and very favorable terrain made it possible for the Finnish 61st Infantry Regiment to hold the Soviet advance, forcing the 21st Army to attempt to find a more suitable location for breaching the Finnish VKT-line.

=== Tali–Ihantala ===
After 21st Army easily cleared the defending Finnish troops from Vyborg on June 20, the Soviet forces attempted to press on the offensive, but met stubborn Finnish resistance at Tali and were forced to stop. After bringing fresh troops to the front the 21st Army managed to push Finnish lines to Ihantala but failed to create any breakthroughs. The battle fought over the area is considered to be the largest battle in the history of the Nordic countries.

The Soviet 23rd Army joined the offensive by attempting to break through the Finnish lines between Tali and Vuoksi towards Noskua but the repeated Soviet attacks were halted by the highly efficient Finnish artillery. In the end, the battle of Tali–Ihantala was a defensive strategic victory for the Finnish army. It blocked the possibility for the Soviet army to break through to the Finnish heartland and the road to Helsinki. Soviet military losses peaked on 28 June when Leningrad Front reported that it had lost during that single day over 5,000 soldiers including 1,800 killed in action, over 25% more than on 14 June when they reported losing almost 4,000 (including nearly 700 killed in action). The Finnish artillery caused a high proportion of these losses, concentrating deadly firepower with 250 artillery pieces sending 2,000 shells to one small target area the size of just 6 hectares in one minute. Red Army units saw no chances to penetrate through this fire power. The terrain favored the defenders forcing Soviet armor units into narrow death traps. Finnish radio intelligence intercepted many Red Army signals, giving data for effective artillery and air power counterattacks.

=== Vyborg Bay ===
After the initial efforts of the 21st Army in Tali–Ihantala did not produce a breakthrough, the Leningrad Front ordered the 59th Army to capture the islands dominating the Vyborg Bay and perform an amphibious landing on the opposing shore. Though the landings on the islands were ultimately successful, the attempted crossing failed.

=== Vuosalmi ===
As the 21st Army was unable to advance, the 23rd Army attempted a crossing in the Vuosalmi region of the Vuoksi waterway. Though Soviet forces successfully pushed Finnish troops from Äyräpää ridge dominating the crossing and managed to create a strong bridgehead on the opposing side, the defending Finnish troops were able to contain it.

== Svir–Petrozavodsk offensive ==
The Soviet Union's Karelian Front attacked in the Olonets sector of White Karelia on June 20. Weakened Finnish forces proved unable to stop the offensive which reached Olonets on June 25 and on June 29 took Petrozavodsk, one of the main goals of the operation. The long advance and the delaying tactics of the Finnish forces sapped the Soviet strength and the main push of the 7th Army stopped at the Finnish U-line. The Soviet 7th Army and the 32nd Army tried to go around the U-line attacking further to the north but failed to break through the defending Finnish units in battles fought in the wilderness of Karelia. The last attempt to resume the offensive was made further north by two divisions of the Soviet 32nd Army which were defeated by counterattacking Finns in the Battle of Ilomantsi.

=== Svir ===
The Finnish Army had previously withdrawn most of its forces from the southern shore of the Svir River, so when the Red Army offensive started on 21 June, it did not achieve the desired surprise. The Karelian Front's Soviet 7th Army – 37th Guards, 4th and 99th Corps – crossed the river using amphibious vehicles on the following day and secured a bridgehead 8 km deep and 16 km wide. After securing the crossing the Soviet forces continued to chase the withdrawing Finns towards the defenses of the 'PSS'-line.

=== Tuloksa landing operation ===
On June 23, 70th naval infantry brigade attacked and captured a beachhead behind the Finnish lines and also beyond the 'PSS'-line between the Viteleenjoki and Tuuloksenjoki rivers, severing the main road and railroad connections along the shore of Lake Ladoga. As Finns had previously moved most of the coastal defenses to the Karelian Isthmus the Soviet landing met only skeleton defense. Finnish attempts to drive the Soviets into the Ladoga proved unsuccessful but it had pushed the defending Soviets to the difficult position as ammunition and supplies started running low. Situation in the beachhead was improved when the 3rd Naval Infantry Brigade started its landings on the evening of June 24. Bad weather hampered the efforts the brigade was finally unloaded on the June 26 and it was able to link up with the advancing 7th Army.

Landing caused some trouble for the defending Finns as it cut the railroad line running along the coast of lake Ladoga. Cutting of the road was of less consequence as Finns had already previously constructed new parallel roads further inland in fear of landing. However the heavy traffic of the withdrawing forces totally ruined the new road forcing some of the equipment to be abandoned. Though the Finns managed to withdraw to the new defensive line the advancing Soviet units broke through the new line at Vitele already on June 28 forcing the Finns to continue delaying the advancing Soviets while withdrawing towards the 'U'-line. For the Red Army the Svir–Petrozavodsk offensive cost losses of at least 45,000 soldiers while Finnish losses were 11,000. The Soviets themselves estimated having captured 933 Finnish artillery pieces and 18,000 rounds of ammunition however many of the guns had been spiked.

=== Nietjärvi ===
The Finnish Army retreated further, delaying the Karelian Front's advance, allowing for the U-line, running northwards from Pitkäranta to Loimola and Kivijärvi, to be reinforced. The first 7th Army units reached the U-line on July 10, but were fatigued following the long offensive and failed to breach the defence line. Soviet attempts to break through the U-line at Nietjärvi ended with clear Soviet failure on July 17 when a Finnish counterattack regained the lost positions on the U-line causing severe losses to the Soviet 114th Division. Once the attempts to gain breakthrough into the Finnish U-line had failed Red Army attempted to go around the line by flanking it through the frontier north of the line. As Finns countered the flanking maneuvers the fighting extended far into the frontier in a makeshift extension of the U-line however Soviet 7th Army managed neither to flank the extending Finnish line nor to break through it. Soviet losses in Nietjärvi were 7,000 KIA, MIA and WIA while Finnish forces lost 1,200 soldiers.

=== Ilomantsi ===
North of the U-line the Soviet 32nd Army, which consisted of 176th, 289th, 313th and 368th Rifle Divisions, advanced after capturing Petrozavodsk towards small Finnish town of Ilomantsi while being delayed by defending Finnish 21st Brigade. Lack of suitable roads and the slow progress of 7th Army forced 32nd Army to move 313th and 368th Rifle Divisions to support 7th Army's offensive but they were blocked by the Finnish 1st Division. The Soviet attack towards Ilomantsi with the remaining 2 divisions (176th and 289th) was initially successful, and the divisions reached the border of 1940 on July 21, (the only Soviet units which did so in the offensive), but in the ensuing battle the divisions were surrounded and forced to escape the encirclement suffering heavy losses (est. 7,000-8,000 KIA, MIA, WIA when including losses from the last week of July in the Ilomantsi area) and being forced to leave their artillery and other heavy equipment behind.

== Aftermath ==
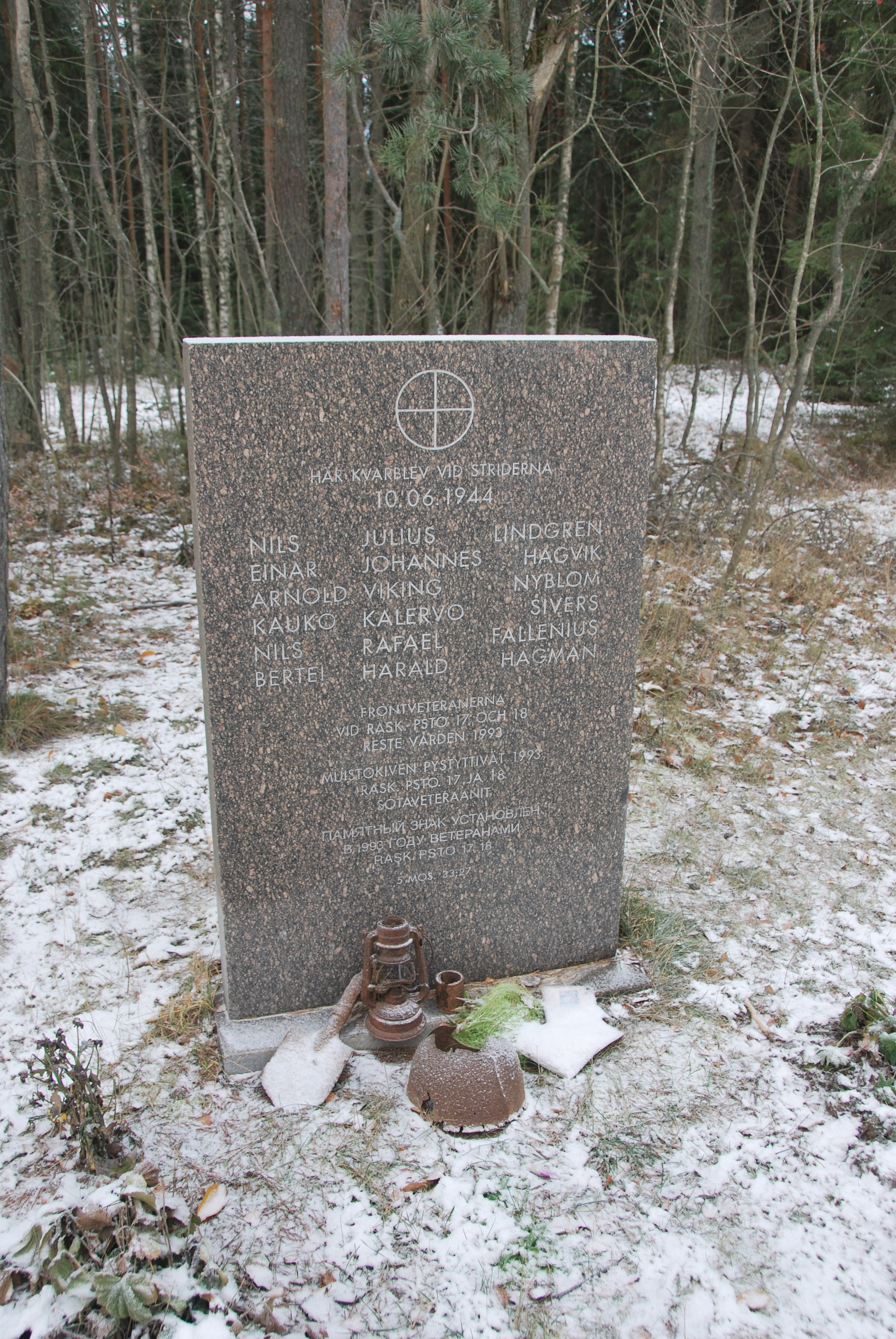
Memorial in Kalelovo

The offensive succeeded in reclaiming East Karelia and driving the Finnish army to the northern side of Vyborg Bay and the Vuoksi River. It also reopened the original route of the Murman Railway and the White Sea Canal to the Karelian Front forces. However, the Soviets failed to achieve multiple objectives. The offensive failed to breach the VKT-line and reach the Kymi River as ordered by the Stavka. The goal of destroying the Finnish Army was also not met, and by the end of summer 1944 the Finnish armed forces were stronger and better equipped than ever before.

Despite the losses suffered, the Finnish army managed to avoid encirclement of battalion-size units (Note: Opinion in the Finnish HQ was that pocketed units are wasted and should therefore try to escape. Soviet combat practice helped the Finnish army; the official history of IR 58, which fought against the Soviet army starting from Valkeasaari to Viborg, notes that several times Finnish units were able to survive only because of the rigid adherence to operating area boundaries by the Soviet units, and inappropriate micromanagement by Soviet army commanding officers.) and benefited from supplies delivered by Germany.

Based on documents found after 1991 in Russia the most important point of the plan – the destruction of Finnish forces in Karelian Isthmus in a determined time and reaching a certain line (Kotka) – had failed. Despite that, the psychological effect of the offensive on the Finnish leadership should not be underestimated. Even though the Finns had stopped the offensive at the Karelian Isthmus after 100 km and the Battle of Ilomantsi had shown that the Finnish army was still a viable fighting force, it was estimated that should the Soviet offensive continue at its full strength, the Finnish army would be able to last for three months at most. For Finland the overall situation required peace especially when Germans had not much chance to keep Finns on their side longer. At the same time western allies had already made their crucial breakthrough in Normandy and were driving fast to the east.

During the height of the offensive in June 1944, the Finns asked for negotiations and the Soviets responded with a demand for surrender, which in Finland was interpreted as an ambiguous demand for unconditional surrender and rejected. After the fighting had reached a stalemate in August 1944, another attempt to seek peace was made by Finland. In September 1944 the Soviets offered peace terms that were roughly the same as in April 1944, though some of the demands, which had been seen by the Finns as impossible to concede to, were reduced. The $600 million war reparations were halved and the time to pay them off was extended. This was probably in part brought about by international pressure exerted on the Soviets, especially by the U.S. and Britain. However, after the ceasefire the Soviets demanded that payments be based on 1938 prices which nearly doubled the actual amount to be paid, and so the Finns complained that the Soviets only pretended to lower the reparations.

Despite not achieving all of the goals set by the Stavka, the offensive forced Finland from the war and to accept Soviet peace terms, or at least was an important factor leading to the ceasefire negotiations that were resumed a month after the offensive had ended.

In Soviet propaganda, this offensive was listed as one of Stalin's ten blows.

== Bibliography ==
- Bergstrom, Christer (2008). Bagration to Berlin – The Final Air Battles in the East: 1944–1945. Ian Allan. ISBN 978-1-903223-91-8.
- Erickson, John (1993). The Road to Berlin: Stalin's War with Germany. New Haven: Yale University Press. ISBN 0-300-07813-7.
- Gebhardt, James (1990). "The Petsamo-Kirkenes Operation: Soviet Breakthrough and Pursuit in the Arctic, October 1944" (PDF). Leavenworth Papers (17). Fort Leavenworth: Combat Studies Institute. ISSN 0195-3451. Archived from the original (PDF) on October 24, 2009.
- Gilbert, Martin (1989). Second World War. London: Weidenfeld and Nicolson. ISBN 0-297-79616-X.
- Glantz, David (2002). The Battle for Leningrad 1941–1944. Lawrence: Kansas University Press. ISBN 0-7006-1208-4.
- Glantz, David; House, Jonathan (1998). When Titans Clashed: How the Red Army Stopped Hitler. Lawrence: Kansas University Press. ISBN 978-0-7006-0899-7.
- Juutilainen, Antti (1994). Ilomantsi, lopultakin voitto (in Finnish). Rauma: Sotahistoriallinen seura.
- Krivosheev, Grigoriy (1997). Soviet Casualties and Combat Losses in the Twentieth Century. London: Greenhill Books. ISBN 978-1-85367-280-4.
- Leskinen, Jari (2005). Juutilainen, Antti (ed.). Jatkosodan pikkujättiläinen (in Finnish). WSOY. ISBN 951-0-28690-7.
- Mannerheim, G. (1952). Mannerheim, muistelmat, toinen osa (in Finnish). Helsinki: Otava.
- Mannerheim, G. (1953). The Memoirs of Marshal Mannerheim. London: Cassell.
- Manninen, Ohto (1994). Molotovin cocktail, Hitlerin sateenvarjo (in Finnish). Painatuskeskus. ISBN 951-37-1495-0.
- Moisala, Uuno E.; Alanen, Pertti (1988). Kun hyökkääjän tie pysäytettiin (in Finnish). Keuruu: Otava. ISBN 951-1-10386-5.
- Newton, Steven H. (1995). Retreat from Leningrad: Army Group North, 1944/1945. Atglen, Philadelphia: Schiffer Books.
- Platonov, S. P. (1964). Bitva za Leningrad (in Russian). Moscow: Voenizdat Ministerstva Оborony.
- Raunio, Ari; Kilin, Juri (2008). Jatkosodan Torjuntataisteluita 1942–44 (in Finnish). Keuruu: Otava.
- Reiter, Dan (2009). How Wars End. Princeton University Press. ISBN 978-1400831036.
- Saressalo, Leo; et al. (1983). Kutsui ääni isänmaan, Jalkaväkirykmentti 58 (in Finnish). Jurva: JR58: n asevelitoimikunta. ISBN 951-99412-2-3.
- Stenman, Kari (1998). Finnish Aces of World War 2. Osprey Publishing. ISBN 978-1855327832.
- Turtola, Martti (2001). Mannerheim-kirja [Mannerheim Book] (in Finnish). Helsinki: Ajatus. ISBN 951-0-18860-3.
- Vehviläinen, Olli (2002). Finland in the Second World War. Palgrave Macmillan. ISBN 978-0-333-80149-9.
- Zolotarev, Vladimir, ed. (1999). Русский архив: Великая Отечественная. Ставка ВКГ: Документы и материалы 1944–1945. (in Russian). Vol. 16. Moscow: Тerra. ISBN 5-300-01162-2. Archived from the original on 2012-03-06.
- Ziemke, Earl (2002). Stalingrad to Berlin. The German Defeat in the East. Washington, DC: Government Printing Office. ISBN 978-0-16-001962-3.
- Ziemke, Earl F. (1959). The German Northern Theater of Operations 1940–1945. Washington: Department of the Army.
