= 7th Army (Soviet Union) =

- 7-я армия
- Active: 1939 – December 1944
- Country: Soviet Union
- Branch: Red Army
- Type: Combined arms
- Size: Field army several Rifle corps
- Part of: Northern Front then Karelian Front
- Engagements: Winter War, Finnish reconquest of Ladoga Karelia, Svir-Petrozavodsk Operation

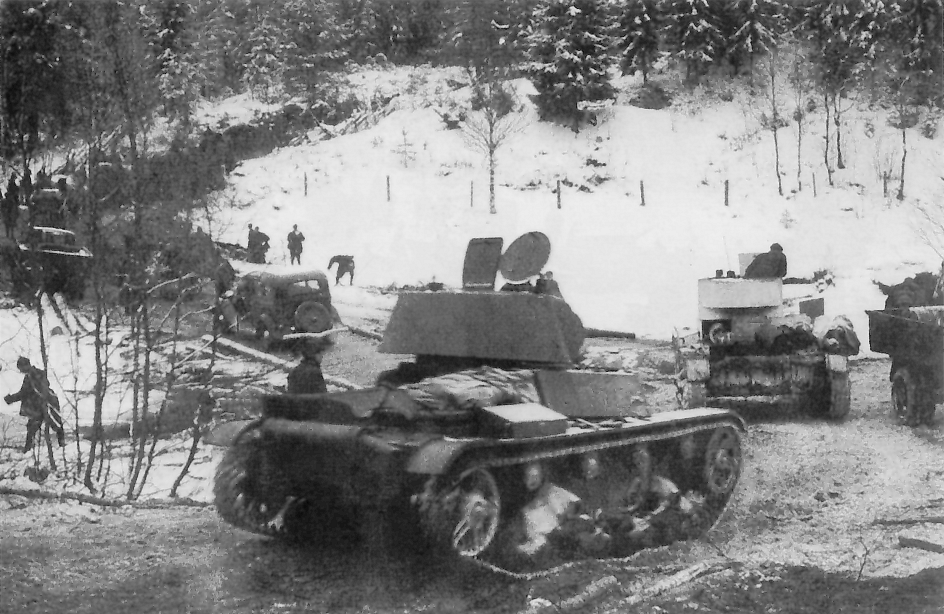
T-26 light tanks of the 7th Army during advance into Finland, 2 December 1939.

The 7th Army (Russian: 7-я армия) was a Soviet Red Army field army during World War II, primarily against Finland. It was disbanded in 1944.

It first saw action in the 1939–40 Winter War against Finland. In November 1939, just before the initial Soviet attack, it consisted of the 19th Rifle Corps (24th, 43rd, 70th, 123rd Rifle Division); 50th Rifle Corps (49th, 90th, 142nd Rifle Division); 10th Tank Corps; 138th Rifle Division; and an independent tank brigade.

The Army was first under Commander (Second rank) Vsevolod Yakovlev, but he was removed from command of his army and returned to Leningrad. Command of the war operation Kirill Meretskov was called-off due to extensive failures and heavy casualties, and he replaced Yakovlev as the commander of the Seventh Army.

7th Army was reformed in Autumn (second half of) 1940 in the Leningrad Military District. Before the German Operation Barbarossa began it covered the Soviet frontier to the north of Lake Ladoga. After 24 June 1941 the army included the 54th, 71st, 168th and 237th Rifle Divisions, the 26th Fortified Region, the 55th Composite Aviation Division, and some artillery and engineering formations. It became part of the Northern Front, then the Karelian Front, and conducted defensive operations in Karelia, however losing Ladoga Karelia to the Finns in July–August 1941. On 25 September 1941 it was renamed the 7th Separate Army, directly subordinate to Stavka, (VGK – the Supreme High Command), and it remained in that status until February 1944. In the middle of October 1941 – June 1944 it defended the Svir River line between Lakes Onega and Ladoga.

From June to August 1944 the army, comprising now the 37th Guards, 4th, 94th, and 99th Rifle Corps, 150th and 162nd Fortified Regions, and a number of artillery, tank, engineering and other units, as part of the Karelian Front, participated in the Svir–Petrozavodsk Operation. It was disbanded in the beginning of January 1945. On the basis of its headquarters the 9th Guards Army of the Airborne Forces was created on 18 December 1944.

== Commanders ==
The Army was commanded by the following officers.

- Komandarm 2nd Rank Vsevolod Yakovlev (September – December 1939)
- Army General Kirill Meretskov (December 1939 – June 1941)
- Lieutenant-General Filipp D. Gorelenko (June – September 1941 and November 1941 – June 1942);
- Army General Kirill Meretskov (September – November 1941)
- Lieutenant-General Sergey Trofimenko (July 1942 – January 1943)
- Major-General Alexey Krutikov (January 1943 – August 1944), (promoted to lieutenant-general in April 1943);
- Lieutenant-General Vladimir Gluzdovsky (August – November 1944)
