= 289th Rifle Division =

- Active: 1st formation: July–September 1941; 2nd formation: October 1941 – July 1946
- Country: Soviet Union
- Branch: Red Army
- Type: Rifle division
- Engagements: World War II; 1st formation: Battle of Kiev; 2nd formation: Continuation War; Svir-Petrozavodsk Offensive

The 289th Rifle Division (Russian: 289-я стрелковая дивизия) was an infantry division of the Soviet Union's Red Army, formed twice. The division was first formed in the summer of 1941, after the German invasion of the Soviet Union, and was sent to the front and destroyed in the Battle of Kiev in September. The division was formed a second time in October 1941 from the 5th Rifle Brigade, a separate infantry brigade fighting in the Continuation War against Finnish and German troops in Karelia. The new division spent most of the war in Karelia and in the summer of 1944 fought in the Vyborg–Petrozavodsk Offensive, which resulted in the end of the Continuation War in September. The division was stationed at Belomorsk in Karelia until its disbandment after the end of World War II in July 1946.

== First Formation ==
The 289th Rifle Division began forming from reservists on 10 July 1941 at Lubny. Its basic order of battle included the 1044th, 1046th, and 1048th Rifle Regiments, as well as the 281st Artillery Regiment. At the beginning of August, the division was assigned to the Southwestern Front's 26th Army. The division arrived at the 26th Army's positions from 2 to 5 August, taking up a defense along the Dnieper southeast of Kiev. The division fought in the Battle of Kiev and was destroyed in the Kiev pocket in September, along with most of the 26th Army. While the division was officially disbanded on 19 September, its commander and some remnants escaped to provide a cadre for the division's second formation. During its fighting in August, the division suffered disintegration: 76.9% of the division's personnel were reported missing in action between 10 August and 20 August 1941 alone.

== Second Formation ==
The division's second formation was formed on 15 October 1941 from the 5th Rifle Brigade. The 5th Rifle Brigade had been redesignated on 5 October 1941 from the Murmansk Rifle Brigade, which was also called the Grivnik Brigade. The Murmansk Rifle Brigade was originally formed in July 1941. The brigade fought alongside the Soviet 88th Rifle Division against the Finnish J-Group of the Finnish III Corps and the German SS North during Operation Barbarossa. They beat back both forces, forcing the Finno-German troops to retire to the city of Kestenga, near Lake Topozero in September 1941. The brigade consisted of some local militia, the 242nd Rifle Regiment of the 104th Rifle Division and probably an artillery battalion of the same division.

The division fought in Karelia for the rest of the war. In April 1942 it became part of the 32nd Army. From June to August 1944 it fought in the Svir-Petrozavodsk Offensive, during which it fought in the recapture of southern Karelia. The advances made in the offensive resulted in the Finnish ending the Continuation War in September. After the end of the Continuation War, the division became part of the 4th Rifle Corps of the Belomorsky Military District at Belomorsk by May 1945. The division was disbanded there with the corps on 10 July 1946.

== Commanders ==
The following officer commanded the division's first formation.

- Colonel Dmitry Makshanov (10 July – 19 September 1941)

The following officers commanded the division's second formation.

- Colonel Dmitry Makshanov (19 September – 20 October 1941)
- Colonel Nikolai Chernukha (20 October 1941 – 27 March 1942)
- Major General Toivo Tommola (28 March 1942 – 28 June 1944)
- Major General Nikolai Chernukha (29 June 1944 – 9 May 1945)
