= 15th Guards Tank Division =

15th Guards Mozyr Red Banner Order of Suvorov Tank Division
- Active: 1945–1999
- Country: Soviet Union (until 1991); Russia (from 1992)
- Branch: Soviet Ground Forces; Russian Ground Forces
- Type: Armor and mechanized infantry
- Part of: 28th Combined Arms Army (to 1968); Central Group of Forces (1968–1991); Volga-Ural Military District (1990–1999)
- Garrison/HQ: Brest (1945–1968); Milovice (1968–1991); Chebarkul (1990–1999)
- Engagements: Warsaw Pact invasion of Czechoslovakia (Operation Danube)
- Decorations: Order of the Red Banner; Order of Suvorov 2nd class
- Battle honours: Mozyr

The 15th Guards Mozyr Red Banner Order of Suvorov Tank Division (15 gv. td) (Russian: 15-я гвардейская танковая Мозырская Краснознамённая ордена Суворова дивизия (15 гв. тд)) was a tank division of the Soviet Army during the Cold War that became part of the Russian Ground Forces after the dissolution of the Soviet Union.

The division was initially stationed in Belarus postwar, but remained as part of the permanent Soviet garrison in Czechoslovakia after its participation in the 1968 Warsaw Pact invasion of Czechoslovakia. The division was withdrawn to Chebarkul when Soviet forces departed Czechoslovakia and disbanded the during force reductions of the 1990s.

From 1968 the division headquarters Military Unit Number (V/Ch) was 58539.

== History ==
The 12th Guards Mechanized Division was reorganized from the 15th Guards Mozyr Red Banner Order of Suvorov Cavalry Division in 1945–1946 at Brest, and became part of the 28th Army. In September 1954, the 12th Guards Mechanized Division and the 50th Guards Rifle Division as part of the 128th Rifle Corps participated in the Totskoye nuclear exercise, in which they conducted a mock attack through the hypocenter of a nuclear blast on 14 September to demonstrate the capabilities of armor in nuclear war to Soviet military leadership. The infantry and tanks of the division's 41st Guards Mechanized Regiment were the first to advance through the hypocenter, protected only by gas masks. During the 1957 reorganization of the Soviet Army, the 12th Guards Mechanized Division was reorganized as the 33rd Guards Tank Division. The division was redesignated as the 15th Guards Tank Division in 1965 to restore its World War II number. In August 1968, the 15th Guards Tank Division, commanded by Major General Aleksandr Aleksandrovich Zaytsev, and the 30th Guards Motor Rifle Division were sent from the 28th Combined Arms Army to participate in Operation Danube, the Warsaw Pact invasion of Czechoslovakia. Attached to the 38th Combined Arms Army on the Carpathian Front, the division was echeloned behind the 31st Tank Division towards the Carpathian mountain passes into Czechoslovakia.

Both remained in Czechoslovakia as part of the Central Group of Forces after the end of the invasion. The 15th Guards was headquartered at Milovice, the base for the 29th, 239th, and 244th Guards Tank Regiments, the 295th Guards Motor Rifle Regiment, 81st Separate Reconnaissance Battalion, 215th Separate Guards Communications Battalion, 517th Separate Chemical Defense Battalion, 142nd Separate Repair and Recovery Battalion, 119th Separate Medical Battalion, and 910th Separate Material Support Battalion. The 914th Self-Propelled Artillery Regiment was at Trutnov, the 282nd Anti-Aircraft Missile Regiment at Lázně Bohdaneč, and the 535th Separate Missile Battalion and 152nd Separate Guards Engineer-Sapper Battalion at Zduchovice.

As a frontline division based in Europe, the 15th Guards was maintained at near full strength until the end of the Cold War, and fielded 325 T-62 tanks according to 1974 US intelligence data. According to 1985 CIA data, the division had a strength of 9,800 men with 37 T-62 and 282 T-72M tanks, 230 BMP-1 infantry fighting vehicles, seventeen BTR-60, seven BTR-60 or 70, 36 122 mm 2S1 Gvozdika, 36 122 mm howitzer D-30, and 36 2S3 Akatsiya.

External images
- Photographs of the 941st Self-Propelled Artillery Regiment during its withdrawal from Trutnov, August 1990

The 535th Separate Missile Battalion was transferred to the new 442nd Missile Brigade along with the other divisional missile battalions of the Central Group of Forces on 28 August 1988. In July 1989, the 360th Tank Regiment was transferred from the 18th Guards Motor Rifle Division to the 15th Guards Tank Division. The 244th Guards Tank Regiment was renamed the 721st Guards Motor Rifle Regiment in late 1989. In 1990, the division began withdrawing to Chebarkul in the Volga–Ural Military District as Soviet forces pulled out of Europe.

The 721st Guards Motor Rifle Regiment and 81st Separate Reconnaissance and Electronic Warfare Battalion were the last units of the division remaining at Milovice as the division withdrew. According to data released under the Treaty on Conventional Armed Forces in Europe, the 721st Guards fielded 29 T-72, 118 BMP (70 BMP-2, 41 BMP-1, seven BRM-1K), 18 2S1 Gvozdika, 12 2S12 Sani, 9 BMP-1KSh, 2 PRP-3, 1 PRP-4, 1 R-145BM, 1 R-156 BTR, two PU-12, two BREM-2, 2 MT-55A, 24 MT-LBT. The 81st fielded 21 BMP (14 BMP-2 and 7 BRM-1K), 1 R-145BM, 1 R-156 BTR, and two MT-LBT. The division was originally planned to disband on the completion of the withdrawal, but was retained by the Russian Ground Forces.

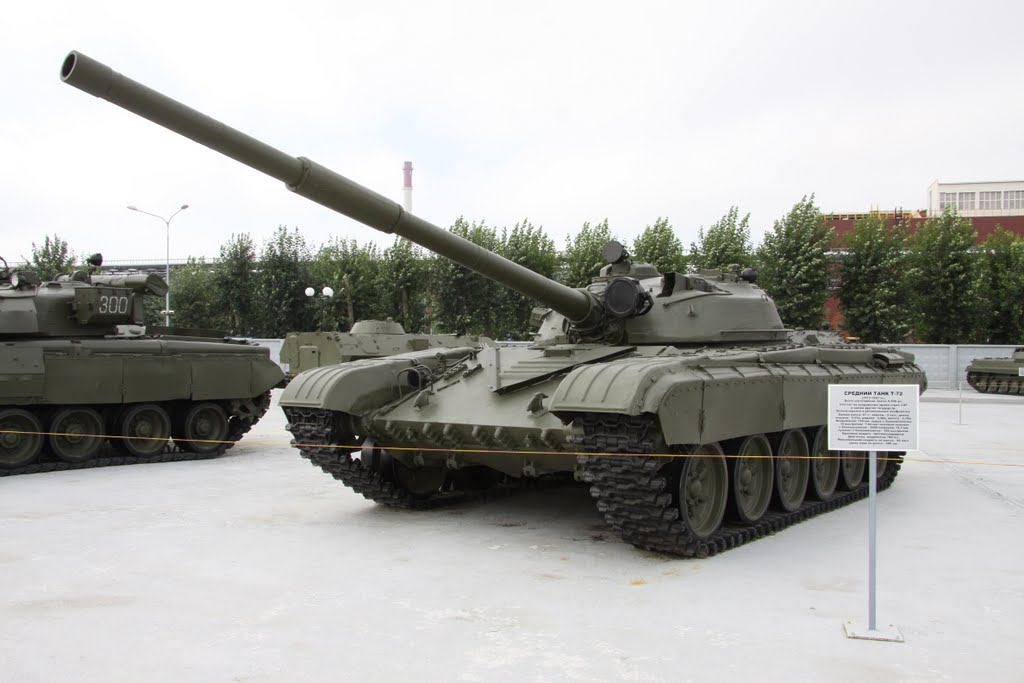
A T-72 of the division on display at the UMMC Military Museum, Verkhnyaya Pyshma

The withdrawal of the 15th Guards Tank Division to Chebarkul was completed in early 1991.

Major General Alexey Maslov, previously deputy division commander, commanded the division between 1994 and 1998.

During the First Chechen War, soldiers from the division were detached to serve in Chechnya with the 276th and 324th Motor Rifle Regiments of the 34th Motor Rifle Division. As the 34th was a low-readiness division with few personnel (the 324th had only four personnel permanently assigned), both regiments had to draw on personnel from the entire Ural Military District before deploying to Chechnya. At Chebarkul, a motor rifle regiment of the 15th Guards Tank Division was used to form one of the two motor rifle battalions of the 276th Motor Rifle Regiment in December 1994. A reconnaissance company commander of the division sent to Chechnya with the 276th, Major Vladimir Korgutov, was made a Hero of the Russian Federation for his leadership in Chechnya.

The division was disbanded in December 1999 with seven of its units at Chebarkul becoming part of the 34th Motor Rifle Division.

The 239th Guards Vitebsk Order of Suvorov Tank Regiment of the division continued to exist as of 7 June 2001, when it was commanded by Colonel N. Shabaldeyev.

A T-72 from the division is on display at the UMMC Military Museum in Verkhnyaya Pyshma.
