= 76th Tank Division =

Tank division of the Soviet military

- Active: 1968–1987
- Country: Soviet Union
- Branch: Soviet Army
- Type: Armored
- Part of: 28th Army
- Garrison/HQ: Brest

The 76th Tank Division was a mobilization tank division of the Soviet Army. It was based in Brest and became a territorial training center in 1987. The training center became a storage base in 1989.

== History ==
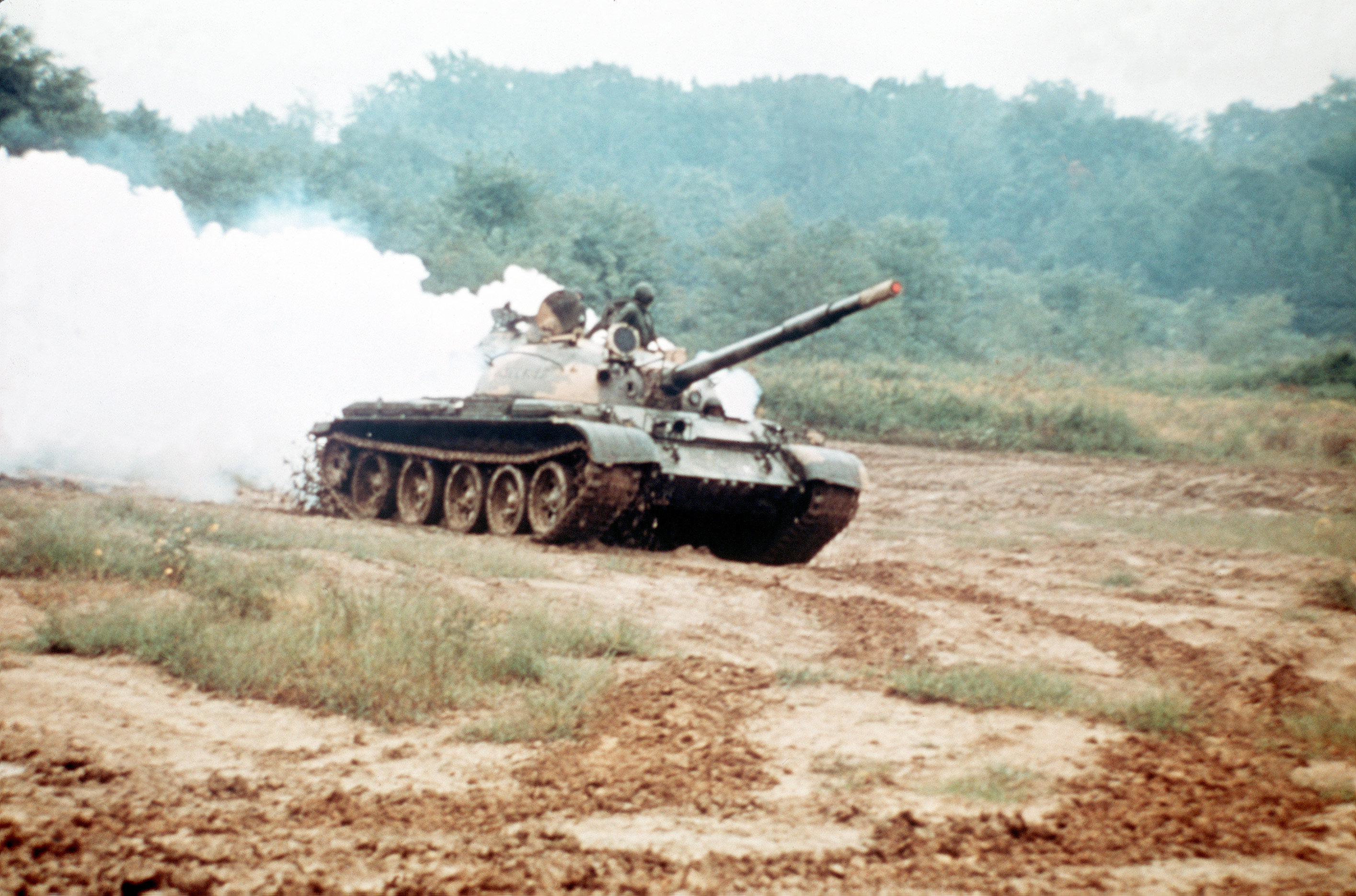
A T-62 tank of the type included in the division's equipment set

The 76th Tank Division was formed on 31 October 1968 as part of the 28th Army to replace the 30th Guards Motor Rifle Division, which became part of the Central Group of Forces after Operation Danube. The division was an unmanned mobilization division, consisting only of an equipment set. Its pre-assigned officers served with the 50th Guards Motor Rifle Division. The division included the 624th and 625th Tank Regiments, and the numbers of the other subunits are not known. On 1 December 1987 it became the 514th Territorial Training Center. On 15 August 1990, it became the 5356th Weapons and Equipment Storage Base. On 19 November 1990, CFE treaty holdings reported that the storage base's equipment set was mostly composed of T-62 tanks.
