= Volga–Ural Military District =

- Приволжско-Уральский военный округ
- Volga–Ural Military District Coat of Arms
- Active: September 1, 1989 – 1992; 2001–2010
- Country: Soviet Union (1989–1991) (Russia) Russian Federation (2001–present)
- Branch: Russian Ground Forces
- Type: Military district
- Headquarters: Yekaterinburg
- Decorations: Order of the Red Banner

The Volga–Ural Military District was a military district of the Russian Ground Forces, formed on 1 September 2001 by the amalgamation of the Volga Military District and the Ural Military District. The headquarters of the Ural Military District, located at Yekaterinburg became the new headquarters of the merged district. In 2010 the District was merged with part of the Siberian Military District to form the new Central Military District.

== Origins ==
The new merged district draws upon the history of the former Ural, Volga, and Kazan Military Districts. The Kazan Military District was first to be formed in the Volga province of the Russian Empire, by order of the Defence Minister of 6 August 1864, as one of fifteen military districts being formed. Each district was intended to command combat formations, as well as act as a military-administrative organ on a regional scale - 'the War Ministry on a local level'. The Kazan Military District, with its headquarters in Kazan, took in the Orenburg, Kazan, and Ufa Governorates, part of the Perm Governorate, and the Ural and Turgay regions. In 1911, the 16th and 24th Army Corps were formed in the district, and just before the First World War, the district's staff was reorganised as the 4th Army.

Following the October Revolution, the staff of the old imperial military districts hindered the creation of the new Soviet Red Army, and to surmount this, a new structure was established on 31 March 1918, including the creation of the new Volga and Ural Military Districts. Much of the fighting in the Russian Civil War took place on the districts' territory. The official Russian Defence Ministry site notes the combat actions of the 20th, 21st, 24th, 25th, 26th, and 27th Rifle Divisions which took place on the eastern front of the war, as well as other formations and units.

After the end of the Civil War the armed forces were reduced and the Ural Military District disbanded, on 21 April 1922. Its territory and troops were transferred to the West Siberian, Volga, Moscow and Petrograd military districts.

The Ural Military District was recreated on 17 May 1935 with its staff located at Sverdlovsk, amid the international tensions caused by the Nazis' rise to power in Germany and the Japanese occupation of Manchuria. The 57th Rifle Division of the Volga District and the 82nd Rifle Division from the Urals were involved in the Battle of Khalkhin Gol with the Japanese in 1939.

== World War II ==
Boundaries of the Ural Military District (in red) on 1 January 1989

During World War II the two districts dispatched over three thousand units to the front, totaling two million men. Five armies, 132 divisions, and over 300 regiments and battalions were established.

In formation in the Volga Military District alone on 1 September 1941 were the 334th, 336th, 338th, 340th, 342nd, 344th, 346th, 348th, 350th, 352nd, 354th, 356th, 358th, and 360th Rifle Divisions, plus the 46th, 89th, and 91st Cavalry Divisions. Among the formations formed during the war was the 153rd Ural Rifle Division, which for its combat record in Belorussia and Smolensk was ranked among the Guards' on 18 September 1941 as the 3rd Guards Rifle Division. Also formed in the Ural District, with the tremendous effort of factory workers there, was the 30th Ural Tank Corps, later to become the 10th Urals-Lvov Tank Corps, today the 10th Guards Uralsko-Lvovskaya Tank Division.

During the war, the city of Kuybyshev (now Samara) served as the alternate capital of the Soviet Union, and the Urals area became the biggest arsenal in the country, with many factories relocated from the west. The 3rd Guards Army arrived from Germany and was redesignated as the new Volga MD headquarters in late 1945. As part of the massive demobilisation exercise of 1945-6 the Kazan Military District was briefly reformed, encompassing the Tatar, Udmurt, Mari and Chuvash ASSRs. It was disbanded in May 1946.

During the Cold War the district's air forces included the Chelyabinsk Higher Military Aviation School for Navigators.

== Postwar ==
Volga–Ural Military District

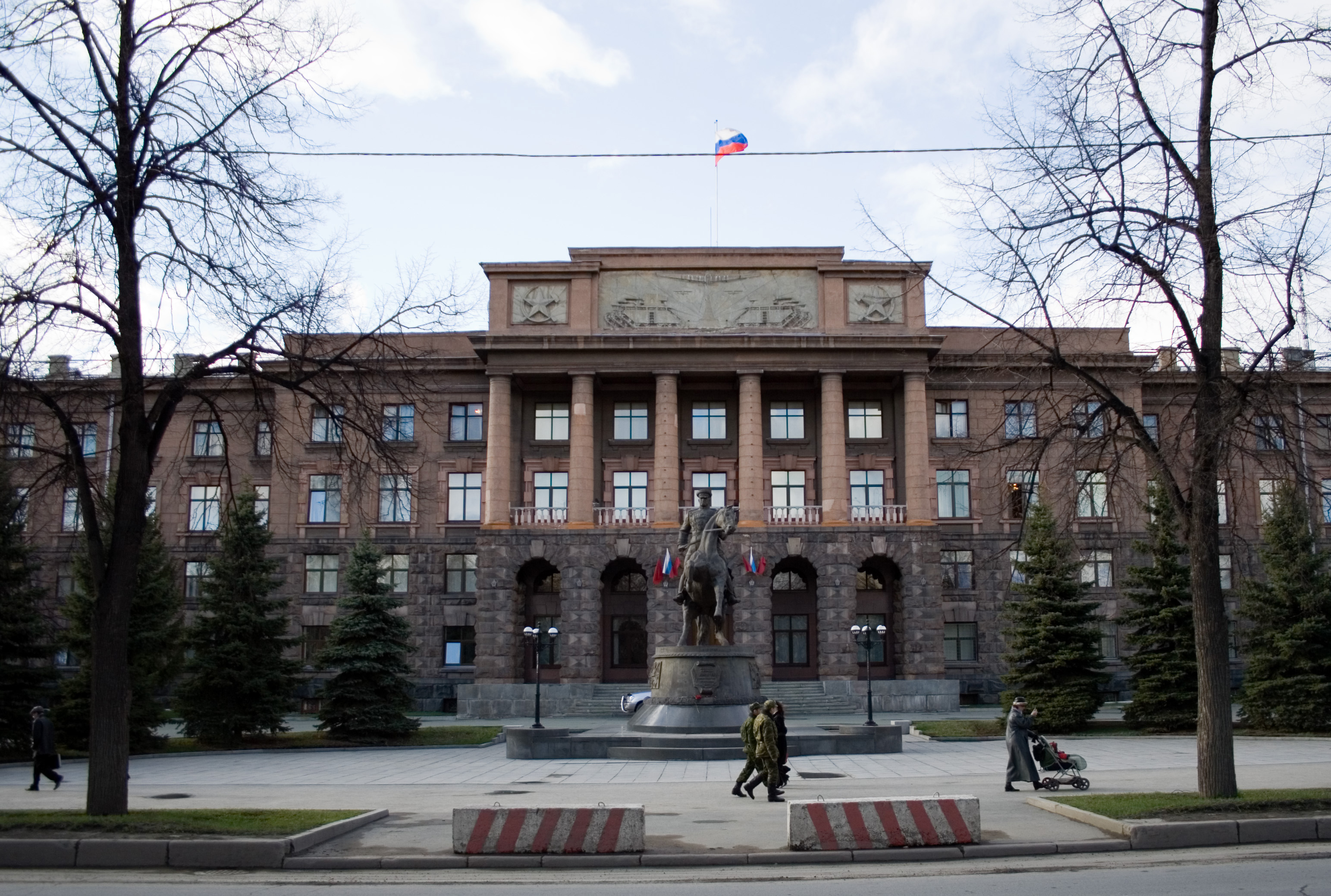
Volga–Ural Military District headquarters

The Ural Military District was commanded between 1948 and 1953 by Marshal Georgi Zhukov, effectively 'exiled' from more important commands. In 1954 the Ural MD controlled the 10th Rifle Corps (91st Rifle Division (Sarapul), 194th Rifle Division (Kirov) and 65th Mechanised Division (Perm)), and the 63rd Rifle Corps (77th Rifle Division (Sverdlovsk) and 417th Rifle Division (Chebarkul), 61st Mechanised Division (Kamyshlov).

In June 1957 the 4th Rifle Division at Buzuluk (at that time in the South Urals MD) was converted into the 4th Motor Rifle Division, but along with numerous other new motor rifle divisions, it was disbanded later, in 1959. That same month the 44th Tank Division was formed from the 61st Mechanised Division at Kamyshlov in the Ural Military District. In 1962 the 44th Tank Division became the 44th Tank Training Division.

Meanwhile, in the Volga Military District, the 123rd Rifle Corps had been redesignated the 40th Army Corps in 1955. After the rifle to motor rifle changes of 1957, it included the 43rd Motor Rifle Division (Kuybyshev, Kuybyshev Oblast) and the 110th Motor. Rifle Division (Shikhany, Saratov Oblast). It became the 40th Army Corps that year also, but was disbanded in 1960.

By a Decree of the Supreme Soviet of the USSR of 15 January 1974, for their large contributions to the strengthening the defence power of the state and its armed protection both the Volga and Ural military districts were rewarded with the Order of the Red Banner. In 1979 Scott and Scott reported the HQ address of the Ural Military District as Sverdlovsk, K-75, Ulitsa Pervomayskaya, Dom 27, which also housed the officers' club.

On 1 September 1989 the Districts were merged with the new headquarters in Kuibyshev (Samara). Colonel General Albert Makashov was appointed commander of the district. However, in July 1992 the Ural District was reformed, as the region had become a near-boundary area with the new states of Central Asia. The decision on restoration of the two separate Volga and Ural military districts was promulgated in Presidential Decree No. 757 of 7 July 1992 and the Order of the Minister of Defence of 25 July 1992.

From 1992 the two districts received large numbers of units and formations returning from the former groups of forces (including the Second Guards Tank Army, and the 16th and 90th Guards Tank Divisions from the Group of Soviet Forces in Germany) and the ex-Soviet republics, the reception of which required enormous effort on behalf of the District HQs and the regional administrations. Many of these units were subsequently disbanded, including the 15th Guards Tank Division, withdrawn from the Central Group of Forces, which appears to have disbanded at Chebarkul in 1999.

In 2009, the Ulyanovsk arms depot explosion happened just before a visit from President Dmitry Medvedev. Four military officers, including the deputy commander of the Volga–Ural Military District for armaments, General Major V. G. Khalitov, were dismissed for 'lack of control' and 'criminal negligence.'

In 2006-07 the district's troops comprised:

- 34th Motor Rifle Division, Yekaterinburg. Military Unit No. 45463. Includes elements of the former 15th Guards Mozyr Tank Division. Structure in 1989-90 included the 341st TR, 105, 276, 324 MRR, and the 239 Arty Regt. Until 1955 the division was designated the 77th Rifle Division; 1957 became 126th MRD; 1965 became 34th MRD. On 1 March 2009 renamed 28th Motor Rifle Brigade.
- Russian 201st Motor Rifle Division, Dushanbe, Tajikistan
- 15th Independent Motor Rifle Brigade (which took part in the command post peacekeeping Exercise Normandie-Nieman 07 in April 2007 with the 1st Mechanised Brigade (France))
- 2nd Guards Red Banner Combined Arms Army, Samara (formerly headquarters Ural Military District)(history closely associated with 2nd Guards Tank Army)
  - 27th Guards Motor Rifle Division, Totskoye
- 5th Air and Air Defence Forces Army (Russian Air Force)
- 473rd District Training Centre

=== Subordinate Units ===
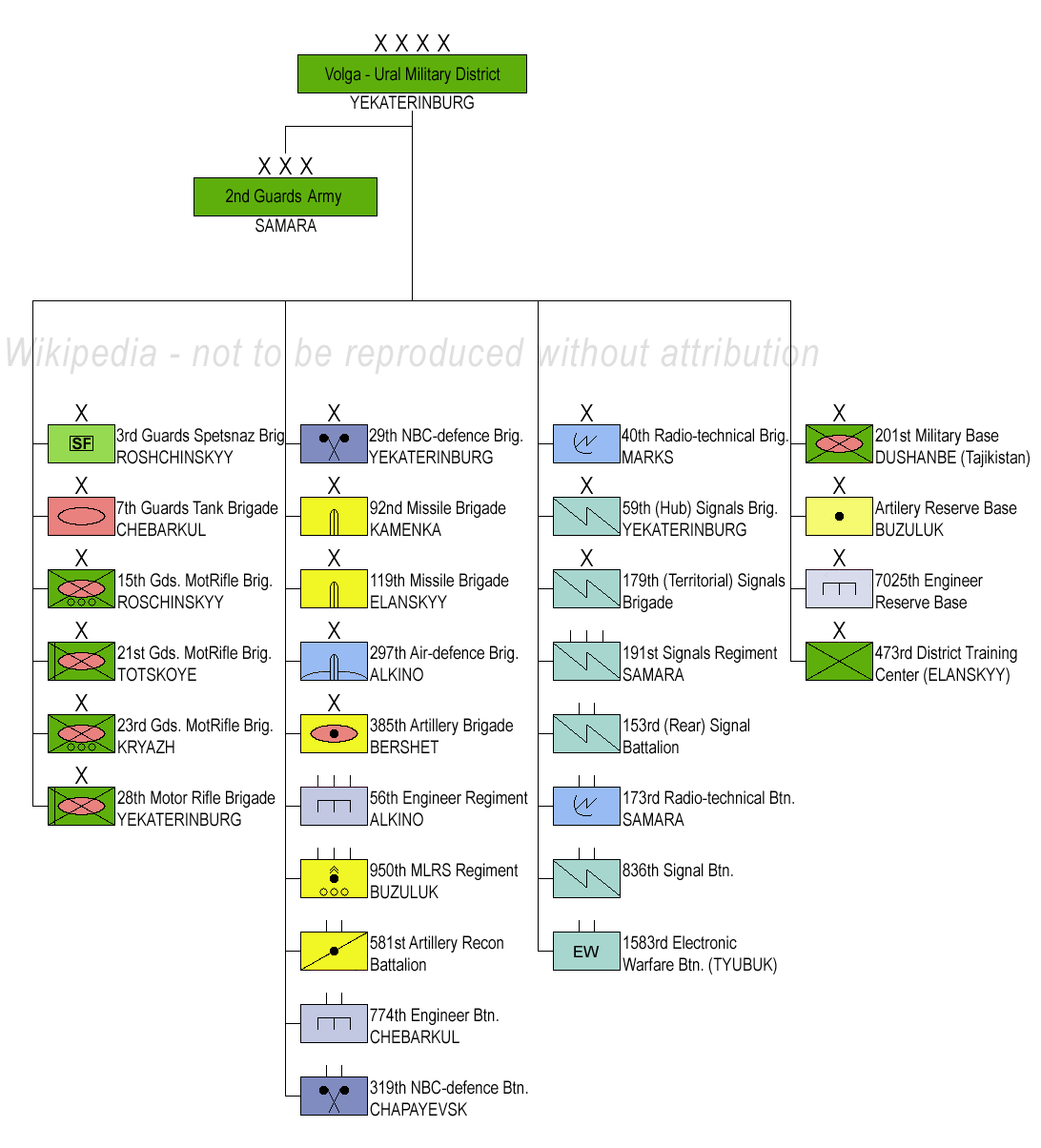
Structure and units of the Volga - Ural Military District 2010

Red Banner Volga–Ural Military District 2010:

- Combat formations:
  - 7th Separate Guards Orenbug Cossack Tank Brigade, in Chebarkul
  - 15th Separate Guards Berlin Motor Rifle Brigade, in Roshchinsky, Samara Oblast equipped with BTR. Military Unit # 90600. Honorifics Berlin Red Banner Order of Kutuzov. Specialised 'peacekeeping' unit. Address: 443539, Samara distr, Roschinskyy. Formed from 589th Separate Motor Rifle Regiment on February 1, 2005. In turn, the 589 Guards MRR was formed in late 1991 from the amalgamation of the 27 GMRD's 243 GMRR with the 213th Motor Rifle Division's 691st MRR. 2005: 100% contract service. 04.2008 visited by Japanese defence minister. 08.2008 one unit took part in war in South Ossetia.
  - 21st Separate Guards Omsk-Novy Bug Motor Rifle Brigade, in Totskoye equipped with BMP
  - 23rd Separate Guards Petrokov Motor Rifle Brigade, in Kryazh equipped with BTR
  - 28th Separate Simferopol Motor Rifle Brigade, in Yekaterinburg equipped with BMP
  - 201st Gatchina Military Base in Dushanbe (Tajikistan)
  - 3rd Guards Warsaw-Berlin Spetsnaz Brigade, in Roshchinsky, Samara Oblast
  - 473rd District Training Center, in Yelansky (just west of Kamyshlov in Sverdlovsk Oblast)

31st Guards Separate Airborne Brigade, in Ulyanovsk (under command of the Russian Airborne Troops (VDV) Command in Moscow)

- Missile and Artillery formations:
  - 92nd Missile Brigade, in Kamenka
  - 119th Missile Brigade, in Elanskyy
  - 385th Guards Artillery Brigade "Odessa", in Bershet
  - 950th MLRS Regiment, in Buzuluk
  - Artillery Reserve Base, in Buzuluk
  - 581st Independent Artillery Reconnaissance Battalion
- Air-defence formations:
  - 297th Air-defence Missile Brigade, in Alkino-2 (Ufa) equipped with the Buk missile system
- Radar formations:
  - 40th Independent Radio Technical Brigade, in Marks
  - 173rd Independent Radio Technical Battalion, in Samara
- Engineering formations:
  - 56th Engineer Regiment, in Alkino
  - 774th Independent Engineer Battalion, in Chebarkul
  - 7025th Engineer Reserve Base
- NBC-defence formations:
  - 29th Independent NBC-defence Brigade, in Yekaterinburg
  - 319th Independent NBC-defence Battalion, in Chpayevsk
- Signal formations:
  - 59th (Communications Hub) Signal Brigade "Sivashskaya", in Yekaterinburg
  - 179th (Territorial) Signal Brigade
  - 191st Independent Signal Regiment, in Samara
  - 153rd Independent (Rear) Signal Battalion
  - 836th Independent Signal Battalion
  - 1583rd Independent Electronic Warfare Battalion

Today the District comprises the Republic of Bashkortostan, the Republic of Mari El, the Republic of Mordovia, the Republic of Tatarstan, the Udmurt Republic, the Chuvash Republic, Kirov, Kurgan, Orenburg, Penza, Perm, Samara, Sverdlovsk, Tyumen, Ulyanovsk, and Chelyabinsk Oblasts, and the Komi-Permyak, Khanty-Mansiysk, and Yamalo-Nenets Autonomous Okrugs.

In 2009, on the basis of the 295th Guards Motorized Rifle Regiment, the 7th Independent Guards Tank Brigade was created. It was reported that the District was dissolved on September 1, 2010, with most of its area of responsibility combined with the Siberian Military District as part of the new Central Operational-Strategic Command, while its western part joined the Southern Operational-Strategic Command (formerly the North Caucasus Military District).

== Commanders ==
=== Ural Military District ===
==== 1918–1922 ====
- 1918 - 1918 : Filipp Goloshchyokin,
- 1918 - 1919 : Anuchin, Sergei Andreevich,
- 1919 - 1920 : Semashko, Adam Yakovlevich,
- 1920 - 1921 : Dukat, Julius Ivanovich,
- 1921 - 1922 : Sergei Mrachkovsky.

==== 1935–1989 ====
- May 1935 - May 1937 : Corps Commander Ilya Garkavyi,
- May 1937 - May 1937 : Corps Commander Boris Gorbachyov,
- May 1937 - Aug 1937 : Corps Commander Yan Gaylit,
- Aug 1937 - Jul 1938 : Corps Commander Georgy Sofronov,
- Jul 1938 - Jun 1941 : Corps Commander, from June 1940 Lieutenant General Filipp Yershakov,
- Jun 1941 - Nov 1941 : Colonel Ilya Alexandrovich Zhernakov (interim),
- Nov 1941 - Feb 1945 : Lieutenant General Alexander Vasilievich Katkov,
- Feb 1945 - Feb 1948 : Colonel General Fyodor Kuznetsov,
- Feb 1948 - Mar 1953 : Marshal of the Soviet Union Georgy Zhukov,
- May 1953 - Jan 1956 : General of the Army Mikhail Kazakov,
- Jan 1956 - Nov 1957 : General of the Army Nikolai Krylov,
- Jan 1958 - Jun 1960 : General of the Army Dmitry Lelyushenko,
- Jun 1960 - Jul 1961 : Colonel General Yakov Kreizer,
- Jul 1961 - Sep 1965 : Colonel General Ivan Tutarinov,
- Oct 1965 - Apr 1970 : Colonel General Alexander Alexandrovich Egorovsky,
- May 1970 - May 1980 : Colonel General Nikolai Kuzmich Silchenko,
- May 1980 - Dec 1983 : Colonel General Mikhail Alexandrovich Tyagunov,
- Dec 1983 - Nov 1984 : Colonel General Ivan Andreevich Gashkov,
- Nov 1984 - Jul 1987 : Colonel General Nikolai Fedorovich Grachev,
- Jul 1987 - Jan 1989 : Colonel General Nikolai Grigorievich Madudov,
- Jan 1989 - Sep 1989 : Colonel General Albert Makashov

==== 1992–2001 ====
- Jul 1992 - Dec 1999 : Colonel-General Yury Pavlovich Grekov,
- Dec 1999 - Jan 2000 : Colonel General Vyacheslav Valentinovich Tikhomirov,
- Mar 2000 - Jul 2001 : Colonel General Alexander Ivanovich Baranov.

=== Volga Military District ===
see : Volga Military District

=== Volga–Ural Military District Commanders ===
The following officers commanded the district during its existence:

==== 1989–1992 ====
- Colonel General Albert Makashov (1 September 1989 – 31 August 1991)
- Colonel General Anatoly Sergeyev (31 August 1991 – 7 July 1992)

==== 2001–2010 ====
- Colonel General (General of the Army from June 2004) Alexander Baranov (19 July 2001 – 19 July 2004)
- General of the Army Vladimir Boldyrev (19 July 2004 – 1 August 2008)
- Lieutenant General (promoted to Colonel General June 2010) Arkady Bakhin (3 December 2008 – 22 July 2010)
