= 213th Division =

213th Division may refer to:

- 213th Security Division, Wehrmacht, Germany
- 213th Coastal Division, Italy
- 213th Motor Rifle Division, Soviet Union
- 213th Rifle Division, Soviet Union

== See also ==
- List of military divisions by number
- 213th Brigade (disambiguation)
- 213th Regiment (disambiguation)
