= 442nd Rocket Brigade =

- Active: 1987-1991
- Country: Soviet Union
- Branch: Soviet Army
- Type: Tactical ballistic missile brigade
- Garrison/HQ: Shuya (1990-1991)

The 442nd Rocket Brigade was a Tactical ballistic missile brigade of the Soviet Army from 1987 to 1991. It was originally formed and based in Czechoslovakia with the Central Group of Forces but moved to Shuya, Ivanovo Oblast in 1990. The brigade was disbanded in 1991.

== History ==
The 442nd Missile Brigade was formed in September 1987 in Hvězdov (part of Ralsko), part of the Central Group of Forces. The brigade included the 404th, 440th and 535th Separate Missile Battalions, as well as a technical battery. The 404th had been transferred to the brigade from the 30th Guards Motor Rifle Division, the 440th from the 48th Motor Rifle Division and the 535th from the 15th Guards Tank Division. The brigade was equipped with the OTR-21 Tochka tactical ballistic missile. In May 1990, the brigade withdrew from Czechoslovakia to Shuya and became part of the Moscow Military District. It was disbanded in 1991.
