= 28th Army (Soviet Union) =

Soviet Army formation

- 28-я армия
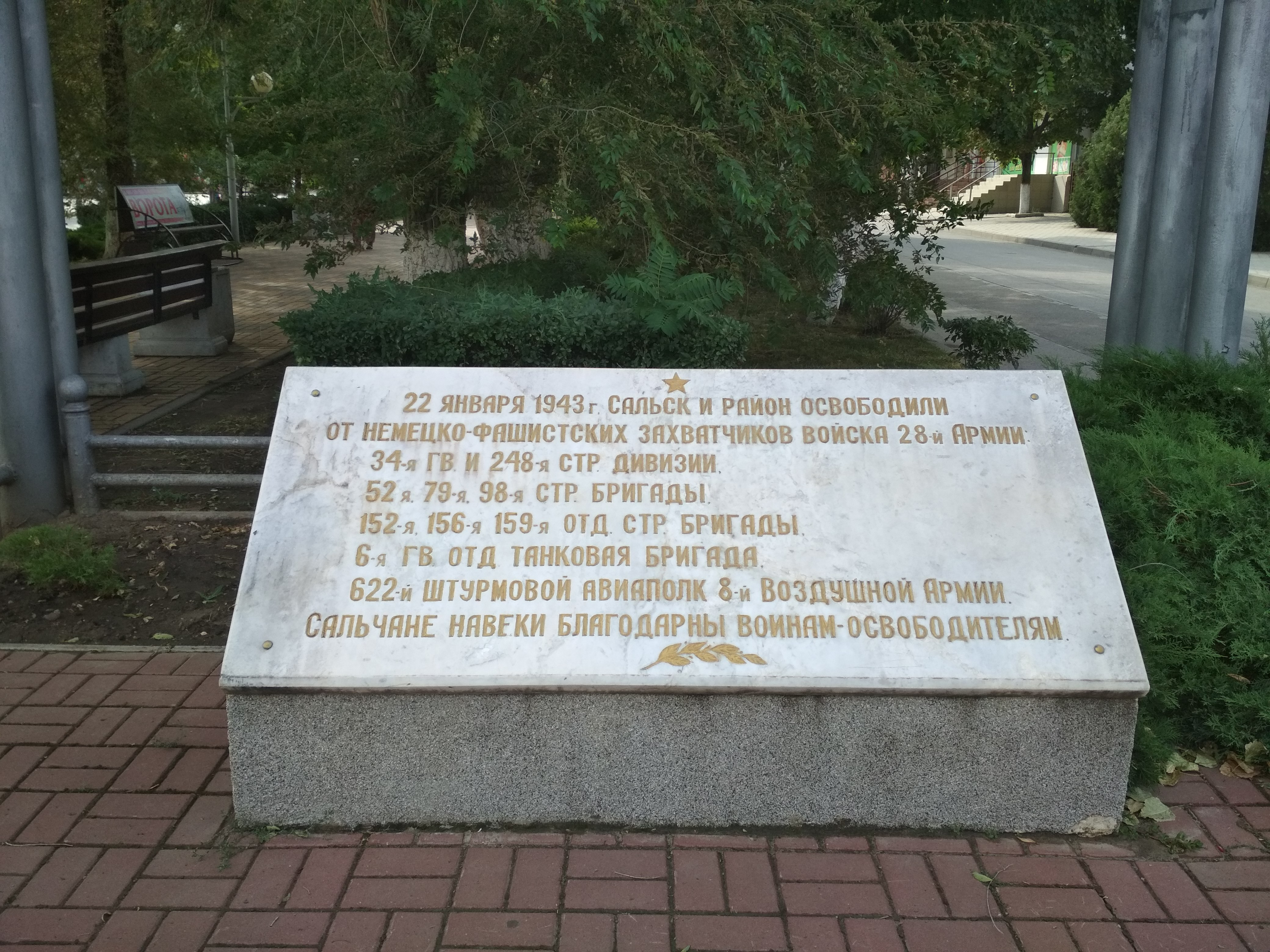
- Memorial stone to the 248th Rifle Division near Divnoe (Дивное) Stavropol Krai
- Active: June – 10 August 1941; September 1942 – 1993
- Country: Soviet Union
- Branch: Red Army / Soviet Army
- Type: Combined arms
- Size: Field Army; Several corps
- Engagements: World War II; Eastern Front; Donbas strategic offensive (July 1943); Donbas strategic offensive (August 1943); Melitopol Offensive; Battle of Smolensk; Second Battle of Kharkov; Battle of Stalingrad; Prague Offensive; Dnieper–Carpathian offensive; Nikopol–Krivoi Rog offensive; Bereznegovatoye–Snigirevka offensive; Operation Bagration; Bobruysk offensive; Minsk offensive; Lublin–Brest offensive; Gumbinnen Operation; East Prussian offensive; Insterburg-Konigsberg operation; Battle of Berlin; Prague offensive; Warsaw Pact invasion of Czechoslovakia

Commanders
- Notable commanders: Lieutenant-General Vladimir Kachalov

The 28th Army (Russian: 28-я армия) was a field army of the Red Army and the Soviet Ground Forces, formed three times in 1941–42 and active during the postwar period for many years in the Belorussian Military District.

== Initial formation ==
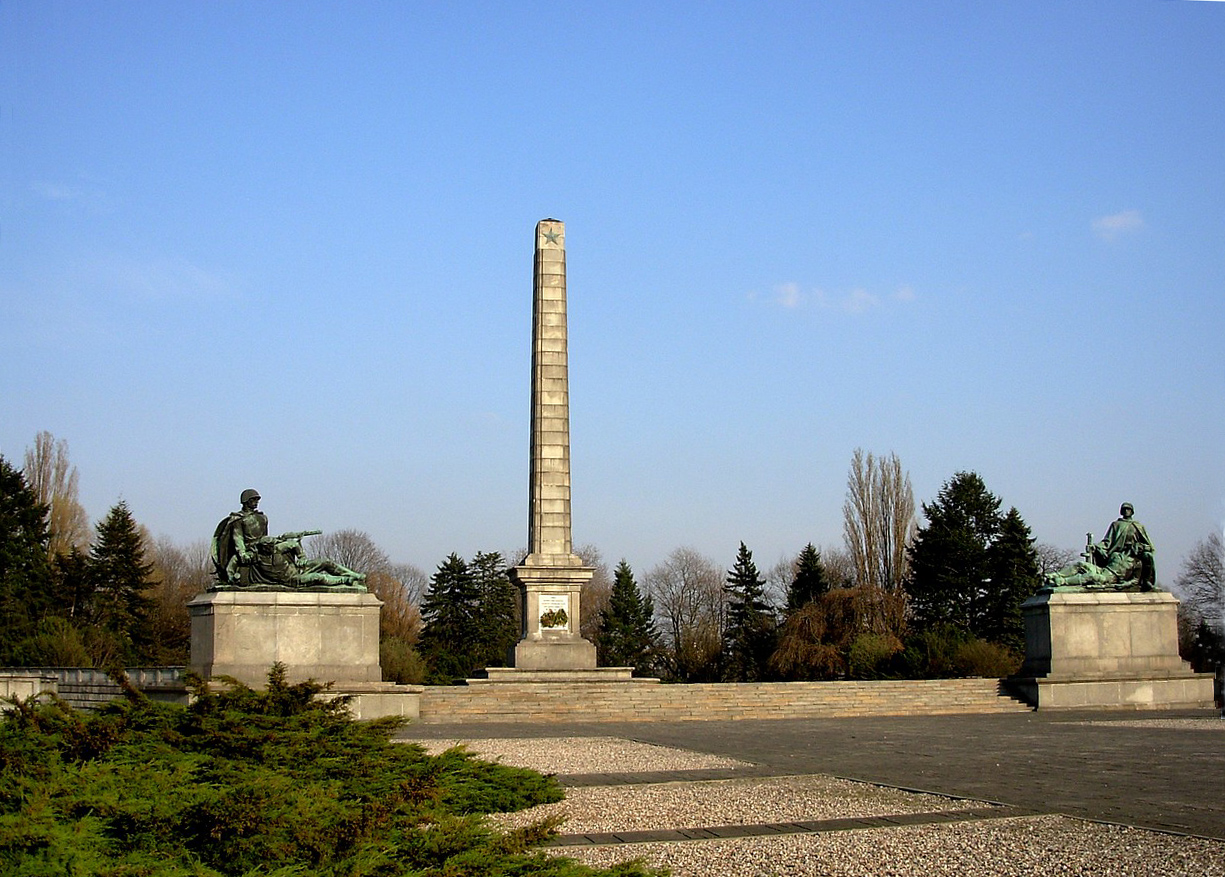
War Memorial Cemetery in Warsaw, where soldiers of the 28th Army are buried

The army was first formed in June 1941 from the Arkhangelsk Military District. It included the 30th and 33rd Rifle Corps, 69th Motorised Division, artillery, and other units.

The Army Commander was Lieutenant General Vladimir Kachalov (previously commander of the Arkhangelsk Military District). Members of the army's Military Council were Brigade Commissioner Vasily T. Kolesnikov, and Army Chief of Staff Major General Pavel G. Egorov.

On 14 July 1941, the order creating the Reserve Front gave the 28th Army's composition as nine divisions, one gun, one howitzer, and four corps artillery regiments, and four anti-tank artillery regiments.

It participated in the Battle of Smolensk. On 23 July, the 145th and 149th Rifle and 104th Tank Divisions launched a counterattack on the Wehrmacht troops from the Roslavl region in the direction of Pochinok and Smolensk. On 3 August, the army was completely encircled. During the breakout from the encirclement, the army suffered heavy losses and temporarily lost communication with headquarters. Kachalov was declared a traitor per Order № 270 and was sentenced to death in absentia. It was only after Stalin's death, based on the circumstances his death in battle on 4 August 1941, which were established after the war, that on 23 December 1953, the Military Collegium of the Supreme Court of the USSR overturned the sentence and Kachalov was fully rehabilitated.

Army command was disbanded on 10 August. The units that broke out of encirclement were used to form the Reserve Front, along with units from other armies.

== Second formation ==
The army was reformed on 15 November 1941 in the Moscow Military District. It included the 359th, 363rd, 367th and 375th Rifle Divisions and other units. From December 1941 to April 1942, the army was in the Stavka reserve, and was then transferred to the Southwestern Front. In May-July, it took part in the unsuccessful Second Battle of Kharkov and fought fierce defensive battles with superior Wehrmacht forces on the Oskil in the Valuyki area and in the large bend of the Don.

By 17 July 1942, the 28th Army had a strength of about 1,500 men, among whom the majority were rear service personnel, of which 117 people were in the army headquarters, 352 people in the 175th Rifle Division, 786 people in the 169th Rifle Division, 325 people in the 15th Guards Rifle Division, and 21 people in the 17th Fighter Brigade.

On 22 July 1942, the army was renamed the 4th Tank Army, and the rear was transferred to the 21st Army.

== Third formation ==
The third formation began on 5 September 1942 in Oral, from forces assigned to the Stalingrad Military District and Southeastern Front, and was tasked with defending the port city of Astrakhan on the Caspian Sea's northern coast, as well as the lower reaches of the Volga. The army was under the command of Lt. Gen. Vasyl Herasymenko, with Corps Commissar A.N. Melnikov and chief of staff Mjr. Gen. S.M. Rogachevsky making up the rest of the army's Military Council. On its formation it was under the direct command of the Stavka, but on 30 September it was subordinated to Stalingrad Front. On 19 November, just before Operation Uranus began south of Stalingrad, the army was comprised as follows:

- 34th Guards Rifle Division
- 248th Rifle Division
- 52nd, 152nd and 159th Rifle Brigades
- 78th and 116th Fortified Regions
- A separate cavalry regiment (or battalion)
- 6th Guards Tank Brigade
- 565th Separate Tank Battalion
- 35th Separate Armored Car Battalion
- 30th, 33rd and 46th Separate Armored Train Battalions

By 19 November, the army's strength was 64,265 men, with 47,891 men assigned to its combat forces. It fielded 1,196 guns and mortars and 80 tanks (10 heavy, 26 medium and 44 light).

In December, the 28th Army began an offensive operation in the direction of Elista, Salsk, and Rostov-on-Don; it liberated Elista on 31 December, Salsk on 22 January 1943, and Rostov-on-Don on 14 February (with the 5th Shock Army). On 20 February, the army's units reached the Mius, where they went on the defensive.

In August-October 1943, the army, as part of the troops of the 4th Ukrainian Front, participated in the Donbas and Melitopol offensive operations, as a result of which the Donbas was liberated and Soviet troops reached the lower reaches of the Dnieper and the Isthmus of Perekop and captured a bridgehead on the southern shore of the Syvash.

In February 1944, the army participated in the Nikopol–Krivoi Rog offensive, and in March (as part of the 3rd Ukrainian Front) in the Bereznegovatoye–Snigirevka offensive, during which its troops, in cooperation with other armies, liberated many settlements in the south of Southern Ukraine, including the cities of Kherson and Mykolaiv.

At the end of March, the army was withdrawn to the Stavka reserve and then redeployed to the central sector of the Eastern Front, where in June-July 1944, as part of the 1st Belorussian Front, it defeated Wehrmacht troops in Operation Bagration and the Bobruysk offensive. Despite the forested and marshy terrain, the army successfully broke through the German defenses in the Parichi direction and, fighting for a month, advanced 400 km. Having crossed the Bug near Brest, the army pursued the Wehrmacht into Poland in the Lublin–Brest offensive.

On 1 July 1944 the army comprised the

- 3rd Guards Rifle Corps (50th, 54th and 96th Guards Rifle Divisions),
- 20th Rifle Corps (48th and 55th Guards Rifle Divisions, 20th Rifle Division),
- 128th Rifle Corps (61st, 130th, and 152nd Rifle Divisions)
- artillery units including the 3rd Corps Artillery Brigade, 157th Cannon Artillery Brigade, 377th Cannon Artillery Regiment, 530th Fighter Anti-Tank Artillery Regiment, 1st Mortar Brigade (from the 5th Breakthrough Artillery Division), 133rd and 316th Guards Mortar Regiments, 12th Anti-Aircraft Artillery Division (836th, 977th, 990th, 997th Anti-Aircraft Artillery Regiments), 607th Anti-Aircraft Artillery Regiment (зенап),
- tank forces, engineers, and other troops.

In mid-October 1944, the army was transferred to the 3rd Belorussian Front and participated in the Gumbinnen Operation. Brought into battle from the 2nd echelon of the front, it broke through German fortifications and captured the city of Stallupönen on 25 October.

In January-April 1945, the army participated in the East Prussian offensive, during which it broke through a heavily fortified German defense and reached the center of East Prussia. Later, continuing the offensive, the army, in cooperation as part of the 3rd Belorussian Front, captured the Baltic Sea coast southwest of Königsberg, thereby cutting off the escape routes of the German East Prussian group.

After eliminating the German group encircled in the Königsberg region, the army was transferred to the 1st Ukrainian Front in April 1945 and participated in the Battle of Berlin. Brought into battle from the 2nd echelon of the front, the army's main forces fought fiercely encircle and eliminate the Wehrmacht's Frankfurt-Guben group, and part of its forces, together with the 3rd Guards Tank Army, carried out the assault on Berlin.

The army ended its combat operations in Czechoslovakia, participating in the Prague offensive. In cooperation with the 52nd Army, it successfully launched a strike from the Niesky region in the direction of Zittau and Česká Lípa and reached northeastern approach to Prague, where it accepted the capitulation a large encircled group of Wehrmacht troops. Tens of thousands of army soldiers were awarded medals and orders for courage, heroism, and military skill. A number of the army's units and formations were awarded government awards and honorary titles.

=== Post-war ===
In September 1945, the 28th Army redeployed to the Baranovichi Military District in the Byelorussian SSR. From 1945 to 1947, the number of rifle units was reduced, while their qualitative composition was strengthened.

In September 1954, the 12th Guards Mozyr Mechanised Division and the 50th Guards Stalino Rifle Division, as part of the 128th Gumbinnen Rifle Corps, were used to form the test units utilised at Totskoye range during the test of a 40-kiloton nuclear bomb.

In 1957, the rifle corps commands were abolished, and rifle divisions were reorganized into motorized rifle divisions, while mechanized divisions were reorganized into tank divisions:

- The 8th Mechanized Division was reorganized into the 28th Tank Division (Slonim);
- The 12th Guards Mechanized Division was reorganized into the 33rd (became the 15th in 1965) Guards Tank Division (Brest).

In August 1968, the 15th Guards Tank and the 30th Guards Motor Rifle Division of the 28th Army were deployed to Czechoslovakia to participate in Operation Danube, where they remained as part of the Central Group of Forces. To replace these divisions, the 76th Tank Division was formed in Brest and the 84th Motor Rifle Division in Grodno as mobilization divisions. On 15 January 1974, the army was awarded the Order of the Red Banner. The 6th Guards Kiev-Berlin Tank Division was transferred to Grodno in March 1980 from East Germany. To make room for the 6th Division, the 84th Motor Rifle Division was moved to the 7th Tank Army. During the 1980s, the army was composed of the 6th Guards, 28th and 76th Tank Divisions and the 50th Guards Motor Rifle Division. During the late 1980s, the 28th Tank Division was disbanded and the 76th Tank Division was reorganized as the 5356th Weapons and Equipment Storage Base.

=== Belarus ===
With the formation of an independent Belarus, the Armed Forces of Belarus were created on the basis of the forces of the Belarusian Military District. On the dissolution of the Soviet Union, the 28th Army, headquartered at Grodno, included the 6th Guards Tank Division (Grodno), 6314th Weapons and Equipment Storage Base (Slonim), 50th Guards Motor Rifle Division (Brest), and the 5356th Weapons and Equipment Storage Base, also at Brest.

In 1993 the army redesignated the 28th Army Corps. The corps was redesignated the Western Operational Command in 2001.

== Commanders ==
- Vladimir Kachalov (June–August 1941), killed in action
- Ivan Tyulenev (November 1941 – March 1942)
- Dmitry Ryabyshev (March – July 1942)
- Vasily Kryuchenkin (July 1942)
- Vasyl Herasymenko (September 1942 – November 1943)
- Aleksei Grechkin (November 1943 – May 1944)
- Alexander Luchinsky (May 1944 – February 1946)
- Franz Perkhorovich (February – May 1946)
- Pyotr Shafranov (May 1946 – 1947)
- Nikolai Gusev (1947–1949)
- Ivan Chistyakov (1949–1953)
- Andrey Matveyevich Andreyev (1954–1957)
- Alexander Yakushov (1957–1960)
- Mikhail Fomichyov (1960–1962)
- Mikhail Frolenkov (1962–1967)
- Grigory Salmanov (1967–1969)
- Nikolay Abashin (1969–1973)
- Valentin Krapivin (1973–1974)
- Sergey Varichenko (1974–1976)
- Grigory Armenopolov (1976–1978)
- Ivan Volokhonsky (1978–1979)
- Vladimir Lobov (1979–1981)
- Yury Gusev (1981–1984)
- Mikhail Kalinin (1984–1986)
- Boris Gromov (1986–1987)
- Sergey Seleznyov (1987–1989)
- Pavel Kozlovsky (1989–1991)
- Vladimir Chilindin (1991–1992)
