= Volga Military District =

- Boundaries of the Volga Military District (in red) on 1 January 1989
- Active: 1918–1989; 1992–2001
- Country: Soviet Union
- Type: Military district
- Part of: Soviet Armed Forces
- Garrison/HQ: Kuybyshev/Samara
- Decorations: Order of the Red Banner

Commanders
- Notable commanders: Pavel Dybenko; Mikhail Khozin; Vasily Kuznetsov; Nikolai Ogarkov

The Volga Military District (PriVO) was a military district of the Soviet Union and the Russian Federation that existed from 1918 to 1989 and 1992 to 2001.

The district headquarters was located at Kazan, Saratov and Kuibyshev (Samara) at different points in time.

== History ==
During the Russian Empire from 1864–1917 the Kazan Military District covered the Volga area. The Volga Military District was established on May 4, 1918 on the territory of the Kazan Military District, and included Astrakhan, Saratov, Samara, Simbirsk and Penza Governorates, and the Ural Oblast. Subsequently, the district boundaries were repeatedly changed. In 1941 the district included the Saratov, Kuibyshev, Penza, Tambov, Voronezh areas and the Orel Oblast, Kursk and Stalingrad regions of the RSFSR. The headquarters was located at Saratov.

With the start of and during World War II five armies, 132 divisions, 65 separate regiments, and 253 separate battalions were formed in the area. Polish and Czechoslovak military units were formed on the territory of the district.

In October 1945 the 123rd Rifle Corps was at Kuibyshev. It became the 40th Rifle Corps in 1955 and then the 40th Army Corps in 1957, before disbanding in 1960.

On September 14, 1954 in the Totskoye range north of the village Totskoye in the Orenburg Oblast (within the specified period the territory of the Orenburg region belonged to the South Urals Military District) under the leadership of Marshal of the Soviet Union Georgy Zhukov was conducted the Totskoye nuclear exercise with real nuclear weapons. In this doctrine, which were worked out operational issues combined arms attack, was attended by about 45,000 soldiers.

From 1957 to 1960 the 110th Motor Rifle Division was part of the 40th Army Corps of the District.

By a decree of the Presidium of the Supreme Soviet on 15 January 1974 for their contributions to strengthening the defence capability of the USSR and its armed defence, the Volga and Ural Military Districts were awarded the Order of the Red Banner. By 1983, the Volga Military District included the territory of the Kuibyshev, Saratov, Ulyanovsk, Penza and Orenburg Oblasts, Tatar, Bashkir, Chuvash, Mari, and Mordovian ASSR. The district headquarters was located in Kuibyshev.

=== Formations and units in the late 1980s ===
The following military units and formations were part of the district during the late 1980s.

- Office of the commander (military unit 22223) (Kuibyshev);
- Headquarters (military unit 73428) (Kuibyshev);
- 370th separate battalion of protection and support (Kuibyshev);
- 43rd Training Motor Rifle Division (Reorganized into the 469th District Training Center) (Kuibyshev)
- 213th Motor Rifle Division (Totskoye)
- 96th Motor Rifle Division (5509th BKhVT) (Mobilization) (Kazan)
- 130th Motor Rifle Division (Mobilization) (Kuibyshev)
- 238th Rear Defence Division (Mobilization) (Kuibyshev)
- 249th Reserve Motor Rifle Division (Mobilization) (Yoshkar-Ola)
- 256th Reserve Motor Rifle Division (Mobilization) (Kuibyshev)
- 274th Reserve Motor Rifle Division (Mobilization) (Kryazh)
- 73rd Reserve Tank Division (Mobilization) (Kazan)
- 74th Reserve Tank Division (Mobilization) (Ulyanovsk)
- 112th Anti-Aircraft Artillery Division (Mobilization) (Donguz)
- 808th separate company of special forces (Kuibyshev);
- 71st communications center (Kuibyshev);
- 237th separate helicopter squadron (Kuibyshev);
- 151st anti-aircraft missile brigade (Kuibyshev);
- 49th separate communications brigade (Kuibyshev);
- 28th anti-aircraft missile brigade (village Donguz);
- 1st brigade of chemical protection (n. Shikhany);
- 23rd aerosol countermeasures brigade (Chapaevsk-11);
- 112th material support brigade (settlement Roshinsky);
- 39th Radio Engineering Brigade OSNAZ (Orenburg);
- 315th Separate Radio Engineering Regiment OsNaz (Saratov);
- 950th Reactive Artillery Regiment (Buzuluk);
- 1113th anti-tank artillery regiment (Buzuluk);
- 991st reconnaissance artillery regiment (Engels);
- 73rd separate communications regiment (Kuibyshev);
- 191st separate rear communications regiment (Kuibyshev);
- 1413th Anti-Aircraft Artillery Regiment (Buzuluk)
- 14th reconnaissance and serif regiment (Volsk);
- 426th separate engineer-sapper battalion (Penza);
- 85th separate pontoon-bridge battalion (Penza);
- 754th separate chemical protection battalion (Penza);
- 1583rd separate EW battalion (Kuibyshev);
- 796th separate engineer-sapper battalion (village Totskoye);
- 173rd separate air defense radio engineering battalion (city Marks);
- 5512th repair and restoration base (settlement Kryazh);

In total, in 1990, in addition to about 90 thousand military personnel, there were still 400 tanks, 700 armored combat vehicles, 200 guns, mortars and MLRS, 200 combat and transport helicopters, including those under repair and storage.

The district's air forces included the Orenburg Higher Military Aviation School of Pilots and the Saratov Higher Military Aviation School of Pilots.

In 1989 the district was merged with the Ural Military District to become the Volga–Ural Military District (PURVO). It was split in 1992 and then the two districts were merged again in 2001.

== Commanders ==
- 1918–1919: Ivan Mezhlauk
- 1924–1927: Alexander Sedyakin
- 1931–1932: Boris Shaposhnikov
- 1932–1933: Ivan Fedko
- 1933–1937: Pavel Dybenko
- 1937: Marshal Mikhail Tukhachevsky
- 1937: Mikhail Grigoryevich Yefremov
- 1938–1939: Kirill Meretskov
- 1939-1940: Trifon Shevaldin
- 1940–1941: Vasyl Herasymenko
- 1941-1944: Stepan Kalinin
- 1944-1945: Mikhail Khozin
- 1945-1946: Vasily Gordov
- 1946-1950: Vasily Yushkevich
- 1953-1957: Vasily Kuznetsov
- 1957-1960: Vladimir N. Komarov
- 1960-1961: Andrei Stuchenko
- 1961-1963: Ivan G. Pavlovsky
- 1963-1965: Nikolai Lyashchenko
- 1965-1968: Nikolai Ogarkov
- 1968-1971: Aleksey M. Parshikov
- 1971-1975: Yuri A. Naumenko
- 1975-1977: Pyotr Lushev
- 1977-1981: Vladimir N. Conchis
- 1981-1985: Anatoly Y. Ryakhov
- 1985-1989: V. A. Patrikaev
- 1989-1991: Albert Makashov
- 1991-2001: Anatoly Sergeyev
