= Aleksandr Pryanikov =

Russian television personality

- Born: Aleksandr Alekseevich Pryanikov; November 19, 1969 (age 56); Orenburg, RSFSR, Soviet Union
- Citizenship: Moscow
- Occupations: showman, TV presenter, radio host
- Spouse: Aksinya Guryanova (divorce)
- Children: 2

Aleksandr Alekseevich Pryanikov (Russian: Алекса́ндр Алексе́евич Пря́ников; born November 19, 1969, Orenburg) is a Russian television and radio personality, showman. The winner of Ovation Award.

== Biography ==
He was born on November 19, 1969, in Orenburg. Mother Faina Yuryevna Pryanikova, pianist-accompanist; father Aleksei Ivanovich Pryanikov, teacher in the class of pipe. Both served in the Moscow Operetta Theater.

He studied in high school, as well as in a music school for piano, which he did not finish (he left after the third grade). After graduation he served in the army in the town of Kryazh near Samara, where he played in a military band on a drum, rose to the rank of junior sergeant.

In 1993 he graduated from the Gnessin State Musical College in the class of musical comedy. Next two years he spent in the USA.

He had been working on television since 1995. In that year, Aleksandr was selected for the Russian music TV channel Muz-TV, where he quickly became popular and almost became the face of the television channel. In 1998, being already a well-known presenter, he came to work for Russkoye Radio and soon became the program director of the radio station. In addition to working on radio and television, he was leading at major concerts, including events, including the Muz-TV Award.

Participates in advertising Tide.
