= Anatoly Sergeyev =

Russian military officer (1940–2025)

- Анатолий Ипатович Сергеев
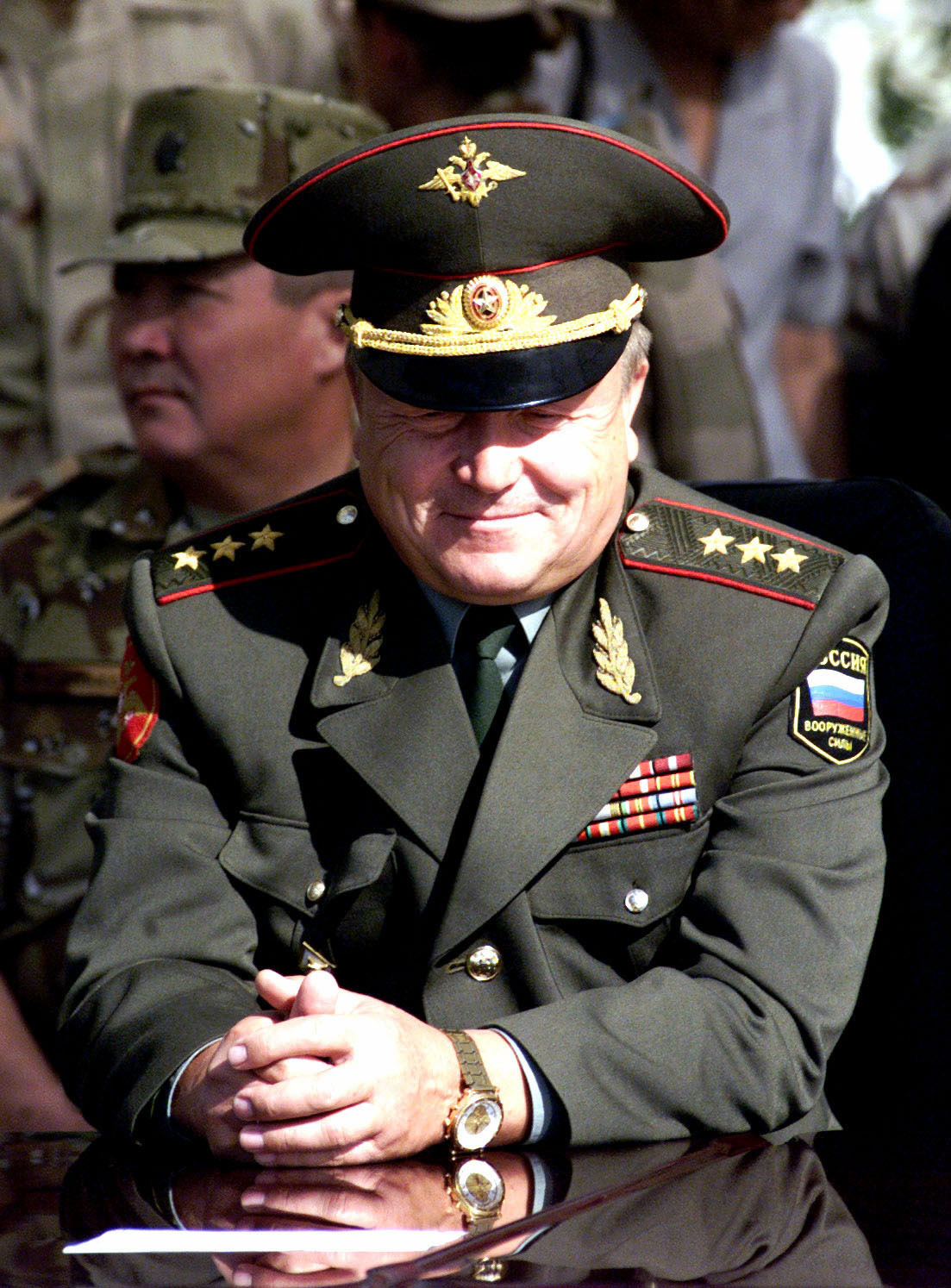
- Sergeyev in 2000
- Born: Anatoly Ipatovich Sergeyev; 6 November 1940; Ipatovka, Bolsherechensky District, Omsk Oblast, Russian SFSR, Soviet Union
- Died: 16 December 2025 (aged 85); Samara, Russia
- Military career
- Allegiance: Soviet Union; Russia
- Branch: Russian Ground Forces
- Service years: 1960–2002
- Rank: Colonel general
- Commands: 14th Guards Combined Arms Army: Volga–Ural Military District (1991‍–‍1992); Volga Military District(1992–2001)
- Conflict: Soviet-Afghan War

Anatoly Ipatovich Sergeyev (Russian: Анатолий Ипатович Сергеев; 6 November 1940 – 16 December 2025) was a Russian military officer who was commander of the Volga–Ural and the Volga Military Districts from 1991 to 2001. He reached the rank of colonel general in 1991.

== Life and career ==
Anatoly Sergeyev was born in the village of Ipatovka, Bolsherechensky District, Omsk Oblast, Russian SFSR, Soviet Union on 6 November 1940.

Sergeyev attended the Far Eastern Tank School in 1960 and graduated with honors in 1963. In 1970, he enrolled in the Military Academy of the Armored Forces named after Marshal of the Soviet Union R. Ya. Malinovsky, and graduated in 1973.

In 1980, Sergeyev entered the Military Academy of the General Staff of the Armed Forces named after K. E. Voroshilov, and graduated in 1982.

From February 1986 to June 1987, Sergeyev was commander of the 14th Guards Combined Arms Army in the Odessa Military District. From June 1987 to August 1991, he was the Chief of Staff of the Odessa Military District. From 1 September 1991, he was the Commander of the Volga-Ural Military District. On 7 July 1992, Sergeyev became the commander of the newly-formed Volga Military District until 24 March 2001 when it was abolished.

Sergeyev retired from the army in 2002, and became chairman of the Samara Regional Public Organization of the Committee of Veterans of War and Military Service. He died in Samara on 16 December 2025, at the age of 85.
