= 30th Rifle Division =

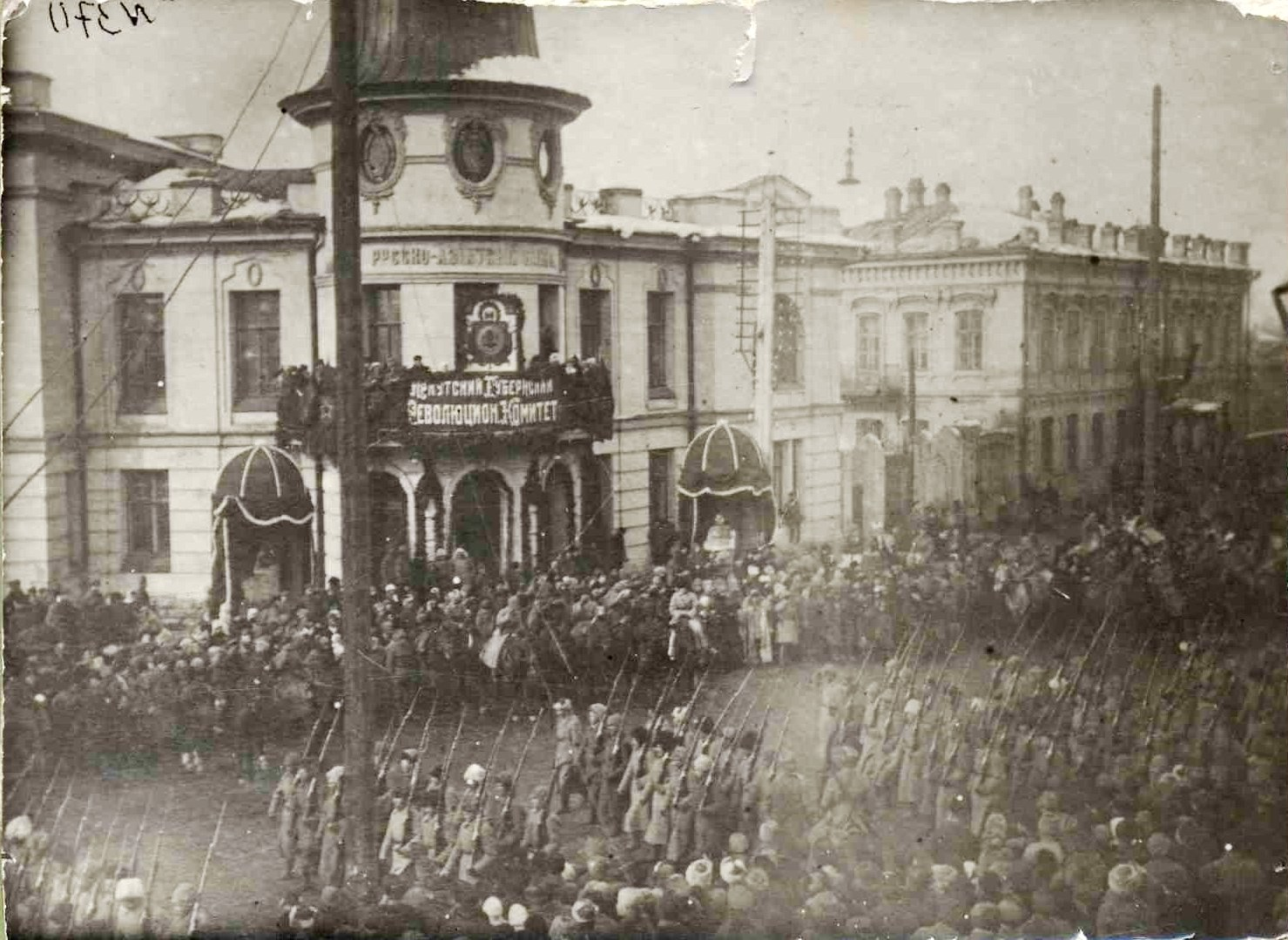
- The 30th Rifle Division entering Irkutsk on 7 March 1920
- Active: 1st Formation: October 1918–18 December 1942; 2nd Formation: 1943–1945; 3rd Formation: 1955–1957
- Country: Soviet Union
- Branch: Red Army
- Type: Infantry
- Size: Division
- Engagements: Russian Civil War; World War II
- Decorations: Order of Lenin (1st formation) Order of the Red Banner (2nd, and 3rd formations) (2; 1st formation) Order of Suvorov (3rd formation)
- Battle honours: Irkutsk (1st formation) Kiev (2nd formation); Zhitomir (2nd formation); Zaporizhia (3rd formation) Khingan (3rd formation)

Commanders
- Notable commanders: Vasily Blyukher

The 30th Rifle Division was an infantry division of the Soviet Union, formed three times. The final full name of its first formation was the 30th Rifle Irkutsk Order of Lenin, three Orders of the Red Banner, Order of the Red Banner of Labour Division of the name of the Supreme Soviet of the RSFSR. After being redesignated the 55th Guards Rifle Division in December 1942, the division was reformed in Rossosh in April 1943. The division was formed a third time in 1955.

== History ==
=== Russian Civil War ===
At the request of the Revolutionary Military Council of the 3rd Army, the 4th Ural Rifle Division was formed on 23 September 1918. In accordance with the Order to the Troops of the 3rd Army of the Eastern Front No. 038, dated 30 October 1918, the 3rd Ural Rifle Division was incorporated into the 4th Ural Rifle Division. By the Order to the Troops of the 3rd Army of the Eastern Front No. 048, dated 11 November 1918, the 4th Ural was renamed the 30th Rifle Division.

Two senior Soviet military leaders served with the division in its early years: Vasily Konstantinovich Blucher, later famous for his command in the Far East, commanded the division from 22 September 1918 to 15 January 1919; and Konstantin Rokossovsky, later Marshal of the Soviet Union, commanded one of the division's regiments in 1919–1920. In 1939, based on 30th Rifle Division units, the 132nd Rifle Division and 176th Rifle Division were created. Subsequently, the division was reformed as the 30th Mountain Rifle Division and began World War II under this name. The division was renamed the 30th Rifle Division on 25 August 1941.

The division distinguished itself in battles near the city of Kungur, when it held an all round defence for seven days, holding back the superior troops of General Radola Gajda in the Perm Operation.

=== World War II ===
The division was part of the 'operational army' from 22 June 1941 to 18 December 1942.

On 22 June 1941, the division was stationed at the Soviet-Romanian border on the river Prut at Sculeni (Calarasi, Frontier District Number 5). The division was part of the 35th Rifle Corps of the 9th Army. On 24 June 1941 the division had entered the battle and was forced to retreat on 30 June 1941. The division held the line of Vnishora, German, and Petreshtipri. During the disorganized retreat the division lost much equipment and personnel. On 5 July the division held positions at the front from Popovka to Lipovanka. On 7 July 1941 the division was in reserve. Up to 11 July, the division numbered no more than one regiment.

On 6 August 1941, the division was transferred to the Separate Coastal Army, which was entrusted with the defense of Odessa, but before managing to link up with the army's main force, the division was cut off and was forced to withdraw to the Southern Bug River. It then fought in defensive and offensive battles on the Rostov axis, holding the line on the river Mius. In January 1942, the division crossed the Mius and in March 1942, it participated in the offensive on Taganrog. From the second half of July 1942, the division conducted a fighting retreat toward the Caucasus. On 25 July, after covering the crossing of the Don in the Azov area for three days, the division defended positions in the area of Krasnodar. On 12 August, the division was forced to retreat from Krasnodar. In August, the division held the defence near Goryachy Klyuch.

The division fought in the Tuapse Defensive Operation. By 20 August 1942, the division covered the road through the Pyatigorsk and Khrebtovy passes. After a lull in the fighting that lasted until 23 September, the division was again involved in heavy defensive fighting. By the end of October, the 30th Rifle Division held the line in the Kaverze River valley, covering the Khrebtovy Pass. On 12 December 1942 the division was transformed into the 55th Guards Rifle Division as a reward for its actions.

The second formation of the 30th Rifle Division was formed in Rossosh on 22 March 1943. It fought at Rostov, Kiev, Zhitomir, and in the Carpathian Mountains. It was with 38th Army of the 4th Ukrainian Front in May 1945. The division was disbanded with the Northern Group of Forces in the summer of 1945.

=== Postwar ===
In 1955 the division was reformed by redesignation of the 203rd Rifle Division at Karaganda, but then the division was disbanded by being redesignated as the 102nd Motor Rifle Division in 1957.

== Subordination ==
- Southern Front, 9th Army, 35th Rifle Corps – on 22 June 1941.
- Southern Front, Separate Coastal Army – on 6 August 1941,
- Southern Front, 9th Army – on 1 October 1941.
- Southern Front, 56th Army – from January 1942.
- Trans-Caucasian Front, the Black Sea Group of Forces, 56th Army – on 1 October 1942.

== Composition ==
30th Mountain Division

- 35th Mountain Rifle Regiment
- 71st Mountain Rifle Regiment
- 256th Mountain Rifle Regiment
- 369th Mountain Rifle Regiment
- 59th Artillery Regiment
- 121st Howitzer Artillery Regiment
- 147th Separate Antitank Battalion
- 89th Cavalry Squadron
- 101st Sapper Battalion
- 115th Separate Battalion
- 40th Division Artillery Park
- 57th Medical-Sanitary Battalion
- 66th Separate Company Chemical Protection
- 407th Trucking Company
- 80th Field Bakery
- 94th Second Division Veterinary Hospital
- 81st Field Postal Station
- ?th Field Ticket Office of the State Bank

30th Rifle Division

- 35th Rifle Regiment
- 71st Rifle Regiment
- 256th Rifle Regiment
- 59th Light Artillery Regiment
- 121st Howitzer Artillery Regiment (until 30 December 1941)
- 147th Separate Antitank Artillery Battalion (up to 19 January 1942)
- 436th Anti-Aircraft Battery (287th Separate Anti-Aircraft Artillery Battalion)
- 551st Mortar Division (from 27 November 1941 to 3 November 1942)
- 89th Separate Reconnaissance Battalion
- 101st Sapper Battalion
- 115th Separate Battalion
- 40th Divisional Artillery Park (until 6 April 1942)
- 57th Medical-Sanitary Battalion
- 66th Separate Company Chemical Protection
- 407th Trucking company
- 80th Field Bakery
- 94th Second Division Veterinary Hospital
- 81st Field Postal Station
- 1721st (341st) Field Ticket Office of the State Bank

In March 1942, the 13th Rifle Brigade temporarily became part of the division.

== Commanders ==
- Sergey Gavrilovich Galaktionov (16 August 1939 – 25 August 1941) brigade commander to 5 June 1940 major general (shot "for negligence and inaction")
- Mikhail D. Goncharov (25 August 1941 – 4 December 1941) major general
- Sawa Kalistratovich Potekhin (5 December 1941 – 14 June 1942) colonel
- Boris Nikitich Arshintsev (15 June 1942 – 18 December 1942) colonel

== Hero of the Soviet Union ==
- Senior Sergeant Gerasimos Evseyevich Kucheryavyi, Hero of the Soviet Union – Gunner 256th Rifle Regiment. Posthumously awarded the title 31 March 1943, for fighting in Goryachy Kluch on 11 November 1942. He was left alone to defend a high location and was surrounded by German soldiers. They offered to let him surrender. He allowed them to come close to him and detonated a grenade, killing four German soldiers.

== Awards ==
- 13 December 1920 – Received the name Irkutsk
- 16 July 1921 – Named after the Central Executive Committee
- December 1938 – Name changed to "Named for the Supreme Soviet of the RSFSR"
- ? – Honorary Revolutionary Red Banner
- 18 April 1920 – Order of the Red Banner
- 4 April 1921 – Order of Red Banner
- 8 May 1921 – Order of the Red Banner of the USSR
- 27 February 1934 – Order of Lenin
- 10 December 1942 – converted into a Guards unit

== Sources and bibliography ==
- Feskov, V.I.; Golikov, V.I.; Kalashnikov, K.A.; Slugin, S.A. (2013). Вооруженные силы СССР после Второй Мировой войны: от Красной Армии к Советской [The Armed Forces of the USSR after World War II: From the Red Army to the Soviet: Part 1 Land Forces] (in Russian). Tomsk: Scientific and Technical Literature Publishing. ISBN 9785895035306.
- Кудрявцев, Ф. А. Иркутская гвардейская. Kudryavtsev, FA Irkutsk Guards. – 2 ed. – Иркутск: 1944. – Irkutsk: 1944. – 39 с. – 39.
- Богданов, Л. Г. В пламени и славе . Bogdanov, LG in flames and glory . – 2 ed., Corr. and add. – Иркутск: Восточно-Сибирское книжное издательство, 1988. – Irkutsk: East Siberian Publishing House, 1988. – 381 pages
- GK Puzhaev Blood and glory Mius. Таганрог: БАННЭРплюс, 2008. Taganrog: BANNERplus, 2008. – 385 p.; ISBN 5-7280-0041-X
