= Zduchovice =

- Municipality
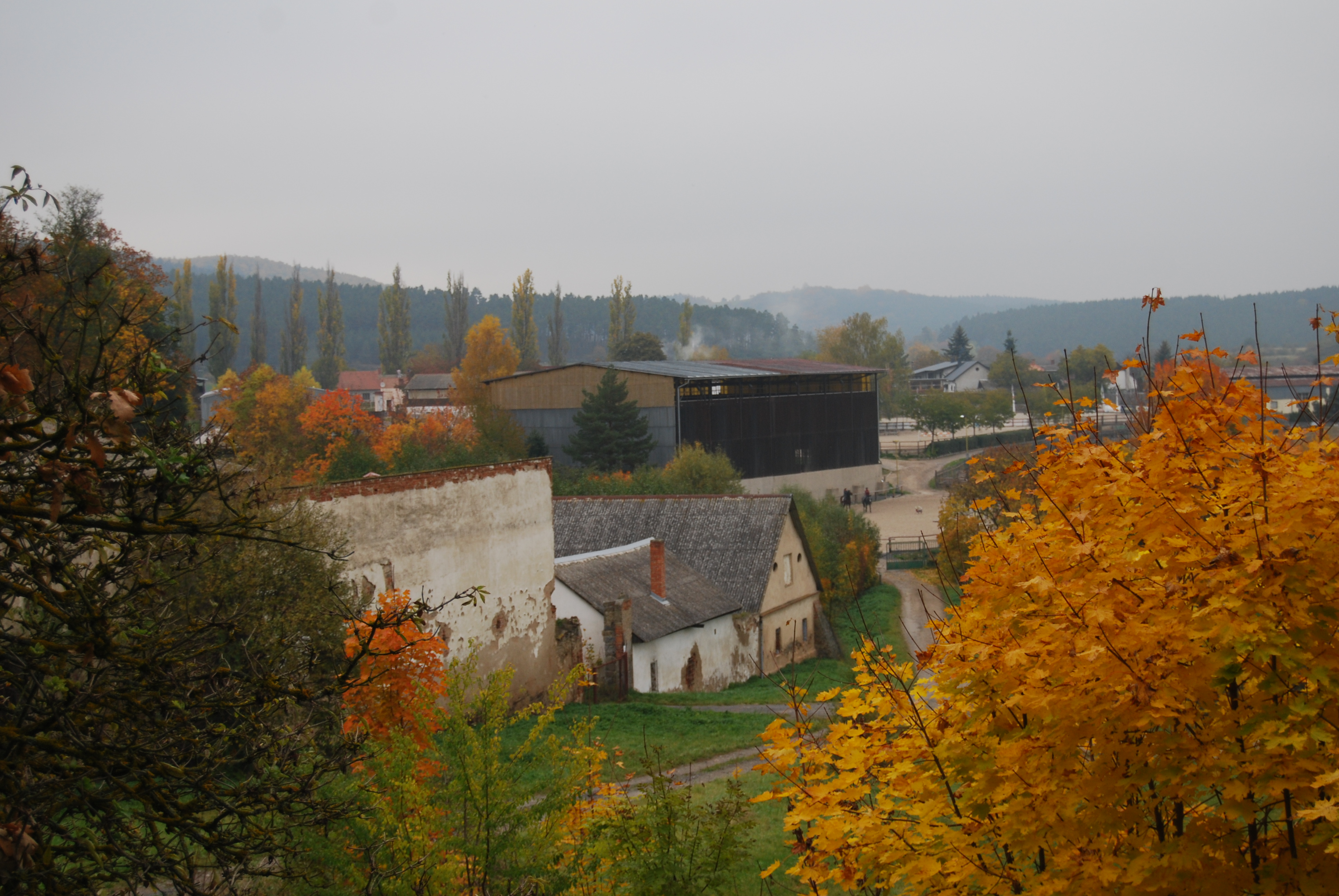
- Part of Zduchovice with the equestrian area

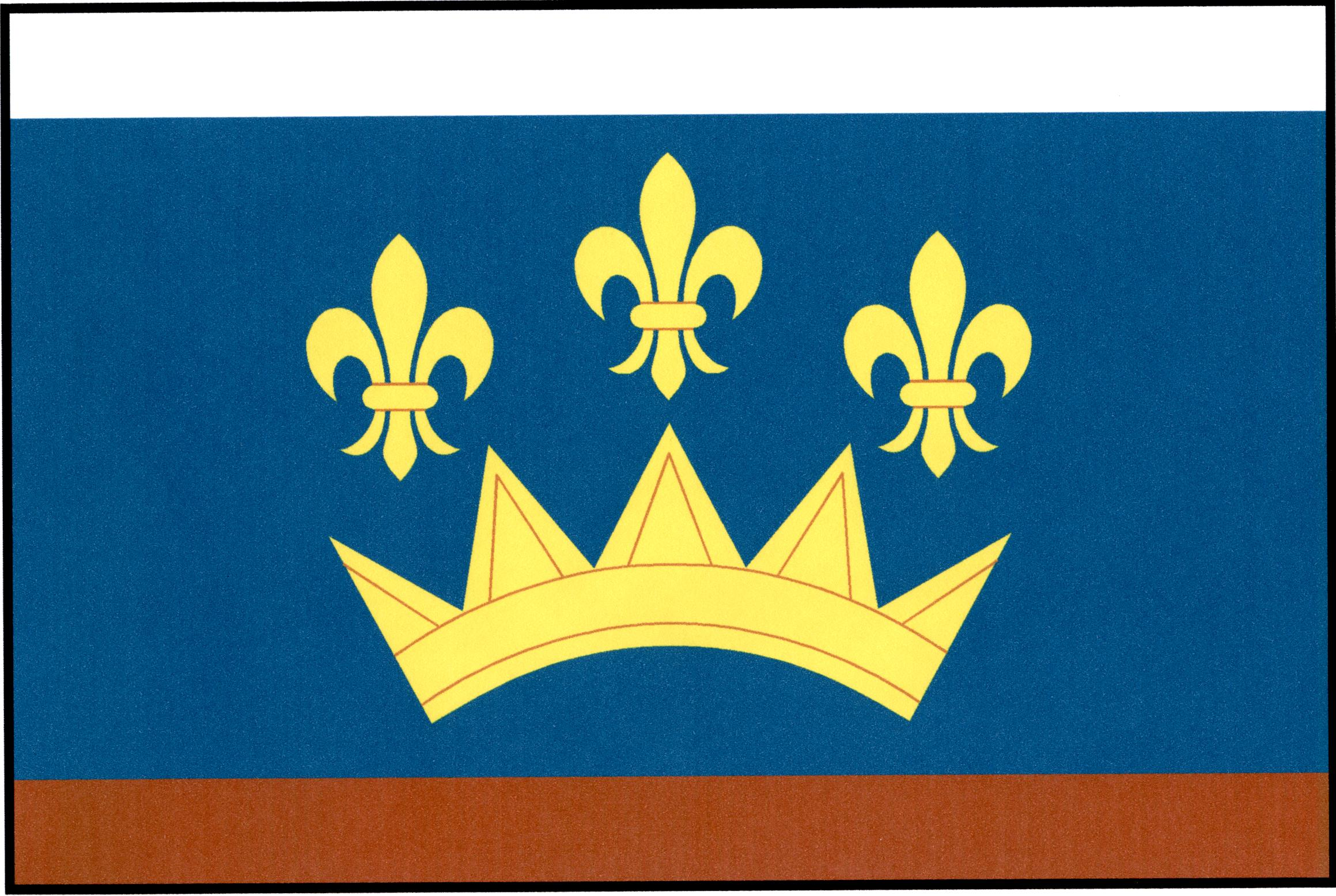
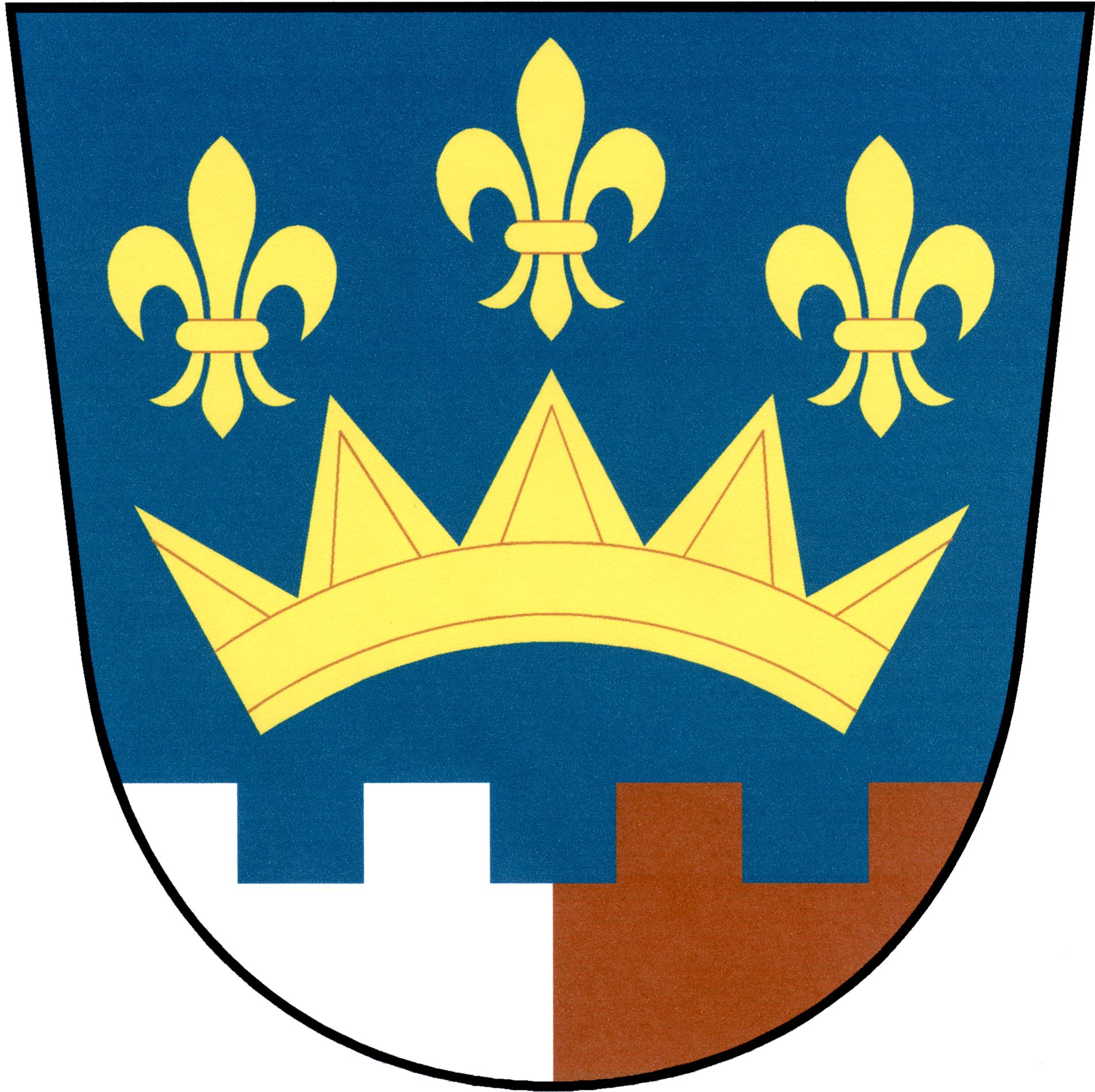
- Flag Coat of arms

- Location in the Czech Republic
- Coordinates: 49°38′19″N 14°12′32″E
- Country: Czech Republic
- Region: Central Bohemian
- District: Příbram
- First mentioned: 1045

Area
  - Total: 8.52 km^{2} (3.29 sq mi)
- Elevation: 407 m (1,335 ft)

Population (2026-01-01)
  - Total: 314
  - Density: 36.9/km^{2} (95.5/sq mi)
- Time zone: UTC+1 (CET)
  - Summer (DST): UTC+2 (CEST)
- Postal code: 262 63
- Website: www.obeczduchovice.cz

Zduchovice is a municipality and village in Příbram District in the Central Bohemian Region of the Czech Republic. It has about 300 inhabitants.

== Administrative division ==
Zduchovice consists of two municipal parts (in brackets population according to the 2021 census):

- Zduchovice (289)
- Žebrákov (34)

== History ==
The first written mention of Zduchovice is in a donation deed of Duke Bretislav I from 1045.

== Demographics ==
Historical population
Year	Pop.	±%
1869	586	—
1880	599	+2.2%
1890	672	+12.2%
1900	622	−7.4%
1910	580	−6.8%
1921	554	−4.5%
1930	542	−2.2%
1950	379	−30.1%
1961	332	−12.4%
1970	269	−19.0%
1980	289	+7.4%
1991	251	−13.1%
2001	265	+5.6%
2011	287	+8.3%
2021	323	+12.5%
Source: Censuses
