= 213th Motor Rifle Division =

Motor rifle division of the Soviet military

- Active: 1968–1991
- Country: Soviet Union
- Branch: Soviet Army
- Type: Motorized infantry
- Garrison/HQ: Totskoye

The 213th Motor Rifle Division was a motorized infantry division of the Soviet Army. The division was based in Totskoye and existed from 1968 to 1991. In 1991, the division merged with the 27th Guards Motor Rifle Division.

== History ==
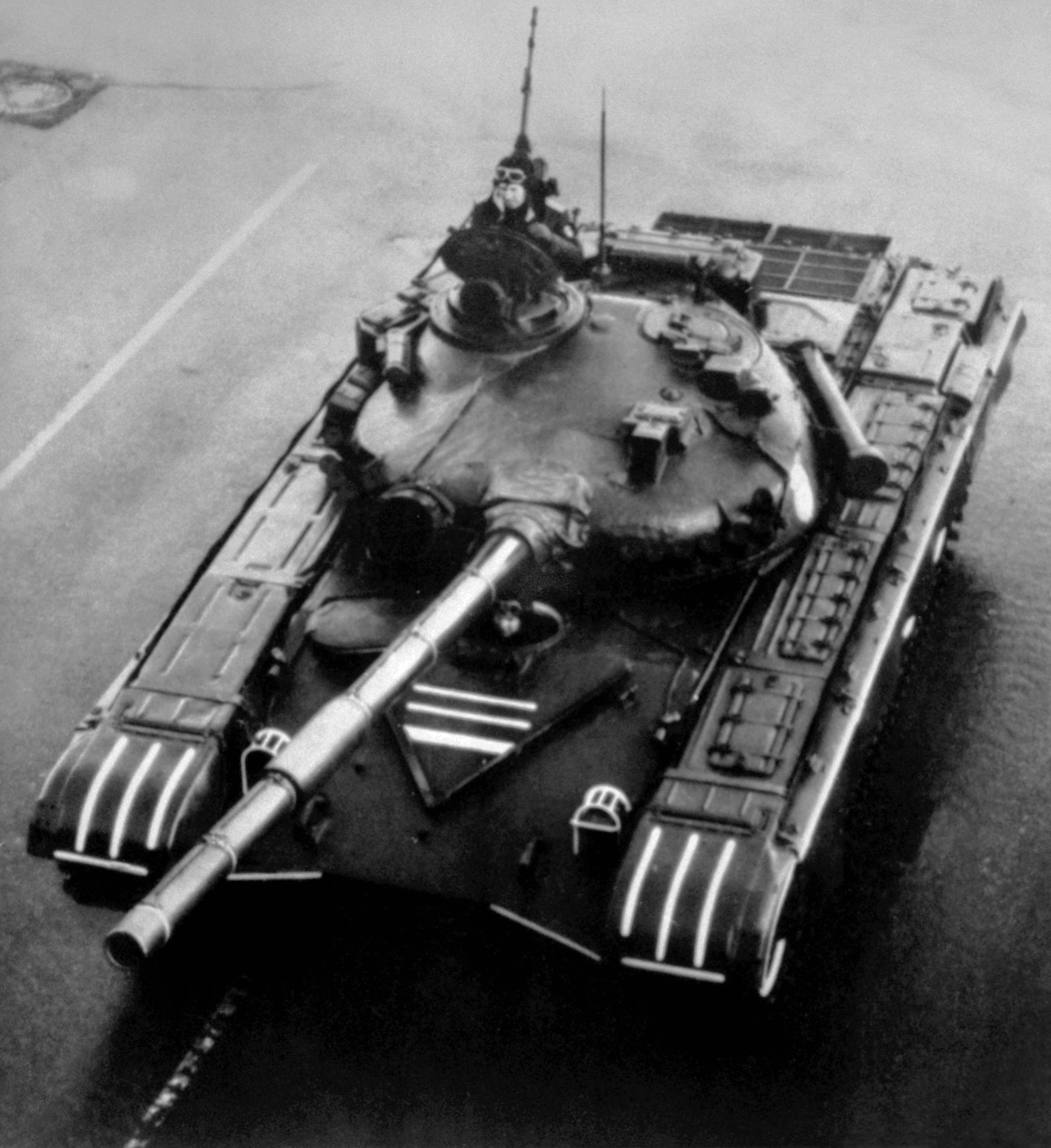
A T-72 tank of the type used by the division

In April 1968, the division was activated in Totskoye, Orenburg Oblast, from the 29th Motor Rifle Division's 433rd Motor Rifle Regiment, left behind when the 29th transferred to the Far East. It was part of the Volga Military District. On 1 September 1980, the 1415th Antiaircraft Artillery Regiment transferred to the 108th Motor Rifle Division in Afghanistan and was replaced by the 108th's 1049th Antiaircraft Artillery Regiment. In September 1989, the Volga Military District was renamed the Volga–Urals Military District. On 1 June 1990, the 1049th Antiaircraft Artillery Regiment was disbanded and replaced by the 838th Antiaircraft Missile Regiment, transferred from the 28th Tank Division.

During the Cold War, the division was maintained at 20–25% strength. On 19 November 1990, according to CFE Treaty data, the division was equipped with 62 T-72 tanks, 139 BTR-70 and 25 BTR-60 armored personnel carriers, 36 BMP-1 and 15 BMP-1K infantry fighting vehicles, 12 2S1 Gvozdika and 36 2S3 Akatsiya self-propelled guns, and 12 BM-21 Grad multiple rocket launcher systems. On 17 April 1991, the division was merged with the 27th Guards Motor Rifle Division, which had arrived from Germany. The 680th and 691st Motor Rifle Regiments, the 34th Tank Regiment, and the 1283rd Artillery Regiment were merged with regiments of the 27th to create new units, which inherited the lineage of the 27th Division unit. The 433rd Motor Rifle Regiment was transferred to the 27th intact, replacing its disbanded 244th Guards Motor Rifle Regiment.

== Composition ==
In 1988, the division included the following units.

- 433rd Motor Rifle Regiment
- 680th Motor Rifle Regiment
- 691st Motor Rifle Regiment
- 34th Tank Regiment
- 1283rd Artillery Regiment
- 1049th Antiaircraft Artillery Regiment
- 182nd Separate Rocket Battalion
- 1034th Separate Anti-Tank Artillery Battalion
- 907th Separate Reconnaissance Battalion
- 883rd Separate Engineer-Sapper Battalion
- 973rd Separate Communications Battalion
- Separate Chemical Defense Company
- 481st Separate Equipment Maintenance and Recovery Battalion
- 341st Separate Medical-Sanitary Battalion
- 893rd Separate Material Supply Battalion
