= Alkino =

Alkino Алькино
- Selo
- Location within Bashkortostan Location within Russia
- Coordinates: 55°05′N 58°04′E
- Country: Russia
- Region: Bashkortostan
- District: Salavatsky District
- Time zone: UTC+5:00

Alkino (Russian: Алькино; Bashkir: Әлкә, Älkä) is a rural locality (a selo) and the administrative centre of Alkinsky Selsoviet, Salavatsky District, Bashkortostan, Russia. The population was 488 as of 2010. There are 13 streets.

== Geography ==
Alkino is located 14 km southwest of Maloyaz (the district's administrative centre) by road. Idrisovo is the nearest rural locality.
