= Central Group of Forces =

Former formation of the Soviet Armed Forces

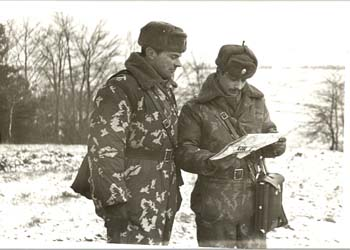
Soviet officers in the Libavá training centre, Olomouc Region, winter 1985

The Central Group of Forces (Russian: Центральная группа войск) was a formation of the Soviet Armed Forces used to incorporate Soviet troops in Central Europe on two occasions: in Austria and Hungary from 1945 to 1955 and troops stationed in Czechoslovakia after the Prague Spring of 1968.

== History ==
=== First formation ===
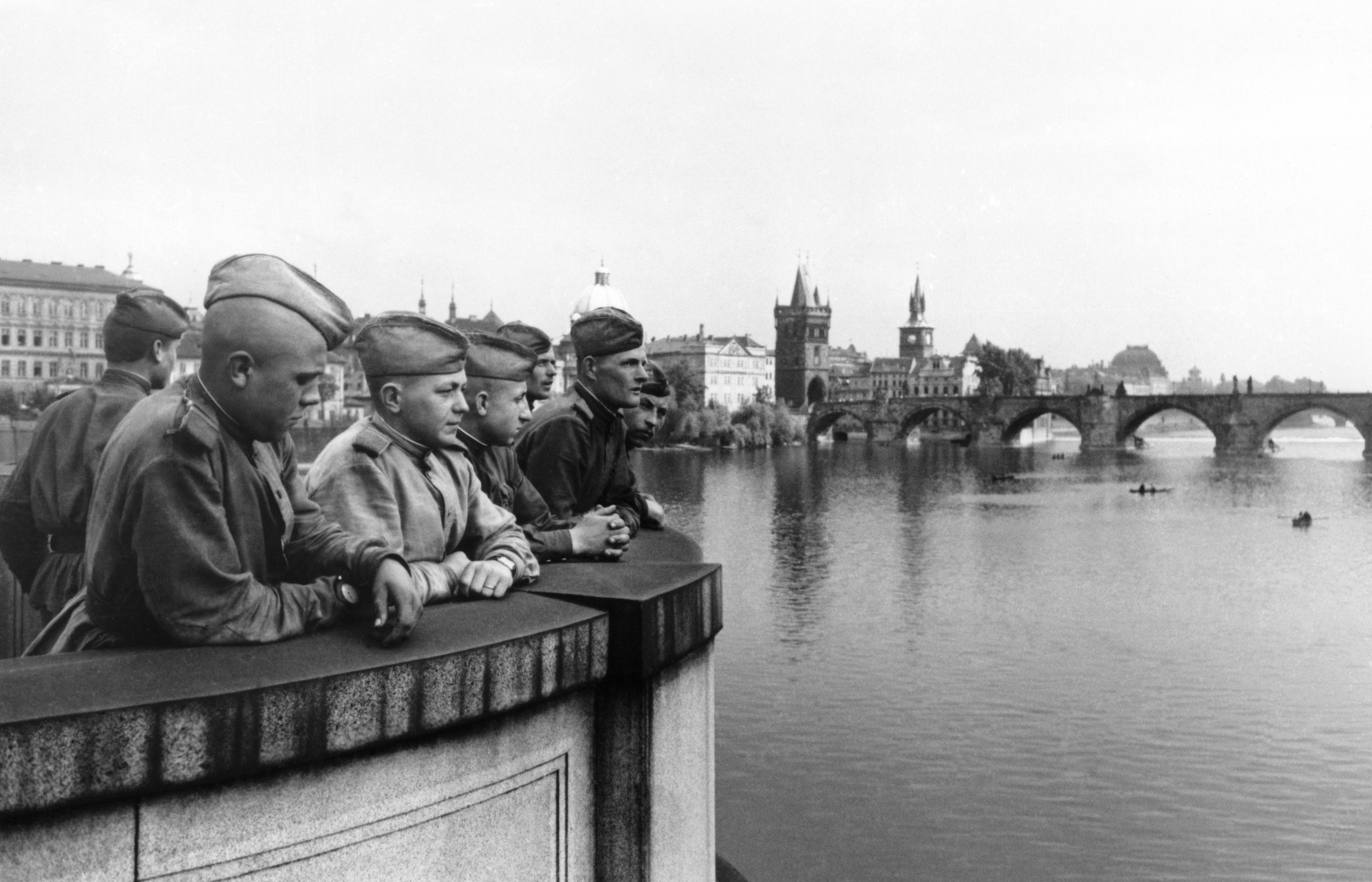
Soviet soldiers on a stroll in Prague, May 1945

After the end of the Second World War, the Soviet High Command (Stavka) reorganized its troops on the territories it liberated from the Nazi occupation and now occupied. Stavka Directive Nr 11097 on 10 June 1945 created several new formations, known as Groups of Forces, equivalent to military districts but located outside the Soviet Union. The Central Group of Forces was created around that time from the 1st Ukrainian Front to control troops in Austria and Hungary, and did so from 1945 until 1955, when Soviet troops were withdrawn from Austria after the Austrian State Treaty was agreed.

Its first commander was Marshal of the Soviet Union Ivan Konev. On its creation it consisted of the 4th, 5th, and 7th and 9th Guards Armies, the 1st Guards Cavalry Corps, the 7th and 10th Breakthrough Artillery Corps, 3rd and 4th Guards Tank Armies, the 2nd Air Army, and the 18th Tank and 7th Guards Mechanized Corps. Headquarters was at Baden bei Wien. During the summer of 1945, 7th and 9th Guards Armies were withdrawn back to the Soviet Union. By the end of the summer, the corps directly subordinated to the group had been withdrawn.

In August 1946, the 4th Guards Army was withdrawn to the Odessa Military District. On 20 March 1947, the 5th Guards Army was disbanded. In May 1947, the 3rd and 4th Guards Mechanized Armies (former 3rd and 4th Guards Tank Armies), now reduced to mobilization divisions, were transferred to the Group of Soviet Occupation Forces in Germany. In February 1949, the 2nd Air Army was renumbered as the 59th.

In June 1955 the group included the following units. The dispositions of the group did not change between then and its disbandment in September.

- Headquarters (1507 military personnel and 308 employees);
- 95th Guards Rifle Poltava Order of Lenin, Red Banner, Orders of Suvorov and Bogdan Khmelnitsky Division - Sankt Pölten
- 13th Guards Mechanized Poltava Order of Lenin, two Red Banner, Orders of Suvorov and Kutuzov Division - Vienna
- 23rd Tarnopol Anti-Aircraft Artillery Division
- Services and rear units (29794 soldiers and 1547 employees) -in the territory of Austria;
- 2nd Guards Mechanized Division - Székesfehérvár
- 17th Guards Mechanized Division - Szombathely
- 152nd Separate Heavy Tank Regiment - Bruck an der Leitha
- Headquarters of the 59th Air Army with its subordinate four air divisions (two fighter divisions in Austria and one bomber/one fighter in Hungary), an independent reconnaissance Air Regiment, a couple of other independent squadrons and flights and several service units (aviation technical battalions, air signal and radar companies, etc.) (7502 soldiers only in Austria) http://www.soviet-airforce.com/en/vpp-kiado/.

The group was disbanded in September 1955 due to the withdrawal of Soviet troops from Austria. The 2nd and 17th Guards Mechanized Division became part of a newly formed Special Corps on Hungarian territory. The 13th Guards Mechanized Division and 95th Guards Rifle Division were moved to the Carpathian Military District. The remaining units, including the headquarters of the 59th Air Army, were disbanded.

==== Commanders ====
- Marshal of the Soviet Union Ivan Konev: 10 June 1945 - 12 June 1946,
- Army General Vladimir Kurasov: 12 June 1946 - 20 April 1949,
- Lieutenant General Vladimir Svirivdov: 20 April 1949 - 14 May 1953,
- Colonel General Sergey Biryuzov: 14 May 1953 - 31 May 1954,
- Colonel General Aleksey Semenovich Zhadov: 31 May 1954 - September 1955.

=== Second formation ===
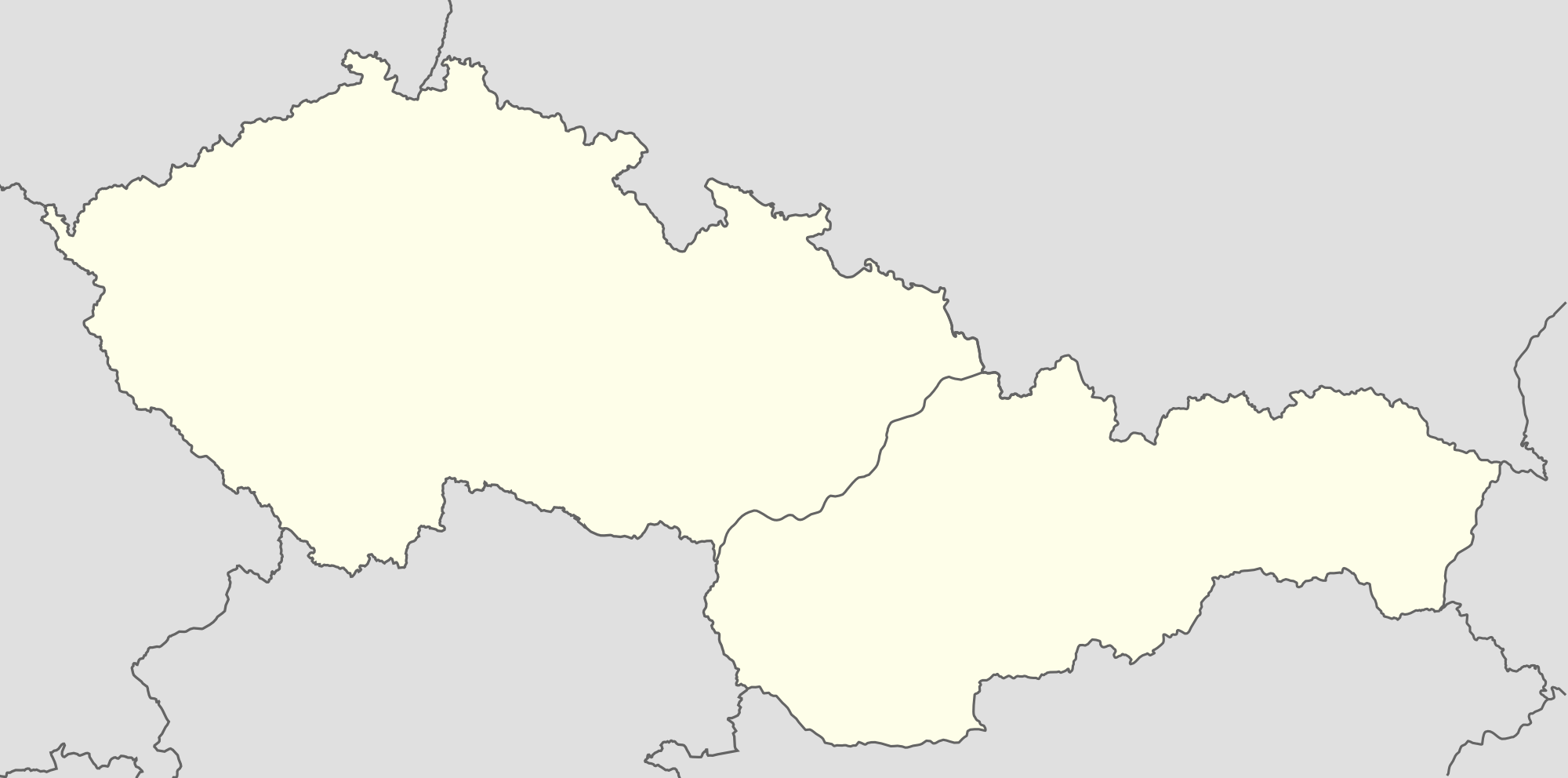
Central Group of Forces locations in 1989)

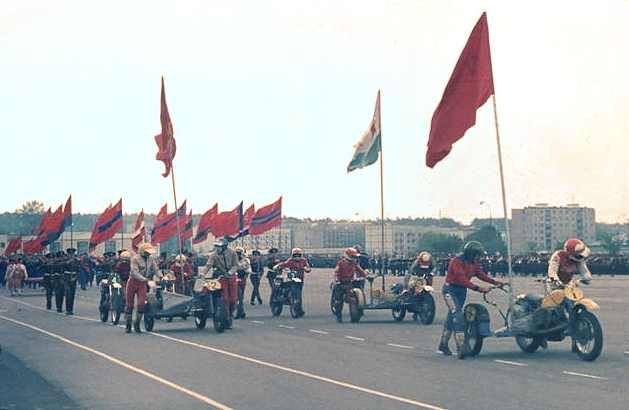
A Victory Day Parade at the group's headquarters, 1984

The Central Group of Forces was reinstituted as a legacy of the 1968 Prague Spring events. Until that time, no Soviet troops were permanently garrisoned within Czechoslovak territory. The Central Group of forces had a total strength of about 85,000 and included 28th Army Corps headquarters (Olomouc, Czechoslovakia, 8.1968 - 7.1991), moved forward from Chernovtsy in the Carpathian Military District. Forces included two tank divisions, three mechanized infantry divisions, three missile brigades, an artillery brigade, and an airborne assault brigade. Four of the five Soviet ground divisions in Czechoslovakia were stationed in the Czech lands (15th Guards Tank Division at Milovice, 18th Guards Motor Rifle Division at Mladá Boleslav, 48th Motor Rifle Division at Vysoké Mýto, and 31st Tank Division at Bruntál), while one was headquartered in Slovakia (the 30th Guards Motor Rifle Division at Zvolen). Group headquarters was located in Milovice (38 km northeast of Prague). Also at Milovice was the 131st Mixed Aviation Division, which arrived from Ivano-Frankovsk in the Ukrainian SSR in August 1968.

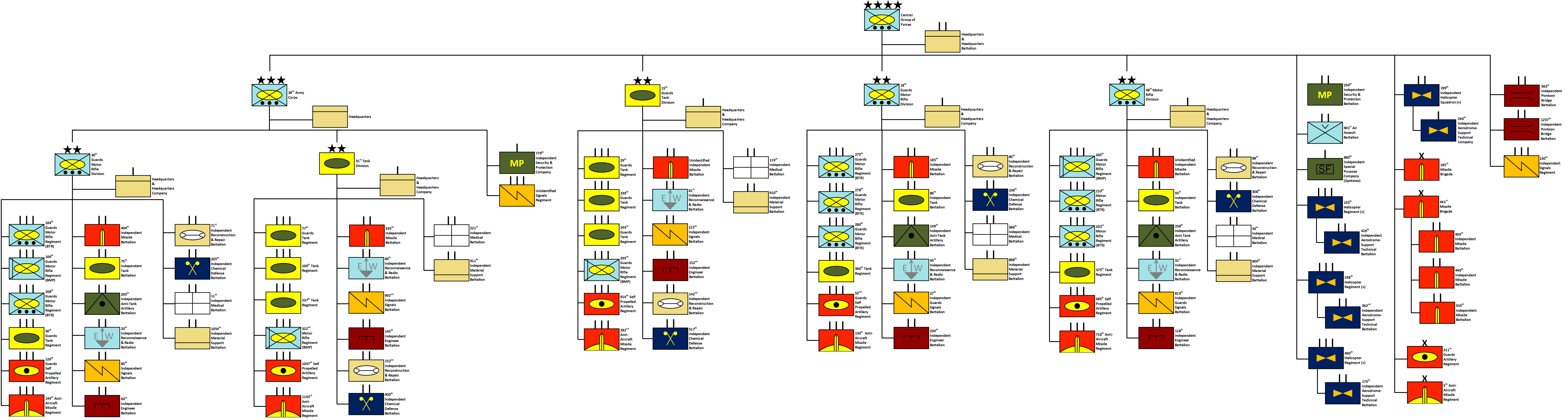
Organization of Central Group of Forces as of 1988

Following the end of the Cold War, the force was withdrawn as follows:

- 28th Army Corps headquarters to Kemerovo, Siberian Military District
- 15th Guards Tank Division to Chebakul, Volga-Ural Military District
- 18th Guards Motor Rifle Division to Kaliningrad, Baltic Military District
- 30th Guards Motor Rifle Division to the 5th Guards Tank Army/5th Guards Army Corps, Byelorussian Military District, and reduced to a storage base
- 31st Tank Division to the Moscow Military District and later amalgamated with 47th Tank Division as 3rd Motor Rifle Division
- 48th Motor Rifle Division – it remained in Czechoslovakia until 1990 when it was the first division to depart (between February and May 1990). 1996 Jane's Intelligence Review information indicated the division had been moved to Smolensk in the Moscow Military District where it was later disbanded. Russian forum information ( and following) indicates that it was actually withdrawn to Chuguyev in Ukraine using the same garrison as the disbanded 75th Guards Tank Division. It appears that there wasn't enough space for the entire division, so the 210th MRR was attached to the 18th Guards Motor Rifle Division. The remainder of the division departed for Ukraine, with the last arriving by May 1991. By then, it had been decided that in order to avoid the restrictions on the CFE Treaty, certain elements of the Soviet Army would be transferred to other non-MOD armed forces. Whole units were transferred to the KGB. When the last of the 48th arrived in Chuguev, the entire division was transferred to the Directorate of Instruction for Special Purposes KGB by June 1991. Regiments included the 265 гв., 1335 мсп, 353 оучб, 31 орб, 813 обс, 88 орвб, 409 обмо, 34 омедб, 99 оиср, 348 орхз. To replace the loss of the 210th MRR, the 255th Guards MRR was formed for the division, probably from what was left of the 75th GTD. From 1992 the government of Ukraine took command of the division, and they later redesignated it the 6th Division of the National Guard of Ukraine. It was eventually in the 1990s reorganised as a brigade.
- 185th Guards Missile Brigade moved to Balkanabat
- 442nd Missile Brigade was withdrawn from Hvězdov, Ralsko, Czechoslovakia, where it had been formed in September 1987, to Shuya in Russia, in May 1990.
- 5th Anti-Aircraft Missile Brigade moved to Shuya
- 238th Separate Helicopter Regiment moved to Kalyniv
- 490th Separate Helicopter Regiment moved to Tula
- 91st Engineer-Sapper Regiment moved to Okhtyrka
- 233rd Separate Radio Engineering Regiment moved to Novosibirsk

The Group was formally disbanded on 19 June 1991.

==== Commanders ====
- 1968–1972: Colonel-General Aleksandr Mayorov
- 1972–1976: Colonel-General Ivan Tenishchev
- 1976–1979: Colonel-General Dmitri Sukhorukov
- 1979–1980: Colonel-General Dmitry Yazov
- 1980–1984: Colonel-General Grigory Borisov
- 1984–1987: Colonel-General Viktor Yermakov
- 1987–1991: Colonel-General Eduard Vorobyev

== Sources ==
- Gawdiak, Ihor (1989). Czechoslovakia : a country study. Washington DC.: Federal Research Division, Library of Congress. "Research completed August 1987." Supersedes the 1982 edition of Czechoslovakia : a country study, edited by Richard F. Nyrop. The sections on the CGF is at pages 232, 233, and 234.
