= 55th Guards Rifle Division =

Infantry division of the Soviet Union

- Active: 1942–1965
- Disbanded: February 6, 1965
- Country: Soviet Union
- Branch: Red Army (1942–1946); Soviet Army (1946–1965)
- Type: Infantry
- Engagements: World War II; Kerch–Eltigen Operation; Operation Bagration; East Prussian Offensive; Battle of Berlin; Prague Offensive

The 55th Guards Rifle Division was a Red Army military unit, engaged in the Second World War. Its full name was the 55th Guards Rifle Irkutsk-Pinsk Order of Lenin, Order of the October Revolution, three Red Banner, Order of Suvorov 2nd degree division named after the Supreme Soviet of the RSFSR.

== History ==
The division was formed on 18 December 1942 by converting the 30th Rifle Division.

It was in battle from 18.12.1942 to 21.04.1944 from 28.05.1944 to 14.09.1944 from 13.10.1944 to 31.03.1945 from 20.04.1945 to 11.05.1945 year.

She took part in the liberation of North Caucasus and the Taman Peninsula. In November 1943, participated in the Kerch–Eltigen amphibious operation, landing on the beach in Danger, Yenikale, is fighting on the Kerch Peninsula until April 1944, then participated in Belorussian strategic operations by participating in the liberation of Ivanovo and Luninets areas Brest Region of Pinsk and Logishin district Pinsk area, eastern Poland, in East Prussian, Berlin and Prague offensive operations.

The division participated in the liberation of the city Novorossiysk, Kerch, Pinsk, taking Gumbinnen and Berlin.

With 28th Army of the 1st Ukrainian Front in May 1945.

55th Guards Rifle Division redesignated 55th Guards Motorised Rifle Division on 20.5.57 in Grodno, Grodno Oblast; became 30th Guards Motor Rifle Division in 1965; taken over by Belarus in 1992. In 1960 part of 28th Army (Soviet Union); in 1968 moved forward into Czechoslovakia and became part of Central Group of Forces; withdrawn to Byelorussian Soviet Socialist Republic in February 1991.

The division was turned over to Belarusian control in March 1992 at Maryina Horka. On August 17, 1992, personnel from the United States Department of Defense made a Conventional Forces in Europe Treaty inspection of an installation in Urechye (near Minsk, Minsk Oblast). Two elements of the 30th Guards Motor Rifle Division, the 30th Guards Tank Regiment and the 20th independent Reconnaissance Battalion, were at the site, along with the 969th Central Base for Reserve Tanks. Also nearby but not inspected was the 63rd Guards independent Engineer-Sapper Battalion.

The division became a mechanized brigade in 1992 and then the 30th Guards Weapons and Equipment Storage Base in 1997. The base was disbanded in 2005, and the new 30th Separate Guards Mechanized Battalion was formed by a 26 May 2005 Minister of Defense decree to perpetuate the traditions of the Irkutsk-Pinsk division. The battalion formed part of the 37th Separate Guards Mechanized Brigade at Polotsk. After the 37th Separate Guards Mechanized Brigade was disbanded in fall 2011, the battalion moved to Zaslonovo and became part of the 19th Guards Mechanized Brigade.

== Higher headquarters ==
- Transcaucasian Front, Black Sea Group of Forces, 56th Army - on 01.01.1943 year.
- North Caucasus Front, 56th Army - from 12.01.1943;
- North Caucasus Front, 37th Army, 11th Guards Rifle Corps - on 01.07.1943;
- North Caucasus Front, 18th Army - on 01.10.1943;
- 7th Army, 11th Guards Rifle Corps - on 01.01.1944;
- Separate Coastal Army, 20th Rifle Corps - on 01.04.1944;
- 1st Belorussian Front, 28th Army, 20th Rifle Corps - on 01.07.1944;
- Stavka, 28th Army, 20th Rifle Corps - on 01.10.1944;
- 3rd Belorussian Front, 28th Army (Soviet Union), 20th Rifle Corps - on 1 January 1945;
- Stavka, 28th Army, 20th Rifle Corps - on 01.04.1945.

== Subordinate units (partial) ==
- 164th Guards Rifle Regiment
- 166th Guards Rifle Regiment
- 168th Guards Rifle Regiment
- 126th Guards Artillery Regiment
- 62 Guards separate self-propelled artillery battalion (62 Guards separate antitank battalion)
