= Samara Kryazh Airport =

Samara Kryazh
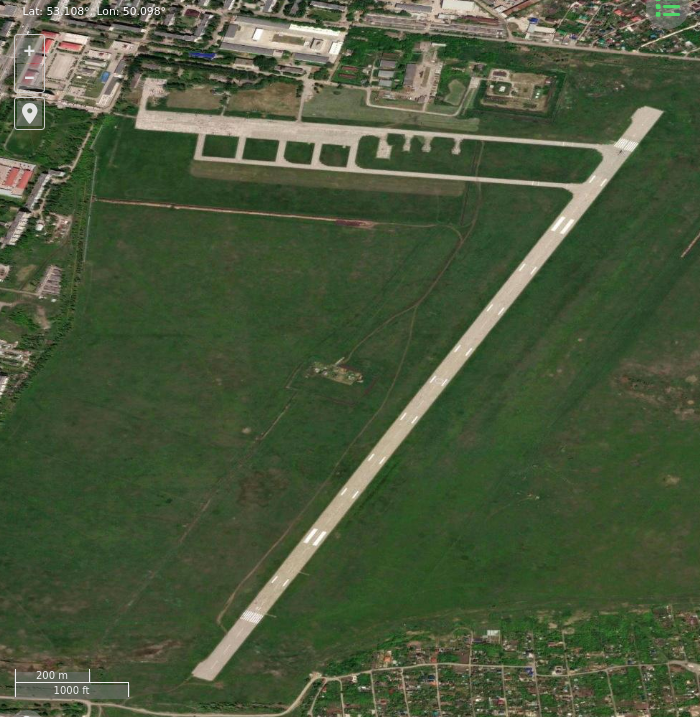
- Satellite imagery of Samara Kryazh Airport
- IATA: none; ICAO: UWWV

Summary
- Airport type: Military
- Operator: National Guard of Russia
- Location: Samara, Russia
- Elevation AMSL: 105 ft / 32 m
- Coordinates: 53°6′30″N 50°5′54″E
- Interactive map of Samara Kryazh

Runways
Direction	Length		Surface
Direction	ft	m	Surface
	6,972	2,125	Concrete

Samara Kryazh (also Kryazh) is an air base in Samara Oblast, Russia located 10 km south of Samara. It was probably the site of the GAZ 1 MiG plant; and was thought to be a missile production site.

Military Units numbered 29666 and 40812, mixed aviation detachments, were reported there during the Cold War.

In 2013 it was used as a sports airfield, with a flying club which is a branch of the Central Army Sports Club - Central Sports Club of the Air Forces (3 An-2 aircraft, 9 Mi-2 helicopters, 3 Yak-54 aircraft, 1 Yak-52 aircraft, 1 Mi-8MT helicopter, 1 Mi-8MTV2 helicopter). Some of the center’s aircraft are located at the Rozhdestveno unpaved airfield, located 15 km to the north. The center provides a full cycle of training for parachutist athletes (from beginners to highly qualified athletes, including specialists from the airborne parachute and search and rescue services of the Air Forces).

The site is now home to the Special Purpose Aviation Detachment Samara on the National Guard of Russia which flies the Mil Mi-8T.

== See also ==
- List of military airbases in Russia
