= Trubnikov =

Trubnikov (Russian: Трубников) is a Russian surname; the feminine version is Trubnikova (Russian: Трубникова). Notable people with this name include:

== Trubnikov ==
- Kuzma Trubnikov (1888–1974), Soviet military commander
- Vyacheslav Trubnikov, Russian intelligence officer and diplomat

== Trubnikova ==
- Daria Trubnikova (born 2003), Russian gymnast
- Maria Trubnikova (1835–1897), Russian feminist
