= Mikhail Kazakov =

Soviet military commander (1901–1979)

Mikhail Ilyich Kazakov
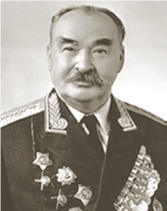
- Kazakov, after 1955
- Born: 9 October [O.S. 26 September] 1901; Velikusha, Vologda Governorate, Russian Empire
- Died: 25 December 1979 (aged 78) Moscow, Soviet Union
- Buried: Novodevichy Cemetery
- Allegiance: Russian SFSR; Soviet Union
- Branch: Red Army (later Soviet Army)
- Service years: 1920–1968
- Rank: Army general
- Commands: 69th Army; 10th Guards Army; Southern Group of Forces; Leningrad Military District
- Conflicts: Russian Civil War; World War II
- Awards: Hero of the Soviet Union; See awards

Mikhail Ilyich Kazakov (Russian: Михаи́л Ильи́ч Казако́в; 9 October [O.S. 26 September] 1901 – 25 December 1979) was an army general of the Soviet Army and a Hero of the Soviet Union.

After serving as an ordinary soldier in the final stages of the Russian Civil War, Kazakov became a political commissar during the 1920s but shifted over to command and staff positions from the mid-1920s. He rose to chief of staff of the Central Asian Military District by the time Operation Barbarossa began, and 1942 and 1943 served as chief of staff and deputy commander of fronts, with a stint as commander of the 69th Army during the Third Battle of Kharkov. Kazakov commanded the 10th Guards Army from early 1944 as it advanced into the Baltic states and blockaded the Courland Pocket. Postwar, he rose to command of the Southern Group of Forces and the Leningrad Military District, ending his career as first deputy chief of the General Staff.

== Early life and Russian Civil War ==
A Russian, Kazakov was born to a peasant family on 9 October 1901 in the village of Velikusha, Vologda Governorate. He completed primary school and after the October Revolution in 1917 became a member of the local revolutionary committee and a soldier in a food detachment. Conscripted into the Red Army in July 1920 during the Russian Civil War, Kazakov was sent to the 3rd Reserve Regiment in Arkhangelsk, and a month later became secretary to the regimental commissar. He fought on the Southern Front from August 1920 as a copyist in the office of the commissar of the 136th Brigade of the 46th Rifle Division, then as a Red Army man of the 407th Rifle Regiment. Kazakov participated in the battles against the Army of Wrangel in the Nikopol bridgehead, the Perekop–Chongar Operation in November and the elimination of anti-Soviet forces in Crimea in December.

== Interwar period ==
After the end of the war, Kazakov served as a political commissar in the 46th and 3rd Crimean Rifle Divisions, serving as a company political commissar in the 21st Rifle Regiment from July 1921. In January 1922 he became assistant commissar of the regiment, then became commissar of the 19th Rifle Regiment in March. Kazakov subsequently became a party organizer in the 7th Regiment before transferring to the 2nd Red Cossack Cavalry Division in June 1924 to become commissar of its 8th Cavalry Regiment. With the division, he became an instructor and propagandist of the division political department before moving to a command role as assistant regimental commander for supply.

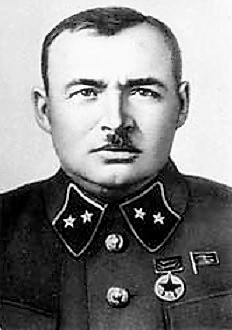
Kazakov as a major general in 1940

Kazakov graduated from the Novocherkassk Cavalry Officers Improvement Course (KUKS) in 1927 and the Frunze Military Academy in 1931. This education prepared him to assume operational positions, and he became deputy chief of the administration and supply department of the Frunze Academy upon his graduation in May 1931. He transferred to the 2nd Cavalry Corps, stationed in the Kiev Military District, to serve as chief of the 1st section of its staff in June 1933, and became commander and commissar of the 29th Cavalry Regiment of the 5th Cavalry Division in March 1936. Promoted to colonel in the same year, Kazakov was sent to study at the General Staff Academy, being appointed deputy chief of staff of the Central Asian Military District upon his graduation in July 1937. Kazakov succeeded to the position of chief of staff of the district in April 1938, rising to the ranks of kombrig on 15 July of that year and komdiv on 31 December 1939. When the Red Army introduced general officer ranks on 4 June 1940, he became a major general.

== World War II ==
Shortly after the beginning of Operation Barbarossa, Kazakov became chief of staff of the 53rd Separate Army, formed from the Central Asian Military District for the Anglo-Soviet invasion of Iran. While the army was stationed in Iran, he served as its acting commander in late October. After the army headquarters was disbanded, Kazakov's request to be sent to the front was granted and in January 1942 he became chief of staff of the Bryansk Front. Transferring to serve in the same position with the Voronezh Front on 20 July, Kazakov participated in the organization of training and planning for the Ostrogozhsk–Rossosh Offensive and the Voronezh–Kastornoye operation.

Promoted to lieutenant general in January 1943, Kazakov commanded the 69th Army in February and March 1943. After the Third Battle of Kharkov, he became assistant commander of the forces of the Reserve Front, which ultimately became the Steppe Front, in April. In July he transferred to become deputy commander of the Bryansk Front, which became the Baltic Front on 10 October and then the 2nd Baltic Front ten days later. Kazakov was given command of the 10th Guards Army of the front on 20 January 1944 and led it for the rest of the war in the Riga Offensive and the blockade of the Courland Pocket. He was promoted to colonel general in September. For his "skillful leadership and personal courage" displayed in the war, Kazakov was made a Hero of the Soviet Union in February 1978.

== Postwar ==
After the end of the war, Kazakov commanded the army until August 1946, and participated in the Moscow Victory Parade of 1945. Transferred to the Transcaucasian Military District, he became district deputy commander in August 1946 and its chief of staff in February 1947. Relieved from his post for "an incorrect attitude to the issues of national formations" in the district, Kazakov was appointed assistant commander of the forces of the South Ural Military District, effectively a demotion. This proved temporary as he was appointed chief of staff of the Odessa Military District in November 1950 and commander of the Ural Military District in May 1953. Promoted to army general in August 1955, Kazakov was appointed deputy commander-in-chief of the Ground Forces for combat training in January 1956. His rise to senior posts continued and he commanded the Southern Group of Forces in Hungary from December of that year and then the Leningrad Military District from October 1960. Kazakov was appointed chief of the Combined Staff of the Unified Armed Forces of the Warsaw Treaty Organization and simultaneous first deputy chief of the General Staff in November 1965. This proved to be his last active post as in August 1968 he was effectively retired as an inspector-advisor of the Group of Inspectors General. Kazakov died in Moscow on 25 December 1979 and was buried at the Novodevichy Cemetery.

== Awards and honors ==
Kazakov was a recipient of the following decorations:

- Hero of the Soviet Union
- Order of Lenin (3)
- Order of the October Revolution
- Order of the Red Banner (4)
- Order of Suvorov, 1st and 2nd classes
- Order of Kutuzov, 1st class
- Order of the Red Star (2)
- Order "For Service to the Homeland in the Armed Forces of the USSR", 3rd class
- Medals
- Foreign orders and medals
