= 25th Rifle Division =

Red Army division of Second World War

- Active: I Formation: 1918–1942; II Formation: 1943–1946
- Country: Soviet Union
- Branch: Red Army
- Type: Infantry
- Size: Division
- Engagements: Russian Civil War: Eastern Front of the Russian Civil War; Polish-Soviet War: Kiev offensive (1920); Soviet invasion of Poland; Soviet occupation of Bessarabia and Northern Bukovina; World War II: Operation München; Siege of Odessa (1941); Crimean Campaign; Siege of Sevastopol (1941-42)
- Decorations: Order of Lenin (1st formation); Order of the Red Banner (1st formation)
- Battle honours: named for V.I. Chapayev

Commanders
- Notable commanders: Gaspar Voskanyan; Mikhail Velikanov Vasily Chapayev; Vladimir Kurdyumov; Kuzma Trubnikov; Ivan Yefimovich Petrov Trofim Kolomiets

The 25th Rifle Division (Russian: 25-я стрелковая дивизия) was a rifle division of the Soviet Union's Red Army during the Second World War, formed twice.

Formed in 1918, it was a Russian, and later Soviet, Red Army formation formed on the Eastern Front during the Russian Civil War. It was named after its first commander, Vasily Chapayev. As Chapayev's command it gained fame during the war and as a result received his name, designated the 25th Chapayev Rifle Division (Russian: 25-я Чапаевская стрелковая дивизия). The division was transferred west to fight in the Polish–Soviet War and was stationed in Ukraine during the interwar period. Moved forward to participate in the Soviet occupation of Bessarabia in 1940, the division retreated east after Germany invaded the Soviet Union in Operation Barbarossa. It was disbanded after being destroyed in the siege of Sevastopol in mid-1942.

The 25th was formed for a second time, without inheriting the honors of the original unit, in 1943. This unit served in the Arkhangelsk Military District without seeing combat in the rest of the war, and was disbanded shortly after the end of the war.

== Russian Civil War ==
The division was formed in 1918 at the beginning of the Russian Civil War under the command of Vasily Chapayev. Chapayev previously served in the Imperial Russian Army during World War I. The division deployed to the Urals where it fought the Ural Cossacks in the Zavolzhye region. On October 7, 1918, the division fought at Samara, on March 11, 1919, it fought at Uralsk, and on January 2, 1920, the division occupied entered Atyrau (then Guriev) for the Bolsheviks.

In May 1920, the division transferred to the Ukrainian front. It aided the successful defence of Kiev against the Poles, before moving on to capture Kovel and participate in further operations along the Southern Bug. From April 1921 to the December 1922 the division was responsible for suppressing Ukrainian independence forces.

== Interwar period ==
On 30 November 1921 the division was renamed the 25th Poltava Rifle Division before becoming the 25th Kremenchug Rifle Division on 4 January 1922. In 1922 the division became part of the Ukrainian Military District, which became the Kiev Military District in 1935. Its former designation, the 25th Chapayev Red Banner Rifle Division, was restored on 11 July 1925. The division was awarded the Honorary Revolutionary Red Banner in 1928 and the Order of Lenin in 1933. The division transferred to the Odessa Military District in May 1940 in preparation for the Soviet occupation of Bessarabia in June and July of that year. After participating in the occupation, the 25th became part of the 9th Army.

== World War II ==
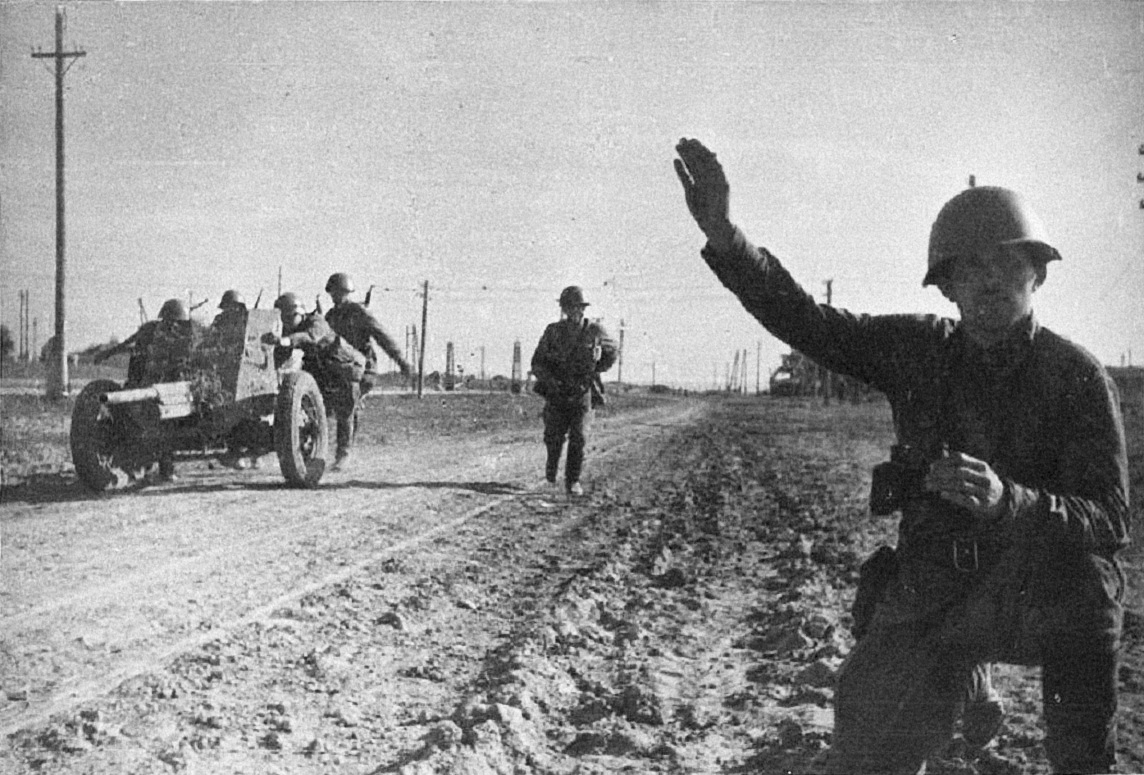
Anti-tank gun platoon commander of the division's 164th Separate Destroyer Anti-Tank Gun Battalion Lieutenant Vasily Gavrilovich Kabanenko gives a command to his gun crew, while repulsing a tank attack in August 1941

On June 24, 1941, Stavka Order #20466 attached the 25th Rifle Division to the 14th Rifle Corps, 9th Army, Southern Front. It took part in the Battle of Odessa, and was evacuated by sea in October 1941 prior to the city's fall. The division arrived in Sevastopol in time to prepare for the defence of the port against the oncoming German offensive. The division was destroyed during the following siege of Sevastopol in July 1942. The sniper Lyudmila Pavlichenko served with the division in this period, credited with a total of 309 kills.

The division was subsequently reformed in the Arkhangelsk Military District in 1943. It did not see any further action in the Second World War. While Poirer and Connor list further fighting it took part in, it is believed that this information was incorrect. It was attached to the 4th Rifle Corps of the Belomorsky Military District in May 1945.

== Postwar ==
The division (Military Unit Number 15887) was disbanded on 10 July 1946 along with the corps. The name 'Chapeyevskaya' was later given to the 25th Guards Rifle Division.
