= Northern Military District (Soviet Union) =

Military district of the Soviet Union (1951–1960)

The Northern Military District (Russian: Северный военный округ) was a Military District in the Soviet Union that existed from June 29, 1951, to March 18, 1960.

== History ==
The Northern Military District was formed on June 29, 1951, by renaming the former Belomorsky Military District (at the same time that name was given to the Arkhangelsk Military District). It included the territories of the Karelo-Finnish SSR (since 1956 - the Karelian ASSR) and the Murmansk region. On April 4, 1956, the territory of the abolished Belomorsky Military District (Arkhangelsk, Vologda regions and the Komi ASSR) was also transferred to the district. The HQ of the Military District was based in Petrozavodsk.

On March 18, 1960, the district was disbanded with the transfer of territory and troops to the Leningrad Military District (main part of the territory) and the Ural Military District (the territory of the Komi ASSR).

== Commanders of the Northern Military District ==
- Marshal of the Soviet Union Kirill Meretskov (June 1951 - May 1954),
- Colonel General Vladimir Kolpakchi (May 1954 - January 1956),
- Colonel General Andrei Stuchenko (January 1956 - March 1960).
