= Vladimir Kachalov =

Soviet general

Vladimir Yakovlevich Kachalov
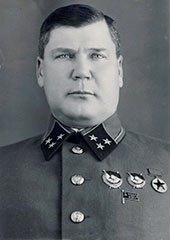
- Vladimir Kachalov
- Born: 27 July 1890; Russian Empire
- Died: 4 August 1941 (aged 51) Smolensk region, Russian SFSR, Soviet Union
- Allegiance: Russian Empire; Soviet Union
- Service years: 1911–1912, 1914–1917 (Russian Empire); 1918–1941 (Soviet Union)
- Rank: Lieutenant general
- Commands: 6th Rifle Division; North Caucasus Military District; Arkhangelsk Military District; 28th Army
- Conflicts: World War I; Russian Civil War; World War II; Battle of Smolensk †

Vladimir Yakovlevich Kachalov (Russian: Владимир Яковлевич Качалов; 27 July 1890 – 4 August 1941) was a Soviet lieutenant general. He fought in the Imperial Russian Army during World War I before going over to the Bolsheviks in the subsequent Civil War. He was a recipient of the Order of the Red Banner and the Order of the Patriotic War. He was promoted to Komdiv in 1936, Komkor in 1938, and then Komandarm 2nd rank in 1939. He was killed in action at Smolensk by artillery fire. Joseph Stalin, unaware of his death because of an inaccurate report of the events by Lev Mekhlis, stated in Order No. 270 that Kachalov surrendered and defected to the Nazis; he was subsequently sentenced to death in absentia. It was not until 1953 that an investigation established the circumstances of Kachalov's death and cleared his name.

== Bibliography ==
- Kuzelenkov, V.N., ed. (2005). Командный и начальствующий состав Красной Армии в 1940-1941 гг [Commanders and command staff of the Red Army 1940–1941] (in Russian). Moscow/St. Petersburg: Letny sad. pp. 151–152. ISBN 5-94381-137-0.
- Vozhakin, Mikhail Georgievich, ed. (2005). Великая Отечественная. Командармы. Военный биографический словарь [The Great Patriotic War: Army Commanders: Military Biographical Dictionary] (in Russian). Moscow: Kuchkovo Pole. pp. 89–90. ISBN 5860901135.
- Коллектив составителей и редакторов (2006). Военный совет при народном комиссаре обороны СССР. 1938, 1940 гг.: Документы и материалы (1000 экз ed.). М.: РОССПЭН. p. 336. ISBN 5-8243-0694-X.
- Жуков Г. К. «Воспоминания и размышления» В 2 т. — М.: Олма-Пресс, 2002.
- Лукин М. Ф. "Мы не сдаёмся, товарищ генерал!" // Огонёк. 1964. №52. С. 16.

== Sources ==
- Т. Сидорова. Трагедия генерала Качалова.

Military offices
Preceded by	Commander of the 6th Rifle Division; 1931-1936	Succeeded by
Preceded by Vladimir Kurdyumov	Commander of the Arkhangelsk Military District; April 1940 – June 1941	Succeeded by Vladimir Romanovsky
