= List of shipwrecks in August 1857 =

The list of shipwrecks in August 1857 includes ships sunk, wrecked or otherwise lost during August 1857.

== 2 August ==
List of shipwrecks: 2 August 1857
| Ship | State | Description |
|---|---|---|
| Eliza | United Kingdom | The ship collided with the steamship City of London (United Kingdom) and sank off the Newark Lightship ( Trinity House). She was on a voyage from Rotterdam, South Holland, Netherlands to Newcastle upon Tyne, Northumberland. |
| Margaret Ann | (United Kingdom of Great Britain and Ireland) British North America | The schooner was run down and sunk by Maria Joseph (United States). Her crew were rescued. |

== 3 August ==
List of shipwrecks: 3 August 1857
| Ship | State | Description |
|---|---|---|
| Wharton, or Winstay | United Kingdom | The Mersey Flat was wrecked on Jordan's Bank, in the River Mersey her crew were rescued by the gig I will if I can or the tug Uncle Sam (both United Kingdom). |

== 4 August ==
List of shipwrecks: 4 August 1857
| Ship | State | Description |
|---|---|---|
| Angelina | United Kingdom | The schooner sprang a leak and sank in the Scheldt. She was on a voyage from Sunderland, County Durham to Antwerp, Belgium. |
| Hawk | United Kingdom | The ship ran aground on the Newcombe Sand, in the North Sea off the coast of Suffolk. She was refloated. |
| Lightning | United Kingdom | The brig ran aground. She was on a voyage from Newcastle upon Tyne, Northumberland to Helsingør, Denmark. She was refloated. |

== 5 August ==
List of shipwrecks: 5 August 1857
| Ship | State | Description |
|---|---|---|
| Dorothea Alice | United Kingdom | The ship was wrecked in the White Sea near "Lembaffsky", Russia. Her crew were rescued. She was on a voyage from Sunderland, County Durham to Arkhangelsk, Russia. |
| J. C. Morrison | (United Kingdom of Great Britain and Ireland) British North America | The steamship was destroyed by fire and sank in Lake Simcoe at Barrie, Province of Canada. |

== 6 August ==
List of shipwrecks: 6 August 1857
| Ship | State | Description |
|---|---|---|
| Appleton | United Kingdom | The brig was lost near Inagua, Bahamas. She was on a voyage from Cuba to Swansea, Glamorgan. |
| Lizzie | United Kingdom | The ship was driven ashore and wrecked at Hayburn Wyke, Yorkshire. She was on a voyage from London to Sunderland, County Durham. |

== 7 August ==
List of shipwrecks: 7 August 1857
| Ship | State | Description |
|---|---|---|
| Beacon | United Kingdom | The schooner was wrecked on Swan Island, Tasmania. |
| Britain's Queen | United Kingdom | The ship was wrecked on the Lucipara Shoal, in the Banca Strait. Her crew were rescued. |
| Margaret Jane | United Kingdom | The ship ran aground on The Shingles, in the English Channel off the Isle of Wight. She was on a voyage from Exeter, Devon to Newcastle upon Tyne, Northumberland. She was refloated and taken in to Cowes, Isle of Wight in a severely leaky condition. |
| Namoa | United Kingdom | The schooner was lost in Good Hope Bay, Chian. |
| Nautilus | United Kingdom | The ship foundered in the North Sea off Whitby, Yorkshire. Her crew were rescued. She was on a voyage from South Shields, County Durham to King's Lynn, Norfolk and/or London. |
| Pallion Hall | United Kingdom | The brig suffered an onboard explosion and sank in the North Sea off Robin Hoods Bay, Yorkshire. Her crew were rescued. She was on a voyage from Sunderland, County Durham to Boulogne, Pas-de-Calais, France or . |
| Societé | France | The schooner was run down and sunk in the North Sea off Spurn Point, Yorkshire by the steamship Tiger (United Kingdom). Her crew were rescued. |
| Vigilant | United Kingdom | The ship was beached at Bridlington, Yorkshire. She was on a voyage from Seaham, County Durham to London. She was refloated and taken in to Bridlington. |

== 8 August ==
List of shipwrecks: 8 August 1857
| Ship | State | Description |
|---|---|---|
| Caroline | United Kingdom | The ship caught fire whilst on a voyage from Liverpool, Lancashire to Panama City, Republic of New Granada. She put in to Bahia, Brazil where she was scuttled, but still burnt out. Her crew survived. |

== 9 August ==
List of shipwrecks: 9 August 1857
| Ship | State | Description |
|---|---|---|
| Eliza Jane | United Kingdom | The schooner was driven ashore at Great Yarmouth, Norfolk. She was on a voyage from Exeter, Devon to Newcastle upon Tyne, Northumberland. She was refloated and taken in to Great Yarmouth. |
| William IV | United Kingdom | The schooner was driven ashore at Great Yarmouth. She was on a voyage from Bridgwater, Somerset to Great Yarmouth. She was refloated and taken in to port. |

== 10 August ==
List of shipwrecks: 10 August 1857
| Ship | State | Description |
|---|---|---|
| Banchory | United Kingdom | The brig ran aground on the Holme Sand, in the North Sea off the coast of Suffolk. She was on a voyage from Seaham, County Durham to London and/or Folkestone, Kent. She was refloated the next day. |
| Enchantress | United Kingdom | The brig ran aground on the Holme Sand. She was on a voyage from South Shields, County Durham to Rouen, Seine-Inférieure, France. She was refloated the next day and taken in to Lowestoft, Suffolk. |
| Gapsal (Гапсаль, 'Haapsalu') | Imperial Russian Navy | The transport ship struck a reef off Cape Orlov-Tersky in the White Sea, sprang a leak and lost steering, but managed to return to Arkhangelsk. She was on a voyage from Arkhangelsk to Kronstadt. |

== 11 August ==
List of shipwrecks: 11 August 1857
| Ship | State | Description |
|---|---|---|
| Esk | Norway | The barque ran aground on the Goodwin Sands, Kent, United Kingdom. She was on a voyage from Liverpool, Lancashire, United Kingdom to Riga, Russia. |
| Midge | United Kingdom | The ship ran around at Inverness. She was on a voyage from Inverness to Newcastle upon Tyne, Northumberland. She was refloated and put back to Inverness. |
| Zouave | United Kingdom | The steamship collided with the steamship Elf (United Kingdom) and sank in the North Sea. Her crew were rescued by Elf. Zouave was on a voyage from Stettin to Leith, Lothian. |

== 12 August ==
List of shipwrecks: 12 August 1857
| Ship | State | Description |
|---|---|---|
| Active | United Kingdom | The schooner ran aground at Lossiemouth, Moray and was damaged. She was on a voyage from Burghead, Moray to Hartlepool, County Durham. |
| Bell and Mary | United Kingdom | The schooner struck a rock off the Isle of Harris, Outer Hebrides and sank. |
| Helen | United Kingdom | The brig ran aground on the Holme Sand, in the North Sea off the coast of Suffolk. She was on a voyage from South Shields, County Durham to London. She was refloated the next day. |
| Waterloo | United Kingdom | The paddle steamer ran ashore at Ballywalter, County Down. She was on a voyage from Liverpool, Lancashire to Belfast, County Antrim. Waterloo was refloated on 16 August and taken in to Belfast. |

== 13 August ==
List of shipwrecks: 13 August 1857
| Ship | State | Description |
|---|---|---|
| Cuthberts | United Kingdom | The ship was driven ashore on the Mull of Kintyre, Argyllshire. She was on a voyage from Greenock, Renfrewshire to Quebec City, Province of Canada, British North America. She was refloated. |
| Isabella | United Kingdom | The ship was driven ashore at Whitby, Yorkshire. She was on a voyage from South Shields, County Durham to London. She had become a wreck by 17 August. |
| St. Jean Baptiste | France | The lugger was abandoned in the North Sea and foundered. Her three crew were rescued by Falcon (United Kingdom). St. Jean Baptiste was on a voyage from Blyth, Northumberland, United Kingdom to Dunkirk, Nord. |
| Tryall | United Kingdom | The ship was driven ashore and wrecked on the Mull of Kintyre. She was on a voyage from Barmouth, Merionethshire to Wick, Caithness. |
| Varna | United Kingdom | The ship was driven ashore on Sanday, Inner Hebrides. She was on a voyage from the Clyde to Melbourne, Victoria. She was refloated and put back to the Clyde. |

== 15 August ==
List of shipwrecks: 15 August 1857
| Ship | State | Description |
|---|---|---|
| Earl of Clarendon | United Kingdom | The ship ran aground on the Collee Rock, off Macduff, Aberdeenshire. She floated off and sank with the loss of two of her five crew. She was on a voyage from Sunderland, County Durham to Macduff. Earl of Clarendon was refloated on 17 August and taken in to Banff, Aberdeenshire. |
| Emily and Anne | United Kingdom | The sloop was in collision with the steamship Sea Nymph (United Kingdom) and sank in the North Sea off Flamborough Head, Yorkshire with the loss of one of her three crew. Emily and Anne was on a voyage from Sunderland to Southwold, Suffolk. |
| Eupatoria | United Kingdom | The steamship was wrecked on a rock north of Flamborough Head, Yorkshire. Her crew were rescued. She was on a voyage from South Shields, County Durham to Paimbœuf, Loire-Inférieure, France. |
| Istock | United Kingdom | The ship was driven ashore near Kertch, Russia. She was on a voyage from Taganrog, Russia to a British port. |
| John and Jane | United Kingdom | The ship was driven ashore at Blyth, Northumberland. She was on a voyage from Perth to Seaham, County Durham. She was refloated and taken in to Blyth. |
| J. W. Harris | United States | The steamship collided with the steamship Metropolitan (United States) and sank at New York with the loss of sixteen of the 27 people on board. |

== 16 August ==
List of shipwrecks: 16 August 1857
| Ship | State | Description |
|---|---|---|
| Bonite | France | The schooner ran aground on the Sunk Sand, in the North Sea off the coast of Essex. She was on a voyage from Sunderland, County Durham, United Kingdom to Bordeaux, Gironde. She was refloated with the assistance of the smacks Agenoria and Tryall (both United Kingdom) and taken in to Harwich, Essex. |
| Garland | United Kingdom | The brig sprang a leak and foundered off Cromer, Norfolk. Her crew were rescued by the brig Good Intent. Garland was on a voyage from South Shields, County Durham to Calais, France. |
| Hibernia | United Kingdom | The brig was driven on the West Scar Rocks, on the coast of County Durham. She was on a voyage from Hartlepool, County Durham to London. She was refloated and towed in to Hartlepool. |
| John and Jane | United Kingdom | The schooner was driven ashore at Blyth, Northumberland. She was on a voyage from Perth to Seaham, County Durham. She was refloated. |
| Success | United Kingdom | The ship foundered in the Baltic Sea. Her crew were rescued. She was on a voyage from Stettin to Gothenburg, Sweden. |
| Thomas | (United Kingdom of Great Britain and Ireland) British North America | The barque was driven ashore on the Rhins of Islay, Inner Hebrides. She was on a voyage from the Clyde to Halifax, Nova Scotia. She had become a wreck by 24 August. |

== 17 August ==
List of shipwrecks: 17 August 1857
| Ship | State | Description |
|---|---|---|
| Andrew Marvell | United Kingdom | The derelict ship was in collision with the pilot cutter Whim (United Kingdom). She was taken in to Great Yarmouth, Norfolk. |
| Arrow | United Kingdom | The ship was driven ashore and wrecked in Pinkester Cove, Isle of Wight. |
| Berthe et Lenore | France | The schooner collided with the steamship Britannia (United Kingdom) and sank in the English Channel west of Dungeness, Kent, United Kingdom Her crew were rescued by Britannia. Berthe et Leonore was on a voyage from Nantes, Loire-Inférieure to Dunkirk, Nord. |
| Carl Johan | Prussia | The barque collided with the steamship Scandinavian (Sweden) and foundered off the mouth of the Humber 1.5 nautical miles (2.8 km) south west of the Spurn Lighthouse, Yorkshire, United Kingdom. Her crew were rescued by Scandinavian, apart from one crew member rescued by a Prussian ship. Carl Johan was on a voyage from Taganrog, Russia to Hull, Yorkshire. |
| City of Toronto | United Kingdom | The ship was driven ashore in the Strait of Belle Isle. She was on a voyage from Liverpool, Lancashire to Montreal, Province of Canada, British North America. She had been refloated by 1 September and taken in to "Porteau", where she was condemned. |
| Manhow | Portugal | The full-rigged ship ran aground on the Wellunga Reef. She was on a voyage from Hong Kong to Guichen Bay. She was refloated and towed in to Sydney, New South Wales for repairs. |
| Maria | United Kingdom | The ship was wrecked on the Northern Triangles. She was on a voyage from British Honduras to Cork. |
| Telegraphen | Denmark | The schooner was driven ashore and wrecked on Sanday, Orkney Islands, United Kingdom. She was on a voyage from Danzig to Londonderry, United Kingdom. |

== 18 August ==
List of shipwrecks: 18 August 1857
| Ship | State | Description |
|---|---|---|
| Eltje Heidema | Netherlands | The ship was driven ashore and wrecked at Thisted, Denmark. Her crew were rescued. She was on a voyage from Newcastle upon Tyne, Northumberland, United Kingdom to Saint Petersburg, Russia. |
| Isabella | United Kingdom | The ship was driven ashore at Whitby, Yorkshire. |
| Riga | United States | The ship was damaged in a gale at City Point, Virginia. She had been towed in to Norfolk, Virginia for repairs by 22 August. |
| Three Sisters | United Kingdom | The schooner struck the Monckstone and sank. Her crew were rescued. She was on a voyage from Newport, Monmouthshire to Liverpool, Lancashire. |

== 19 August ==
List of shipwrecks: 19 August 1857
| Ship | State | Description |
|---|---|---|
| Amalia Pratalonga | Kingdom of Sardinia | The barque was wrecked on the Northern Triangles. She was on a voyage from Belize City, British Honduras to an English port. |
| Maria Louisa | United Kingdom | The ship sprang a leak and was abandoned in the English Channel 16 nautical miles (30 km) south west of The Lizard, Cornwall. Her crew were rescued. She was on a voyage from Brăila, Ottoman Empire to Falmouth, Cornwall and Waterford. |

== 20 August ==
List of shipwrecks: 20 August 1857
| Ship | State | Description |
|---|---|---|
| Dunbar | United Kingdom | The ship was driven ashore and wrecked near Sydney, New South Wales, with the loss of all but one of the 122 people on board. She was on a voyage from London to Sydney. |
| Jane Pratt | United Kingdom | The ship departed from Calcutta, India for Hong Kong. No further trace, presumed foundered with the loss of all hands. |
| Ville de Metz | France | The ship ran aground in the Gironde. She was on a voyage from Bordeaux, Gironde to Cardiff, Glamorgan, United Kingdom and Hong Kong. She had been refloated by 31 August. |

== 21 August ==
List of shipwrecks: 21 August 1857
| Ship | State | Description |
|---|---|---|
| Camilla | United Kingdom | The ship sprang a leak and sank in the North Sea off North Shields, County Durham. Her crew were rescued. She was on a voyage from Sunderland, County Durham to Dundee, Forfarshire. |
| Conservative | United Kingdom | The ship was wrecked at Calcutta, India. |
| San Salvador | Portugal | The schooner was wrecked at Santa Clara, Azores. |

== 22 August ==
List of shipwrecks: 22 August 1857
| Ship | State | Description |
|---|---|---|
| Australasian | United Kingdom | The steamship ran aground in the Clyde. She was on a voyage from Govan, Renfrewshire to Southampton, Hampshire. She was refloated the next day. |
| Frederike | Grand Duchy of Oldenburg | The ship was driven ashore and wrecked at Peterhead, Aberdeenshire, United Kingdom. She was on a voyage from Peterhead to Bremen. |
| Mercurius | United Kingdom | The barque capsized at Liverpool, Lancashire. She was righted on 25 August. |
| Perseverance | (United Kingdom of Great Britain and Ireland) British North America | The barque ran ashore in Friswick Bay, in the Pentland Firth. She was on a voyage from Dundee, Forfarshire to Miramichi, New Brunswick. |
| 712 | Russia | The lighter sank at Saint Petersburg. |

== 23 August ==
List of shipwrecks: 23 August 1857
| Ship | State | Description |
|---|---|---|
| Atalante | Grand Duchy of Mecklenburg-Schwerin | The galiot ran aground on the Domesnes Reef, in Riga Bay. She was on a voyage from Riga, Russia to Stockton-on-Tees, County Durham, United Kingdom. She was refloated and resumed her voyage in a leaky condition. |
| Cora | United Kingdom | The ship foundered in the North Sea. Her crew were rescued by the brig Gitana (United Kingdom). |
| Gaule | France | The brig ran aground on the Saltscar Rocks, on the coast of Yorkshire, United Kingdom. She was on a voyage from Blyth, Northumberland, United Kingdom to Nantes, Loire-Inférieure. She was refloated with the aid of a tug and towed in to Middlesbrough, Yorkshire for repairs. |
| Ripple | United Kingdom | The cutter ran aground and capsized at Jersey, Channel Islands. |

== 24 August ==
List of shipwrecks: 24 August 1857
| Ship | State | Description |
|---|---|---|
| Adriana Sophia | (flag) Netherlands | The galiot foundered in the North Sea. Her crew were rescued by Trio (United Kingdom). |
| Champion | (United Kingdom of Great Britain and Ireland) Victoria | The steamship collided with the steamship Ladybird ( (United Kingdom of Great Britain and Ireland) Victoria) and foundered off Cape Otway with the loss of 26 lives. She was on a voyage from Portland to Melbourne. |
| Clyde | United Kingdom | The steamship was wrecked on the Perroquet Reef, in the Gulf of Saint Lawrence. All on board reached Mingan, Province of Canada, British North America in the ship's boats. She was on a voyage from Quebec City, Province of Canada to Glasgow, Renfrewshire. |
| Hebe | United Kingdom | The schooner was wrecked on the Redcar Rocks, on the coast of Yorkshire. Her crew were rescued. She was on a voyage from Middlesbrough, Yorkshire to Dordrecht, South Holland, Netherlands. |
| Fetteresso Castle | United Kingdom | The ship was damaged by fire whilst on a voyage from Sunderland, County Durham to Fraserburgh, Aberdeenshire. She put in to Peterhead, Aberdeenshire. |
| Rajah | United Kingdom | The ship ran aground on the Diamond Sand, in the Hooghly River. She was on a voyage from London to Calcutta India. |
| Thames | United Kingdom | The ship foundered in the North Sea off Hartlepool, County Durham. Her crew were rescued by Brothers (United Kingdom). |

== 25 August ==
List of shipwrecks: 25 August 1857
| Ship | State | Description |
|---|---|---|
| Elsiena | Netherlands | The koff ran aground in the Emshörn Channel. Her crew were rescued. She was on a voyage from Newcastle upon Tyne, Northumberland, United Kingdom to Papenburg, Kingdom of Hanover. She had been refloated by 30 August and taken in to Delfzijl, Groningen. |
| James | United Kingdom | The sloop was driven ashore on the Boulmer Rocks, on the coast of Northumberland. Her crew survived. She was on a voyage from South Shields to North Sunderland, County Durham. She was refloated on 27 August and taken in to Warkworth, Northumberland. |
| Indian Chief | United States | The 401-ton whaling ship was lost in the Arctic when ice stove in her hull. Her third mate and a lifeboat crew perished. |
| Valetura | Netherlands | The ship sank near Kalundborg, Denmark. Her crew were rescued. Also reported as Velatura sunk near Callantsoog, Groningen. |

== 26 August ==
List of shipwrecks: 26 August 1857
| Ship | State | Description |
|---|---|---|
| Alma | United Kingdom | The steamship was in collision with the steamship Moscow (Bremen) and sank off Seskar, Russia. All on board were rescued by Moscow. Alma was on a voyage from Stettin to Saint Petersburg, Russia. |
| Arno | United Kingdom | The steamship ran aground in the River Mersey. She was on a voyage from Trieste to Liverpool, Lancashire. |
| Hope | United Kingdom | The barque was abandoned in the Atlantic Ocean (46°43′N 10°14′W). Her crew were rescued by the brig Amitie (France). Hope was on a voyage from Cardiff, Glamorgan to the Cape Verde Islands. |
| Lexington | United States | The ship was driven ashore in Brandon Bay. She was on a voyage from New Orleans, Louisiana to Liverpool, Lancashire, United Kingdom. She was refloated on 3 October with assistance from the tug Resolute (United Kingdom). |

== 27 August ==
List of shipwrecks: 27 August 1857
| Ship | State | Description |
|---|---|---|
| Audacious | United Kingdom | The schooner sprang a leak and sank in the Boston Deeps. Her crew were rescued by the schooner Father and Sons (United Kingdom). Audacious was on a voyage from South Shields, County Durham to Great Yarmouth, Norfolk. |
| Don | United Kingdom | The ship was abandoned in the Atlantic Ocean off the Outer Hebrides. Her crew were rescued by Graf (Flag unknown). Don was on a voyage from Hayle, Cornwall to Quebec City, Province of Canada, British North America. |
| Dunairn | United Kingdom | The ship ran aground on the Saltstone Rocks, off the coast of Aberdeenshire, and sank. Her crew were rescued. She was on a voyage from South Shields to the Moray Firth. |
| Gazelle | United Kingdom | The ship was driven ashore and severely damaged near Patras, Greece. She was refloated on 29 August with assistance from HMS Recruit (Royal Navy) and towed in to Patras. |
| Marcia | United Kingdom | The brig ran aground on the Kallboven Rock, off the coast of the Grand Duchy of Finland. She was on a voyage from Saint Petersburg, Russia to Sunderland, County Durham. She was refloated on 30 August and towed in to Helsinki, Grand Duchy of Finland in a waterlogged condition. |
| Marie | France | The ship was driven ashore and wrecked on Skagen, Denmark. She was on a voyage from Cardiff, Glamorgan, United Kingdom to Kronstadt, Russia. |
| Roswell Sprague | United States | The full-rigged ship was driven ashore at Manasquan, New Jersey. She was on a voyage from Cardiff to New York. She was refloated on 4 September and towed in to New York by the tug Achilles (United States). |
| Sister Rebow | United Kingdom | The ship departed from Dominica for London. No further trace, presumed foundered in the Atlantic Ocean with the loss of all hands. |

== 28 August ==
List of shipwrecks: 28 August 1857
| Ship | State | Description |
|---|---|---|
| Carlo Alberto | Kingdom of Sardinia | The barque was driven ashore 8 nautical miles (15 km) north of Barnegat, New Jersey, United States with the loss of three lives. More than 48 people were rescued. She was on a voyage from Genoa to New York, United States. |
| Clara Brookman | United States | The full-rigged ship was driven ashore and wrecked at Manasquan, New Jersey. She was on a voyage from Liverpool, Lancashire, United Kingdom to New York. |
| Godezgen | Netherlands | The fishing boat foundered in the North Sea. Her crew were rescued by the fishing boat Jonge Neeltje (Netherlands). |
| Isabella and William, or William and Isabella | United Kingdom | The brig was run down and sunk in the Dogger Bank by a brig. Her crew took to a skiff, they were rescued by a Dutch fishing vessel. The ship was on a voyage from London to Amsterdam, North Holland, Netherlands. |
| Thomas H. Smith | United States | The pilot boat was driven ashore and wrecked 6 nautical miles (11 km) north of Barnegat, New Jersey. Her crew were rescued. |

== 29 August ==
List of shipwrecks: 29 August 1857
| Ship | State | Description |
|---|---|---|
| Anna | United Kingdom | The barque ran aground on the coast of Jutland off Fjaltring, Denmark. Her crew were rescued. She was on a voyage from Kronstadt, Russia to Stockton-on-Tees, County Durham. Anna had sunk by 28 September. |
| Echo | United States | The ship was wrecked on Acklins Island, Bahamas. She was on a voyage from Gonaïves, Haiti to Boston, Massachusetts. |
| Flora | United Kingdom | The ship was wrecked off Anticosti Island, Nova Scotia, British North America. Her crew were rescued. She was on a voyage from Quebec City, Province of Canada, British North America to Glasgow, Renfrewshire. |

== 30 August ==
List of shipwrecks: 30 August 1857
| Ship | State | Description |
|---|---|---|
| Drake | United Kingdom | The ship ran aground on the Holm Sand, in the North Sea off the coast of Suffolk. She was on a voyage from Dunkirk, Nord to Sunderland, County Durham. She was refloated and resumed her voyage but consequently foundered off the coast of Lincolnshire on 1 September. Her crew were rescued. |
| Tyne | United Kingdom | The steamship broke in two and sank in a squall 20 nautical miles (37 km) west of Saint Vincent. Her crew survived. She was on a voyage from Demerara, British Honduras to Saint Thomas, Virgin Islands. |

== Unknown date ==
List of shipwrecks: Unknown date in August 1857
| Ship | State | Description |
|---|---|---|
| Advance | United Kingdom | The ship was driven ashore. She was refloated and put back to Greenock, Renfrewshire, where she arrived on 18 August. |
| Alice and Ann | United Kingdom | The brigantine was driven ashore and wrecked near "Esteport", Spain. |
| Ann Miller | United Kingdom | The barque was wrecked 10 nautical miles (19 km) north of "Nuzapore", India before 6 August. Her crew were rescued. She was on a voyage from Calingapatnam, India to Liverpool, Lancashire. |
| Bentinck | United Kingdom | The ship was driven ashore at Holyhead, Anglesey before 13 August. |
| Bernadotte | Sweden | The ship ran aground on the Cliff Foot Rock, off Harwich, Essex, United Kingdom. She was on a voyage from Gothenburg, Sweden to Ipswich, Suffolk, United Kingdom. She was refloated and assisted in to Harwich. |
| Burncoose | United Kingdom | The ship collided with the steamship Holyrood (United Kingdom) and sank. She was on a voyage from Rotterdam, South Holland, Netherlands to Gloucester. She was refloated and taken in to Rotterdam, arriving on 19 August |
| Cordelia | United Kingdom | The ship was driven ashore at "Keelingstow", China. She was refloated. |
| Daniel Elliott | United Kingdom | The full-rigged ship capsized at Cardiff, Glamorgan, United Kingdom. She had been righted by 18 August. |
| Florence | United Kingdom | The ship was driven ashore. She was on a voyage from Greenock to Quebec City, Province of Canada, British North America. She was refloated and put back to Greenock, where she arrived on 18 August. |
| Hero | United Kingdom | The ship was driven ashore near Land's End, Cornwall before 18 August and abandoned by her crew. She was later refloated and towed in to Penzance, Cornwall. |
| Hope | United Kingdom | The barque foundered off Cape Finisterre, Spain before 30 August. Her crew were rescued by Amitie (France). |
| Jeannette | United Kingdom | The ship was driven ashore at "Keelingstow". She was refloated. |
| John Murray | United States | The ship was wrecked near Cohasset, Massachusetts before 18 August. |
| Lightning | United Kingdom | The brig was driven ashore at Höganäs, Sweden. She was on a voyage from Newcastle upon Tyne, Northumberland to Helsingør, Denmark. She was refloated and taken in to Helsingør, where she arrived on 2 August. |
| Margaret Jane | United Kingdom | The ship ran aground off Great Yarmouth, Norfolk and capsized. She was on a voyage from South Shields, County Durham to Plymouth, Devon. |
| Marquis of Ely | United Kingdom | The ship ran aground at "Hantoon", County Wexford. |
| Naparina | United Kingdom | The ship ran aground at Exmouth, Devon. She was on a voyage from Quebec City to Exmouth. She was refloated. |
| Nautilus | United Kingdom | The brig was run into by the collier Countess of Durham (United Kingdom) in the River Thames and was beached at Greenwich, Kent. She had been refloated by 18 August. |
| Neander | (United Kingdom of Great Britain and Ireland) British North America | The ship was driven ashore. She was on a voyage from Greenock to Halifax, Nova Scotia. She was refloated and put back to Greenock, where she arrived on 18 August. |
| Prospero | France | The ship was driven ashore near Aigues-Mortes, Gard before 18 August. She was on a voyage from Buenos Aires, Argentina to Marseille, Bouches-du-Rhône. |
| Sarah Ann | United States | The schooner capsized in the Atlantic Ocean (approx 40°16′N 72°50′W). Her crew were presumed to have been rescued. |
| Teresina | Kingdom of the Two Sicilies | The brig ran aground on the Longsand, in the North Sea off the coast of Essex. She was on a voyage from Newcastle upon Tyne to Naples. She was refloated and resumed her voyage, but consequently put in to Dartmouth, Devon on 1 September in a leaky condition. |
| Wakefield | United Kingdom | The ship was abandoned in the North Sea. Her crew were rescued. She was on a voyage from Sunderland to Amsterdam, North Holland, Netherlands. She was subsequently discovered by the fishing boat Jeune Stephanie (Belgium) and towed in to Ostend, West Flanders, Belgium in a derelict condition. |
| Wave | United Kingdom | The schooner ran aground at "Hantoon". She was refloated. |
