= 10th Guards Army =

Soviet military unit

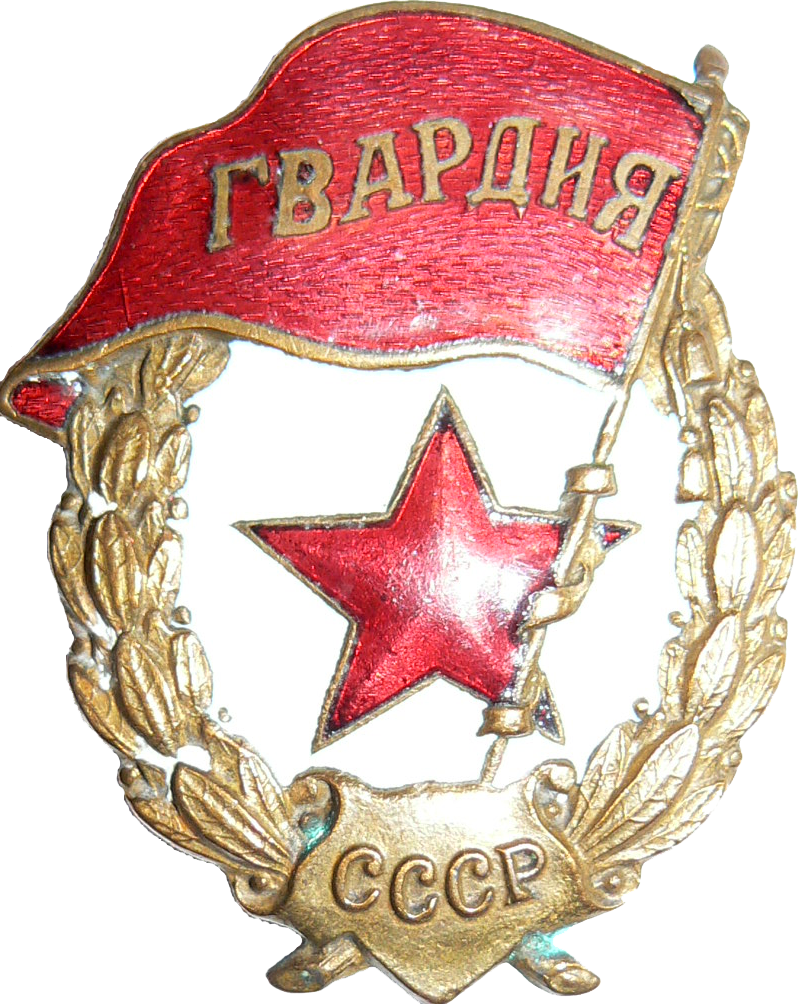
Soviet Guards Order

The 10th Guards Army was a Soviet Guards formation which fought against Germany during World War II under the command of several generals. Formed in 1943, the army fought under various headquarters and ended the war besieging cut-off German forces in Latvia. The 10th Guards Army was disbanded in 1948.

== History ==
The 10th Guards Army was formed on 16 April 1943 from the 30th Army. When formed, the army was located southwest of Vyazma. As of 1 June its main order of battle was as follows:

- 7th Guards Rifle Corps (3rd Guards Motorized Rifle Division; 29th Guards Rifle Division)
- 15th Guards Rifle Corps (30th Guards Rifle Division; 85th Guards Rifle Division)
- 19th Guards Rifle Corps (22nd Guards Rifle Division; 56th Guards Rifle Division; 65th Guards Rifle Division)

It fought under command of the Western, Kalinin, 2nd Baltic, and Leningrad Fronts from then until the end of the war.

The 10th Guards Army had four commanders during the war against Germany:

- Apr–May 1943 Vladimir Kolpakchi
- May–Sep 1943 Kuzma Trubnikov
- Sep 1943 – Jan 1944 Aleksandr Sukhomlin
- Jan 1944 – August 1946 Mikhail Ilyich Kazakov

== Commanders ==
Postwar commanders included:

- August 1946 – 12 May 1947: Colonel General Vasiliy Stepanovich Popov
- May 1947 – April 1948: Colonel General Ivan Ilich Lyudnikov

== Notable battles ==
Notable battles and operations in which the 10th Guards Army participated include:

- Smolensk Offensive Operation
- Leningrad–Novgorod Strategic Offensive
- Riga Offensive

From October 1944, the 10th Guards Army was one of the Soviet formations committed to besieging German Army Group Kurland in the Courland Peninsula. This was a lengthy operation that continued until the Germans in Courland surrendered on May 12, 1945.

== Disbanment ==
At the end of the war in Europe, the 10th Guards Army consisted of the 7th, 15th, and 19th Guards Rifle Corps. The army was disbanded on 30 March 1948 by being renamed 4th Guards Rifle Corps.
