= Otvazhnyy Voin (Arkhangelsk) =

- April 16, 1946 issue of Otvazhnyy Voin
- Native name: Отважный воин
- Type: Daily newspaper
- Founded: 1946
- Ceased publication: 1955
- Political alignment: Communist
- Language: Russian language
- City: Arkhangelsk
- Country: Soviet Union

Otvazhnyy Voin (Russian: Отважный воин, 'Brave Warrior') was a daily newspaper for the Belomorsky Military District published from Arkhangelsk, Soviet Union 1946-1955. Until June 3, 1947 it carried the byline 'Red Army Newspaper for the Arkhangelsk Military District'. From June 4, 1947 to mid-1951 it carried the byline 'Newspaper of the Arkhangelsk Military District'.

Writer Evgeny Kokovin worked at the editorial office of Otvazhnyy Voin from 1946 to 1951.
