= Military districts of the Soviet Union =

Military districts of the Soviet Union, 1989 Baltic Military District Belorussian Military District Carpathian Military District Central Asian Military District Far Eastern Military District Kiev Military District Leningrad Military District Moscow Military District North Caucasus Military District Odessa Military District Siberian Military District Transbaikal Military District Transcaucasian Military District Turkestan Military District Ural Military District Volga Military District

In the Soviet Union, a military district (Russian: вое́нный о́круг, voyenny okrug) was a territorial association of military units, formations, military schools, and various local military administrative establishments known as military commissariats. This territorial division type was utilised in the USSR to provide a more efficient management of army units, their training and other operations activities related to combat readiness.

First military districts in the USSR begun with the formation of the first six military districts (Yaroslavsky, Moskovsky, Orlovsky, Belomorsky, Uralsky, and Privolzhsky) on 31 March 1918 during the Russian Civil War to prepare substantial army reserves for the front.

The next reform did not take place until the economic reforms (NEP) of 1923 which concluded in 1929. At this time the military districts in the Russian Soviet Republic still conformed to the gubernyas and oblasts of the Russian Empire, with the exception of the other republics each of which constituted a military district in their own right.

== Abbreviation of military districts ==
Abbreviation of 17 military districts of the USSR at the beginning July 1940:

- BOVO – Belorussian Special Military District (Russian: БОВО -Белорусский Особый военный округ) (from 11.7.40
  ZapOVO – Western Special military district (Russian: ЗапОВО –Западный Особый военный округ)
- KOVO – Kiev Special Military District (Russian: Киевский Особый военный округ)
- ArkhVO – Arkhangelsk Military District (Russian: АрхВО -Архангельский военный округ)
- ZabVO – Transbaikal Military District (Russian: ЗабВО -Забайкальский военный округ)
- ZakVO – Transcaucasian Military District (Russian: ЗакВО - Закавказский военный округ)
- KalVO – Kalinin Military District (abolished by 11.7.1940) (Russian: КалВО -Калининский военный округ)
- LVO – Leningrad Military District (Russian: ЛВО - Ленинградский военный округ)
- MVO – Moscow Military District (Russian: МВО -Московский военный округ)
- OdVO – Odessa Military District (Russian: ОдВО - Одесский военный округ)
- OrVO – Orel Military District (Russian: ОрВО -Орловский военный округ)
- PribVO – Baltic Military District (Russian: ПрибВО -Прибалтийский военный округ) (formed 11.07.40, from August 17, 1940 renamed into PribOVO - Baltic Special Military District (Russian: ПрибОВО -Прибалтийский Особый военный округ))
- PriVO – Volga Military District (Russian: ПриВО -Приволжский военный округ)
- SAVO – Central Asian Military District (Russian: САВО -Среднеазиатский военный округ)
- SibVO – Siberian Military District (Russian: СибВО -Сибирский военный округ)
- SKVO – North Caucasus Military District (Russian: СКВО -Северо-Кавказский военный округ)
- UrVO – Ural Military District (Russian: УрВО -Уральский военный округ)
- KhVO – Kharkov Military District (Russian: ХВО -Харьковский военный округ)

Formations in the territory of Khabarovsk and Primorsky Krai were combined into the 1st and 2nd independent Red Banner Armies which, after January 14, 1941, were reformed into the Far Eastern Front.

=== World War II ===
The number of military districts varied depending on the circumstances and with the evolution of the Soviet Army. Before the eastern campaign of 1941–45, there were 16 military districts and one front although this number fluctuated and as many as 25 military districts existed at different time before the war.

North and North Western districts

- Arkhangel Military District
- Belomorsky Military District
- Leningrad Military District
- Baltic special military district
- Kalinin Military District

West and Central USSR districts

- Western special military district
- Moscow Military District
- Yaroslavl Military District
- Orel Military District
- Steppe Military District
- Kiev special military district

South and South Western districts

- Ukrainian Military District
- Kharkov Military District created 1919 1st formation, (1935 - 1941), 2nd formation used for formation of the 18th Army, 3rd formation in September 1943, disbanded and amalgamated into the Kiev Military district in June 1946 as the 21st Army
- Odessa Military District
- Tauric Military District created from Separate Coastal Army and 22nd Army on 9 July 1945. Incorporated into Odessa Military District 4 April 1956.
- Trans-Volga Military District (for Trans-Volga Region)
- Transcaucasian Military District
- North Caucasus Military District

Siberian and Central Asian districts

- Volga Military District
- Ural Military District
- Western Siberian Military District
- Siberian Military District
- Central Asian Military District
- Turkestan regional military commissariat

Far Eastern districts

- Eastern Siberian Military District
- Far Eastern Military District
- Transbaikal Military District

Right after the war, the number was increased to 35 to aid in demobilisation of forces, but by October 1946, they had been reduced to 21.

=== Cold War era ===
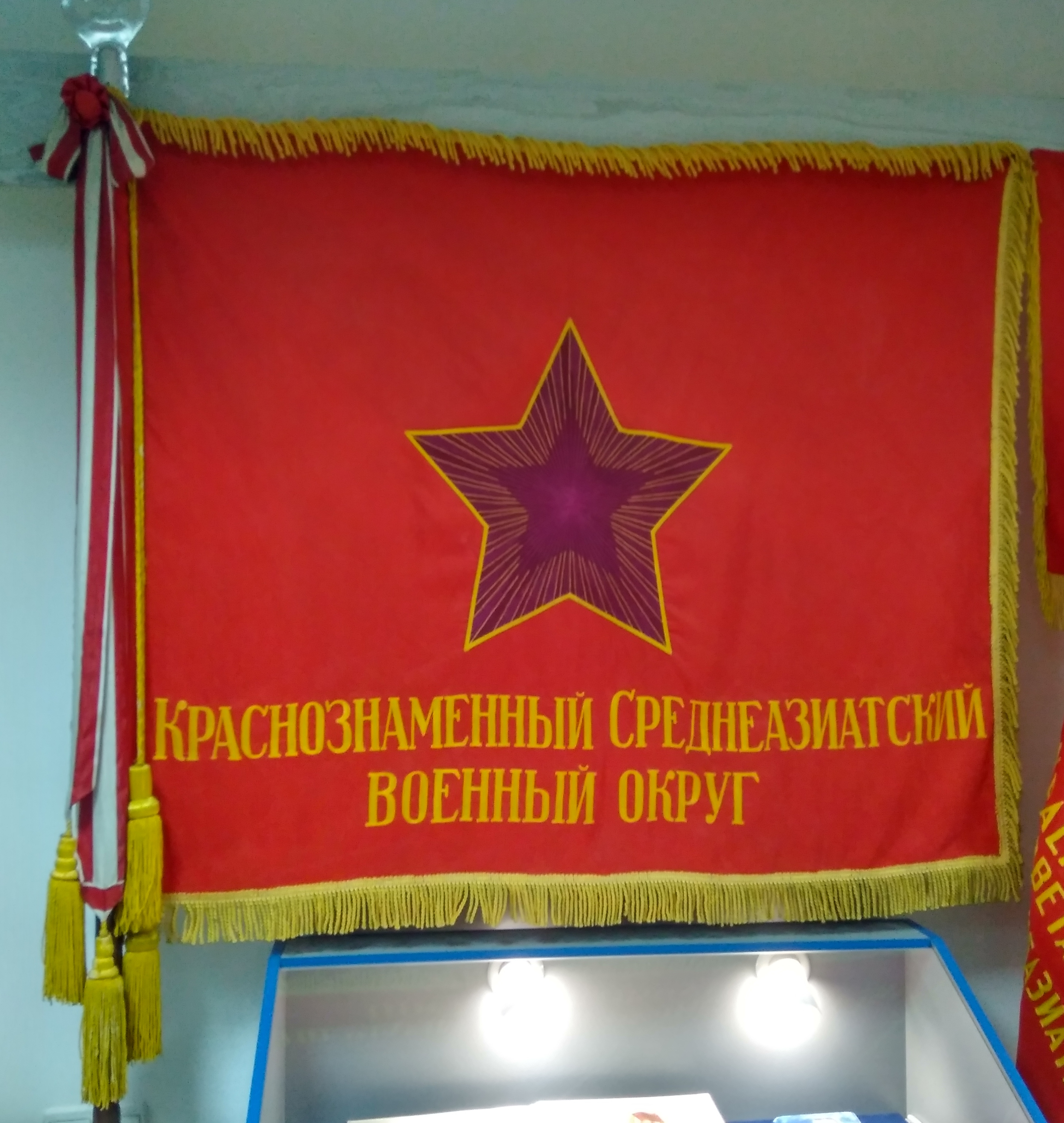
Flag of the Red Banner Central Asian Military District, preserved at the House of Officers in the former Kazakh SSR.

At the end of the 1980s, immediately before the dissolution of the Soviet Union, there were sixteen military districts, within three to five main groupings:

- Western Theatre
  - Western Strategic Direction
    - Group of Soviet Forces in Germany
    - Northern Group of Forces (Poland)
    - Central Group of Forces (Czechoslovakia)
    - Baltic Military District
    - Belorussian Military District
    - Carpathian Military District
  - South-Western Strategic Direction
    - Southern Group of Forces (Hungary)
    - Odessa Military District
    - Kiev Military District
- Northwestern Theatre
  - Leningrad Military District
- Far Eastern Strategic Direction/Theatre
  - Siberian Military District
  - Transbaikal Military District
  - Far Eastern Military District
  - Central Asian Military District
- Southern Theatre
  - Transcaucasian Military District
  - North Caucasus Military District
  - Turkestan Military District
- Central Reserve
  - Moscow Military District
  - Volga Military District
  - Ural Military District
