= Alakurtti =

Alakurtti may refer to:

- Alakurtti (air base), a naval air base in Murmansk Oblast, Russia
- Alakurtti (rural locality), a rural locality (a selo) in Murmansk Oblast, Russia
