= Gerard Vasilyev =

Soviet-Russian singer (born 1935)

Gerard Vasilyev Герард Вячеславович Васильев PAR
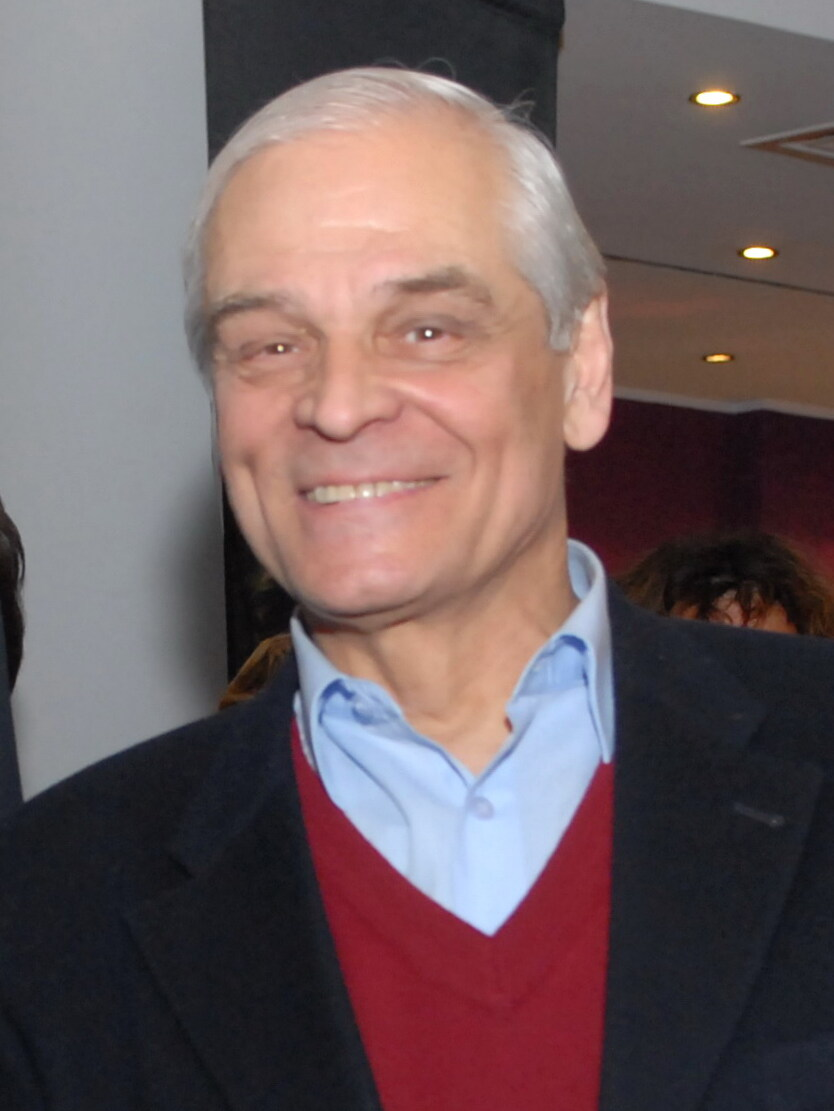

Background information
- Born: Gerard Vyacheslavovich Vasilyev; 24 September 1935 (age 90); Tersko-Orlovsky Mayak, Saami District, Murmansk Okrug, Leningrad Oblast, Russian SFSR, USSR
- Occupation: baritone

Gerard Vyacheslavovich Vasilyev (Russian: Гера́рд Вячесла́вович Васи́льев; born 24 September 1935 in Tersko-Orlovsky Mayak, Leningrad Oblast) is a Soviet and Russian singer and actor, People's Artist of the RSFSR, President of the Foundation for the Conservation and Development of the operetta genre, president of competition for young artists of operetta OperettaLand.

== Biography ==
In 1967, Vasilyev graduated from the Leningrad State Conservatory vocal class and was accepted into the troupe of the Novosibirsk Theatre of Operetta, where for eight months of the six played a major role. In 1968, he was invited as a soloist at the Moscow Operetta Theater, where he works now.

== Roles in movies ==
- 1975 — Maiden Planner as Yuri Tokmokov, clerk
- 1975 — The Count of Luxembourg as Rene von Luxemburg
- 1976 — Silva-Csardas Princess
- 1977 — Espanyola or Lope de Vega suggested...
- 1979 — Hanna ringleaders as Count Danilo

== Awards ==
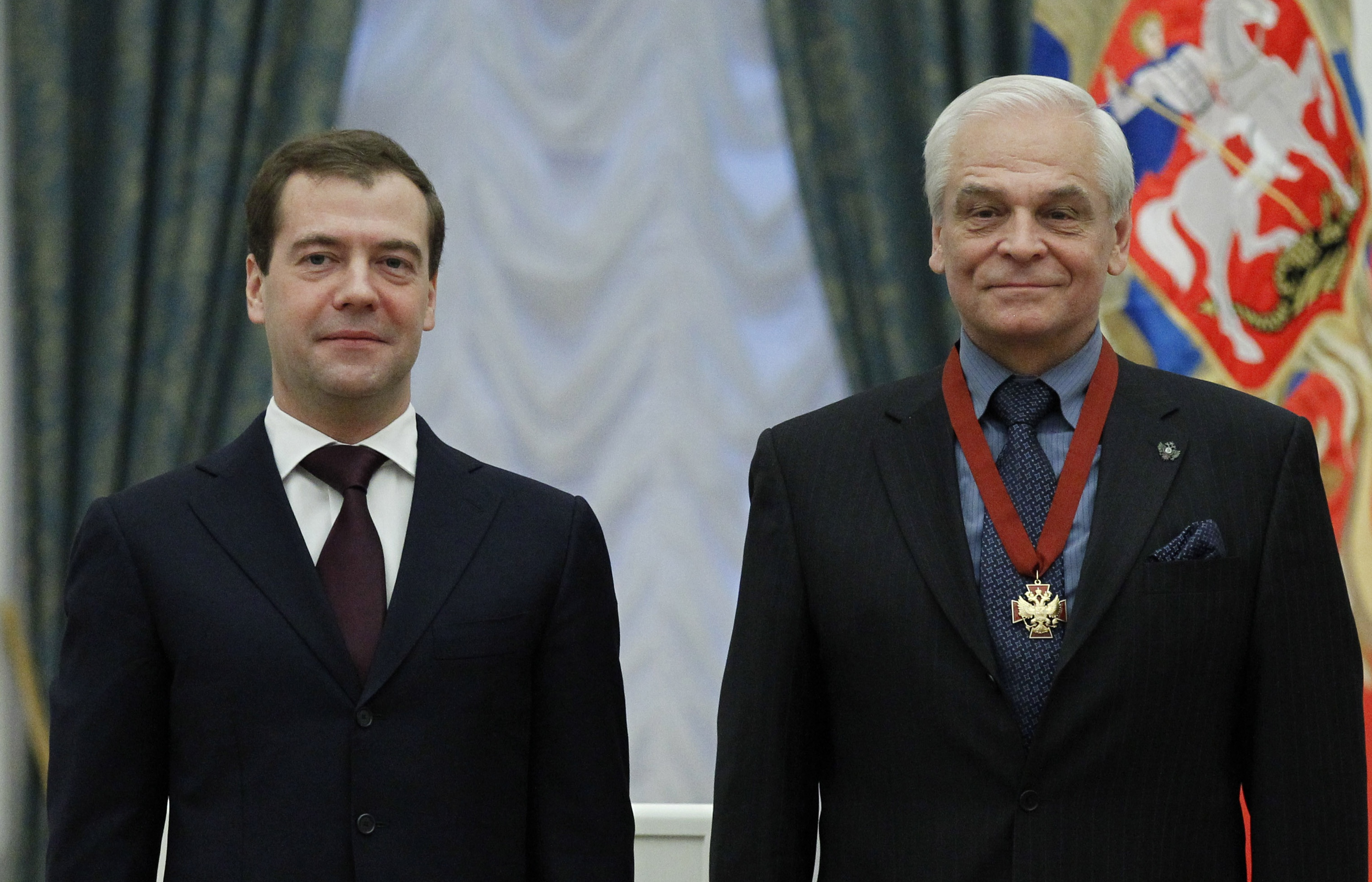
With Dmitry Medvedev on presentation of the Order "For Merit to the Fatherland", 30 December 2010

- Honored Artist of the RSFSR (1974)
- People's Artist of the RSFSR (1981)
- Order of Friendship (1995) — for services to the state, and many years of fruitful work in the field of art and culture
- Order of Honour (2001) — for many years of fruitful work in the field of culture and art, a great contribution to strengthening friendship and cooperation between the peoples
- Medal "For Strengthening Military Cooperation" (2003) — for his merits in strengthening military cooperation, active involvement in the military-patriotic education of youth

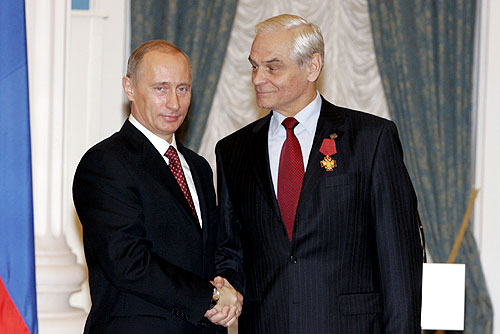
With Vladimir Putin on October 28, 2005

- Order "For Merit to the Fatherland", 3rd class
- Order "For Merit to the Fatherland", 4th class
