= Valerian Frolov =

Soviet general (1895–1961)

Valerian Aleksandrovich Frolov
- Born: 26 May 1895; Saint Petersburg, Russian Empire
- Died: 6 January 1961 (aged 65); Leningrad, Russian SFSR, Soviet Union
- Military career
- Allegiance: Russian Empire (1916-1917); Soviet Russia (1917-1922); Soviet Union (1922-1956)
- Service years: 1916-1956
- Rank: Colonel General
- Commands: 16th Infantry Division; 1st Rifle Corps; 14th Army; Karelian Front; Belomorsky Military District; Arkhangelsk Military District.
- Conflicts: World War II
- Awards: thrice Order of Lenin (see article)

Valerian Aleksandrovich Frolov (Russian: Валериан Александрович Фролов; June 7 (O.S. May 26), 1895 – 1961) was a Soviet Colonel General (1943).

Frolov participated in the First World War and the Russian Civil War. From June 1937 he was commander of the 16th Infantry Division. From October 1937 to September 1938 he participated in the Spanish Civil War. Since January 1939 he was commander of the 1st Rifle Corps of the Leningrad Military Forces.
In October 1939 he became commander of the Murmansk Army Group which was transformed into the 14th Army, at the head of which he participated in the Soviet-Finnish war. The army operated in the Arctic.

At the start of the Second World War in June 1941, he remained the commander of the 14th Army, and from September 1941 to February 1944, of the Karelian Front. After the war from 1945 to 1956 commanded the troops of Belomorsky Military District and Arkhangelsk Military District. From 1956 he was placed in reserve.

== Awards ==
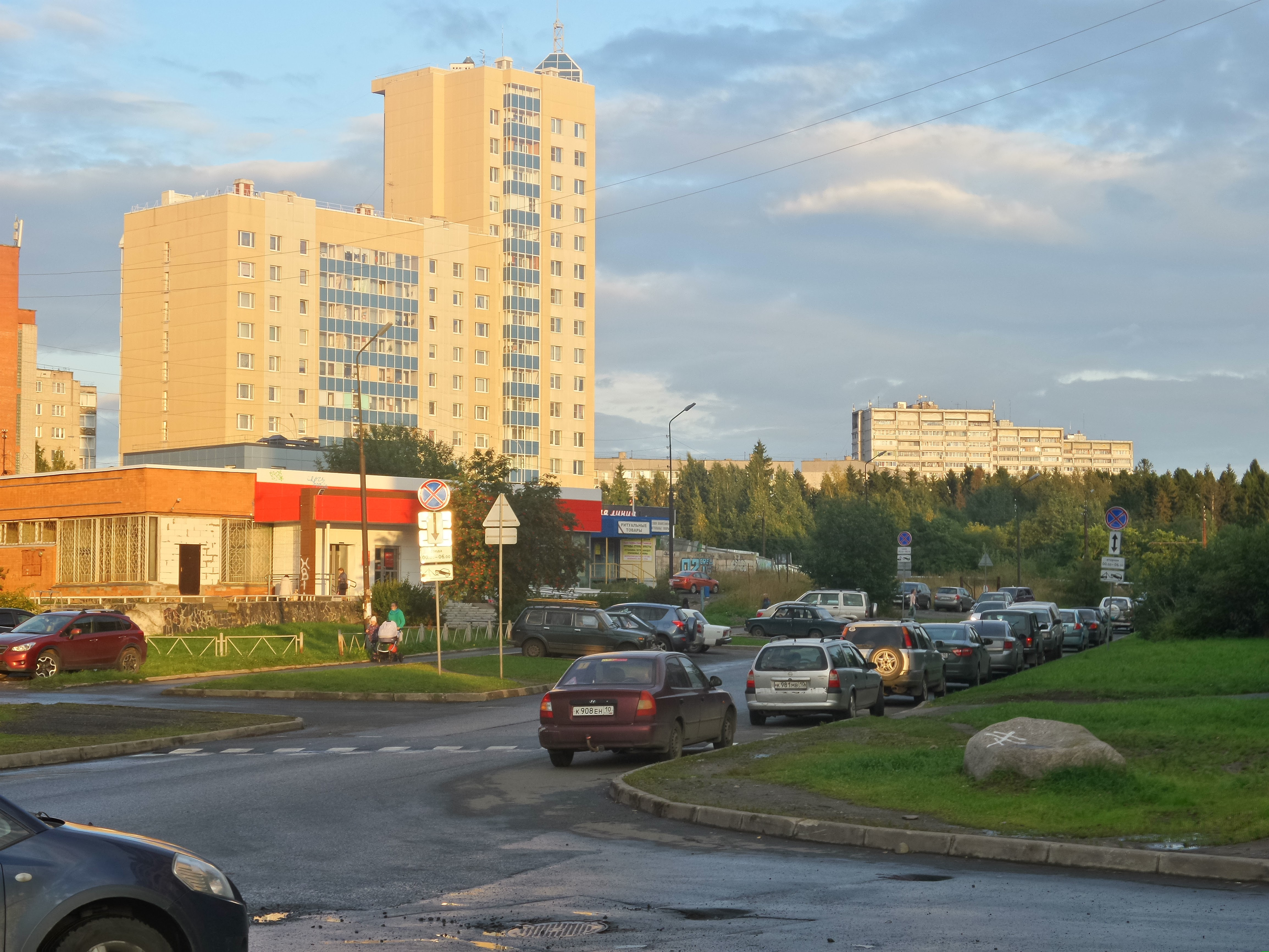
Street of General Frolov at Petrozavodsk. 2017

Valerian Frolov was awarded three Orders of Lenin, four Orders of the Red Banner, Order of Kutuzov (1st class), Order of Bogdan Khmelnitsky (1st Class), Order of the Red Star and numerous medals, including the Medal "For the Victory over Germany in the Great Patriotic War 1941–1945", the Medal "For the Defence of the Soviet Transarctic" and the Jubilee Medal "XX Years of the Workers' and Peasants' Red Army".

A street was named in his honour in the Kukkovka district of the Karelian capital Petrozavodsk.
