= 69th Army =

- 69-я армия
- Active: 1943–1945
- Country: Soviet Union
- Branch: Red Army
- Size: Field army
- Part of: Voronezh Front
- Engagements: World War II: Third Battle of Kharkov; Battle of Kursk; Battle of the Dnieper; Lublin-Brest Offensive; Vistula-Oder Offensive; Berlin Offensive

Commanders
- Notable commanders: Mikhail Kazakov; Vladimir Kolpakchi; Vasily Kryuchenkin

The 69th Army (Russian: 69-я армия) was a field army established by the Soviet Union's Red Army during the Second World War.

== History ==
=== Formation, Operation Star, and Third Battle of Kharkov ===
The army was formed in February 1943 with the Voronezh Front from the 18th Rifle Corps, under the command of Lieutenant General Mikhail Kazakov. It originally included the 161st, 180th and 270th Rifle Divisions, the 1st Destroyer Division (an anti-tank unit), the 37th Rifle and 173rd Tank Brigades, as well as artillery and other units. By the time it was sent into combat, the army had been reinforced with two more rifle divisions and a tank regiment, and had a strength of around 40,000 men and 50 tanks. Without finishing its formation, the army was sent into battle in Operation Star, an offensive which aimed to recapture Kharkov. The offensive began on 4 February and the army experienced initial success, defeating opposing German units southwest of Novy Oskol and recapturing Volchansk alongside the 38th Army on 9 February. Developing the offensive, its troops crossed the Donets, and operating in conjunction with the 3rd Tank Army and the 40th Army, recaptured Kharkov on 16 February. When the offensive was stopped by the German counterattack that began the Third Battle of Kharkov in early March, the 69th had reached the area southeast of Oposhnya and southwest of Valka and Sharovka.

During the Third Battle of Kharkov, the army was able to hold the German attacks for three days but was forced to withdraw back to the left bank of the Donets on the line between Shishino and Bezlyudovka, where the German advance was finally halted. As a result of heavy losses, the 69th was withdrawn to the front reserve on 20 March.

=== Postwar ===
After the end of the war, the army became part of the Group of Soviet Occupation Forces in Germany. Its headquarters was relocated to Baku, where it was used to form the headquarters of the Baku Military District in August.

=== Commanders ===
- Lieutenant General Mikhail Kazakov (02.02.1943 - 22.03.1943)
- Major General Vasily Kryuchenkin (22.03.1943 - 03.04.1944), Lieutenant General since 28.06.1943
- Lieutenant General Vladimir Kolpakchi (03.04.1944 - end of war)
