= Alexander Sukhomlin =

Soviet general

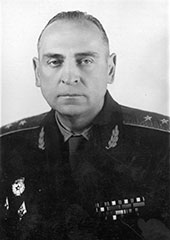
- Born: 5 November [O.S. 23 October] 1900; Krolevetsky Uyezd, Chernigov Governorate, Russian Empire
- Died: 7 October 1970 (aged 69)
- Allegiance: Soviet Russia (1918-1922); Soviet Union (1922-1963)
- Service years: 1918–1963
- Rank: Lieutenant general (1942-1963)
- Commands: 8th Army (1942); 54th Army (1942-1943); 10th Guards Army (1943-1944)
- Conflicts: Russian Civil War; World War II; Battle of Smolensk
- Awards: Order of Lenin; Order of the Red Banner

Alexander Vasilievich Sukhomlin (Russian: Александр Васильевич Сухомлин; 5 November [O.S. 23 October] 1900 – 7 October 1970) was a Soviet military commander, reaching the rank of lieutenant general in the Red Army.

== Biography ==
Sukhomlin was born in a village in the Chernigov Governorate, Russian Empire (now Chernihiv Oblast, Ukraine). He graduated from an industrial school in Irkutsk in 1917 and worked as a metalworker for the local Trans-Baikal Railway station. In 1918 he joined the Red Guards as a machine gunner and helped suppress the Revolt of the Czechoslovak Legion and served on several Soviet steamships on Lake Baikal. He was transferred to the Amur Front after the Empire of Japan and the White movement captured Khabarovsk, located on the Amur River. He later completed the Vystrel course and graduated from the M. V. Frunze Military Academy. He served as head of the faculty's training department at Frunze Military Academy and then as commissioner for the academy's preparatory course from 1931 to 1933. In 1936 he was appointed an assistant army inspector for the Special Red Banner Far Eastern Army. In 1937 he became the course director at the Soviet General Staff Academy after graduating from that institution in October 1936. In February 1941 he was named an assistant professor.

When Operation Barbarossa began in June 1941 Sukhomlin was named deputy chief of staff for the Northwestern Front centered around Leningrad. In September he was chosen as acting chief of staff for the 54th Army, part of the Leningrad Front. In January 1942 he briefly assumed command of the 8th Army on the Volkhov Front before taking command of the 54th Army, recovering from the Soviet loss in the Battle of Lyuban. He led the army in February 1943 during Operation Polar Star, an unsuccessful attempt to lift the blockade of Leningrad. His role was to attack toward Tosno and link up with the 55th Army attacking from Krasny Bor. Sukhomlin was demoted to deputy commander of the army for his failure. In March he was named assistant commander of the Volkhov Front and in June he became chief of staff of the 5th Army on the Western Front.

In August 1943 Sukhomlin became chief of staff of the 10th Guards Army and in September was named its commander. He replaced Kuzma Trubnikov, who was blamed for the early failures of Operation Suvorov, an attempt to liberate Smolensk. Under Sukhomlin the 10th Guards broke through the right flank of the German IX Army Corps of 4th Army west of Yelnya on September 15 and then advanced on Smolensk from the southwest. The troops under his command earned distinction for their performance during the operation.

In February 1944 Sukhomlin became the deputy chief of the Frunze Military Academy. In January 1949 he was appointed head of the military history department and then in December 1953 he was appointed senior lecturer in the Department of Strategy at the K. Е. Voroshilov Higher Military Academy (now the Military Academy of the General Staff of the Armed Forces of Russia). In February 1956 he travelled to the People's Republic of China and served as senior military adviser to the head of the PLA military academy. In May 1959 he was seconded to the Commander-in-Chief of the Soviet Ground Forces and in June he was seconded to the General Staff of the Armed Forces of the Soviet Union for research work. In August 1960 he returned to the General Staff military academy as a senior lecturer in the Department of Strategy. He retired from active service in June 1963.
