= Trifon Shevaldin =

Trifon Ivanovich Shevaldin (Russian: Шевалдин, Трифон Иванович, Pristan, Krasnoufimsky Uyezd, Perm Governorate, 1 February 1888 – Samara, 2 July 1954) was a Soviet Lieutenant-General (1940).

== Biography ==
Shevaldin participated in the First World War and the Russian Civil War.
He joined the Bolshevik Party in 1917. From 1930 until 1934 he was commander of the 33rd Infantry Division. From October 1937 to September 1938 he led the 4th Rifle Corps.
Between January 1939 and July 1940, he was Commander in Chief of the Volga Military District.

At the start of the Second World War in June 1941, he became head of the Leningrad Military District until September when he became commander of the 8th Army. He fought against the German Army in the Leningrad Strategic Defensive Operation, in the area of the cities of Kingisepp, Luga, Pushkin and Kolpino. In heavy defensive battles, the enemy was stopped near the cities of Oranienbaum and Kolpino, creating the very important Oranienbaum Bridgehead. On 28 November 1941, he was relieved of command after a failed counteroffensive.
He spent the rest of the war as commander of the Arkhangelsk Military District, White Sea Military District and Belorussian Military District.

In 1948 he was retired.

== Sources ==
- Generals.dk
- the article in the Russian Wikipedia, Шевалдин, Трифон Иванович.
