= Vladimir Kolpakchi =

Soviet Ukrainian general

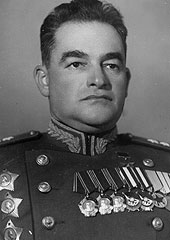
- Born: 7 September 1899; Kiev, Russian Empire
- Died: 17 May 1961 (aged 61) Odessa, USSR
- Allegiance: Soviet Union
- Branch: Red Army
- Service years: 1916–1917; 1917–1961
- Rank: Army General
- Commands: 8th Rifle Division; 12th Rifle Corps; 18th Army; 62nd Army; 30th Army; 63rd Army; 69th Army; Baku Military District; 40th Army; 1st Red Banner Army; 6th Army; Northern Military District
- Conflicts: World War I; February Revolution; October Revolution; Russian Civil War; Basmachi Rebellion; Spanish Civil War; World War II; Battle of Stalingrad; Operation Mars; Battle of Kursk; Vistula-Oder Offensive; Battle of Berlin
- Awards: Hero of the Soviet Union; Order of Suvorov

Vladimir Yakovlevich Kolpakchi (Russian: Владимир Яковлевич Колпакчи, Ukrainian: Володимир Якович Колпакчи; 7 September 1899 in Kiev – 17 May 1961 in Moscow) was a Soviet general during World War II. For his role in the successful Vistula-Oder offensive he was awarded the title Hero of the Soviet Union on 6 April 1945.

He was the first commander of what became the famed Soviet 62nd Army, holding the post between July and August. He also lead the 30th Army between November 1942 and April 1943, Participating in the 1943 Battles of Rzhev, and the 69th Army from April 1944 to May 1945, participating in the Lublin-Brest Offensive and the Vistula-Oder Offensive, and finishing the War at the Battle of Berlin. Following the War, he had also lead the Baku Military District, 1st Red Banner Army and Northern Military Military District, before dying, among other Generals, in a helicopter crash on 17 May 1961.
