= Vladimir Kurdyumov =

Soviet Lieutenant General

Vladimir Nikolayevich Kurdyumov
- Born: 1 October 1895; Novokhopyorsky District, Russian Empire
- Died: 14 February 1970 (aged 74); Moscow, Soviet Union
- Military career
- Allegiance: Russian Empire; Soviet Union
- Branch: Imperial Russian Army; Soviet Red Army
- Service years: 1915 – 1957
- Rank: lieutenant general
- Commands: 25th Rifle Division; 1st Army Corps; 15th Army; Arkhangelsk Military District; South Ural Military District; 66th Army; Siberian Military District
- Conflicts: World War I Russian Civil War; World War II

Vladimir Nikolayevich Kurdyumov (Russian: Влади́мир Никола́евич Курдю́мов 1 October 1895, Ilmen – 14 February 1970) was a Soviet Lieutenant General.

Kurdyumov served in the Red Army since 1918 in World War I and the Russian Civil War. He graduated from the Frunze Military Academy in 1925 and served as military attaché in the Baltic countries. From August 1931 Kurdyumov was a commander and commissar of the 25th Rifle Division.

In 1935 he was made commander and military comissar of the 1st Rifle Corps of the Leningrad Military District.

During the Winter War, Kurdyumov was the Vice Commander of the Southern Group under the 8th Army from December 1939 and later the Vice Commander of the 15th Army. Kurdyumov was appointed as the Commander of the 15th Army on 25 February 1940. He was promoted as Lieutenant General in 1940. Kurdyumov was Red Army Director of Combat Training 1940–41. Later Kurdyumov served as Deputy Commander of Logistics of the Western Front, Deputy Commander of the Caucasian Front and Commander of North Caucasian and Siberia Military Districts in the Second World War.
