= Arkhangelsk Military District =

- Архангельский Военный Округ / Arkhangel'skiy Voyennyy Okrug
- Active: 1940–1944; 1946–1951
- Country: Soviet Union
- Branch: Red Army
- Type: Military District
- Size: 35,515 personnel on mobilisation
- District HQ: Arkhangelsk, Arkhangelsk Oblast
- Engagements: Second World War

Commanders
- Notable commanders: Colonel General Ivan Ivanovich Fedyuninsky

The Arkhangelsk Military District (Russian: Архангельский Военный Округ, romanized: Arkhangel'skiy Voyennyy Okrug) was a regional military district of the Red Army which oversaw the North-Western part of the Russian Soviet Federative Socialist Republic. The district was formed in 1940 during a reorganisation of the Army, but disbanded in 1944, reformed two years later, and finally disbanded in 1951.

== First Formation ==
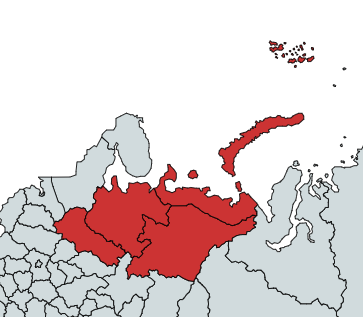
Area of oversight of the Arkhangelsk Military District after 1st Formation in 1940.

In accordance with a decree dated 26 March 1940 from the Council of People's Commissars of the Soviet Union, the Arkhangelsk Military District was formed to oversee the Arkhangelsk Oblast, Murmansk Oblast, Nenets Autonomous Okrug, Vologda Oblast, and Komi Autonomous Soviet Socialist Republic. The new district's headquarters were established in Arkhangelsk on the basis of the 15th Army.

=== Second World War ===
In July 1940 in Vologda the 29th Reserve Brigade was expanded into the 111th Rifle Division.

Sometime before the beginning of War on the Eastern Front, the Murmansk Oblast was transferred to the control of the Leningrad Military District along with the local air defences, air forces, and coastal defences. Personnel reports for 1 June 1941 report the district overseeing around 35,515 personnel.

22 June 1941 District Order of Battle
On 22 June 1941, the order of battle of the district was as follows (note: the Red Air Force was still an integral part of the Army, and not an independent branch. It therefore was under control of the Army):
- Headquarters, Arkhangelsk Military District, in Arkhangelsk, Arkhangelsk Oblast
  - 310th General Headquarters Reserve Gun Artillery Regiment (24 x 122mm M1938 (M-30) howitzers and 12 x 152mm M1937 (ML-20) howitzer guns)
  - 1st General Headquarters Reserve Separate Heavy Gun Battery (2 x 122mm M1938 (M-30) howitzers)
  - 6th General Headquarters Reserve Separate Heavy Gun Battery (2 x 122mm M1938 (M-30) howitzers)
  - District Staff, in Arkhangelsk, Arkhangelsk Oblast
  - 88th Rifle Division, in Arkhangelsk, Arkhangelsk Oblast
    - 221st Signal Battalion
    - 147th Reconnaissance Battalion (1st Coy: 9 x FAI armoured cars, 2nd Coy: 5 x T-38 light tanks, 3rd Coy: 9 x Trucks)
    - 426th Rifle Regiment (3 x battalions)
    - 611th Rifle Regiment (3 x battalions)
    - 758th Rifle Regiment (3 x battalions)
    - 401st Light Artillery Regiment (8 x 76mm M1936 (F-22) division light field guns and 4 x 152mm M1938 (M-10) howitzers)
    - 296th Anti-Tank Battalion (12 x 45mm M1932 (19-K) anti-tank guns)
    - 337th Anti-Aircraft Battalion (8 x 37mm M1939 (61-K) automatic light anti aircraft guns and 4 x 76mm M1938 air defence guns)
    - 222nd Engineer Battalion
    - 184th Supply Battalion
    - 288th Medical Battalion
    - 128th Chemical Defence Company
  - 111th Rifle Division, in Vologda, Vologda Oblast
    - 223rd Signal Battalion
    - 146th Reconnaissance Battalion (1st Coy: 9 x FAI armoured cars, 2nd Coy: 5 x T-38 light tanks, 3rd Coy: 9 x Trucks)
    - 399th Rifle Regiment (3 x battalions)
    - 468th Rifle Regiment (3 x battalions)
    - 532nd Rifle Regiment (3 x battalions)
    - 286th Light Artillery Regiment (8 x 76mm M1936 (F-22) division light field guns and 4 x 152mm M1938 (M-10) howitzers)
    - 561st Howitzer Regiment (12 x 122mm M1938 (M-30) howitzers and 6 x 152mm M1937 (ML-20) howitzer guns)
    - 267th Anti-Tank Battalion (12 x 45mm M1932 (19-K) anti-tank guns)
    - 466th Anti-Aircraft Battalion (8 x 37mm M1939 (61-K) automatic light anti aircraft guns and 4 x 76mm M1938 air defence guns)
    - 181st Engineer Battalion
    - 189th Supply Battalion
    - 120th Medical Battalion
    - 119th Chemical Defence Company
  - Arkhangelsk Air Division, in Arkhangelsk, Arkhangelsk Oblast
    - Commander, Air Forces, Arkhangelsk Military District Major General Boris Andreyevich Pogrebov
    - 1st Mixed Aviation Brigade, in Arkhangelsk, Arkhangelsk Oblast
      - 152nd Fighter Aviation Regiment, split between Kegostrov and Levashovo, Arkhangelsk Oblast (38 x Polikarpov I-16 fighters)
      - 80th Bomber Aviation Regiment, at Yagodnik Airfield, Arkhangelsk Oblast (52 x Tupolev SB fast bombers)
  - Arkhangelsk Air Defence Regional Brigade, in Arkhangelsk, Arkhangelsk Oblast
    - 30th Air Warning Signal Battalion
    - 177th Anti-Aircraft Battalion (8 x 37mm M1939 (61-K) automatic light anti aircraft guns and 4 x 76mm M1938 air defence guns)
    - 213th Anti-Aircraft Battalion (8 x 37mm M1939 (61-K) automatic light anti aircraft guns and 4 x 76mm M1938 air defence guns)
    - 426th Anti-Aircraft Battalion (8 x 37mm M1939 (61-K) automatic light anti aircraft guns and 4 x 76mm M1938 air defence guns)
    - 17th Searchlight Battalion
  - Arkhangelsk District Coastal Defences, at the White Sea Naval Base, Arkhangelsk, Arkhangelsk Oblast (based within, but does not report to the Navy)
    - Battery, in Tersko-Orlovsky, Murmansk Oblast (4 x 152mm M1937 (ML-20) howitzer guns)
    - Battery, in Guba Krasnaya, Murmansk Oblast (4 x 122mm M1938 (M-30) howitzers)
    - Battery, in Voronov, Arkhangelsk Oblast (4 x 152mm M1937 (ML-20) howitzer guns)
    - Battery, in Pylonga, Murmansk Oblast (4 x 152mm M1937 (ML-20) howitzer guns)
    - Battery, in Intsy, Arkhangelsk Oblast (2 x 152mm M1937 (ML-20) howitzer guns)
    - Battery, in Mudyuga, Arkhangelsk Oblast (4 x 152mm M1937 (ML-20) howitzer guns)
    - Battery, in Pertominsk, Arkhangelsk Oblast (4 x 152mm M1937 (ML-20) howitzer guns)
    - Battery, in Krasnogorska, Arkhangelsk Oblast (4 x 152mm M1937 (ML-20) howitzer guns)
    - Battery, in Syuz'ma, Arkhangelsk Oblast (3 x 122mm M1938 (M-30) howitzers)
    - Battery, in Silza, Murmansk Oblast (3 x 122mm M1938 (M-30) howitzers)
    - Battery, in Dickson, Taymyrsky Dolgano-Nenetsky District, Krasnoyarsk Krai (2 x 152mm M1937 (ML-20) howitzer guns)
    - Battery, in Severodvinsk, Arkhangelsk Oblast (4 x 76mm M1936 (F-22) division light field guns)
    - Battery, in Abram, Arkhangelsk Oblast (4 x 76mm M1936 (F-22) division light field guns)
    - Battery, in Solombola, Arkhangelsk Oblast (4 x 76mm M1936 (F-22) division light field guns)
    - Battery, in Ekonomiya, Arkhangelsk Oblast (4 x 45mm M1932 (19-K) anti-tank guns)
    - Battery, in Lapominska, Arkhangelsk Oblast (4 x 12mm M1938 (M-30) howitzers)
    - Battery, on Jagry Island (4 x 152mm M1937 (Ml-20) howitzer guns and 4 x 76mm M1936 (F-22) division light field guns)

On mobilisation the district formed the headquarters of the 28th Army. This army would go on to serve on the front but was completely destroyed trying to relieve the Smolensk Pocket.

The district was also due to form a Front however this order was cancelled at an unknown date.

In October 1941, in accordance with a directive issued by the STAVKA, a new Headquarters, 39th Army was set up in Arkhangelsk from personnel of the district. By February 1942 however this army was completely destroyed in the Kalinin Front.

=== Disbandment ===
On 15 December 1944 as part of a reorganisation of the military districts, the Arkhangelsk Military District was disbanded and subsequently reformed as the White Sea (Belomorsky) Military District. The district was reorganised following end of the "Arctic Front" or Second Soviet-Finnish War, and now included the Arkhangelsk Oblast, Komi Autonomous Soviet Socialist Republic, and Vologda Oblast. Throughout the war the district had been in charge with training reserves, guarding the White Sea coast, and ensuring the safety of the Arctic convoys travelling to Arkhangelsk, in addition to dispatching those supplies. However, following the end of the above-mentioned war, the need for two separate districts was removed. So, eventually, the White Sea District also absorbed the Murmansk Oblast and Karelo-Finnish Soviet Socialist Republic into its area of control.

== Second Formation ==
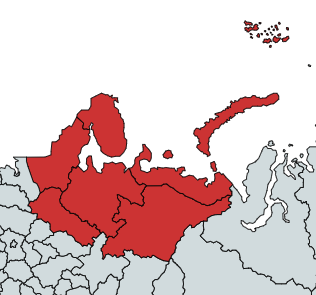
Area of oversight of the Arkhangelsk Military District after 2nd formation in 1946.

Following the end of the Second World War, the military districts were once again reorganised. On 29 January 1946 the first commander of the reformed Arkhangelsk Military District was appointed. The district was reformed by once again redesignating an army headquarters, this time from the 2nd Shock Army.

The district now consisted of the 69th Rifle Division and 77th Guards Rifle Division, both of which arrived back from Poland and East Germany respectively. The district was organized as follows:

- Headquarters, Arkhangelsk Military District, in Arkhangelsk, Arkhangelsk Oblast
  - 69th Rifle Division, in Vologda, Vologda Oblast (reduced to 25th Separate Rifle Brigade in 1941, expanded back to division strength in October 1953)
  - 77th Guards Rifle Division, in Arkhangelsk, Arkhangelsk Oblast (reduced to 10th Guards Separate Rifle Brigade, in 1946, expanded back to division in 1952)

As part of a decree dated 20 June 1951, the Arkhangelsk was finally disbanded when it was redesignated as the White Sea Military District. However, as part of a reform in 1956, which aimed to optimise the military districts, the minor districts were disbanded and reduced to "regional corps" part of a "larger district". Under this reorganisation, HQ White Sea Military District was disbanded and subsequently reformed as HQ, 44th Special Rifle Corps under control of the now expanded Leningrad Military District.

== Commanders ==
Commanders of the district included the following:

First Formation

- 26 March 1940–April 1940, Lieutenant General Vladimir Nikolayevich Kurdyumov
- April 1940–June 1941, Lieutenant General Vladimir Kachalov
- June 1941–March 1942, Lieutenant General Vladimir Zakharovich Romanovsky
- March 1942–15 December 1944, Lieutenant General Trifon Ivanovich Shevaldin

Second Formation

- 29 January 1946–March 1947, Colonel General Ivan Ivanovich Fedyuninsky
- March 1947–May 1949, Lieutenant General Vladimir Ivanovich Shcherbakov
- May 1949–June 1951, Colonel General Valerian Aleksandrovich Frolov
