= Belomorsky Military District =

- Active: 1918; 1920-1921; 1944-1951; 1951-1956
- Country: Soviet Union
- Type: Military district

Commanders
- Notable commanders: Kirill Meretskov

The Belomorsky Military District (Russian: Беломорский военный округ) was a military district of the Soviet Armed Forces, active from in the immediate aftermath of the Russian Civil War and just after the Second World War.

The District was formed by the decree of the Council of the Peoples Commissars in May 1918. It existed: from May 4 to August 15, 1918; from March 20, 1920, to May 17, 1921; from 15 December 1944 year (note 1 January 1945 according to the Encyclopedia "Second World War") to June 29, 1951.

== First Formation ==
Formed on 4 May 1918 initially the Belomorsky Military District included the territories of the Arkhangelsk, Vologda, and Olonets districts, the islands of the White Sea and part of the islands of the Arctic Ocean. The headquarters was initially located in Arkhangelsk. After the North Russia Intervention by Western Forces in 1918. The district was abolished and the territory was transferred to the Yaroslavl, Ural and Petrograd military districts.

== Second Formation ==
Reformed on 20 March 1920 after the Western military's and White Guards defeat it included the Arkhangelsk, Volgdo, North-Divinsky and Murmansk regions. The district headquarters was located in Arkhangelsk. Disbanded on 17 May 1921, the troops and territory were transferred to the Moscow and Ural Military Districts.

Command of the Military District was located in Arkhangelsk, and later in Vologda, Kem' and Petrozavodsk.

== Third Formation ==
On 15 December 1944, the Belomorsky Military District was reestablished from the Arkhangelsk Military District by order of the People's Commissar of Defence. The territory of the Military District included Arkhangelsk, Vologda, Murmansk, Karelo-Finnish Soviet Socialist Republic and the Komi ASSR; its headquarters were established at Kem'. Included in the military district was the 14th Army and a number of separate formations and units. The Military District was tasked with defending the northern borders of the USSR.

Simultaneously the Belomorsky Military District executed formation and preparation of reserve formations and units for the active army. Just after the war, the district included under its command the 4th Rifle Corps (Arkhangelsk) (25th and 289th Rifle Divisions); 31st Rifle Corps (Murmansk) (45th, 67th, and 83rd (both the last located at Murmansk)) and the 131st Rifle Corps (Petrozavodsk) (114th, 341st, and 367th Rifle Divisions, Rebol, Alakurtti, and Sortavala). By 1946 the 83rd and 114th Rifle Divisions had been disbanded.

It was reorganized after the war. In January 1946 HQ 2nd Shock Army arrived and took over the Arkhangelsk Oblast, Vologda Oblast, Komi Autonomous Soviet Socialist Republic and Nenets Autonomous Okrug from the Belomorsky Military District, becoming the Arkhangelsk Military District.

The Northern Military District was established from the Belomorsky Military District in June 1951, with its headquarters at Petrozavodsk. Its territory included the Karelo-Finnish SSR, the Murmansk Oblast, and the Pechenga district of the RSFSR. Military District Commanders included 06.1951-05.1954 Měreckov, Kirill Afanasjevič, 05.1954-01.1956 Kolpakči, Vladimir Yakovlevich, 01.1956-03.1960 Stučenko, Andrew Trofimovic. From June 1951 to April 1952 it also included 31st Rifle Corps.

16th Guards Fighter Aviation Division was part of VVS Belomorsky Military District from November 1944 until January 1952, and then became part of 22nd Air Army, seemingly Northern Military District's aviation component, from 25 January 1952 until October 1953. In 1949 the division included two fighter regiments of Bell P-39 Airacobras, the 19th Guards at lakurtti, and the 773rd possibly stationed at Monchegorsk. The 20th Guards Fighter Aviation Regiment, the third regiment of the division, was also possibly stationed at Monchegorsk, and equipped with the Yak-9.

In March 1960 the Northern Military District was disbanded and its territory transferred to the Leningrad Military District, except for the Komi ASSR, which became part of the Urals Military District. On 23 July, the district headquarters became the 6th Army headquarters.

== Fourth Formation ==
On 1 July 1951 the Arkhangelsk Military District was renamed the Belomorsky Military District with headquarters at Arkhangelsk. The new Belomorsky Military District controlled troops in the territory of Arkhangelsk Oblast, Vologda Oblast, the Komi Autonomous Soviet Socialist Republic and the Nenets Autonomous Okrug. In April 1956 it was disbanded and headquarters became 44th Special Rifle Corps.

== Commanding officers ==
- Ogorodnikov Fedor Evlampievich (26 May 1918 - 15 August 1918)
- Kraevskiy Bronislaw Ignatevich (9 April 1920 - 27 August 1920)
- Dudnikov (28 August 1920 - 18 September 1920)
- Shipov M. (19 September 1920 - 10 November 1920)
- Natsarenus Sergey Petrovich (November 1920 - April 1921)
- Shevaldin Trifon Ivanovich (1944–1945)
- Colonel General Valerian Alexandrovich Frolov (15 December 1944 - April 1948)
- Colonel General Mikhail Stepanovich Shumilov (1948–1949)
- Kirill Meretskov (1949 - 29 June 1951)
- Colonel General V A Frolov (29 June 1951 – 4 April 1956)

== Sources and references ==
- Feskov, V.I.; Golikov, V.I.; Kalashnikov, K.A.; Slugin, S.A. (2013). Вооруженные силы СССР после Второй Мировой войны: от Красной Армии к Советской [The Armed Forces of the USSR after World War II: From the Red Army to the Soviet] (in Russian). Vol. 1 Land Forces. Tomsk: Tomsk University Press. ISBN 9785895035306.
- Source is translation of http://samsv.narod.ru/Okr/bmvo.html
- History of the Red Sixth Army
- See also https://web.archive.org/web/20101019235144/http://bdsa.ru/index.php?option=com_content&task=view&id=736&Itemid=30
