= Kuzma Trubnikov =

Soviet military commander

- Born: 27 October 1888; Oryol Governorate, Russian Empire
- Died: 16 January 1974 (aged 85) Moscow, Russian SFSR, Soviet Union
- Allegiance: Russian Empire (1915–1918); Soviet Russia (1909–1918); Soviet Union (1918–1951)
- Service years: 1918–1951
- Rank: Colonel-General (1945–1951)
- Commands: 25th Rifle Division (1935–8); 258th Rifle Division (1941); 217th Rifle Division (1941–2); 10th Guards Army (1943)
- Conflicts: World War I; Russian Civil War; World War II; Roslavl–Novozybkov Offensive; Battle of Bryansk; Battle of Moscow; Battles of Rzhev; Battle of Stalingrad; Battle of Smolensk; East Prussian Offensive; East Pomeranian Offensive; Battle of Berlin
- Awards: Cross of St. George; Order of Saint Anna; Order of Lenin; Order of the Red Banner

Kuzma Petrovich Trubnikov (Russian: Кузьма́ Петро́вич Тру́бников; 27 October 1888 – 16 January 1974) was a Soviet military commander, reaching the rank of colonel-general in the Red Army.

== Early life, World War I, and Russian Civil War ==
Trubnikov was born in a small village in Oryol Governorate, Russian Empire (now Volovsky District, Lipetsk Oblast, Russia). Conscripted for military service, he joined the Semyonovsky Regiment in November 1909 and soon rose up the non-commissioned ranks during World War I. In December 1914 he was promoted to master sergeant for distinction in battle. In 1915 he graduated as a warrant officer after completing studies in Omsk. He served on the Southwestern Front and participated in the Brusilov Offensive. In January 1918 he was seconded to the headquarters of the prestigious 1st Guards Corps. He received all four classes of the Cross of St. George (earning the title "Full Cavalier of Saint George") as well as the Order of Saint Anna, 4th class. In early 1918 Trubnikov was demobilized having reached the rank of lieutenant.

Volunteering for the Red Army at the outset of the Russian Civil War, Trubnikov was first appointed as a military officer for his hometown. In May 1919 he was sent to the front, commanding a platoon, a company, and then a battalion in the 28th Rifle Regiment of the 7th Rifle Division. He fought on the Eastern Front against the White Army troops of Alexander Kolchak in the Votkinsk and Izhevsk districts, but in the summer the regiment was urgently transferred to the Southern Front, where Anton Denikin was advancing on Moscow. In August he became deputy commander and then commander of the 55th Rifle Regiment, also of the 7th Division, and fought in battles around Oboyan and Sudzha. From October to November he was involved in the Orel–Kursk operation, a decisive Soviet victory in which the Red Army regained the initiative. During the Polish–Soviet War he commanded a regiment and then the 20th and 19th brigades of the 7th Division. In the autumn of 1920 he fought against Stanisław Bułak-Bałachowicz near Ovruch and then against the anarchist army of Nestor Makhno near Zolotonosha.

== Interwar period ==
After the civil war he continued to serve in the 7th Rifle Division as commander of the 19th Rifle Regiment, stationed in the Kiev Military District. In 1925 he completed the Vystrel course as part of his officer training and in 1927 he graduated from the Frunze Military Academy. In November 1928 he was appointed assistant commander of the 15th Rifle Division. In August 1932 he became the inspector of the 5th Aviation Brigade and in September 1933 he became the head of the sector for the Soviet Air Forces. In February 1934 he became the assistant commander of the 25th Chapayev Rifle Division, named after its first commander, Vasily Chapayev. In 1935 he became the division commander.

During this time Trubnikov was under investigation by the NKVD, the Soviet secret police. This investigation was during a widespread purge of the Red Army, part of the Great Purge, where officers of the former Imperial army especially came under suspicion. He was arrested in June 1938 but released in February 1940. After his release he served as an instructor at the Vystrel course.

== World War II ==
A month after Operation Barbarossa began Trubnikov was given command of the 258th Rifle Division, hastily formed in the Orel Military District. In August 1941 the division was assigned to the 50th Army, part of the newly-forming Bryansk Front. The unit saw action in the Roslavl–Novozybkov Offensive and the Battle of Bryansk from September to October. During the Battle of Moscow the army was encircled by the attacking 17th Panzer Division and 167th Infantry Division, but the 258th Division was able to escape and prevent the complete destruction of the army. The division then helped stop Guderian's Second Panzer Army at Tula, on the southern flank of the German assault on Moscow. After the successful defensive operation the original strength of the 258th Infantry Division was less than 10 percent. In November Trubnikov was assigned command of the 217th Rifle Division, also part of 50th Army.

In January 1942 Trubnikov led the division in the Soviet counteroffensive in the Moscow area, helping to liberate Kaluga and participating in the bloody Battles of Rzhev, known as the "Rzhev Meat Grinder" ("Ржевская мясорубка"). In June 1942 he became deputy commander of the 16th Army under Konstantin Rokossovsky. In July Rokossovsky was promoted to command the Bryansk Front, as it was expected the Wehrmacht would once more attack Moscow. When it became clear that the German focus was on the Southern Front, Soviet leader Joseph Stalin transferred Rokossovsky to the Don Front in preparation for a planned Soviet counterattack at Stalingrad. In October, at Rokossovsky's request, Trubnikov became deputy commander of the Don Front. He participated in the organization and management of troops in the Battle of Stalingrad and the destruction of the encircled German 6th Army. Trubnikov led the armies on the Don Front's right wing, including the 57th, 67th and 64th armies.

In February 1943 Trubnikov again served as deputy commander to Rokossovsky on the Central Front in preparation for a summer offensive aimed at a German salient around the city of Kursk. In April Trubnikov received command of the 10th Guards Army of the Western Front. He led the army during Operation Suvorov, an attempt to liberate Smolensk that summer. In early August Trubnikov's army tried several times to break through the German XII Army Corps, but reinforcements from the 9th Army prevented any advance. During the first phase of the operation the 10th Guards suffered 30 percent casualties and its most elite unit, the 65th Guards Rifle Division, was almost annihilated, having lost 75 percent of its personnel in just seven days. On September 10 Trubnikov was relieved of command and replaced with Alexander Sukhomlin. He would hold no more major commands for the rest of the war.

In December 1943 he was appointed assistant commander of the 1st Belorussian Front under his old comrade Rokossovsky, following him to the 2nd Belorussian Front in 1944 during the Soviet advance through Belorussia (Belarus) and into Poland. In this position he participated in the East Prussian Offensive, the East Pomeranian Offensive, and the Battle of Berlin.

== Later life ==
At the Moscow Victory Parade of 1945 Trubnikov led the consolidated regiment of the 2nd Belorussian Front. After the war, he continued as deputy commander of the troops of the 2nd Belorussian Front until August 1945, when he became deputy commander-in-chief of the Northern Group of Forces stationed in Poland. In January 1951 he was retired due to illness. He died on January 16, 1974, and is buried in the Vvedenskoye Cemetery in Moscow.

== Awards and decorations ==
Russian Empire

Cross of St. George, all four-classes (Full Cavalier)
Order of Saint Anna, 4th class
George Medal, all four classes (Full Cavalier)
Medal "In Commemoration of the 100th Anniversary of the Patriotic War of 1812"
Medal "In Commemoration of the 300th Anniversary of the Reign of the House of Romanov"
Medal "In Commemoration of the 200th Anniversary of the Naval Battle of Gangut"

Soviet Union

Order of Lenin, twice (21 February 1945, 29 May 1945)
Order of the Red Banner, five times (1921, 2 January 1942, 4 February 1943, 3 November 1944, 20 June 1949)
Order of Kutuzov, 1st class (10 April 1945)
Order of Suvorov, 2nd class (23 August 1944)
Order of Kutuzov, 2nd class (28 September 1943)
Order of the Red Star (22 February 1938)
Medal "For the Defence of Stalingrad" (22 December 1942)
Medal "For the Defence of Moscow" (1 May 1944)
Medal "For the Capture of Königsberg" (9 June 1945)
Medal "For the Liberation of Warsaw" (9 June 1945)
Medal "For the Victory over Germany in the Great Patriotic War 1941–1945" (9 May 1945)
Jubilee Medal "Twenty Years of Victory in the Great Patriotic War 1941-1945" (7 May 1965)
Jubilee Medal "In Commemoration of the 100th Anniversary of the Birth of Vladimir Ilyich Lenin" (5 November 1969)
Jubilee Medal "XX Years of the Workers' and Peasants' Red Army" (22 February 1938)
Jubilee Medal "30 Years of the Soviet Army and Navy" (22 February 1948)
Jubilee Medal "40 Years of the Armed Forces of the USSR" (18 December 1957)
Jubilee Medal "50 Years of the Armed Forces of the USSR" (22 December 1967)
Medal "In Commemoration of the 800th Anniversary of Moscow" (30 September 1947)

Foreign

Croix de guerre (Belgium)
Médaille militaire (France)
Commander's Cross of the Virtuti Militari (Poland)
Order of the Cross of Grunwald, 2nd class (Poland)
Medal "For Oder, Neisse and the Baltic" (Poland)
Medal "For Warsaw 1939-1945" (Poland)
Medal of Victory and Freedom 1945 (Poland)

=== Other honors ===
- Honorary weapons from the Revolutionary Military Council (1921 and 1922), Poltava Provincial Military Conference (1922) and Konstantinogradsky Uyezd Executive Committee (1922).
- Honorary diploma of the All-Ukrainian Central Executive Committee (1926)
- Gold watch from the People's Commissariat of Defense of the Soviet Union (1936)
- On 9 May 2010, a monument honoring Trubnikov was unveiled in the village of Volovo in Lipetsk Oblast, Russia
