= Tersko-Orlovsky Mayak =

Tersko-Orlovsky Mayak Терско-Орловский Маяк
- Inhabited locality
- Interactive map of Tersko-Orlovsky Mayak
- Location of Tersko-Orlovsky Mayak Tersko-Orlovsky Mayak (Murmansk Oblast)
- Coordinates: 67°11′57″N 41°19′39″E
- Country: Russia
- Federal subject: Murmansk Oblast
- Elevation: 18 m (59 ft)

Population (2010 Census)
  - Total: 9
  - Estimate (2021): 0 (−100%)

Administrative status
  - Subordinated to: closed administrative-territorial formation of Ostrovnoy

Municipal status
  - Urban okrug: Ostrovnoy Urban Okrug
- Time zone: UTC+3 (MSK)
- Postal code: 184640
- Dialing code: +7 81558
- OKTMO ID: 47731000136

Tersko-Orlovsky Mayak (Russian: Терско-Орловский Маяк) is a rural locality (an inhabited locality) in administrative jurisdiction of the closed administrative-territorial formation of Ostrovnoy in Murmansk Oblast, Russia, located on the Kola Peninsula, beyond the Arctic Circle, at an elevation of 18 meters (59 ft) above sea level. As of the 2010 Census, its population was 9.

== Etymology ==
The locality gets its name from the nearby Tersko-Orlovsky Lighthouse.

== Notable people ==
- Gerard Vasilyev (born 1935), singer and actor
