= Alakurtti (air base) =

Defunct Russian Naval air base

Alakurtti
- Alakurtti, Murmansk Oblast in Russia

Site information
- Type: Air Base
- Owner: Ministry of Defence
- Operator: Russian Navy

Location
- Shown within Murmansk Oblast Alakurtti (Russia)
- Coordinates: 66°58′24″N 030°20′42″E

Site history
- Built: 1940
- In use: 1940 - 2014

Airfield information
- Elevation: 164 metres (538 ft) AMSL
Runways
Direction	Length and surface
12/30	2,500 metres (8,202 ft) Concrete

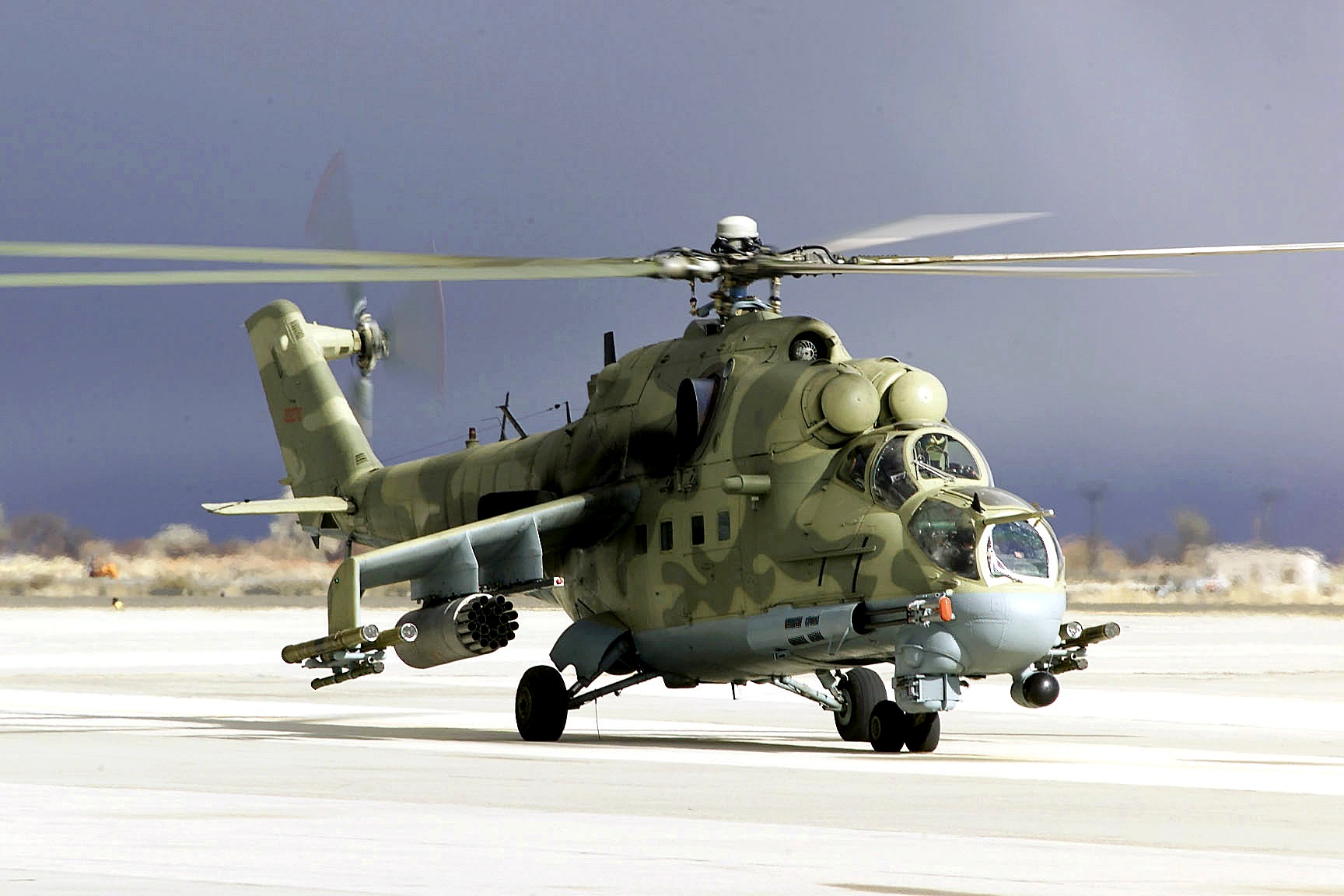

Alakurtti Air Base is a former naval air base in Murmansk Oblast, Russia located 3 km northwest of Alakurtti. It was serviced by the 4th Naval Bomber Regiment (Sukhoi Su-24) and 485 OVP (485th Independent Helicopter Regiment) flying (Mil Mi-24 and Mil Mi-8).

== History ==
=== World War II ===
The construction of the airfield in the then Finnish village of Alakurtti began shortly before the start of World War II. After the Winter War ended on 13 March 1940, the village was ceded to the Soviet Union. The airfield and village were captured by the 6th Infantry Division of the Finnish Army and the 169th Mountain Infantry Division of the Wehrmacht in August 1941. Before the Soviet recapture on September 14, 1944, the military airfield played an important role for Germany: it carried out raids on Kandalaksha and the Kirov Railway. After unsuccessful attempts of the German troops to capture Murmansk, the fighting moved to the south and the airfield received German airplanes.

Throughout the war, the airfield was subjected to repeated bombardments by Soviet pilots. The 195th IAP, the 101st NKVD Stand, the 668th NBAP, the 828th SHAP and others participated in the battles for the airfield. On March 10, 1943, the 828th Ground Attack Aviation Svirsky Order of Suvorov Regiment, with 8 Il-2 aircraft under the command of Lieutenant Nikolai Kukushkin, made an attack on the airbase. More than 40 aircraft were destroyed during the attack, a fuel depot was blown up, and many airfield buildings were burned.

After Finland ceeded the Area again 1944, the 415th Fighter Aviation Regiment was based at the airfield, performing tasks during the Petsamo-Kirkenes operation.

=== Cold War ===
In the 1950s Alakurtti was being monitored by the US intelligence community for development into a strategic bomber base capable of reaching the US, but Soviet Long Range Aviation began developing nearby Olenya air base instead. The airfield then took on an air defense role in the 1950s, hosting a fighter division of the 22nd Air Army, subordinate to an air defense center at Severomorsk.

As Alakurtti is only 50 km (30 miles) from the border with Finland, a significant Army presence has existed since the Cold War era. The 85th Separate Helicopter Squadron of the 6th Army Air Force and Air Defense operated Mi-8 and Mi-24 helicopters. In the 1980s Alakurtti hosted a Mi-8PP (Hip-K) helicopter regiment specializing in electronic jamming. A tank/assault gun firing range is also located about 5 km (3 miles) north of the airfield. The helicopter squadron was disbanded in December 2009 and its assets moved to Monchegorsk.

The former camp of the 54th Motor Rifle Division was reoccupied by a new arctic motor rifle brigade from January 2015. Reports indicate that Russia reopened the military base as a garrison of 3,000 radioelectronics experts. In 2015, ITAR-TASS reported (through an English language Finnish news service) that motorized infantry brigade is stationed at this base. Russian newspapers reported that brigades at this base would eventually grow to 7,000 soldiers.
