= Stepanov =

Stepanov (Cyrillic: Степанов), female Stepanova is a common Russian and Serbian surname that is derived from the male given name Stepan and literally means Stepan's. The Latvianized form is Stepanovs. Notable people with the surname include:

- Aleksandr Stepanov (disambiguation), several people
- Alexandra Stepanova (born 1995), Russian ice dancer
- Aleksandra Stepanova (handballer) (born 1989), Russian handball player
- Aleksei Stepanov (born 1977), Russian association football player
- Alexander Stepanov, designer of the C++ Standard Template Library
- Alexei Stepanov (1858–1923), Russian painter
- Andrei Stepanov (footballer) (born 1979), Estonian association football player
- Galina Stepanova (rower) (born 1958), Russian Olympic rower
- Galina Stepanova-Prozumenshchykova (1948–2015), Russian swimmer
- Georgy Stepanov (1890-1953), Soviet naval officer
- Igors Stepanovs, Latvian association football player
- Ilona Štěpánová-Kurzová (1899–1975), Czech pianist and professor
- Inna Stepanova (born 1990), Russian archer
- Konstantin Stepanov (1922–1999), Soviet army officer and Hero of the Soviet Union
- Larisa Stepanova (born 1968), Russian teacher and politician
- Maria Stepanova (born 1979), Russian basketball player
- Marina Stepanova (born 1950), Russian hurdler
- Milan Stepanov, Serbian association football player
- Nadezhda Stepanova (born 1959), Russian long-distance runner
- Nikolai Stepanov (1807–1877), Russian caricaturist and editor
- Oleg Stepanov (judoka), Soviet judoka
- Olga Stepanova, Russian sport shooter
- Onufriy Stepanov, an explorer of the Russian Far East
- Sergei Stepanov (disambiguation), several people
- Tatiana Stepanova (born 1962), Ukrainian ballet expert
- Tatiana Stepanova (ballerina), Ukrainian ballerina
- Varvara Stepanova (1894–1958), Russian avant-garde artist
- Vasilijs Stepanovs, Latvian weightlifter
- Vasiliy Stepanov (disambiguation), multiple people
- Veronika Stepanova (born 2001), Russian cross-country skier
- Vladimir Ivanovich Stepanov, Russian dancer
- Vladimir Stepanov (disambiguation), multiple people
- Vyacheslav Stepanov, Russian mathematician
- Yuliya Stepanova (born 1962), Russian cross-country skier
- Yuliya Stepanova (born 1986), Russian athlete

== Fictional characters ==
- Stepan Stepanov, or Uncle Styopa
