= Aleksandr Stepanov =

Aleksandr Stepanov may refer to:

== Sportspeople ==
- Aleksandr Stepanov (footballer, born 1981), Russian football defender
- Oleksandr Stepanov (born 1983), Ukrainian footballer
- Aleksandr Stepanov (footballer, born 1996), Russian football defender
- Alexander Stepanov (ice hockey) (born 1979), Russian ice hockey player
- Alexander Stepanov (figure skater) (born 1991), Russian-Belarusian pair skater
- Alexander Stepanov (runner) (born 2004), German athlete

== Other people ==
- Aleksandr Stepanov (general) (1893–1941), Soviet general
- Alexander Stepanov (physicist) (1908–1972), Soviet material scientist
- Alexander Stepanov (born 1950), Russian American programmer
