= Overtime (ice hockey) =

Additional ice hockey period to break ties

Overtime is a method of determining a winner in an ice hockey game when the score is tied after regulation. The main methods of determining a winner in a tied game are the overtime period (commonly referred to as overtime), the shootout, or a combination of both. If league rules dictate a finite time in which overtime may be played, with no penalty shoot-out to follow, the game's winning team may or may not be necessarily determined.

== Overtime periods ==
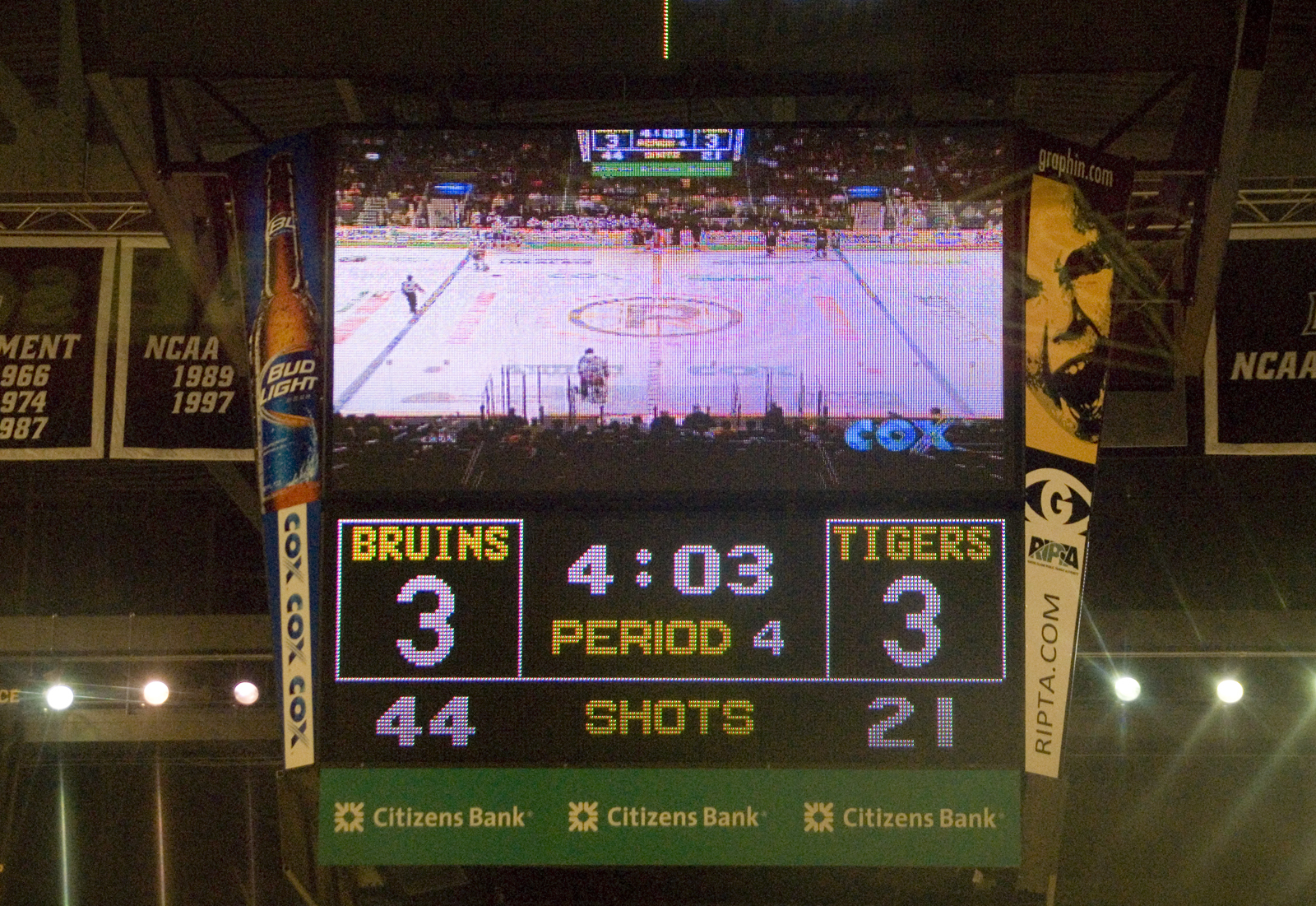
A scoreboard showing an overtime period. Since there are typically three periods in hockey, the fourth period is the overtime period.

Overtime periods are extra periods beyond the third regulation period during a game, where normal hockey rules apply. Although in the past, full-length overtime periods were played, overtimes today are golden goal (a form of sudden death), meaning that the game ends immediately when a player scores a goal.

=== North American overtime ===
From November 21, 1942, when overtime (a non-sudden death extra period of 10 minutes duration) was eliminated due to war time restrictions and continuing through the 1982–83 season, all NHL regular-season games tied after 60 minutes of play ended as ties. On June 23, 1983, the NHL introduced a regular-season sudden death overtime period of five minutes. If the five-minute overtime period ended with no scoring, the game ended as a tie. In contrast, the World Hockey Association used a 10-minute, sudden death regular season overtime period for all seven years of its existence from 1972 to 1979 while awarding a point to both teams if the period resulted in no goals. In the first NHL games to go to overtime, on October 5, 1983, the Minnesota North Stars and Los Angeles Kings skated to a 3–3 tie, and the Detroit Red Wings and Winnipeg Jets tied 6–6. The first regular-season game decided by overtime was on October 8, 1983, as the New York Islanders beat the Washington Capitals 8–7.

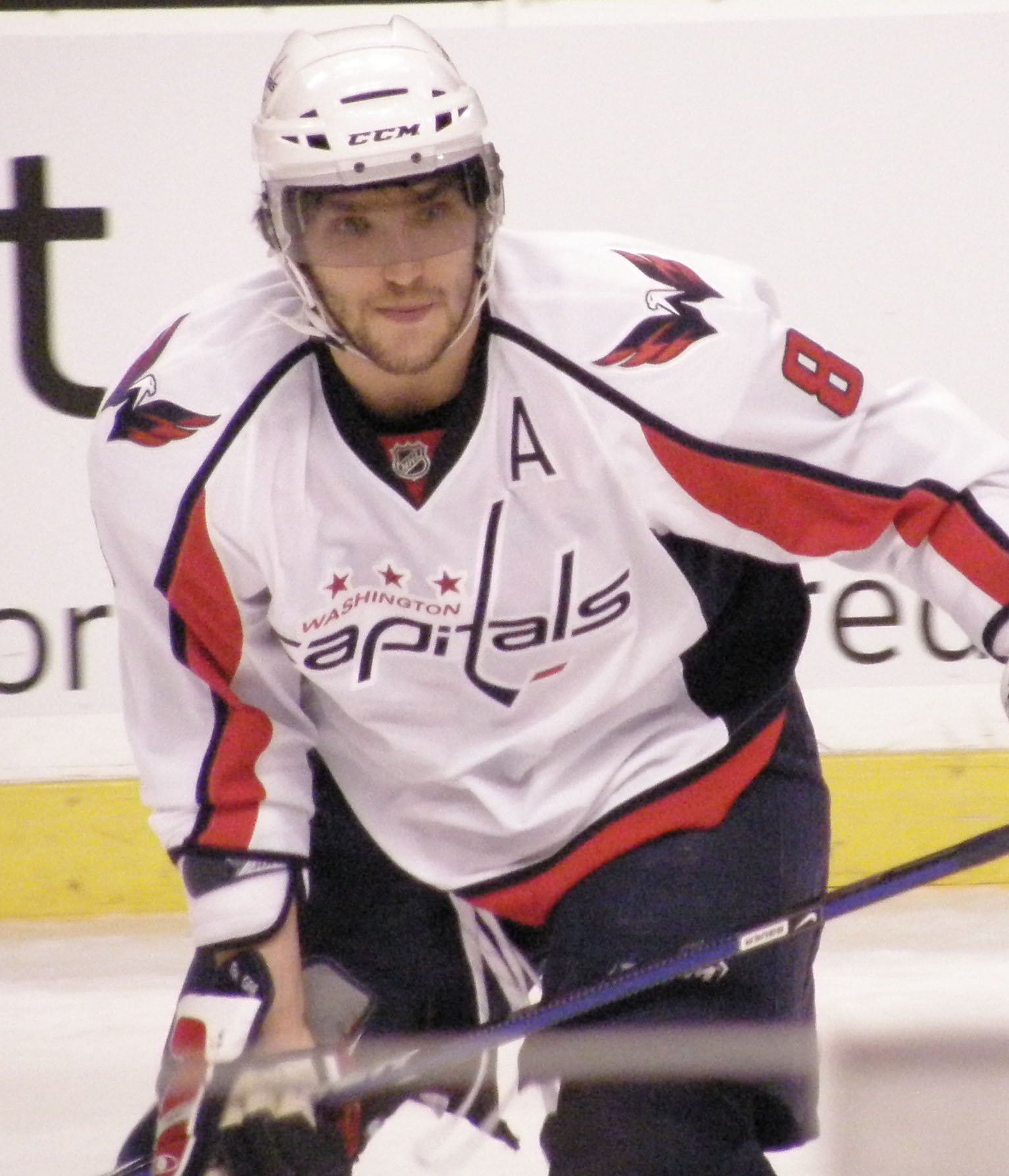
Alexander Ovechkin has the most NHL overtime goals in history, with 27.

In 1987–88 and since 1995, the American Hockey League has awarded teams one point in the standings for an overtime loss (OTL). In 1998, the AHL introduced a rule where teams will play the five-minute overtime period with four skaters and a goaltender, rather than at full strength (five skaters), except in two-man advantage situations. In a two-man advantage situation, the team with the advantage will play with five skaters against three skaters. The rule was popular and adopted by the NHL and ECHL the next season.

In the Stanley Cup playoffs and in all tiebreaker games, overtime periods are played like regulation periods – teams are at full strength (five skaters, barring penalties), there is no shootout, and each overtime period is 20 minutes with full intermissions between overtime periods. The game ends when either team scores a goal.

In many leagues (including the NHL for regular-season games since the 2005–06 season) and in international competitions, a failure to reach a decision in a single overtime may lead to a shootout. Some leagues may eschew overtime periods altogether and end games in shootout should teams be tied at the end of regulation. In the ECHL, the AHL, and the Southern Professional Hockey League, regular season overtime periods are played three on three for one five-minute period, with penalties resulting in the opponents skating one additional player on ice (up to two additional players) for each penalty. If the penalised player returns to the ice, the game becomes 4-on-4 or 5-on-5 until the next stoppage of play, when it becomes 3-on-3. Prior to the 2014–15 season, the AHL set the overtime period at seven minutes, but reverted to the now-standard five-minute period the following year. The idea of using 3-on-3 skaters for the entirety of a five-minute overtime period for a regular season game was adopted by the NHL on June 24, 2015, for use in the 2015–16 NHL season. The ECHL has changed the overtime to seven minutes for the 2019–20 season.

The PWHL follows the same overtime procedure as the NHL for both preseason and regular season (5 minutes before scoring, plus shootouts) and the playoffs (multiple 20-minute periods before scoring).

Since 1999–00, the team losing in overtime in the NHL (and in most other leagues) receives one point in the standings. If, however, a team pulls its goaltender in overtime other than for a delayed penalty, and the opposing team then scores into the empty net, the team that was scored on forfeits its standings point. As of November 2025, this rule has only come into play three times in the NHL.

=== International overtime ===
In IIHF play, rules for overtime depend on the stage of the competition.

New overtime procedures debuted at the 2019 IIHF World Championship that will be in effect for all IIHF championships, including from the 2022 Winter Olympics hereafter. All overtime periods will be 3-on-3 regardless of round robin or preliminary (five minutes with a three-round shootout), knockout rounds including third place games (ten minutes with a five-round shootout), or the championship (twenty minutes, no shootout). In the championship game only, if that overtime is scoreless, a full intermission will be conducted before the procedure repeats. The overtime ends on whoever scores next. In all cases, teams will change ends.

== Shootout ==
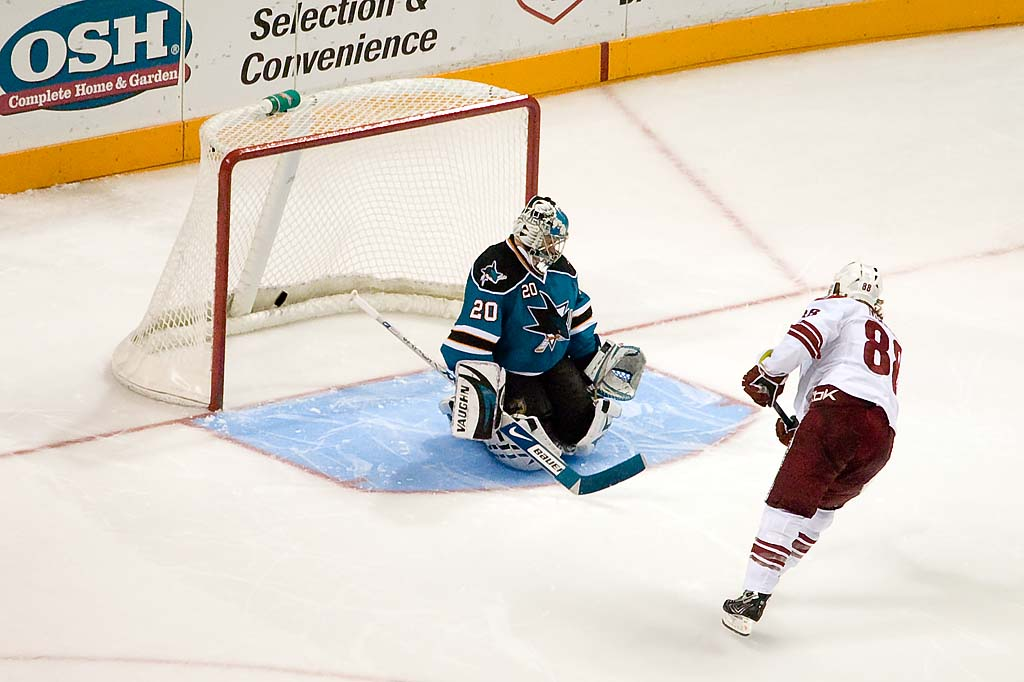
Peter Mueller of the Arizona Coyotes (white jersey) scoring a shootout goal on Evgeni Nabokov of the San Jose Sharks (teal jersey).

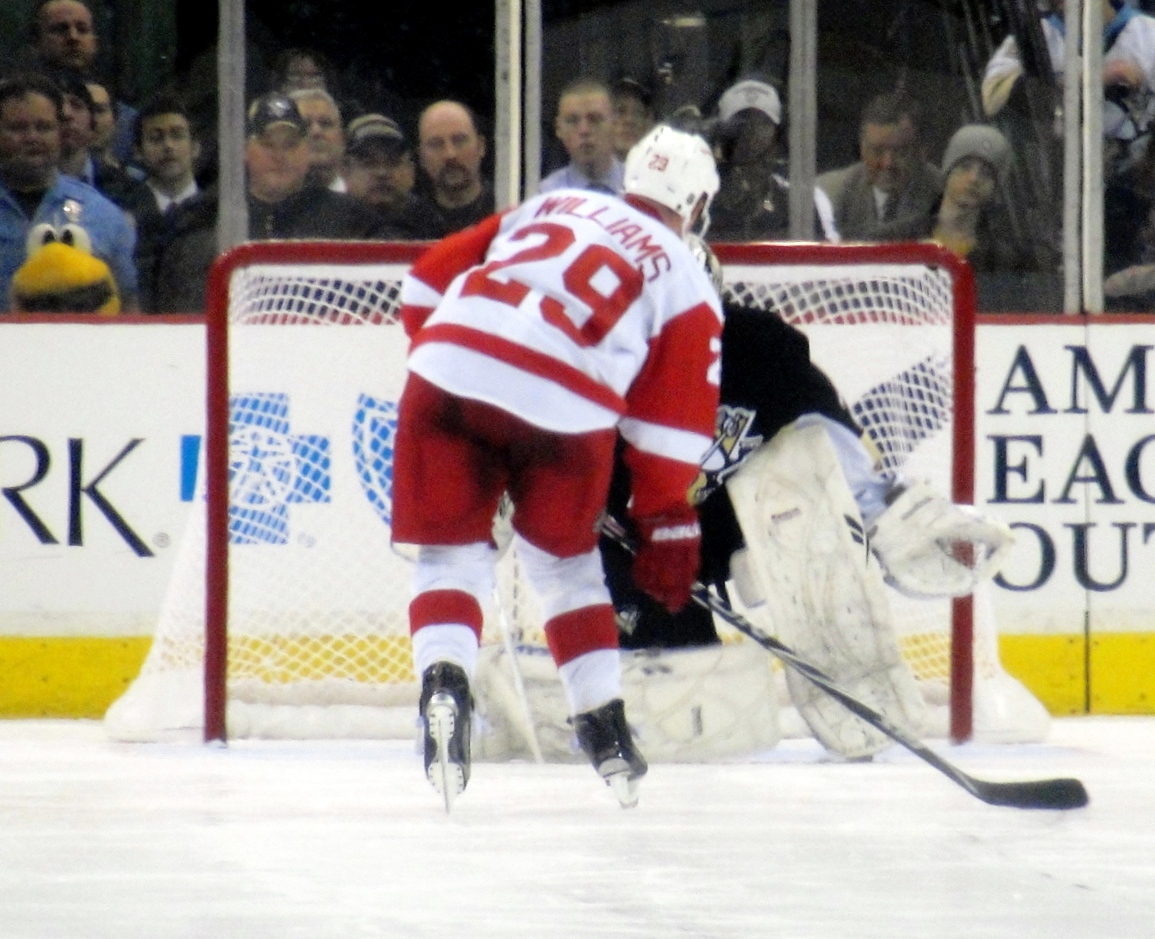
Jason Williams of the Detroit Red Wings attempting a shootout shot on Marc-André Fleury.

=== International shootouts ===
In international competition, shootouts (or more formally, game-winning shots (GWS), and in some European countries, bullets, or bullits), are often used. Each coach selects three skaters from their team to take penalty shots one at a time against the opposing goaltender, with teams alternating shots. Each team gets one shot per round. The winner is the team with more goals after three rounds or the team that amasses an unreachable advantage before then (e.g., a team gains a two-goal lead with only one round left). If the shootout is tied after three rounds, tie-breaker rounds are played one at a time (with each team taking one additional shot) until there is a winner.

The IIHF first adopted the game-winning-shot procedure in 1992 when a new playoff procedure in the Winter Olympics and World Championships required a winner for each game. At that time, the shootout was five rounds and only used for knock-out games. In 2006, it was reduced to three rounds and used for all games, eliminating the possibility of tied games at IIHF events. Tie-breaker rounds are still used as needed, and the same or new players can take the tie-break shots, which is also done in reverse order. As of May 2016, all IIHF preliminary round games that are not decided by overtime, are decided by a three-round shootout. However, all playoff & bronze medal games of IIHF top level championships (especially the Olympics) are decided by five round shootouts. Since 2018 it's five rounds of shootout for all games including round robin games.

Since 2019, the gold-medal game uses multiple 20-minute overtime periods of 3-on-3, and applies to both genders.

=== North American shootouts ===
Most lower minor leagues (ECHL, Central, UHL) have featured a shootout where, at the end of regulation, a shootout similar to the international tournament format is used.

However, in 2000, the ECHL adopted the AHL's four-on-four overtime before the shootout.

For the 2004–05 AHL season, the AHL adopted a five-man shootout, which was first used in that league in 1986–87. The standard five-man shootout is used after four-on-four overtime for all minor leagues in North America. The AHL switched to the NHL formatted three-man shootout for the 2014–15 season.

The Central Collegiate Hockey Association added the shootout as of the 2008–09 season.

Following the lead of minor leagues, in the NHL's first post-lockout season of 2005–06, the league ends exhibition and regular season games still tied after a five-minute-length, three-skaters-per-side overtime period (as of the 2015–16 NHL season onwards) with a shootout. The NHL format is a three-round shootout with tiebreaker rounds as needed. All skaters (except goalies) on a team's roster must shoot before any player can shoot a second time. On December 16, 2014, the longest shootout in NHL history went to 20 rounds before Nick Bjugstad of the Florida Panthers scored to defeat the Washington Capitals; the previous record was 15 rounds.

The shootout is not used in the playoffs for any major North American league. Instead, full 20-minute overtime periods are played until one team scores a goal.

In the National Hockey League and American Hockey League All-Star Skills Competitions, the competition ends in a penalty shootout known as the Breakaway Relay.

=== Tactics ===
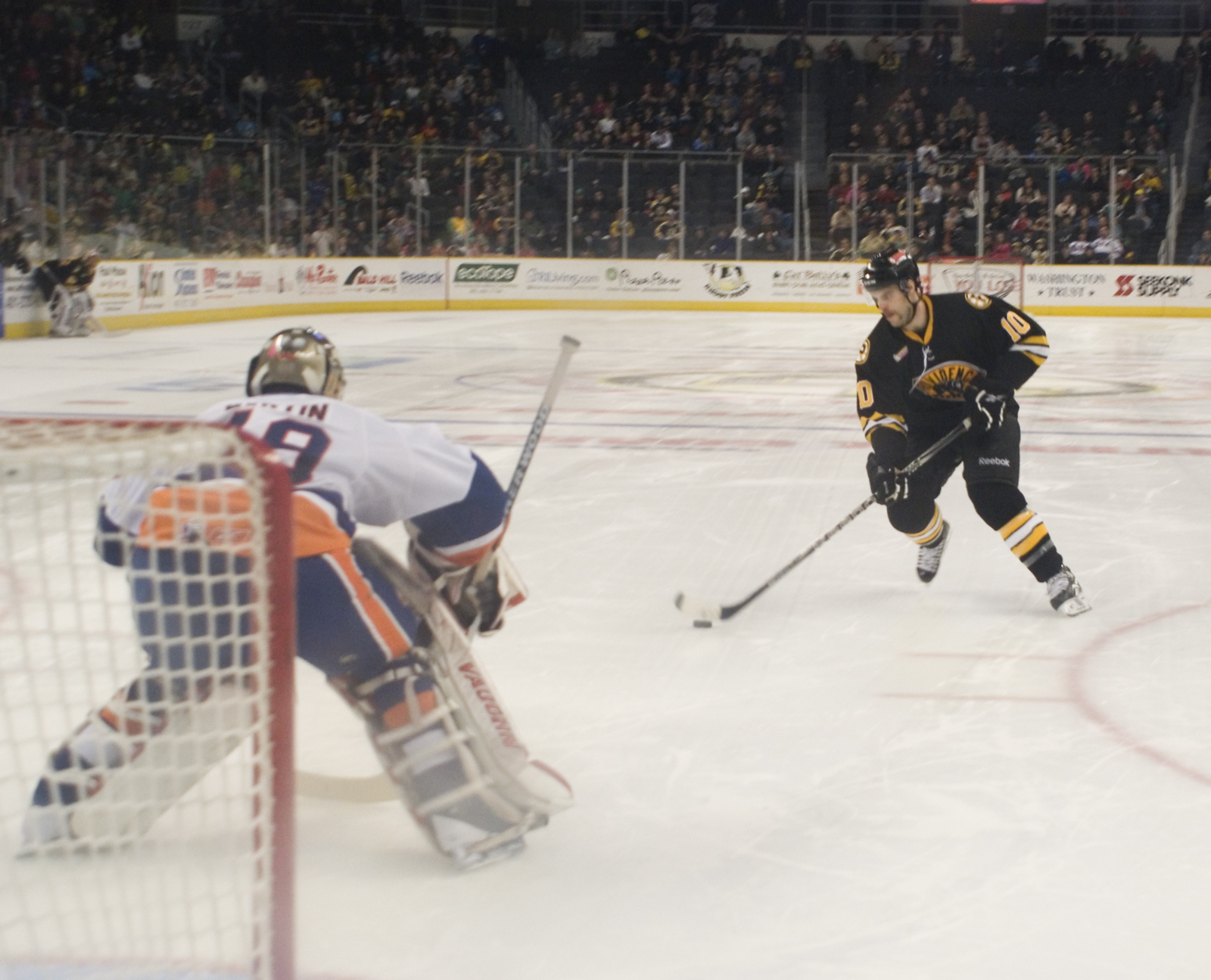
A shootout between the Providence Bruins (Boston Bruins AHL affiliate) and Bridgeport Sound Tigers (New York Islanders AHL affiliate)

Tactics are very important during penalty shots and overtime shootouts for both the shooter and the goalie. Both shooters and goalies commonly consult their teammates and coaches for advice on the opposing player's style of play. Shooters often consider the goalie's strengths and weaknesses (such as a fast glove or stick save), preferred goaltending style (such as butterfly or stand-up) and method of challenging the shooter. Goaltenders often consider the shooter's shot preference, expected angle of attack, a patented move a shooter commonly uses and even handedness of the shooter.

Most shooters attempt to out-deke the goalie in order to create a better scoring chance. Former Detroit Red Wings forward Pavel Datsyuk and Tampa Bay Lightning forward Martin St. Louis are examples of players who commonly use this tactic. However, it is not uncommon for a shooter to simply shoot for an opening without deking. This is commonly referred to as sniping. This is most commonly performed when a goalie challenges a shooter by giving them an open hole (by keeping a glove, pad or stick out of position or being out of sound goaltending position altogether to tempt the shooter to aim for the given opening). Former NHL forwards Markus Näslund and Brett Hull are two players commonly referred to as snipers. Very rarely a shooter may take a slapshot or wrist shot from the point or top of the slot. This is almost exclusively performed when a shooter either has a high level of confidence in their shot or they attempt to catch the goalie by surprise. Retired players such as Brian Rolston, Todd Bertuzzi, Chris Pronger, and Daniel Sedin have all used this tactic with success. Among all players, Patrick Kane leads all players in shootout goals and shoot-out deciding goals.

== List of notable overtime games ==
The longest overtime game in history was in the Norwegian GET-ligaen. The game ended in octuple overtime after 217:14 played (157:14 in overtime).

=== NHL ===
This is a list of all National Hockey League (NHL) playoff games that went into at least three overtimes (winning team is bold).

Overtime		Overtime length (min:sec)	Away team	Score	Home team	Date	Scorer	Arena	Winning goaltender	Losing goaltender
1.	6th	116:30	Detroit Red Wings	1–0	Montreal Maroons	March 24, 1936	Mud Bruneteau	Montreal Forum	Normie Smith	Lorne Chabot
2.	6th	104:46	Boston Bruins	0–1	Toronto Maple Leafs	April 3, 1933 †	Ken Doraty	Maple Leaf Gardens	Lorne Chabot	Tiny Thompson
3.	5th	92:01	Philadelphia Flyers	2–1	Pittsburgh Penguins	May 4, 2000	Keith Primeau	Mellon Arena	Brian Boucher	Ron Tugnutt
4.	5th	90:27	Columbus Blue Jackets	2–3	Tampa Bay Lightning	August 11, 2020	Brayden Point	Scotiabank Arena §	Andrei Vasilevskiy	Joonas Korpisalo
5.	5th	80:48	Mighty Ducks of Anaheim	4–3	Dallas Stars	April 24, 2003	Petr Sýkora	American Airlines Center	Jean-Sébastien Giguère	Marty Turco
6.	4th	79:47	Florida Panthers	3–2	Carolina Hurricanes	May 18, 2023	Matthew Tkachuk	PNC Arena	Sergei Bobrovsky	Frederik Andersen
7.	4th	79:15	Pittsburgh Penguins	3–2	Washington Capitals	April 24, 1996	Petr Nedvěd	USAir Arena	Ken Wregget	Olaf Kölzig
8.	4th	78:06	Dallas Stars	4–5	Vancouver Canucks	April 11, 2007	Henrik Sedin	General Motors Place	Roberto Luongo	Marty Turco
9.	4th	70:18	Toronto Maple Leafs	3–2	Detroit Red Wings	March 23, 1943	Jack McLean	Detroit Olympia	Turk Broda	Johnny Mowers
10.	4th	69:03	San Jose Sharks	1–2	Dallas Stars	May 4, 2008 †	Brenden Morrow	American Airlines Center	Marty Turco	Evgeni Nabokov
11.	5th	68:52	New York Rangers	1–2	Montreal Canadiens	March 28, 1930	Gus Rivers	Montreal Forum	George Hainsworth	John Ross Roach
12.	4th	68:47	New York Islanders	3–2	Washington Capitals	April 18, 1987 ††	Pat LaFontaine	Capital Centre	Kelly Hrudey	Bob Mason
13.	4th	65:43	New Jersey Devils	0–1	Buffalo Sabres	April 27, 1994	Dave Hannan	Buffalo Memorial Auditorium	Dominik Hašek	Martin Brodeur
14.	4th	61:09	Montreal Canadiens	3–2	Detroit Red Wings	March 27, 1951	Maurice Richard	Detroit Olympia	Gerry McNeil	Terry Sawchuk
15.	4th	60:40	New York Americans	3–2	New York Rangers	March 27, 1938	Lorne Carr	Madison Square Garden	Earl Robertson	Dave Kerr
16.	3rd	59:32	New York Rangers	4–3	Montreal Canadiens	March 26, 1932	Bun Cook	Montreal Forum	John Ross Roach	George Hainsworth
17.	3rd	59:25	Boston Bruins	2–1	New York Rangers	March 21, 1939	Mel Hill	Madison Square Garden	Frank Brimsek	Dave Kerr
18.	3rd	57:34	Dallas Stars	3–2	Edmonton Oilers	April 27, 1999 †	Joe Nieuwendyk	Skyreach Centre	Ed Belfour	Tommy Salo
19.	3rd	56:12	Chicago Blackhawks	3–2	Anaheim Ducks	May 19, 2015	Marcus Krüger	Honda Center	Corey Crawford	Frederik Andersen
20.	3rd	55:13	Edmonton Oilers	3–2	Boston Bruins	May 15, 1990*	Petr Klíma	Boston Garden	Bill Ranford	Andy Moog
21.	3rd	54:51	Dallas Stars	2–1	Buffalo Sabres	June 19, 1999** †	Brett Hull	Marine Midland Arena	Ed Belfour	Dominik Hašek
22.	3rd	54:47	Detroit Red Wings	3–2	Carolina Hurricanes	June 8, 2002*	Igor Larionov	Raleigh Entertainment & Sports Arena	Dominik Hašek	Artūrs Irbe
23.	3rd	54:41	New York Rangers	2–1	Washington Capitals	May 2, 2012	Marián Gáborík	Verizon Center	Henrik Lundqvist	Braden Holtby
24.	3rd	53:54	Philadelphia Flyers	3–2	Toronto Maple Leafs	April 16, 2003	Mark Recchi	Air Canada Centre	Roman Čechmánek	Ed Belfour
25.	3rd	53:50	Chicago Blackhawks	3–2	Montreal Canadiens	April 9, 1931*	Marvin Wentworth	Montreal Forum	Charlie Gardiner	George Hainsworth
26.	3rd	52:12	Montreal Canadiens	1–2	Chicago Blackhawks	March 26, 1961	Murray Balfour	Chicago Stadium	Glenn Hall	Jacques Plante
27.	3rd	52:08	Boston Bruins	3–4	Chicago Blackhawks	June 12, 2013*	Andrew Shaw	United Center	Corey Crawford	Tuukka Rask
28.	3rd	51:49	Detroit Red Wings	2–1	Montreal Canadiens	April 1, 1937	Hec Kilrea	Montreal Forum	Earl Robertson	Wilf Cude
29.	3rd	51:43	Chicago Blackhawks	2–2	Montreal Canadiens	March 26, 1930	Howie Morenz	Montreal Forum	George Hainsworth	Charlie Gardiner
T30.	3rd	51:12	Tampa Bay Lightning	1–2	New Jersey Devils	May 2, 2003 †	Grant Marshall	Continental Airlines Arena	Martin Brodeur	John Grahame
T30.	3rd	51:12	San Jose Sharks	3–4	Nashville Predators	May 5, 2016	Mike Fisher	Bridgestone Arena	Pekka Rinne	Martin Jones
32.	3rd	50:02	Chicago Blackhawks	2–1	Calgary Flames	April 23, 1996 †	Joe Murphy	Canadian Airlines Saddledome	Ed Belfour	Rick Tabaracci
33.	3rd	49:57	Pittsburgh Penguins	4–3	Detroit Red Wings	June 2, 2008*	Petr Sýkora	Joe Louis Arena	Marc-André Fleury	Chris Osgood
34.	3rd	48:00	New York Rangers	1–2	Boston Bruins	April 2, 1939 ††	Mel Hill	Boston Garden	Frank Brimsek	Bert Gardiner
35.	3rd	47:37	New Jersey Devils	3–4	Montreal Canadiens	April 24, 1997	Patrice Brisebois	Molson Centre	José Théodore	Martin Brodeur
36.	3rd	47:06	Ottawa Senators	4–3	Pittsburgh Penguins	April 22, 2010	Matt Carkner	Mellon Arena	Pascal Leclaire	Marc-André Fleury
37.	3rd	46:52	Edmonton Oilers	3–4	Winnipeg Jets	May 25, 2021 †	Kyle Connor	Bell MTS Place	Connor Hellebuyck	Mike Smith
38.	3rd	46:21	Dallas Stars	1–0	New Jersey Devils	June 8, 2000*	Mike Modano	Continental Airlines Arena	Ed Belfour	Martin Brodeur
39.	3rd	45:58	Pittsburgh Penguins	4–3	New York Rangers	May 3, 2022	Evgeni Malkin	Madison Square Garden	Louis Domingue	Igor Shesterkin
40.	2nd	45:35	Boston Bruins	2–1	Montreal Maroons	March 20, 1930	Harry Oliver	Montreal Forum	Tiny Thompson	Flat Walsh
41.	3rd	44:52	Montreal Canadiens	1–2	Detroit Red Wings	March 22, 1949	Max McNab	Detroit Olympia	Harry Lumley	Bill Durnan
42.	3rd	44:33	Colorado Avalanche	3–2	Chicago Blackhawks	May 8, 1996	Joe Sakic	United Center	Patrick Roy	Ed Belfour
43.	3rd	44:31	Colorado Avalanche	1–0	Florida Panthers	June 10, 1996** †	Uwe Krupp	Miami Arena	Patrick Roy	John Vanbiesbrouck
44.	3rd	44:30	Ottawa Senators	2–3	Toronto Maple Leafs	May 4, 2002	Gary Roberts	Air Canada Centre	Curtis Joseph	Patrick Lalime
45.	3rd	44:03	Tampa Bay Lightning	2–1	Washington Capitals	April 20, 2003 †	Martin St. Louis	MCI Center	Nikolai Khabibulin	Olaf Kölzig
46.	3rd	43:18	Mighty Ducks of Anaheim	2–1	Detroit Red Wings	April 10, 2003	Paul Kariya	Joe Louis Arena	Jean-Sébastien Giguère	Curtis Joseph
47.	3rd	43:00	Toronto Maple Leafs	5–4	Detroit Red Wings	March 27, 1960	Frank Mahovlich	Detroit Olympia	Johnny Bower	Terry Sawchuk
48.	3rd	42:28	Vancouver Canucks	5–4	Calgary Flames	April 17, 2004	Brendan Morrison	Pengrowth Saddledome	Alex Auld	Miikka Kiprusoff
49.	3rd	42:24	San Jose Sharks	2–3	Edmonton Oilers	May 10, 2006	Shawn Horcoff	Rexall Place	Dwayne Roloson	Vesa Toskala
50.	3rd	42:20	Montreal Canadiens	1–0	Detroit Red Wings	March 29, 1951	Maurice Richard	Detroit Olympia	Gerry McNeil	Terry Sawchuk
51.	3rd	41:31	Mighty Ducks of Anaheim	2–3	Detroit Red Wings	May 4, 1997	Vyacheslav Kozlov	Joe Louis Arena	Mike Vernon	Mikhail Shtalenkov
52.	3rd	41:19	Chicago Blackhawks	2–3	New York Rangers	April 29, 1971	Pete Stemkowski	Madison Square Garden	Ed Giacomin	Tony Esposito
53.	3rd	41:15	Anaheim Ducks	4–3	Detroit Red Wings	May 3, 2009	Todd Marchant	Joe Louis Arena	Jonas Hiller	Chris Osgood
54.	3rd	41:00	Nashville Predators	2–3	Chicago Blackhawks	April 21, 2015	Brent Seabrook	United Center	Corey Crawford	Pekka Rinne
55.	3rd	40:26	Chicago Blackhawks	3–4	St. Louis Blues	April 17, 2014	Alexander Steen	Scottrade Center	Ryan Miller	Corey Crawford

*Stanley Cup Final game (Six occurrences, through 2024 playoffs, excluding **)
**Stanley Cup winning goal (Two occurrences, through 2024 playoffs)
† Series-clinching goal (Nine occurrences, through 2024 playoffs, excluding ††)
†† Game 7 (Two occurrences, through 2024 playoffs)
§ Game played at a neutral site
In six of these 55 games, the overtime goal was the only goal of the game, including the 1996 Stanley Cup winning goal.

==== Notable NHL playoff overtime games ====
- March 24, 1936: The Detroit Red Wings' Mud Bruneteau ends the longest Stanley Cup playoff game to date, scoring the game's only goal in a 1–0 victory over the Montreal Maroons. The goal came at 116:30 of sextuple overtime, for a total of 176:30 of game play. It is also the longest NHL game played, being a mere 3:30 short of the equivalent of playing three games back-to-back-to-back. Normie Smith made an unofficial record 92 saves in that game.
- February 4, 1939: The Boston Bruins' Mel Hill scores his third overtime goal of the Bruins' Stanley Cup semi-final series against the New York Rangers, setting an unsurpassed (as of now) NHL record for most overtime goals in a single playoff series, earning him the nickname thereafter of "Sudden Death" Hill. The series itself involves four overtime games, two of which go to triple overtime.
- April 23, 1950: Pete Babando scores at 8:31 of double overtime to give the Detroit Red Wings a 4–3 win for the title in the seventh game of the 1950 Stanley Cup Final over the New York Rangers. It is the first time that a seventh game of a Final series goes to overtime.
- April 21, 1951: Bill Barilko scores at 2:53 of overtime to give the Toronto Maple Leafs a 3–2 win in the fifth game of the 1951 Stanley Cup Final over the Montreal Canadiens for a 4–1 title victory. All five games in the series need to have overtime to be decided. Barilko was killed in a private plane crash in a remote part of northern Ontario a few months later. His story later serves as inspiration for the song "Fifty Mission Cap" by the Canadian band The Tragically Hip.
- April 16, 1954: Tony Leswick's shot hit Montreal Canadiens' defenceman Doug Harvey's glove and went into the net at 4:20 of overtime to give the Detroit Red Wings a 2–1 win and the title in the seventh game of the 1954 Stanley Cup Final over the Canadiens. No seventh game of a Final series has gone to overtime since.
- April 23, 1964: Bobby Baun of the Toronto Maple Leafs nets a game winner against Detroit 1:43 into overtime in game six of the Finals to tie the series 3–all. The goal is notable because Baun broke his ankle earlier in the game. It was frozen and taped, and Baun returned to the ice to score the winning goal.
- May 10, 1970: One of the most indelible moments in sports history is the sight of Bobby Orr's "in flight" goal that gave the Boston Bruins a 4–3 win and a four-game sweep of the St. Louis Blues for the title.
- May 24, 1980: Bob Nystrom of the New York Islanders scores the Stanley Cup clinching goal at 7:11 of overtime, beating the Philadelphia Flyers in six games for the title.
- April 14, 1981: After sitting on the bench for the entire game, Mike Crombeen scored the winning goal at 5:16 of double overtime to give the St. Louis Blues a 4–3 win over the Pittsburgh Penguins.
- April 10, 1982: "Miracle on Manchester" – Rookie Daryl Evans gives the Los Angeles Kings a 6–5 win over the Edmonton Oilers at 2:35 of overtime. The Kings had trailed the Oilers 5–0 after the second period of game three of the Smythe Division semifinal. This still remains the largest single game playoff comeback in NHL history.
- May 12, 1986: Doug Wickenheiser's overtime goal gives the St. Louis Blues a 6–5 win over the Calgary Flames in game six of the Campbell Conference Final. The goal, known as the "Monday Night Miracle", caps a 5–2 comeback and makes it more impressive that the three goals needed to tie the game were scored in the last ten minutes of the third period.
- May 18, 1986: A Brian Skrudland goal ends the shortest overtime in NHL history at just nine seconds. The winning goal gives the Montreal Canadiens a 3–2 victory over the Calgary Flames in game two of the 1986 Stanley Cup Final.
- April 18, 1987: "Easter Epic" – Pat LaFontaine of New York Islanders scores a goal against Washington Capitals at 8:47 of quadruple overtime which ends the longest game seven in NHL playoff history. Islanders goaltender Kelly Hrudey makes a record 73 saves.
- May 15, 1990: After hardly playing in overtime, Petr Klima came off the bench late in triple overtime and scored almost immediately to end the longest overtime in NHL Finals history, with 4:47 left. The goal gave the Edmonton Oilers a 3–2 victory over the Boston Bruins to open the 1990 Stanley Cup Final, setting the stage for the Oilers' fifth cup in seven years.
- April 24, 1993: In game four of the Adams division semifinal between the Buffalo Sabres and the Boston Bruins, Sabres forward Brad May scores in overtime to give Buffalo a 6–5 win and a four-game sweep of the Bruins in the series. Due to Buffalo commentator Rick Jeanneret's colorful play call when May scored, this game has been referred to in Buffalo as "May Day".
- April to June 1993: After losing in overtime of game one of the Adams division semifinal to the Quebec Nordiques, the Montreal Canadiens go on to win ten consecutive overtime games en route to winning the Stanley Cup. The Habs score another overtime winner the following year against the Boston Bruins, making it eleven consecutive playoff overtime wins.
- May 14, 1993: In game seven of the Patrick Division finals, David Volek, who spent most of the season as a healthy scratch, scored the series winning goal to give the New York Islanders a 4–3 victory ending the Pittsburgh Penguins chances at a three-peat.
- April 27, 1994: Dominik Hašek of the Buffalo Sabres stops all 70 shots produced by the New Jersey Devils as Dave Hannan scores the lone goal over a sprawling Martin Brodeur at 5:43 of quadruple overtime in game six of the Eastern Conference quarterfinal matchup.
- April 30, 1994: Pavel Bure scores 2:20 into double overtime of the seventh game of the opening round of Vancouver's playoff series with Calgary. The win gives the Vancouver Canucks three consecutive overtime wins over the favored Calgary Flames, who squander a 3–1 series lead.
- May 27, 1994: Stéphane Matteau scores the game-winning goal at 4:24 of double overtime with a wrap-around, beating Martin Brodeur and the New Jersey Devils in game seven, advancing the New York Rangers to the Stanley Cup Final (where they would ultimately win it for the first time since 1940). It is Matteau's second goal in double overtime periods of the series. The game is best known for Rangers announcer Howie Rose's emphatic radio call of the winning goal.
- April 24, 1996: Petr Nedvěd scores with 44.6 seconds remaining in quadruple overtime to give the Pittsburgh Penguins a 3–2 win over the Washington Capitals to tie their Eastern Conference quarterfinal series at two games apiece.
- May 16, 1996: Detroit Red Wings captain Steve Yzerman steals the puck from Wayne Gretzky and scores on a slap shot from the blue line with 18:45 remaining in double overtime, eliminating the St. Louis Blues in seven games to cap off their matchup in the Western Conference semifinals.
- June 10, 1996: Uwe Krupp became the 12th player in NHL history, and the first in 16 years, to end the Stanley Cup Final in overtime, scoring a goal at 4:31 of triple overtime, giving the Colorado Avalanche a 1–0 win and a sweep of the Florida Panthers for the title.
- June 19, 1999: Brett Hull scores with 5:09 left in triple overtime of game six to win the title for the Dallas Stars over the Buffalo Sabres. The goal is considered controversial by some fans due to disagreement on if the goal by Hull was legal or not. (see 1999 Stanley Cup Final). Dallas won 2–1 for a 4–2 title victory.
- May 4, 2000: Keith Primeau of the Philadelphia Flyers put a shot over the left shoulder of Pittsburgh Penguins goaltender Ron Tugnutt with 7:59 left in quintuple overtime, ending the longest game since the NHL expanded in 1967, and the game itself since 1936.
- June 8, 2000: Jason Arnott scores on Dallas Stars' goalie Ed Belfour in double overtime of game six to give the New Jersey Devils their second title.
- April 24, 2003: Petr Sykora of the Mighty Ducks of Anaheim scores on a centering feed from Adam Oates on Marty Turco of the Dallas Stars 48 seconds into quintuple overtime to win Game 1 of their Western Conference semifinal series. The Mighty Ducks appeared to win at 16:41 of triple overtime with a goal by Steve Rucchin, but it was waved off for the net coming off the pegs.
- April 11, 2007: Roberto Luongo, goaltender for the Vancouver Canucks, wins his first career playoff game while making 72 saves, one shy of Kelly Hrudey's record. Henrik Sedin scores the winning goal at 18:06 of quadruple overtime in Game 1 of the Western quarterfinals, beating the Dallas Stars 5–4. The game is Vancouver's longest in history, and the Stars' second longest, behind their five-overtime loss to Anaheim in 2003.
- May 4, 2008: Brenden Morrow scores on San Jose Sharks goalie Evgeni Nabokov at 9:03 of quadruple overtime in game six of the Western Conference Semi-final between the Sharks and Stars. The game sees an incredible goaltending duel as Nabokov makes 53 saves in the loss while Marty Turco of Dallas makes 61 saves for the win.
- June 2, 2008: In Game 5 of the 2008 Stanley Cup Final, the Pittsburgh Penguins' Petr Sýkora told Pierre Maguire of NBC that he would score the winning goal in overtime. At 9:57 of triple overtime, Sýkora scored on Detroit Red Wings' goaltender Chris Osgood and sent the series back to Pittsburgh for game six.
- June 9, 2010: Patrick Kane of the Chicago Blackhawks shoots a goal past Philadelphia Flyers goalie Michael Leighton 4:10 into overtime of game six of the Stanley Cup Final to give the Blackhawks a 4–3 win over the Flyers for their first title since 1961.
- April 27, 2011: Alexandre Burrows of the Vancouver Canucks scored at 5:22 of overtime past Corey Crawford of the Chicago Blackhawks to win the series 4–3 and the game 2–1, sending the Canucks to the Western Conference Semifinals, avoiding squandering a 3–0 series lead and a 1–0 lead in game seven in the third period.
- June 4, 2011: Another Burrows goal ends the second-shortest overtime in NHL history at just eleven seconds. The winning goal gives the Vancouver Canucks a 3–2 victory over the Boston Bruins in game two of the Stanley Cup Final.
- May 25, 2012: Adam Henrique of the New Jersey Devils scored at 1:03 into overtime past Henrik Lundqvist of the New York Rangers in game six of the Eastern Conference Final to send the Devils to the Stanley Cup Final for the first time since 2003.
- May 13, 2013: Patrice Bergeron of the Boston Bruins scored at 6:05 of overtime past James Reimer of the Toronto Maple Leafs to win the series 4–3 and the game 5–4, to send the Bruins to the Conference Semifinals to face the Rangers. It also capped a historic comeback in a game seven, coming back from a three-goal deficit in the third period. With fifty–one seconds to go, they tied the game. The tying goal was also scored by Bergeron. The 2012–13 Boston Bruins became the first team in NHL history to do so in the Stanley Cup playoffs.
- June 12, 2013: Andrew Shaw scored with 7:52 left in triple overtime as the Chicago Blackhawks beat the Boston Bruins 4–3 to open the Stanley Cup Final, ending the fifth-longest game in Stanley Cup Final history.
- June 13, 2014: Alec Martinez took a rebound off a Tyler Toffoli shot blocked by Henrik Lundqvist and scored with 5:17 left in double overtime in game five of the 2014 Stanley Cup Final, becoming the 16th player to win the Stanley Cup with an overtime goal as the Los Angeles Kings beat the New York Rangers 3–2, clinching the title 4–1 in the longest game in Kings history to that point (total game time 94:43). He became the first player to score two series-clinching playoff overtime goals in the same season since Martin Gélinas in 2004; on June 1, he scored 5:47 into overtime to defeat the Chicago Blackhawks 5–4 in game seven of the Western Conference Finals.
- May 13, 2015: Derek Stepan scored with 8:36 left in the first overtime in game seven in the Eastern Conference second round against the Washington Capitals to send the New York Rangers to the Eastern Conference Finals. The Capitals also had a 3–1 series lead before losing the final three games and ultimately losing the series.
- May 19, 2015: Marcus Kruger scored with 3:48 left in the third overtime in game two of the Western Conference Finals, as the Chicago Blackhawks beat the Anaheim Ducks, 3–2, tying the series at 1–all. This was Anaheim's first playoff loss at home that season and Chicago's longest overtime game to date. Chicago goalie Corey Crawford made 60 saves while defenceman Duncan Keith played seconds shy of 50 minutes on ice. Earlier in the second overtime period, Andrew Shaw used his head to direct the puck into the net, but the goal did not count.
- April 24, 2016: John Tavares scored the series-winner with 9:19 left in double overtime in game six of the Eastern Conference first round as the New York Islanders won a playoff series for the first time since 1993, beating the Florida Panthers 2–1, for a 4–2 series victory. He beat Roberto Luongo off a rebound of his own shot with a wraparound. It ended the longest home game in Islanders' history. Tavares also scored with 53.2 seconds left in regulation to force overtime. Three of those games in this series have gone to overtime, this and game five needed two.
- May 6, 2016: Mike Fisher scored with 8:48 left in triple overtime in game four of the Western Conference second round as the Nashville Predators beat the San Jose Sharks, 4–3, to tie the series at two games all. His goal ended the longest playoff game in Predators' history. Joe Pavelski could have won it at 7:34 of overtime, but officials waved it off as he crashed into Pekka Rinne, pinning him down before the puck crossed the goal line.
- May 25, 2017: Chris Kunitz scored at 5:09 of double overtime as the Pittsburgh Penguins beat the Ottawa Senators to advance to play the Nashville Predators in the Stanley Cup Final in winning game seven of the Eastern Conference Finals, 3–2. Sidney Crosby sent a soft backhand pass to Kunitz, whose knuckling shot beat Craig Anderson from the right faceoff circle.
- May 7, 2018: Evgeny Kuznetsov scored at 5:27 of overtime as the Washington Capitals eliminated the two-time defending champion Pittsburgh Penguins in game six of the Eastern Conference second round to advance to the Conference Finals for the first time in 20 years. Alexander Ovechkin passed the puck back to Kuznetsov, who tapped it away from Sidney Crosby on a turnover before beating Matt Murray between the pads.
- April 21, 2019: Tomáš Hertl scored the first short-handed overtime goal in a multiple overtime game in Stanley Cup playoff history with his goal at 11:17 in double overtime to beat the host Vegas Golden Knights 2–1 to force a seventh game in the Western Conference first round. Sharks goalie Martin Jones saved 58 of the Knights' 59 shots, a Sharks playoff game record.
- April 24, 2019: Brock McGinn deflected a pass from Justin Williams past Capitals' goaltender Braden Holtby at 11:05 into double overtime as the Carolina Hurricanes defeated the defending Stanley Cup champion Washington Capitals 4–3 in the third longest game seven in league history.
- August 11, 2020: Brayden Point scored his second goal of the game at 10:27 of quintuple overtime as the Tampa Bay Lightning beat the Columbus Blue Jackets 3–2 in game one of the Eastern Conference first round. This was the fourth-longest game in the history of the league (which turned out to be the longest in twenty years). Columbus goalie Joonas Korpisalo made 85 saves, breaking the record in any NHL game, with the previous playoff record held by Kelly Hrudey (73, on April 18, 1987). This was also the longest game to be played at a neutral site.
- May 25, 2021: Kyle Connor scored at 6:52 of triple overtime as the Winnipeg Jets beat the Edmonton Oilers 4–3, to end their North Division semifinal series. The goal capped the longest game in Jets/Thrashers' franchise history and completed the Jets' first ever playoff sweep.
- May 3, 2022: Evgeni Malkin scored at 5:58 of triple overtime as the Pittsburgh Penguins beat the host New York Rangers, 4–3, to open the Eastern Conference first round. Rangers goalie Igor Shesterkin made 79 saves off Pens' 83 shots, a Rangers playoff game record. Louis Domingue became the first goaltender to enter a playoff game after multiple overtime periods when he entered the game at 9:18 of double overtime following an injury to Pittsburgh goaltender Casey DeSmith.
- April 29, 2023: John Tavares scored at 4:36 of the overtime to end the Toronto Maple Leafs' 19-year series win drought, as they beat the Tampa Bay Lightning 2–1 in Game 6. Toronto became the first team to win three overtime games on the road in one playoff series.
- May 12, 2023: Nick Cousins scored at 15:32 of the first overtime as the Florida Panthers advanced to the Eastern Conference Final for the first time in 27 years, eliminating the Toronto Maple Leafs, with a 3–2 triumph as they earned a 4–1 series victory.
- May 18, 2023: Matthew Tkachuk scored with 12.7 seconds remaining in quadruple overtime as the Florida Panthers beat the Carolina Hurricanes, 3–2, to open the Eastern Conference Finals. Panthers goalie Sergei Bobrovsky saved 63 of the Hurricanes' 65 shots, a Panthers playoff game record, in the sixth-longest game in NHL history.
- May 4, 2025: Adam Lowry scored at 16:10 of double overtime as the Winnipeg Jets beat the St. Louis Blues 4–3 in game seven of the Western Conference first round, and advanced to the second round. This came after Cole Perfetti scored to tie the game at 19:57 of the third period, to date this is the latest tying goal in a game seven in NHL history.
- June 4, 2025: Leon Draisaitl scored his second goal of the game with 31 seconds left in overtime on a power play goal as the Edmonton Oilers beat the defending champion Florida Panthers 4–3 to open the Stanley Cup rematch finals.
- June 6, 2026: Shea Theodore, who was the last Golden Knight to possess the puck, was credited with the goal at 5:38 of double overtime when Hurricane forward Jordan Martinook flipped and shot the puck accidentally, and it ricocheted directly off the skate of goalie Brandon Bussi for a game-ending own goal. Also in that game, Mitch Marner set a new Cup finals record for the fastest hat trick, completing in 6 minutes, 10 seconds. Maurice Richard had held the record of 6 minutes, 21 seconds back in 1957. Vegas won after blowing a 4-nil lead in regulation, 5-4 for a 2-1 title lead.

=== Swedish ice hockey ===
This is a list of the longest games in the highest Swedish leagues.

Overtime		Overtime length (min:sec)	League	Home team	Score	Away team	Date	Scorer
1.	5th	96:19	Play-off to SDHL	Leksands IF	1–2	Färjestad BK	March 2, 2025	Wilma Johansson
2.	5th	80:41	Play-off to Kvalserien	IF Troja/Ljungby	2–1	Bofors IK	March 20, 2002	Mika Välilä
3.	4th	73:38	Play-off to Division 1	Olofströms IK	3–4	Kristianstads IK	March 7, 1995	Roman Steblecki
4.	4th	68:42	Play-off to Division 1	Osby IK	5–4	Mariestad BoIS HC	February 28, 1993	Jonas Evaldsson
5.	4th	62:18	SHL Semifinals	Skellefteå AIK	4–3	Luleå HF	April 7, 2026	Andreas Johnsson
6.	3rd	59:16	Elitserien Semi-finals	Leksands IF	3–2	Färjestad BK	March 23, 1997	Andreas Karlsson
7.	3rd	57:37	Play-off to Kvalserien	IFK Arboga IK	3–2	Bofors IK	March 13, 2002	Fredrik Gustavsson
8.	3rd	57:27	SHL Quarterfinals	Luleå HF	4–3	Frölunda HC	March 29, 2026	Mathias Bromé
9.	3rd	57:01	SHL Quarterfinals	Färjestad BK	3–2	HV71	March 30, 2019	Oskar Steen
10.	3rd	56:23	SHL Quarterfinals	Linköping HC	3–4	Skellefteå AIK	March 26, 2024	Axel Sandin Pellikka

=== KHL ===
This is a list of Kontinental Hockey League games that went to at least triple overtime.

Overtime		Overtime length (min:sec)	Home team	Score	Away team	Date	Scorer	Ref
1.	5th	82:09	HC CSKA Moscow	1–2	Jokerit	March 22, 2018	Mika Niemi	
2.	4th	66:14	Lev Praha	3–4	HC Donbass	March 21, 2014	Andrei Konev	
3.	3rd	58:48	Severstal Cherepovets	3–2	Lokomotiv Yaroslavl	February 25, 2013	Denis Kazionov	
4.	3rd	56:35	Admiral Vladivostok	2–3	Metallurg Magnitogorsk	March 12, 2014	Danis Zaripov	
5.	3rd	53:51	CSKA Moscow	2–3	SKA Saint Petersburg	April 10, 2021	Vasily Podkolzin	
6.	3rd	53:27	Vityaz Podolsk	2–3	SKA Saint Petersburg	March 7, 2020	Lukas Bengtsson	
7.	3rd	53:24	Torpedo Nizhny Novgorod	1-2	Salavat Yulaev Ufa	March 11, 2014	Alexander Stepanov	
8.	3rd	51:12	SKA Saint Petersburg	0–1	HC CSKA Moscow	March 26, 2016	Geoff Platt	
9.	3rd	49:18	Salavat Yulaev Ufa	0–1	Avangard Omsk	April 8, 2019	Alexei Bondarev	
10.	3rd	49:11	Metallurg Magnitogorsk	2–3	Avangard Omsk	March 15, 2011	Andrei Pervyshin	
11.	3rd	48:54	Traktor Chelyabinsk	1–2	Ak Bars Kazan	March 22, 2012	Danis Zaripov	
12.	3rd	45:14	Avangard Omsk	2–1	Admiral Vladivostok	February 22, 2017	Alexander Kucheryavenko	
13.	3rd	44:39	Ak Bars Kazan	4–3	Barys Astana	March 11, 2010	Niko Kapanen	
14.	3rd	41:39	HC CSKA Moscow	3–2	SKA Saint Petersburg	March 28, 2015	Roman Lyubimov	

=== Belarusian ice hockey ===
The longest game in Belarusian extraleague is game five of the 2021 Quarter-finals on March 10–11, 2021. HC Neman Grodno beat the HK Gomel, 2–1, at Gomel Ice Palace of Sports on a goal by Krystian Dziubiński at 9:04 of sextuple overtime. Maxim Gorodetsky was the winning goaltender for the Neman, making 78 saves.

Overtime		Overtime length (min:sec)	Away team	Score	Home team	Date	Scorer	Arena
1.	6th	109:04	HK Gomel	1–2	HC Neman Grodno	March 10–11, 2021	Krystian Dziubiński	Gomel Ice Palace of Sports
2.	6th	105:11	HK Gomel	1–2	Yunost Minsk	March 7, 2015	Vitaly Kiryuschenkov	Gomel Ice Palace of Sports
3.	3rd	49:28	Yunost Minsk	2–1	HC Shakhtyor Soligorsk	March 26, 2016	Maxim Parfeyevets	Chizhovka-Arena

=== Olympics – men's gold-medal game ===
This is a list of men's gold-medal games from the Olympics that needed overtime.

Overtime		Overtime length (min:sec)	Winning country	Score	Losing country	Year	Scorer
1	1st	9:40	Olympic Athletes from Russia	4–3	Germany	2018	Kirill Kaprizov
2	1st	7:40	Canada	3–2	United States	2010	Sidney Crosby
3	1st	1:41	United States	2–1	Canada	2026	Jack Hughes

=== Olympics – women's gold-medal game ===
This is a list of women's gold-medal games from the Olympics that needed overtime.

Overtime		Overtime length (min:sec)	Winning country	Score	Losing country	Year	Scorer
1	2nd	20:00 (6th round)*	United States	3–2	Canada	2018	Jocelyne Lamoureux
2	1st	8:10	Canada	3–2	United States	2014	Marie-Philip Poulin
3	1st	4:07	United States	2–1	Canada	2026	Megan Keller

*Game went to a shootout.

=== Czech ice hockey ===
Overtime		Overtime length (min:sec)	League	Home team	Score	Away team	Date	Scorer
1.	4th	78:51	Extraliga ledního hokeje	Mountfield HK	1–2	HC Vítkovice Ridera	April 13, 2023	Dominik Lakatoš
2.	4th	61:46	Extraliga ledního hokeje	HC Sparta Praha	2–3	HC Oceláři Třinec	April 13, 2024 ††	Miloš Roman
3.	3rd	53:51	Extraliga ledního hokeje	HC Mountfield České Budějovice	2–3	HC Vítkovice Steel	March 7, 2013 ††	Peter Húževka
4.	2nd	36:15	Extraliga ledního hokeje	PSG Zlín	3–4	HC Škoda Plzeň	April 21, 2013 **	Martin Straka
5.	2nd	25:09	Extraliga ledního hokeje	HC Sparta Praha	1–2	Bílí Tygři Liberec	April 24, 2016 **	Martin Bakoš

*Play-off finals game
**Play-off winning goal
† Series-clinching goal
†† Final game of series when series is tied (Game 5 in a best-of-5 series or Game 7 in best-of-7 series)

=== Deutsche Eishockey Liga ===
March 22, 2008: Philip Gogulla of the Cologne Sharks ends the longest German hockey game and the third longest worldwide, scoring the ninth-overall goal in a 5–4 victory over the Mannheim Eagles. The goal comes 8:16 of sextuple overtime for a total of 108:16 of overtime. It is the third quarter-final game (best of seven) in the Kölnarena in Cologne in front of an audience of 17,000. The game had begun at 5:30 pm and ends at 12:15 am.

=== Norwegian ice hockey ===
March 12, 2017: Joakim Jensen of the Storhamar Ishockey ends the longest hockey game in history, scoring with 2:46 left in octuple overtime for a total of 157:14 of overtime, and 217:14 of hockey played. It was Game 5 of the quarter-finals of the 2016–17 GET-ligaen playoffs against the Sparta Warriors in the CC Amfi. About 1,000 out of the 5,500 people that attended the game watched the entire game. The game started at 18:00 and ended at 2:32 the next morning.

Overtime		Overtime length (min:sec)	Away team	Score	Home team	Date	Scorer	Arena
1.	8th	157:14	Sparta Sarpsborg	1–2	Storhamar Ishockey	March 12, 2017	Joakim Jensen	CC Amfi
2.	4th	67:02	Vålerenga	5–4	Trondheim Black Panthers	March 8, 2003	Joakim Backlund	Leangen Ishall
3.	2nd	45:58	Storhamar Dragons	4–5	Vålerenga	March 28, 2000	Johan Brummer	Jordal Amfi

=== PWHL ===
To date, the Professional Women's Hockey League, which began in the 2023–24 season has had four games that went past double overtime. Taylor Wenczkowski of PWHL Boston scored the overtime winner against PWHL Montreal at the 11:44 mark of triple overtime in their game 2 semifinal match-up on May 11, 2024. In total, there were 51 minutes and 44 seconds played in overtime in the game, which was played at Place Bell in Laval, Quebec. Catherine Dubois of the Montreal Victoire scored the overtime winner against the Ottawa Charge at the 15:33 mark of quadruple overtime in their game 2 semifinal match-up on May 11, 2025. In total, there was 1 hour, 15 minutes, and 33 seconds played in overtime in the game, which was played at Place Bell in Laval, Quebec. Katy Knoll of the Minnesota Frost scored the overtime winner against the Ottawa Charge at the 9:57 mark of triple overtime in their game 3 final match-up on May 24, 2025. In total, there were 49 minutes, and 57 seconds played in overtime in the game, which was played at Xcel Energy Center in Saint Paul, Minnesota. Marie-Philip Poulin of the Montreal Victoire scored the overtime winner against the Minnesota Frost at the 4:02 mark of triple overtime in their game 2 semifinal match-up on May 5, 2026. In total, there were 44 minutes, and 2 seconds of overtime in the game, which was played at Place Bell in Laval, Quebec.

Overtime		Overtime length (min:sec)	Away team	Score	Home team	Date	Scorer
1.	4th	75:33	Ottawa Charge	2–3	Montreal Victoire	May 11, 2025	Catherine Dubois
2.	3rd	51:44	PWHL Boston	2–1	PWHL Montreal	May 11, 2024	Taylor Wenczkowski
3.	3rd	49:57	Ottawa Charge	1–2	Minnesota Frost	May 24, 2025	Katy Knoll
4.	3rd	44:02	Minnesota Frost	0–1	Montreal Victoire	May 5, 2026	Marie-Philip Poulin

=== Notable minor league, college and junior overtimes ===
==== AHL ====
The longest game in AHL history is game four of the 2018 Atlantic Division Final on May 9, 2018. The Lehigh Valley Phantoms beat the Charlotte Checkers, 2–1, at Bojangles Coliseum on a goal by Alex Krushelnyski at 6:48 of quintuple overtime. Alex Lyon was the winning goaltender for the Phantoms, making 94 saves.

Longest American Hockey League (AHL) overtime games
Overtime length (min:sec)		Away team	Score	Home team	Date
1.	86:48	Lehigh Valley Phantoms	2–1	Charlotte Checkers	May 9, 2018
2.	82:58	Philadelphia Phantoms	3–2	Albany River Rats	April 24, 2008
3.	74:56**	Houston Aeros	1–2	Hamilton Bulldogs	May 30, 2003
4.	74:08	Rochester Americans	2–3	New Haven Nighthawks	April 10, 1982
5.	64:20	San Diego Gulls	3–2	Bakersfield Condors	May 3, 2019
6.	62:42	Syracuse Stars	3–2	Cleveland Barons	April 4, 1938
7.	61:46	Cleveland Barons	2–3	Pittsburgh Hornets	April 14, 1953
8.	60:16	Oklahoma City Barons	2–1	Utica Comets	May 7, 2015
9.	59:47	Providence Reds	2–3	Cleveland Barons	March 28, 1939
10.	57:22	Rockford IceHogs	4–3	Chicago Wolves	April 26, 2018
11.	53:02	Philadelphia Phantoms	2–1	Norfolk Admirals	April 28, 2004
12.	52:26	Binghamton Senators	2–3	Wilkes-Barre/Scranton Penguins	April 25, 2005
13.	51:22	Calgary Wranglers	2–3	Coachella Valley Firebirds	May 15, 2023
14.	50:16	Cleveland Barons	4–3	Springfield Indians	April 4, 1962
15.	47:49	Worcester IceCats	3–4	Hartford Wolf Pack	May 5, 2004
16.	46:15	Pittsburgh Hornets	2–1	Springfield Indians	March 22, 1941
17.	46:00	Worcester IceCats	3–2	Manchester Monarchs	April 22, 2004
18.	45:17*	Nova Scotia Oilers	4–3	Maine Mariners	April 11, 1985
19.	44:48**	Cleveland Barons	4–5	Philadelphia Ramblers	April 4, 1939
20.	44:30	Pittsburgh Hornets	3–2	Hershey Bears	March 31, 1951
21.	44:18	Baltimore Clippers	3–4	Rochester Americans	April 16, 1967
22.	44:13	Wilkes-Barre/Scranton Penguins	3–4	Manchester Monarchs	May 6, 2015
23.	44:02	Pittsburgh Hornets	2–3	Cleveland Barons	April 3, 1956
24.	41:51	Laval Rocket	6-5	Rochester Americans	May 25, 2022

*Overtime format was one five-minute period followed by 20-minute periods
**Calder Cup Finals game

==== Canadian Interuniversity Sport – men ====
The University of New Brunswick Varsity Reds needed 61:53 of overtime (quadruple overtime) to defeat the Acadia University Axemen 3–2 on February 27, 2011, in game two of a best-of-five AUS semi-final series at Fredericton, New Brunswick. Nick MacNeil scored the game-winner at 11:53 of the seventh period overall.

York University Lions and Lakehead University Thunderwolves went to a fourth overtime period (50:13 minutes of overtime) on February 14, 2007, in Thunder Bay, Ontario, to decide a winner in OUA men's playoff hockey action. Lakehead won the game at the 13-second mark of the fourth overtime period.

The 2025 University Cup quarterfinal between the Toronto Metropolitan University Bold and the Mount Royal University Cougars ended in a 5–4 victory for the Bold after a goal from Spencer Shugrue at 3:33 of quintuple overtime. The game set the record for the longest game in U Sports men's hockey history at 143:33, of which 83:33 were overtime.

==== Canadian Interuniversity Sport – women ====
Morgan McHaffie scored at 7:14 of sextuple overtime to lead the Queen's Golden Gaels to a 2–1 win over the host Guelph Gryphons in the first game of the best-of-three OUA women's hockey final, March 2, 2011. The game, which lasted 167 minutes and 14 seconds, including 107:14 of extra time, is the longest on record in CIS or NCAA hockey – women's or men's. Winning goaltender Mel Dodd-Moher made 66 saves, while Danielle Skoufranis made 44 saves in a losing cause. It is the longest game played sanctioned by Hockey Canada.

==== ECHL ====
Overtime length (min:sec)		Away team	Score	Home team	Date
1.	77:18	Colorado Eagles	2–3	Idaho Steelheads	April 28–29, 2014
2.	66:10	Elmira Jackals	5–4	Trenton Devils	April 10, 2009
3.	64:19	South Carolina Stingrays	4–3	Gwinnett Gladiators	April 6–7, 2012
4.	61:24	Louisiana IceGators	2–3	Greenville Grrrowl	May 5, 2000
5.	55:19	Jackson Bandits	5–4	Louisiana IceGators	April 5, 2002
6.	53:30	Las Vegas Wranglers	3–4	Alaska Aces	May 2, 2006
7.	50:37	South Carolina Stingrays	3–4	Mississippi Sea Wolves	April 13, 1999
8.	48:13	Idaho Steelheads	3–2	Las Vegas Wranglers	April 6, 2011
9.	46:30	Mississippi Sea Wolves	3–4	Pee Dee Pride	May 2, 1999
10.	46:23	Utah Grizzlies	4–3	Fresno Falcons	April 14, 2008
11.	45:47	Hampton Roads Admirals	2–1	Greensboro Monarchs	April 9, 1991*
12.	45:38	Florida Everblades	2–1	South Carolina Stingrays	May 6, 2015
13.	45:30	South Carolina Stingrays	1–0	Toledo Walleye	May 27, 2015**
14.	44:03	Wheeling Nailers	2–1	Reading Royals	May 5, 2016
15.	44:02	Kalamazoo Wings	3–4	Greenville Road Warriors	April 26, 2014
16.	43:07	Toledo Walleye	4–5	Colorado Eagles	May 19, 2017
17.	42:31	Colorado Eagles	5–4	Utah Grizzlies	April 17, 2016
18.	40:36	Idaho Steelheads	0–1	Stockton Thunder	May 5, 2010

* Championship Series game.

** Game 7

==== International Hockey League ====
On May 12, 2008, one of the longest games in IHL history, if not the longest, took place in Fort Wayne, Indiana. It was the seventh game of the Turner Cup Final between the hometown Fort Wayne Komets and Port Huron Icehawks. The game was tied 2–2 through regulation. The first two extra periods solved nothing, but 23 seconds into the third overtime period, at some point after midnight ET, Justin Hodgman scored the winning goal to give the Komets their fifth Turner Cup title. It was the club's first since 1993, and their sixth overall, with their last championship being the Colonial Cup in 2003. The Komets would win again the following year with an easy game five victory at home, which was the first time in franchise history they won back-to-back championships. They would follow up with a third consecutive Turner Cup in 2010, again clinching on home ice, securing a dynasty.

==== VHL ====
On April 25, 2018, in game 5 of the 2018 VHL finals, SKA-Neva defeated HC Dinamo Saint Petersburg 4–3 in a game that needed 103:36 of overtime to be settled. Svyatoslav Grebinshchikov scored the game-winning goal 3:36 of sextuple overtime.

==== NCAA ====
Overall game length (min:sec)	Overtime length	Number of overtimes	Winning team	Score	Losing team	Where it occurred	Date
151:42	91:42	5	UMass	4–3	Notre Dame	Hockey East First Round (Game 1, Best of 3)	March 7, 2015
150:22	90:22	5	Quinnipiac University	3–2	Union College	ECACH Quarter-Finals (Game 1, Best of 3)	March 12, 2010
142:13	82:13	5	University of Minnesota Duluth	3–2	University of North Dakota	NCAA Midwest Regional (second round)	March 27, 2021
141:35	81:35	5	Yale University	3–2	Union College	ECACHL First Round (Game 2, Best of 3)	March 4, 2006
129:30	69:30	4	Colorado College	1–0	Wisconsin Badgers	WCHA First Round (Game 2, Best of 3)	March 3, 1997
123:53	63:53	4	St. Lawrence	3–2	Boston University	NCAA East Regional (second round)	March 26, 2000
121:05	61:05	4	Colgate University	4–3	Dartmouth College	ECAC Quarterfinal (Game 1, Best of 3)	March 14, 2003

The longest game in NCAA hockey history was played at Notre Dame in Notre Dame, Indiana, on March 6, 2015. UMass beat Notre Dame, 4–3, in the Hockey East first round with 8:18 left in quintuple overtime. Shane Walsh scored the winning goal just after 1:00 am local time.

The previous longest was played on March 12, 2010. Quinnipiac University beat Union College, 3–2, in the ECAC Quarterfinals, as Greg Holt scored with 9:38 left in quintuple overtime. The 3rd longest game in NCAA hockey history (the longest game in NCAA playoff history) was played on March 27–28, 2021. The University of Minnesota Duluth beat the University of North Dakota 3–2. Luke Mylymok scored the game-winning goal with 17:47 left in quintuple overtime. The 4th longest game in NCAA hockey history was played on March 5, 2006. Yale University beat Union College, 3–2, in the ECAC Hockey League first-round playoff game after 81:35 of overtime. David Meckler scored the winning goal with Yale shorthanded.

The longest game in NCAA Division III hockey history, and the fourth longest in NCAA history overall, began at 7:05 pm on February 27, 2010, and ended at 12:35 am of the following day. Gustavus Adolphus College beat Augsburg College, 6–5, to advance to the MIAC championship game after 78:38 of overtime. Eric Bigham scored the winning goal.

A 2000 NCAA regional final in men's ice hockey between St. Lawrence University and Boston University ended with 63:53 of overtime. Manitoba native and minor hockey buddy of Craig McAulay, Robin Carruthers scored the game-winning goal after four periods of overtime play

A March 30, 1991, game between Northern Michigan University and Boston University ended with Northern Michigan earning an 8–7 victory over Boston University. Unlikely hero Darryl Plandowski scores in the third overtime period and fifth hour of play to give the Wildcats the title.

A March 8, 1997, game between Colorado College and the University of Wisconsin–Madison ended with Colorado College winning, 1–0, after 69:30 of overtime.

A March 14, 2003, ECAC Quarterfinal game between Colgate University and Dartmouth ended, 4–3 for Colgate, after 61:05 in overtime.

On March 26, 2006, the Wisconsin Badgers beat the Cornell Big Red 1–0 at 11:13 into the third overtime at the Midwest Regional Final in the NCAA Tournament at the Resch Center in Green Bay. It was the second-longest NCAA Tournament game in its history and the longest 1–0 game in tournament history. It is currently the ninth-longest game all-time in NCAA Division I history.

A March 11, 2007, game between St. Cloud State University and University of Minnesota Duluth during the first round of the WCHA playoffs ended with SCSU winning, 3–2, after 51:33 of overtime. It is the eighth-longest NCAA Division I game in history.

In the first round of the 2008 WCHA hockey tournament featuring the fourth-seeded Minnesota State University, Mankato Mavericks hosting the seventh-seeded University of Minnesota Golden Gophers, the Friday and Sunday games both went into double overtime, and the Saturday night game went into one overtime. The Gophers prevailed two games to one in the series, winning Saturday and Sunday.

On March 3, 2012, in the first round of the 2012 ECAC Hockey hockey tournament featuring the seventh-seeded Clarkson Golden Knights men's ice hockey team hosting the tenth-seeded RPI Engineers men's ice hockey team, Clarkson beat RPI 4–3 at 13:48 in the third overtime period, after 113:48 of play. It is currently the seventh-longest game all-time in NCAA Division I history.

==== NCAA women ====
On March 10, 1996, New Hampshire defeated Providence, 3–2, in an ECAC Women's Championship game after 85:35 of overtime. (This is not an NCAA record, as the NCAA did not officially recognize women's hockey until the 2001 season; however, it stands as the longest women's college hockey game)

On March 10, 2007, Wisconsin defeated Harvard, 1–0, in an NCAA women's quarterfinal game after 67:09 of overtime at the Kohl Center in Madison WI. Wisconsin went on to win the national championship.

On March 10, 2012, Cornell University defeated Boston University, 8–7, in an NCAA women's quarterfinal game after 59:50 of overtime at Lynah Rink in Ithaca, New York, surpassing the men's game from the previous night as the longest hockey game to be played at the rink.

On March 21, 2010, Minnesota–Duluth defeated Cornell 3–2 in the NCAA championship game, after 59:26 of overtime (119:26 total game time), the longest men's or women's hockey championship game in NCAA history.

==== Canadian Hockey League ====
- The longest game in Memorial Cup history was played on May 23, 2014, in London, Ontario, where in the semi-final game, Curtis Lazar scored at 2:42 of triple overtime as the Edmonton Oil Kings beat the Val-d'Or Foreurs 4–3 to advance to the championship game. The entire overtime lasted 42:42, the overall game time played was 102:42.
- The longest game in WHL & CHL history was played on April 2, 2017, in Victoria, British Columbia, in Game 6 of Round 1 between the Everett Silvertips and Victoria Royals. Cal Babych scored with 8:24 left in quintuple overtime to beat the Royals 3–2 to win the series 4–2. The overtime length was 91:36 while the total game time played was 151:36.

===== QMJHL =====
Overtime		Overtime length (min:sec)	Away team	Score	Home team	Date
1.	5th	86:31	Victoriaville Tigres	2–3	Hull Olympiques	March 19, 1999
2.	5th	81:42	Baie-Comeau Drakkar	2–3	Cape Breton Eagles	April 4, 2025
3.	4th	72:57	Cape Breton Screaming Eagles	3–2	Québec Remparts	April 3, 2009
4.	4th	69:15	Chicoutimi Saguenéens	2–3	Rimouski Océanic	March 23, 2019
5.	4th	67:47	Blainville-Boisbriand Armada	3–2	Moncton Wildcats	April 23, 2026
6.	3rd	56:14	Acadie–Bathurst Titan	4–3	Halifax Mooseheads	May 11, 2022
7.	3rd	54:26	Cape Breton Screaming Eagles	5–4	Drummondville Voltigeurs	March 24, 2018
8.	3rd	52:26	Val-d'Or Foreurs	2–3	Blainville-Boisbriand Armada	April 3, 2016†
9.	3rd	46:37	Acadie–Bathurst Titan	3–4	Baie-Comeau Drakkar	April 21, 2001
10.	3rd	43:50	Hull Olympiques	4–5	Longueuil Collège Français	March 26, 1990
11.	3rd	43:02	Halifax Mooseheads	4–3	Cape Breton Screaming Eagles	April 8, 2008
12.	3rd	43:00	Victoriaville Tigres	4–5	Drummondville Voltigeurs	March 20, 1988
13.	3rd	41:01	Val-d'Or Foreurs	4–3	P.E.I. Rocket	April 1, 2013†
14.	3rd	40:45	Hull Olympiques	5–6	Val-d'Or Foreurs	April 11, 1996
15.	3rd	40:26	Rouyn-Noranda Huskies	6–5	Halifax Mooseheads	March 31, 2017

† Series-Clinching Goal

==== 2007 RBC Cup – Canadian Jr A championship ====
The semi-final game for the 2007 RBC Cup, saw the host Prince George Spruce Kings taking on the Camrose Kodiaks. The game ended up being the longest game in Royal Bank Cup history at 146 minutes and 1 second. The Spruce Kings broke a 2–2 tie just over six minutes into quintuple overtime to win 3–2 and clinch a berth in the RBC Cup Final against the Aurora Tigers. Jason Yuel of the Spruce Kings scored the winner while goaltender Jordan White stopped 91 of 93 shots for the victory.

==== OPJHL ====
On February 10, 2007, the Toronto Jr. Canadiens defeated the Pickering Panthers, 4–3, to take a 2–0 series lead in the first round of the OPJHL playoffs, after 84:32 of the 5th overtime. It is the second longest junior hockey game played sanctioned by Hockey Canada.

==== GHJHL ====
February 1999, the St. Catharines Falcons defeated the Port Colborne Sailors 7–6 to take a 2–1 series lead in the semi-finals of the Golden Horseshoe Jr. B Hockey League playoffs. Peter Lacey scored 11 minutes into quintuple overtime, ending the game at 2:18 am. The game started at 7:30 pm. It is the longest junior hockey game sanctioned by Hockey Canada

==== High school ====
On February 20, 2020, in Black River Falls, Wisconsin, Black River Falls Co-op vs. Viroqua Co-op girls went a total of six overtimes - a combination of 8 and 12 minute overtimes - total elapsed playtime of 122 minutes, 51 seconds, a new US High School Record. Black River Falls won 2–1 in sextuple overtime. Viroqua goalie Abby Severson stopped 108 of 110 shots in the game.

Marquette vs Orchard Lake St Marys went eight overtimes during the Michigan State Ice Hockey Division 1 Championship game before Tournament officials stopped the game in consideration of the health and welfare of the players on March 8, 2008. The 1–1 tie resulted in the two teams being declared co-champions. The game lasted 109 minutes. Ryan Morley Stockton of St. Mary's had a MHSAA-record 58 saves.

In a 1996 FCIAC quarterfinal matchup in Darien, Connecticut, between archrivals Wilton and Ridgefield, Wilton's Bill Lenich scored after 104 minutes of hockey, in the 8th eight-minute overtime period.

The longest game in American high school history was an Aurora High School–Solon High School game in which Aurora won in the eighth overtime period of the Ohio state playoffs. The winning goal was scored with 3:52 left in the 8th overtime (105th minute), setting an American record.

A 2026 12U hockey game in Minnesota between St. Paul and Cottage Grove went to twelve overtimes, for a total game time of 180 minutes. The game was played over the course of three days, and ended when organizers opted to hold a shootout instead of a 13th overtime. Cottage Grove won 2-1.

Since 2015, most state tournaments allow up to 5 overtime periods (4-on-4 after first overtime), after which best-of-3-round shootouts and extra rounds if needed are conducted, to eliminate co-champions.

== See also ==
- Ice hockey rules
- Overtime (sports)
