= Stepanovs =

Family name

Stepanovs (masculine), Stepanova (feminine) is a Latvian-language form of the Russian surname Stepanov. Notable people of the surname include:

- Igors Stepanovs
- Igors Stepanovs (footballer, born 1966)
- Vasilijs Stepanovs
