= 2004 Russian First Division =

Russian First Division
- Season: 2004
- Champions: Terek Grozny
- Promoted: Terek Grozny; Tom Tomsk
- Relegated: Uralan Elista; Neftekhimik Nizhnekamsk; Baltika Kaliningrad; Lisma-Mordovia Saransk; SOYUZ-Gazprom Izhevsk
- Top goalscorer: Andrei Fedkov (38)

The 2004 Russian First Division was the 13th edition of Russian First Division. There were 22 teams.

== Teams ==
Location of teams in 2003 Russian First Division

Team	Place
Anzhi Makhachkala	Makhachkala
Arsenal Tula	Tula
Baltika Kaliningrad	Kaliningrad
Chernomorets Novorossiysk	Novorossiysk
Dynamo Bryansk	Bryansk
Dynamo Makhachkala	Makhachkala
KAMAZ	Naberezhnye Chelny
Khimki	Khimki
Lokomotiv Chita	Chita
Luch-Energiya Vladivostok	Vladivostok
Metallurg Lipetsk	Lipetsk

Team	Place
Metallurg Novokuznetsk	Novokuznetsk
Lisma-Mordovia Saransk	Saransk
Neftekhimik Nizhnekamsk	Nizhnekamsk
Oryol	Oryol
SKA-Energiya Khabarovsk	Khabarovsk
Sokol Saratov	Saratov
SOYUZ-Gazprom Izhevsk	Izhevsk
Spartak Nalchik	Nalchik
Terek Grozny	Grozny
Tom Tomsk	Tomsk
Uralan Elista	Elista

== Standings ==
Pos	Team	Pld	W	D	L	GF	GA	GD	Pts	Promotion or relegation
1	Terek Grozny (C, P)	42	32	4	6	70	22	+48	100	Promotion to Premier League
2	Tom Tomsk (P)	42	27	5	10	70	38	+32	86	Promotion to Premier League
3	Sokol Saratov	42	25	8	9	69	38	+31	83	
4	KAMAZ Naberezhnye Chelny	42	19	12	11	52	49	+3	69	
5	Khimki	42	17	10	15	39	33	+6	61	
6	Oryol	42	16	13	13	37	34	+3	61 (Note: Head-to-head record: Oryol – SKA 1–0, SKA – Oryol 0–2.)	
7	SKA-Khabarovsk	42	16	13	13	42	37	+5	61	
8	Anzhi Makhachkala	42	16	12	14	50	53	−3	60	
9	Metallurg Lipetsk	42	15	15	12	48	43	+5	60	
10	Lokomotiv Chita	42	17	8	17	47	48	−1	59	
11	Dynamo Makhachkala	42	16	11	15	44	48	−4	59	
12	Spartak Nalchik	42	16	10	16	53	46	+7	58	
13	Arsenal Tula (R)	42	15	13	14	39	32	+7	58	Relegation to Second Division (Note: Arsenal Tula were relegated to Second Division because they didn't get a license for a next season.)
14	Luch-Energiya Vladivostok	42	15	11	16	50	50	0	56	
15	Dynamo Bryansk	42	14	13	15	49	51	−2	55	
16	Metallurg-Kuzbass Novokuznetsk	42	14	10	18	53	53	0	52	
17	Chernomorets Novorossiysk (R)	42	13	12	17	47	44	+3	51	Relegation to Amateur Football League (Note: Chernomorets Novorossiysk were relegated to Amateur Football League because they didn't get a license for a next season.)
18	Uralan Elista (R)	42	13	11	18	48	57	−9	50	Relegation to Second Division
19	Neftekhimik Nizhnekamsk (R)	42	11	12	19	38	57	−19	45	Relegation to Second Division
20	Baltika Kaliningrad (R)	42	10	9	23	37	60	−23	39	Relegation to Second Division
21	Lisma-Mordovia Saransk (R)	42	5	11	26	24	62	−38	26	Relegation to Second Division
22	SOYUZ-Gazprom Izhevsk (R)	42	5	7	30	40	91	−51	22	Relegation to Second Division

Source: PFL, RSSSF
Rules for classification: 1st points; 2nd matches won; 3rd head-to-head (points, matches won, goal difference, goals scored, away goals scored); 4th goal difference; 5th goals scored; 6th away goals scored
(C) Champions; (P) Promoted; (R) Relegated

== Results ==
Home \ Away	ANZ	ARS	BAL	CHE	DBR	DMK	KAM	KHI	LCH	LUC	MTL	MTK	MOR	NEF	ORY	SKA	SOK	SGI	SPN	TER	TOM	URE
Anzhi Makhachkala		2–0	1–0	1–1	3–0	0–0	1–3	2–0	0–1	3–2	0–0	1–0	2–0	0–2	1–2	0–0	1–1	2–1	2–1	2–1	1–0	1–1
Arsenal Tula	1–2		1–0	2–0	0–0	3–2	0–0	0–0	2–0	0–1	0–0	0–0	2–0	1–1	4–0	3–0	0–1	3–1	2–1	1–0	0–1	1–0
Baltika Kaliningrad	3–3	2–1		1–0	1–1	2–1	0–2	0–1	1–0	3–2	1–1	2–3	1–0	2–2	0–0	1–3	0–0	3–2	2–3	0–3	0–1	3–0
Chernomorets Novorossiysk	5–0	2–1	1–0		5–0	3–1	3–0	0–1	0–0	1–0	1–1	0–0	2–0	3–1	0–2	2–1	0–0	3–0	2–0	0–2	1–0	1–1
Dynamo Bryansk	1–1	1–2	3–0	2–0		0–1	0–2	1–0	1–0	0–0	0–0	1–2	2–0	0–0	1–0	1–1	3–3	2–0	2–1	0–1	1–1	6–0
Dynamo Makhachkala	2–1	2–1	2–0	2–0	1–0		1–1	1–3	0–0	2–1	3–0	1–0	1–1	1–3	1–0	1–0	1–0	4–1	2–1	1–2	0–0	1–2
KAMAZ	0–0	2–0	2–1	1–1	3–1	1–1		1–0	0–0	1–1	0–1	0–2	1–0	2–1	2–1	2–2	2–2	0–0	0–3	0–4	1–0	1–1
Khimki	2–1	2–0	2–0	1–1	1–2	3–0	0–1		2–0	0–0	1–1	1–0	2–0	0–0	0–0	0–1	0–1	3–1	0–0	0–2	1–0	1–2
Lokomotiv Chita	2–0	0–2	1–1	2–1	3–1	1–1	2–4	1–0		2–1	4–3	1–0	5–0	1–0	1–0	1–1	1–2	3–1	1–1	1–2	3–2	2–1
Luch-Energiya Vladivostok	1–0	0–0	0–0	4–2	1–0	4–0	0–1	1–2	1–0		1–1	3–0	3–0	0–1	1–1	1–0	2–1	4–0	0–0	1–0	1–2	5–3
Metallurg Lipetsk	1–2	2–0	1–0	1–0	2–0	0–1	4–0	2–1	2–1	0–3		0–0	1–0	1–2	2–0	0–0	2–2	4–2	0–1	1–1	0–0	0–4
Metallurg-Kuzbass	0–1	1–1	3–1	2–1	0–2	4–0	5–1	3–1	0–1	1–2	2–2		0–0	0–1	0–0	0–1	0–1	2–1	2–1	0–0	1–2	4–2
Lisma-Mordovia Saransk	1–3	0–0	2–2	0–0	1–1	0–2	0–2	0–1	0–1	4–1	0–1	0–1		4–1	2–1	1–1	2–3	1–1	2–1	0–1	0–1	0–0
Neftekhimik Nizhnekamsk	3–1	1–1	2–0	0–0	0–1	1–1	0–2	1–2	0–0	1–1	1–4	2–1	0–1		2–2	0–2	3–0	1–2	0–1	0–1	0–2	1–0
Oryol	0–0	1–0	0–1	2–2	0–2	1–0	1–0	0–1	1–0	0–0	1–1	3–1	0–0	1–1		1–0	3–0	1–0	2–1	0–1	1–0	3–1
SKA-Khabarovsk	2–0	0–0	0–2	1–0	2–0	1–0	1–1	1–1	1–2	1–1	1–2	1–1	1–0	3–0	0–2		0–0	2–1	2–1	1–0	0–1	2–0
Sokol Saratov	3–1	0–1	2–0	3–0	1–1	4–2	1–0	2–0	2–0	1–0	2–0	3–0	1–0	4–0	1–0	3–2		4–0	3–1	2–1	2–0	2–1
SOYUZ-Gazprom Izhevsk	0–1	0–2	2–0	0–0	2–3	0–0	3–5	1–1	1–0	6–0	0–2	2–3	1–1	3–1	0–1	0–1	0–4		1–1	1–3	0–4	0–1
Spartak Nalchik	0–0	1–0	2–0	2–1	2–2	0–0	2–3	0–1	1–0	1–0	2–1	3–2	2–0	4–0	0–0	0–0	3–2	4–1		0–0	1–2	1–0
Terek Grozny	1–0	2–0	1–0	2–0	3–1	1–0	2–1	0–0	4–1	4–0	1–0	3–4	5–0	1–0	2–0	1–0	1–0	2–0	2–1		2–1	2–1
Tom Tomsk	4–2	1–1	2–1	3–2	2–0	2–1	1–0	1–0	4–2	1–0	2–1	3–2	2–1	1–1	1–2	3–1	3–0	8–2	3–2	0–1		1–0
Uralan Elista	5–5	0–0	1–0	1–0	3–3	0–0	0–1	2–1	1–0	4–0	0–0	1–1	3–0	0–1	1–1	1–2	1–0	1–0	1–0	1–2	0–2	

Source: PFL (in Russian)
Legend: Blue = home team win; Yellow = draw; Red = away team win.

== Top goalscorers ==
Rank	Player	Team	Goals
1	(Russia) Andrei Fedkov	Terek	38
2	(Russia) Denis Kiselyov	Tom	17
3	(Russia) Sergey Korovushkin	Arsenal	16
4	(Russia) Beslan Ajinjal	Sokol	15
4	(Belarus) Pyotr Kachura	Sokol	15
6	(Russia) Yevgeni Alkhimov	Lokomotiv (Ch)	14
6	(Russia) Aleksandr Antipenko	Tom	14
6	(Russia) Shamil Asildarov	Dynamo (Mkh)	14
9	(Russia) Sergei Ryzhikh	SKA-Khabarovsk	13
9	(Ukraine) Oleksandr Stepanov	Metallurg-Kuzbass	13

== See also ==
- 2004 Russian Premier League
