= Konev =

Konev (Russian: Конев and Bulgarian, Ukrainian: Конєв from конь or кон meaning horse) is a Russian, Bulgarian or Ukrainian masculine surname, its feminine counterpart is Koneva. It may refer to:

- Anatoly Konev (1921–1965), Russian basketball player
- Andrei Konev (born 1989), Russian ice hockey defenceman
- Ekaterina Koneva (born 1988), Russian triple jumper
- Ivan Konev (1897–1973), Soviet military commander
- Ivan Nikitich Konev (1899–1983), Soviet Major General
- Natalya Koneva
- Vladimir Konev
