= Vladimir Stepanov =

Vladimir Stepanov may refer to

- Vladimir Stepanov (armwrestler) (born 1958), Russian armwrestler
- Vladimir Stepanov (politician) (1927–2022), Soviet diplomat and intelligence officer
- Vladimir Stepanov (dancer) (1866–1896), Russian ballet dancer
