= 27th Rifle Division =

- Active: I Formation: 1918–1941; II Formation: 1941–1945
- Country: Soviet Union
- Branch: Red Army
- Type: Infantry
- Size: Division
- Engagements: Russian Civil War: Eastern Front of the Russian Civil War; Kronstadt rebellion; Polish-Soviet War; World War II: Soviet invasion of Poland; Battle of Bialystok-Minsk; Continuation War; East Pomeranian Offensive
- Decorations: Honorary Revolutionary Red Banner (2) (1st formation); Order of the Red Banner (2nd formation)
- Battle honours: Omsk (1st formation) Named for the Italian Proletariat (1st formation) Gdynia (2nd formation)

Commanders
- Notable commanders: Vitovt Putna; Kuzma Podlas

External image
- 27th Rifle Division
- 27th Rifle Division in 1920

The 27th Rifle Division (Russian: 27-я стрелковая дивизия) was a tactical unit in the Red Army of Soviet Russia and then the Soviet Union, active between 1918 and 1945. First formed during the Russian Civil War on November 3, 1918, as part of 5th Red Army. Commanded by Vitovt Putna, it was transferred to the 16th Red Army in 1920, and took part in the Polish–Soviet War. Defeated in the battles of Radzymin and Ossów (collectively known as the Battle of Warsaw), it practically ceased to exist.

Reformed in Russia, it returned to Poland in 1939 and took part in the Soviet invasion of Poland as part of the 3rd Army's 4th Rifle Corps, reaching Parafianów and the line of Serwecz River on September 18, 1939. It was then stationed in Soviet-occupied Poland with its headquarters in Suchowola and regiments stationed in Augustów, Grajewo and Suchowola. By 2 October 1939, the division had been subordinated to the 16th Rifle Corps of the 11th Army.

On 22 June 1941, the division was again part of 4th Rifle Corps, 3rd Army (Soviet Union), itself part of the Western Special Military District which quickly became the Western Front, under the command of Major General Aleksandr Stepanov. During Operation Barbarossa, the division was attacked by the German 256th and 162nd Infantry Divisions. Its regiments fought separately and retreated eastwards, towards Sokółka. By June 24 the division lost 40% of its soldiers and the following day unsuccessfully tried to defend the Swisłocz river line. In accordance with orders, it defended the line until the end of the day when it was annihilated. Only small groups of soldiers from the division reached Soviet lines in July and early August. The division was officially disbanded on September 19, 1941.

The second formation of the division was recreated August 1941 at Arkhangelsk, (renamed from Rebolsky Direction Division on September 24, 1941) and the division subsequently fought against the Finnish Army. The division was subordinated to the 26th Army of the Karelian Front in May 1942, and was deployed in the far north of Russia until the end of 1944. It was awarded the Order of the Red Banner on 5 April for its actions in the capture of Stolp. The unit completed the war with the 19th Army of the 2nd Belorussian Front in May 1945.

27th Rifle Division subordination in the Russo-German War
Date assigned	Rifle Corps	Army	Front (or reserve)
Jun 1941	4th	3rd	Western
Sep 1941	-	7th	Karelian
Oct 1941	-	Kem Op. Group	Karelian
May 1942	-	26th	Karelian
Apr 1944	-	32nd	Karelian
Sep 1944	127th Light	32nd	Karelian
Oct 1944	132nd	26th	Karelian
Dec 1944	132nd	19th	Reserve
Feb 1945	132nd	19th	2nd Belorussian

Postwar, the division was stationed in Poland near Gdynia with the Northern Group of Forces and disbanded in the summer of 1945.
