= Vasiliy Stepanov =

Vasiliy Stepanov may refer to:

- Vasiliy Stepanov (actor) (born 1986), Russian actor
- Vasiliy Stepanov (canoeist), Soviet canoer
- Vasilijs Stepanovs (1927–2011), Soviet weightlifter
