= Aleksandr Stepanov (footballer, born 1981) =

Russian footballer

Personal information
- Full name: Aleksandr Sergeyevich Stepanov
- Date of birth: 31 December 1981 (age 44)
- Place of birth: Taganrog, Russian SFSR
- Height: 1.90 m (6 ft 3 in)
- Position: Defender

Youth career
- Torpedo Taganrog

Senior career*
| Years | Team | Apps | (Gls) |
| 1999–2000 | Torpedo Taganrog | 66 | (2) |
| 2001–2002 | Lokomotiv Liski | 60 | (2) |
| 2004 | Reutov | 8 | (0) |
| 2004 | Torpedo-SKA Minsk | 2 | (0) |
| 2005 | TagMet Taganrog | 25 | (5) |
| 2006–2010 | Taganrog | 136 | (9) |
- * Club domestic league appearances and goals

Aleksandr Sergeyevich Stepanov (Russian: Александр Серге́евич Степанов; born 31 December 1981) is a Russian former professional football player.
