= Alexander Stepanov (physicist) =

Russian physicist (1908–1972)

Alexander Vasilievich Stepanov (Russian: Александр Васильевич Степанов; August 26, 1908 – May 16, 1972) was a Soviet physicist and material scientist who pioneered the study of crystal deformation, the molecular structures of materials, studies on stress and breakage. He contributed to the development of composite materials. His technique for producing what are called shaped crystals was influential in the field of material studies and continues to be used, known as the "Stepanov method".

== Life and work ==
Stepanov was born in St. Petersburg where his father was a building technician. He graduated from the Leningrad Polytechnic Institute in 1930. He worked at the laboratory of Ivan Obreimov at Leningrad, followed by Kharkiv, and still later at the lab of Abram Ioffe. He spent some time at the optics laboratory headed by V. K. Fredericks. In 1937 he worked at the Pokrovskii Pedagogical Institute at Leningrad. He worked on growing perfect crystals to examine their structures, and mechanical properties including elasticity, strength, anisotropy and other aspects of solids. He developed optical polarization approaches to examine stresses. He introduced the use of silver chloride as a model material for study. He attempted to extend his findings to develop a theory on fracture of materials including natural structures like wood and bones. He noted changes in thermal conductivity under shear stresses and connected melt heat and strain and in 1933 he noted the phenomenon of charge dislocation caused by plastic deformation of ionic crystals. In the 1940s he developed methods to produce monocrystal plates of zinc, aluminium and other metals. His methods have been used subsequently in the manufacture of semiconductor materials.

Stepanov developed a method for producing crystals by pulling shapes from melts, supposedly inspired by observations of water striders on the surface of water. He used plates with holes on the surface of metal melts to pull metal profiles with cross sections formed in the shapes of the holes. He believed that this would preserve crystal structure unlike methods involving rolling and extrusion. He attempted to get a Russian patent for this in 1940 and it was refused with claims that it was the same as Foucault's method for glass sheet pulling.

Stepanov was a keen sportsman, took part in alpine skiing, played tennis and was a referee at soccer. He died in Crimea while on a Spring holiday for water skiing.
