= Larisa Stepanova =

Russian politician (born 1968)

- Лариса Степанова

Member of the Legislative Assembly of the Republic of Karelia
- In office 22 December 2011 – 30 September 2016

Personal details
- Born: 9 August 1968 (age 58) Ilyinsky, Karelian ASSR, Russian SFSR, USSR
- Education: Petrozavodsk State University
- Profession: Politician, teacher

Larisa Nikolayevna Stepanova (Russian: Лариса Николаевна Степанова; born 9 August 1968) is a Russian teacher and politician who served as a member of the Legislative Assembly of the Republic of Karelia from 2011 to 2016.
