= Sergei Stepanov =

Sergei (or Sergey) Stepanov may refer to:

- Sergei Aleksandrovich Stepanov (born 1941), Russian mathematician
- Sergei Stepanov (footballer), born 1976
- Sergei Stepanov (politician) from Transnistria
- Sergey Stepanov (musician) (better known as "Epic Sax Guy"), a saxophonist, member of the SunStroke Project
