= Aleksandr Stepanov (general) =

Red Army general (1893–1941)

Aleksandr Mikhailovich Stepanov
- Stepanov, 1940
- Born: 30 August 1893; Pepel, Kostroma Governorate, Russian Empire
- Died: 11 August 1941 (aged 47) near Yartsevo, Smolensk Oblast, Soviet Union
- Military career
- Allegiance: Russian Empire; Russian SFSR; Soviet Union
- Branch: Imperial Russian Army; Red Army
- Service years: 1914–1917; 1918–1941
- Rank: Major general
- Commands: 14th Rifle Division; 27th Rifle Division
- Conflicts: World War I; Russian Civil War; Polish–Soviet War; Winter War; World War II
- Awards: Order of Lenin; Order of the Red Banner; Order of the Red Star (2)

Aleksandr Mikhailovich Stepanov (Russian: Алекса́ндр Миха́йлович Степа́нов; 30 August 1893 – 11 August 1941) was a Red Army major general.

Stepanov rose from private to officer during World War I and held brigade command during the Russian Civil War. Between the wars, he held command and staff positions and was decorated for his actions in the Winter War. He commanded the 27th Rifle Division in Belarus during the Battle of Białystok–Minsk and was killed in action while escaping from encirclement.

== Early life, World War I, and Russian Civil War ==
Stepanov was born on 30 August 1893 to a Russian peasant family in the village of Pepel, Soligalichsky Uyezd, Kostroma Governorate. He graduated from primary school and a city school before working at the Petrograd Post Office as a postal clerk. During World War I, Stepanov was mobilized into the Imperial Russian Army in September 1914 and sent to the Krasnoye Selo Reserve Rifle Battalion of the Petrograd Military District as a private. In April 1915 he became a junker at the Oranienbaum School of Praporshchiks, graduating as a praporshchik (ensign) in July of that year. Stepanov was sent to the Western Front, where he served as a junior officer and company commander with the 272nd Infantry Regiment of the 68th Infantry Division. He was awarded three orders for his actions and rose to the rank of staff captain. Due to illness, he was hospitalized for a year beginning in August 1917.

After leaving the hospital, Stepanov joined the Red Army during the Russian Civil War on 2 September 1918 and was appointed a vsevobuch military training instructor of the Soligalichsky Uyezd military commissariat. From February 1919 he commanded the Communist Regiment of the 2nd Brigade of the 29th Rifle Division of the 3rd Army, leading it on fighting on the Eastern Front against the White forces of Alexander Kolchak in the areas of Tyumen, Ishim, Perm, and Glazov. After taking command of the brigade in August, he and the division where relocated to the Western Front for the Polish–Soviet War. In the latter, they fought as part of the southern group of the 15th Army in the area of Lepel, Vileyka, Borisov, Molodechno, and Lida.

After the end of the Polish–Soviet War, Stepanov commanded the Separate Reserve Rifle Regiment of the 3rd Army at Vitebsk, then became assistant commander of the 5th Saratov Rifle Division. From January 1921 he served as chief of the junior advanced courses of the Western Front under the division, and in November became commander of its 37th Rifle Regiment. With the unit, Stepanov participated in the elimination of anti-Soviet forces in the border area.

== Interwar period ==
After the end of the war, Stepanov continued to serve with the 5th Rifle Division, becoming assistant commander of its 13th RIfle Regiment in June 1922 and chief of staff of its 15th Rifle Regiment in August 1923. Appointed chief of the intelligence department of the staff of the 4th Rifle Corps in October 1925, Stepanov was sent to study at the Intelligence Courses of Improvement for Command Personnel under the Intelligence Directorate. After completing the courses in September 1927, he was sent to the Separate Red Banner Caucasus Army, being appointed commander of the 1st Caucasian Rifle Regiment of the 1st Caucasian Rifle Division in Batumi. His service there proved brief as he was transferred to the Moscow Military District in January 1928 to command the 54th Rifle Regiment of the 18th Rifle Division at Rostov.

Having completed the Vystrel course in 1930, Stepanov served as assistant chief of staff of the 3rd Rifle Corps in Ivanovo from December 1931. He became chief of staff of the 14th Rifle Division at Vologda in July 1937 and commanded the division from May 1939, being awarded the Order of the Red Star in 1938 and promoted to kombrig on 19 April 1939. During the Winter War he fought with the 8th Army as assistant commander of the 1st Rifle Corps. For his performance, Stepanov was awarded the Order of the Red Banner on 22 May 1940. Appointed commander of the 27th Rifle Division in May, he became a major general on 4 June when the Red Army introduced general officer ranks, and was awarded a second Order of the Red Star in February 1941.

== World War II ==
The division was assigned to the 4th Rifle Corps of the 3rd Army and stationed in the area of Augustów. The day before Operation Barbarossa began on 22 June, Stepanov reluctantly agreed to the proposal of the commander of his 345th Rifle Regiment, Colonel V. K. Solodovnikov, that the latter be allowed to move his regiment forward to prepared defensive positions. After Operation Barbarossa began, Stepanov led the division in the Battle of Białystok–Minsk. On 22 and 23 June the division defended in the area of Augustów against the attacks of the German 162nd Infantry Division. It was unable to hold its positions and on 23 June retreated 30 kilometers (19 mi) to the south, where it attempted to hold positions. With the corps, the 27th was encircled near the Shchara and suffered heavy losses to German air and tank attacks. By 29 June both the division and corps were effectively destroyed. Stepanov led the remnants of the division out of the encirclement, escaping with General Ivan Boldin's group. As Boldin's group broke out of the encirclement near Yartsevo on 11 August, Stepanov was killed by a shell fragment. He was posthumously awarded the Order of Lenin on 15 August; Boldin's recommendation for the award read simply "for courage in the battles between 22 and 27 June [he] is deserving of the Order of Lenin". Stepanov was buried in the center of the Neyelovsky sovkhoz, Safonovsky District, Smolensk Oblast.

== Awards and honors ==
Stepanov was a recipient of the following decorations, in addition to an honorary weapon:

- Order of Lenin
- Order of the Red Banner
- Order of the Red Star (2)
- Jubilee Medal "XX Years of the Workers' and Peasants' Red Army"
