= Vladimir Stepanov (dancer) =

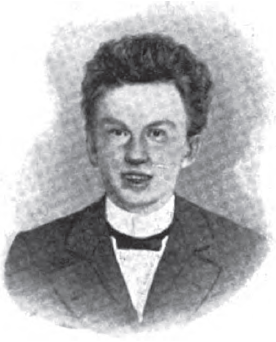
Vladímir Stepànov

Vladimir Ivanovich Stepanov (1866–1896), was a dancer at the Mariinsky Theater in Saint Petersburg. His book, The Alphabet of Movements of the Human Body (French: L'Alphabet des Mouvements du Corps Humain) was published in Paris in 1892. The book describes a notation that encodes dance movements using musical notes instead of pictographs or abstract symbols. Stepanov breaks complex movements down to elementary moves made by individual body parts, enciphering these basic moves as notes. This method of dance notation, improved by Alexander Gorsky, notated many ballets from choreographer Marius Petipa. Today, this method is preserved in the Harvard University Library Theatre Collection and is known as the Sergeyev Collection.

Stepanov wrote his book from an anatomical perspective. The movements were written in terms of joints of the body, along with flexion, extension, rotation, direction, and adduction. After taking an anatomy course, he continued his studies in Paris. Once it was adopted by the St. Petersburg school, Stepanov was given the title Instructor in Movement Analysis and Notation; however, he died at age 29. The system continued to develop following his death.

After Stepanov's death, Alexander Gorsky printed Table of Signs in Stepanov notation. This publication was a slightly enhanced version of Stepanov's original work. Many other variations of Stepanov notation were made following this, such as Conte notation and Nicholas notation.

== Stepanov notation ==
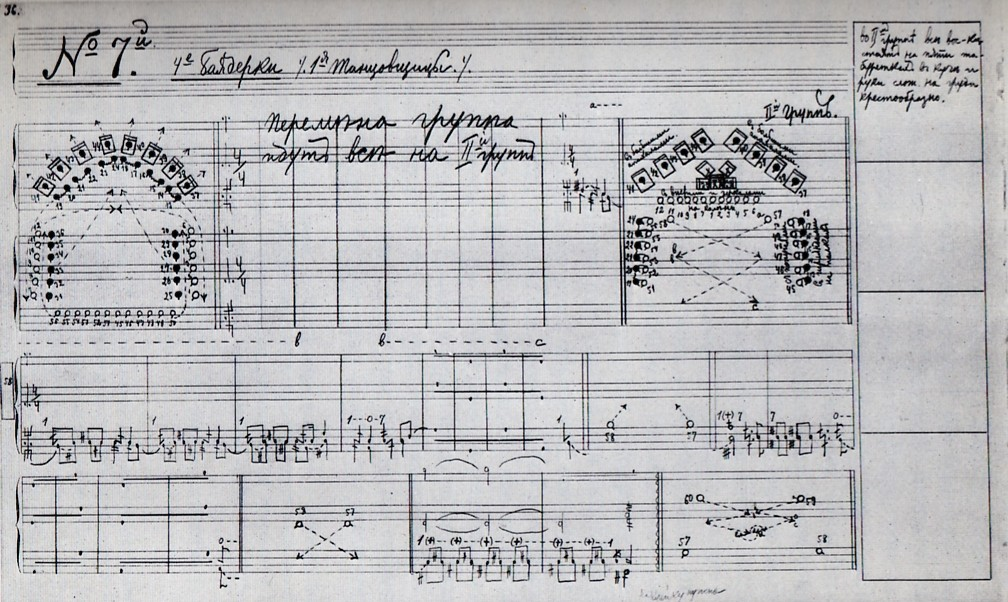
An example of Stepanov-notated choreography for La Bayadère, circa 1900

In his publication of Stepanov's method, Alexander Gorsky stated: "Poses or Movement lasting two units of time we notate with signs called halves (½) as they are made up of two quarters. Poses or movements lasting four units are notated with two half notes connected by arches." In Stepanov notation, downturns can be written in terms of numbers, putting the different numbers of turns in the same order and pattern the dancer executes them. For example, if the numbers 1, 2, and 3 were written in a straight line, then the dancer would similarly turn three times in a straight line. As another example, if the numbers 0, 1, 2, 3, 4, and 5 are written in a circle, with 0 at the top and the numbers in increasing order clockwise around the circle, the dancer does 5 turns while walking in a clockwise circle. With Stepanov notation, arm movements are written as symbols similar in appearance to music notes with streaks around them. The streaks indicate how the dancer is supposed to move his/her arms and the notes indicate on which beat each arm movement is to occur. A space on the paper specifies the audience's location.

=== Advantages ===
Stepanov's system does not require the study of many symbols to understand it. This system makes it possible to show more than a single movement at a time. Overall, it has been claimed to be a good approach to describing body movement.

=== Disadvantages ===
Stepanov notation encounters difficulty in describing body direction as it utilizes a system of relative "greater than" and "less than" positions relative to the current facing of the dancer, requiring them to memorize the meanings of these terms in relation to every position in the dance. Some might also call the translation from some manuscripts for ballet steps crude due to the difficulty of translating an anatomical movement onto the paper.
