= Oleksandr Stepanov =

Ukrainian footballer

Personal information
- Full name: Oleksandr Mykhaylovych Stepanov
- Date of birth: 26 May 1983 (age 43)
- Place of birth: Chernivtsi, Ukrainian SSR
- Height: 1.86 m (6 ft 1 in)
- Position: Forward

Senior career*
Years	Team	Apps	(Gls)
2001–2002	FSC Bukovyna Chernivtsi	41	(5)
2001	FC Bukovyna-2 Chernivtsi	4	(2)
2002	FC Saturn-REN-TV Moscow Oblast	0	(0)
2003	FC Spartak-Alania Vladikavkaz	7	(1)
2003–2004	FC Metallurg-Kuzbass Novokuznetsk	50	(17)
2008	Rakuunat		
2009	FC Zirka Kirovohrad	10	(1)
- * Club domestic league appearances and goals

Oleksandr Mykolayovych Stepanov (Ukrainian: Олександр Миколайович Степанов; born 26 May 1983) is a former Ukrainian football player.

Stepanov debuted on 21 March 2001 by coming as a substitute in the Ukrainian First League against FC Chornomorets Odesa. Soon after Bukovyna relegated to the third tier, in 2002 Stepanov moved Russia where he joined Saturn Ramenskoye playing at the top level. However, he only played for the club's reserve squad. On 16 March 2003 Stepanov debuted at the Russian Premier League by coming as a substitute for FC Spartak-Alania Vladikavkaz in a game against FC Dynamo Moscow. The same year he was transferred out to Kuzbass.

In 2008 Stepanov reappeared in Finland playing for the third-tier team and in 2008 moved back to Ukraine where he tried his skills in futsal by playing for his hometown club Merkuriy Chernivtsi. In spring of 2009 he joined struggling FC Zirka Kirovohrad.
