= Alexander Stepanov (ice hockey) =

Russian ice hockey player

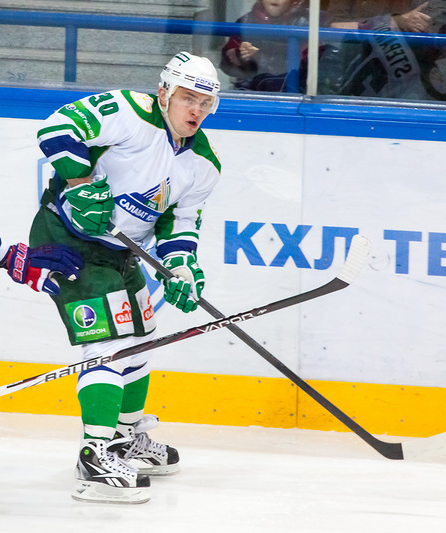
- Born: April 26, 1979 (age 47) Moscow, Russian SFSR, Soviet Union
- Height: 5 ft 9 in (175 cm)
- Weight: 220 lb (100 kg; 15 st 10 lb)
- Position: Right wing
- Shoots: Left
- KHL team Former teams: Severstal Cherepovets; Ak Bars Kazan; HC Dynamo Moscow
- Playing career: 1998–present

Aleksandr Aleksandrovich Stepanov (Russian: Александр Александрович Степанов; born April 26, 1979) is a Russian ice hockey forward who currently plays for Severstal Cherepovets of the Kontinental Hockey League.

== Honors ==
- Russian championship: 2000, 2005, 2006
- European Champions cup: 2006, 2007
