= Andrei Konev =

- Born: 26 January 1989 (age 37) Miass, Russian SFSR, Soviet Union
- Height: 6 ft 1 in (185 cm)
- Weight: 192 lb (87 kg; 13 st 10 lb)
- Position: Defence
- team Former teams: Free Agent; Traktor Chelyabinsk; Lokomotiv Yaroslavl; Salavat Yulaev Ufa; HC Donbass; HC Sibir Novosibirsk; Severstal Cherepovets; Admiral Vladivostok
- Playing career: 2007–present

Andrei Konev (born 26 January 1989) is a former professional ice hockey defenceman who most recently played for PSK Sakhalin of Asia League Ice Hockey (ALIH). He originally played in the KHL with Traktor Chelyabinsk.
