= Vasilijs Stepanovs =

Soviet weightlifter (1927–2011)

Personal information
- Born: 1927 Leningrad, Russian SFSR, Soviet Union
- Died: 8 April 2011 (aged 83–84)

Sport
- Sport: Weightlifting
- Club: Dynamo Riga
Medal record
Representing Soviet Union
Olympic Games
Silver medal – second place	1956 Melbourne	Light heavyweight
World Weightlifting Championships
Silver medal – second place	1955 Munich	Light heavyweight
European Weightlifting Championships
Gold medal – first place	1955 Munich	Light heavyweight

Vasilijs Stepanovs (3 March, 28 May or 12 December 1927 – 8 April 2011) was a Soviet weightlifter. He was born in Russia as Vasily Matveyevich Stepanov (Russian: Василий Матвеевич Степанов), but later settled in Latvia, after serving with the Soviet Baltic Fleet there.

Stepanovs took up weightlifting in 1948, and in 1953 won the Soviet middleweight title. He then moved to the light-heavyweight class and won the 1955 European and 1956 Soviet titles. He finished second at the 1955 World Championships and 1956 Olympics, both times behind Tommy Kono. After the Olympics he progressed to the middle-heavyweight division and set four ratified world records in the press between 1958 and 1962. In retirement he trained weightlifters in Riga, Latvia.
