= Hesse House =

Historic apartment building in Pskov, Russia

- The street façade in 2022

General information
- Architectural style: Renaissance Revival
- Location: Pskov, Russia, 12 Oktyabrsky Prospekt
- Completed: By 1897

Technical details
- Floor count: 4

Design and construction
- Architect: Fyodor Nesturkh

Hesse House (Russian: Дом Гессе) is a historic apartment building at 12 Oktyabrsky Prospekt in Pskov, Russia. It was designed by the city architect Fyodor Nesturkh for the merchant and insurance agent August Hesse. Built in the mid-1890s and completed by 1897, it combined rented apartments with commercial premises. Its four-storey main block has a Renaissance Revival façade. The building is a cultural heritage site of regional significance.

== Construction ==
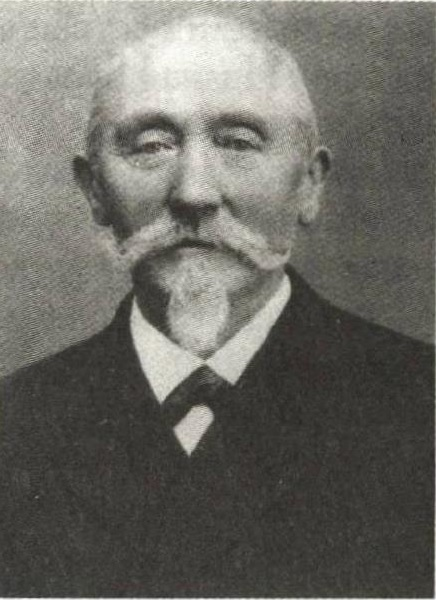
August Hesse, who commissioned the building

August Hesse was an insurance agent, merchant and member of the Pskov city duma. In the mid-1890s he lent the merchant S. I. Kirillov 25,000 roubles against a tannery. When Kirillov could not repay the loan, Hesse acquired the factory and entered the merchant estate.

In 1895, according to the library biography, Hesse inherited a property on Sergievskaya Street, now Oktyabrsky Prospekt. (Note: Pleskov places the inheritance in the early 1890s, rather than specifically in 1895.) It contained an old single-storey house and two wings. He had the earlier buildings demolished and commissioned Nesturkh to design a larger building for residential and commercial use. The street frontage was narrow, with room for plainer wings behind the main block. Pleskov dates Nesturkh’s design to 1895, while the library’s house history gives 1896. Construction was supervised by the architect. Hesse had moved his insurance office into the building by November 1896, and the local newspaper described the house in February 1897. The Pskovsky gorodskoy listok praised it as an example of Nesturkh’s work that had improved the appearance of Sergievskaya Street.

The ground floor contained shops, while the upper three floors housed apartments. Hesse and his family occupied one apartment, and he also established his insurance office in the building. The rear wings provided additional residential and office space. Early commercial tenants included a jewellery and watch shop and Ignaty Robachevsky's Tabachny Bazar tobacco shop. The provincial directory for 1905–1906 also lists the Evangelical Lutheran girls’ school, which Hesse supported, at this address.

=== Sergievskaya Street ===
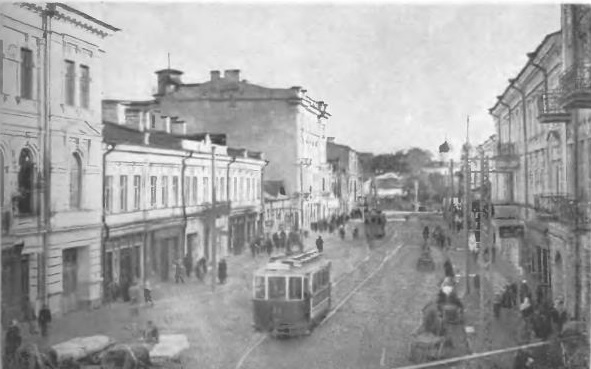
A tram on Sergievskaya Street in the early twentieth century; the service opened in 1912

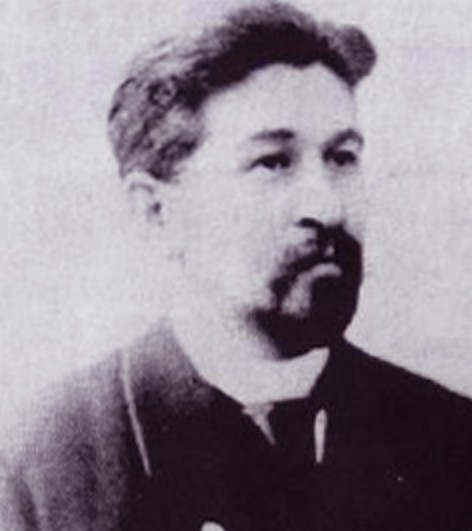
Fyodor Nesturkh during his time as Pskov city architect

Sergievskaya Street, formerly Trupekhovskaya, took its name from the Church of St Sergius of Zaluzhye, in the courtyard of what is now 15 Oktyabrsky Prospekt. Its importance grew with the construction of the Dinaburg highway under Nicholas I and the connecting road from the street to that route. By the late nineteenth century it was one of Pskov’s two principal streets. The Pskov–Riga Railway opened in 1889; the station and railway bridge over the Velikaya contributed to traffic in this part of the city. Electric trams followed in January 1912.

The street contained merchants’ houses, shops and hotels, as well as the ironmongers’ row of the Gostiny Dvor shopping arcade. New buildings, many of three storeys, included those of the Lokhov, Gladkov, Geldt, Dorofeyev and Medem families on one side, and Vickengeyser, the Land Bank, Shpink, Safyanshchikov, another Geldt property and Potashyov on the other. This commercial setting formed the background to Hesse’s investment in a large rental building.

== Architecture ==
Hesse House combines the eclectic architecture of the late nineteenth century with a Renaissance Revival street façade. The Pleskov architectural account describes it as Pskov's first four-storey residential building of that period. The compact site contains a main block with a basement and two rear wings.

The main block is roughly rectangular and follows the street's building line beneath a pitched roof. A four-storey wing with a single-pitch roof occupies the north-western part of the courtyard; a smaller, three-storey wing, also with a single-pitch roof, stands to the north-east.

=== Street façade ===
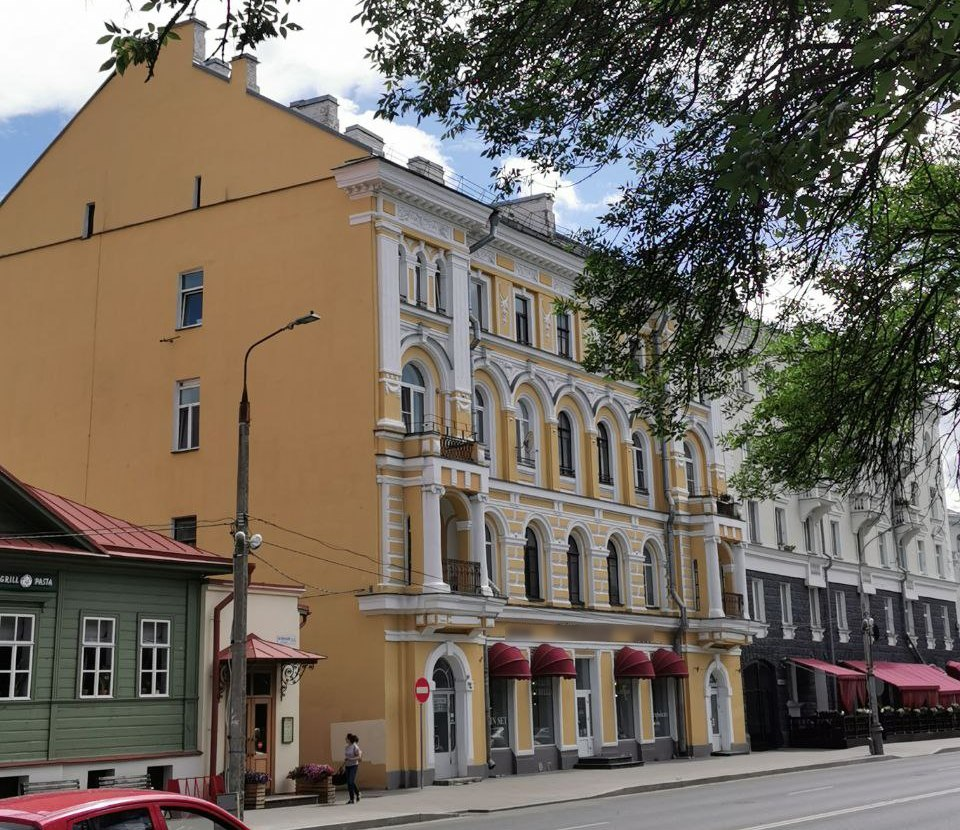
The street façade, photographed in 2022

The symmetrical, seven-bay façade has projecting sections at either end, without a separately emphasised central axis. Horizontal mouldings divide it into four levels, each with different decorative treatment.

At ground level, arched doorways in the projecting end sections lead to the main staircases. Their surrounds have prominent keystones. The central shop entrance and display windows are rectangular, with panelled wall strips between the openings.

The first-floor balconies resemble loggias: stylised porticoes frame arched doorways, while the windows between them are also arched. Heavy rustication articulates this level. Above the loggia-like balconies are further balconies with openwork metal railings. Their arched openings have moulded surrounds, keystones and cartouches. Stylised giant order pilasters extend across the two upper floors of the projecting end sections.

At the top level, each end section contains three narrow arched windows separated by panelled wall strips. The windows in the central section are rectangular, with moulded surrounds; projecting panels between them carry garlands.

A deeply projecting cornice crowns the façade. Its frieze has panels with moulded rosettes and garlands, and numerous decorative brackets support the cornice. A parapet of posts and metal railings originally stood above it but has been lost.

=== Courtyard façades ===
The courtyard façades are more restrained. They include two semicircular bay windows at the internal corners and a polygonal bay on the rear of the main block. The main block and four-storey wing share a similar treatment: smooth plastered walls, a moulded string course below the first-floor windows, and simple surrounds to the windows on the two lower floors. The upper windows have chamfered reveals without applied surrounds.

Moulded cornices finish the walls. An additional horizontal moulding below the cornice of the main block suggests a frieze. The courtyard elevation of the three-storey wing follows the same design. Most walls facing neighbouring plots are blank and undecorated. An exception is a small recessed, faceted portion of the north-western wall, containing rectangular and arched windows, some with surrounds, fragments of a string course below the first-floor windows, and a crowning cornice.

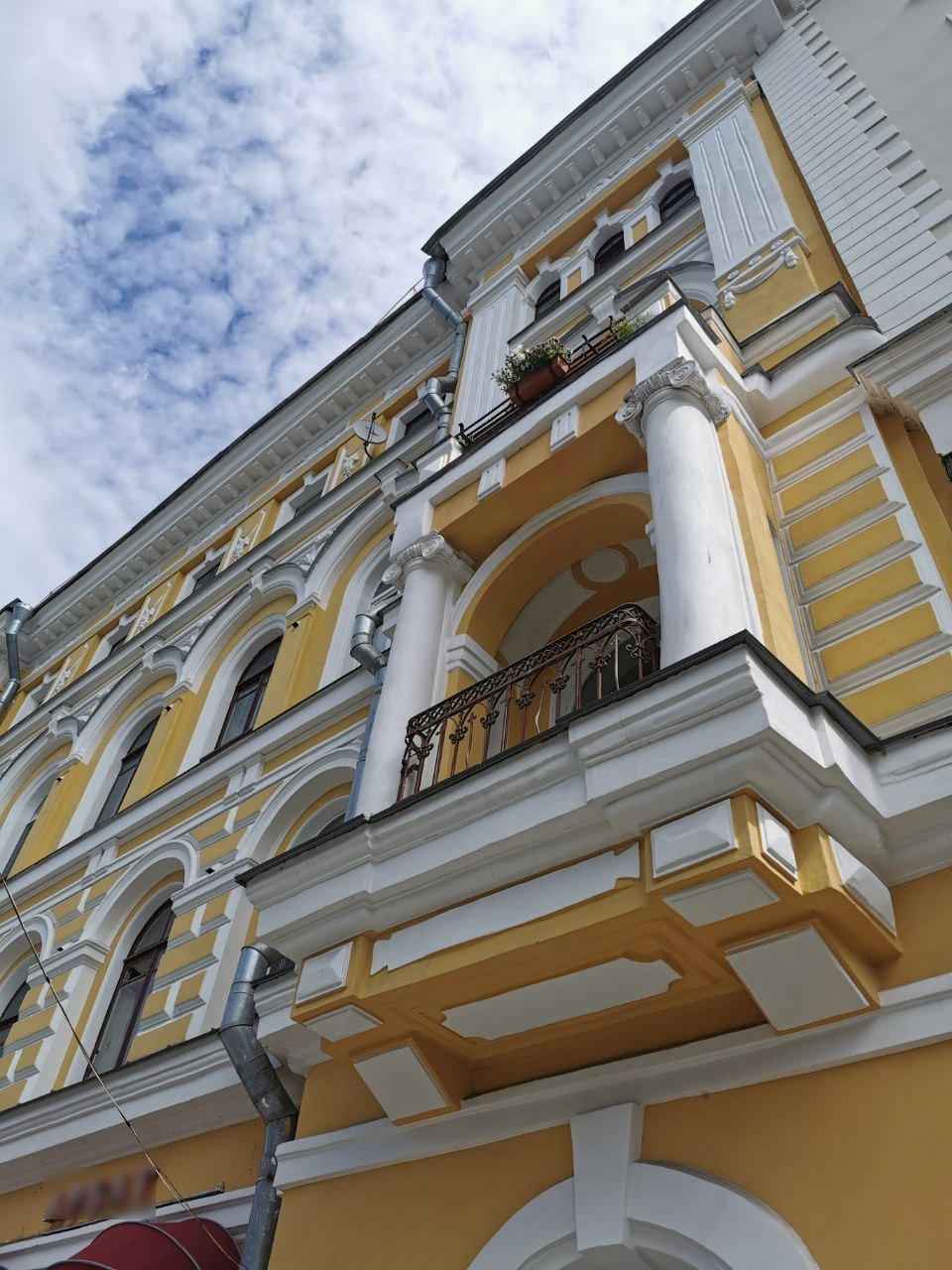
The loggia-like balcony at the second level of the street façade

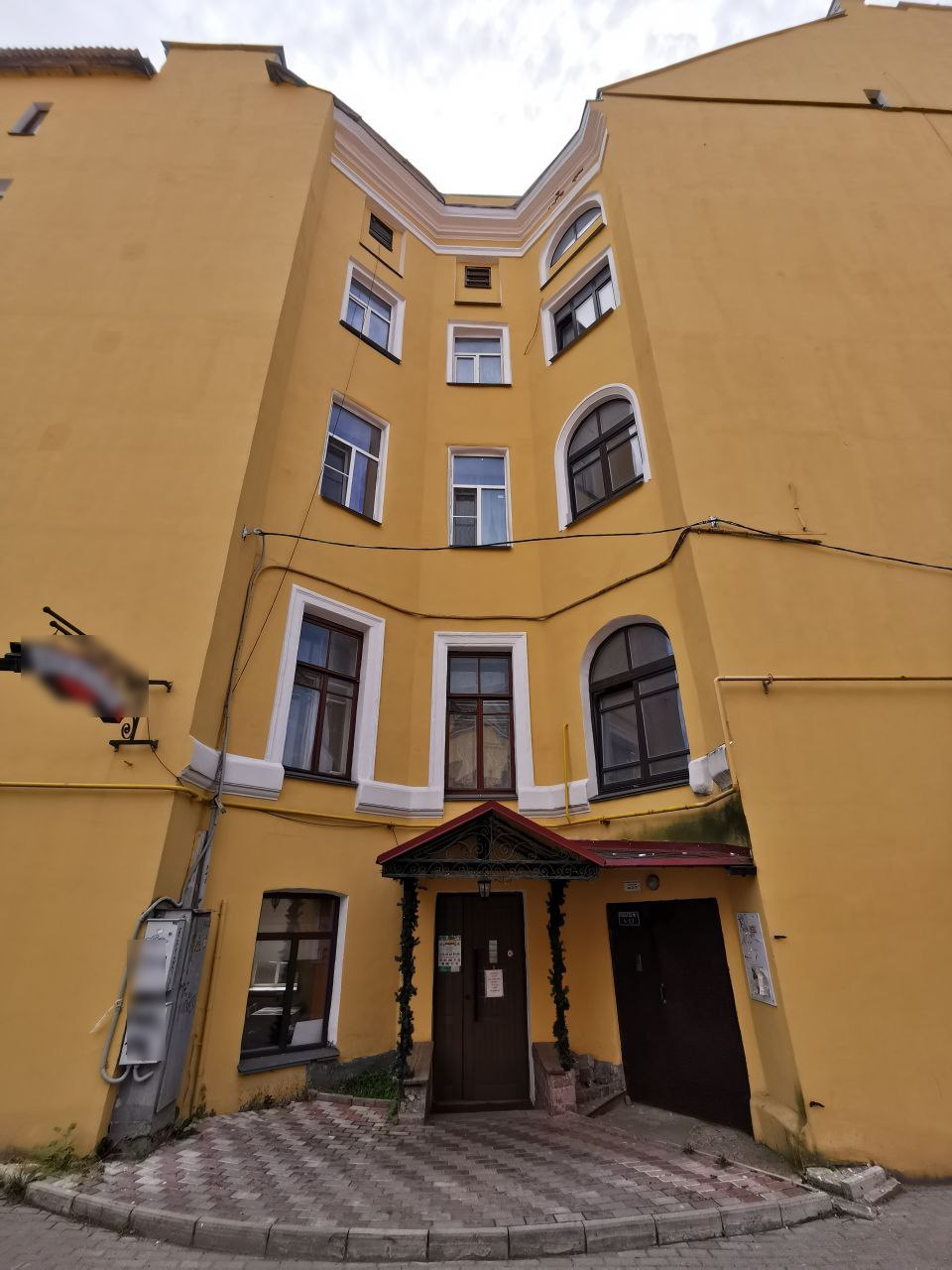
Entrance from the courtyard

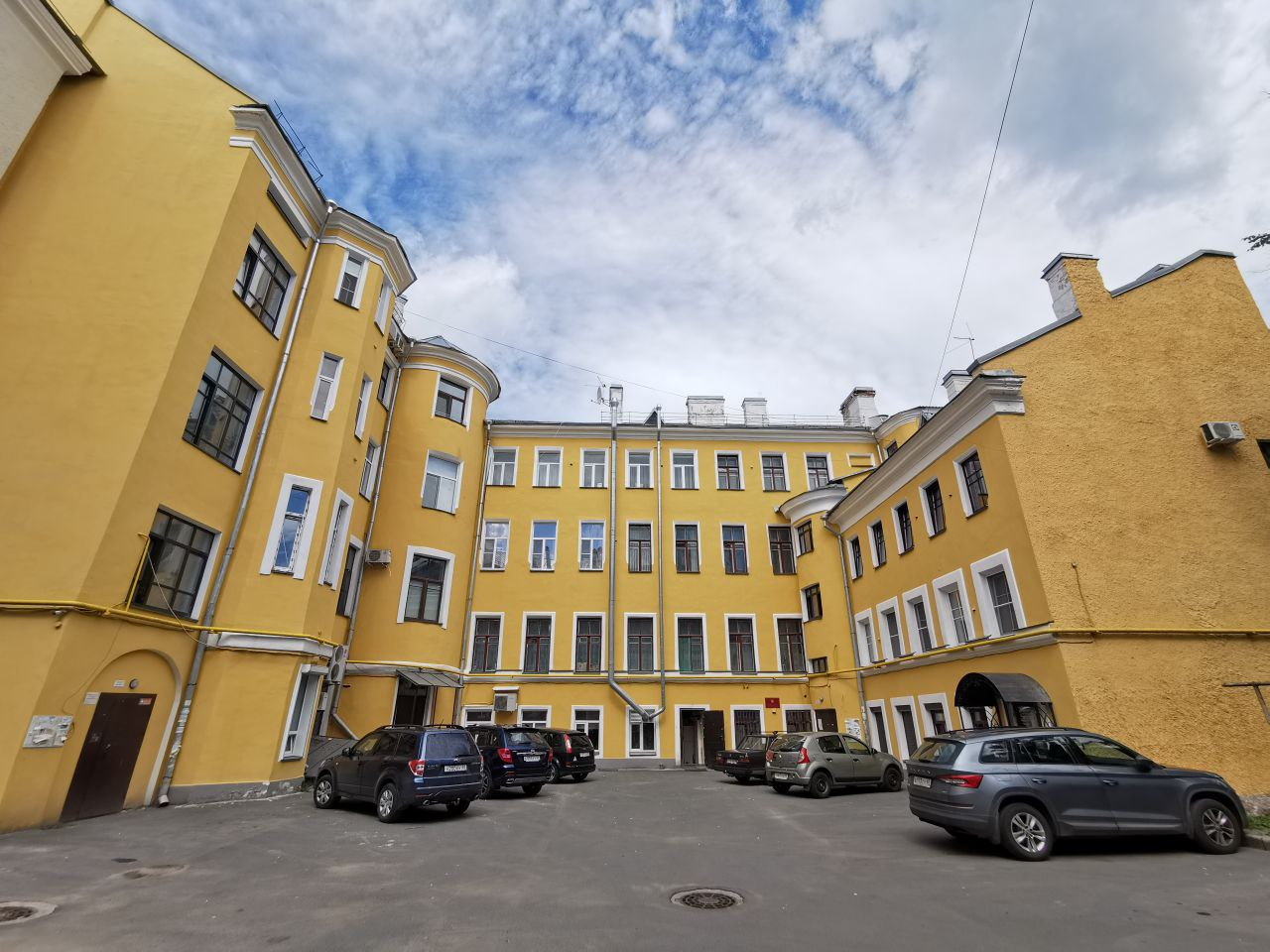
Rear façade and courtyard wings

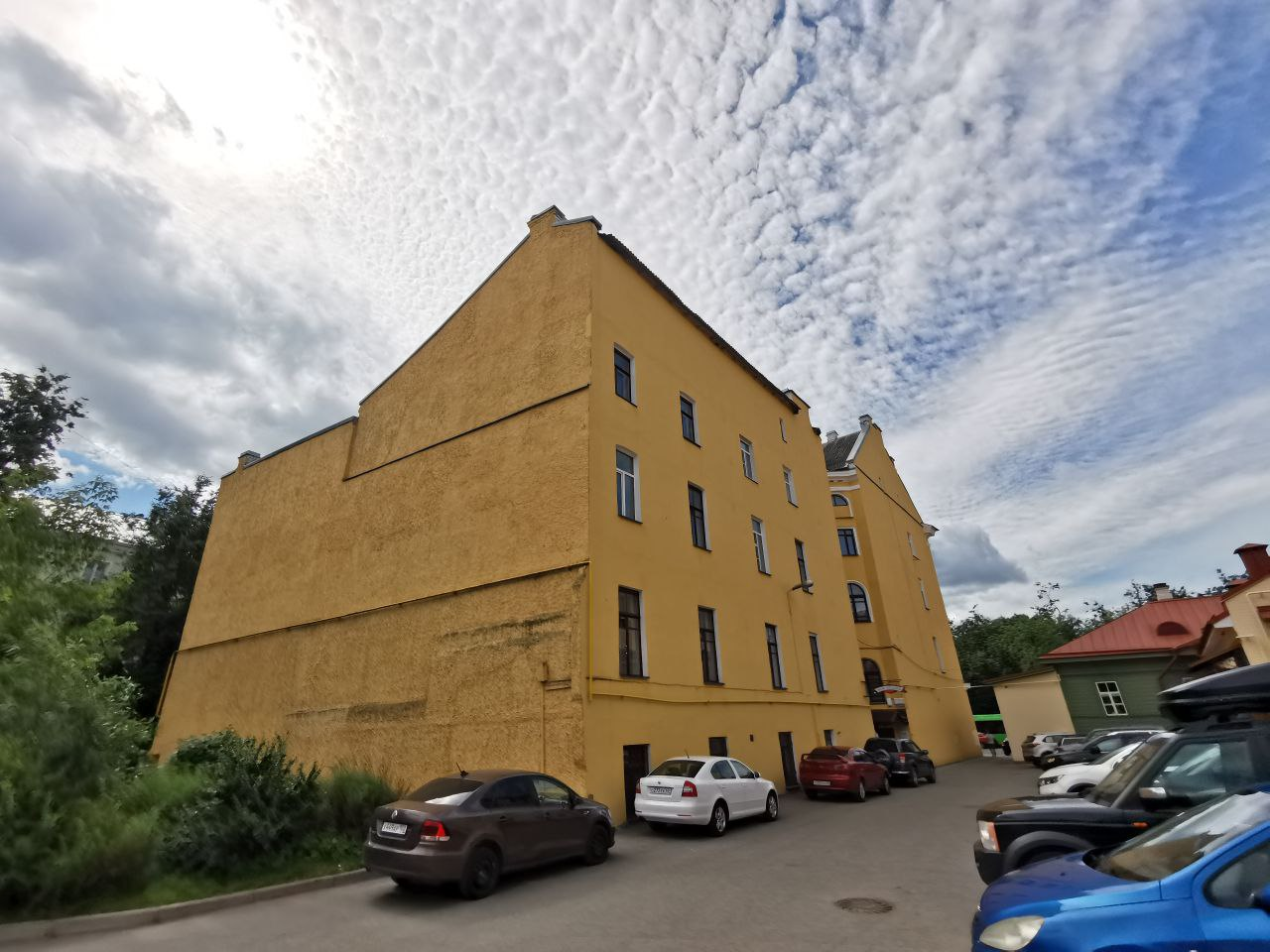
The four-storey wing

=== Layout and construction ===
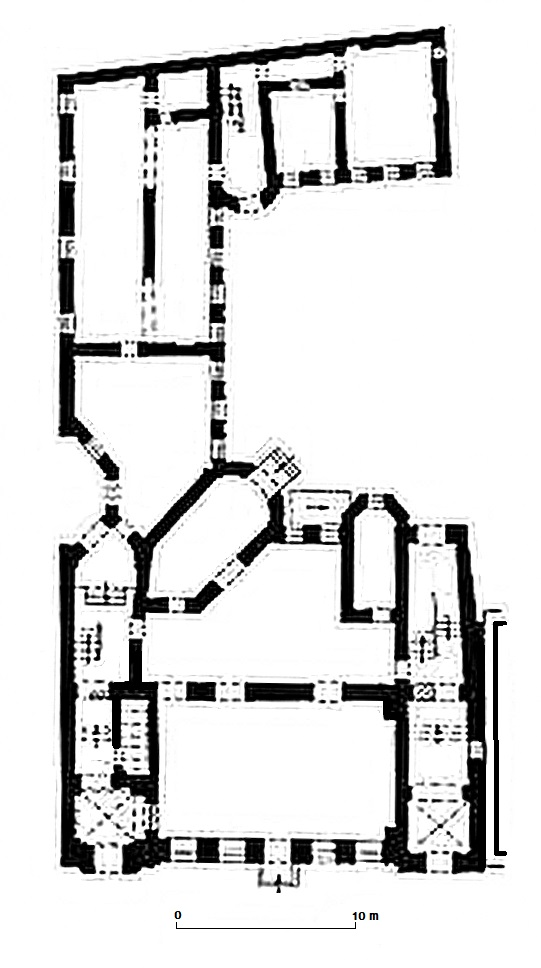
Floor plan of the house and its wings

The original layout survives chiefly in the principal structural walls. The architectural description suggests that some substantial internal walls were removed and replaced with beams and lighter partitions. These changes have been associated with the subdivision of accommodation in the Soviet period.

The ground-floor shop occupies the centre of the main block, with entrance vestibules and staircases at either side. The upper three floors originally provided larger apartments for wealthier tenants. The courtyard wings contained more modest accommodation, while retaining a consistent architectural treatment.

The recorded room heights are 4.00 metres on the ground floor, 4.13 metres on the first, 3.80 metres on the second and 3.33 metres on the third. In the wings they are 2.84 metres. The building has rubble-stone strip foundations and brick external and principal internal walls about 0.75 metres thick. Partitions and floor structures are timber. The timber roof structures were originally covered with sheet iron; the architectural account records a later covering of corrugated roofing sheets.

The main block measures 23.4 × 18.0 metres in plan; the four-storey wing measures 25.54 × 9.0 metres, and the three-storey wing 12.8 × 8.35 metres. The surviving arrangement is similar on each storey, apart from the basement, which extends beneath the central part of the main block but not beneath the projecting end sections.

A longitudinal load-bearing wall divides the main block, and a principal transverse wall crosses its central part. The staircases lie towards the courtyard. In the four-storey wing, a transverse structural wall survives through the full height, together with sections of a longitudinal load-bearing wall. Two transverse walls divide the three-storey wing into three parts; its staircase adjoins the four-storey wing.

== Later history ==
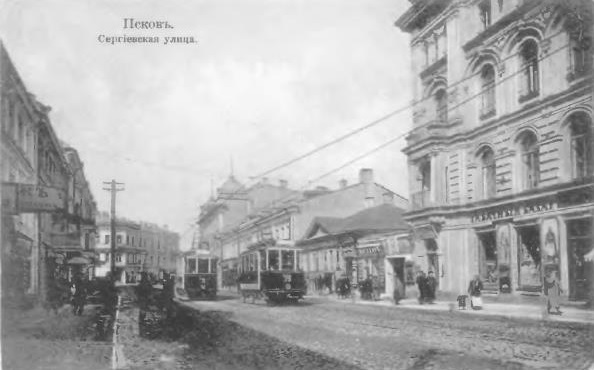
Sergievskaya Street, with part of Hesse House on the right

Hesse’s investments in the tannery and the house left him heavily indebted. The Pskov district court declared him insolvent on 30 November 1904, and he had to sell both properties to repay his creditors. The following year, Leonid Lanceray, chairman of the Russian insurance society, bought the building. It subsequently became the property of the society. Hesse continued to live and work there until his death in 1916, and his son Alexander lived there until leaving for Estonia in 1919.

After the 1917 revolution, the building was nationalised. After the Red Army entered Pskov on 25 November 1918, Jānis Fabriciuss, the extraordinary commissar of the Pskov front sector, established his headquarters there. It remained in the building until the retreat from Pskov in May 1919. It continued to be used for housing, and during the 1930s its interiors were subdivided to create additional living accommodation and communal apartments.

The building was badly damaged during the Second World War, although the basement, foundations and parts of the walls survived. It was restored for residential use in the post-war years. (Note: Pskoviana dates the restoration to 1946; the Pleskov architectural account gives 1948.) The restored building was placed under the city housing administration. Its ground-floor shops included the Oktyabrsky grocery shop, followed by the Propagandist book and political-literature shop, stationery and cultural-goods shops, and a food shop. The library account also records a later clothing shop; it does not establish the present tenant.

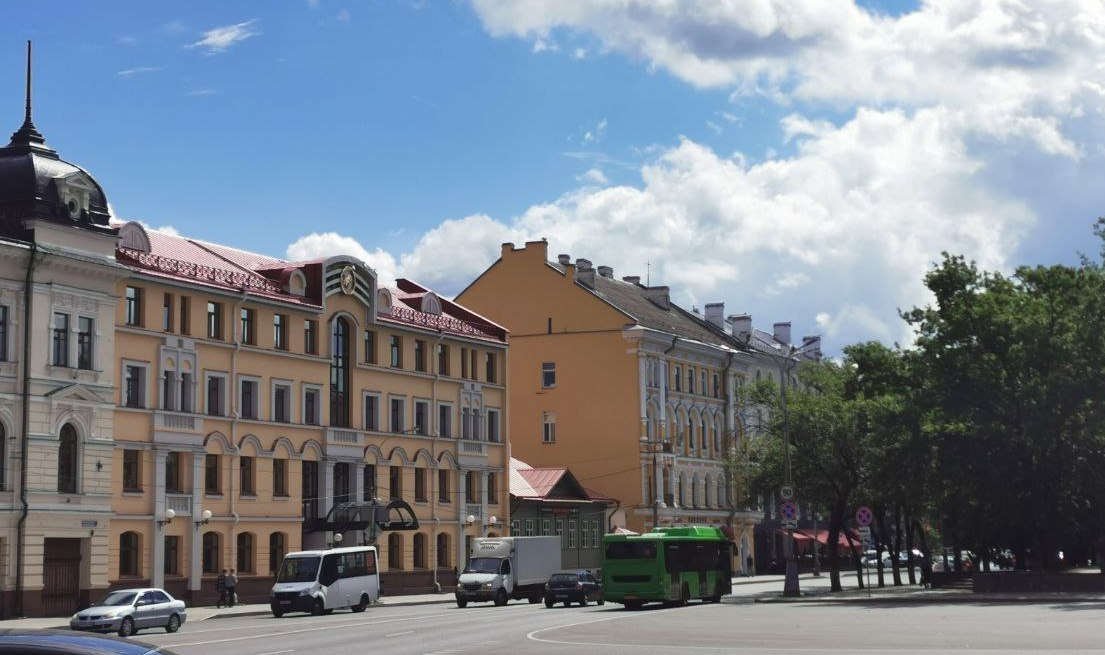
Hesse House in the streetscape of Oktyabrsky Prospekt, 2022

The restored building remains part of the historic streetscape. Awnings over the ground-floor shop windows reproduce the appearance shown in early photographs.

== Heritage status ==
Hesse House was designated a cultural heritage site of regional significance on 30 January 1998. Its protected status was reaffirmed by Resolution No. 187 of the Pskov Oblast Assembly of Deputies, dated 14 June 2012. It is recognised as a monument of residential architecture and of the history of commerce in Pskov.

A regional heritage-protection order, No. 798 of 23 November 2020, approved the boundary of the site associated with Hesse House. The order also set rules for use of the site.
