= Alexander Hesse =

Russian teacher, White Army officer, and cultural activist (1889–1941)

Alexander Avgustovich Hesse
- Alexander Hesse, around 1925
- Born: 18 March 1889; Pskov, Russian Empire
- Died: 25 March 1941 (aged 52); Leningrad, Soviet Union
- Citizenship: Russian Empire → Estonia → Soviet Union
- Occupation: Teacher
- Spouse: Maria Vasilyevna Hesse (née Denisova)
- Children: Boris, Irina
- Parent(s): August Fyodorovich Hesse (father); Maria Georgievna Hesse (née Strumpf) (mother)
- Awards: Order of St. Stanislaus, 3rd class

Alexander Avgustovich Hesse (Russian: Александр Августович Гессе; 18 March 1889, Pskov – 25 March 1941, Leningrad) was a Russian teacher, White Army officer, and activist in Russian Christian and cultural affairs in the Pechory (Petseri) region of interwar Estonia. He was executed by the Soviet authorities in 1941 and posthumously rehabilitated in 1989. He is recorded in church memorial lists of victims of Soviet repression.

== Family background ==
Alexander Hesse was born in Pskov to the insurance agent and entrepreneur August Fyodorovich Hesse. Both his father and mother were originally Narvan burghers, Baltic Germans who professed the Lutheran faith. In the 1890s, August Hesse became the owner of a tannery and joined the merchant estate, and in 1905 he was granted the title of hereditary honorary citizen, an estate status in the Russian Empire. His son accordingly described himself in official documents as being "of the Evangelical Lutheran confession, from hereditary honorary citizens."

Alexander also had a brother Boris (who died young of tuberculosis) and two half-sisters, Elsa and Maria, from his father's first marriage.

== Biography ==
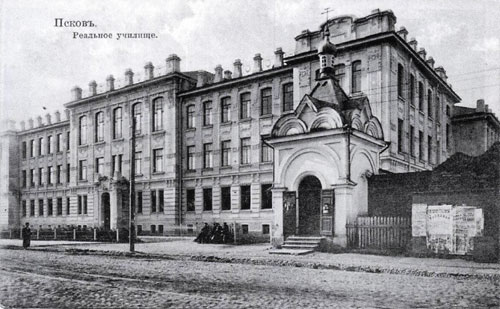
The Pskov Sergievsky Realschule in 1910

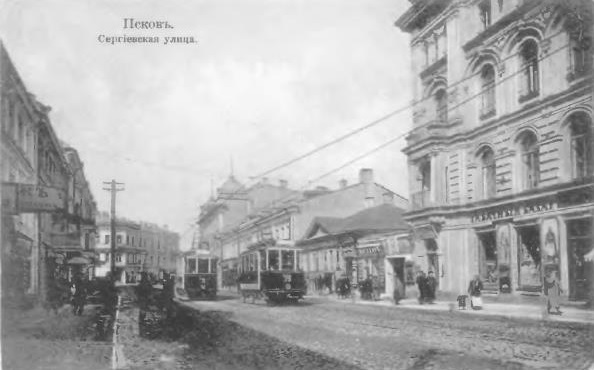
Sergievskaya Street with the corner of the Hesse House. Early 20th century.

Alexander's early childhood was spent in the Aristova house on Sadovaya Street (now Pushkin Street), where his parents rented an apartment. In the mid-1890s, August Hesse built a four-storey apartment building on Sergievskaya Street (now Oktyabrsky Prospekt, 12), which has since been known as the "Hesse House". The Hesse family moved into one of the apartments. Alexander lived in this apartment even after the revolution, until his departure for Estonia in 1919, subsequently settling in Pechory after recovering from illness.

From 1905 to 1908, Alexander Hesse studied at the Pskov Sergievsky Realschule. He then enrolled at Imperial Moscow University, in the Faculty of Physics and Mathematics. Pskov journalist and writer Oleg Kalkin writes that Hesse graduated with honours, but according to the memoirs of his son Boris, he was expelled for participation in student unrest and had to complete his degree as an external student at Imperial Saint Petersburg University (1913). There he also completed a one-year pedagogical course, and in 1914 took a teaching position at one of the capital's educational institutions.

=== World War I ===
Alexander Hesse entered military service during World War I in 1914. In later interrogations by the NKVD, he claimed to have been conscripted — a version that found its way into most biographies, whereas the family memoir describes his entry into service as voluntary. He entered service as an enlisted man. He was subsequently promoted to acting praporshchik (28 October 1914). He served in the 325th Pskov Infantry Druzhina of the State Militia, where from 15 November 1915 he held the position of clerk of the druzhina court. In 1916 he was promoted to podporuchik (sub-lieutenant). "For exemplary zealous service and labours undertaken during military operations", he was awarded the Order of St. Stanislaus, 3rd class (order of the Commander-in-Chief of the Armies of the Northern Front No. 87, 7 February 1917; Russian Estonia gives a seniority date of 5 October 1916).

After demobilisation in 1917, he returned to Pskov, where he took a position as a mathematics teacher at the Mariinsky Women's Gymnasium.

=== Russian Civil War ===
In February 1918, German forces advancing on Petrograd occupied Pskov. The occupation lasted nine months. During this period, Hesse, for whom German was his native language, worked as an interpreter in the city administration. This took place during the Russian Civil War. In the autumn of 1918, the formation of the Pskov Separate Volunteer Corps of the Northern (later Northwestern) White Army began in the occupied city. The population enlisted reluctantly, and by November the corps numbered about 4,500 men, a third of whom were former Imperial officers. Hesse did not join the White forces at this stage.

On 25 November 1918, units of the 7th Army of the RKKA occupied Pskov. The Germans left the city without a fight. The White forces attempted to resist but were defeated and retreated into Estonian territory. Soviet power was established in the city. Extraordinary Commissar of the Pskov sector of the front Jānis Fabriciuss set up his headquarters in the "Hesse House". All former Imperial officers remaining in Pskov were required to register with the military and report monthly to the military commissariat, where they had to fill in questionnaires about their attitudes towards the new government, Marxism, Bolshevik policies, and so on. Their freedom of movement was strictly limited. The constant inspections, re-inspections, and restrictions caused resentment among the former career military men.

On 13 May 1919, a joint offensive by Estonian forces and the White Northern Corps of General Rodzyanko towards Petrograd began. Pskov was taken by the Estonians in late May, after which a detachment of Colonel Stanisław Bułak-Bałachowicz entered the city and immediately began a campaign of White Terror. The situation in the city remained unstable. Fearing the return of the Bolsheviks and forced conscription into the Red Army, many of the retired officers who had previously hesitated began to join the Whites. Among them was A. A. Hesse.

On 7 June 1919, Hesse was enlisted in the newly formed Northwestern Army (order of the Commander-in-Chief No. 171, 31 July 1919, Narva). With his background in mathematics, he was assigned to the army's Inspector of Artillery. First, Hesse served as head of communications of the 1st Separate Light Artillery Battalion, then as commander of a reconnaissance company of the artillery battalion of the 4th Gdov Infantry Regiment. He was promoted to poruchik (lieutenant).

On 26 August, Pskov was retaken by the Red Army. Yudenich's army retreated into Estonia once more to prepare for a new offensive, which began in the autumn. The division of General A. F. Dzerozhinsky, in which Hesse served, initially operated on the auxiliary Pskov–Luga axis, was then placed in reserve, and in late October, after the unsuccessful assault on Petrograd, helped contain the Red Army counteroffensive in the Gatchina area, cutting the Luga–Gdov railway line.

In Gdov, Hesse, who had weak lungs, fell seriously ill. In this condition he was evacuated by the retreating Whites through Narva into Estonia. In December, Dzerozhinsky's division was disarmed by the Estonians on the Narva–Yuryev road and left outdoors without shelter in freezing conditions. Epidemic typhus raged among the soldiers. Hesse survived despite his illness and the harsh conditions. On 22 January 1920, the Northwestern Army was officially dissolved. Having recovered from his illness, Hesse, with the help of his former schoolmate and fellow "Northwesterner" G. V. Svidzinsky, obtained a position as a mathematics teacher at the Russian gymnasium in Pechory, which was then on Estonian territory.

=== In Pechory ===
The Pechory County of Estonia during the interwar period was a centre of Russian cultural life. The Civil War brought members of the first wave of Russian emigration to the region, which also attracted visitors interested in its Russian cultural institutions. Until the mid-1930s, relatively liberal minority rights legislation was in effect in Estonia. The Russian language in the Pechory region was official alongside Estonian. During the 1920s, Russian residents established public organisations, which in 1923 united into the Union of Russian Educational and Charitable Societies in Estonia.

People working in the arts, sciences and religious life in Pechory included the poet B. K. Semyonov, chemist N. V. Potin, artist and actor S. S. Beregavskikh, engineer A. P. Rozhansky, musicians and choral conductors M. F. Grivsky, N. A. Vekhnovsky, B. P. Zhemchuzhyn, Bishop Ioann (Bulin), and others. The locally born, self-taught sculptor A. M. Denisov, formerly a curator of sculptures at the Tsarskoye Selo palace ensemble, returned from Petrograd. P. V. Nesterov, a scholar and traveller who had been a privat-docent at Saint Petersburg University, taught at the local gymnasium. Over the years, the town was visited by philosophers Nikolai Berdyaev, Vasily Zenkovsky, Sergei Bulgakov, Lev Zander, Ivan Ilyin, writer Ivan Shmelev, and Feodor Chaliapin gave concerts. Kalkin characterises the public and cultural life of the Pechory "oasis" as distinguished by ideological and political tolerance, the absence of social and class antagonisms, and a genuine democratic spirit almost impossible under pre-revolutionary Russian conditions.

Hesse taught in Pechory for about 20 years. Former pupils recalled his teaching favourably. Pechory local historian Nikolai Pavlovich Zlatinsky recalled him many years later:

A very kind, truly Russian intelligent man. There are no such teachers today...

A former pupil of Hesse, P. A. Dyatlov, who himself became a teacher, said of him in the 1980s:

I hardly possessed any mathematical abilities, but Alexander Avgustovich's lessons were always a celebration for me. He explained things briefly, but so clearly and so accessibly that one could immediately foresee the course of a solution or a proof. We had many good teachers, but Hesse was especially liked by many. And as a person he was simple, modest, kind-hearted, always ready to help others. I am happy and proud that I had the chance to study under such a teacher.

Hesse participated in Pechory's cultural and public life. He was a member of the local cultural-educational society, assisted in the work of its libraries, took part in organising public concerts and theatrical performances, played the piano performing works of Frédéric Chopin, Alexander Scriabin, and Franz Liszt, and gave lectures. He also participated in the activities of the Russian Christian Movement. It is unknown when Alexander Hesse converted from Lutheranism to Orthodoxy, but after settling in Pechory he regularly attended services at the Pskov-Caves Monastery.

While living in Estonia, A. A. Hesse took an interest in the fate of the Russian peasantry and had contacts with representatives of the Peasant Russia party, founded in 1921 in Prague by the Socialist Revolutionary S. S. Maslov. He also met with Maslov himself, who visited Pechory in 1927. Hesse was also acquainted with the economist P. A. Bogdanov, who during the Civil War had served as Minister of Agriculture in the Northwestern Government, and in the late 1920s worked as a surveyor in Pechory. With them, Alexander Avgustovich discussed the prospects of peasant policy and co-operation. Bogdanov briefly noted these conversations in his diary:

Alexander Avgustovich Hesse says that nothing is coming of the attempts to organise the peasantry. True, he qualifies it: "Perhaps we don't know how to approach them."

In 1932, Alexander Hesse took an active part in the election campaign to nominate representatives of the Russian population of the Pechory region to the Estonian State Assembly.

In a recollection published by Postimees in 2011, former pupil Leonid Gordejev described Hesse as a teacher of mathematics and physics in both the Russian and Estonian sections of the school. He also identified Hesse in a school photograph taken in 1936.

=== Marriage ===
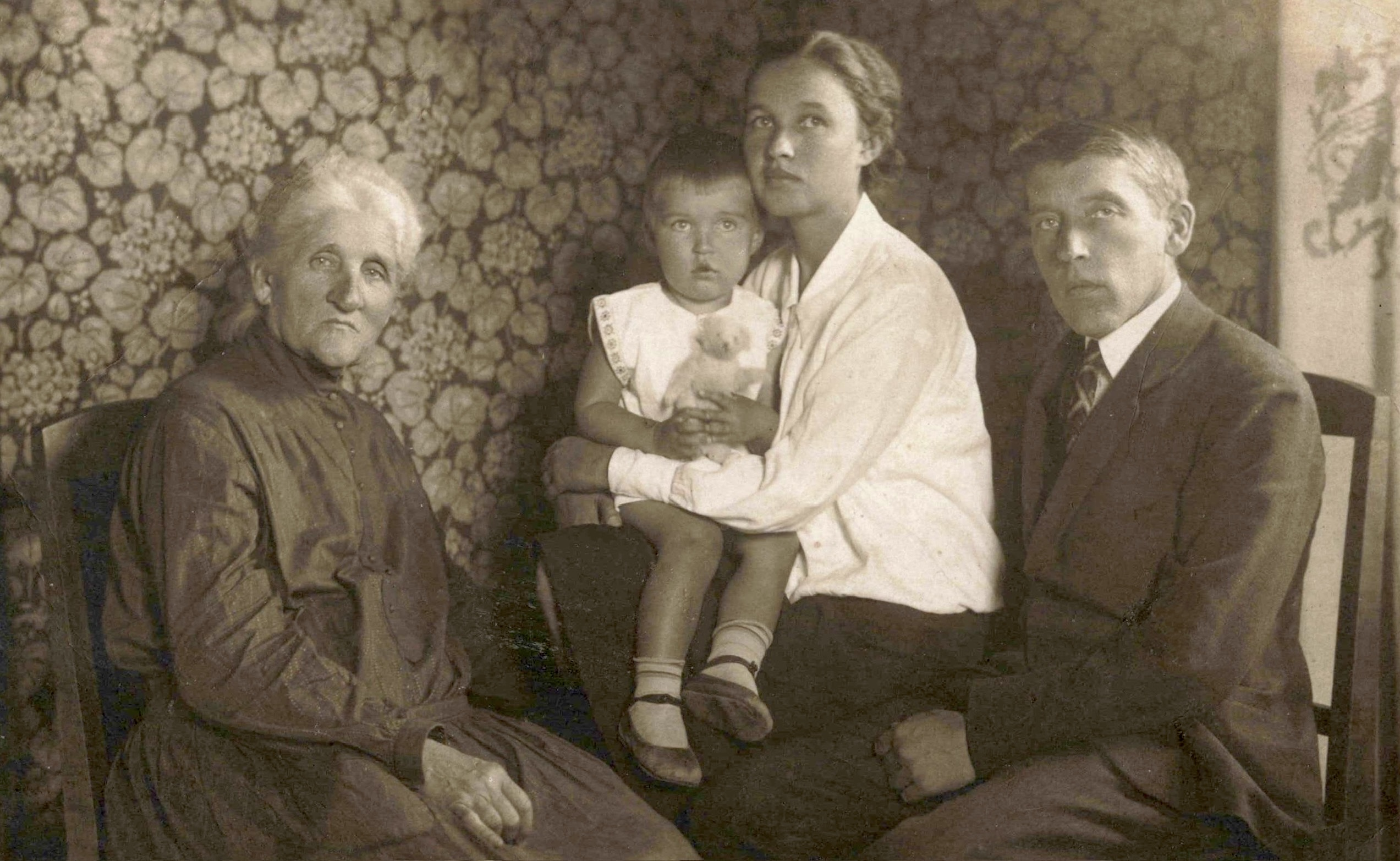
(left to right) unidentified person, daughter Irina, Maria (identified as Fyodorovna in the earlier caption; her identity needs checking), Alexander Avgustovich Hesse. 1929.

A. A. Hesse married Maria Vasilyevna Denisova (1900–1989), a member of the Pechory Old Believers family of the Pomorian confession. The founders of the Denisov lineage are considered to be the brothers Aleksey and Semyon Denisov, according to tradition descendants of Prince Myshetsky. The family also included the Pechory sculptor A. M. Denisov, whose works decorated the Russian gymnasium building where Hesse taught. Alexander and Maria Hesse had a daughter, Irina (born 1927), and a son, Boris (born 1930).

In 1936, Hesse built his own five-room house in Pechory on Koidu Street (now Sovetskaya Street), taking a bank loan for the purpose. The family lived comfortably, receiving guests on Sundays.

From the early 1930s, and especially after the rise to power of the government of Konstantin Päts, authoritarian and nationalist tendencies intensified in Estonia. An active Estonianization of the Pechory region began. In 1937, the Russian division of the gymnasium was closed and the Russian language was being squeezed out of use. By this time, Hesse's health had begun to deteriorate. His lung disease worsened, and in 1939 he had to convalesce at a resort in southern Estonia. Hesse gradually withdrew from public work and left the cultural-educational society.

=== Arrest, trial, and execution ===
On 16 June 1940, the Soviet Union issued an ultimatum to Estonia demanding the immediate entry of Soviet troops and the removal of the government, threatening military invasion otherwise. Estonia accepted the ultimatum. The next day, units of the Red Army entered Tallinn. The new government was entirely subordinate to instructions from the Kremlin. Arrests and deportations of citizens of the Estonian Republic began, targeting first of all the White émigrés. On 21 July, Soviet power was proclaimed in the country, and on 22 July the Estonian Soviet Socialist Republic adopted a declaration on joining the Soviet Union.

Alexander Hesse was arrested in the summer of 1940. (Note: Kalkin gives 20 July; the Pskov memorial book and Cherkazyanova give 24 July. The Estonian register edited by Õispuu gives June 1940.)

They came during the day, "two men in civilian clothes", and presented a search warrant. "Where are you hiding weapons?" — "We don't have any." They looked in papa's desk, found nothing, of course. "Come with us." That was it. We, like the others, thought it really would be for a short time, after all there was no guilt. But it turned out to be forever.

— Boris Hesse, The Bond of Times Shall Not Be Broken, p. 192

The charges stated: "Being an enemy of the USSR, he did not recognise the communist system, sought to overthrow it and conducted hostile activities directed against the USSR... He expressed himself negatively about the economic policies of the USSR, and disapprovingly assessed the standard of living of Soviet people." The charges concerned his public activity in Estonia between 1919 and 1940. The most serious charges were based on his participation in the affairs of the Pechory Cultural-Educational Society, which was declared counter-revolutionary and anti-Soviet:

"The counter-revolutionary idea of this organisation was the support of national consciousness in the Russian population of the Pechory region... and this was harmful to the development of class struggle. The counter-revolutionary idea was promoted that only old things are good, and that no artistic values can be expected from the USSR."

The last charge was based on the fact that Hesse, working in the Society's library, had selected primarily works of Russian classical authors for reading.

According to Oleg Kalkin, Hesse gave no testimony against his acquaintances during interrogation. The investigators also tried to establish that he had participated in S. S. Maslov’s party. Hesse acknowledged meeting Maslov but denied being a member of his party. Hesse was transferred first to Tallinn, then to Leningrad, where he was tried on 31 October 1940.

At his trial, Hesse spoke about the efforts of Russian educators to preserve their culture in interwar Estonia. Under the combined Articles 58-4 and 58-11 of the RSFSR Criminal Code, A. A. Hesse was sentenced to death. The Supreme Court of the RSFSR and the Presidium of the Supreme Court, to which appeals were filed, upheld the sentence. On 25 March 1941, A. A. Hesse was executed by firing squad.

== Rehabilitation and legacy ==
In 1962, Hesse's widow Maria Vasilyevna petitioned the Pskov Procurator's Office for her husband's rehabilitation, but was refused. In February 1989, one of Alexander Avgustovich's former students, P. A. Dyatlov, submitted a renewed petition. The case review concluded that Hesse was completely innocent. The investigation established facts of biased conduct of the inquiry, as well as the use of impermissible methods by NKVD investigators. On 15 November 1989, A. A. Hesse was rehabilitated "for the absence of any criminal act in his actions." M. V. Hesse did not live to see this event, having died several months earlier.

Pechory local historians have written about Hesse's life. His name has been included in the "Pskov Synodikon of those who suffered for the faith of Christ during the years of persecution among the clergy, monastics and laypeople of the Pskov Eparchy of the 20th century" and in the database "Those Who Suffered for Christ" of Saint Tikhon's Orthodox University.

== Children ==
After A. A. Hesse's arrest, his wife and children endured severe hardships. On 14 June 1941, the family was deported to Tomsk Oblast, to Vasyugan. Irina Hesse recorded the family's life in exile and the hardships they experienced in a diary written on birch bark, which she kept for several years. Irina was released from special-settlement restrictions in 1954. The Pskov memorial book records Maria's rehabilitation on 15 July 1992 and also lists Irina and Boris as rehabilitated members of the family.

Maria Vasilyevna raised the two children in exile. Both later received higher education: Irina became a physicist and Boris an energy engineer.

- Irina Alexandrovna Hesse (b. 1927) became a physicist and taught at Novgorod State University. She trained physics and mathematics teachers. She conducted research in solid-state physics and semiconductor physics, and lectured on various branches of general and theoretical physics. She headed the Department of Physics at NovSU for an extended period. Under her leadership, many laboratory exercises were modernised and new teaching manuals were prepared whose use was reported in the university's 2013 publication.
- Boris Alexandrovich Hesse (born 1930) became an energy engineer. He participated in the construction of many power plants in the USSR, including the Bratsk Hydroelectric Power Station, and worked in Vietnam. He later lived in Zaporizhzhia.
