= August Hesse =

Baltic German insurance agent, merchant, and philanthropist in the Russian Empire

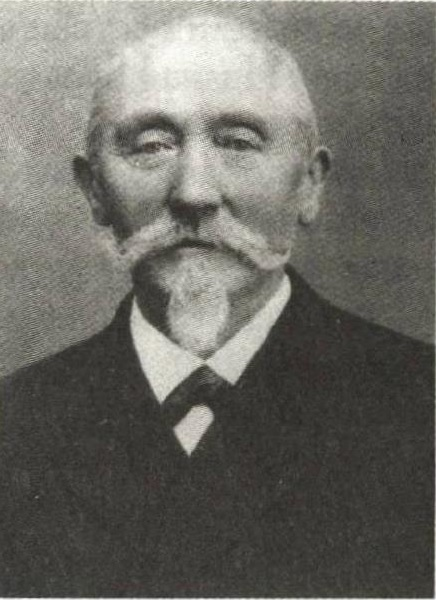
- Born: German: August Heinrich Hesse; 28 November 1837; Narva, Russian Empire
- Died: 23 October 1916 (aged 78); Pskov, Russian Empire
- Citizenship: Russian Empire
- Occupations: Insurance agent, merchant, philanthropist, civic leader
- Spouses: Maria Hermina Amalia Auger (m. 1870); Maria Georgievna Strumpf
- Children: Elsa, Maria (first marriage); Alexander, Boris
- Parents: Friedrich Ludwig Hesse (father); Anna Catharina Hesse (mother)
- Awards: Gold Medal "For Zeal" on the Order of St. Stanislaus ribbon (1896); Hereditary Honorary Citizen (1905)

August Hesse (Russian: А́вгуст Фёдорович Ге́ссе, 28 November 1837, Narva – 23 October [O.S. 10 October] 1916, Pskov) was a Baltic German insurance agent, merchant, philanthropist, and civic leader in the Russian Empire. He served as chief inspector of the Russian fire insurance society in Pskov and as a deputy (Russian: гласный) of the Pskov City duma. In 1905 he was granted hereditary honorary citizenship, an estate status in the Russian Empire.

He commissioned the construction of a four-storey rental apartment building on Sergievskaya Street (now Oktyabrsky Prospekt, 12), designed by the architect Fyodor Nesturkh. Known as Hesse House, it is a cultural heritage site of regional significance.

== Biography ==
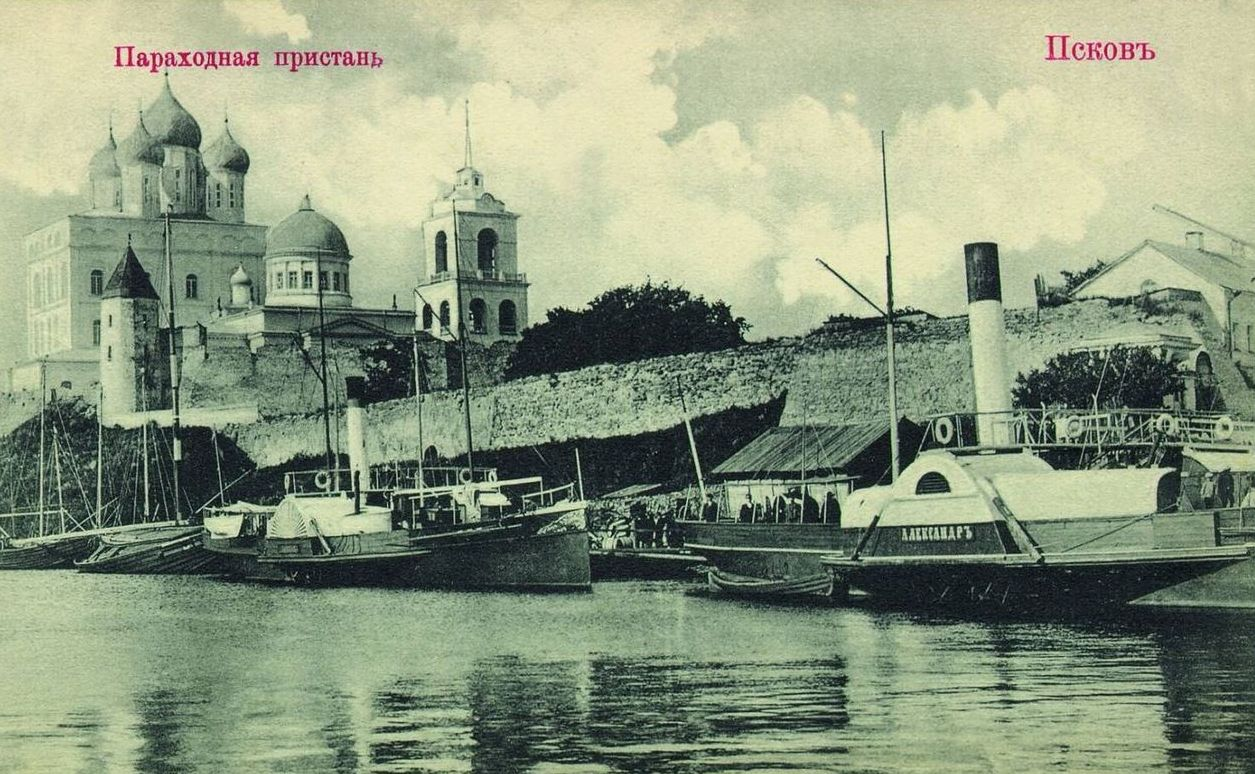
The steamships Dorpat and Alexander at the river landing in Pskov. Late 19th-century postcard

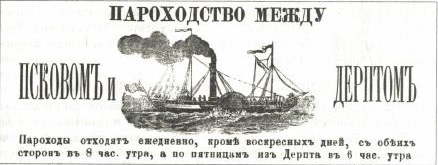
Advertisement for commercial steamship service between Pskov and Dorpat. Pskov City Leaflet, 1 May 1888

August Hesse, a Baltic German by origin, was born in the city of Narva. His parents belonged to the Narva burgher estate and professed the Lutheran faith. The exact year of Hesse's move to Pskov is uncertain. His relatives Franz and Luise Hesse owned property in the city. He subsequently lived and worked in Pskov, where his descendants also settled.

Since the time of Peter the Great, Pskov had been home to a sizeable German community (according to a one-day census on 19 December 1863, out of 16,800 inhabitants approximately 1,500 were Lutherans, the majority of whom held Russian citizenship). Members of this community played a prominent role in economic and public life. Hesse participated in the city's commercial and civic life.

=== Early years in Pskov ===
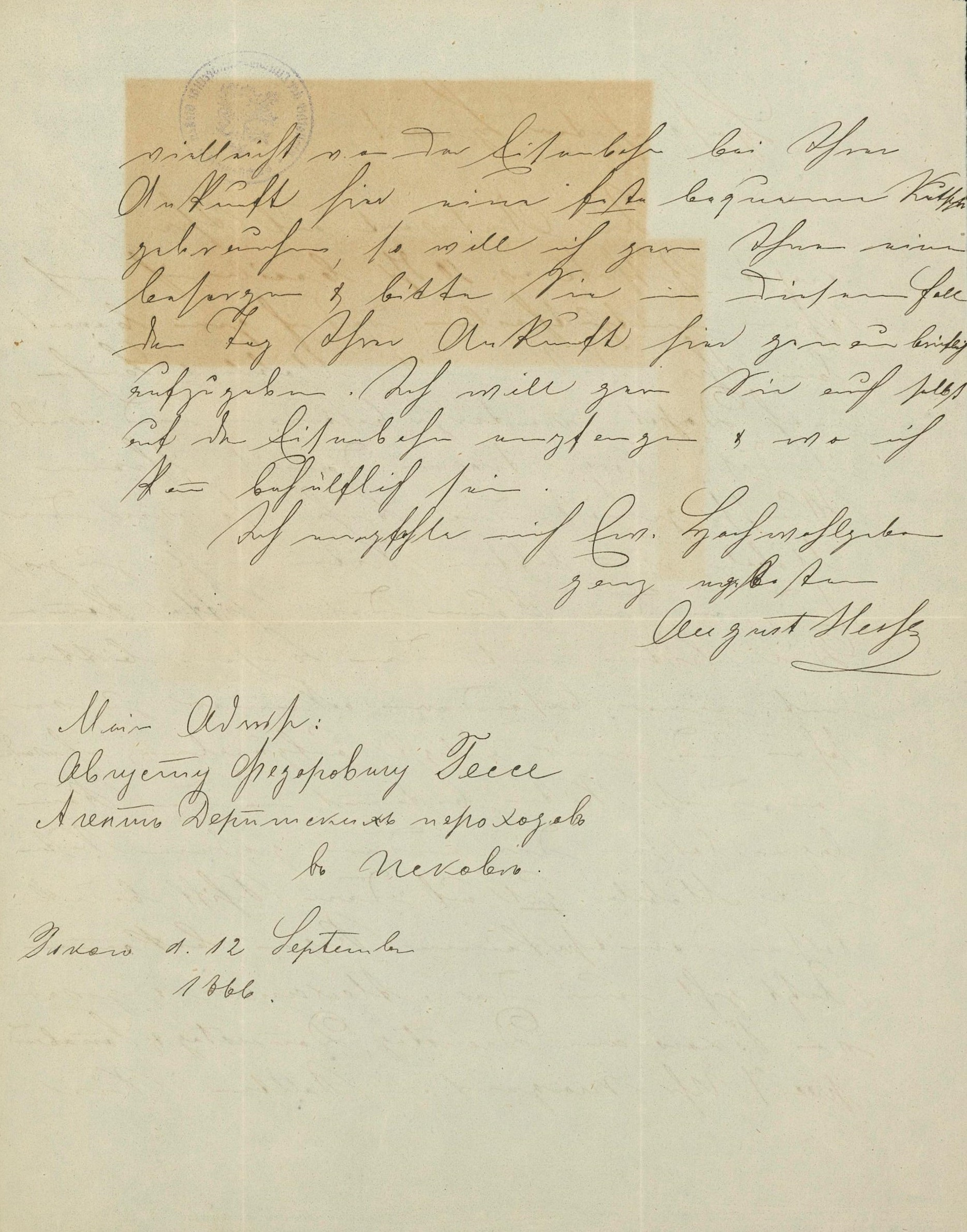
Letter from August Hesse to Karl Ernst von Baer, reverse side with the author's signature

Local historians believe that Hesse came to Pskov on behalf of the Narva trading house of Gent, which owned the steamships Narva and Alexander, running daily between Dorpat and Pskov. From 1865, Hesse was officially employed by Gent's Pskov office, managing the runs of these vessels. At the time he lived in the Aristova house on Sadovaya Street (now Pushkin Street).

His work frequently required him to negotiate with clients, some of whom were notable figures. A surviving letter from Hesse to Karl Ernst von Baer, dated 12 September 1866, concerns the shipping of furniture and books to Dorpat, where the naturalist was to relocate from Saint Petersburg the following year.

In addition to shipping, Hesse entered the insurance business. In 1866 he was appointed agent of the Russian Insurance Society for Capitals and Income "Life" (Russian: Российское общество страхования капиталов и доходов «Жизнь»), a post he held for seven years. Gradually, other insurance companies of the empire began to engage his services: the Russian fire insurance society (1868), the Moscow-based "Yakor" company (1873), then "Dvigatel", and later the Saint Petersburg "Nadezhda" company (1882). Hesse collaborated with the Russian fire insurance society for 40 years, rising to the post of general inspector for Pskov and its surroundings, while "Yakor" appointed him inspector for the whole of Russia in 1893. He also represented firms dealing in land, sea, and river transport insurance.

In 1870, Hesse married Maria Hermina Amalia Auger, a native of Vitebsk. The couple had two daughters, Elsa and Maria. He later married Maria Georgievna Strumpf. He had two sons: Alexander and Boris. Boris died young of tuberculosis. Alexander became a teacher and a participant in Russian cultural organisations in the Pechory region.

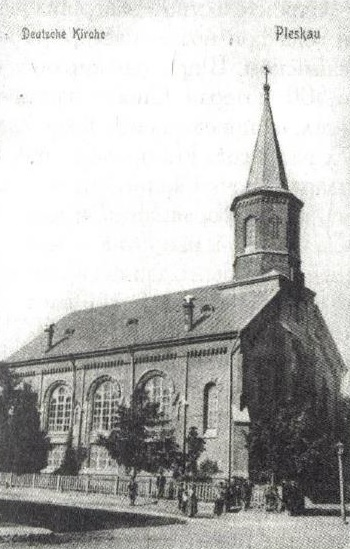
The Lutheran Church of St. James (Jakobskirche) in Pskov. 19th-century postcard

=== Charitable and civic activities ===
By the 1890s, Hesse was also lending money. He lent 25,000 rubles to the merchant S. I. Kirillov, secured against a leather factory on the bank of the Velikaya River in the village of Kolyagino, Logozovskaya volost, near the local St. John the Baptist Monastery. Kirillov defaulted on the loan, and Hesse became the owner of the enterprise, thus entering the merchant estate.

Hesse regularly contributed funds to support the women's parish school (from 1906 a private German progymnasium) and the almshouse at the Pskov Lutheran Church of St. James. The church had been built by, and served as the parish of, his namesake Pastor-Adjunct Robert Hesse (a relative of the writer Hermann Hesse).

Hesse was also one of the directors of the Governorate Guardianship Committee for Prisons and a trustee of the "Pskov Central" katorga prison on Kakhanovsky Boulevard (now Oktyabrsky Prospekt, 50). His duties included ongoing organisational and financial support for correctional institutions.

In 1874, Hesse was first elected as a deputy of the Pskov City duma. He was re-elected numerous times thereafter and served on the audit commission. During this period he was an active member of the Russian Lifesaving Society (Russian: Общество спасения на водах), where he served as treasurer. Largely through his efforts and personal funds, a public bathing facility on the Velikaya River was established. (Note: The library biography dates it to 1896; Pleskov gives 1906.)

For his work in improving conditions for prisoners, Hesse was awarded the gold Medal "For Zeal" (Russian: медаль «За усердие») on 27 June 1896.

=== Construction ===
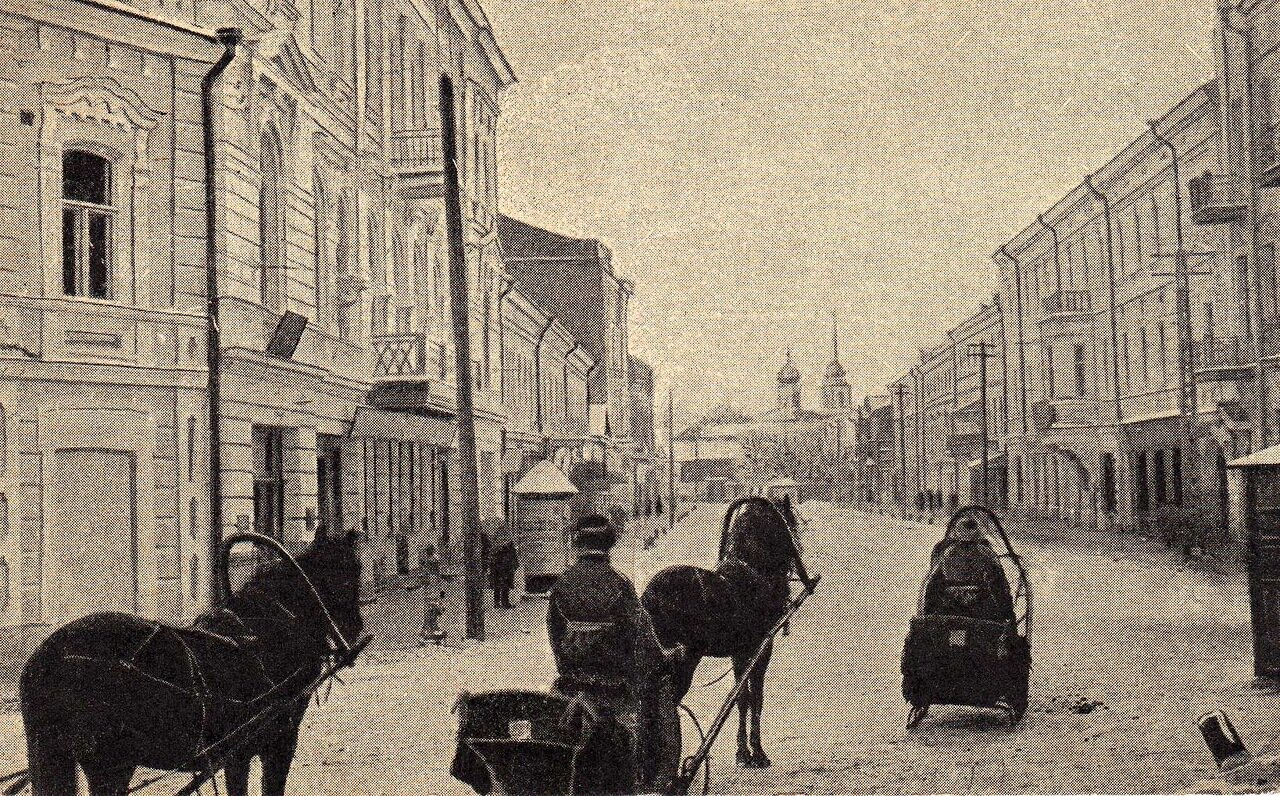
View of Sergievskaya Street in the mid-19th century. The Church of St. Anastasia the Roman is visible in the distance

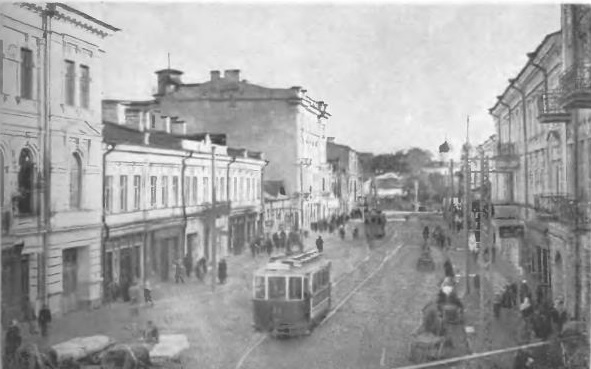
The same street in the early 20th century, after the opening of the tramway

In 1895, according to the library biography, Hesse inherited a plot of land on Sergievskaya Street from his Pskov relatives, on which stood an old single-storey manor house with two wings. (Note: The library biography gives 1895; Pleskov places the inheritance in the early 1890s.) Sergievskaya, one of Pskov's two central thoroughfares, was at that time undergoing rapid development. Following the opening of the Pskov–Riga Railway (1889), the construction of a railway station and a railway bridge across the Velikaya, traffic increased and Sergievskaya became one of the city's principal thoroughfares. The electric tram followed in January 1912.

Hesse invested in a residential and commercial building intended to generate rental income. In the mid-1890s he demolished the dilapidated structures on his plot and commissioned the city architect Fyodor Nesturkh to design a large four-storey building to serve simultaneously as a residence and a rental apartment building. The building was completed by 1897. Hesse had already moved his insurance office there in November 1896. The building was one of the tallest in the predominantly low-rise city and had an elaborately decorated façade. Hesse financed its construction. The upper floors contained large apartments, while the ground floor was intended for offices and shops. Hesse and his family occupied one of the apartments; the rest were let. The building also housed his insurance agency office, where one of the employees was his niece, Olga Petrovna Hesse. According to the Memorial Book of Pskov Governorate for 1905–1906, in the early years of the 20th century the same address also housed an Evangelical Lutheran women's school under Hesse's patronage.

=== Bankruptcy and final years ===
With the turn of the new century, Hesse's commercial fortunes declined. Unable to settle his numerous debts, he was subjected to bankruptcy proceedings by the Pskov District Court. On 30 November 1904, the merchant August Hesse was officially declared insolvent. To satisfy his creditors, he was compelled to sell the leather factory and the property on Sergievskaya Street.

Hesse continued to work as an insurance agent after selling his property. The factory was acquired by the Russo-Baltic Joint-Stock Company. The house on Sergievskaya Street was purchased in 1905 by the Saint Petersburg nobleman Leonid Lanceray, chairman of the board of the Russian Insurance Society, for which Hesse had long served as inspector. The house soon passed into the ownership of the Insurance Society itself. It retained its commercial status, and Hesse continued to live and work there. His son Alexander also resided there, remaining after his father's death until his departure for Estonia in 1919.

Insurance work remained Hesse's main source of income, bringing in at least 1,500 rubles a year and enabling him to continue supporting charitable institutions. In 1905 he was granted hereditary honorary citizenship, an estate status in the Russian Empire.

August Hesse died on 23 October [O.S. 10 October] 1916 and was buried in the Lutheran cemetery at the Church of St. James.

== Hesse House ==
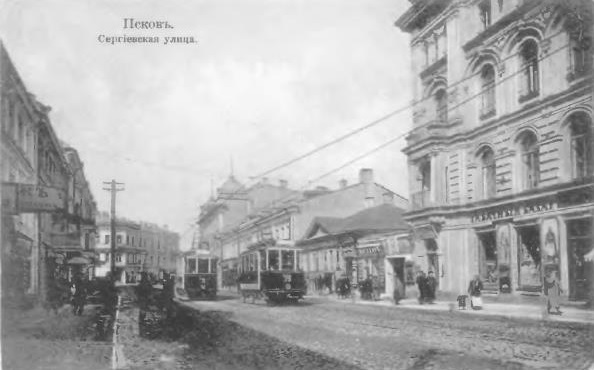
Sergievskaya Street on a late 19th-century postcard. Part of the Hesse House façade is visible on the right, with a sign for the "Tobacco Bazaar" shop

The apartment building on Sergievskaya Street is described by Pleskov as Pskov's first four-storey building. Its Renaissance Revival façade has extensive relief ornamentation, and the building has borne Hesse's name since its construction. It is recognised as a regional cultural heritage site for its residential architecture and its association with the history of commerce in Pskov. This status was reaffirmed in 2012.

Nesturkh's design combined contemporary construction methods with an ornate façade. Shortly after the building's completion, in February 1897 the Pskov City Leaflet (Russian: Псковский городской листок) wrote that "Mr Hesse's house, which has beautified the whole of Sergievskaya Street", served as "the finest example of the merits of F. P. Nesturkh's buildings". Before the Revolution, in addition to apartments, Hesse's insurance office, and the women's school, the building housed jewellery and tobacco shops, as well as other commercial enterprises. After the Revolution, the Hesse House was nationalised. During the Russian Civil War, it served as the headquarters of the revolutionary forces commanded by Jānis Fabriciuss, who at the time held the post of chairman of the Military Revolutionary Committee of Pskov District. During the Soviet era, the building went through a period of communal apartments and housed shops and grocery stores. The restored house remains part of the historic streetscape of central Pskov.
