= Jānis Fabriciuss =

Latvian Soviet commander and commissar

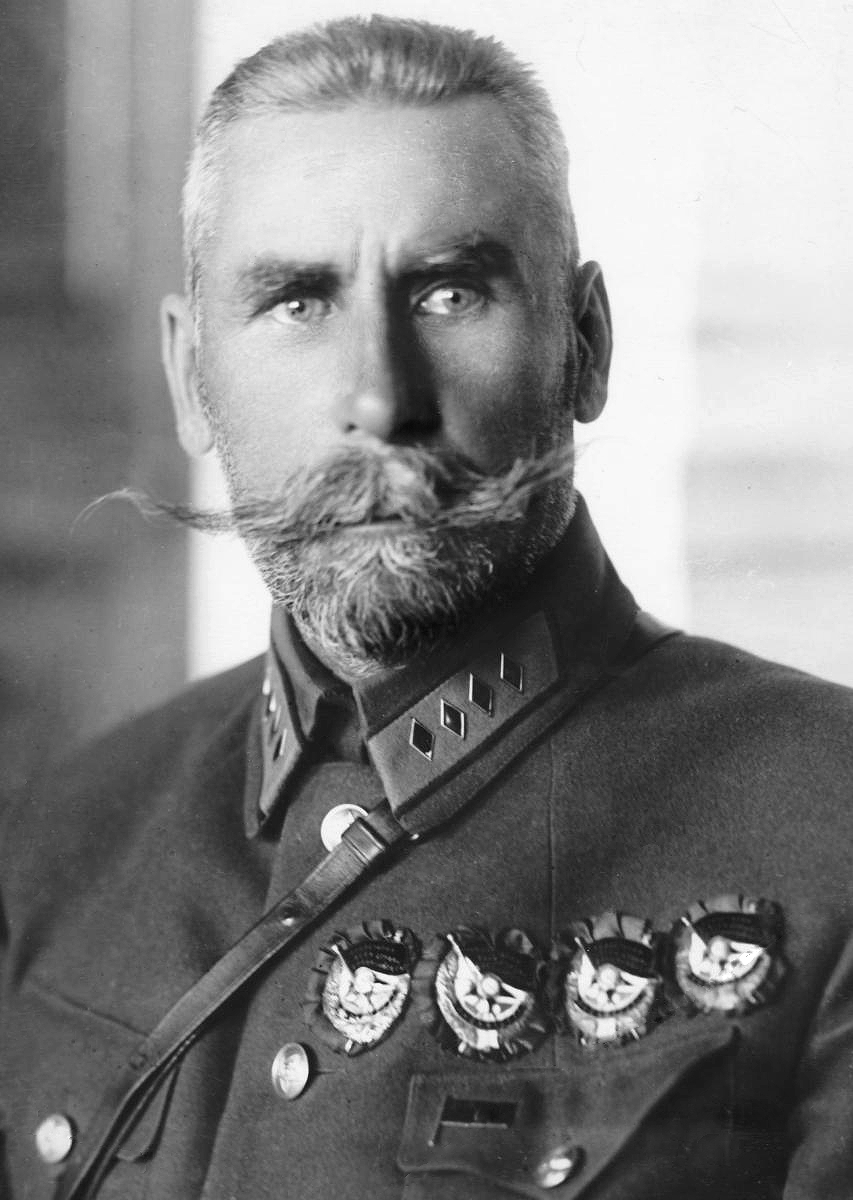
- Jānis Fabriciuss in 1928
- Born: 26 June 1877 [O.S. 14 June] Zlēkas Parish, Ventspils apriņķis, Courland Governorate; Russian Empire
- Died: 6 August 1929 (aged 52); Near the city of Sochi, Russian SFSR; Soviet Union
- Military career
- Allegiance: Russian Empire (1900–1917); Soviet Russia (1917–1922); Soviet Union (1922–1929)
- Branch: (Russian Empire) Imperial Russian Army; Red Army
- Service years: 1900–1917; 1917–1929
- Rank: Regiment commander
- Nickname: Iron Martyn
- Commands: 2nd (9th) Don Rifle Division; 17th Rifle Corps; 4th Rifle Corps; Assistant commander of the Red Banner Caucasus Army
- Awards: Order of the Red Banner (4x); Honorary Revolutionary Weapon

Jānis Fabriciuss (Russian: Ян Фри́цевич Фабри́циус, Jan Fritsevich Fabricius; 26 June [O. S. 14 June] 1877 – 24 August 1929) was a Latvian Soviet commander and commissar of the Red Army.

== Biography ==
Jānis Fabriciuss was born into the family of Latvian farm workers near Ventspils in the Courland Governorate. He was active in the revolutionary movement since 1891 and participated in different protests such as the "Potato Riots" which was a workers' strike in Windawa. He graduated from the Alexander Gymnasium in Riga in 1894.

He started his military in the Imperial Russian Army in 1900 and served in the Lithuanian Life Guards Regiment. After being transferred reserve, he worked at a Riga machine-building plant. Fabriciuss joined of the Russian Social Democratic Labour Party in 1903 and in 1904, he was sentenced by the Riga District Court to four years in hard labor with subsequent exile to Yakutia. During the years 1913 to 1915, he served his exile in Sakhalin.

In 1915 he was called up for military service again and enlisted in the 1st Latvian Rifle Regiment. He fought with the regiment on the Northern Front and was wounded four times. He rose to the rank of senior non-commissioned officer. According to other publications of the post-Soviet period, by the February Revolution, Fabricius was still on Sakhalin.

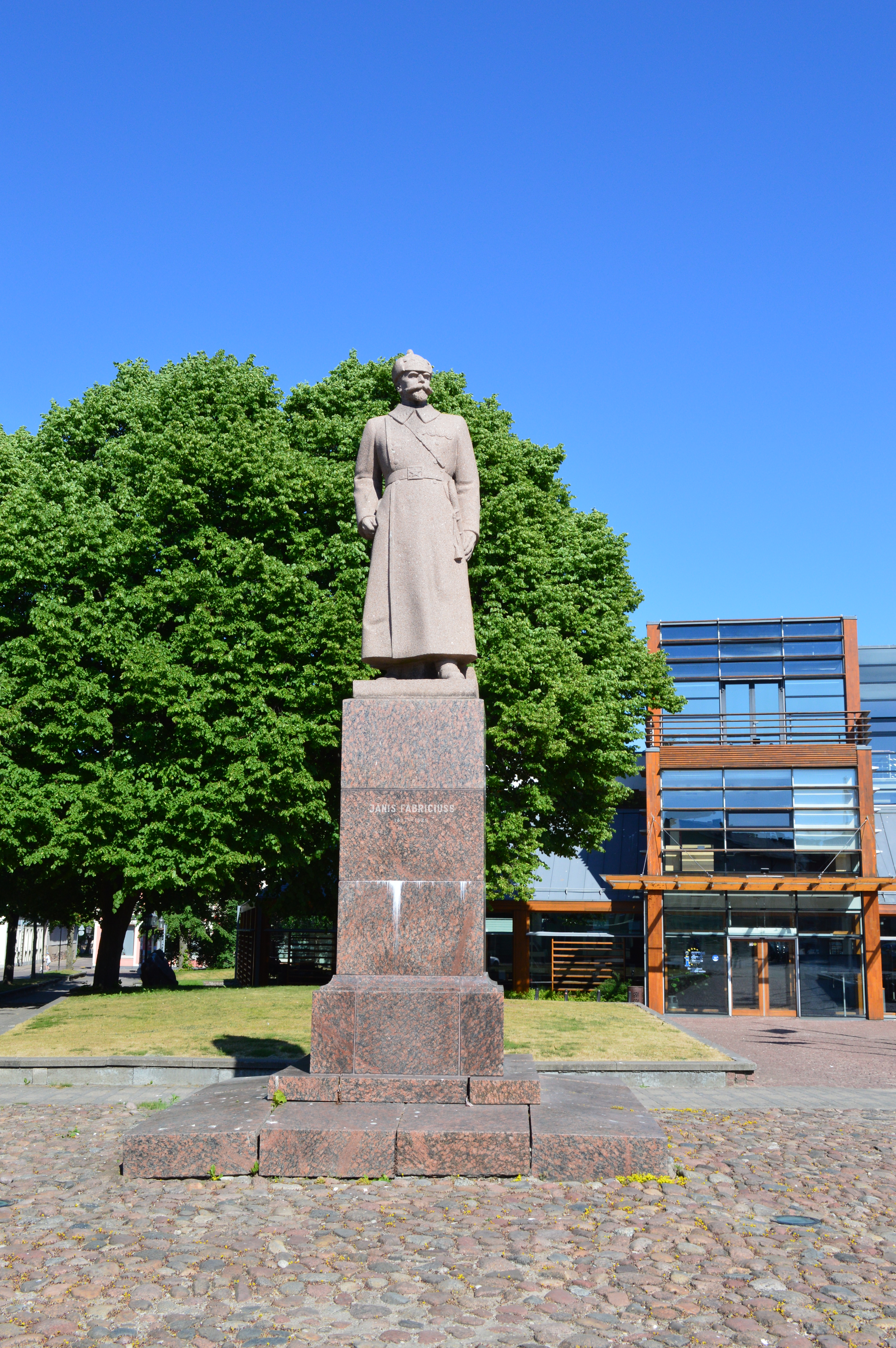
Monument to Jānis Fabriciuss in Ventspils

On 23 April 1917 he was a member of the Sakhalin Council of Workers' and Soldiers' Deputies, after which he left for Moscow.

From January 1918 he was a member of the All-Russian Central Executive Committee. From February 1918 he served as the commander of the Gdov detachment and then military commissar of the Gdov-Toroshinsky region, the chairman of the Military Revolutionary Committee of the Pskov district. Fabriciuss distinguished himself in battles against the German interventionists and rebel formations under the command of Sergei Bulak-Balakhovich. In late 1918 - early 1919, he was the commissar of the 2nd Novgorod rifle division during the liberation of Latvia.

On 13 February 1919 Fabriciuss was awarded the Order of the Red Banner No. 4, becoming one of the first holders of the highest award (at that time) of the RSFSR.

From February 1919, he was a military commissar of the 10th Rifle Division in battles in Estonia. From August 1919, the head of the Livno-Yeletsk defense region for the campaign against the cavalry of Konstantin Mamontov during his of the southern of the Soviet troops. From October 1919, he was the commander of the 48th Infantry Brigade of the 16th Infantry Division of the 8th Army of the Red Army and took part in the defeat of the troops of General A.I. Denikin and in the Soviet-Polish war. From January 1921 he was the chief and military commissar of the 43rd United Courses of the command staff of the Red Army. He was a delegate of the 10th Congress of the Communist Party. He participated in the suppression of the Kronstadt Mutiny of 1921 as the commander of the 501st Infantry Regiment.

Fabriciuss served as the first commander of the United Belarusian Military School from 1921 to 1922.

From January 1924 he was the commander of the 17th Rifle Corps in the Ukrainian Military District.

Commander of the 4th Rifle Corps in Vitebsk (1927–1928) and in 1928, assistant commander of the Red Banner Caucasus Army (KKA). From 1927 he was a member of the Central Control Commission of the VKP (b).

On 24 August 1929 Fabriciuss drowned while rescuing the drowning passengers of the Kalinin K-4 plane, which crashed into the sea near the city of Sochi.

== Awards ==
Fabriciuss is the first four-time holder of the highest state award (at that time), the Order of the Red Banner. The first order was awarded in 1919 "For continuous selfless work at the front in fire", the second, "For distinction in breaking through the defense of the White Poles near Smorgon on 14 July 1920", the third, "for participation in the suppression of the Kronstadt rebellion", the fourth, "for battles in the attack on Warsaw and subsequent rearguard battles "in 1921. According to the official version, the Order of the Red Banner No. 4 was awarded to Fabricius in 1919. According to another version, this order was attributed to him later, already retroactively.

He was also a recipient of the Honorary Revolutionary Weapon award.

== Bibliography ==
- Елина Н. Железный Мартын // «Филателия СССР». — 1977. — No. 8. — С. 54.
- Кондратьев Н. Д. Ян Фабрициус. — М., 1957.
- Кондратьев Н. Д. Ян Фабрициус. — Рига, 1954.
- Кондратьев Н. Д. На фронте в огне: Эпизоды из жизни Яна Фабрициуса. — М.: Политиздат, 1982. — 128 с. — (Герои Советской Родины).
- Краснознамённый Киевский. Очерки истории Краснознамённого Киевского военного округа (1919–1979). Издание второе, исправленное и дополненное. Киев, издательство политической литературы Украины, 1979. Командир 17-го стрелкового корпуса Фабрициус Я. Ф. и состав корпуса — с.59-60.
- Легендарный комбриг. Воспоминания о Я. Ф. Фабрициусе. — Рига, 1971.
- Чудов И. С. Ян Фабрициус. — М., 1960.
- Great Soviet Encyclopedia
- Soviet Military Encyclopedia
- Л. Кафанова. Последний подвиг Фабрициуса // «Огонёк». — 1959. — No. 27(1672). — С. 12.
