= Paul von Hindenburg =

President of Germany from 1925 to 1934

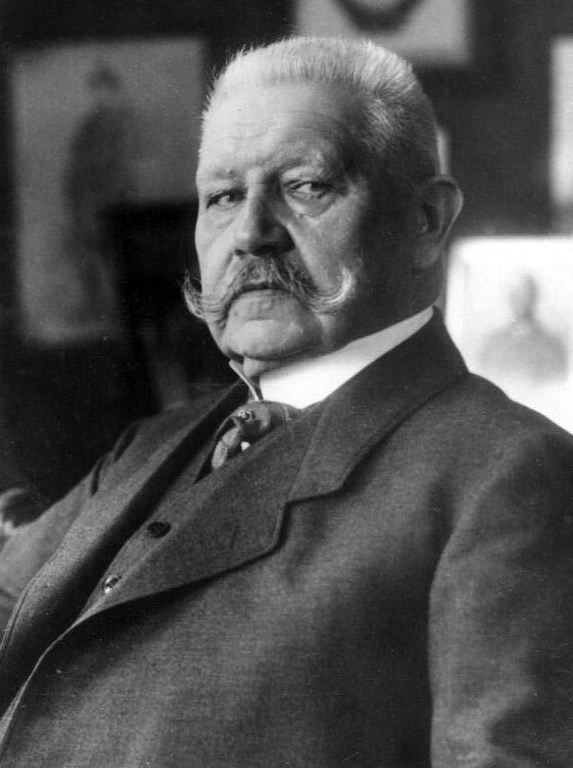
- Hindenburg in 1925

President of Germany
- In office 12 May 1925 – 2 August 1934
- Chancellors: See list: Hans Luther; Wilhelm Marx; Hermann Müller; Heinrich Brüning; Franz von Papen; Kurt von Schleicher; Adolf Hitler
- Preceded by: Friedrich Ebert (Note: Chancellor Hans Luther and the Reichsgericht President Walter Simons served successively as acting presidents from Ebert's death until Hindenburg took office.)
- Succeeded by: Adolf Hitler (as Führer)

Chief of the Great General Staff
- In office 29 August 1916 – 3 July 1919
- Monarch: Wilhelm II
- Deputy: Erich Ludendorff (as First Quartermaster-General)
- Preceded by: Erich von Falkenhayn
- Succeeded by: Wilhelm Groener

Personal details
- Born: Paul Ludwig Hans Anton von Beneckendorff und von Hindenburg; 2 October 1847 Posen, Prussia
- Died: 2 August 1934 (aged 86) Neudeck, Germany
- Resting place: St. Elizabeth's Church, Marburg
- Party: Independent
- Spouse: Gertrud von Sperling (m. 1879; died 1921)
- Children: 3, including Oskar
- Relatives: Erich von Manstein (nephew)

Military service
- Allegiance: German Empire; Kingdom of Prussia
- Branch/service: Imperial German Army; Prussian Army
- Years of service: 1866–1911; 1914–1918
- Rank: Generalfeldmarschall
- Battles/wars: Expand list: Austro-Prussian War; Battle of Königgrätz; Franco-Prussian War; Battle of Gravelotte; World War I; Russian invasion of East Prussia (1914); Battle of Tannenberg; First Battle of the Masurian Lakes; Battle of Augustów; Battle of the Vistula River; Battle of Łódź; Battle of the Four Rivers; Second Battle of the Masurian Lakes; First Battle of Przasnysz; Battle of Humin-Bolimów; Battle of Łomża; German summer offensive (1915); Attack of the Dead Men; Bug–Narew offensive; Siege of Novogeorgievsk; Riga–Schaulen offensive; Vilno-Dvinsk offensive; Lake Naroch offensive; Battle of Verdun; Baranovichi offensive; Brusilov offensive; Second Brusilov offensive; German spring offensive
- Awards: Star of the Grand Cross of the Iron Cross; Pour le Mérite

Paul Ludwig Hans Anton von Beneckendorff und von Hindenburg (Note: German pronunciation: [paʊl ˈluːtvɪç hans ˈʔantoːn fɔn ˈbɛnəkn̩dɔʁf ʔʊnt fɔn ˈhɪndn̩bʊʁk].) (2 October 1847 – 2 August 1934) was a German military officer and statesman who led the Imperial German Army during World War I and later became President of Germany from 1925 until his death in 1934. Though ideologically opposed to Nazism, he played a key role in the Nazi seizure of power in 1933 through his appointment of Adolf Hitler as Chancellor of Germany.

Hindenburg was born to a family of minor Prussian nobility in the Grand Duchy of Posen. Upon completing his education as a cadet, he enlisted in the Third Regiment of Foot Guards. In this unit, Hindenburg saw combat during the Austro-Prussian and Franco-Prussian wars. In 1873, he was admitted to the Prussian War College in Berlin, where he studied before being appointed to the General Staff Corps. In 1885, he was promoted to major and became a member of the German General Staff. After teaching at the War Academy, Hindenburg rose to the rank of lieutenant general by 1900. In 1911, he retired from the military.

After World War I broke out in July 1914, Hindenburg was recalled and achieved fame on the Eastern Front as the victor of the Battle of Tannenberg. On 1 November 1914, he was promoted to field marshal and named commander of all German forces in the East. Hindenburg's continued success in battling the Russians ultimately made him a national hero and the center of an extensive personality cult. By 1916, his popularity had risen to the point that he replaced General Erich von Falkenhayn as Chief of the Great General Staff, the commander-in-chief of the German Army. Thereafter, he and his deputy, General Erich Ludendorff, took advantage of Kaiser Wilhelm II's immense delegation of authority to the Supreme Army Command to establish a de facto military dictatorship. Under their leadership, the German Empire secured Russia's defeat on the Eastern Front and achieved the largest advance on the Western Front seen since the early days of the war. However, Germany was eventually defeated in the Second Battle of the Marne and the Allies' Hundred Days Offensive. Following the armistice, Hindenburg stepped down as Chief of the Army General Staff before retiring again from the military in 1919.

In 1925, Hindenburg returned to public life to become the second elected president of the Weimar Republic. Opposed to Hitler and the Nazi Party, Hindenburg nonetheless played a major role in the instability that resulted in their rise to power. After twice dissolving the Reichstag in 1932, Hindenburg reluctantly agreed in January 1933 to appoint Hitler as chancellor in coalition with the German National People's Party. In response to the February 1933 Reichstag fire, Hindenburg approved the Reichstag Fire Decree, which suspended various civil liberties. He likewise signed the Enabling Act of 1933, which gave the Nazi regime emergency powers. After Hindenburg died the following year, Hitler combined the presidency with the chancellery before declaring himself Führer (lit. 'Leader') of Germany and transforming the country into a totalitarian dictatorship.

== Early life and education ==
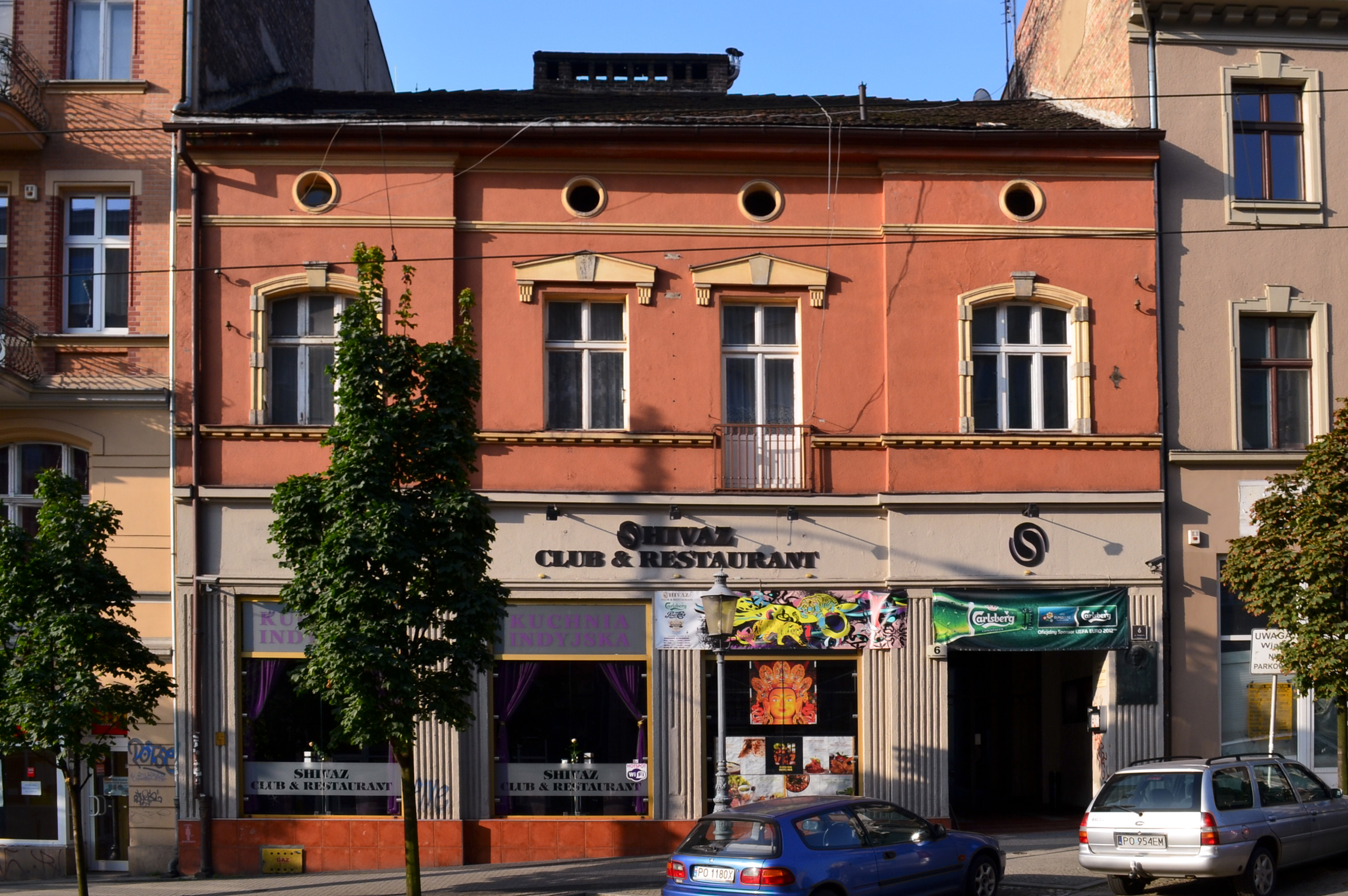
Hindenburg's birthplace in Poznań on Podgórna Street (formerly Hindenburgstrasse in Posen)

Hindenburg was born in Posen, in what was then the Kingdom of Prussia and is now Poznań in western Poland. He was the son of Prussian junker Hans Robert Ludwig von Beneckendorff und von Hindenburg (1816–1902) and his wife Luise Schwickart (1825–1893), the daughter of physician Karl Ludwig Schwickart and wife Julie Moennich. His paternal grandparents were Otto Ludwig Fady von Beneckendorff und von Hindenburg (1778–1855), through whom he was remotely descended from the illegitimate daughter of Count Heinrich VI of Waldeck, and his wife Eleonore von Brederfady (d. 1863). Hindenburg's younger brothers and sister were Otto (b. 1849), Ida (b. 1851) and Bernhard (b. 1859). His family were all Lutheran Protestants in the Evangelical Church of Prussia.

At age 11, Paul entered the Cadet Corps School at Wahlstatt (now Legnickie Pole, Poland). At 16, he was transferred to the School in Berlin, and, at 18, he served as a page to the widow of King Frederick William IV of Prussia. Graduates entering the army were presented to King William I, who asked for their father's name and rank. He became a second lieutenant in the Third Regiment of Foot Guards.

== In the Prussian Army ==
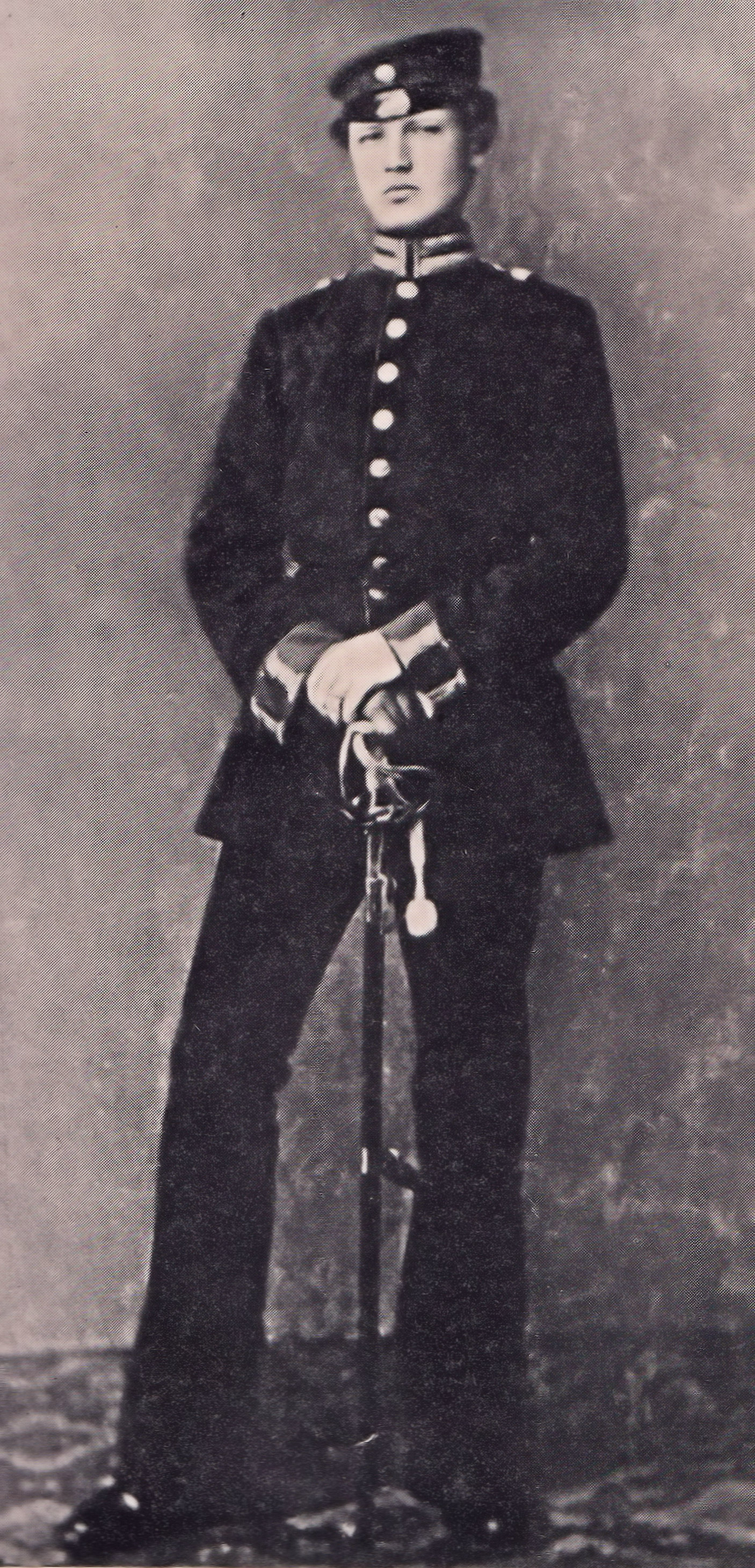
Hindenburg as a lieutenant in the 3rd Garderegiment in 1870

=== Action in two wars ===
When the Austro-Prussian War of 1866 broke out, Hindenburg wrote to his parents: "I rejoice in this bright-coloured future. For the soldier, war is the normal state of things [...] If I fall, it is the most honorable and beautiful death". During the decisive Battle of Königgrätz, he was knocked unconscious when a bullet pierced his helmet and creased his skull. Upon regaining consciousness, he wrapped his head in a towel, resumed command of his detachment, and was later decorated. He was a battalion adjutant when the Franco-Prussian War (1870–1871) broke out. After weeks of marching, the Guards attacked the village of Saint Privat (near Metz). Climbing a gentle slope, they came under heavy fire from the superior French rifles. After four hours, the Prussian artillery came up to blast the French lines while the infantry, filled with the "holy lust of battle", swept through the French lines. His regiment suffered 1096 casualties, and he became a regimental adjutant. The Guards were spectators at the Battle of Sedan and for the following months sat in the siege lines surrounding Paris. He was his regiment's elected representative at the Palace of Versailles when the German Empire was proclaimed on 18 January 1871; at 1.98 m (6 feet 6 inches) tall with a muscular frame and striking blue eyes, he was an impressive figure. After the French surrender, he watched from afar the suppression of the Paris Commune.

=== General Staff ===
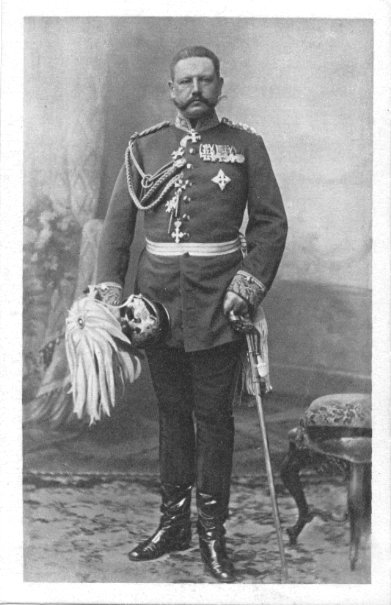
Hindenburg became a major general of the General Staff in 1897.

In 1873, he passed the entrance examination for admission to the Kriegsakademie in Berlin. After three years of study, his grades were high enough for an appointment with the General Staff. He was promoted to captain in 1878 and assigned to the staff of the II Corps. He married Gertrud von Sperling (1860–1921), daughter of General Oskar von Sperling, in 1879. The couple would have two daughters, Irmengard Pauline (1880) and Annemaria (1891), and one son, Oskar (1883). Next, he commanded an infantry company, in which his men were ethnic Poles.

He was transferred in 1885 to the General Staff and was promoted to major. His section was led by Count Alfred von Schlieffen, a student of encirclement battles like Cannae, whose Schlieffen Plan proposed to pocket the French Army. For five years, Hindenburg also taught tactics at the Kriegsakademie. At the maneuvers of 1885, he met the future Kaiser Wilhelm II; they met again at the next year's war game in which Hindenburg commanded the "Russian army". He learned the topography of the lakes and sand barrens of East Prussia during the annual Great General Staff's ride in 1888. The following year, he moved to the War Ministry to write the field service regulations on field-engineering and on the use of heavy artillery in field engagements; both were used during the First World War. He became a lieutenant colonel in 1891 and, two years later, was promoted to colonel, commanding an infantry regiment. He became chief of staff of the VIII Corps in 1896.

=== Field commands and retirement ===
Hindenburg became a major general (equivalent to a British and US brigadier general) in 1897, and in 1900, he was promoted to lieutenant general (equivalent to major general) and received command of the 28th Infantry Division. Five years later, he was made commander of the IV Corps based in Magdeburg as a General of the Infantry (lieutenant-general; the German equivalent to four-star rank was Colonel-General). The annual maneuvers taught him how to maneuver a large force; in 1908, he defeated a corps commanded by the Kaiser. Schlieffen recommended him as Chief of the General Staff in 1909, but he lost out to Helmuth von Moltke. He retired in 1911 "to make way for younger men". He had been in the army for 46 years, including 14 years in General Staff positions.

== World War I ==
=== 1914 ===
==== Assumption of command in East Prussia ====
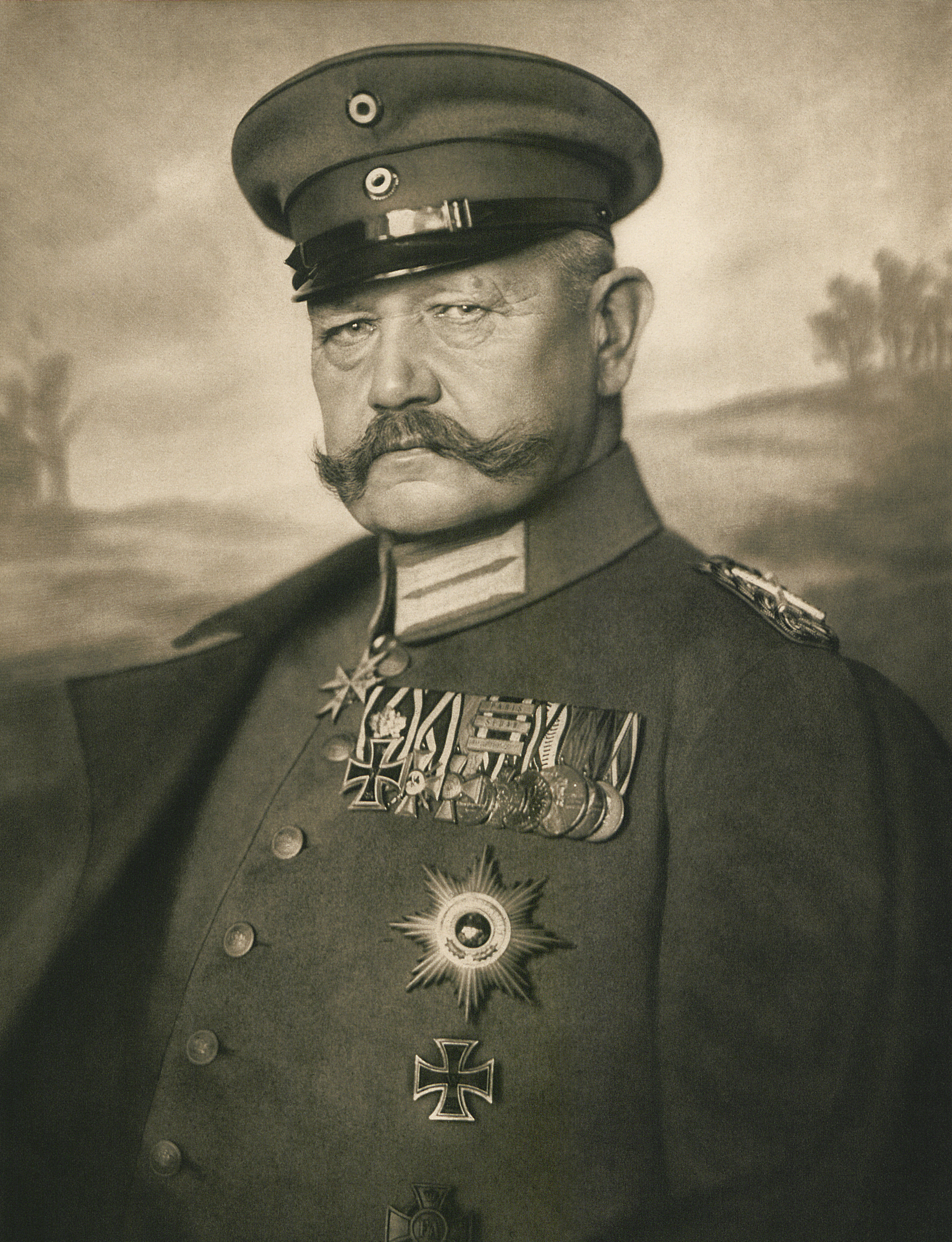
Field Marshal Hindenburg in 1914

When WWI broke out, Hindenburg was living in retirement in Hannover. On 22 August, due to the purge of German command following Russian success in East Prussia, he was selected by the War Cabinet and the German Supreme Army Command (Oberste Heeresleitung, OHL) to assume command of the German Eighth Army in East Prussia, with General Erich Ludendorff as his chief of staff. After the Eighth Army had been defeated by the Russian 1st Army at Gumbinnen, it had found itself in danger of encirclement as the Russian 2nd Army under General Alexander Samsonov advanced from the south towards the Vistula River. Momentarily panicked, Eighth Army commander Maximilian von Prittwitz notified OHL of his intent to withdraw his forces into Western Prussia. The Chief of the German General Staff, Generaloberst Helmuth von Moltke, responded by relieving Prittwitz and replacing him with Hindenburg.

==== Tannenberg ====
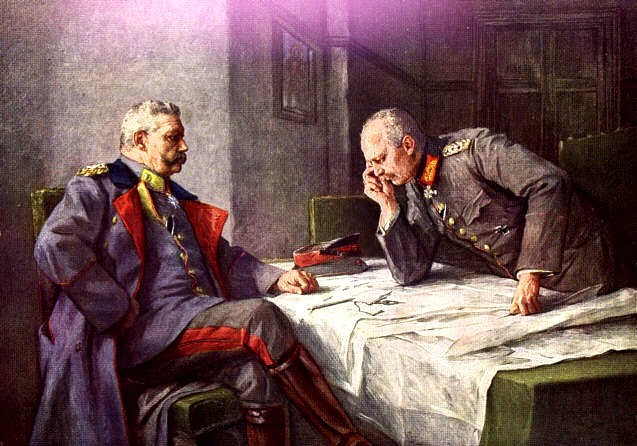
Depiction of Hindenburg and Erich Ludendorff at the battle of Tannenberg (painting by Hugo Vogel)

Upon arriving at Marienburg on 23 August, Hindenburg and Ludendorff were met by members of the 8th Army's staff led by Lieutenant Colonel Max Hoffmann. Hoffman informed them of his plans to shift part of the 8th Army south to attack the exposed left flank of the advancing Russian Second Army. Agreeing with Hoffman's strategy, Hindenburg authorised Ludendorff to transfer most of the 8th Army south while leaving only two cavalry brigades to face the Russian First Army in the north. In Hindenburg's words, the line of soldiers defending Germany's border was "thin, but not weak", because the men were defending their homes. If pushed too hard by the Second Army, he believed they would cede ground only gradually as German reinforcements continued to mass on the invading Russians' flanks before ultimately encircling and annihilating them.

On the night of 25 August, Hindenburg told his staff, "Gentlemen, our preparations are so well in hand that we can sleep soundly tonight". On the day of the battle, Hindenburg reportedly watched from a hilltop as his forces' weak center gradually gave ground until the sudden roar of German guns to his right heralded the surprise attack on the Russians' flanks. Ultimately, the Battle of Tannenberg resulted in the destruction of the Russian 2nd Army, with 92,000 Russians captured together with four hundred guns, while German casualties numbered only 14,000. According to British field marshal Edmund Ironside, it was the "greatest defeat suffered by any of the combatants during the war". Recognising the victory's propaganda value, Hindenburg suggested naming the battle "Tannenberg" as a way of "avenging" the defeat inflicted on the Order of the Teutonic Knights by the Polish and Lithuanian knights in 1410, even though it was fought nowhere near the field of Tannenberg.

After this decisive victory, Hindenburg repositioned the Eighth Army to face the Russian First Army. Hindenburg's tactics spurned head-on attacks all along the front in favor of schwerpunkte: sharp, localised hammer blows. Two schwerpunkte struck in the First Battle of the Masurian Lakes. Two columns drove east from these breakthrough points to pocket the Russians led by General Paul von Rennenkampf, who managed to retreat 100 km (62 mi) with heavy losses. In the first six weeks of the war the Russians had lost more than 310,000 men.

==== Defending Silesia ====
On the east bank of the Vistula in Congress Poland, the Russians were mobilising new armies which were shielded from attack by the river; once assembled, they would cross the river to march west into Silesia. To counter the Russians' pending invasion of Silesia, Hindenburg advanced into Poland and occupied the west bank of the Vistula opposite where Russian forces were mobilising. He set up headquarters at Posen in West Prussia, accompanied by Ludendorff and Hoffmann. When the Russians attempted to cross the Vistula, the German forces under his command held firm, but the Russians were able to cross into the Austro-Hungarian sector to the south. Hindenburg retreated and destroyed all railways and bridges so that the Russians would be unable to advance beyond 120 km (75 mi) west of their railheads — well short of the German frontier.

On 1 November 1914, Hindenburg was appointed Ober Ost (commander in the east) and was promoted to field marshal. To meet the Russians' renewed push into Silesia, Hindenburg moved the Ninth Army by rail north to Thorn and reinforced it with two corps from the Eighth Army. On 11 November, in a raging snowstorm, his forces surprised the Russian flank in the fierce battle of Łódź, which ended the immediate Russian threat to Silesia and also captured Poland's second largest city.

=== 1915 ===
==== Counterattacks in East Prussia and Poland ====
After the Russians launched an offensive from Galicia toward Hungary, Hindenburg mounted an unsuccessful attack in Poland with his Ninth Army as well as an offensive by the newly formed Tenth Army which made only local gains. Following these setbacks, he set up temporary headquarters at Insterburg, and made plans to eliminate the Russians' remaining toehold in East Prussia by ensnaring them in a pincer movement between the Tenth Army in the north and Eighth Army in the south. On February 7, Hindenburg's forces launched the attack, encircling an entire corps and capturing more than 100,000 men in the Second Battle of the Masurian Lakes.

Shortly thereafter, Hindenburg and Ludendorff played a key role in the Central Powers' Gorlice–Tarnów Offensive. As Field Marshal August von Mackensen broke through Russian lines between Gorlice and Tarnów, Hindenburg's Ninth and Tenth Army launched diversionary attacks that threatened Riga in the north. In one of the war's most successful cavalry actions, three cavalry divisions swept east into Courland, the barren, sandy region near the Baltic coast. The cavalry's gains were held by Hindenburg's new Nieman army, named after the river.

In June, the Supreme Army Command ordered Hindenburg to launch a Bug-Narew Offensive in Poland toward the Narew River north of Warsaw. Hindenburg created Army Group Gallwitz, named after its commander. Max von Gallwitz was one of many able commanders selected by Hindenburg, who stayed at the new army's headquarters to be available if needed. (When Berlin approved the new army group, it became Twelfth Army.) The army group broke through the Russian lines after a brief, but intense, bombardment directed by Lieutenant Colonel Georg Bruchmüller, an artillery genius recalled from medical retirement. One-third of the opposing Russian First Army were casualties in the first five hours. Thereafter, the Russians withdrew across the Narew River.

==== Evacuation of Poland ====
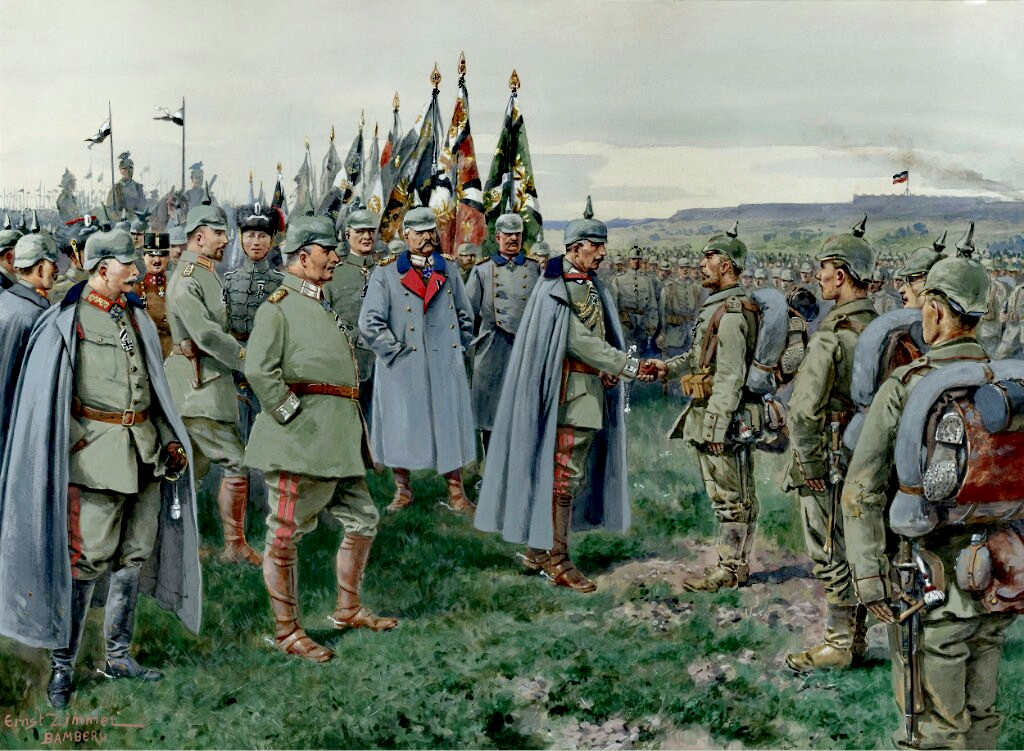
The Emperor presents the Iron Cross to the Heroes of Novogeorgievsk (painting by Ernst Zimmer).

On 1 June, Hindenburg's Nieman and Tenth Armies spearheaded attacks into the Latvian Courland in an attempt to pocket the defenders. Ultimately, this plan was foiled by the prudent commander of the Fifth Russian Army who defied orders by withdrawing into defensible positions shielding Riga.

Despite the setback in Latvia, Hindenburg and Ludendorff continued to rack up victories on the Eastern Front. In August, the Germans stormed the Novogeorgievsk fortress. Numerous Russian sources call the fall of Novogeorgievsk the most shameful page in the history of the Russian Imperial army. The German Tenth Army besieged Kovno, a Lithuanian city on the Nieman River, defended by a circle of forts. It fell on 17 August, along with 1,300 guns and almost 1 million shells. On 5 August, his forces were consolidated into Army Group Hindenburg, which took the city of Grodno after bitter street fighting but could not trap the retreating defenders because the rail lines lacked the capacity to bring up the needed men. They occupied Vilnius on 18 September, then halted on ground favorable for a defensive line. On 6 August, German troops under Hindenburg used chlorine gas against Russian troops defending Osowiec Fortress. The Russians demolished much of Osowiec and withdrew on 18 August.

In October, Hindenburg moved his headquarters to Kovno. They were responsible for 108,800 km^{2} (42,000 mi^{2}) of conquered Russian territory, which was home to three million people and became known as Ober Ost. The troops built fortifications on the eastern border while Ludendorff "with his ruthless energy" headed the civil government, using forced labor to repair the war damages and to dispatch useful products, like hogs, to Germany. A Hindenburg son-in-law, who was a reserve officer and a legal expert, joined the staff to write a new legal code.

=== 1916 ===
==== Brusilov Offensive ====
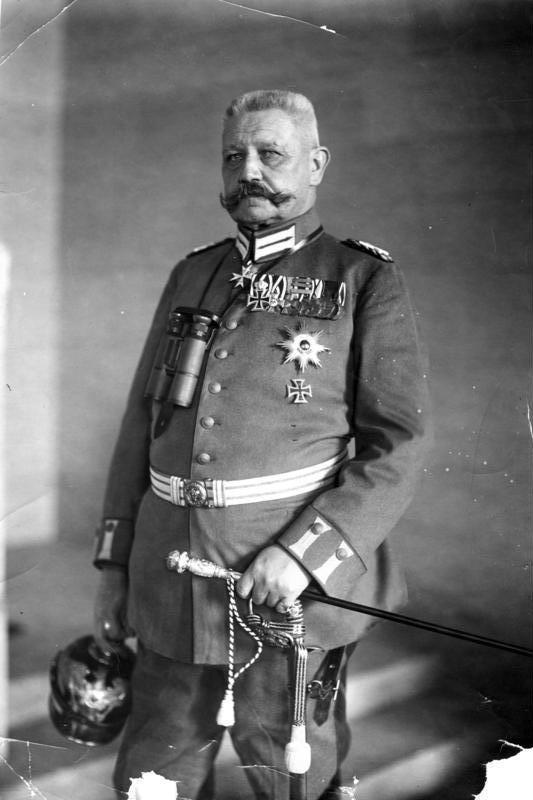
Hindenburg in 1916

In the spring of 1916, the Central Powers experienced a military catastrophe in the East that left Germany bearing much of the war effort until the end of hostilities. On 4 June, the Russian Army began a massive offensive along 480 km (300 mi) of the southwestern front in present-day western Ukraine. In the ensuing onslaught, four armies commanded by General Aleksei Brusilov overwhelmed entrenchments that the Austro-Hungarians long regarded as impregnable.

Under Hindenburg's command, Ober Ost desperately shored up weak points with soldiers stripped from less threatened positions. Ludendorff was so distraught on the phone to OHL that General Wilhelm Groener (who directed the army's railroads and had been a competitor with Ludendorff on the General Staff) was sent to evaluate his nerves, which were judged satisfactory. For a week the Russians kept attacking: they lost 80,000 men; the defenders 16,000. On 16 July, the Russians attacked the German lines west of Riga but were ultimately thwarted. When looking back on the Russian offensive, Hindenburg admitted that another attack of such scale and ferocity would have left his forces "faced with the menace of a complete collapse."

==== Commander of the Eastern Front ====
After having their strength decimated by the Russians in the Brusilov Offensive, the Austro-Hungarian forces submitted their Eastern Front forces to Hindenburg's command on 27 July (except for Archduke Karl's Army Group in southeast Galicia, in which General Hans von Seeckt was chief of staff). General von Eichhorn took over Army Group Hindenburg, while Hindenburg and Ludendorff, on a staff train equipped with the most advanced communication apparatus, visited their new forces. At threatened points, they formed mixed German and Austro-Hungarian units while other Austro-Hungarian formations were bolstered by a sprinkling of German officers. Officers were exchanged between the German and Austro-Hungarian armies for training. Their front was almost 1,000 km (620 mi) and their only reserves were a cavalry brigade plus some artillery and machine gunners.

==== Supreme Commander of the Central Powers ====
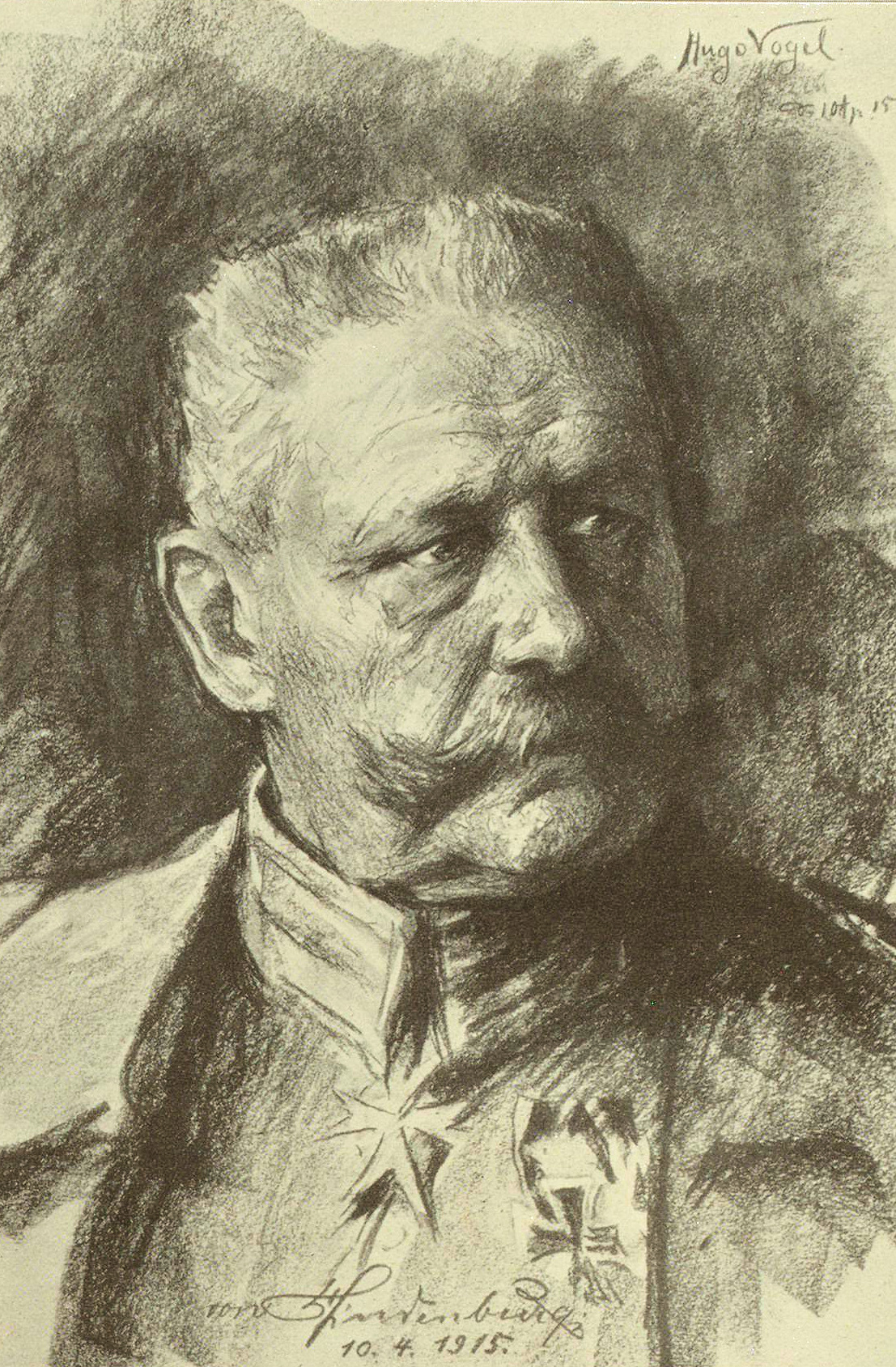
Hindenburg drawn by his friend Hugo Vogel

In the west, the Germans were hemorrhaging in the battles of Verdun and the Somme. Influential Army officers, lobbied against the leadership of the Army Chief of Staff, General Erich von Falkenhayn, in favor of Hindenburg. The tipping point came when Falkenhayn ordered a spoiling attack by Bulgaria on Entente lines in Macedonia that failed with heavy losses. Thus emboldened, Romania declared war on Austro-Hungary on 27 August, adding 650,000 trained enemies who invaded Hungarian Transylvania. This outcome contrasted sharply with Falkenhayn's assurances to Kaiser Wilhelm II and his ministers that Romania would remain neutral. Consequently, the Kaiser began deliberating over who should assume leadership of the Supreme Army Command in Falkenhayn's place.

On 29 August 1916, Field Marshal Hindenburg was summoned to Pless and named Chief of the Great General Staff, thereby assuming leadership of the Supreme Army Command. Upon taking command, Hindenburg named Ludendorff as his deputy while entrusting him with the signing of most orders, directives, and daily press reports. The eastern front was commanded by Leopold of Bavaria, with Hoffmann as his chief of staff. Hindenburg was also appointed the Supreme War Commander of the Central Powers, with nominal control over six million men.

Hindenburg and Ludendorff visited the Western Front in September, meeting the Army commanders and their staffs as well as their leaders: Crown Prince Rupprecht of Bavaria, Albrecht, Duke of Württemberg and Crown Prince Wilhelm of Prussia. Both crown princes, with Prussian chiefs of staff, commanded Army Groups. Rupprecht and Albrecht were presented with field marshals' batons. Hindenburg told them that they must stand on the defensive until Romania was dealt with, defensive tactics must be improved, and ideas were welcome. A backup defensive line, which the Entente called the Hindenburg Line, would be constructed immediately. Ludendorff promised more arms. Rupprecht was delighted that two such competent men had "replaced the dilettante "Falkenhayn". Bauer was impressed that Hindenburg "saw everything only with the eye of the soldier."

==== Bolstering defense ====
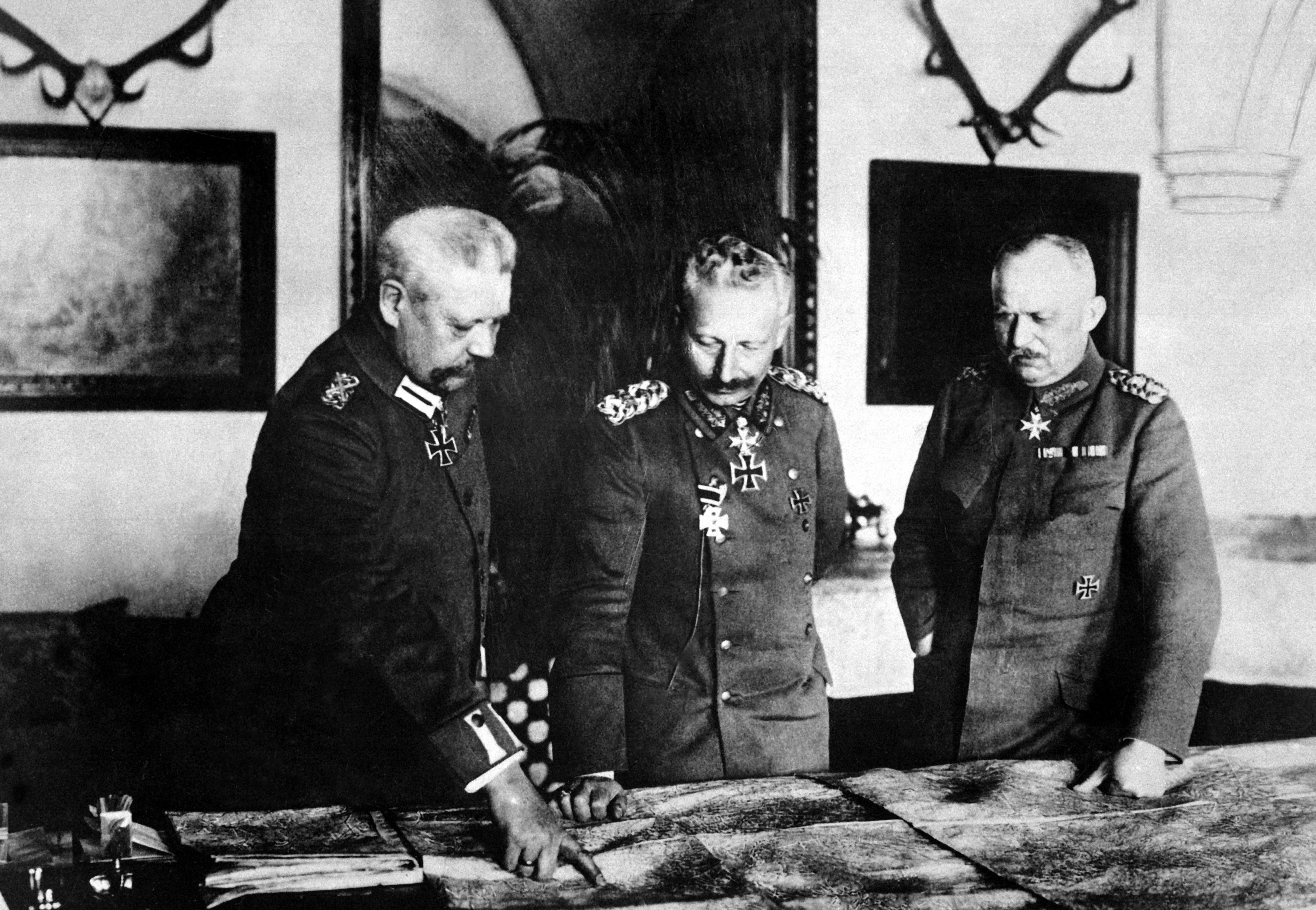
Hindenburg, Wilhelm II, Ludendorff, January 1917

Under Field Marshal Hindenburg's leadership, the German Supreme Army Command issued a Textbook of Defensive Warfare that recommended fewer defenders in the front line, relying on light machine guns. If pushed too hard, they were permitted to pull back. Front-line defenses were organized so that penetrating enemy forces found themselves cut down by machine gun fire and artillery from those who knew the ranges and location of their own strong points. Subsequently, the infantry would counterattack while the attacker's artillery was blind because they were unsure where their own men were. A reserve division was positioned immediately behind the line; if it entered the battle, it was commanded by the division whose position had been penetrated. (Mobile defense was also used in World War II.) Responsibilities were reassigned to implement the new tactics: front-line commanders took over reserves ordered into the battle and for flexibility, infantry platoons were subdivided into eight-man units under a noncom.

Field officers who visited headquarters often were invited to speak with Hindenburg, who inquired about their problems and recommendations. At this time he was especially curious about the eight-man units, which he regarded as "the greatest evidence of the confidence which we placed in the moral and mental powers of our army, down to its smallest unit." Revised Infantry Field Regulations were published and taught to all ranks, including at a school for division commanders, where they maneuvered a practice division. A monthly periodical informed artillery officers about new developments. In the last months of 1916, the British battering along the Somme produced fewer German casualties. Hindenburg recalled that the British offensive at the Somme "pressed us back to a depth of about six miles on a stretch of nearly twenty-five miles" Thirteen new divisions were subsequently created by reducing the number of men in infantry battalions, and divisions now had an artillery commander. Every regiment on the western front created an assault unit of stormtroopers selected from their fittest and most aggressive men. Lieutenant General Ernst von Höppner was given responsibility for both aerial and antiaircraft forces; the army's vulnerable Zeppelins went to the navy. Most cavalry regiments were dismounted and the artillery received their badly needed horses.

==== The Hindenburg program ====
Under Hindenburg, the Third OHL set ambitious benchmarks for arms production in what became known as the Hindenburg Programme, which was directed from the War Office by General Groener. Major goals included a new light machine gun, updated artillery, and motor transport, but no tanks because they considered them too vulnerable to artillery. To increase output, they needed skilled workers. The army released a million men. For total war, the Supreme Army Command wanted all German men and women from 15 to 60 enrolled for national service. Hindenburg also wanted the universities closed, except for medical training, so that empty places would not be filled by women. To swell the next generation of soldiers, he wanted contraceptives banned and bachelors taxed. When a Polish army was being formed, he wanted Jews excluded. Few of these ideas were adopted, however. Admiral Georg Alexander von Müller of the Military Cabinet observed, "Old Hindenburg, like Ludendorff, is no politician, and the latter is at the same time a hothead."

=== 1917 ===
==== Arms buildup and unrestricted submarine warfare ====
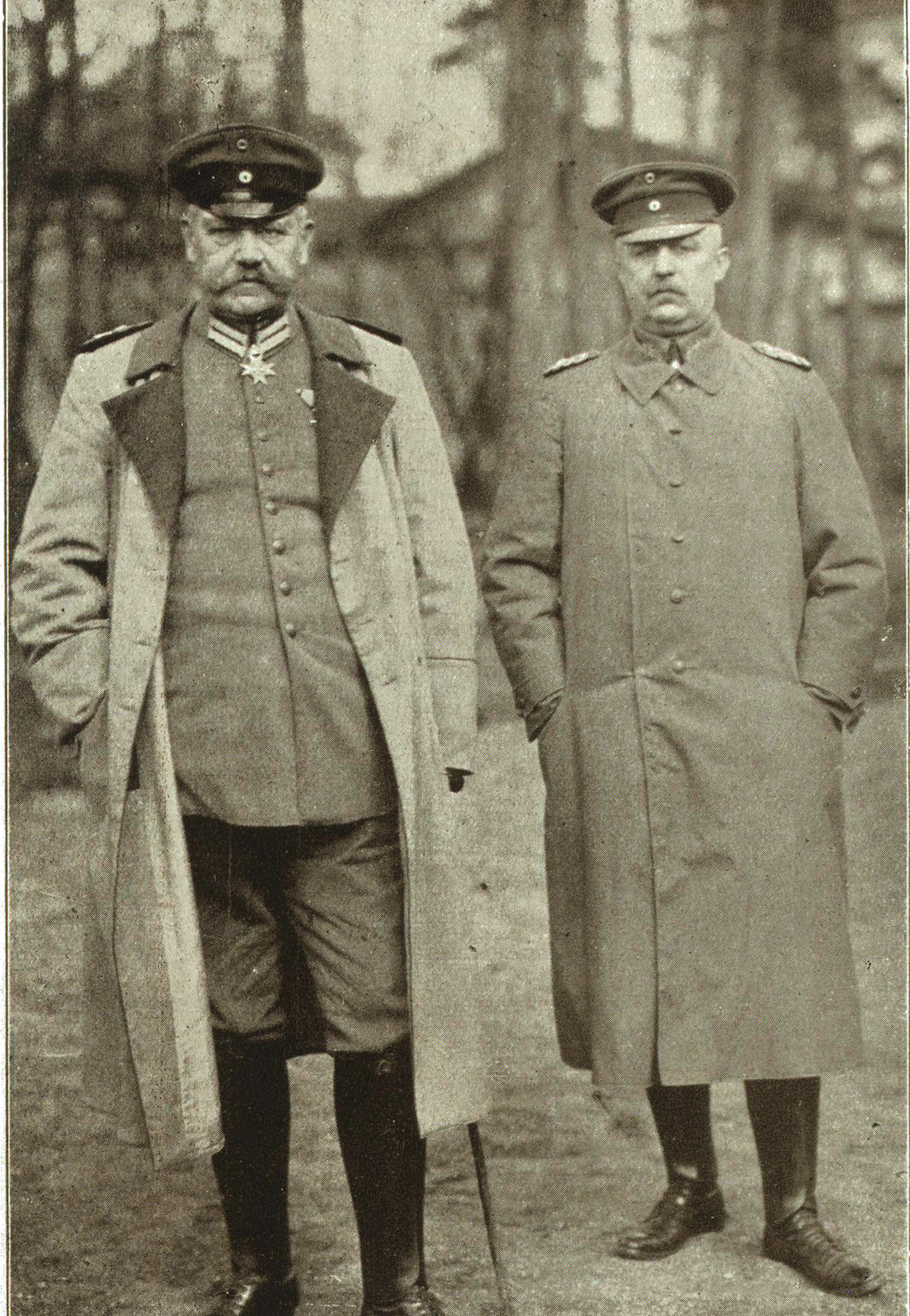
Field Marshal Hindenburg and Gen. Ludendorff in 1917. Their partnership formed the core of a dictatorship that dominated Germany for the rest of the war.

By the second quarter of 1917, Hindenburg and Ludendorff were able to assemble 680,000 more men in 53 new divisions and provide them with an adequate supply of new light machine guns. Field guns were increased from 5,300 to 6,700 and heavies from 3,700 to 4,340. They tried to foster fighting spirit by "patriotic instruction" with lectures and films to "ensure that a fight is kept up against all agitators, croakers and weaklings". Meanwhile, to mitigate the risk of being attacked before their buildup was complete, Germany's new military leadership waged unrestricted submarine warfare on allied shipping, which they claimed would defeat the British in six months. Chancellor Bethmann Hollweg and his allies expressed opposition to this policy, not wanting to bring the United States and other neutrals into the war. After securing the Dutch and Danish borders, Hindenburg announced that unrestricted submarine warfare was imperative and Ludendorff added his voice. On 9 January, the chancellor was forced to bow to their decisions.

==== The great withdrawal and defending the Western Front ====
On the Western Front, Hindenburg and the Third OHL deduced that the German Army's huge salient between the valley of the Somme and Laon obviously was vulnerable to a pincer attack, which indeed the French were planning. The new Hindenburg line ran across its base. Subsequently, on 16 March, Hindenburg authorized Operation Alberich whereby German forces were ordered to move out all able-bodied inhabitants and portable possessions to this line. In 39 days, the Germans withdrew from a 1000 mi^{2} (2,590 km^{2}) area, more ground than they had lost to all Allied offensives since 1914. The cautiously following Allies also had to cope with booby traps, some exploding a month later. The new German front called the Hindenburg line was 42 km (26 mi) shorter freeing up 14 German divisions.

On 9 April, the British attacked at Arras and overtook two German lines while occupying part of a third as the Canadians swept the Germans completely off the Vimy Ridge. When the excitable Ludendorff became distraught over such developments, Hindenburg reportedly calmed his First Quartermaster-General by "pressing his hand" and assuring him, "We have lived through more critical times than today together." Ultimately, the British tried to exploit their opening with a futile cavalry charge but did not press further. In the battle's aftermath, the Third OHL discovered one reason behind the British attack's success was that the Sixth Army commander, Ludwig von Falkenhausen, had failed to properly apply their instructions for a defense in depth by keeping reserve troops too far back from the front lines. As a result of this failure, Falkenhausen and several staff officers were stripped of their command.

==== The Eastern Front ====
After the Romanov dynasty's fall from power, Russia remained at war under the new revolutionary government led by Alexander Kerensky. In the Kerensky Offensive launched on 1 July, the Russian army pushed Austro-Hungarian forces in Galicia on 1 July. In order to counter this success, six German divisions mounted a counterattack on 18 July that tore a hole through the Russian front through which they sliced southward toward Tarnopol.

At the end of August, the advancing Central Powers stopped at the frontier of Moldavia. To keep up the pressure and to seize ground he intended to keep, Hindenburg shifted north to the heavily fortified city of Riga (today in Latvia), which has the broad Dvina River as a moat. On 1 September the Eighth Army, led by Oskar von Hutier, attacked; Bruchmüller's bombardment, which included gas and smoke shells, drove the defenders from the far bank east of the city, the Germans crossed in barges and then bridged the river, immediately pressing forward to the Baltic coast, pocketing the defenders of the Riga salient. Next, a joint operation with the navy seized Oesel and two smaller islands in the Gulf of Riga. The Bolshevik revolution took Russia out of the war, and an armistice was signed on 16 December.

==== The Reichstag peace resolution ====
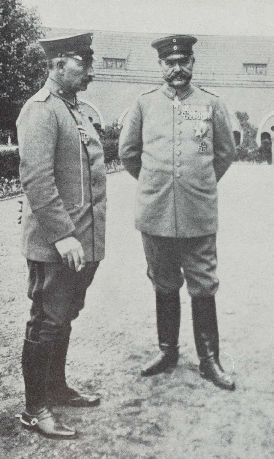
Kaiser Wilhelm II and Hindenburg

Hindenburg detested Chancellor Bethmann Hollweg for arguing against unrestricted submarine warfare. Then in July, the Reichstag debated a resolution for peace without "annexations or indemnities". Colonel Bauer and the Crown Prince hurried to Berlin to block the move. The Minister of War urged Hindenburg and Ludendorff to join them, but when they arrived, the Kaiser told them that "there could be no justification for their presence in Berlin". They should "return in haste to Headquarters where they certainly would be much better occupied." In a letter to the Emperor dated 12 July 1917, Ludendorff threatened to resign, and Hindenburg joined in the ultimatum. The Kaiser declined to accept. By then, the majority parties in the Reichstag saw Bethmann Hollweg as an unacceptable negotiator for peace because he had been chancellor too long and was too weak in his dealings with the Supreme Army Command. The crisis was resolved when Bethmann Hollweg voluntarily resigned. Ludendorff and Bauer wanted to replace both the Kaiser and the chancellor with a dictator, but Hindenburg would not agree. On 19 July, the Reichstag passed the resolution calling for a peace of understanding without "territorial acquisitions achieved by force and violations of political, economic or financial integrity", which the new chancellor, Georg Michaelis, agreed to "interpret". The policy of the peace resolution was therefore stillborn under Michaelis.

The resolution became advantageous in August when Pope Benedict XV called for peace. The German response cited the resolution to finesse specific questions like those about the future of Belgium. The industrialists opposed Groener's advocacy of an excess profits tax and insistence that workers take a part in company management. Groener made these proposals because he aimed for an increase in labour productivity (a goal he shared with Hindenburg and Ludendorff) but wanted to achieve this partially on the base of consent instead of coercion. However, Ludendorff relieved Groener by telegram and sent him off to command a division.

==== Victory in Italy ====
Bavarian mountain warfare expert von Dellmensingen was sent to assess the Austro-Hungarian defenses in Italy, which he found poor. Then he scouted for a site from which an attack could be mounted against the Italians. Hindenburg created a new Fourteenth Army with ten Austro-Hungarian and seven German divisions and enough airplanes to control the air, commanded by Otto von Below. The attackers slipped undetected into the mountains opposite to the opening of the Soča valley. The attack and ensuing Battle of Caporetto began during the night when the defender's trenches in the valley were abruptly shrouded in a dense cloud of poison gas released from 894 canisters fired simultaneously from simple mortars. The defenders fled before their masks would fail. The artillery opened fire several hours later, hitting the Italian reinforcements hastening up to fill the gap. The attackers swept over the almost empty defenses and marched through the pass, while mountain troops cleared the heights on either side.

Below's Army was dissolved and the German divisions returned to the Western Front, where in October Pétain had directed a successful limited objective attack in which six days of carefully planned bombardment left crater-free pathways for 68 tanks to lead the infantry forward on the Lassaux plateau south of Laon, which forced the Germans off of the entire ridge — the French Army had recovered.

==== Treaty of Brest-Litovsk ====
In the negotiations with Soviet Russia, Hindenburg wanted to retain control of all Russian territory that the Central Powers occupied, with German grand dukes ruling Courland and Lithuania, as well as a large slice of Poland. Their Polish plan was opposed by Foreign Minister Richard von Kühlmann, who encouraged the Kaiser to listen to the views of Max Hoffmann, chief of staff on the Eastern Front. Hoffmann demurred, but when ordered argued that it would be a mistake to bring so many Slavs into Germany, when only a small slice of Poland was needed to improve defenses. Ludendorff was outraged that the Kaiser had consulted a subordinate, while Hindenburg complained that the Kaiser "disregards our opinion in a matter of vital importance." The Kaiser backed off, but would not approve Ludendorff's order removing Hoffmann, who is not even mentioned in Hindenburg's memoir. When the Soviets refused the terms offered at Brest-Litovsk the Germans repudiated the armistice and in a week occupied the Baltic states, Belarus and Ukraine, which had signed the treaty as a separate entity. The Soviets subsequently signed the treaty. Hindenburg and Ludendorff demanded Kühlmann's dismissal after he advocated opening negotiations with the Entente.

=== 1918 ===
In January, more than half a million workers went on strike; among their demands was a peace without annexations. The strike collapsed when its leaders were arrested, the labor press was suppressed, strikers in the reserve were called to active duty, and seven great industrial concern taken under military control, which put their workers under martial law. On 16 January, Hindenburg demanded the replacement of Count von Valentini, the chief of the Civil Cabinet. The Kaiser bridled, responding "I do not need your parental advice", but nonetheless fired his old friend. The Germans were unable to tender a plausible peace offer because OHL insisted on controlling Belgium and retaining the French coalfields. All of the Central Powers' cities were on the brink of starvation and their armies were on short rations. Hindenburg realized that "empty stomachs prejudiced all higher impulses and tended to make men indifferent." He blamed his allies' hunger on poor organization and transportation, not realizing that the Germans would have enough to eat if they collected their harvest efficiently and rationed its distribution effectively.

==== Opting for a decision in the west ====
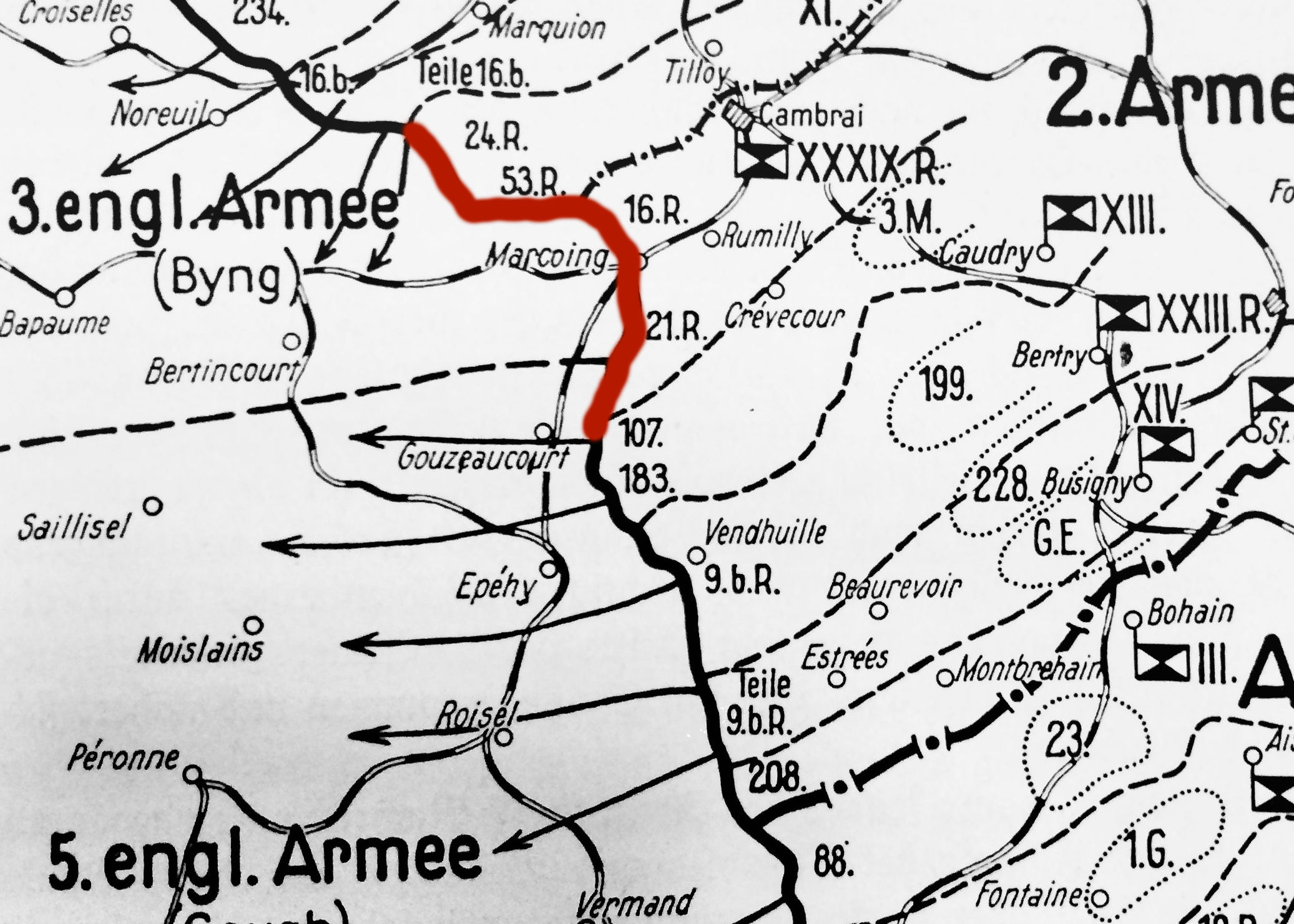
Map of the Michael offensive showing in red the section of the British front that was not assaulted frontally; its defenders were to be encircled by the attackers on their flanks.

German troops were in Finland, the Baltics, Poland, Belarus, Ukraine, much of Romania, the Crimea, and in a salient east of Ukraine extending east almost to the Volga and south into Georgia and Armenia. Hundreds of thousands of men were needed to hold and police these conquests. More Germans were in Macedonia and in Palestine, where the British were driving north; Falkenhayn was replaced by Otto Liman von Sanders, who had led the defense of Gallipoli. All Hindenburg required was that these fronts stand firm while the Germans won in the west, where now they outnumbered their opponents. He firmly believed that his opponents could be crushed by battlefield defeats regardless of their far superior resources.

Offensive tactics were tailored to the defense. Their opponents were adopting a defense in depth. He would attack the British because they were less skillful than the French. The crucial blow would be in Flanders, along the River Lys, where the line was held by the Portuguese Army. However, winter mud prevented action there until April. Consequently, their first attack, named Michael, was on the southern part of the British line, at a projecting British salient near Saint-Quentin. Schwerpunkte would hit on either side of the salient's apex to pocket its defenders, the V Corps, as an overwhelming display of German power.

Additional troops and skilled commanders, like General Oskar von Hutier, were shifted from the east. Army Group Gallwitz was formed in the west on 1 February. One quarter of the western divisions were designated for attack; to counter the elastic defense, during the winter, each of them attended a four-week course on infiltration tactics. Storm troops would slip through weak points in the front line and slice through the battle zone, bypassing strong points that would be mopped up by the mortars, flamethrowers, and manhandled field guns of the next wave. As always, surprise was essential, so the artillery was slipped into attack positions at night, relying on camouflage for concealment; the British aerial photographers were allowed free rein before D-day. There would be no preliminary registration fire; the gunners were trained for map firing in schools established by Bruchmüller. In the short, intense bombardment, each gun fired in a precise sequence, shifting back and forth between different targets, using many gas shells to keep defenders immersed in a toxic cloud. On D-day, the air force would establish air supremacy and strafe enemy strong points, and also update commanders on how far the attackers had penetrated. Signal lamps were used for messaging on the ground. Headquarters moved close to the front and, as soon as possible, would advance to pre-selected positions in newly occupied ground. OHL moved to Spa, Belgium while Hindenburg and Ludendorff were closer to the attack at Avesnes, France, which re-awakened his memories of occupied France 41 years before.

==== Breaking the trench stalemate ====
Operation Michael began on 21 March. The first day's reports were inconclusive, but by day two, the Germans knew they had broken through some of the enemy artillery lines. But the encirclement failed because British stoutness gave their V Corps time to slip out of the targeted salient. On day four, German forces moved on into the open country, and the Kaiser prematurely celebrated by awarding Hindenburg the Grand Cross of the Iron Cross, a medal first created for von Blücher. As usual, Hindenburg set objectives as the situation evolved. South of the salient, the Germans had almost destroyed the British Fifth Army, so they pushed west to cut between the French and British armies. However, they advanced too slowly through the broken terrain of the former Somme battlefields and the ground devastated when withdrawing the year before, and because troops stopped to loot food and clothing, the Allies maintained a fluid defensive line, manned by troops brought up and supplied by rail and motor transport. Hindenburg hoped the Germans would get close enough to Amiens to bombard the railways with heavy artillery, but they were stopped just short, after having advanced a maximum of 65 km (40 mi). Hindenburg also hoped that civilian morale would crumble, because Paris was being shelled by naval guns mounted on rail carriages 120 km (75 mi) away, but he underestimated French resilience.

The Allied command was dismayed. French headquarters realized: "This much became clear from the terrible adventure, that our enemies were masters of a new method of warfare [...] What was even more serious was that it was perceived that the enemy's power was due to a thing that cannot be improvised, the training of officers and men."

Prolonging Michael with the drive west, delayed and weakened the attack in Flanders. Again, the Germans broke through, smashing the Portuguese defenders and forcing the British from all of the ground they had paid so dearly for in 1917. However, French support enabled the British to save Hazebrouck, the rail junction that was the German goal. To draw the French reserves away from Flanders, the next attack was along the Aisne River where Nivelle had attacked the year before. Their success was dazzling. The defender's front was immersed in a gas cloud fired from simple mortars. Within hours the Germans had reoccupied all the ground the French had taken by weeks of grinding, and they swept south through Champagne until they halted for resupply at the Marne River.

However, the Germans had lost 977,555 of their best men between March and the end of July, while Allied ranks were swelling with Americans. Their dwindling stock of horses was on the verge of starvation, and the ragged troops thought continually of food. One of the most effective propaganda handbills, which the British showered on the German lines, listed the rations received by prisoners of war. The German troops resented their officers' better rations and reports of the ample meals at headquarters; in his memoirs, Ludendorff devotes six pages to defending officers' rations and perks. After an attack, the survivors needed at least six weeks to recuperate, but now crack divisions were recommitted much sooner. Tens of thousands of men were skulking behind the lines. Determined to win, Hindenburg decided to expand the salient pointing toward Paris to strip more defenders from Flanders. The attack on Gouraud's French Fourth Army followed the now familiar scenario, but was met by a deceptive elastic defense and was decisively repelled at the French main line of resistance. Hindenburg still intended to make a decisive attack in Flanders, but before the Germans could strike, the French and Americans, led by light tanks, smashed through the right flank of the German salient on the Marne. The German defense was halfhearted; they had lost. Hindenburg went on the defensive. The Germans withdrew one by one from the salients created by their victories, evacuating the wounded and supplies, and retiring to shortened lines. Hindenburg hoped to hold a line until their enemies were ready to bargain.

==== Ludendorff's breakdown ====
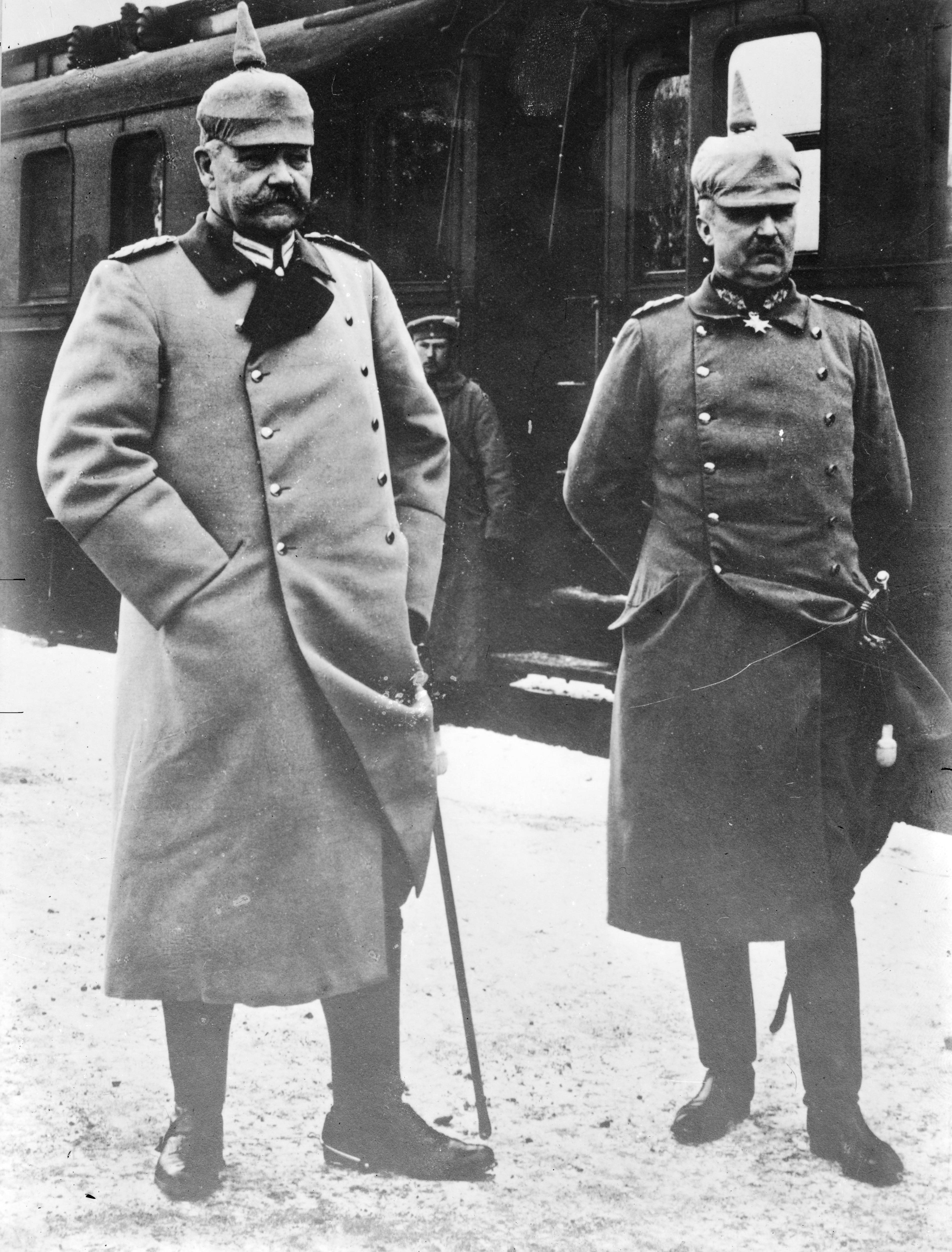
Hindenburg and Ludendorff in 1918

After the retreat from the Marne, Ludendorff became distraught, shrieking orders and often in tears. At dinner on 19 July, he responded to a suggestion of Hindenburg's by shouting, "I have already told you that is impossible" – Hindenburg led him from the room. On 8 August, the British completely surprised the Germans with a well-coordinated attack at Amiens, breaking well into the German lines. Most disquieting was that some German commanders surrendered their units and that reserves arriving at the front were taunted for prolonging the war. For Ludendorff, Amiens was the "black day in the history of the German Army." Bauer and others wanted Ludendorff replaced, but Hindenburg stuck by his friend; he knew that "Many a time has the soldier's calling exhausted strong characters." A sympathetic physician who was Ludendorff's friend persuaded him to leave headquarters temporarily to recuperate. (His breakdown is not mentioned in Hindenburg's or his own memoirs.) On 12 August, Army Group von Boehn was created to firm up the defenses in the Somme sector. On 29 September, Hindenburg and Ludendorff told the incredulous Kaiser that the war was lost and that they must have an immediate armistice.

==== Defeat and revolution ====
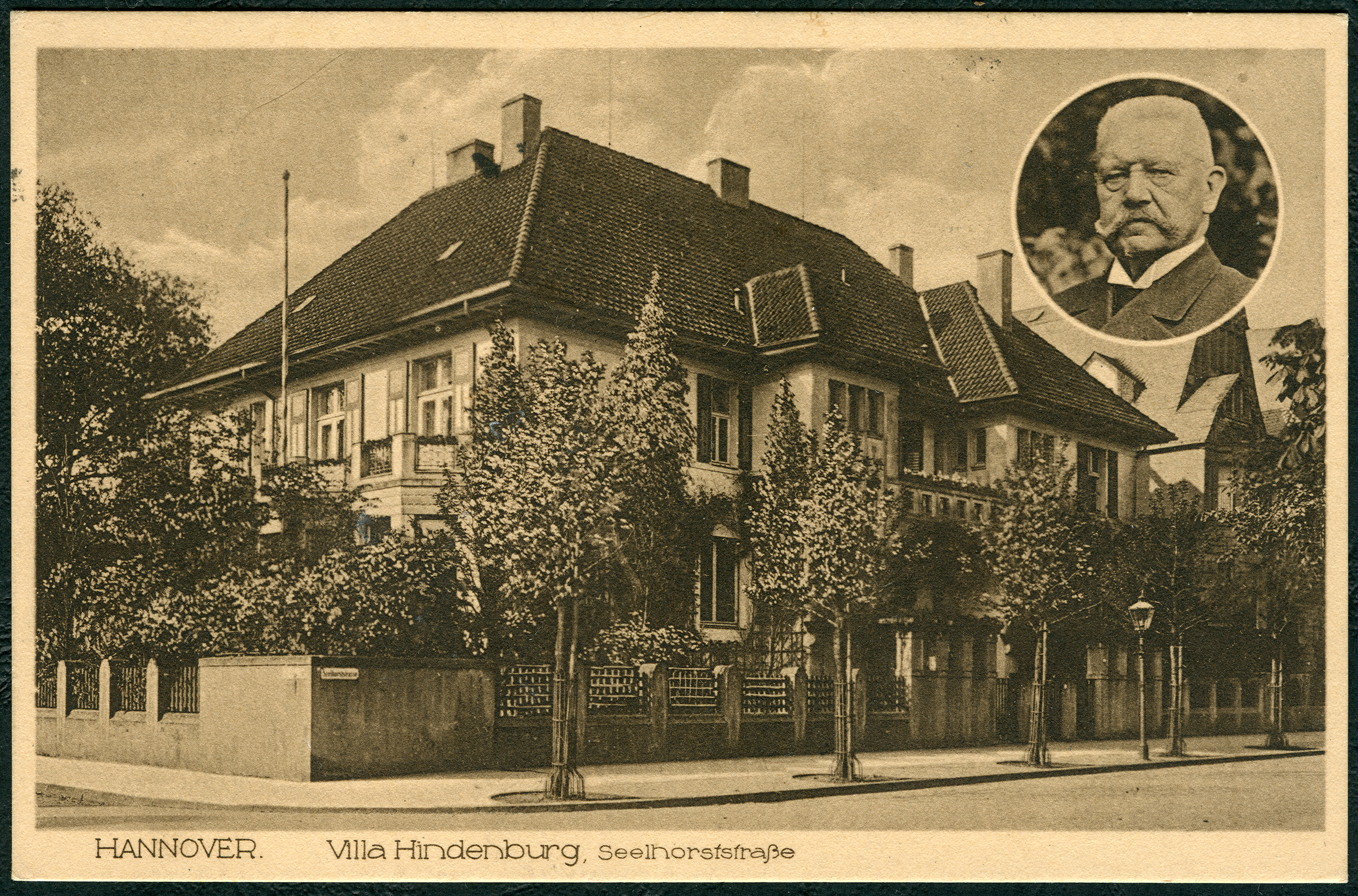
The Hindenburg villa in Hanover

A new chancellor, Prince Maximilian of Baden, opened negotiations with President Woodrow Wilson, who would deal only with a democratic Germany. Prince Max told the Kaiser that he would resign unless Ludendorff was dismissed, but that Hindenburg was indispensable to hold the army together. On 26 October, the Kaiser reprimanded Ludendorff before curtly accepting his resignation — then rejecting Hindenburg's. Afterwards, Ludendorff refused to share Hindenburg's limousine. Colonel Bauer was retired. Hindenburg promptly replaced Ludendorff with Wilhelm Groener.

The Germans were losing their allies. In June, the Austro-Hungarians in Italy attacked the Entente lines along the Piave River but were repelled decisively. On 24 October, the Italians crossed the river in the Battle of Vittorio Veneto. After a few days of resolute resistance, the defense collapsed, weakened by the defection of men from the empire's subject nations and by starvation: the men in their Sixth Army had an average weight of 120 lb (54 kg). On 14 October, Austria-Hungary asked for an armistice in Italy, but the fighting went on. In September, the Entente and their Greek allies attacked in Macedonia. The Bulgarians begged for more Germans to stiffen their troops, but Hindenburg had none to spare. Many Bulgarian soldiers deserted as they retreated toward home, opening the road to Constantinople. The Austro-Hungarians were pushed back in Serbia, Albania and Montenegro, and signed an armistice on 3 November. The Ottomans were overextended, trying to defend Syria while exploiting the Russian collapse to move into the Caucasus, despite Hindenburg's urging them to defend what they had. The British and Arabs broke through in September, capturing Damascus. The Armistice of Mudros was signed on 30 October.

Woodrow Wilson's 23 October diplomatic note to Germany had indirectly called for the Kaiser's abdication when it stated that the United States would negotiate only with representatives of the German people, not the monarchy. Wilhelm, determined to lead the Army home in the event of disturbances in Berlin, refused to abdicate. A week later, Admiral Franz von Hipper and Admiral Reinhard Scheer without authorization made plans to dispatch the Imperial Fleet on a last battle against the British. Sailors in Kiel mutinied and set up workers' and soldiers' councils that spread quickly across Germany, sparking the German revolution of 1918–1919. On 8 November, Hindenburg and the Kaiser met with 39 regimental officers at Spa. There he delivered a situation report and answered questions. Then Hindenburg left and Groener asked the officers to answer confidentially two questions about whether their troops would follow the Kaiser. The answers were decisive: the army would not. The Kaiser then agreed to abdicate without doing so at the time. In Berlin, however, Prince Max had already publicly announced the Kaiser's abdication and his own resignation, and that the Social Democrat leader Friedrich Ebert was the new chancellor. The Empire had crumbled all but bloodlessly. That evening Groener telephoned Ebert, whom he knew and trusted, and promised to support the new government, including with military force against revolutionaries on the left. In return, Ebert promised that command of the troops would stay with the officer corps. Hindenburg remained head of the OHL to ensure an orderly return of the army.

The withdrawal became more fraught when the armistice obliged all German troops to leave Belgium, France, and Alsace-Lorraine in 14 days and to be behind the Rhine in 30 days. Stragglers would become prisoners. When the seven men from the executive committee of the soldiers' council formed at Spa arrived at OHL they were greeted politely by a lieutenant colonel, who acknowledged their leadership. When they broached the march home, he took them to the map room, explaining allocation of roads, scheduling unit departures, billeting, and feeding. They agreed that the existing staff should make these arrangements. To oversee the withdrawals OHL transferred headquarters from Belgium to Kassel in Germany, unsure how their officers would be received by the revolutionaries. They were greeted by the chairman of the workers' and soldiers' councils, who proclaimed, "Hindenburg belongs to the German nation." His staff intended to billet him in the Kaiser's palace there, Wilhelmshöhe. Hindenburg refused because they did not have the Kaiser's permission, instead settling into a humble inn, thereby pleasing both his monarchist staff and the revolutionary masses. In the west, 1.25 million men and 500,000 horses were brought home in the time allotted.

Hindenburg did not want to involve the Army in the defense of the new government against their civil enemies. Instead, the Army supported the independent Freikorps (modeled on formations used in the Napoleonic wars), supplying them with weapons and equipment. In February 1919, OHL moved east to Kolberg to mount an offensive against impinging Soviet troops, but they were restrained by the Allied occupation administration, which in May 1919 ordered all German troops in the east home. On 25 June 1919, Hindenburg retired to Hanover once again. He settled in a splendid new villa, which was a gift of the city, despite his admittedly having "lost the greatest war in history".

=== Military reputation ===
"Victory comes from movement" was Schlieffen's principle for war. Hindenburg expounded on Schlieffen's ideas as an instructor and later applied them during World War I. By employing such tactics, retreats and mobile defenses commanded by Hindenburg proved effective, and his Schwerpunkt attacks broke through the trench barrier on the Western Front. However, they failed to produce decisive victories because penetrating forces proved too slow to capitalize on their breakthroughs.

Hindenburg has undergone a historical re-evaluation: his teaching of tactics and years on the General Staff have been less emphasised while he is remembered as a commander in Ludendorff's shadow. Winston Churchill in 1923, depicted Hindenburg as a figurehead awed by the mystique of the General Staff, concluding that "Ludendorff throughout appears as the uncontested master." Parkinson stated that he is a "beloved figurehead", while to Stallings he is "an old military booby". These judgements stem from Ludendorff, who was famous during the war and immediately thereafter wrote his comprehensive memoir with himself center stage. Hindenburg's less detailed memoir never disputed his colleague's claims, military decisions were made collectively not individually, and it is less useful to historians because it was written for general readers. Ludendorff continued emphasising his preeminence in print, which Hindenburg never disputed publicly.

Others did, though: the OHL officers who testified before the Reichstag committee investigating the collapse of 1918 agreed that Hindenburg was always in command. He managed by setting objectives and appointing capable people to do their jobs, for instance, "giving full scope to the intellectual powers" of General Ludendorff. These subordinates often felt he did little, even though he was setting the overall course. According to Admiral von Müller, Ludendorff may have overrated himself, considering his repeated showings that he lacked the resilience essential to command. Postwar, he displayed poor judgment and an attraction to unusual ideas, contrasting with his superior officer's adaptation to changing times.

Hindenburg's record as a commander starting in the field at Tannenberg, then leading four national armies, culminating with breaking the trench deadlock in the west, and then holding a defeated army together, is unmatched by other soldiers in World War I. However, military skill is only one component of the record: "[...] in general, the maladroit politics of Hindenburg and Ludendorff led directly to the collapse of 1918 [...]"

== In the Republic ==
Germany had not been allowed to take part in the negotiations that produced the Treaty of Versailles and received the terms as an accomplished fact on 7 May 1919. When in June the Weimar National Assembly, Germany's interim parliament, had still not accepted the treaty without demanding alterations, the Allies issued an ultimatum which included the threat of an invasion. Through General Groener, President Ebert asked Hindenburg whether the army was prepared to defend against an Allied invasion, which Ebert thought would be all but certain if the treaty were voted down. He promised to urge rejection of the treaty if there was even the slightest chance that the army could hold out. Under some prodding from Groener, Hindenburg concluded that the army could not resume the war under any circumstances, concluding with the statement, "[...] as a soldier, I cannot help feeling that it would be better to perish honorably than accept a disgraceful peace". On 23 June, with just 19 minutes to spare, Ebert informed French Premier Georges Clemenceau that Germany would ratify the treaty. It was signed on 28 June 1919.

=== Second retirement ===
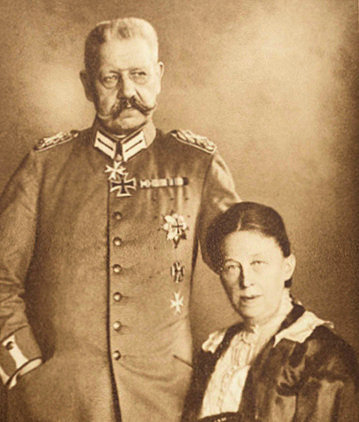
Paul and Gertrud von Hindenburg, January 1917

Back in Hanover, as a field marshal, he was provided with a staff that helped with his still extensive correspondence. He made a few formal public appearances, but the streets around his house were often crowded with admirers when he took his afternoon walk. During the war, he had left the newspaper reporters to Ludendorff; in retirement, he was available. He hunted locally and elsewhere, including an annual chamois hunt in Bavaria. The yearly Tannenberg memorial celebration kept him in the public eye.

A Berlin publisher urged him to produce his memoirs, which could educate and inspire by emphasizing his ethical and spiritual values. His story and ideas could be put on paper by a team of anonymous collaborators and the book would be translated immediately for the worldwide market. Aus meinem Leben ("From My Life") was a huge bestseller, presenting to the world his carefully crafted image as a staunch, steadfast, uncomplicated soldier. Major themes were the need for Germany to maintain a strong military as the school teaching young German men moral values and the need to restore the monarchy, because only under the leadership of the House of Hohenzollern could Germany become great again, with "the conviction that the subordination of the individual to the good of the community was not only a necessity, but a positive blessing [...]". The Kaiser was treated throughout with great respect. Hindenburg concealed his cultural interests and assured his readers: "It was against my inclination to take any interest in current politics." (This was in spite of what his intimates knew of his "deep knowledge of Prussian political life".) Aus meinem Leben was dismissed by many military historians and critics as a boring apologia that skipped over the controversial issues, but it painted for the German public precisely the image he sought.

In 1919, Hindenburg was subpoenaed to appear before the parliamentary commission investigating the responsibility for the outbreak of war in 1914 and for the defeat in 1918. He was wary, as he had written: "The only existing idol of the nation, undeservedly my humble self, runs the risk of being torn from its pedestal once it becomes the target of criticism." Ludendorff was also summoned. They had been strangers since Ludendorff's dismissal, but they prepared and arrived together on 18 November 1919. Hindenburg refused to take the oath until Ludendorff was permitted to read a statement that they were under no obligation to testify since their answers might expose them to criminal prosecution, but they were waiving their right of refusal. On the stand, Hindenburg read through a prepared statement, ignoring the chairman's repeated demands that he answer questions. He testified that the German Army had been on the verge of winning the war in the autumn of 1918 and that the defeat had been precipitated by a stab in the back from disloyal elements on the home front and unpatriotic politicians, quoting a dinner conversation that Ludendorff had had with Sir Neill Malcolm. When his reading was finished, Hindenburg walked out of the hearings despite being threatened with contempt, sure that they would not dare charge a war hero. His testimony gave additional weight to the stab-in-the-back myth, which was being adopted by nationalist and conservative politicians who sought to blame the socialist founders of the Weimar Republic for losing the war. Reviews in the German press that seriously misrepresented General Frederick Maurice's 1919 book about the last months of the war had been used by Ludendorff to convince Hindenburg that it was true. A 1929 film glorifying his life as a dedicated patriot solidified his image.

Germany's first presidential election was constitutionally required to take place after the election for the first Reichstag, which was held on 6 June 1920. Hindenburg wrote to Wilhelm II, in exile in the Netherlands, for permission to run. Wilhelm approved, and on 8 March Hindenburg announced his intention to seek the presidency. The Reichstag, however, repeatedly postponed the presidential election due to internal unrest and in October 1922 extended Ebert's term of office until 30 June 1925. Hindenburg cut back on public appearances.

His serenity was shattered by the illness of his wife Gertrud, who died of cancer on 14 May 1921. He kept close to his three children, their spouses and his nine grandchildren. His son Oskar was at his side as the field marshal's liaison officer. Hindenburg was financially sustained by a fund set up by a group of admiring industrialists.

On 8 November 1923, Adolf Hitler, with Ludendorff at his side, launched the Beer Hall Putsch in Munich, which was suppressed by the Bavarian police. Hindenburg was not involved but inevitably was prominent in newspaper reports and issued a statement urging national unity. At Tannenberg in August 1924, before a crowd of 50,000, Hindenburg laid the cornerstone for an imposing memorial at the site of the battle he had won in 1914.

== Presidency (1925-1934) ==
=== 1925 presidential election ===
President Ebert died on 28 February 1925. In the first round of the election to replace him, none of the candidates attained the required majority. For the second round, the Social Democrats, Catholic Centre Party and other democratic parties united to support the Centre's Wilhelm Marx. The Communist Party ran their own candidate, Ernst Thälmann. The parties on the right established a committee to select their strongest candidate. After a week's indecision, they decided on Hindenburg, despite his advanced age and the fear, notably in Foreign Minister Gustav Stresemann, of unfavorable reactions by their former enemies. A delegation came to his home on 1 April. He stated his reservations but concluded, "If you feel that my election is necessary for the sake of the Fatherland, I'll run, in God's name." Since some parties on the right still opposed him, he drafted a telegram declining the nomination, but before it was sent, Admiral Alfred von Tirpitz arrived in Hanover to persuade him to wait until the strength of his support was clearer. After his conservative opponents gave way, he consented on 9 April. Again, he obtained Wilhelm II's approval. His campaign stressed his devotion to "social justice, religious equality, genuine peace at home and abroad". He addressed only one public meeting, held in Hanover, and gave one radio address, on 11 April, calling for a "national community" (Volksgemeinschaft) under his leadership. The second round required only a plurality to win, which Hindenburg obtained thanks to the support of the Bavarian People's Party (BVP), which had switched from Marx, and by the refusal of the Communists to withdraw their candidate. In most of the world, including Great Britain, the victory of the aged field marshal was accepted with relative equanimity, although there was a greater degree of apprehension in France.

=== Parliamentary governments ===
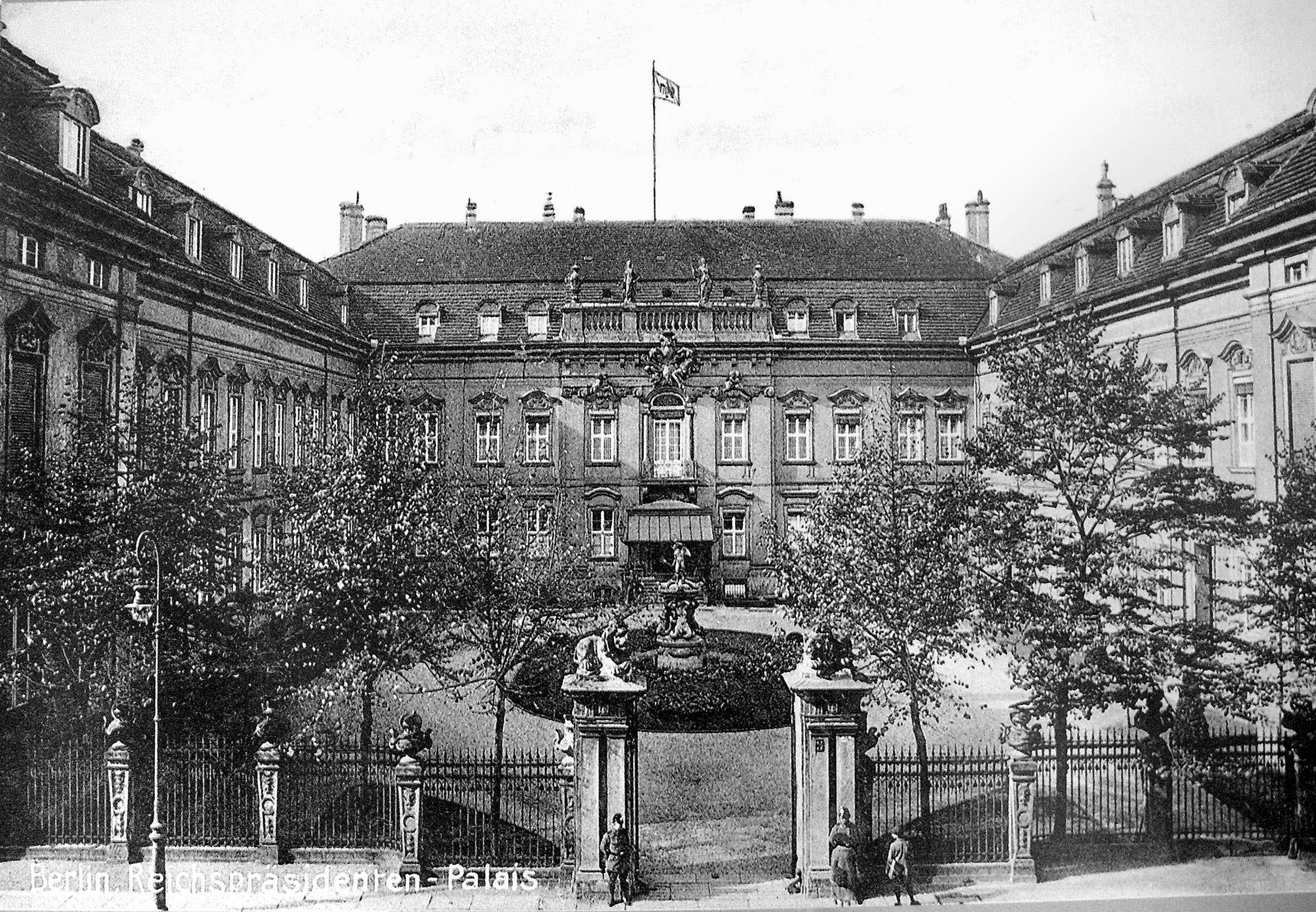
The presidential palace (the building at the back)

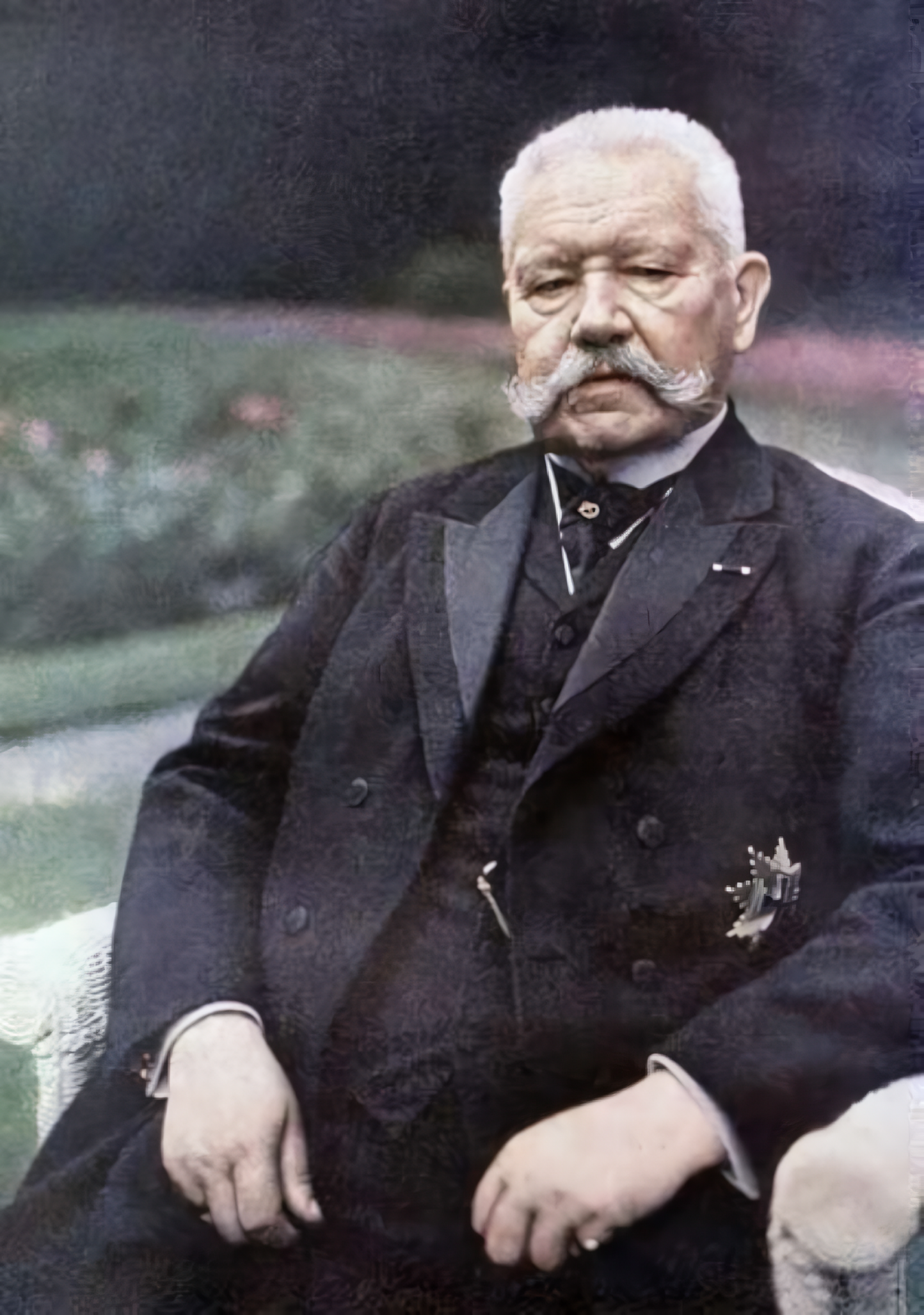
Autochrome photograph of Hindenburg, October 1927

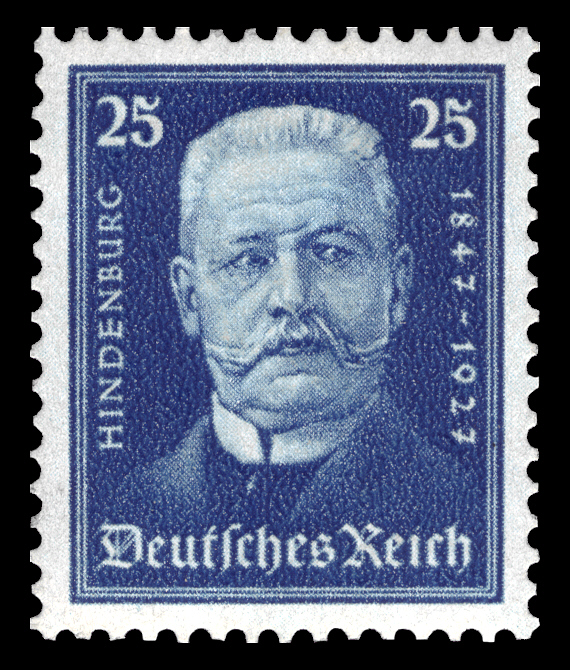
A Hindenburg stamp released in 1927 on the occasion of his 80th birthday

Hindenburg took office on 12 May 1925 "[...] offering [his] hand in this hour to every German". He moved into the elegant Presidential Palace on the Wilhelmstrasse, accompanied by his son Oskar (his military liaison officer) and Oskar's wife and their three children. The new president, always a stickler about uniforms, soon had the servants wearing new regalia with the shoe buckles appropriate for a court. Nearby was the Reich chancellery, which during Hindenburg's tenure would have seven residents. He notified Chancellor Hans Luther that he would replace the head of Ebert's presidential staff, Dr. Otto Meissner, with his own choice, but Meissner was kept on and was Hindenburg's right-hand man throughout his presidency.

At his first meeting with Foreign Minister Stresemann, Hindenburg listened attentively and was persuaded that Stresemann's strategy of promoting friendly relations with the victors was correct. He was cooler at their next, reacting to backlash from the right. He nonetheless gave his support to the government's policy, and on 1 December 1925, the Locarno Treaties were signed. By agreeing to guarantee its post-war borders on the west, Germany took a significant step in restoring its position in Europe, although the German right was infuriated because the treaties accepted the loss of Alsace–Lorraine. Hindenburg countered their demands to restore the monarchy by arguing that the return of a Hohenzollern would block progress in revising Versailles. He accepted the Republic as the mechanism for restoring Germany's position in Europe, although he was no Vernunftrepublikaner (republican by reason), since democracy was incompatible with the militaristic national community that would unite the people of Germany for future conflicts.

After the Luther government resigned over the signing of the Locarno Treaties, Hindenburg worked actively with the parties in the Reichstag to form a new coalition, an effort which took five weeks. The second Luther cabinet lasted just under four months and was followed by the return of Wilhelm Marx of the Centre Party as chancellor. Stresemann stayed on as foreign minister in both cabinets.

A major issue during Marx's chancellorship was whether the properties of the former rulers of the German states, including the Hohenzollerns, should be expropriated without compensation. Hindenburg felt that he could not speak out on the issue as president and talked of resigning so that he could express his opposition. He nevertheless did not object when a private letter was made public in which he described the proposed referendum on the issue as a "grave injustice" that showed a "deplorable lack of sense of tradition" and "gross ingratitude". The majority of those who voted in the referendum on expropriation favored the measure, but their numbers did not reach the voter participation threshold for it to pass. Hindenburg then urged the states, again under the threat of resigning, to reach fair settlements promptly, which for the most part they did.

The next crisis came in the autumn of 1926 when the chief of the army command, Hans von Seeckt, without first seeking government approval, invited Prince Wilhelm, the grandson of the former emperor, to attend army manoeuvres in uniform. It created a storm when the republican press publicised the transgression. Reichswehr Minister Otto Gessler told Hindenburg that Seeckt had to resign or he himself would. Since Gessler was supported by the cabinet, Hindenburg asked for Seeckt's resignation. In a painful final interview, Hindenburg emphasised that Seeckt had to go to keep the government from resigning, not because of his invitation to the Prince. Seeckt's successor was Wilhelm Heye.

Marx's government resigned after it was revealed that the Reichswehr, in violation of the Treaty of Versailles, was cooperating with the Red Army in producing poison gas and building a military aircraft factory in Soviet Russia. The German Nationals (DNVP) agreed to join a revamped Marx cabinet, and a new government was in place on 31 January 1927. It legislated an overtime law and introduced unemployment insurance.

On 18 September 1927, Hindenburg spoke at the dedication of the massive memorial at Tannenberg, outraging international opinion by denying Germany's responsibility for starting World War I as indicated in Article 231 of the Treaty of Versailles. He declared that Germany had entered the war as "the means of self-assertion against a world full of enemies. Pure in heart, we set off to the defence of the Fatherland and with clean hands, the German army carried the sword." The Allied governments retaliated by not congratulating him on his eightieth birthday, although he was more upset by Ludendorff's refusal to have any contact at the ceremony. Most Germans did celebrate his birthday: his present was Neudeck, the ancestral East Prussian estate of the Hindenburgs, purchased with funds from a public subscription. Later, it became known, or at least suspected, that the title was in Oskar's name to avoid a potential inheritance tax.

The Marx cabinet collapsed in February 1928. Hindenburg pressed it to promptly pass the required legislation and then dissolved the Reichstag on 31 March 1928. His leadership during the crisis was widely applauded. The Reichstag election on 20 May 1928 produced a shift to the left, although a handful of Nazis were elected as well. Hermann Müller of the SPD, whom Hindenburg found clever and agreeable, was appointed the new chancellor. Hindenburg later told Groener that Müller was his best chancellor.

The next crisis followed Stresemann's negotiation in 1929 of the Young Plan, which rescheduled reparations payments and opened the way for needed American loans. The right formed a committee to block adoption, which started by intensively lobbying Hindenburg using such powerful voices as that of Admiral Tirpitz. Hindenburg did not budge from his refusal to support the campaign. The committee brought mainstream conservatives, such as the powerful newspaper owner Alfred Hugenberg, into alliance with the Nazis for the first time. Hugenberg called Hindenburg senile because of his opposition to the measure and claimed that he was a tool of the left and had no will of his own. The committee submitted the issue to a national plebiscite, which failed because only 15% of eligible voters cast a ballot, far short of the 50% required.

=== Presidential governments ===
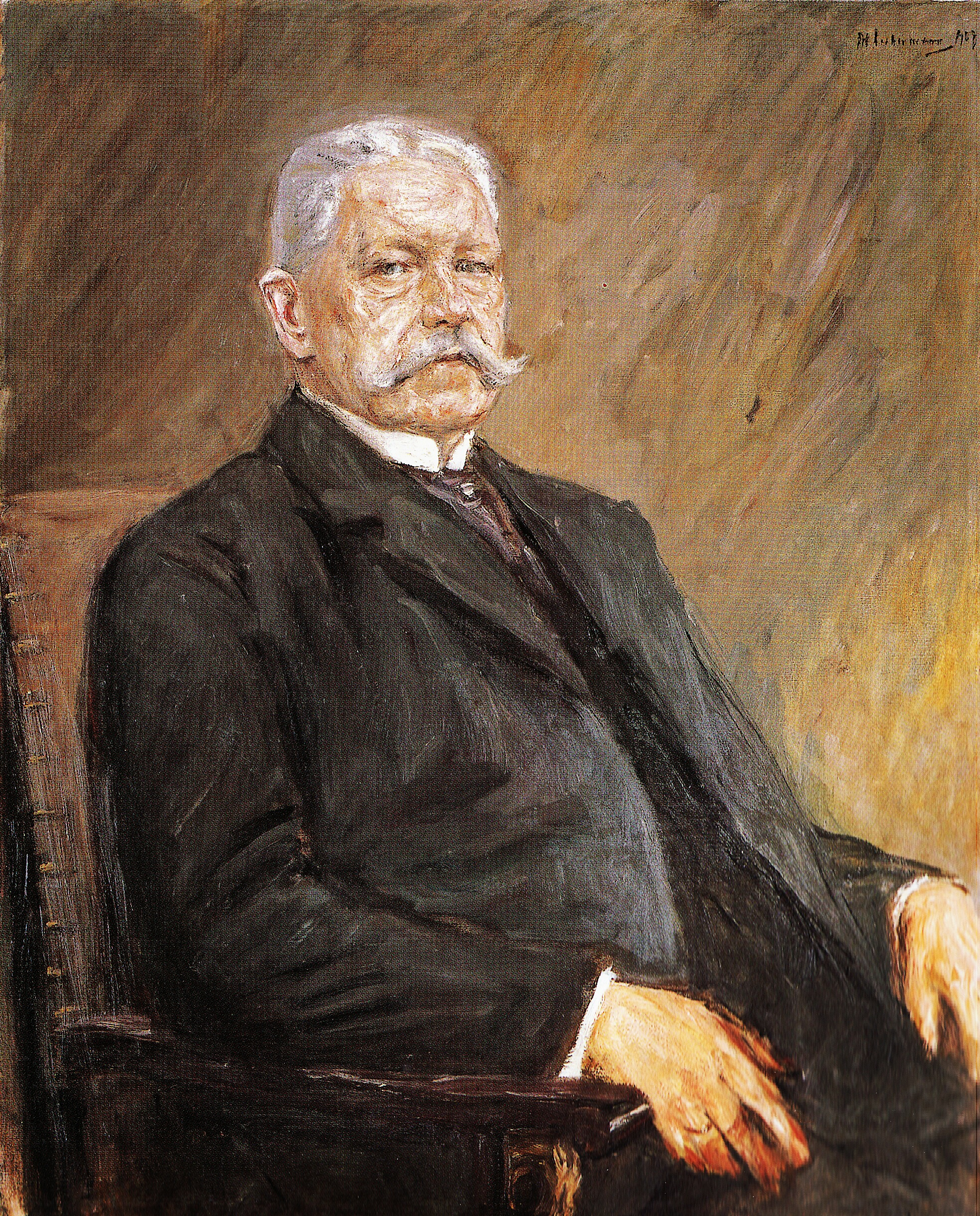
President Hindenburg as painted by Max Liebermann

In early 1930, the Müller government became embroiled in a dispute over how to pay for the rapidly rising costs of unemployment insurance. Müller asked Hindenburg to have his budget passed by presidential decree, which was allowed by Article 48 of the constitution, but Kurt von Schleicher persuaded Hindenburg to refuse. Schleicher had for some time been planning a government in which the chancellor would be responsible to the president rather than the Reichstag. He thought that in such a presidential government, the trained economist and leader of the Centre Party, Heinrich Brüning, would make an excellent chancellor and sounded him out on his willingness to take on the position under such terms. Müller's government fell on 27 March 1930, and Hindenburg appointed Brüning chancellor. Brüning had hesitated because he lacked parliamentary support, but Hindenburg appealed to his sense of duty and threatened to resign if Brüning did not accept. Only the four Social Democrats in the previous cabinet were replaced, resulting in what the press labeled the "Hindenburg Cabinet". The German historian Eberhard Jäckel concluded that presidential government was within the letter of the constitution but violated its spirit. Article 54 stated that the chancellor and his cabinet were responsible to the Reichstag, which made presidential government an end run around the constitution.

Faced with declining tax revenues and mounting costs for unemployment insurance, Brüning introduced a deflationary austerity budget with major spending cuts and steep tax increases. After his budget was defeated in the Reichstag in July 1930, Hindenburg signed it into law by invoking Article 48. The Reichstag voted to repeal the budget bill, so Hindenburg dissolved it just two years into its mandate and re-approved the budget using Article 48.

In the September 1930 election, the Nazis achieved an electoral breakthrough, gaining 18 percent of the vote to become the second strongest party in the Reichstag. The Communists made gains as well, moving up to third place with 13%. The SPD remained the strongest with 25% of the vote. After the election, Brüning continued to govern largely through Article 48. His government was kept afloat by the Social Democrats, who voted against canceling his Article 48 bills in order to avoid another election that could only benefit the Nazis and the Communists.

Hindenburg met Adolf Hitler for the first time in October 1931 at a high-level conference in Berlin. Everyone present saw that they took an immediate dislike to one another. Afterwards, Hindenburg privately often referred to Hitler as "that Austrian corporal", "that Bohemian corporal" or sometimes simply as "the corporal". He also ridiculed Hitler's Austrian accent. Hitler for his part called Hindenburg "that old fool" or "that old reactionary" in private conversations.

In foreign affairs Hindenburg spoke with hostility about Poland, often expressing a hope that it would disappear from the map of Europe "at an appropriate moment".

=== Second presidency ===
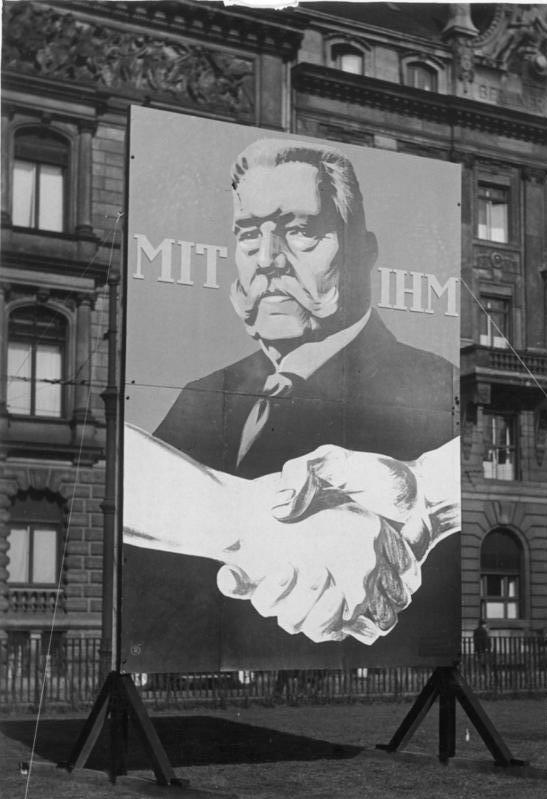
Election poster for Hindenburg in 1932 (translation: "With him")

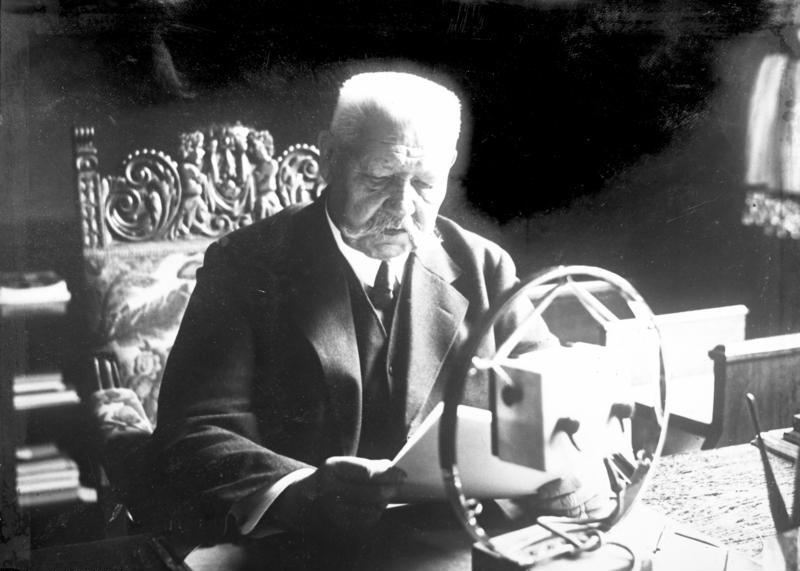
Hindenburg, aged 84, at a radio microphone in 1932 during the election campaign in which he defeated Hitler.

By January 1932, at the age of 84, Hindenburg was vacillating about running for a second term. Brüning recalled that once the president came to meet him at the railway station, but failed to recognise him. On the other hand, Franz von Papen, a later chancellor, found that despite minor lapses with his short-term memory, the president remained competent until his last days. Hindenburg was persuaded to run by the Kamarilla (his son Oskar, Groener, Meissner and Schleicher), and supported by the Centre Party, the Deutsche Volkspartei (DVP) and the Social Democratic Party of Germany (SPD), which regarded him as the only hope of defeating Hitler. His fighting spirit was evoked by Nazi taunts when he appeared in public and in a few weeks, three million Germans signed a petition urging him to carry on. Brüning proposed to the Reichstag that in light of the still-escalating economic disaster — now some of the largest banks had failed — the election should be postponed for two years, which would have required a two-thirds assent, to which the Nazis would never agree. Hitler was to be one of his opponents in the election. Hindenburg left most campaigning to others; in his single radio address, he stressed the need for unity. "I recall the spirit of 1914, and the mood at the front, which asked about the man, and not about his class or party." Hitler campaigned vigorously throughout Germany in the first round of voting and the runoff.

In the first round of voting in March 1932, Hindenburg was the front-runner, but failed to gain the required majority. In the runoff the following month, Hindenburg won with 53% of the vote. However, he was disappointed because he lost voters from the right, only winning by the support of those who had strongly opposed him seven years before. He wrote, "Despite all the blows in the neck I have taken, I will not abandon my efforts for a healthy move to the Right". He called in the party leaders for advice. During the meetings, Meissner led the discussions while Hindenburg would only speak briefly on crucial points. Schleicher took the lead in choosing the cabinet, in which he was Reichswehr Minister. Groener was now even more unpopular to the right because he had banned wearing party uniforms in public. On 13 May 1932, Schleicher told Groener that he had "lost the confidence of the Army" and must resign at once. Once Groener was gone, the ban was lifted and the Nazi brownshirts were back battling on the streets.

To cope with mounting unemployment, Brüning desperately wanted an emergency decree to launch a program in which bankrupt estates would be carved up into small farms and turned over to unemployed settlers. When they met, Hindenburg read a statement that there would be no further decrees and insisted that the cabinet resign and that there must be a turn to the right. Brüning resigned on 1 June 1932. He was succeeded as chancellor by Papen from the Centre Party, who was Schleicher's choice; Hindenburg did not even ask the party leaders for advice. He was delighted with Papen, a rich, smooth aristocrat who had been a famous equestrian and a general staff officer; he soon became a Hindenburg family friend (Schleicher was no longer welcomed because he had quarreled with Oskar). The president was delighted to find that eight members of the new cabinet had served as officers during the war.

The Social Democratic government of the State of Prussia was a caretaker, because it had lost its mandate in the preceding election. In his new role as chancellor, Papen accused it of failing to maintain public order, and removed it as the Prussian government on 20 July in what came to be known as the Prussian coup d'état. The national elections came eleven days later. Eight parties received substantial numbers of votes, but those supporting the government lost strength, while opponents on the right and left gained. The Nazis polled almost the same 37% they had in the presidential election, making them the largest party in the Reichstag. Schleicher negotiated with them, proposing that Hitler become vice-chancellor. Hitler demanded the chancellorship along with five cabinet positions and important posts in the state governments; additionally, the Reichstag would have to pass an Enabling act giving a new government all needed powers, otherwise it would be dissolved. Around the country, Nazi stormtroopers were running riot, attacking their political opponents. Hindenburg refused to make Hitler the chancellor, so he met with Hitler to explain that he was unwilling to bring a single party to power, concluding with "I want to extend my hand to you as a fellow soldier." The following morning, he left for Neudeck; most of the newspapers praised his defense of the constitution. The constitution mandated a new election within sixty days, but owing to the crisis, Hindenburg postponed it. Papen published an economic recovery plan that almost all of the parties and the labor unions lambasted. His scant support crumbled further.

To add enough votes to gain a parliamentary mandate, Schleicher tried to persuade some of the Nazi leaders, like the war hero Hermann Göring, to defect and to take a position in his government. None of them would, so he became another presidential chancellor, still courting prominent Nazis — otherwise his days as chancellor were numbered. Papen continued to negotiate with Hitler, who moderated his conditions: he would settle for the chancellorship, the Reich Commissioner of Prussia and two cabinet positions: interior and a new slot for aviation. He also promised that he would respect the rights of the president, the Reichstag and the press, and Papen would be vice-chancellor. On these terms, Hindenburg allowed Oskar and Meissner to meet secretly with Hitler, culminating in an hour's tête-à-tête between Hitler and Oskar. Schleicher learned of the secret meeting and the following morning met with the president to demand emergency powers and the dissolution of the Reichstag. Hindenburg refused the powers but agreed to the election. Before a new government could be formed, Hindenburg called General Werner von Blomberg, an opponent of Schleicher, back from a disarmament conference and appointed him Reichswehr minister, perhaps unaware that he was a Nazi sympathizer.

=== Chancellorship of Adolf Hitler ===
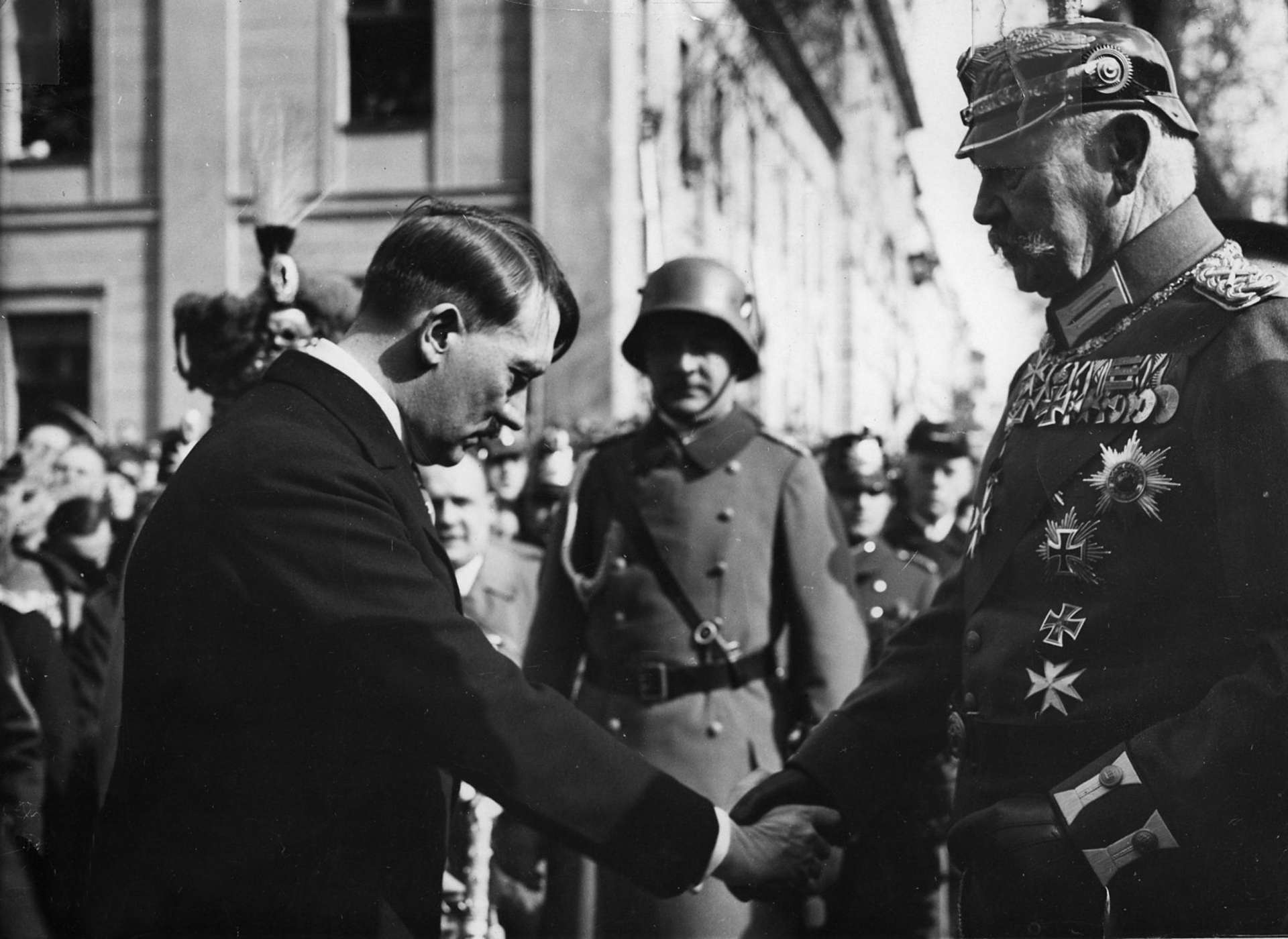
Hitler and Hindenburg at the opening ceremony for the 1933 Reichstag at the Garrison Church in Potsdam, 21 March 1933

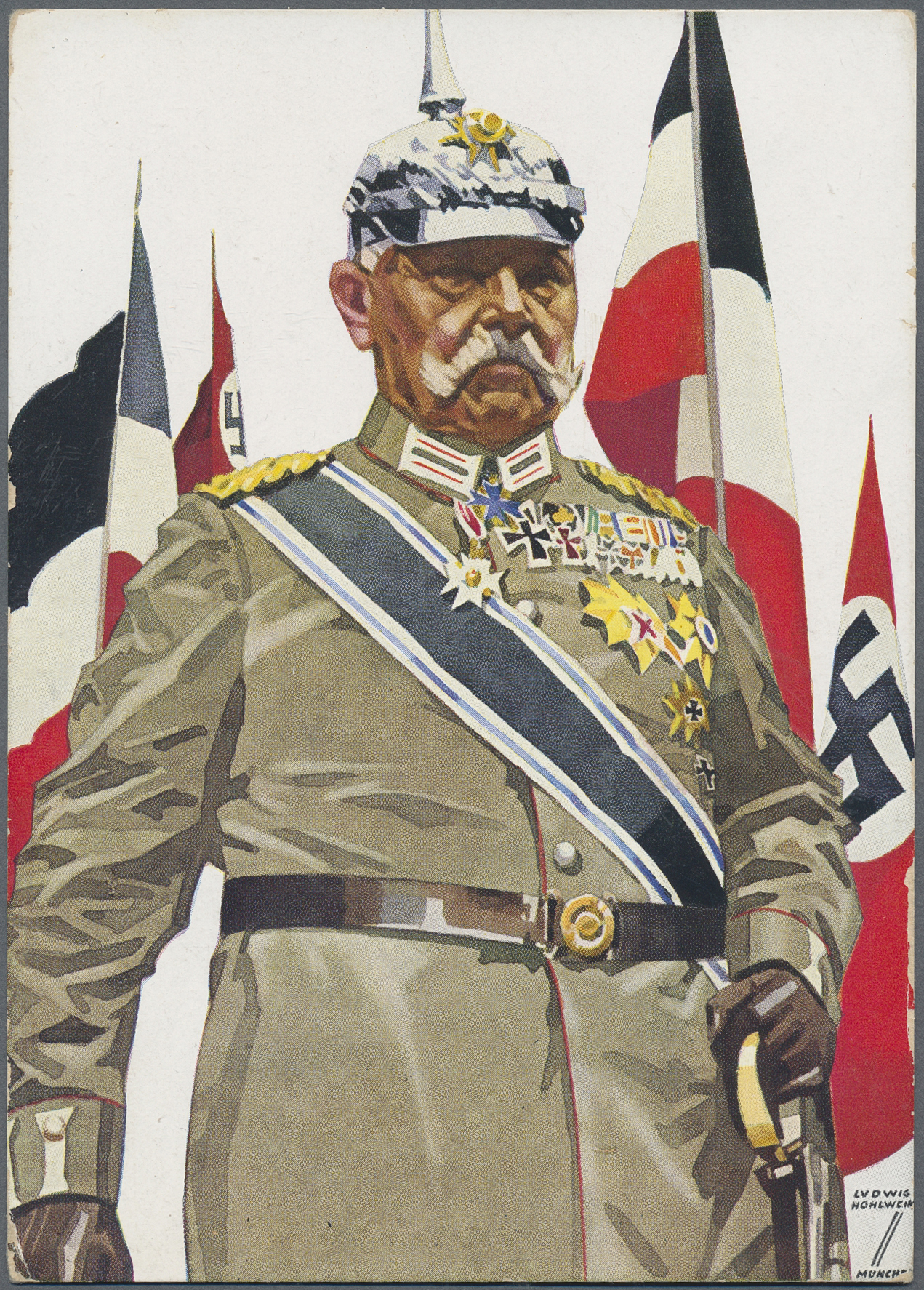
Hindenburg by Ludwig Hohlwein, with Nazi flag, c. 1934

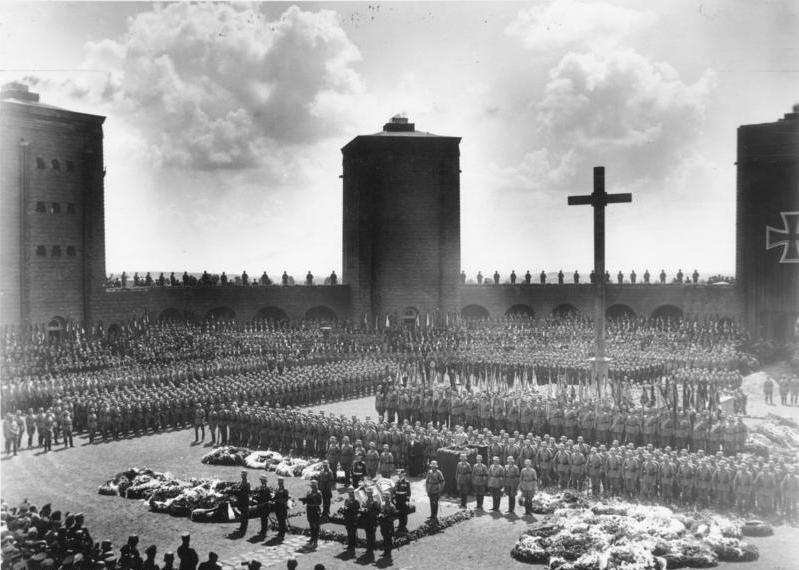
The Tannenberg Memorial where Hindenburg and his wife were buried

In January 1933, to break the stalemate, Hindenburg proposed Hitler as chancellor, Papen as vice-chancellor and Reich commissioner of Prussia, and Göring as Prussian interior minister (who controlled the police). Two other cabinet ministers would be Nazis; the remaining eight would be from other parties. When Hindenburg met with Hitler, Papen would always be present. The new cabinet included three Nazis: Hitler, Göring and Wilhelm Frick. Besides Hitler, Frick was the only Nazi with a portfolio; he held the nearly powerless Interior Ministry (unlike the rest of Europe, the Interior Ministry had no power over the police, which was the responsibility of the Länder). Göring did not receive a portfolio, but critically was made Prussian interior minister, controlling the largest police force. Blomberg was Reichswehr minister, Hugenberg was economics and agriculture minister, and Seldte was labor minister. Other ministers were holdovers from the Papen and Schleicher cabinets. Hitler was made chancellor on 30 January 1933.

Hitler's first act as chancellor was to ask Hindenburg to dissolve the Reichstag, so the Nazis and Deutschnationale Volkspartei ("German Nationalists" or DNVP) could win a majority to pass the Enabling Act of 1933 that would give the government power to rule by decree, supposedly for the next four years. Unlike laws passed by Article 48, which could be cancelled by a majority in the Reichstag, under the Enabling Act, the chancellor could pass laws by decree that could not be cancelled by a vote. Hindenburg agreed. In early February 1933, Papen asked for and received an Article 48 bill signed into law that limited freedom of the press. After the Reichstag fire on 27 February, Hindenburg, at Hitler's urging, signed into law the Reichstag Fire Decree via Article 48, which suspended civil liberties. Göring, as Prussian Interior Minister, had enlisted thousands of Sturmabteilung (SA) men as auxiliary policemen, who attacked political opponents of the Nazis, with Communists and Social Democrats being singled out for particular abuse. Fritz Schäffer, a conservative Catholic and a leading politician of the Bavarian People's Party met Hindenburg on 17 February 1933 to complain about the campaign of terror against the SPD. Schäffer told Hindenburg:

We reject the notion that millions of Germans are not to be designated as national. The socialists served in the trenches and will serve in the trenches again. They voted for the banner of Hindenburg [...] I know many socialists who have earned acclaim for their service to Germany; I need only mention the name of Ebert.

Hindenburg, who hated the Social Democrats, rejected Schäffer's appeal, saying that the SPD were "traitors" who had "stabbed the Fatherland in the back" in 1918, and who could never belong to the volksgemeinschaft. Therefore, the Nazis had his support in their campaign against the Social Democrats.

Hindenburg disliked Hitler, but approved of his efforts to create the Volksgemeinschaft. For Hindenburg, the "Government of National Concentration" headed by Hitler was the fulfillment of what he had sought since 1914, the creation of the Volksgemeinschaft. Despite the ensuing anti-red hysteria, in the March 1933 federal election, the Nazis received only 44% of the vote, though with the support of the DNVP they had a majority in the Reichstag.

Hitler soon obtained Hindenburg's confidence, promising that after Germany regained full sovereignty, the monarchy would be restored; after a few weeks, Hindenburg no longer asked Papen to join their meetings. The opening of the new Reichstag was celebrated with a Nazi extravaganza: Hindenburg descended into the crypt of the old garrison church in Potsdam to commune with the spirit of Frederick the Great at his grave, attended by Hitler, who saluted the president as "the custodian of the new rise of our people." An Enabling Act was prepared that transferred law-making from the Reichstag to the government, even if the new laws violated the constitution. With the Communist deputies and many Social Democrats kept out of the chamber, in violation of the constitution, the Reichstag passed the act with more than the needed two-thirds majority, effectively ending the Republic.

During 1933 and 1934, Hitler was aware that Hindenburg was the only check on his power. With the passage of the Enabling Act and the banning of all parties except the Nazis, Hindenburg's power to sack the chancellor was the only means by which Hitler could be legally removed from office. Given Hindenburg was still a popular war hero and revered figure in the Reichswehr, there was little doubt the Reichswehr would side with Hindenburg if he decided to sack Hitler. Thus, as long as Hindenburg was alive, Hitler was very careful to avoid offending him or the German Army. Although Hindenburg was in increasingly bad health, the Nazis ensured that whenever Hindenburg appeared in public, it was in Hitler's company. During these appearances, Hitler made a point of showing him the utmost respect and deference.

In the fall of 1933, a group of Hindenburg's friends, led by General August von Cramon, asked Hindenburg to restore the monarchy. Hindenburg replied:

Of course, I recognize your fidelity to our Kaiser, King and Lord without reservation. But precisely because I share this sentiment, I must urgently warn against the step you plan to take [...] The domestic crisis is not yet completely over, and foreign powers will have a hard time imagining me on the sidelines if it comes to a restoration of the monarchy [...] To say this is unbelievably painful for me.

Economic austerity was abandoned as Hitler poured money into new programs hiring the unemployed, buying armaments, and building infrastructure. Within a year, unemployment fell by almost 40%. Hitler gained the support of the armed forces by promising to rebuild their strength. The German states were taken over by the national government, labor unions suppressed, political opponents imprisoned, and Jews were ejected from the civil service, which included the universities. Hindenburg only objected to the treatment of Jews; he wanted war veterans retained, to which Hitler acceded. When Hitler moved to eject Hugenberg from the cabinet and suppress the political parties, a trusted colleague of Hugenberg's was sent to Neudeck to appeal for assistance, but only met with Oskar. Hindenburg delayed the appointment of one Nazi Gauleiter, but failed to obtain the installation of a Lutheran bishop he favored. The honor guard at Neudeck now was storm troopers. On 27 August, at the ceremonies at Tannenberg, the president was presented with two large East Prussian properties near Neudeck. On the night before the plebiscite on Nazi rule scheduled for 11 November 1933, Hindenburg appealed to the voters to support their president and chancellor, 95% of those voting did so. When a new commander of the army was to be appointed, the president's choice won out over the chancellor's, but Hindenburg accepted a change in the military oath that eliminated obedience to the president and placed the swastika on military uniforms.

By summer 1934, Hindenburg was dying of metastasized bladder cancer and his correspondence was dominated by complaints of Nazi stormtroopers running amok. Hindenburg grew alarmed at Nazi excesses. With his support, Papen gave a speech at the University of Marburg on 17 June, calling for an end to Nazi state terror and the restoration of some freedoms. When Propaganda Minister Joseph Goebbels got wind of it, he not only canceled a scheduled tape-delayed broadcast of the speech, but ordered the seizure of newspapers in which part of the text was printed.

Papen was furious, telling Hitler that he was acting as a "trustee" of Hindenburg, and a "junior minister" like Goebbels had no right to silence him. He resigned and notified Hindenburg about what had happened. Hindenburg was outraged and told Blomberg to give Hitler an ultimatum — unless Hitler took steps to end the growing tension in Germany and the SA, Hindenburg would declare martial law and turn the government over to the army. In response, Hitler carried out a purge known as the Night of the Long Knives, during 30 June to 2 July 1934 in which several SA's leaders were arrested and/or murdered, for which he purportedly received Hindenburg's thanks in a telegram. A day later, Hindenburg learned by a telegram that Schleicher and his wife had been gunned down in their home. During the Nuremberg Trials, Göring admitted the telegram was never seen by Hindenburg and was written by the Nazis.

== Death ==
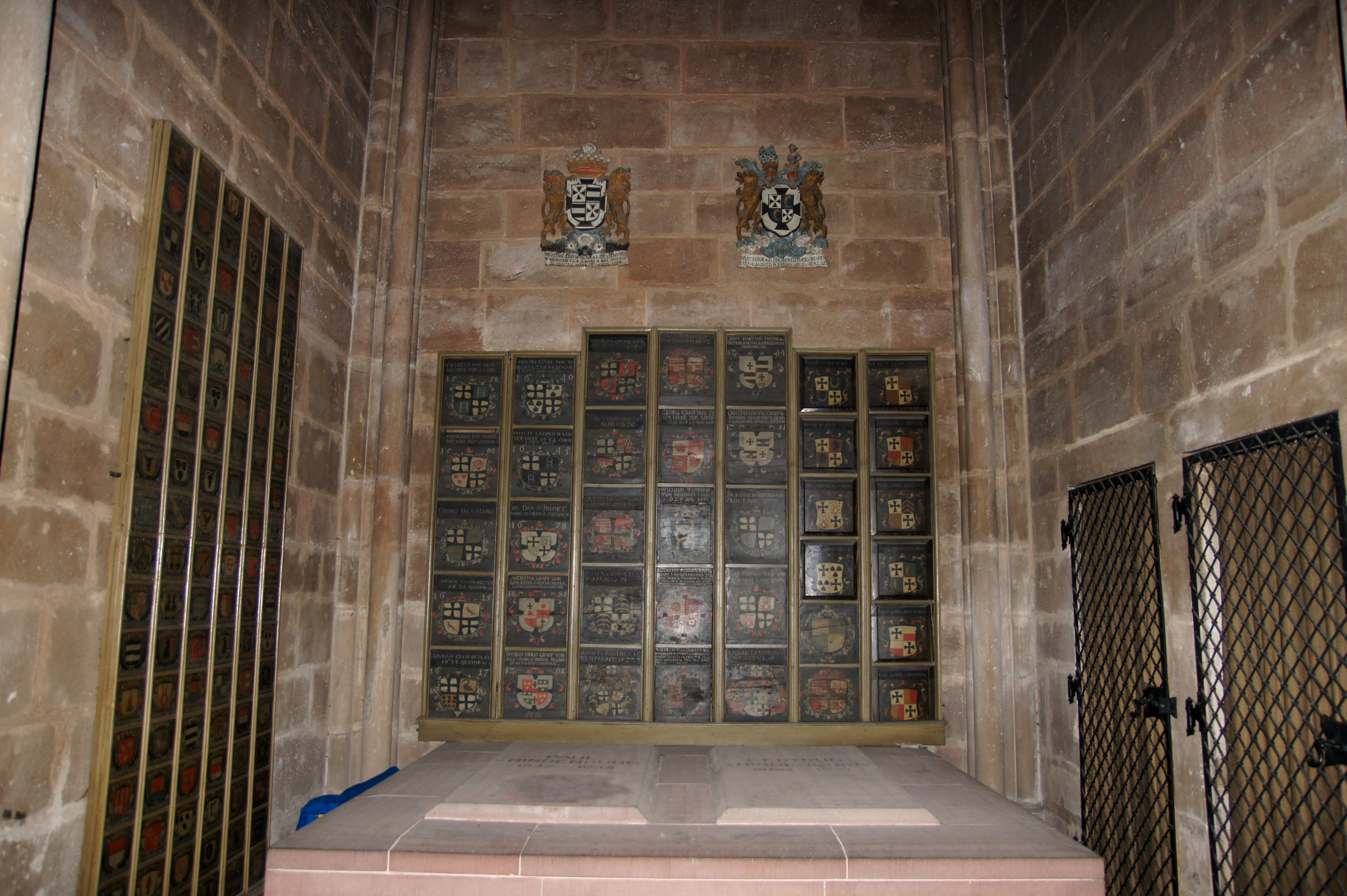
Grave of Hindenburg

Hindenburg remained in office until his death at the age of 86 from cancer which had spread to his lungs, at his home in Neudeck (today, Ogrodzieniec, Warmian-Masurian Voivodeship), East Prussia, on 2 August 1934. The day before, Hitler received word that Hindenburg was on his deathbed. He then had the cabinet pass the "Law Concerning the Head of State of the German Reich," which stipulated that upon Hindenburg's death, the office of president would be abolished and its powers merged with those of the chancellor under the title of Führer und Reichskanzler (Leader and Chancellor of the Reich).

Three hours after Hindenburg's death, it was announced that as a result of this law, Hitler was now both Germany's head of state and head of government, thereby eliminating the last remedy by which he could be legally dismissed and cementing his status as the absolute dictator of Germany. Publicly, Hitler announced that the presidency was "inseparably united" with Hindenburg, and it would not be appropriate for the title to ever be used again.

In truth, Hitler had known as early as April 1934 that Hindenburg would likely not survive the year. He worked feverishly to get the armed forces — the only group in Germany that would be nearly powerful enough to remove him with Hindenburg dead — to support his bid to become head of state after Hindenburg's death. In a meeting aboard the Deutschland on 11 April with Blomberg, army commander Werner von Fritsch and naval commander Erich Raeder, Hitler publicly proposed that he himself succeed Hindenburg. In return for the armed forces' support, he agreed to suppress the SA and promised that the armed forces would be the only bearers of arms in Germany under his watch. Raeder agreed right away, but Fritsch withheld his support until 16 May, when the senior generals unanimously agreed to back Hitler as Hindenburg's successor.

According to Günther von Tschirschky und Bögendorff, an interwar German diplomat and associate of Hindenburg who later defected to the United Kingdom, President Paul von Hindenburg's last will and testament had criticised the Nazis and supported democracy. The defector said that it had also argued for the establishment of a constitutional monarchy with clear separation of powers, along with the abolition of all forms of racial and religious discrimination. He alleged that the document had been handed over to Hitler by Hindenburg's Nazi-supporting son. A few days after his death, the Nazis released their own version of Hindenburg's final "political testament", which was complimentary of Hitler.

Hitler had a plebiscite held on 19 August 1934, in which the German people were asked if they approved of Hitler taking the office of Führer. The Ja (Yes) vote amounted to 90% of the vote. This referendum, as well as all efforts to make Hitler Hindenburg's successor, violated the Enabling Act. Although it gave Hitler the right to pass laws that were contrary to the constitution, it stated that the president's powers were to remain "undisturbed", which has long been interpreted to forbid any attempt to tamper with the presidency. The constitution had also previously been amended in 1932 to make the president of the High Court of Justice, not the chancellor, first in the line of succession to the presidency and even then only on an interim basis until fresh elections.

Contrary to Hindenburg's will, he was interred with his wife in a magnificent ceremony at the Tannenberg Memorial. In 1944, as the Soviets approached, Generalleutnant Oskar von Hindenburg moved his parents' remains to western Germany. In January 1945, German troops blew up the memorial. In 1949, Polish authorities razed the site, leaving few traces. His remains were temporarily interred in Thuringia along with the remains of Frederick the Great, Frederick William I, the standards of the Imperial German Army from 1914 to 1918, the files of the Foreign Office, artworks from Prussian state museums, the library of Sanssouci and the Prussian crown jewels. By April 1945, the Monuments, Fine Arts, and Archives Section of the United States Army uncovered the remains and transported them to Marburg, where they were interred in St. Elizabeth's Church in Marburg, where they remain to this day. A plaque on his grave only commemorates the victims of war and violence, without mentioning Hindenburg's name.

== Legacy ==
=== Personality traits ===
On a visit to Hindenburg's headquarters, Crown Prince Wilhelm described the mood as family-like. He reportedly had a good sense of humor and often made jokes at his own expense. He also had a prodigious memory for names and faces, asking colleagues about their sons in the army, even recalling their ranks and units.

Despite this bonhomie, Hindenburg kept his own counsel. According to Kaiser Wilhelm II, "Hindenburg never said more than half of what he really thought". When professor Hugo Vogel, commissioned to immortalise the victorious Tannenberg commanders in paint, arrived at headquarters most of his subjects begrudged posing. Hindenburg visited most days, often staying for hours, which his staff attributed to ego, having no inkling that he and his wife collected paintings of the Virgin nor that he was an amateur artist nor that he liked to discuss books — Schiller was his favorite author. After a painting was completed, Hindenburg would periodically check on how many printed reproductions had been sold. Vogel was with him throughout the war and did his last portrait in 1934. Protecting his warrior image, Hindenburg wrote in his memoir that "the artists were a distraction [with which] we would have preferred to dispense".

=== Analysis of political career and cultural impact ===
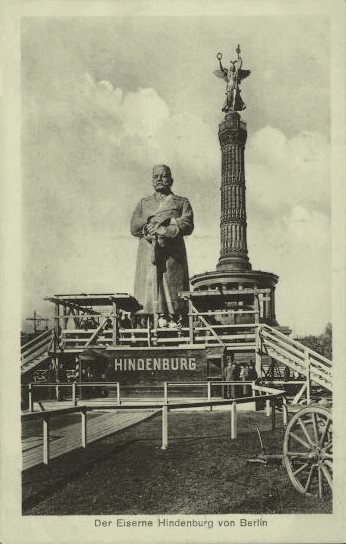
Postcard of the wooden statue of Hindenburg erected in Berlin for the first anniversary of Tannenberg

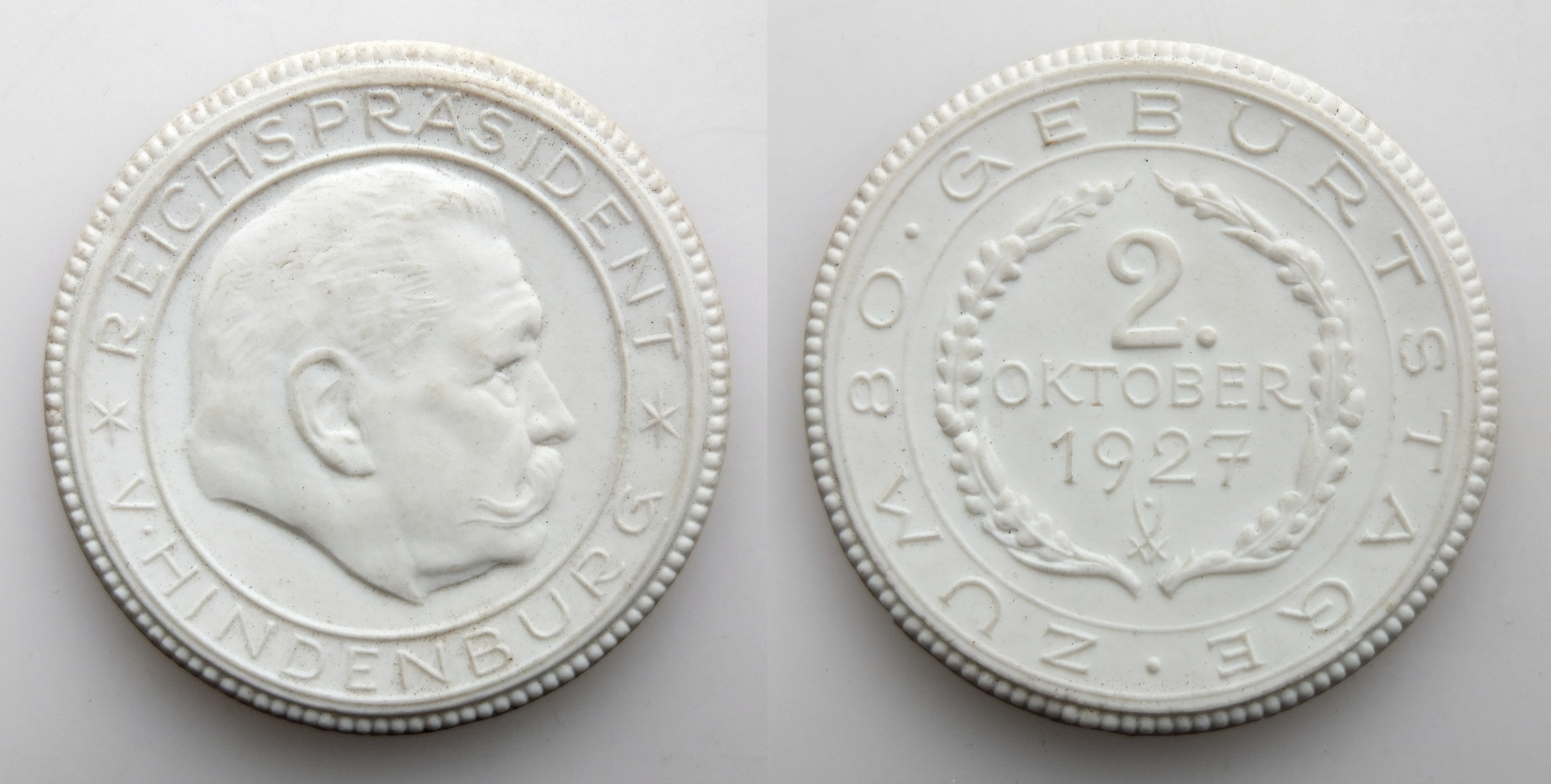
Porcelain medal in honour of Hindenburg's 80th birthday on 2 October 1927, produced by Staatliche Porzellan-Manufaktur Meissen

After overseeing Germany's crushing victory at Tannenberg, Paul von Hindenburg became the center of a massive personality cult that persisted throughout his life. Henceforth, he was lauded as the living ideal of German masculinity and patriotism. According to historian Anna Menge:

The intensity, longevity, striking political and social breadth, and political deployment of the adulation for Hindenburg — in short, the power of the Hindenburg myth from 1914 until 1934 and beyond — was a political phenomenon of the first order [...] The Hindenburg myth was one of the central narratives in German public discourse during the World War I, the Weimar Republic, and the early years of Nazi rule. The striking polyvalence of the narrative — it extolled not only right-wing notions of authoritarian leadership but also more bi-partisan national values, such as salvaging something positive from war and defeat and self-affirmation in the face of crisis — meant that Hindenburg's myth could be deployed by different groups, at different times, and for different purposes. Although promoted first and foremost by German nationalists, especially in Weimar's early years, some elements of the Hindenburg myth had considerable cross-party appeal. That his initiation as a mythical figure rested on national defence and a battle fought against the arch-enemy of German Social Democracy, Tsarist Russia, had endeared him to many on the moderate left from 1914 onwards.

During World War I, the most celebrated tribute to Hindenburg was a 12-meter-tall (39 ft) wooden likeness erected in Berlin. What admirers paid to drive in nails—ultimately 30 tons of them—went to war widows. Smaller versions were erected throughout Germany. The wooden images and his photographs invariably portray a resolute, indomitable warrior, wearing a stern likeness.

The famed zeppelin Hindenburg that was destroyed by fire in 1937 was named in his honor, as was the Hindenburgdamm, a causeway joining the island of Sylt to mainland Schleswig-Holstein that was built during his time in office. The previously Upper Silesian town of Zabrze (German: Hindenburg O.S.) was also renamed after him in 1915, as well as the SMS Hindenburg, a battlecruiser commissioned in the Imperial German Navy in 1917 and the last capital ship to enter service in the Imperial Navy. The Hindenburg Range in New Guinea, which includes perhaps one of the world's largest cliffs, the Hindenburg Wall, also bears his name.

Historian Christopher Clark has criticised Hindenburg in his role as head of state for:

Withdrawing his solemn constitutional oaths of 1925 and 1932 to make common cause with the sworn enemies of the Republic. And then, having publicly declared that he would never consent to appoint Hitler to any post [...] levered the Nazi leader into the German Chancellery in January 1933. The Field Marshal had a high opinion of himself, and he doubtless sincerely believed that he personified a Prussian "tradition" of selfless service. But he was not, in truth, a man of tradition [...] As a military commander and later as Germany's head of state, Hindenburg broke virtually every bond he entered into. He was not the man of dogged, faithful service, but the man of image, manipulation and betrayal.

Hindenburg is a controversial figure in German history. In recent years, numerous German local bodies have derecognised Hindenburg. In February 2020, Hindenburg's Berlin honorary citizenship was revoked. The decision was passed by Berlin's left-wing coalition of Social Democrats, The Left and Greens.

== Honours and arms ==
=== Awards and decorations ===
German honours

- Prussia:
  - Knight of the Red Eagle, 4th Class, with Swords, 7 April 1866
  - Iron Cross, 2nd Class, 1870; Jubiläumsspange ("Jubilee clip"), 1895; 1st Class, 1914; Grand Cross, 9 December 1916; with Golden Star, 25 March 1918
  - Knight of the Black Eagle, 18 March 1911
  - Pour le Mérite (military), 2 September 1914; with Oak Leaves, 23 February 1915
  - Grand Commander of the Royal House Order of Hohenzollern, with Star and Swords, 14 August 1917
  - Commander of Honour of the Johanniter Order
- (Hohenzollern-Sigmaringen) Hohenzollern: Cross of Honour of the Princely House Order of Hohenzollern, 1st Class with Swords
- Anhalt:
  - Grand Cross of Albert the Bear, with Crown and Swords
  - Friedrich Cross, 1st Class
- Baden: Grand Cross of the Zähringer Lion, 1903
- Bavaria: Grand Cross of the Military Order of Max Joseph
- (Saxe-Coburg and Gotha) (Duchy of Saxe-Altenburg) (Saxe-Meiningen) Ernestine duchies:
  - Grand Cross of the Saxe-Ernestine House Order, with Swords and Collar, 14 December 1914
  - Carl Eduard War Cross (Coburg)
- Mecklenburg:
  - Grand Cross of the Wendish Crown, with Golden Crown and Swords
  - Military Merit Cross, 1st Class (Schwerin)
  - Cross for Distinction in War (Strelitz)
- Oldenburg:
  - Grand Cross of the Order of Duke Peter Friedrich Ludwig, with Crown, Swords and Laurels
  - Friedrich August Cross, 1st Class
- Saxony:
  - Knight of the Military Order of St. Henry; Commander 1st Class, 21 December 1914; Grand Cross, 27 December 1916
  - Knight of the Rue Crown, 7 May 1918
- Württemberg:
  - Grand Cross of the Friedrich Order, 1902
  - Grand Cross of the Württemberg Crown, with Swords
  - Grand Cross of the Military Merit Order, 21 January 1915

Foreign honours

- Austria-Hungary:
  - Grand Cross of St. Stephen, 1914
  - Military Merit Cross, 1st Class, with War Decoration, 22 January 1917; in Diamonds, 5 November 1917
  - Gold Military Merit Medal ("Signum Laudis"), 5 August 1917
  - Grand Cross of the Military Order of Maria Theresa, 26 March 1918
- Kingdom of Bulgaria: Grand Cross of St. Alexander, with Swords and Collar
- Finland: Grand Cross of the Cross of Liberty, with Swords, 31 July 1918
- Kingdom of Italy: Grand Officer of Saints Maurice and Lazarus
- Ottoman Empire:
  - Order of Osmanieh, 1st Class in Diamonds
  - Order of Glory, with Swords
  - Order of the Medjidie, 1st Class with Swords and Diamonds
  - Gold Imtiyaz Medal
  - Gallipolli Star
- Spain:
  - Grand Cross of Military Merit
  - Knight of the Golden Fleece, 1931

=== Arms ===
Coat of arms of the ancient von Beneckendorff und von Hindenburg family

Coat of arms of Paul von Hindenburg as knight of the Spanish branch of the Order of the Golden Fleece

== See also ==
- 1925 German presidential election
- 1932 German presidential election
- German Reichsmark, coin
- Hindenburg light
- List of people on the cover of Time Magazine: 1920s − 22 March 1926

== Related articles ==
- Dioscuri (World War I)

== Bibliography ==
- Asprey, Robert (1991). The German High Command at War: Hindenburg and Ludendorff Conduct World War I. New York: W. Morrow.
- Dorpalen, Andreas (1964). Hindenburg and the Weimar Republic. Princeton, New Jersey: Princeton University Press. online free to borrow
- Eschenburg, Theodor (1972). "The Role of the Personality in the Crisis of the Weimar Republic: Hindenburg, Brüning, Groener, Schleicher". In Holborn, Hajo (ed.). Republic to Reich – The Making Of The Nazi Revolution. New York: Pantheon Books. pp. 3–50.
- Evans, Richard J. (2003). The Coming of the Third Reich. London: Allen Lane. ISBN 0-7139-9648-X.
- Eyck, Erich. A history of the Weimar Republic: v. 1. From the collapse of the Empire to Hindenburg's election (1962) online
- Falter, Jürgen W. "The Two Hindenburg Elections of 1925 and 1932: A Total Reversal of Voter Coalitions" Historical Social Research / Historische Sozialforschung. Supplement, No. 25, (2013), pp. 217–232 online
- Feldman, G.D. (1966). Army, Industry and Labor in Germany, 1914–1918. Princeton, New Jersey: Princeton University Press.
- Figes, Orlando (1998). A People's Tragedy – The Russian Revolution: 1891–1924. London: Penguin Books. ISBN 978-0-14-024364-2.
- Hindenburg, Gert von. Hindenburg 1847–1934 Soldier and Statesman (1935) Online
- Jäckel, Eberhard (1984). Hitler in History. Hanover, New Hampshire: Brandeis University Press.
- Herwig, Holger L. (1997). The First World War, Germany and Austria-Hungary 1914–1918. London: Arnold. pp. 130–134.
- Hindenburg, Marshal von (1921). Out of my life. Translated by F. A. Holt. New York: Harper & Brothers.
- Keegan, John (1999). The First World War. London: Pimlico. ISBN 978-0-7126-6645-9.
- Kershaw, Sir Ian (1998). "1889–1936: Hubris". Hitler (German ed.). New York: W. W. Norton & Company. p. 659.
- Kitchen, Martin (1976). The Silent Dictatorship: The Politics of the High Command under Hindenburg and Ludendorff, 1916–1918. London: Croom Helm.
- Ludendorff, Erich (1919). Meine Kriegserinnerungen 1914–1918 [My War Memoirs 1914–1918] (in German). Vol. 1. Berlin: E.S. Mittler. pp. 134–138.
- Ludwig, Emil. Hindenburg And The Saga Of The German Revolution (1935) online
- Lupfer, T. (1981). The Dynamics of Doctrine: The Change in German Tactical Doctrine During the First World War (PDF). Fort Leavenworth: United States Army Command and General Staff College. OCLC 8189258. Archived (PDF) from the original on 4 March 2017.
- MacDonald, John (1987) [1984]. Great Battlefields of the World. Edison, New Jersey: Chartwell Books. ISBN 0-7858-1719-0.
- Menge, Anna (July 2008). "The Iron Hindenburg: A Popular Icon of Weimar Germany". German History. 26 (3): 357–382. doi:10.1093/gerhis/ghn025 – via Oxford Academic.
- Mulligan, William (2005). The Creation of the Modern German Army: General Walther Reinhardt and the Weimar Republic, 1914–1930. New York: Berghahn Books. p. 96. ISBN 1-57181-908-8.
- Scully, Richard. "Hindenburg: The Cartoon Titan of the Weimar Republic, 1918–1934". German Studies Review (2012): 541–565. online, caricatures
- Sheldon, J. (2008). The German Army on Vimy Ridge 1914–1917. Barnsley: Pen and Sword Books. ISBN 978-1-84415-680-1.
- Shirer, William L. (1960). The Rise and Fall of the Third Reich. New York: Simon and Schuster.
- Turner, Henry Ashby (1996). Hitler's Thirty Days to Power: January 1933. Reading, Massachusetts: Addison-Wesley. ISBN 978-0-201-40714-3.
- von der Goltz, Anna (2009). Hindenburg: Power, Myth, and the Rise of the Nazis. Oxford; New York: Oxford University Press. ISBN 978-0-19-957032-4.
- Wheeler-Bennett, Sir John (1967) [1936]. Hindenburg: the Wooden Titan. London: Macmillan.

=== Historiography and memory ===
- Barrett. Michael B. "Review of Hoegen, Jesko von, Der Held von Tannenberg: Genese und Funktion des Hindenburg-Mythos (1914–1934)". (H-German, H-Net Reviews. September 2009) online in English
- Frankel. Richard E. "Review of Pyta, Wolfram, Hindenburg: Herrschaft zwischen Hohenzollern und Hitler". H-German, H-Net Reviews. (March 2009). online in English
- Von der Goltz, Anna. Hindenburg: Power, Myth, and the Rise of the Nazis (Oxford University Press, 2009)

=== In German ===
- Maser, Werner (1990). Hindenburg: Eine politische Biographie. Rastatt: Moewig.
- Pyta, Wolfram: Hindenburg. Herrschaft zwischen Hohenzollern und Hitler. Siedler, München, 2007, ISBN 978-3-88680-865-6, Online review in English
- Rauscher, Walter: Hindenburg. Feldmarschall und Reichspräsident. Ueberreuter, Wien 1997, ISBN 3-8000-3657-6.
- von Hoegen, Jesko: Der Held von Tannenberg. Genese und Funktion des Hindenburg–Mythos (1914–1934). Böhlau, Köln, 2007, ISBN 978-3-412-17006-6.
- Zaun, Harald: Paul von Hindenburg und die deutsche Außenpolitik 1925–1934. Köln/Weimar/Wien, 1999, ISBN 3-412-11198-8.

Military offices
Preceded by Maximilian von Prittwitz	Commander, 8th Army; 1914	Succeeded by Richard von Schubert
New title	Commander, 9th Army; 1914	Succeeded by August von Mackensen
New title	Oberbefehlshaber Ost; 1914–1916	Succeeded by Prince Leopold of Bavaria
Preceded by Erich von Falkenhayn	Chief of the General Staff; 1916–1919	Succeeded by Wilhelm Groener
Preceded by Friedrich Ebert	Supreme Commander of the Reichswehr; 1925–1934	Succeeded by Adolf Hitler
Political offices
Preceded by Friedrich Ebert	President of Germany; 1925–1934	Succeeded by Adolf Hitler as Führer of Germany
