= Khetagurov =

Khetagurov (masculine), Khetagurova (feminine) is the Russian-language rendering of the Ossetian surname Хетӕгкаты, derived from the Ossetian given name Хетӕг, Khetag. It may also be transliterated as Khatagurov/Khatagurova. Notable people with the surname include:

- Kosta Khetagurov, national poet of the Ossetian people
- Georgy Khetagurov, Ossetian Soviet Army general
- Valentina Khetagurova, Soviet political activist and statesman
