= Snetkov =

Snetkov (masculine, Russian: Снетков) or Snetkova (feminine, Russian: Снеткова) is a Russian surname. Notable people with the surname include:

- Boris Snetkov (1925–2006), Soviet general
