= 82nd Guards Rifle Division =

- Active: 1943–1947
- Country: Soviet Union
- Branch: Red Army
- Type: Division
- Role: Infantry
- Engagements: Izyum-Barvenkovo Offensive; Donbas Strategic Offensive (August 1943); Battle of the Dnieper; Nikopol–Krivoi Rog Offensive; Odessa Offensive; First Jassy-Kishinev Offensive; Operation Bagration; Lublin–Brest Offensive; Vistula-Oder Offensive; Battle of Poznań (1945); Battle of the Seelow Heights; Battle of Berlin
- Decorations: Order of the Red Banner; Order of Bogdan Khmelnitsky
- Battle honours: Zaporozhye

Commanders
- Notable commanders: Maj. Gen. Ivan Alekseevich Makarenko; Maj. Gen. Georgii Ivanovich Khetagurov; Maj. Gen. Mikhail Ilich Duka

The 82nd Guards Rifle Division was reformed as an elite infantry division of the Red Army in March 1943, based on the 2nd formation of the 321st Rifle Division, and served in that role until after the end of the Great Patriotic War, including briefly in the Soviet Army.

It was redesignated after the Battle of Stalingrad in recognition of the division's service during the battle, specifically the encirclement and the siege of the German forces in the city, and later for its pursuit of the defeated Axis forces in Operation Little Saturn. It re-entered the fighting in July 1943 as part of the 29th Guards Rifle Corps of 8th Guards Army during the battles for the liberation of the Donbas region and won a divisional honorific in October. During the winter it saw extensive action in the great bend of the Dniepr River before advancing toward Odessa in the spring, where it won its first divisional decoration. The 82nd Guards continued a record of distinguished service through the rest of the Great Patriotic War. Following the fighting along the Dniestr River in the spring of 1944 it was reassigned with its Army to the 1st Belorussian Front and took part in the later part of the Soviet summer offensive, eventually helping to carve out the bridgehead across the Vistula River at Magnuszew. From this springboard, after heavy defensive fighting, it advanced across western Poland and into Germany in early 1945 and gained many distinctions in the battles for Poznań. On the approaches to Berlin it cleared the town of Müncheberg which gave its Front an opening to the German capital. Following the Battle of Berlin the division and its subunits received further distinctions in the aftermath of the German surrender and it continued to serve postwar in the Group of Soviet Forces in Germany but despite an admirable record it was gradually disbanded from mid-1946 to mid-1947.

== Formation ==
The 82nd Guards was one of nearly twenty Guards rifle divisions created in the aftermath of the fighting for Stalingrad. It was officially redesignated on March 19, 1943 in recognition of the 321st Rifle Division's steadfast qualities in the encirclement and siege of the German 6th Army in the Battle of Stalingrad, and in particular its pursuit of the defeated Axis forces from the Caucasus steppes. It officially received its Guards banner on April 11. At that time its order of battle became as follows:

- 242nd Guards Rifle Regiment (from 484th Rifle Regiment)
- 244th Guards Rifle Regiment (from 488th Rifle Regiment)
- 246th Guards Rifle Regiment (from 493rd Rifle Regiment)
- 185th Guards Artillery Regiment (from 986th Artillery Regiment)
- 86th Guards Antitank Battalion
- 83rd Guards Reconnaissance Company
- 91st Guards Sapper Battalion
- 111th Guards Signal Battalion
- 88th Guards Medical/Sanitation Battalion
- 85th Guards Chemical Defense (Anti-gas) Company
- 87th Guards Motor Transport Company
- 84th Guards Field Bakery
- 80th Guards Divisional Veterinary Hospital
- 1857th Field Postal Station
- 1176th Field Office of the State Bank

The 489th Antiaircraft Battery which had been part of the 321st was disbanded the same day the division received its banner. The division continued under the command of Maj. Gen. Ivan Alekseevich Makarenko, who had commanded the 321st since August 24, 1942. At the time it was formed it was noted that 70 percent of the division's personnel were of Yakut or Buryat nationality.

When the division was redesignated it was under command of the 5th Tank Army in Southwestern Front, and remained in that Army into April, when it was reassigned to 62nd Army as that army was being reformed as the 8th Guards Army. The 82nd was quickly assigned to the new 29th Guards Rifle Corps, and remained under these two commands for the duration of the war and into the postwar era.

== Into Ukraine ==
8th Guards Army saw its first action in the Izium-Barvenkovo Offensive which began on July 17 but apart from gaining several new bridgeheads over the Donets River this attack was largely abortive. A second effort began on August 13 and although Southwestern Front was initially unable to penetrate the front of 1st Panzer Army south of Izium the Southern Front broke through the recreated 6th Army beginning on August 18. By August 23 1st Panzer was also in trouble with its army corps south of Izium reduced to a combat strength of just 5,800 men and unable to hold a continuous line. On the 31st Field Marshal E. von Manstein was finally authorized to withdraw both armies to the Kalmius River, effectively beginning the race to the Dniepr. In a slashing attack on the morning of September 6 Southwestern Front rammed through a mechanized corps and nine rifle divisions north of the boundary between the two German armies, unhinging the Kalmius line.

During the Battle of the Dniepr, 8th Guards Army closed on the city of Zaporozhye, which had been von Manstein's headquarters in early September. On Hitler's orders 1st Panzer Army held a bridgehead over the river centered on the city. Southwestern Front's first attack on October 1 made minor gains that were soon erased by counterattacks. This led to a week-long pause in operations for regrouping. On the morning of October 10 the 8th and 3rd Guards Armies renewed the offensive against the bridgehead beginning with a very powerful artillery preparation. While the bridgehead line held the casualties on both sides were very heavy and the commander of 1st Panzer Army again requested permission to withdraw, which was refused. A night attack on the 13th, supported by another massive artillery bombardment, compelled the German forces to abandon the city the next day. In recognition of its role in this success, the men and women of the division were awarded the city's name as an honorific:

ZAPOROZHYE... 82nd Guards Rifle Division (Maj. Gen. Makarenko, Ivan Alekseevich)... The troops who participated in the liberation of Zaporozhye, by the order of the Supreme High Command of 14 October 1943, and a commendation in Moscow, are given a salute of 20 artillery salvoes from 224 guns.

In the fighting for Zaporozhye Starshina Feodosii Andreevich Shchur, an assistant platoon commander of a machine gun company of the 244th Guards Rifle Regiment, distinguished himself both in the fighting for the German bridgehead and later in establishing a foothold on the west bank of the Dniepr. He was credited with the destruction of two German machine guns and as many as 60 German soldiers and officers, some in hand-to-hand combat. In recognition he would be made a Hero of the Soviet Union on February 22, 1944. Shchur survived the war but was killed in a mine rescue operation in the Chelyabinsk region in 1954. On October 20 Southwestern Front was redesignated as 3rd Ukrainian Front.

=== Battles in the Dniepr Bend ===
Both 3rd and 4th Ukrainian Fronts attempted to rush the cities of Nikopol and Krivoi Rog in December but this was unsuccessful. 3rd Ukrainian faced a well-fortified line along the Kamianka River. On January 10, 1944 it attacked in the direction of Apostolove but this effort also failed after a week. A revised plan called for the 46th Army, 8th Guards Army and the 4th Guards Mechanized Corps to remount the offensive on Apostolove with the objective of reducing Nikopol in cooperation with 4th Ukrainian Front. This new effort began on January 30 and the defense system covering the two cities was finally cracked on February 5 when Apostolove was taken, splitting the 6th Army. 46th and 8th Guards Armies now turned west toward the Inhulets River while elements of 4th Ukrainian Front cleared Nikopol on February 9. Krivoi Rog was covered in part by defenses along the Inhulets which were breached by 8th Guards at Shyroke on February 6 but it wasn't until February 22 that the city was liberated by 37th Army. At this point 3rd Ukrainian Front was poised to strike along the Mykolaiv - Odessa axis.

=== Battles on the Dniestr ===
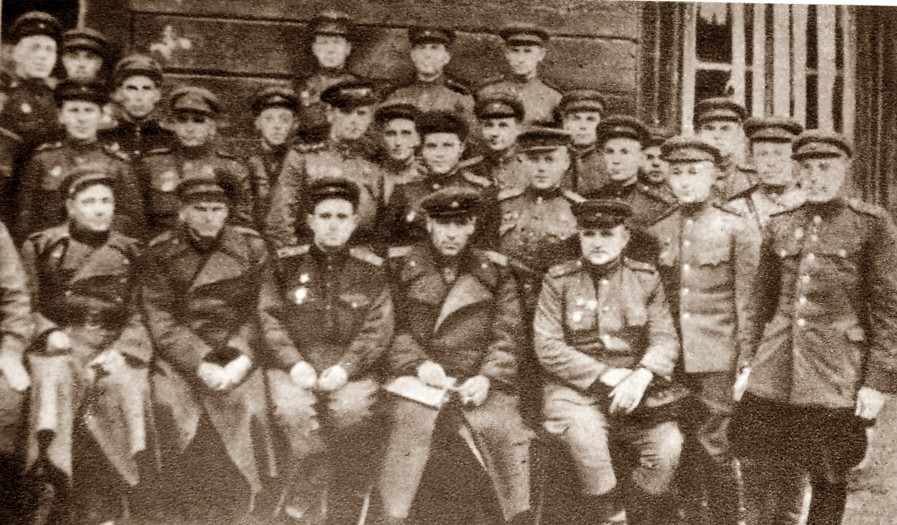
Maj. Gen. G. I. Khetagurov (seated front center in overcoat) with other officers of the 82nd Guards, Nov. 1944

On April 1 General Makarenko was assigned to attend the Voroshilov Academy and handed his command to Lt. Col. Matvei Yakovlevich Karnaukhov; this officer in turn would be replaced by Maj. Gen. Georgii Ivanovich Khetagurov on May 9. As the Odessa Offensive continued in early April the 8th Guards Army was advancing through difficult conditions along the southernmost sector of the front in Ukraine, along the northern shores of the Black Sea. Mykolaiv had been liberated on March 28 and shortly after several German and Romanian divisions were trapped at Rozdilna. The Front's center and left flank armies now advanced directly on Odessa and on April 10 that city was liberated by a three-pronged attack by 8th Guards, 6th and 5th Shock Armies. For its role in the liberation of Odessa, on April 20 the 82nd Guards would be awarded the Order of Bogdan Khmelnitsky, 2nd Degree.

Following this, 8th Guards Army advanced to the estuary of the Dniestr River by the 13th. This was a strategic dead end, and in early May, during the First Jassy-Kishinev Offensive, the army was ordered north along the east bank of the river to relieve 5th Guards Army in the bridgehead it held at Tașlîc. This relief occurred over the nights of May 5, 6 and 7. The 82nd Guards did not enter the bridgehead immediately, but remained with 29th Guards Corps (27th, 74th and 82nd Guards) holding the east bank between Tașlîc and Grigoriopol. All this activity was not missed by the Axis forces on the west bank, and very early on May 10 the XXXX Panzer Corps launched a powerful attack to drive in the bridgehead. Over the next three days this assault drove the bridgehead back until it was about 11km wide but only 1-3km deep. On the morning of May 14 the division entered the bridgehead near Puhăceni and relieved the 39th Guards Rifle Division, helping to stabilize the situation. Due to this setback, among others, the Soviet offensive was halted, and would not resume until August.

== Operation Bagration ==
At a STAVKA conference held in Moscow in the last days of May it was decided to reassign the 8th Guards Army to the left wing of the 1st Belorussian Front as part of the preparations for the main Soviet summer offensive. The Army would remain in this Front for the duration of the war. This movement was not completed until late June, after the first phase of the offensive was completed, but in time to take a leading role in the Lublin–Brest Offensive. The 8th Guards was one of five combined-arms armies and a tank army ordered to be prepared to attack by July 17 in the direction of Siedlce and Lublin, with part of these forces to capture Brest in conjunction with the Front's right wing forces. The 11th Tank Corps was designated as the Army's mobile group.

Brest was liberated on July 28 after which the Front commander, Marshal K. K. Rokossovskii, directed his main forces along the Warsaw axis. During the night of August 1 the 8th Guards Army seized a bridgehead over the Vistula in the Magnuszew area. During the following days the main forces of the Army were ferried across and by the end of August 2 had expanded the bridgehead to 19km in width and up to 6km in depth. Through the rest of the month until August 28 the 8th Guards Army continued to expand its foothold in cooperation with the 69th Army at Puławy, repelling numerous German tank and infantry counterattacks and eventually reaching the mouth of the Pilica River. The next day the STAVKA ordered the Army to go over to the defensive.

During one of the counterattacks against the Magnuszew bridgehead Sen. Sgt. Suren Akopovich Kasparyan became a Hero of the Soviet Union. A gunner of the 86th Guards Antitank Battalion, on August 20 his battery faced an attack by infantry supported by 19 medium and heavy tanks. With his first shot he knocked one of these out. Over the next several minutes Kasparyan destroyed or disabled four more tanks, causing the remainder to retreat. As they drew back a parting shot destroyed his gun and wounded him, but he refused to be evacuated until ordered. On November 18 he was officially awarded his Gold Star. Kasparyan was demobilized in 1947 but was recalled to the Army in 1951 and over the next 18 months attended officer training, receiving the rank of captain before returning to the reserve in 1956. He then worked in management in several factories, eventually returning to Yerevan before he died in 1994.

== Into Poland ==
The 82nd Guards remained in the Magnuszew bridgehead into January, 1945 with the rest of its Corps and Army. In the plan for the Vistula-Oder operation the 8th Guards was assigned a breakthrough front 7km wide and had 250 guns and mortars per kilometre of this front. It was to break through the German defense between Matyldzin and Chmeilnik with the objective of launching an attack toward Jedlińsk and Radom on the second day. The 1st Guards Tank Army would be committed on the third day and lead the 8th Guards to the intermediate goal of the fortified city of Poznań which was to be reached by the third week.

1st Belorussian Front began its breakout from the Magnuszew and Puławy bridgeheads at 0855 hours on January 14 following a 25-minute artillery onslaught from all the Front's artillery. The 82nd Guards had formed a special assault battalion in common with the rest of the first echelon divisions and these quickly captured up to four lines of German trenches. The division's main forces, supported by a double rolling barrage, took advantage of this success, broke through the main defensive zone and advanced 12-13km during the day. The offensive developed successfully overnight and into January 15 despite the arrival of XXXX Panzer Corps. 1st Guards Tank was committed early and pushed the German force back to the west with heavy losses, after which the Soviet armies went over to the pursuit. In recognition of the 82nd Guards' leading role in the breakout from the Magnuszew bridgehead, on February 19 all four of its regiments would be awarded the Order of the Red Banner.

=== Battle for Poznań ===
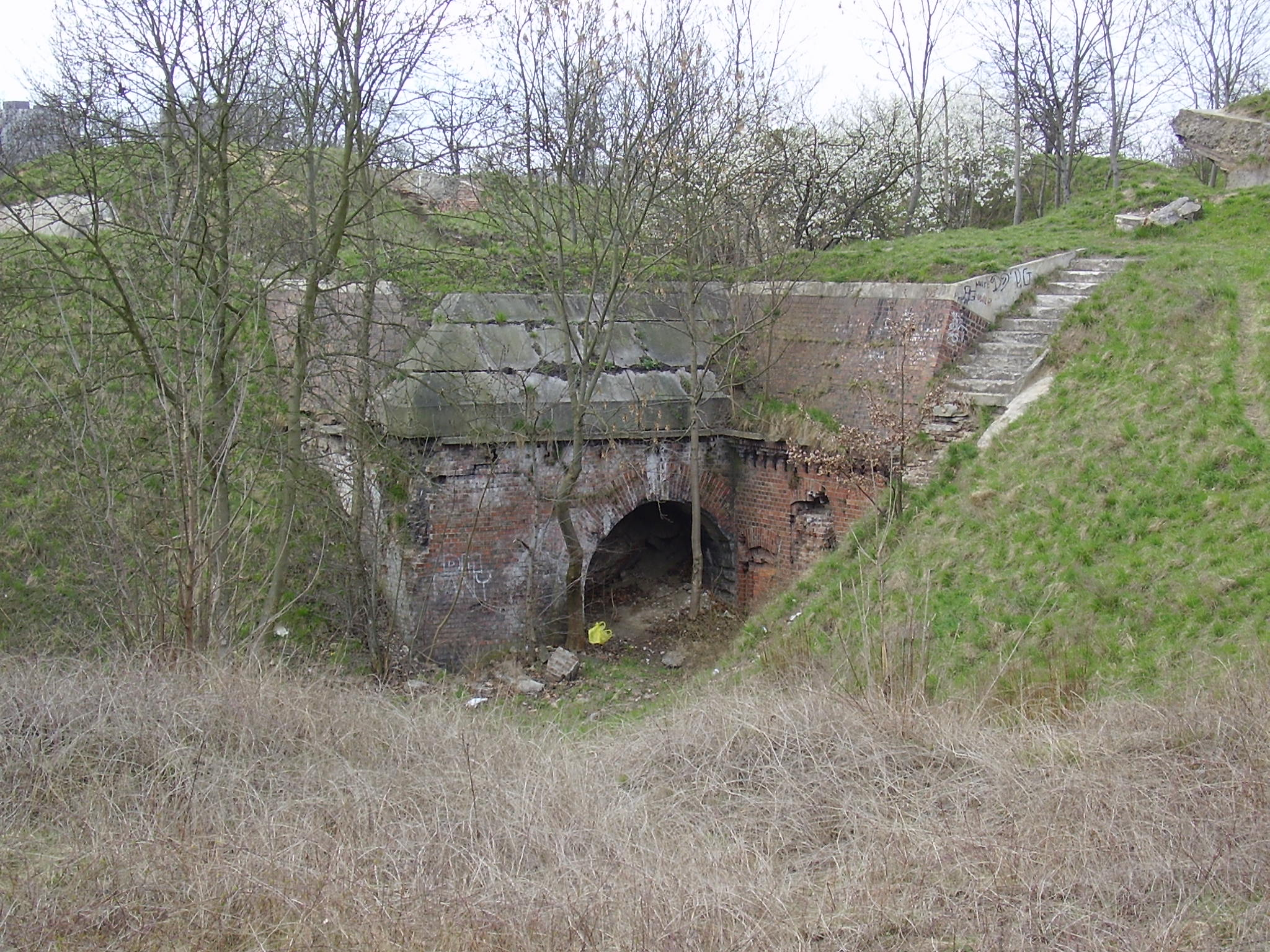
Modern-day (2007) ruins of Fort No. 5 Poznań

During January 18-19 the 8th Guards Army advanced up to 55km and with the assistance of the 11th and 9th Tank Corps liberated the city of Łódź; for its part in this victory the 242nd Guards Rifle Regiment (Col. Noskov, Sergei Petrovich) would receive its name as an honorific. Despite the appearance of German reserves the advance of 1st Belorussian Front reached the Poznań defensive line late on January 22 and the city was blockaded by 1st Guards Tank Army on January 24. On January 26 the Front commander, Marshal G. K. Zhukov, delivered a plan to the STAVKA that called for the 8th Guards Army to reach the Oder within a week and force a crossing in the Küstrin area. However an initial attempt by the 1st Guards and 2nd Guards Tank Armies to take Poznań from the march failed and, with a garrison of 60,000 men, it would clearly be a hard nut to crack. Elements of 8th Guards Army, including the 29th Guards Corps, took over most of 1st Guards Tank's sector of the blockade late on January 25 while the remainder of the Army advanced on Küstrin. The German garrison was forced to rely on air supply.

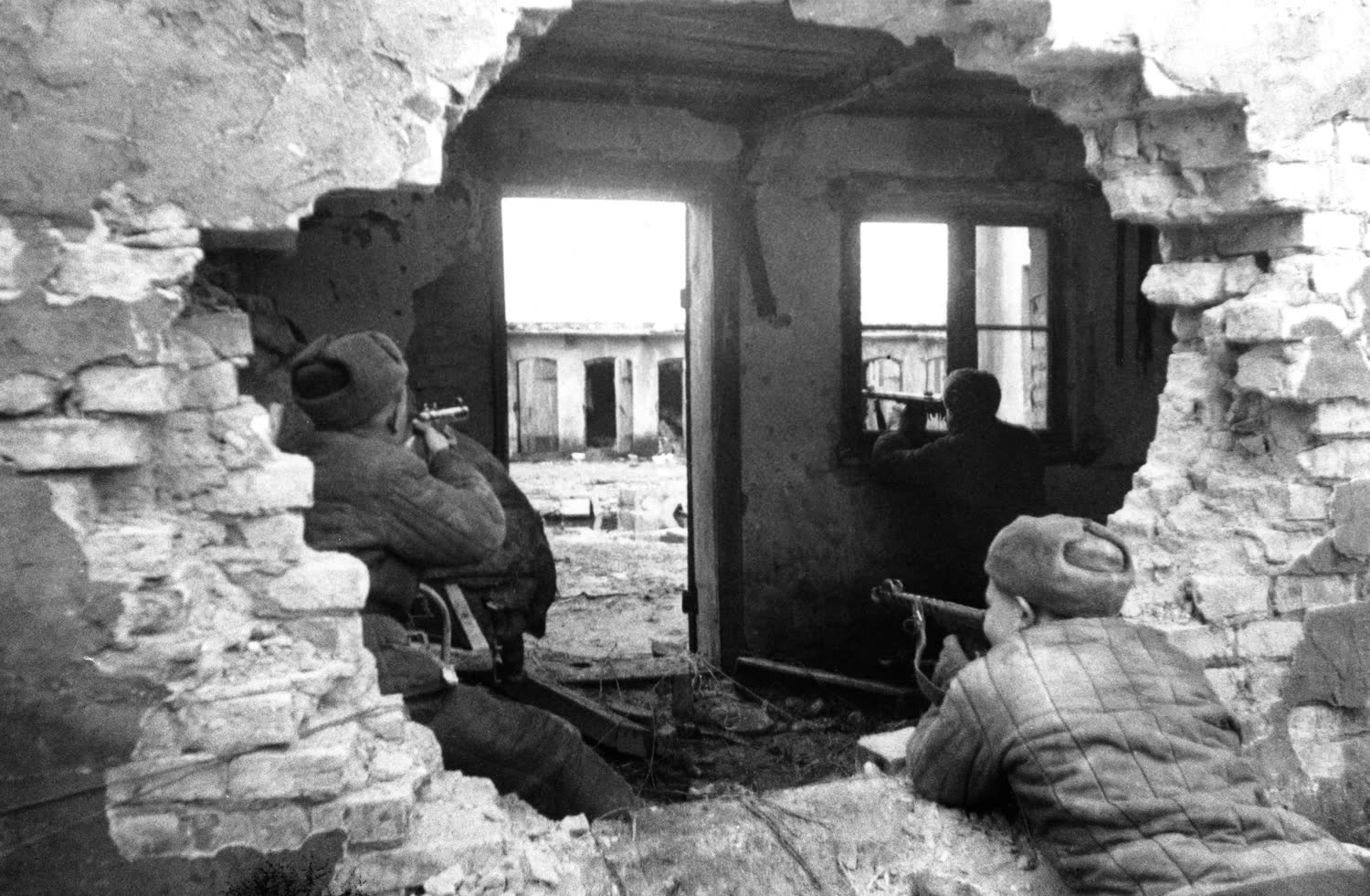
Submachine gunners of the 244th Guards Rifle Regiment during the storming of Poznan. Private Mikhail Maksimovich Kichaev (farthest left) was killed during the battle on 19 February

In the advance from the Vistula the 3rd Battalion of the 246th Guards Regiment was commanded by Maj. Boris Vladimirovich Belyaev. On January 17 he had led his unit into the town of Rawa Mazowiecka. He was wounded in the fighting for Łódź but refused evacuation and remained in command of the Battalion. On February 19, during the storming of the Poznań fortress, he was killed in action. Belyaev would be posthumously made a Hero of the Soviet Union on March 24. Four days earlier the acting commander of the Regiment, Maj. Aleksandr Vasilievich Plyakin, had led his troops in a successful attack from three sides on Fort No. 5 which took 600 men of the garrison prisoner. On February 23 his soldiers assaulted the Poznań citadel through a breach made by heavy artillery fire, split its defenders into two parts and took another 2,000 prisoners in the last gasp of the defense. During late March he again distinguished himself for his leadership in the fighting for the fortress at Küstrin and would be made a Hero of the Soviet Union on May 31. Plyakin remained in the Soviet Army until 1955, reaching the rank of lieutenant colonel, and died at Volgograd in 1971.

When the fighting for the city ended on February 23 two of the division's regiments received honorifics:

POZNAN... 246th Guards Rifle Regiment (Lt. Col. Klepikov, Veniamin Stepanovich)... 185th Guards Artillery Regiment (Maj. Soluyanov, Grigorii Mikhailovich)... The troops who participated in the capture of Poznań and its fortress, by the order of the Supreme High Command of 23 February 1945, and a commendation in Moscow, are given a salute of 20 artillery salvoes from 224 guns.

In addition, on April 5 the 86th Guards Antitank Battalion would be presented with the Order of Aleksandr Nevsky for its part in this victory while the 244th Guards Rifle Regiment received the Order of Kutuzov, 3rd Degree. On April 6 General Khetagurov would be made a Hero of the Soviet Union in large part for his performance in the battle for Poznań.

== Into Berlin ==
The final offensive on the German capital began on April 16. After breaking out of the Küstrin bridgehead the units of 8th Guards Army were tasked with seizing the Seelow Heights on the west bank of the Oder. 29th Guards Corps reached the foot of the heights at 1800 hours. The 82nd Guards was in the Corps' second echelon and was concentrated in the Hagenow area while the 27th and 74th Guards Divisions immediately entered battle. The fighting continued until noon of the following day when the town of Seelow fell to the 57th Guards Rifle Division. The 82nd Guards was committed to the assault on April 18 in cooperation with the 8th Guards Mechanized Corps and after repulsing four German counterattacks advanced its right flank up to 8km having broken through the first intermediate position in the Diedersdorf area and reached the second intermediate position.

=== Battle for Müncheberg ===
The main objective of 8th Guards Army on April 19 was the town and strongpoint of Müncheberg which was part of the German third defensive zone and blocked to road to Berlin. It held up to three battalions of artillery and mortars and a large supply of ammunition. It was fortified with trenches on three sides, barricades and other engineering obstacles, and all stone buildings had been modified for defense. It was also situated on higher ground providing observation of any attack from the east. By 1000 hours the 82nd Guards was clearing out small German groups from the woods west of Jahnsfelde. General Khetagurov was then ordered to develop his attack against Müncheberg from the north while the 27th Guards, along with the 11th Guards Tanks, outflanked the town to the south. Following reconnaissance and a 30-minute artillery preparation the 29th Guards Corps attacked at 1330 hours. An impetuous attack by the 242nd Guards Regiment captured height 77.0 which was consolidated by one battalion. The other two battalions continued to the southwest, bypassed the Fauler See from the south and reached the Damsdorf - Müncheberg railway. Meanwhile, the 27th Guards was held up by heavy artillery and machine gun fire. At 1700 hours a second powerful artillery bombardment struck the north, east and southeast outskirts of Müncheberg, following which the 82nd Guards began storming the town. The garrison, which was now mostly encircled, began to retreat to the west. The division broke into the town's center at 1830 and completely cleared it by 2100. In this fighting it captured six tanks, 18 guns, seven mortars, and 35 machine guns. The Corps advanced another 10km by day's end, clearing the third defensive zone and opening the gates to Berlin.

=== Battle for Schöneiche ===
The advance continued on April 20 with all three divisions of 29th Guards Corps deployed in a single echelon and still supported by elements of 1st Guards Tank Army. Resistance in the Staatforst southwest of Müncheberg was overcome before coming up against a large German strongpoint at Kagel. During the day the Corps' right flank gained 12km while the left covered up to 30km. Due to this success the 8th Guards Army turned its front to the west and northwest during the day after completing the breakthrough of the German third defensive zone. The following day the Army reached Berlin's outer defensive line and the 29th Guards Corps faced particularly stubborn resistance in the defile between the Steinitzsee and the Kalksee which was covered by the Kalkberg strongpoint. After capturing this position the divisions, with the 11th Guards Tanks, completed an advance of 15km.

From the morning of April 22 the troops of both Armies captured the suburbs of Hoppegarten, Fichtenau and Rahnsdorf by noon. After an overnight advance, at 0500 hours the 242nd Guards Regiment reached the German positions at Schöneiche. These were located on a slight hill to the north and were held by a battalion of infantry backed by a battery of artillery and two tanks. The Regiment deployed its three battalions in a single line and attacked simultaneously from the front and the flanks without artillery preparation. The German infantry, taken by surprise in the pre-dawn gloom and in fear of being surrounded, quickly fell back to Schöneiche, abandoning two guns and a tank on the hill. The Regiment organized a pursuit which broke into the village and captured it; its 1st and 2nd Battalions reached its western outskirts before running into fire from machine guns, tanks and self-propelled guns from the edge of wood to the west. The 3rd Battalion cleared Fichtenau but after reaching its southern outskirts was also hit by German tank fire. Colonel Noskov dispatched a reconnaissance to uncover the German defensive system in the woods west of Schöneiche which soon reported that it was deep, with two lines of trenches and dug-in, camouflaged armor. Realizing the defenders would have the roads and cuttings through the woods pre-registered for fire Noskov chose to make a demonstration frontal attack with his 1st Battalion while the 2nd and 3rd make outflanking moves from the north. This attack began at noon and the 1st Battalion soon took the forward positions before advancing deeper, engaging the German trenches west of the sixth cutting by 1300 hours. With the defenders distracted by this effort the 2nd Battalion's automatic riflemen secretly infiltrated into the German rear and brought down heavy fire on their machine gun crews. The 3rd Battalion cut the Schöneiche - Friedrichshagen road, left a platoon of antitank riflemen to handle the dug-in armor and continued advancing to the west. The remaining defenders, seeing they were cut off, soon began to surrender.

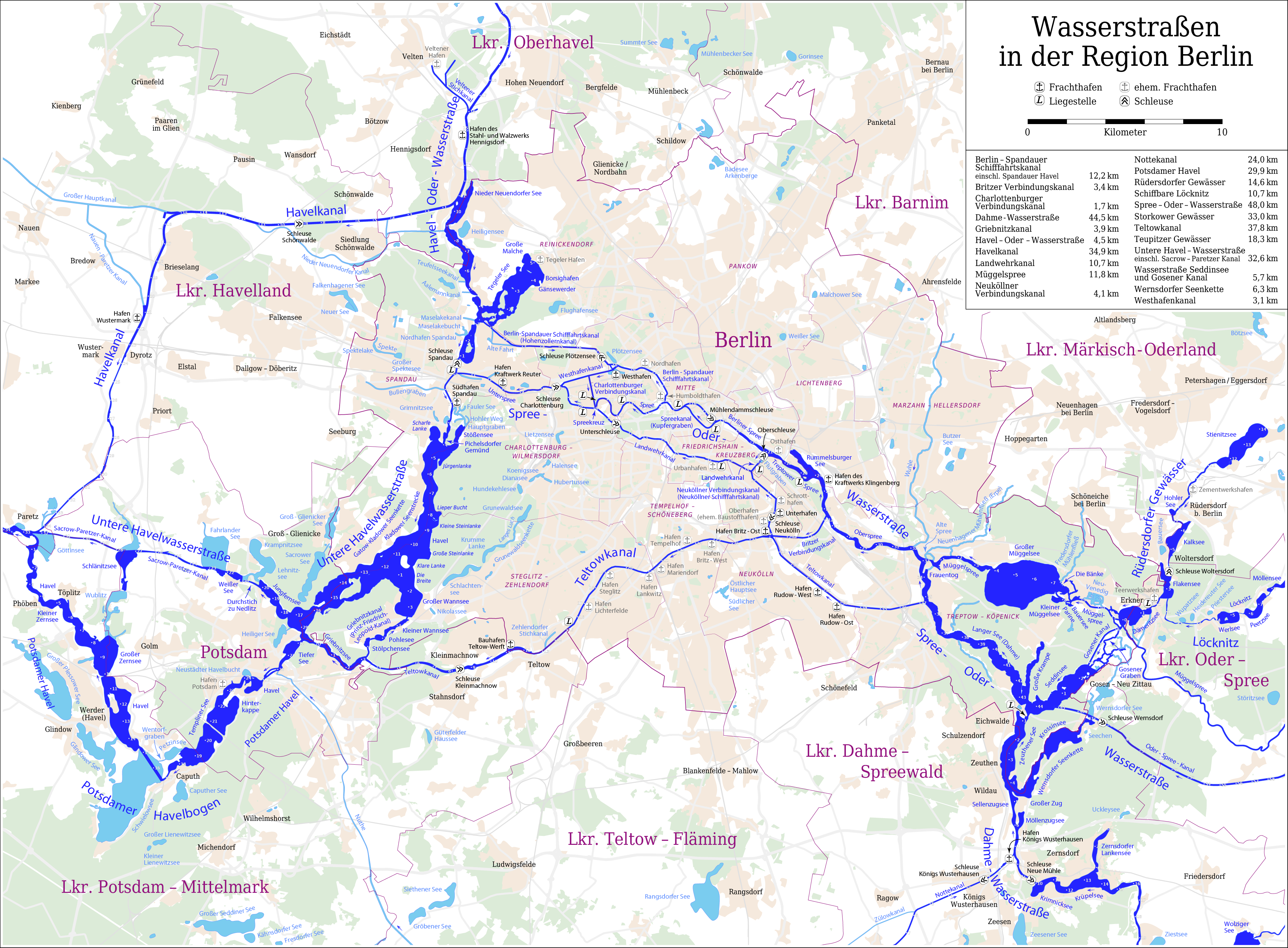
Map of waterways in the Berlin region

On April 23 General Khetagurov was appointed to command the 29th Guards Corps and was replaced the next day by Maj. Gen. Mikhail Ilich Duka. This officer had been made a Hero of the Soviet Union in September, 1942 for his leadership of the Kravtsov Partisan Brigade in the Bryansk Region before entering the active army in 1944. Shortly after taking command the division reached Köpenick at the confluence of the Dahme and the Spree, which the men of the 242nd Guards Regiment were unwilling to cross due to German fire. Leading by example, Duka jumped into the cold waters of the Spree following a short but powerful artillery barrage and brought his soldiers along with him; they soon broke into the streets of Köpenick and captured its northern part. Once across the Spree the 29th Guards Corps seized Adlershof and the way was open for 8th Guards and 1st Guards Tank Armies to the southeast outskirts of Berlin.

=== Battle for the Teltow Canal ===
By noon on April 25 the city had been completely encircled. Meanwhile, 8th Guards Army had renewed its offensive at 0800 hours and the 82nd Guards was tasked with forcing a crossing of the Teltow Canal. The 242nd Guards Regiment was attacking on the division's right flank and reached the south bank of the canal on the sector from the intersection of the Landwehr Canal to Rudower Strasse. The 244th and 246th Regiments reached Franz-Körner Strasse from Rudower Strasse to Hermannstrasse before beginning a firefight with German troops covering their units withdrawing across the bridge on the Rungiusstrasse. The canal, being 12m-15m wide and 5m deep with vertical banks in most places, was a serious obstacle especially for tanks and artillery. A reconnaissance by the 242nd Regiment found that a cemetery on the north bank was strongly held and well protected by a massive stone wall and also established the presence of a German tank dug in at the corner of Rudower Strasse. It was clear that the Rungiusstrasse bridge would be blown once the remaining German infantry had crossed. With these factors in mind General Duka ordered the 242nd Regiment to force the canal east of the bridge and then attack to the northwest to outflank the cemetery.

The forcing attempt began at 1600 hours. Gardens and huts provided covered approaches to the canal and the factory buildings north of the canal on this sector were not as strongly held or fortified as the cemetery. The Regiment's guns and machine guns opened up direct fire providing cover for two companies of the 2nd Battalion to get across and seize several buildings in the factory courtyard. This in turn allowed the remainder of the Regiment to cross. Having occupied the factory and an adjacent residential quarter the Regiment turned west, crossed Rudower Strasse and began fighting on Jahnstrasse and Burger Strasse. Having suffered significant casualties from Soviet artillery and mortar fire the remaining defenders of the cemetery began to fall back on Knesebeckstrasse. Soon the 244th and 246th Regiments, reinforced with tanks of the 8th Guards Mechanized Corps, rushed the Rungiusstrasse bridge before it could be destroyed; the armor then ranged to the north while the 185th Guards Artillery and part of the 27th Guards Division crossed over. By 2300 hours the southern part of Neukölln had been secured by 29th Guards Corps.

During April 26 the Corps broke through the central defense line in the area of Hermann Station, captured Tempelhof Airport and by the end of the day was fighting in the city blocks northwest of the airport. On the following day the 82nd Guards attacked toward Anhalt Station. By 1500 hours the forward elements of the 242nd Guards Regiment, advancing on the division's right flank, reached the intersection of the Wartenbergstrasse and the Möckernstrasse. Groups of automatic riflemen crossed the latter and ascended the railroad embankment but were forced to fall back due to heavy fire from the station. An attempt by the left-flank regiments to cross the railroad hub to the south, in the area of Yorckstrasse, was also unsuccessful. General Duka re-aligned the division's front to the north to force a crossing of the Landwehr Canal to its south and begin fighting for the blocks adjacent to the station from that direction. The 242nd Guards first cleared the Grossbeerenstrasse to reach the canal south of Belle-Alliance-Platz where it made a difficult crossing on a broad front despite the width of the obstacle, the lack of intact bridges, and the stone and brick buildings on the north side. Artillery and tanks were later able to join via a bridge in the Alte Jakobstrasse area. By the end of the day parts of the 29th Guards Corps were battling for the German's last central defensive line along the sector from Belle-Alliance-Platz to Anhalt Station.

The main objective for 8th Guards Army on April 28 was to link up with 3rd Shock Army in the area of the Reichstag. This assignment went to the 4th and 29th Guards Corps which were supported by most of the Army's artillery, tanks and self-propelled guns and over the day they advanced 1,000m - 1,500m against desperate resistance.

On May 2 the 244th Guards Rifle Regiment (Lt. Col. Pavlenko, Konstantin Filatovich) was awarded the honorific "Berlin".

== Postwar ==
When the fighting ended, the men and women of the 82nd Guards had earned the full title of 82nd Guards Rifle, Zaparozhye, Order of Bogdan Khmelnitsky Division. (Russian: 82-я гвардейская стрелковая Запорожская ордена Богдана Хмельницкого дивизия.) On May 28 the division was presented with the Order of the Red Banner for its role in the battle for Berlin, and in a final round of awards on June 11 the following subunits also received decorations for the Berlin fighting: 242nd and 246th Guards Rifle Regiments (Order of Suvorov, 3rd Degree); 185th Guards Artillery Regiment (Order of Kutuzov, 3rd Degree); 91st Guards Sapper Battalion (Order of Aleksandr Nevsky). As a further honor, during the historic Victory Parade on Red Square in Moscow on June 24 General Duka was entrusted with carrying the symbolic key to the defeated city of Berlin.

The division continued to serve postwar in 8th Guards Army in the Group of Soviet Forces in Germany with the 29th Guards Rifle Corps. It was disbanded between the summer of 1946 and 1947.
