= Matvey Burlakov =

Soviet and Russian colonel general

Matvey Prokopyevich Burlakov
- Матвей Прокопьевич Бурлаков
- Born: 19 August 1935; Ulan-Ude, Buryat ASSR, Russian SFSR, Soviet Union
- Died: 8 February 2011 (aged 75); Moscow, Russia
- Burial place: Troyekurovskoye Cemetery
- Military career
- Allegiance: Soviet Union; Russia
- Branch: Soviet Army; Russian Ground Forces
- Service years: 1954–1995
- Rank: Colonel general
- Commands: Western Group of Forces; Southern Group of Forces; 39th Army; 29th Army
- Awards: Order of the Red Banner

Matvey Prokopyevich Burlakov (Russian: Матвей Прокопьевич Бурлако́в; 19 August 1935 – 8 February 2011) was a Soviet and Russian colonel general. As the last commander of the Western Group of Forces between 1990 and 1994, he was responsible for supervising the withdrawal of Russian troops from Germany.

== Early life and Cold War ==
Matvey Prokopyevich Burlakov was born on 19 August 1935 in Ulan-Ude, Buryatia, graduating from school No. 42 in that city. He began his military career in 1954 when he entered the Omsk Infantry School. After graduation he was assigned to command a rifle platoon in September 1957, beginning his active service in the Group of Soviet Forces in Germany. He rose to command a rifle company between September 1961 and September 1965, then entered the Frunze Military Academy for advanced training. After graduating from the Frunze Academy in 1968, Burlakov became deputy commander of a motor rifle regiment in Pechenga. He continued to advance, commanding a motor rifle regiment in Leningrad Oblast from December 1969 and from September 1973 to December 1975 commanded the 77th Guards Motor Rifle Division of the Leningrad Military District in Arkhangelsk Oblast. He was promoted to major general on 25 April 1975.

Graduating from the General Staff Academy in 1977, Burlakov took command of the 31st Army Corps of the Transcaucasian Military District at Kutaisi. A steady series of promotions followed as he was sent east to command the 29th Army at Ulan-Ude in September 1979, then the 39th Army in Mongolia in 1981. Appointed chief of staff of the Transbaikal Military District in June 1983, he completed the Higher Academic Course at the General Staff Academy in 1986. Burlakov was promoted to commander-in-chief of the Southern Group of Forces in June 1988. In this position, he began the withdrawal of Soviet troops from Hungary. In a June 1989 practical exercise for the leaders of the Soviet groups of forces stationed in Europe, Defense Minister Dmitry Yazov used the Southern Group of Forces as an example. The exercise included plans for the withdrawal of the Southern Group of Forces, and Deputy Defense Minister Pyotr Lushev told Burlakov that a withdraw from Germany loomed and that the latter's experience was useful.

== Withdrawal from Germany ==
On 14 December 1990, Burlakov became Commander-in-Chief of the Western Group of Forces (WGF, the former Group of Soviet Forces in Germany). Burlakov was the first commander of the group who was not a World War II veteran, and the last of sixteen commanders-in-chief of the Soviet troops in Germany. Soviet president Mikhail Gorbachev appointed him to the position at the recommendation of Yazov, who approved of Burlakov's handling of the withdrawal from Hungary. In this capacity he was responsible for the relocation of the largest Soviet force in Europe, 540,000 troops and their families, in addition to the withdrawal of over 100,000 items of military equipment, and the handing over of a thousand Soviet military properties.

Burlakov, already scheduled to replace Boris Snetkov in the position, took command ahead of schedule after Snetkov told Lushev that he would not implement the withdrawal agreement agreed with Germany in accordance with the Two Plus Four Treaty, which stipulated that the WGF would leave by 1994. In contrast, Burlakov's WGF staff completed a plan for the withdrawal and presented it to the German liaison team for treaty implementation under a month after the change of command. During the August coup later in 1991, Burlakov personally assured the Brandenburg prime minister Manfred Stolpe that the withdrawal would continue in accordance with treaty obligations. Despite political instability in the collapsing Soviet Union, the withdrawal from Germany continued to be a political inevitability and Russian president Boris Yeltsin committed to honoring the Two Plus Four Treaty after the Soviet breakup at the end of 1991. Yeltsin confirmed Burlakov in his position on 26 September 1992.

As the withdrawal continued, Burlakov dealt with the issues of environmental damage and housing in negotiations with the German liaison team. As treaty agreements provided for asset value of Soviet real estate to be offset against the German compensation claims, the WGF systematically covered up environmental damage to increase the real estate value of its properties while German authorities attempted to document the damage. Burlakov insisted publicly that "many of the cleanest areas in East Germany today are to be found on the military training grounds of the WGF" and had Russian-language copies of a NATO environmental education film distributed to WGF troops, but these measures proved ineffective at changing the situation of environmental neglect that prevailed at former Soviet military bases in East Germany. The environmental situation was settled when Yeltsin and German chancellor Helmut Kohl agreed to renounce both side's claims in December 1992. Due to a lack of housing in Russia for withdrawn soldiers, Burlakov repeatedly raised the issue with the German side as early as October 1991, attempting to tie the pace of the withdrawal to the construction of housing, but this proved unsuccessful since the Germans were not responsible for the Russian housing delays. Attempting to gain greater financial support from Germany for housing construction, Burlakov repeatedly brought attention to the complete lack of housing for many withdrawn soldiers in press conferences. Nevertheless, only half of the planned housing stock was complete by the time the WGF completely departed Germany in mid-1994.

== Corruption scandal and retirement ==
In this position Burlakov repeatedly was at the center of media attention due to scandalous revelations of wide-ranging corruption and theft of state property in the WGF. After the withdrawal of the WGF from Germany and its disbandment, Burlakov became a deputy minister of defense of Russia in August 1994. In November of that year, after the murder of the journalist Dmitry Kholodov, whose investigations implicated Burlakov and Defense Minister Pavel Grachev in crimes in the WGF, Burlakov was relieved of his position. He was retired in February 1995.

Burlakov served as head of the Union of Veterans of the Western Group of Forces (GSFG) from 19 February 1994 to his death.

He married Viktoriya Nikolayevna, with whom he had a son and daughter. Burlakov died on 8 February 2011 and was buried in the Troyekurovskoye Cemetery in Moscow. In commemoration, a memorial plaque dedicated to Burlakov was placed on the wall of School No. 42 in Ulan-Ude and in September 2022 a memorial bust of Burlakov was unveiled in the Oreshkov Park in that city.

== Decorations ==
Burlakov was a recipient of the following decorations:

- Order of the Red Banner
- Order of the Red Star
- Order "For Service to the Homeland in the Armed Forces of the USSR", 3rd class
- Order of the Red Banner (Mongolia)
- Medals
