= Komsomolsk–Dezhnyovka railway line =

Railway line in Russia

Railway line Komsomolsk-Dezhnyovka Комсомольск-на-Амуре — Дежнёвка
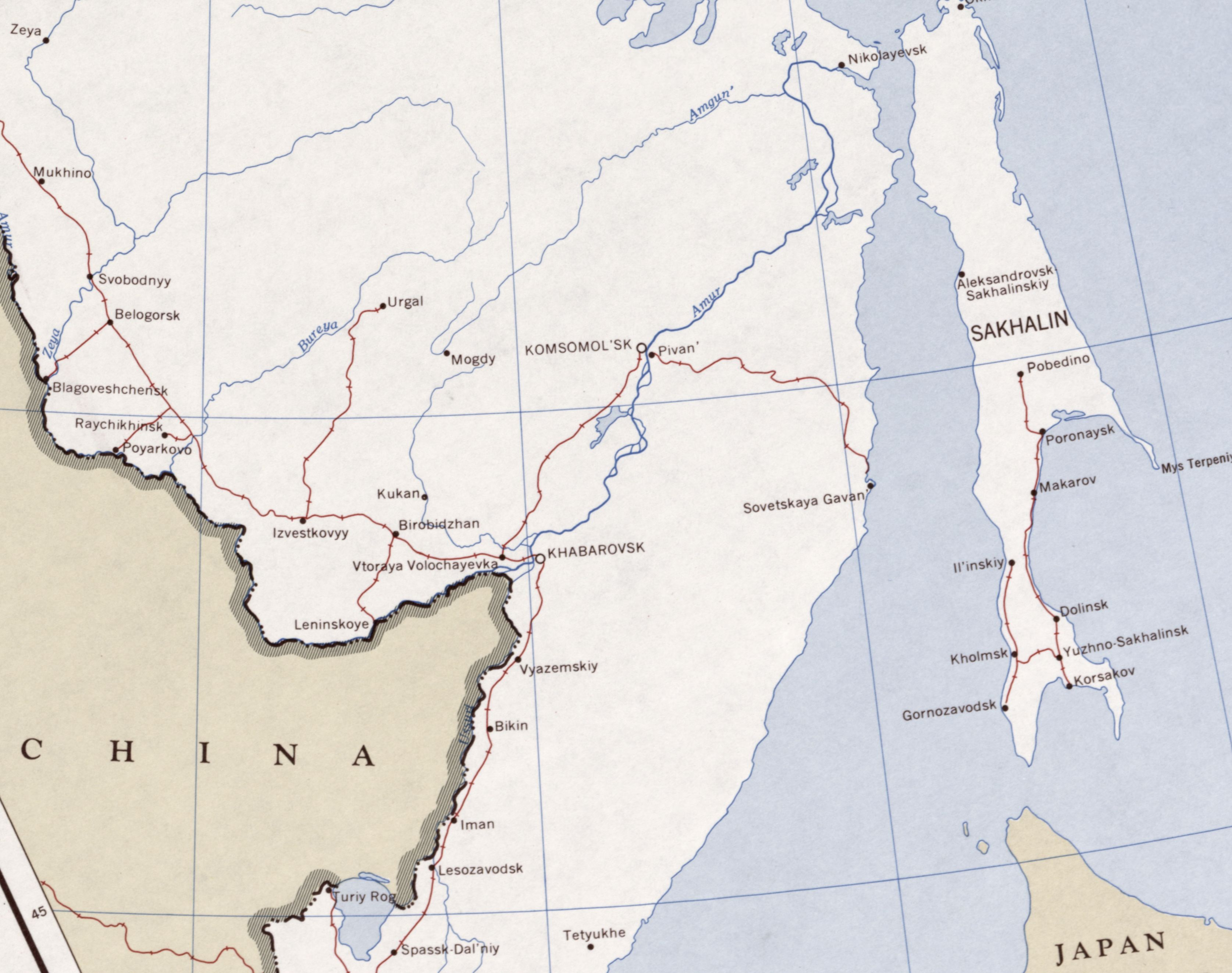

Overview
- Locale: Russia
- Dates of operation: 1940–

Technical
- Track gauge: 1,520 mm (4 ft 11 27/32 in)
- Length: 363km

Map of railway

The Komsomolsk–Dezhnyovka railway line (Russian: Комсомольск-на-Амуре — Дежнёвка) is about 363 km of Far Eastern Railway within Russian Railways. It connects Dezhnyovka station of Trans-Siberian Railway near Khabarovsk and Komsomolsk-on-Amur station of Baikal-Amur Mainline. The construction of this line began in 1935, and opened in 1940.

"Yunost" train connects from Khabarovsk to Komsomolsk-on-Amur, and the other train connects Vladivostok - Sovetskaya Gavan.

== See also ==
- Trans-Siberian Railway
- Baikal-Amur Mainline
