= Komsomolsk-on-Amur railway station =

Railway station in Russia

Komsomolsk-on-Amur Комсомольск-на-Амуре
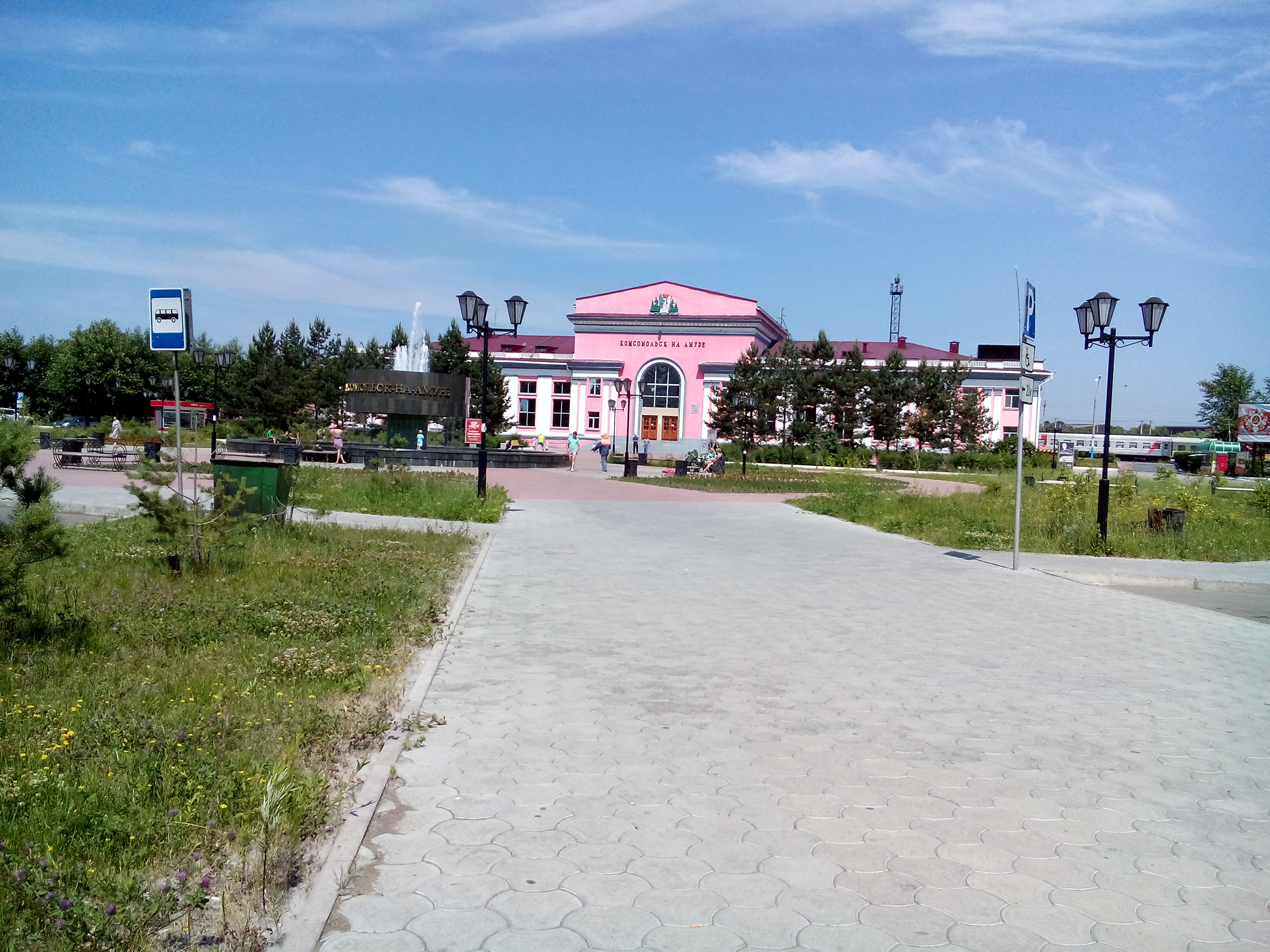
- Komsomolsk-on-Amur railway station

General information
- Location: Russia, Komsomolsk-on-Amur
- Coordinates: 50°33′7″N 136°59′23″E
- Owner: Russian Railways
- Platforms: 3

Other information
- Station code: 960103
- Fare zone: 0

History
- Opened: 1936

Services
Preceding station	Far Eastern Railway	Following station
Location

Komsomolsk-on-Amur railway station is a railway station in Komsomolsk-on-Amur, Russia.

Trains follow from the station in four directions:

- In the direction of Khabarovsk - freight and passenger traffic.
- In the direction of Tynda (BAM) - freight and passenger traffic.
- In the direction of Sovetskaya Gavan - freight and passenger traffic.
- In the direction of Dzemgi station - only freight traffic.

At this station, the locomotives of freight and passenger trains are switched over. Parking transit trains is about 1 hour.
