= Georgy Khetagurov =

Ossetian army general

Georgy Ivanovich Khetagurov
- Born: 25 April [O.S. 12 April] 1903; Tsmi, Terek Oblast, Russian Empire
- Died: 3 September 1975 (aged 72) Moscow, Soviet Union
- Buried: Novodevichy Cemetery
- Allegiance: Russian SFSR; Soviet Union
- Branch: Red Army (later Soviet Army)
- Service years: 1920–1971
- Rank: Army general
- Commands: 3rd Guards Army; 82nd Guards Rifle Division; 29th Guards Rifle Corps; 59th Rifle Corps; 30th Guards Rifle Corps; 8th Guards Army; Northern Group of Forces; Baltic Military District
- Conflicts: Russian Civil War; Chinese Civil War; Sino-Soviet conflict (1929); World War II; Great Patriotic War; Battle of Moscow; Battle of Stalingrad; Dnieper–Carpathian offensive; Operation Bagration; Vistula–Oder offensive; Battle of Berlin; Soviet–Japanese War; Battle of Mutanchiang; Occupation of Germany
- Awards: Hero of the Soviet Union; See awards
- Spouse: Valentina Khetagurova

Georgy Ivanovich Khetagurov (Russian: Георгий Иванович Хетагуров; 25 April [O.S. 12 April] 1903 – 3 September 1975) was an Ossetian army general of the Soviet Army and a Hero of the Soviet Union.

== Early life and Russian Civil War ==
Khetagurov was born on 25 April 1903 in the village of Tsmi, Terek Oblast. He enlisted in the Red Army in January 1920 during the Russian Civil War. As a Red Army man of the 2nd Caucasian Rifle Regiment of the South Ossetian Brigade, he fought in fighting on the Eastern Front at Buguruslan and in the North Caucasus at Kislovodsk between August and November 1920.

== Interwar period ==
After the end of the war, Khetagurov graduated from the 38th Pyatigorsk Infantry Courses at Kislovodsk in early 1922. From February of that year, he served with the 28th Mountain Rifle Division as an assistant platoon commander, training platoon commander with the divisional school, and platoon commander in the 84th Rifle Regiment. After graduating from the Kiev Combined Military School in August 1926, Khetagurov was sent to the 36th Rifle Division in Chita in the Transbaikal. There he served as a platoon commander and politruk of the 36th Artillery Regiment, and as a commander and politruk of a battery of the artillery battalion of the 108th Rifle Regiment. In November 1928 he transferred to serve in the latter position with the 25th Mountain Horse Artillery Battalion of the 5th Kuban Cavalry Brigade of the Transbaikal Group of Forces. With the brigade, Khetagurov fought in the 1929 Sino-Soviet conflict.

After completing the Novocherkassk Cavalry Improvement Courses for Commanders (KUKS) in 1931, Khetagurov returned to the Transbaikal to command a battalion of the 2nd Priamur Artillery Regiment of the 2nd Priamur Rifle Division of the Special Red Banner Far Eastern Army from December 1931, and in October 1932 became chief of artillery of the 1st Rifle Regiment of the army. After serving in the same position with the 4th Volochayevka Rifle Regiment, Khetagurov became chief of artillery of the De-Kastri Fortified Region in November 1933 before returning his previous post with the 4th Regiment in March 1934. He commanded the 3rd Separate Field Artillery Battalion from August 1935 and the 181st Artillery Regiment of the RGK from August 1937.

By now a colonel, Khetagurov was sent to study at the Higher Education Courses for Higher Commanders at the F. E. Dzerzhinsky Artillery Academy in February 1938. He did not complete the course, as he was dropped from them in August to be appointed chief of artillery of the 20th Rifle Corps of the 2nd Red Banner Army, back in the Soviet Far East. This proved brief and in October Khetagurov returned to his command of the 181st Artillery Regiment, which became part of the 2nd Red Banner Army. He was sent west to the 1st Moscow Proletarian Motor Rifle Division to serve as its chief of artillery in August 1939. While with the division, he completed two classes of the night school department of the Frunze Military Academy in the same year. From March 1941 Khetagurov served as chief of artillery of the 21st Mechanized Corps of the Leningrad Military District.

== World War II ==
After Operation Barbarossa began, Khetagurov and his unit fought in the border battles on the Northwestern Front from 23 June, defending in the area of Daugavpils and in the sector of Pskov. During these actions, he was wounded. From November he served as chief of staff of the 30th Army of the Kalinin Front in the Battle of Moscow. Khetagurov transferred to hold the same position with the new 3rd Guards Army of the Southwestern Front in the Battle of Stalingrad. He commanded the army between 14 March and 22 August 1943, a period in which it conducted an active defense on the line of the Seversky Donets in the area of Lysychansk. Khetagurov resumed his post as chief of staff for the recapture of Left-bank Ukraine later that year. He was transferred to serve as chief of staff of the 1st Guards Army in January 1944, participating in the Zhitomir–Berdichev Offensive and the Proskurov–Chernovitsy Offensive.

Khetagurov commanded the 82nd Guards Rifle Division from May 1944. As part of the 29th Guards Rifle Corps of the 8th Guards Army of the 3rd Ukrainian Front, his division fought in the fierce fighting to expand the Butor bridgehead on the western bank of the Dniester. In June the 82nd Guards and the army were withdrawn to the Reserve of the Supreme High Command and relocated to the 1st Belorussian Front for Operation Bagration and the Lublin–Brest Offensive. In the latter, Khetagurov led the division in the fighting for the Magnuszew bridgehead, after which it defended its positions in the bridgehead.

Khetagurov led his division in the attack out of the bridgehead during the January 1945 Warsaw–Poznan Offensive, in which it broke through German defenses and captured Łódź on 19 January. The division reached Poznań on 23 January and within a month captured the city in street fighting. For his "skillful leadership" of the division and "courageous actions," Khetagurov received the title Hero of the Soviet Union and was awarded the Order of Lenin on 6 April. In late March, the division fought in the fighting for Kustrin, then in the Berlin Offensive. Taking command of the 29th Guards Rifle Corps on 26 April, Khetagurov led it in the Berlin Offensive, during which it advanced to the Reichstag. Army commander Colonel General Vasily Chuikov recommended him for another award of the title Hero of the Soviet Union, but this was downgraded to the Order of Suvorov, 1st class.

After the end of the war in Europe, Khetagurov was sent to the Far East in July to command the 59th Rifle Corps of the 1st Red Banner Army in the Soviet invasion of Manchuria. He led the corps in the Battle of Mutanchiang and the subsequent capture of Harbin.

== Postwar ==
After the end of the war, Khetagurov returned to his previous command, now with the Group of Soviet Occupation Forces in Germany, in February 1946. After completing Higher Academic Courses at Voroshilov Higher Military Academy in April 1949, he was appointed commander of the 30th Guards Rifle Corps of the Leningrad Military District. In August 1952 he returned to Germany to serve as assistant commander of the 8th Guards Army, rising to command of the army in September 1954. Khetagurov advanced further to command the Northern Group of Forces in April 1958 and the Baltic Military District in March 1963, being promoted to army general in 1968. He remained in this post until assuming the sinecure post of inspector-advisor in the Group of Inspectors General in June 1971, which he held until his death in Moscow on 3 September 1975.

== Awards and honors ==
- Hero of the Soviet Union
- Three Order of Lenin
- Order of the October Revolution
- Five Order of the Red Banner
- Order of Suvorov 1st class
- Order of Kutuzov 1st and 2nd classes
- Order of the Red Star
- Order "For Service to the Homeland in the Armed Forces of the USSR" 3rd class
- campaign and jubilee medals
- foreign orders and medals
