= Komsomolsk-on-Amur =

City in Khabarovsk Krai, Russia

Komsomolsk-on-Amur Комсомольск-на-Амуре
- City
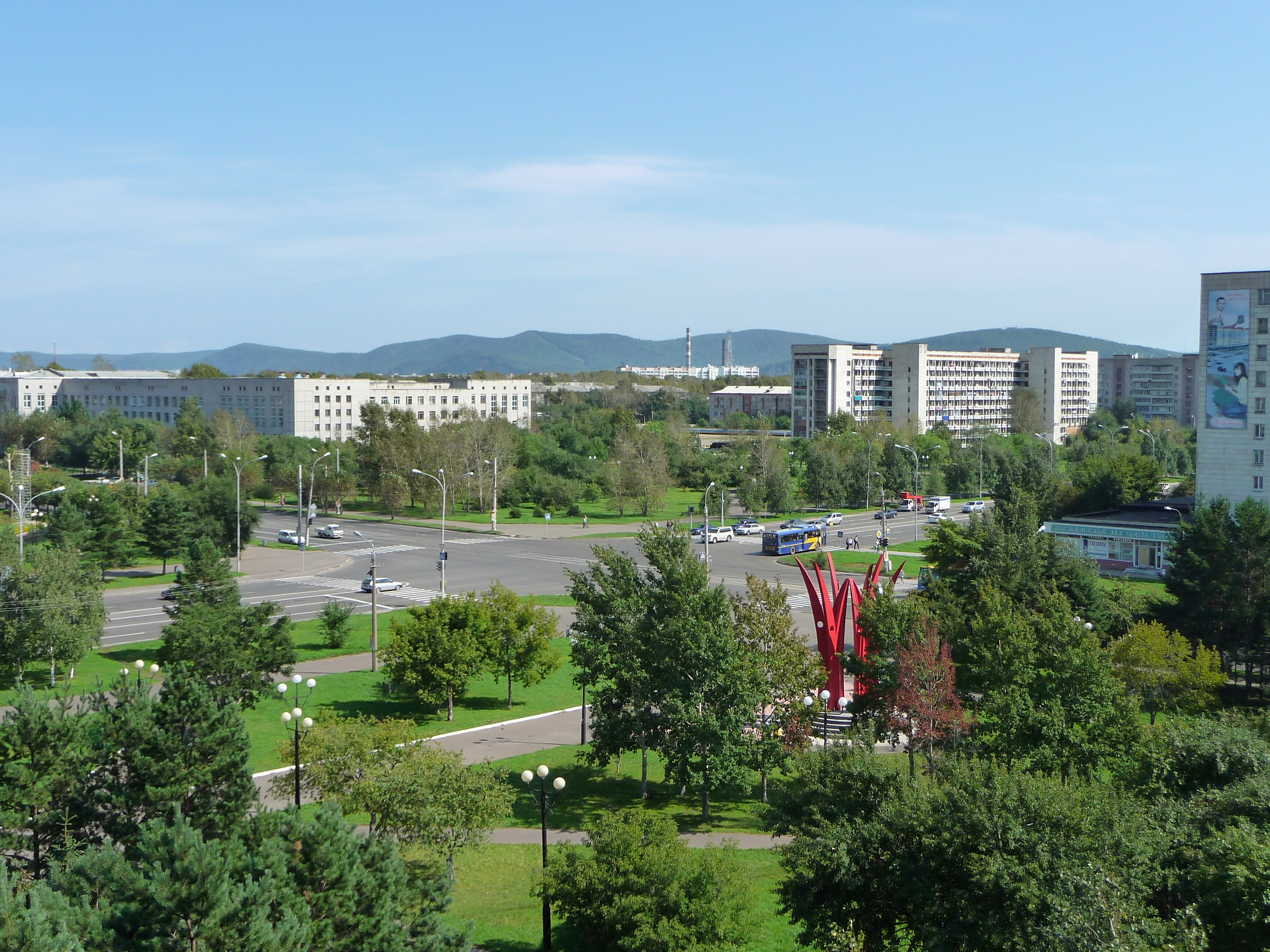
- View of Komsomolsk-on-Amur

- Flag Coat of arms
- Interactive map of Komsomolsk-on-Amur
- Location of Komsomolsk-on-Amur Komsomolsk-on-Amur (Khabarovsk Krai)
- Coordinates: 50°34′N 137°00′E
- Country: Russia
- Federal subject: Khabarovsk Krai
- Founded: 1932
- City status since: 1933

Government
  - Head: Alexander Viktorovich Zhornik

Area
  - Total: 325.10 km^{2} (125.52 sq mi)
- Elevation: 47 m (154 ft)

Population (2010 Census)
  - Total: 263,906
  - Estimate (2025): 233,716 (−11.4%)
  - Rank: 70th in 2010
  - Density: 811.77/km^{2} (2,102.5/sq mi)

Administrative status
  - Subordinated to: city of krai significance of Komsomolsk-na-Amure
  - Capital of: city of krai significance of Komsomolsk-na-Amure, Komsomolsky District

Municipal status
  - Urban okrug: Komsomolsk-na-Amure Urban Okrug
  - Capital of: Komsomolsk-na-Amure Urban Okrug, Komsomolsky Municipal District
- Time zone: UTC+10 (MSK+7)
- Postal code: 6810xx
- Dialing code: +7 4217
- OKTMO ID: 08709000001
- Website: www.kmscity.ru

Komsomolsk-on-Amur (Russian: Комсомольск-на-Амуре, romanized: Komsomolsk-na-Amure, IPA: [kəmsɐˈmolʲsk nɐ‿ɐˈmurʲə]) is the second-largest city in Khabarovsk Krai, Russia, located on the west bank of the Amur River in the Russian Far East. It is located on the Baikal-Amur Mainline, 356 kilometers (221 mi) northeast of Khabarovsk. Population: 238,505 (2021 census); 263,906 (2010 census); 281,035 (2002 census); 315,325 (1989 Soviet census).

Historical population
Year	Pop.	±%
1939	70,808	—
1959	177,278	+150.4%
1970	218,127	+23.0%
1979	263,950	+21.0%
1989	315,325	+19.5%
2002	281,035	−10.9%
2010	263,906	−6.1%
2021	238,505	−9.6%
Source: Census data

== History ==
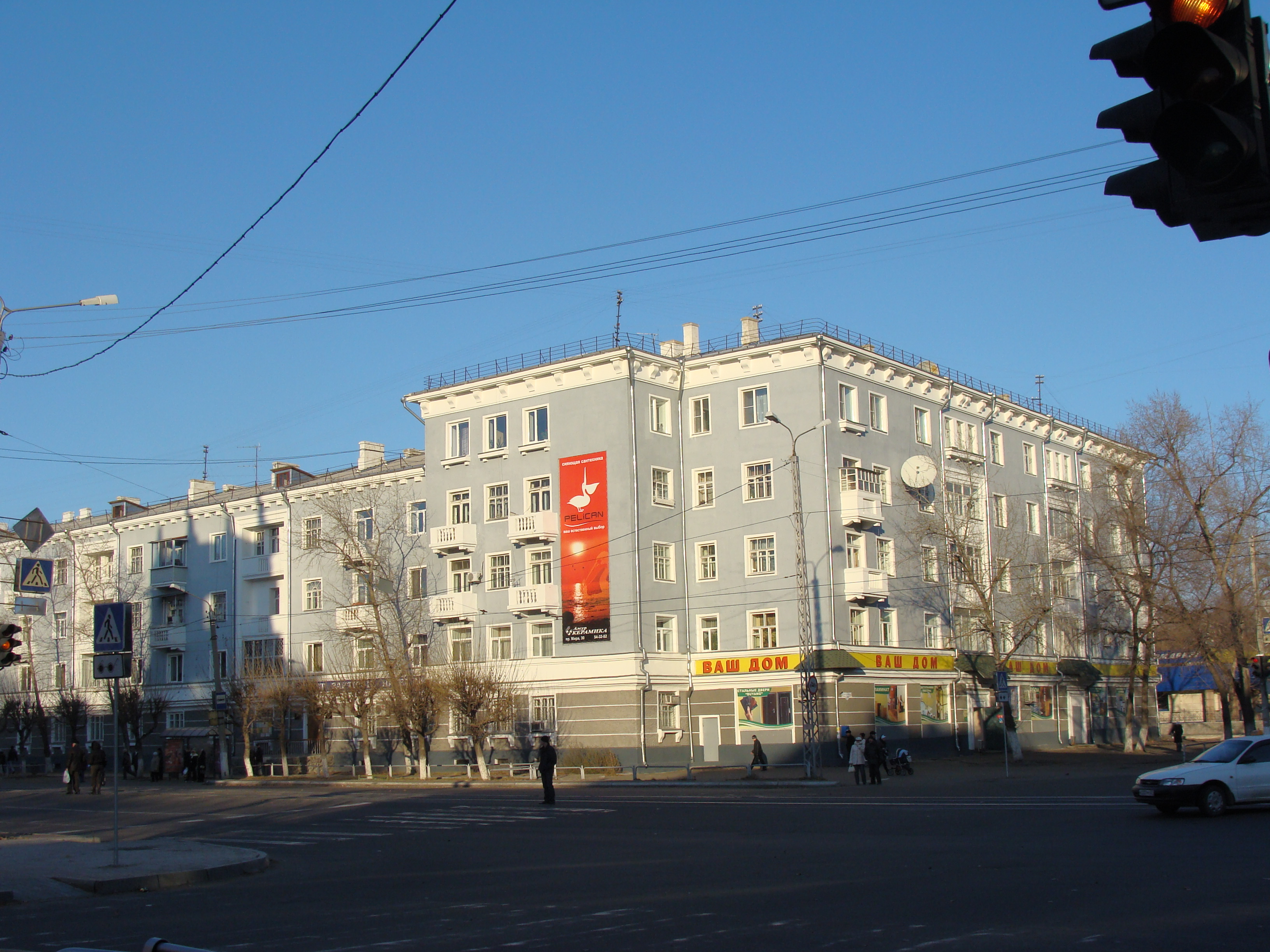
A street in Komsomolsk-on-Amur

The future site of Komsomolsk-on-Amur was conquered by the Mongols in the 13th century, becoming part of the Yuan dynasty. It was later held by the Qing dynasty until the area was ceded to the Russian Empire in the treaty of Aigun in 1858. The village of Permskoye (Пе́рмское) was established on the later site of Komsomolsk in 1860 by migrant peasants from what was then called the Nizhne-Tambovsky District, Far Eastern Territory (now Khabarovsk Krai).

The government of the Russian SFSR announced in 1931 plans to construct a shipyard on the Amur at the present site of Komsomolsk, with construction beginning in 1932. According to official accounts, the town was built using volunteer labor from the Communist youth organization Komsomol (and after 1991, the Russian Communist Youth League), and on that basis receiving the name Komsomolsk. However, the construction of the town was done with the extensive use of forced labour from the concentration camps under the Gulag administration, specifically the Dallag (Far East Camp) complex. The site had been the centre of the system for the Khabarovsk krai. According to Adashova and Kovalev, there was not a single entreprise constructed there in the 1930s or 1940s which had not involved Dallag forced labour, and at least 900,000 forced labourers passed through the area throughout its existence. The suffix on Amur was added to differentiate from other towns with the same name. It was granted town status in 1933.

By the end of the 1940s, the shipyards along with facilities for other heavy industry had been completed. The city developed into a regional center for industries such as aircraft manufacturing, metallurgy, machinery, oil refining, and shipbuilding. At present, Komsomolsk-on-Amur is the main center for the manufacture of Sukhoi military aircraft and the Sukhoi Superjet airliner. The MiG-15bis and the Lisunov Li-2 were both manufactured in Komsomolsk-on-Amur.

== Administrative and municipal status ==
Within the framework of administrative divisions, Komsomolsk-on-Amur serves as the administrative center of Komsomolsky District, even though it is not a part of it. As an administrative division, it is incorporated separately as the city of krai significance of Komsomolsk-na-Amure—an administrative unit with the status equal to that of the districts. As a municipal division, the city of krai significance of Komsomolsk-na-Amure is incorporated as Komsomolsk-na-Amure Urban Okrug. The city is administratively divided into 2 okrugs (previously raion), coinciding with the historical parts: Leninsky (Dzemgi) and Central.

In the Soviet period, the administrative-territorial division of the city was different from the present. In accordance with the Decree of the Presidium of the Supreme Soviet of the RSFSR of 19 October 1943 were formed Lenin, Stalin and Central areas. Stalinsky district included the territory of Railway Amurstali and residential community.

"On the Abolition of the city of Komsomolsk-on-Amur, Khabarovsk Krai" by the Presidium of the Supreme Soviet of the RSFSR on August 7, 1957 abolished the district division. However, a decree of March 31, 1972 by the Presidium of the Supreme Soviet redivided the city into two districts – Central and Leninsky.

== Geography ==
The city and its suburbs stretch for over 30 kilometers (19 mi) along the left bank of the Amur River. The river at this point is up to 2.5 kilometers (1.6 mi) wide. Lake Khummi is located southeast of the city.

The distance to Khabarovsk – the administrative center of the krai – is 356 kilometers (221 mi), and to the Sea of Okhotsk it is about 300 kilometers (190 mi). The nearest other major town is Amursk, about 45 kilometers (28 mi) south.

It is about 3,900 miles (6,300 km) east of Moscow, and lies at the eastern end of the BAM Railway.

=== Climate ===
Komsomolsk-on-Amur has an extreme humid continental climate (Köppen Dfb), featuring warm summers and bitterly cold winters. Temperatures in the area of the city typically change by over 56 °C (100.8 °F) over the course of the year, with a daily average of −24.7 °C (−12.5 °F) in January, compared to +20.3 °C (68.5 °F) in July. This city has exceptionally cold winter temperatures for its latitude of 51 degrees N, which is about the same as that of London. In fact, Komsomolsk's winter temperatures are more similar to Norilsk than to London, although its summers are marginally hotter than London's.

Climate data for Komsomolsk-on-Amur
Month	Jan	Feb	Mar	Apr	May	Jun	Jul	Aug	Sep	Oct	Nov	Dec	Year
Record high °C (°F)	0.7 (33.3)	0.0 (32.0)	13.6 (56.5)	23.9 (75.0)	31.0 (87.8)	33.2 (91.8)	36.2 (97.2)	38.0 (100.4)	30.0 (86.0)	20.5 (68.9)	8.3 (46.9)	1.0 (33.8)	38.0 (100.4)
Mean daily maximum °C (°F)	−19.6 (−3.3)	−13.9 (7.0)	−4.0 (24.8)	7.5 (45.5)	16.1 (61.0)	22.8 (73.0)	25.1 (77.2)	23.4 (74.1)	17.1 (62.8)	7.4 (45.3)	−6.4 (20.5)	−17.2 (1.0)	4.6 (40.3)
Daily mean °C (°F)	−24.7 (−12.5)	−19.8 (−3.6)	−9.5 (14.9)	2.3 (36.1)	10.4 (50.7)	17.3 (63.1)	20.3 (68.5)	18.5 (65.3)	11.9 (53.4)	2.5 (36.5)	−10.5 (13.1)	−21.8 (−7.2)	−0.6 (30.9)
Mean daily minimum °C (°F)	−30.8 (−23.4)	−27.2 (−17.0)	−17.1 (1.2)	−3.4 (25.9)	3.7 (38.7)	10.8 (51.4)	15.2 (59.4)	13.5 (56.3)	6.4 (43.5)	−2.9 (26.8)	−16.1 (3.0)	−27.4 (−17.3)	−6.6 (20.1)
Record low °C (°F)	−47.0 (−52.6)	−42.0 (−43.6)	−33.9 (−29.0)	−20.8 (−5.4)	−7.5 (18.5)	−2.2 (28.0)	0.0 (32.0)	−8.9 (16.0)	−6.0 (21.2)	−22.0 (−7.6)	−34.0 (−29.2)	−42.0 (−43.6)	−47.0 (−52.6)
Average precipitation mm (inches)	30 (1.2)	19 (0.7)	30 (1.2)	43 (1.7)	63 (2.5)	65 (2.6)	95 (3.7)	110 (4.3)	74 (2.9)	62 (2.4)	49 (1.9)	32 (1.3)	672 (26.4)
Average precipitation days	14	12	13	15	15	13	15	14	14	13	16	15	169
Average rainy days	0	0	1	7	14	13	15	14	14	8	1	0	87
Average snowy days	14	12	13	11	3	0	0	0	0	8	15	15	91
Source 1: climatebase.ru
Source 2: Weatherbase

== Layout ==
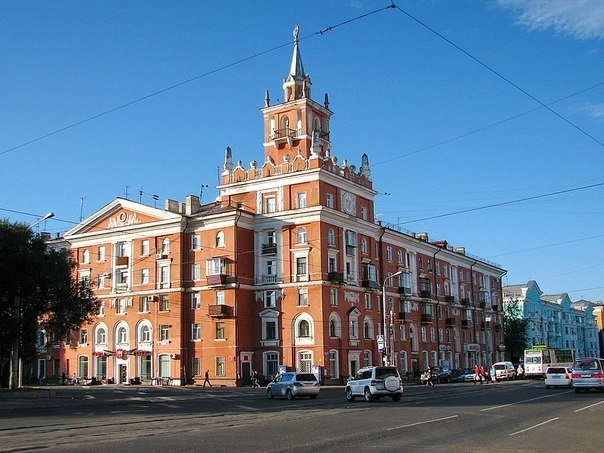
"House with a spire" – unofficial symbol of Komsomolsk-on-Amur

Komsomolsk-on-Amur consists of two historical parts:

1. the center, or "city", where the main enterprise is Shipyard
2. the Dzemgi, an area that has formed during the construction of an aircraft factory (future = KnAAPO).

Each of the parts is actually a separate town, and areas of the city have very different architectural appearances. Center Stalinist buildings dominated the 1940–1950s, except the residential area near the railway station. Dzemgi is built up mainly of typical panel apartment blocks, and the majority of Dzemgi's residents work in enterprises located there.

== Economy and infrastructure ==
Komsomolsk-on-Amur is an important industrial center of Khabarovsk Krai and of the Russian Far East. It has a diversified economy where machine building, metallurgy and timber enterprises dominate.

The city's most notable company is Komsomolsk-on-Amur Aircraft Production Association, Russia's largest aircraft-manufacturing enterprise. It is among Khabarovsk Krai's most successful enterprises, and for years has been the largest taxpayer of the territory. It has manufactured hundreds of civil aircraft and thousands of various-role military aircraft from the first recon aircraft to modern Su- series fighters and light amphibian aeroplanes. The company is hugely important to the city's economy, contributing 45% of all payments into the local budget.

Also based in the city is Amur Shipbuilding Plant, an important producer of ships and submarines.

The easternmost GLONASS telemetry and tracking station is located in Komsomolsk-on-Amur.

Two air bases are located near the city, Khurba to the south and Dzemgi to the north.

Komsomolsk-on-Amur railway station is an important rail junction of Baikal-Amur Mainline and Komsomolsk-Dezhnyovka railway line.

The city is served by the Komsomolsk-on-Amur Airport.

Public transport includes five tram routes, bus and fixed-taxi (marshrutka). However, since January 10, 2018 the tram has not been operated, due to 'poor road condition' on Mira Prospect. It has yet to reopen and it was speculated that the suspension of tram traffic might become permanent.

The first sortie of the Sukhoi Su-57 prototype occurred at the Gagarin Factory.

The Komsomolsk Oil Refinery receives West Siberian crude via the Transneft pipeline.

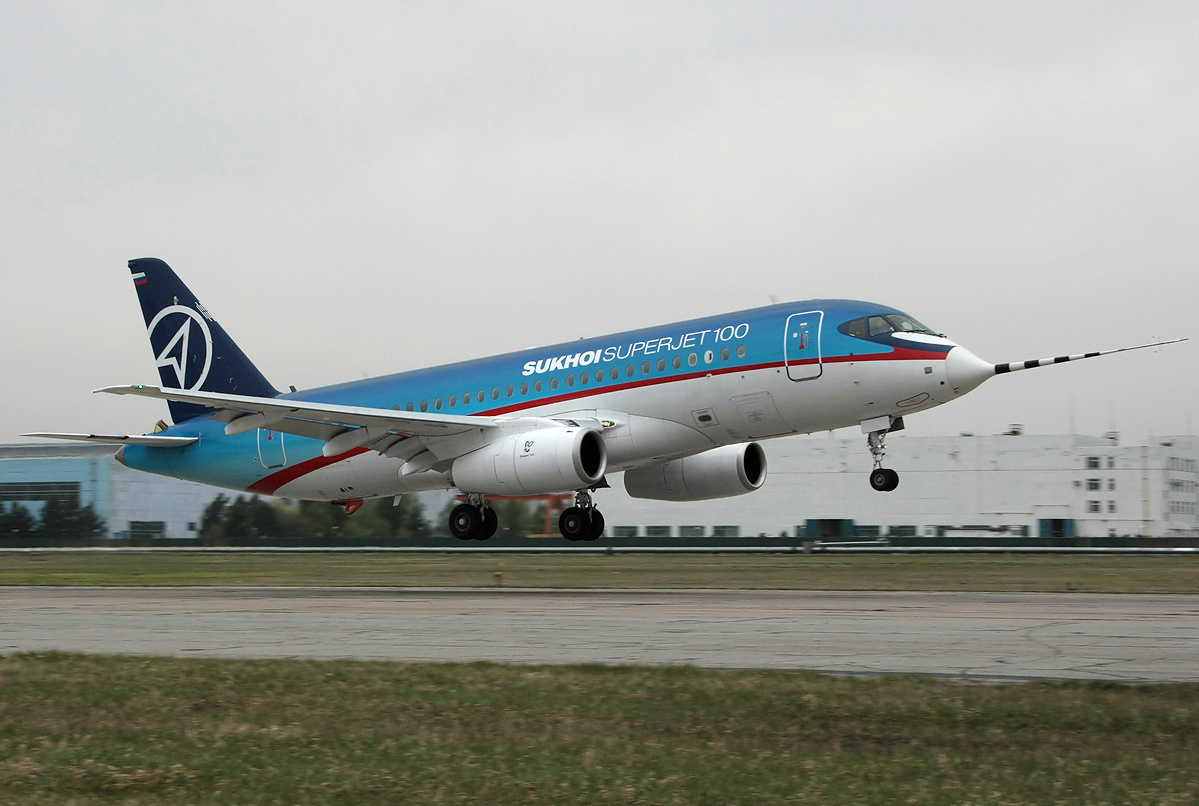
Test flight of a Sukhoi Superjet 100 prototype in Komsomolsk-on-Amur

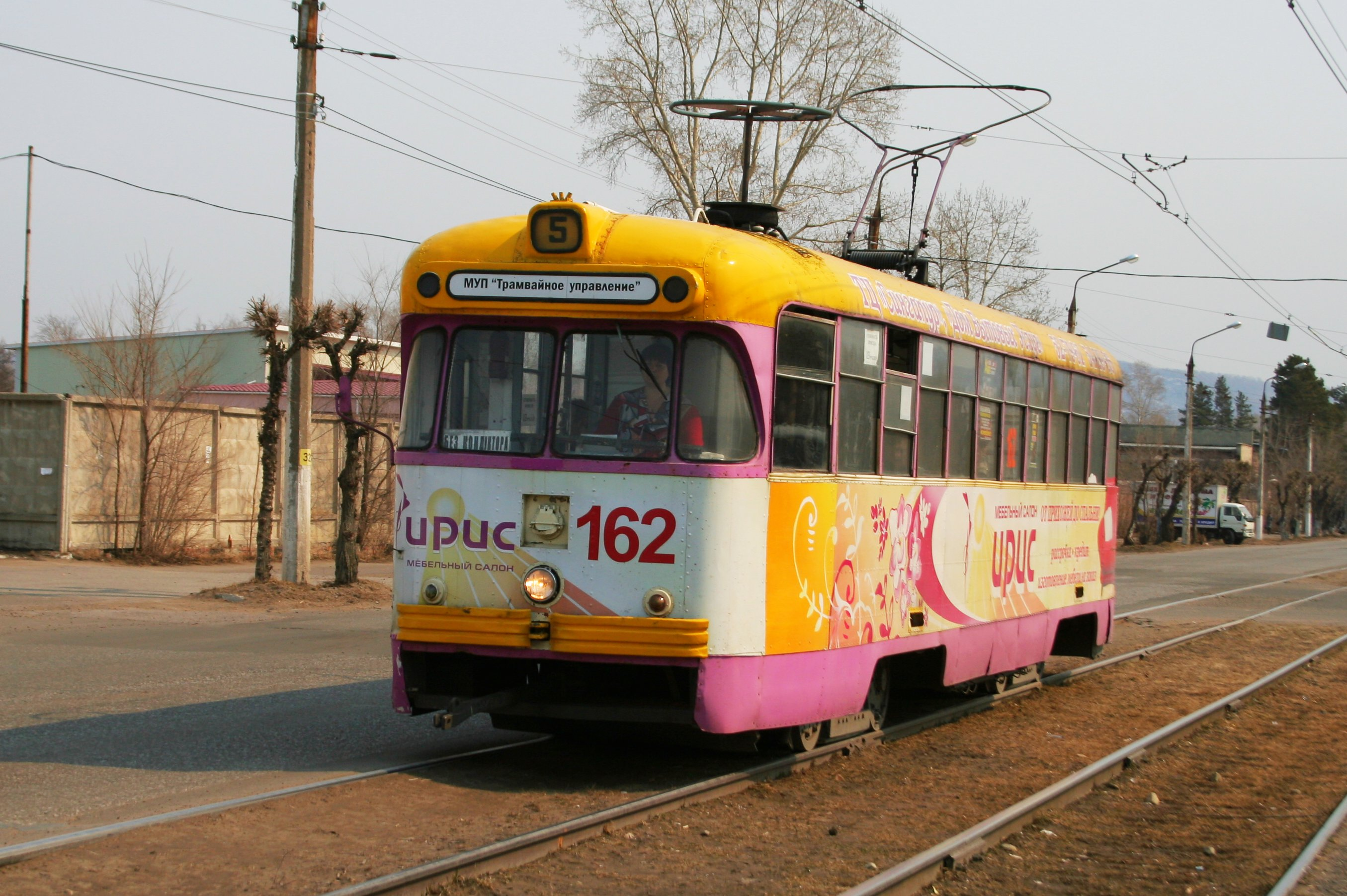
Tram

== Twin towns – sister cities ==
Komsomolsk-on-Amur is twinned with:

- Jiamusi, China (1994)
- Kamo, Japan (1991)
- Weinan, China (2016)

== Notable residents ==
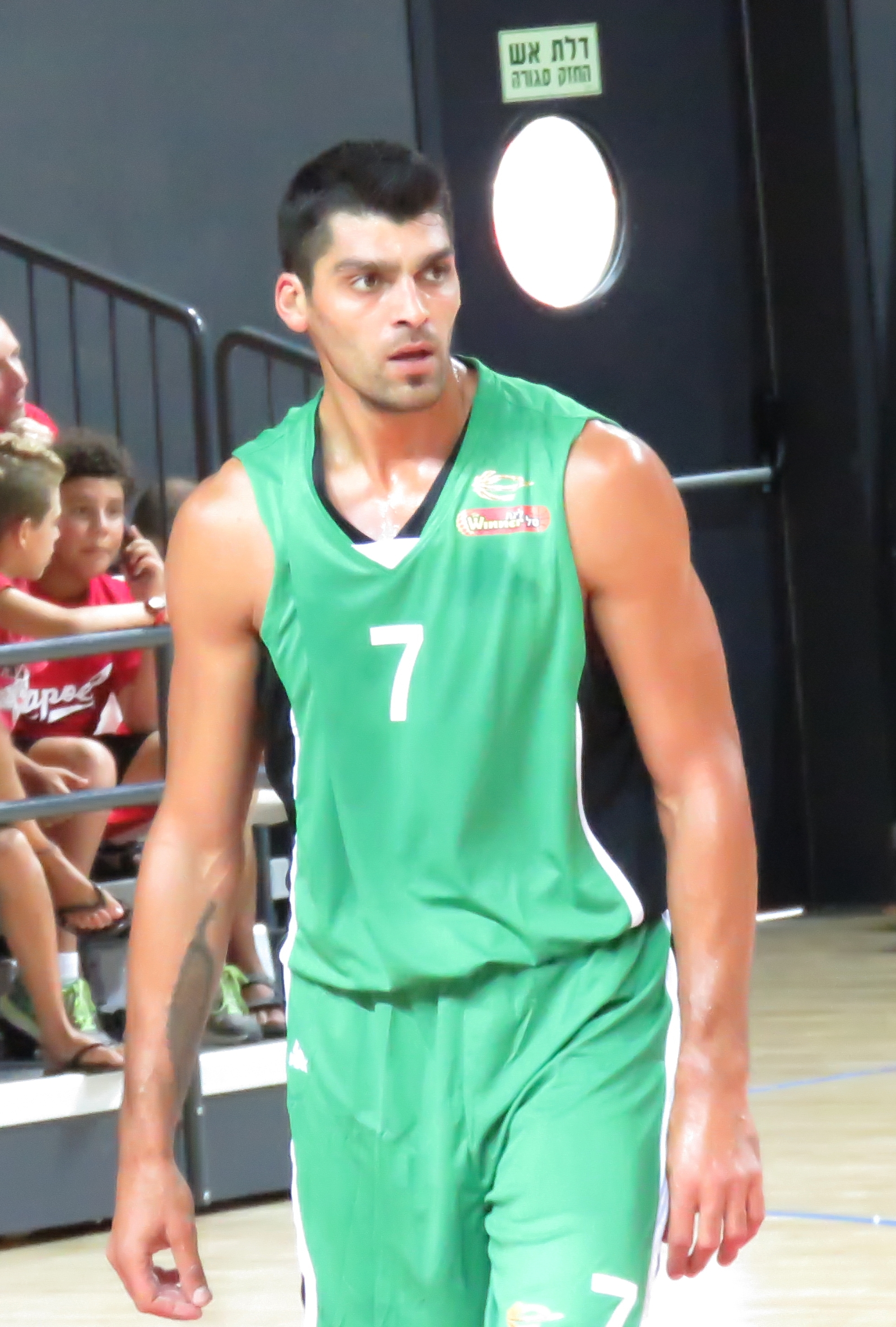
Alex Chubrevich

- Alex Chubrevich (born 1986), Israeli-Russian professional basketball player for Maccabi Haifa of the Israeli Super League.
- Yuliya Chepalova (born 1976), cross-country skier.
- Anatoly Dyatlov (1931–1995), deputy chief-engineer of the Chernobyl Nuclear Power Plant
- Yury Gazinsky (born 1989), footballer, scorer of the first goal at the 2018 FIFA World Cup, was born in the city
- Alexandra Ivanovskaya (born 1989), "Miss Russia 2005"
- Valentina Khetagurova (1914–1992), founder of the Khetagurovite Campaign
- Pasha Kovalev (born 1980), professional dancer
- Sergei Plotnikov (born 1990), ice hockey player with SKA Saint Petersburg, KHL
- Ivan Shtyl (born 1986), sprint canoer

== See also ==
- Komsomolsk-on-Amur road-rail bridge
