= 3rd Guards Army =

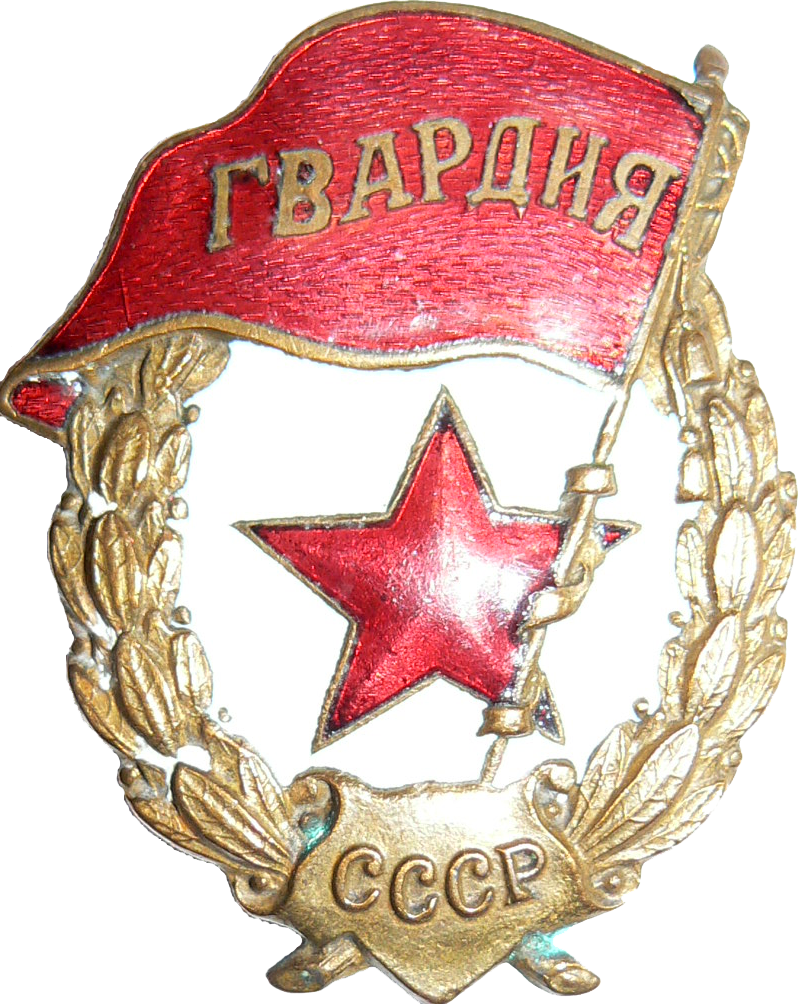
- Active: December 1942 – 1945
- Country: Soviet Union
- Branch: Red Army, Soviet Army
- Size: two or more Rifle corps
- Part of: 1st Ukrainian Front, others
- Engagements: World War II; Operation Little Saturn; Operation Winter Storm; Operation Gallop; Donbas Strategic Offensive; Nikopol–Krivoi Rog offensive; Lvov–Sandomierz offensive; Sandomierz–Silesian offensive; Battle of Berlin

The 3rd Guards Army (Russian: 3-я гвардейская армия) was a field army of the Soviet Red Army that fought on the Eastern Front in World War II.

The army fought in the Battle of Berlin, during which it mopped up German resistance around Cottbus.

== 1942 to 1945 ==
It was formed on December 5, 1942 by the redesignation of the 1st Guards Army (Second formation), in accordance with a Stavka order dated the same day, as part of the Southwestern Front. Lieutenant General Dmitry Lelyushenko was appointed to command the formation, and held the reins until March 1943 (and subsequently from August 1943 to February 1944). Up to the middle of December the army comprised the 14th Rifle Corps, 50th Guards, 197th, 203rd and 278th Rifle Divisions, 90th and 94th Separate Rifle Brigades, the 1st Guards Mechanized Corps, the 22nd Motor Rifle Brigade and three separate tank regiments. It began combat operations during Operation Little Saturn in mid-December, defeating German troops on the Middle Don and frustrating Operation Winter Storm, a German attempt to relieve the 6th Army trapped in the Stalingrad Pocket created by the Soviet counteroffensive in the Battle of Stalingrad, Operation Uranus. During January and February 1943, it fought in the Operation Gallop, then defended the line of the Donets. Major General Georgy Khetagurov held command from March to August.

In the summer and fall, the 3rd Guards Army fought in the Donbass Strategic Offensive, then in the Zaporizhia Offensive in October. During the latter, the army broke through heavily fortified German defenses and captured Zaporizhia alongside the 8th Guards Army on October 14, eliminating a German bridgehead on the left bank of the Dnieper. Towards the end of the year, the army joined the 4th Ukrainian Front, participating in fierce fighting to eliminate the Nikopol bridgehead. During the Nikopol–Krivoi Rog Offensive in January and February 1944, the army crossed the Dnieper and captured Nikopol alongside the 3rd Ukrainian Front's 6th Army on February 8.

3rd Guards Army was assigned in succession to the Soviet Southwestern Front, 3rd, 4th and since March 1944 the First Ukrainian Front led by Marshal Ivan Konev. After a brief stint under the command of Lieutenant General Dmitry Ryabyshev in February and March 1944, from April 1944 to the end of the war in Europe Colonel General Vasily Gordov was in command. The Army participated in the Middle Don and Voroshilovgrad offensive operations, the defensive battles on the northern Donets River, in the Donbass and Zaporozhye offensive operations, in the liquidation of the Germans' Nikopol bridgehead, in the Nikopol - Krivoi Rog and Proskurov - Chernovits operations, the Lvov-Sandomierz Offensive, the Sandomierz–Silesian Offensive, and the Battle of Berlin.

== Battle of Berlin ==
In the First Ukrainian Front's attack from the Neisse River into Saxony and the Brandenburg area, the 3rd Guards Army attacked north of Cottbus into the Spree River. Part of it also attacked Cottbus and captured it. However, the 3rd Guards Army did not head north into the southern suburbs of Berlin. Koniev had angled the 5th Guards Army left towards Spremberg and the 3rd Guards Army to the right to force the German troops back into Cottbus. A few days after the great Soviet offensive of April 16, the 3rd Guards Army kept the pressure on the Germans around Cottbus.

Konev was warned of the mass of German troops in the Spreewald. He expedited the 28th Army's advance that was intended to seal the gap between the 3rd Guards Army, effectively finishing off the Germans in the Cottbus area, and the 3rd Guards Tank Army. On April 25, when the First Belorussian Front was fighting in the city itself during the Battle of Berlin, the 3rd Guards Army was rushed into positions close to the Berlin-Dresden autobahn "to block all the forest roads leading from east to west." Gordov's troops chopped down tall pine trees to form tank barriers. However, the 3rd Guards Army did not manage to occupy the southern part of its sector, which meant that there was a gap between it and the 28th Army. However, that did not matter that much since German resistance in eastern Germany was now very limited, as the Ninth and Twelfth Armies were retreating towards the Elbe River, and resistance was limited to small pockets of concentration.

After the Berlin operation, the Army formed part of the Soviet force for the Prague Offensive.

== Postwar ==
The 3rd Guards Army briefly became part of the Central Group of Forces when it was formed on 10 June 1945. At that time, it included the 21st Rifle Corps with the 149th, 197th, and 253rd Rifle Divisions, the 76th Rifle Corps with the 58th, 127th, and 389th Rifle Divisions, and the 120th Rifle Corps with the 54th, 287th, and 329th Rifle Divisions. The same Stavka order that established the group ordered the disbandment of the army's three rifle corps and all nine of its divisions, a process completed by July. Its headquarters was soon transferred to become the headquarters of the reorganised Volga Military District on 30 July.

== Commanders ==
- Lieutenant General Dmitry Lelyushenko (December 1942 — March 1943)
- Guard Major General Georgy Khetagurov (March — August 1943)
- Lieutenant General Dmitry Lelyushenko (August 1943 — February 1944)
- Lieutenant General Dmitry Ryabyshev (February - March 1944)
- Colonel General Vasily Gordov (April 1944 — end of War)
