= Valentina Khetagurova =

Soviet activist

- Валентина Семёновна Хетагурова
- Born: 1914; St. Petersburg, Russian Empire
- Died: 1992 (aged 77–78); Russia
- Resting place: Novodevichy Cemetery
- Known for: Khetagurova movement
- Spouse: Georgy Khetagurov

Valentina Semyonovna Khetagurova (Russian: Валентина Семёновна Хетагурова; 1914–1992), was a founder of the Khetagurova movement (Khetagurovite Campaign), a member of the Supreme Soviet of the Soviet Union for the Russian Far East.

== Biography ==
Valentina Zarubina was born in St. Petersburg in 1914. In 1932, when she was seventeen, she enlisted to work on the De-Kastri Fortified district in the Far Eastern Federal District, where she worked as a draughtswoman. There, she became the leader of the Komsomol cell, and became involved in the fight against illiteracy and in organizing the weekly day off. Working with the women in the cell, she helped to improve daily life, including the soldiers' food and arranging leisure activities. In 1936, for her work in Siberia, she was awarded with the Order of the Red Banner of Labour. She was awarded a gold watch by Kliment Voroshilov, the People's Commissioner for Defense of the USSR. The following year she was elected to the Supreme Soviet of the Soviet Union.

Khetagurova died in 1992. She is buried in Moscow in the Novodevichy Cemetery.

== Khetagurovite Campaign ==
In 1937, Khetagurova wrote a letter to the newspaper Komsomolskaya Pravda calling for women to volunteer to work in the Far East. During the construction of Komsomolsk-on-Amur, the population included 6,000 male workers for every 30 women. When it was completed there were 300 men to every 3 women. Thousands of women responded to Khetagurova's call, and the movement was known as Хетагуровское движение (Khetagourovskoe dviznenie, lit. 'Khetagurovite Campaign'), and the members of the movement were known as Хетагуровски (khetagourovki, lit. 'khetagurovites'). By the autumn of 1937, approximately 11,500 women arrived in the Far East.

== Personal life ==
Khetagurova married the commander of the Red Army Georgy Khetagurov. She had 3 children.

== Legacy ==
In 1937, Yevgeny Petrov wrote Young Patriots, devoted to Khetagurova and the movement she organized. Isaak Dunayevsky wrote a song dedicated to the Khetagurova movement and movement appears in a poem by Yevgeniy Dolmatovsky. A street in the town of Komsomolsk-on-Amur bears her name.
