= Group of Soviet Forces in Germany =

Formation of the Soviet Army formerly stationed in East Germany

Group of Soviet Occupation Forces in Germany (1945–1954); Group of Soviet Forces in Germany (1954–1989); Western Group of Forces (1989–1994)
- Soviet Army marking present on GSFG vehicles
- Active: 1945–1994
- Country: Soviet Union (1945–1991); Commonwealth of Independent States (1991–1992); Russia (1992–1994)
- Branch: Soviet Armed Forces; United Armed Forces of the Commonwealth of Independent States; Russian Armed Forces
- Type: Group of forces
- Part of: People's Commissariat, from 1946 Ministry of Defence of the Soviet Union; Council of Defence Ministers of the Commonwealth of Independent States; Ministry of Defence of Russia
- Headquarters: Wünsdorf (now in Zossen)
- Engagements: East German uprising of 1953

Commanders
- Notable commanders: See list

The Group of Soviet Forces in Germany (GSFG), (Note: Russian: Группа советских войск в Германии, ГСВГ, romanized: Gruppa sovetskikh voysk v Germanii, GSVG; German: Gruppe der Sowjetischen Truppen in Deutschland, GSTD) known as the Group of Soviet Occupation Forces in Germany (GSOFG) (Note: Russian: Группа советских оккупационных войск в Германии, ГСОВГ, romanized: Gruppa sovetskikh okkupatsionnykh voysk v Germanii, GSOVG; German: Gruppe der Sowjetischen Besatzungstruppen in Deutschland, GSBTD) from 1945 to 1954 and the Western Group of Forces (WGF) (Note: Russian: Западная группа войск, ЗГВ, romanized: Zapadnaya gruppa voysk, ZGV; German: Westgruppe der Truppen, WGT) from 1989 to 1994 were the troops of the Soviet Army in East Germany. The Group of Soviet Occupation Forces in Germany was formed after the end of World War II in Europe from units of the 1st and 2nd Belorussian Fronts. The group helped suppress the East German uprising of 1953. After the end of occupation functions in 1954 the group was renamed the Group of Soviet Forces in Germany. The group represented Soviet interests in East Germany during the Cold War. Before changes in Soviet foreign policy during the early 1990s, the group shifted to a more offensive role and in 1989 became the Western Group of Forces. They remained in the eastern part of Germany after the dissolution of the Soviet Union and German reunification until 1994.

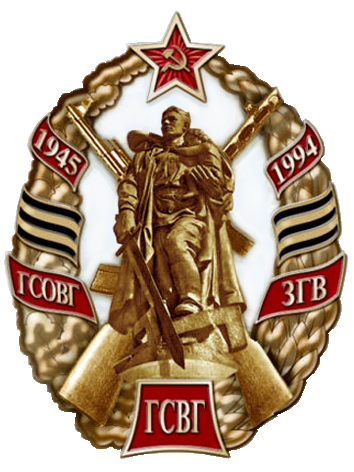
Commemorative medal, Group of Soviet Forces in Germany 1945–1994

== History ==
Period	Native designation		German		English	
Period	Short	Long version	Short	Long version	Short	Long version
1945–1954	ГСОВГ, GSOVG	Группа советских оккупационных войск в Германии, Gruppa sovetskikh okkupatsionnykh voysk v Germanii	GSBTD	Gruppe der Sowjetischen Besatzungstruppen in Deutschland	GSOFG	Group of Soviet Occupation Forces in Germany
1954–1989	ГСВГ, GSVG	Группа советских войск в Германии, Gruppa sovetskikh voysk v Germanii	GSTD	Gruppe der Sowjetischen Truppen in Deutschland	GSFG	Group of Soviet Forces in Germany
1989–1994	ЗГВ, ZGV	Западная группа войск, Zapadnaya gruppa voysk	WGT	Westgruppe der Truppen	WGF	Western Group of Forces

The Group of Soviet Occupation Forces, Germany was formed after the end of World War II in Europe from formations of the 1st and 2nd Belorussian Fronts, commanded by Georgy Zhukov. On its creation on 9 June 1945 it included:

- 1st Guards Tank Army (HQ Radebeul)
  - 8th Guards Mechanised Corps
  - 11th Guards Tank Corps
- 2nd Guards Tank Army (HQ Fürstenberg)
  - Soviet 1st Mechanized Corps
  - 9th Tank Corps
  - 12th Guards Tank Corps
- 4th Guards Tank Army (HQ Eberswalde)
  - 5th Guards Mechanised Corps
  - 6th Guards Mechanised Corps
  - 10th Guards Tank Corps
- 2nd Shock Army (HQ Goldberg, then Schwerin)
  - 109th Rifle Corps (46th, 90th, 372nd Rifle Divisions)
  - 116th Rifle Corps (86th, 321st, 326th Rifle Division)
  - 40th Guards Rifle Corps (101st Guards, 102nd Guards, 272nd Rifle Division)
- 3rd Shock Army (HQ Stendal)
  - 7th Rifle Corps (146th, 265th, 364th Rifle Divisions)
  - 12th Guards Rifle Corps (23rd Guards, 52nd Guards, 33rd Rifle Divisions)
  - 79th Rifle Corps (150th, 171st, 207th Rifle Divisions)
  - 9th Tank Corps
- 5th Shock Army (HQ Nauen, then Potsdam)
  - 9th Rifle Corps (248th, 301st Rifle Divisions)
  - 26th Guards Rifle Corps (89th Guards, 94th Guards, 266th Rifle Divisions)
  - 32nd Rifle Corps (60th Guards, 295th, 416th Rifle Divisions)
  - 230th Rifle Division
  - three independent tank brigades
- 8th Guards Army (HQ Jena, then Nohra)
  - 4th Guards Rifle Corps (35th, 47th, 57th Guard Rifle Divisions)
  - 28th Guards Rifle Corps (39th, 79th, 88th Guards Rifle Divisions)
  - 29th Guards Rifle Corps (27th, 74th, 82nd Guards Rifle Divisions)
  - 11th Tank Corps
- 47th Army (HQ Eisleben, then Halle)
  - 77th Rifle Corps (185th, 260th, 328th Rifle Division)
  - 125th Rifle Corps (60th, 76th, 175th Rifle Divisions)
  - 129th Rifle Corps (82nd, 132nd, 143rd Rifle Divisions)
  - 1st Guards Tank Corps
  - 25th Tank Corps
- 49th Army (HQ Wittenberg)
- 70th Army (HQ Rostock)
- First Polish Army (two divisions)
- Dnieper Flotilla
- 16th Air Army (HQ Woltersdorf)

The 4th Artillery Corps also became part of the GSFG in 1945.

An order of 29 May 1945 had ordered the disestablishment of the 16th, 25th, 47th, 38th, 61st, 62nd, 70th, 77th, 80th, 89th, 91st, 114th Rifle Corps, and 121st Rifle Corps, and of the 71st, 136th, 162nd, 76th, 82nd, 212th, 356th, 234th, 23rd, 397th, 311th, 415th, 328th, 274th, 370th, 41st, 134th, 312th, 4th, 117th, 247th, 89th, 95th, 64th, 323rd, 362nd, 222nd, 49th, 339th, 383rd, 191st, 380th, 42nd, 139th, 238th, 385th, 200th, 330th, 199th, 1st, 369th, 165th, 169th, 158th, and 346th Rifle Divisions. The 89th Rifle Division was not disbanded and instead transferred to the Caucasus.

In January 1946, the 2nd Shock Army left the Soviet Zone. A month later, the 47th Army was disbanded, with its units withdrawn to the Soviet Union. In October the 5th Shock Army was disbanded. In 1947 the 3rd and 4th Guards Mechanized Divisions (Mobilization), former mechanized armies, arrived in the group from the Central Group of Forces. In 1954 the 3rd Shock Army became the 3rd Red Banner Combined Arms Army (Russian: 3-я краснознаменная общевойсковая армия). The 3rd Guards Mechanized Army became the 18th Guards Army on 29 April 1957. On the same day, the 4th Guards Mechanized Army became the 20th Guards Army.

After the abolition of the occupation functions in 1954, the Group of Soviet Occupation Forces in Germany became known as the Group of Soviet Forces in Germany (GSVG) on 24 March. The legal basis for the GSVG's stay in East Germany was the Treaty on Relations between the USSR and the GDR of 1955.

Withdrawals from East Germany in 1956 and 1957/58 comprised more than 70,000 Soviet army personnel, including 18th Guards Army Staff.

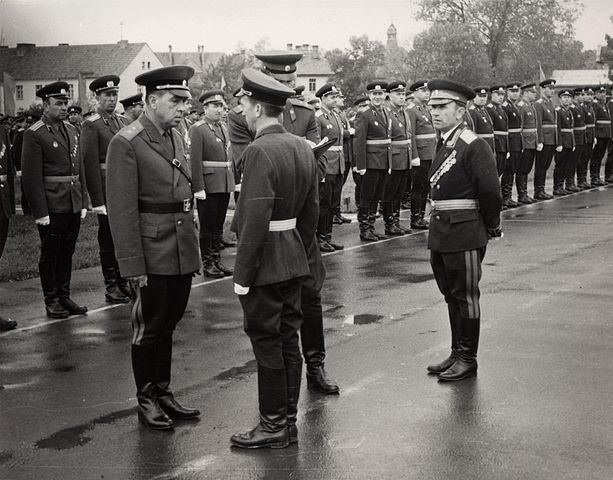
Inspection of 39th Guards Motor Rifle Division, 1968.

The GSFG had the task to ensure for the adherence to the regulations of the Potsdam Agreement. Furthermore, they represented the political and military interests of the Soviet Union. In 1957 an agreement between the governments of the USSR and the GDR laid out the arrangements over the temporary stay of Soviet armed forces on the territory of the GDR, the numerical strength of the Soviet troops, and their assigned posts and exercise areas. It was specified that the Soviet armed forces were not to interfere into the internal affairs of the GDR, as they had done during the East German uprising of 1953.

Following a resolution of the government of the Soviet Union in 1979 and 1980, 20,000 army personnel, 1,000 tanks and much equipment were withdrawn from the territory of the GDR, among them the 6th Guards Tank Division, with headquarters at Wittenberg.

Organization as of 1988.

Until the last years of Perestroika the GSFG was in the process of realignment as a more offensive force regarding strength, structure and equipment, before a clear reduction of the tank forces in 1989. The GSFG was renamed the Western Group of Forces on 1 June 1989. The withdrawal of the GSFG was one of the largest peacetime troop transfers in military history. Despite the difficulties, which resulted from the dissolution of the Soviet Union in the same period, the departure was carried out according to plan and punctually until August 1994. Between the years of 1992 and 1993, the Western Group of Forces in Germany (along with the Northern Group of Forces) halted military exercises.

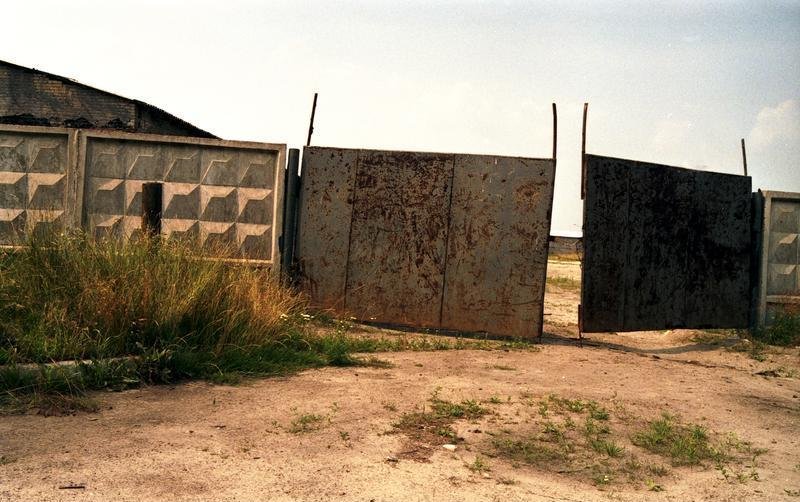
Abandoned Soviet Army barracks in Stendal, 1991.

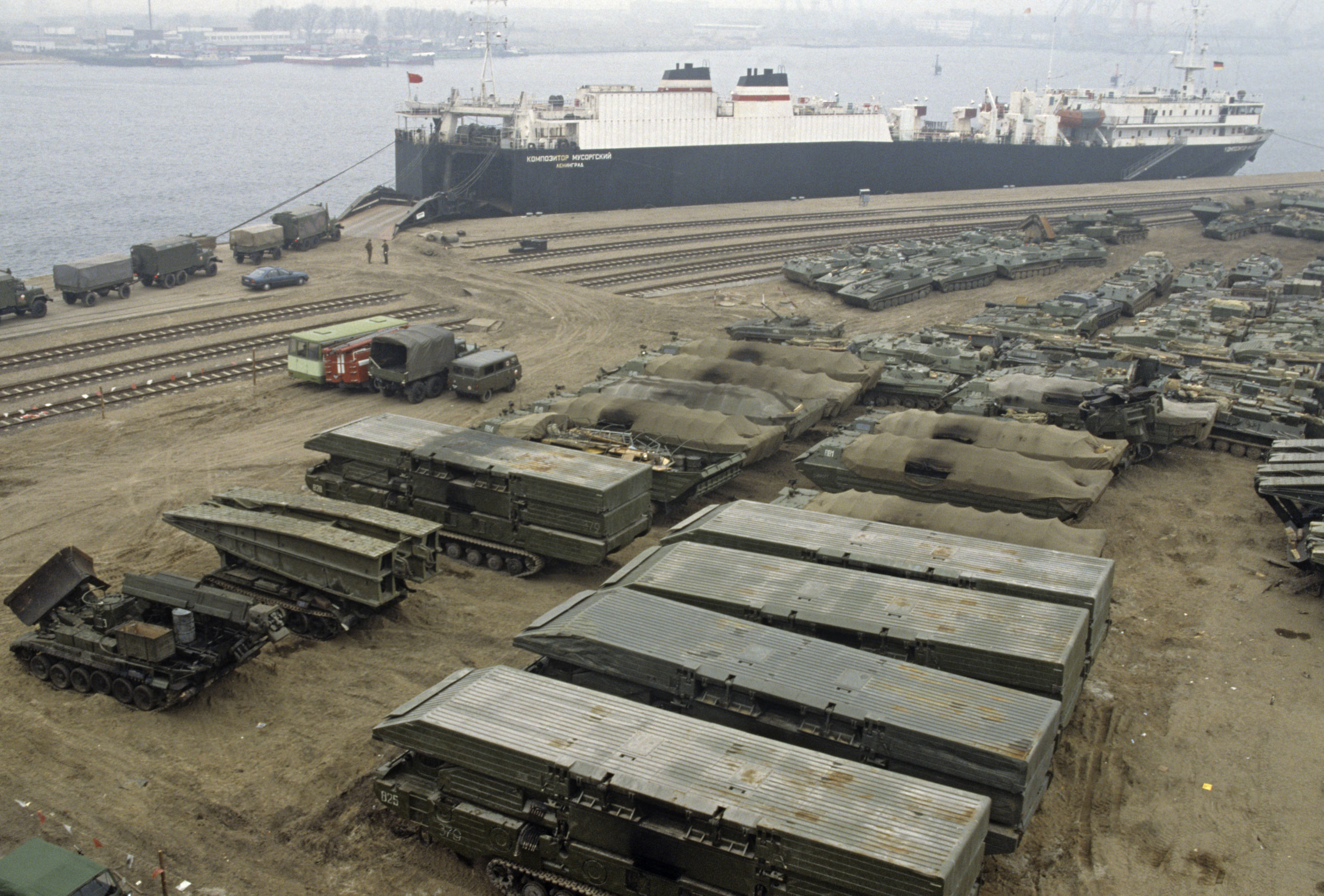
Soviet military equipment being loaded aboard a ferry in Rostock, March 1991.

The return of the troops and material took place particularly by the sea route by means of the ports in Rostock and the island of Rügen, as well as via Poland. The Russian Ground Forces left Germany on 25 June 1994 with a military parade of the 6th Guards Motor Rifle Brigade in Berlin. The parting ceremony in Wünsdorf on 11 June 1994 and in the Treptow Park in Berlin on 31 August 1994 marked the end of the Russian military presence on German soil.

In addition to German territories, the Group of Soviet Forces in Germany operational territory also included the region of town of Szczecin, part of the territories transferred from Germany to Poland following the end of the Second World War. The rest of Poland fell under the Northern Group of Forces, while the southern regions (Austria, Czechoslovakia) were under the Central Group of Forces.

After the fall of the Berlin Wall and the easing of Cold War tensions, discipline in the WGF began to break down. In response to charges of fatal recruit abuse, widespread desertion, and weapons smuggling among Soviet troops, the group Commander-in-Chief, General Boris Snetkov held a November 1990 press conference to deny the charges, in which he stated that only 84 soldiers had died in 1990, mostly in training or traffic accidents; that 83 soldiers had "left units without permission"; and denied allegations weapons smuggling, stating that only seven weapons were "missing". In response to German citizens' complaints, he also halted all training on weekends and holidays, and ended low-level flying over populated places.

Generals directing the withdrawals from Germany diverted arms, equipment, and foreign monies intended to build housing in Russia for the withdrawn troops. Several years later, the last GSFG commander, General Matvey Burlakov, and the Defence Minister, Pavel Grachev, had their involvement exposed. They were also accused of ordering the murder of reporter Dmitry Kholodov, who had been investigating the scandals.

== Structure and equipment in 1991 ==
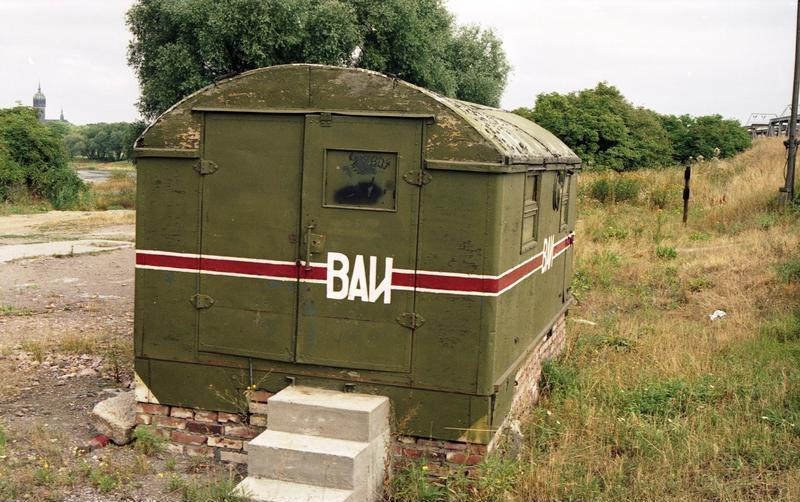
Soviet Military Road Police watchpost in Wittenberg, 1991.

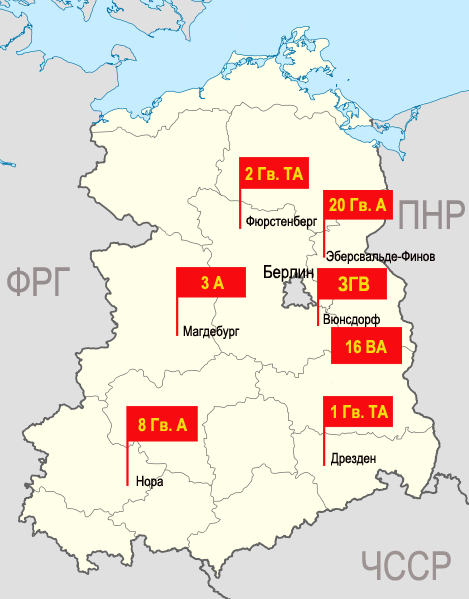
Disposition of Soviet armies in eastern Germany, 1991.

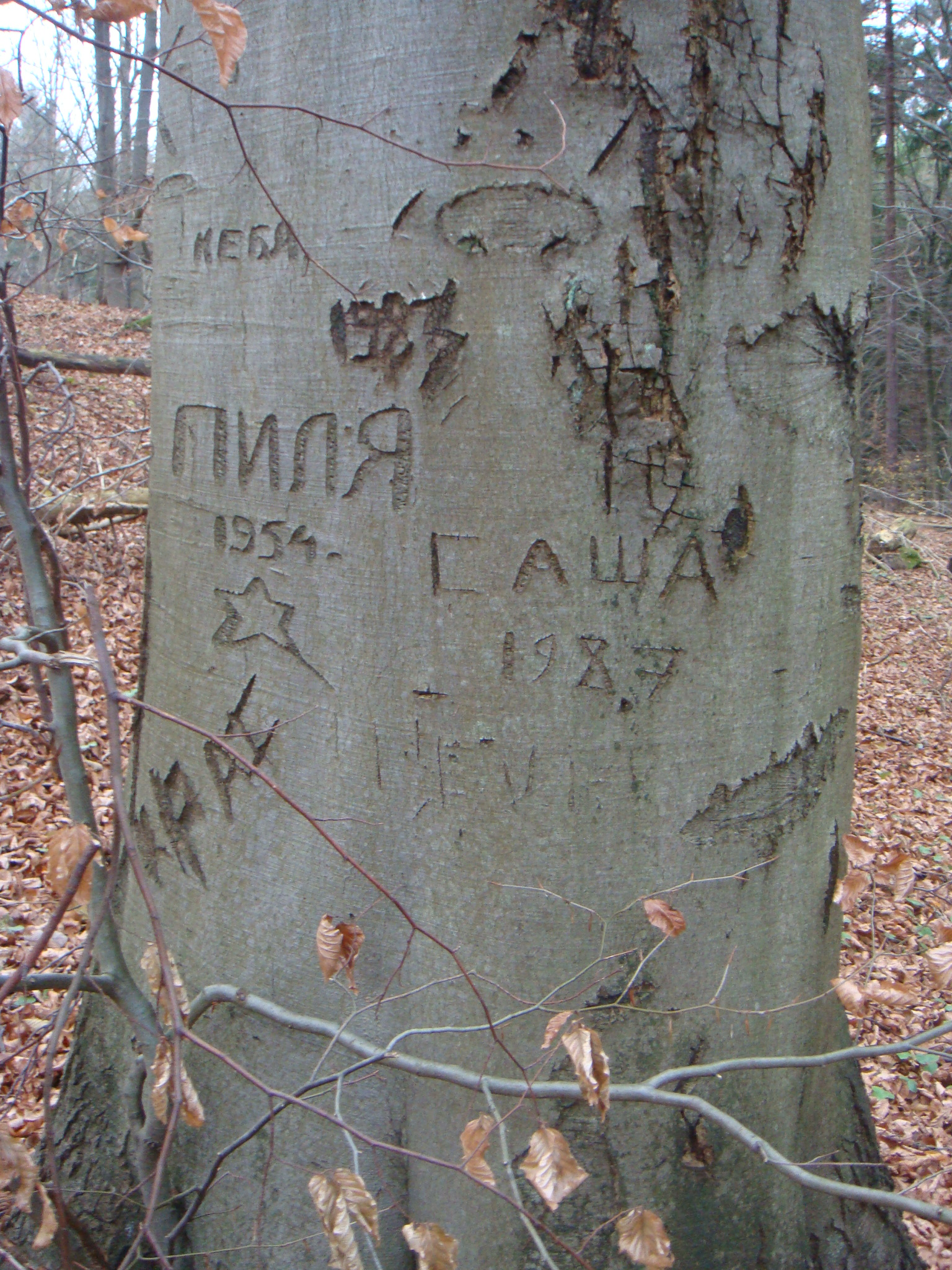
Names of Red Army soldiers carved into a tree in a forest near Jena. The names include Sasha, Pilya and Kebya and date from 1954 to 1987.

The Soviet troops occupied 777 barracks at 276 locations on the territory of the German Democratic Republic. This also included 47 airfields and 116 exercise areas. At the beginning of 1991 there were still about 338,000 soldiers in 24 divisions, distributed among five land armies and an air army in what was by then the Western Group of Forces. In addition, there were about 208,000 relatives of officers as well as civil employees, among them about 90,000 children. Most locations were in the area of today's Brandenburg.

In 1991 there were approximately 4,200 tanks, 8,200 armored vehicles, 3,600 artillery pieces, 106,000 other motor vehicles, 690 aircraft, 680 helicopters, and 180 rocket systems.

At the end of the 1980s, the primary Soviet formations included:

- 1st Guards Tank Red Banner Army – Dresden
  - 9th Tank Division – Riesa
  - 11th Guards Tank Division – Dresden
  - 20th Guards Motor Rifle Division – Grimma
- 2nd Guards Tank Army – Fürstenberg/Havel
  - 16th Guards Tank Division – Neustrelitz
  - 21st Motor Rifle Division – Perleberg
  - 94th Guards Motor Rifle Division – Schwerin
  - 207th Motor Rifle Division – Stendal (note; earlier Western reporting lists this as a Guards unit; this is incorrect)
- 3rd Red Banner Army – Magdeburg (as of 1988)
  - 7th Guards Tank Division – Dessau-Rosslau
  - 10th Guards Uralsko-Lvovskaya Tank Division – Altengrabow
  - 12th Guards Tank Division – Neuruppin
  - 47th Guards Tank Division – Hillersleben
- 8th Guards Order of Lenin Army – Weimar-Nohra
  - 27th Guards Motor Rifle Division – Halle
  - 39th Guards Motor Rifle Division – Ohrdruf
  - 57th Guards Motor Rifle Division – Naumburg
  - 79th Guards Tank Division – Jena
- 20th Guards Red Banner Army – Eberswalde
  - 25th Tank Division – Vogelsang
  - 32nd Guards Tank Division – Jüterbog
  - 35th Motor Rifle Division – Krampnitz
  - 90th Guards Tank Division – Bernau bei Berlin
- 16th Air Army – Zossen
  - 6th Guards Fighter Aviation Division – Merseburg
  - 16th Guards Fighter Aviation Division – Ribnitz-Damgarten. Withdrawn 30 October 1993 to Millerovo, North Caucasus Military District, and joined 4th Air Army.
  - 105th Fighter-Bomber Aviation Division – Großenhain
  - 125th Fighter-Bomber Aviation Division – Rechlin [town, not in airfield] – disbanded July 1993 or October 1993.
  - 126th Fighter Aviation Division – Zerbst

Other Group-level formations included:

- 6th Separate Guards Motor Rifle Brigade (Karlshorst, Berlin) - withdrawn to Kursk in 1994
- 35th Guards Air Assault Brigade (effectively an airmobile brigade; Cottbus, Germany, activated October 1979, and transferred to Kapchagay, Kazakh SSR, in April 1991. Eventually became part of the Kazakh Armed Forces).
- 34th Guards Artillery Division (Potsdam) (formed 25 June 1945 to 9 July 1945 in Germany)
- 3rd Guards Spetsnaz Brigade

Another significant unit was the 57th Engineer-Construction Brigade located at Forst Zinna in Brandenburg (Military Unit Number 96898), part of the wider Soviet Construction Troops.

== Commanders-in-Chief ==
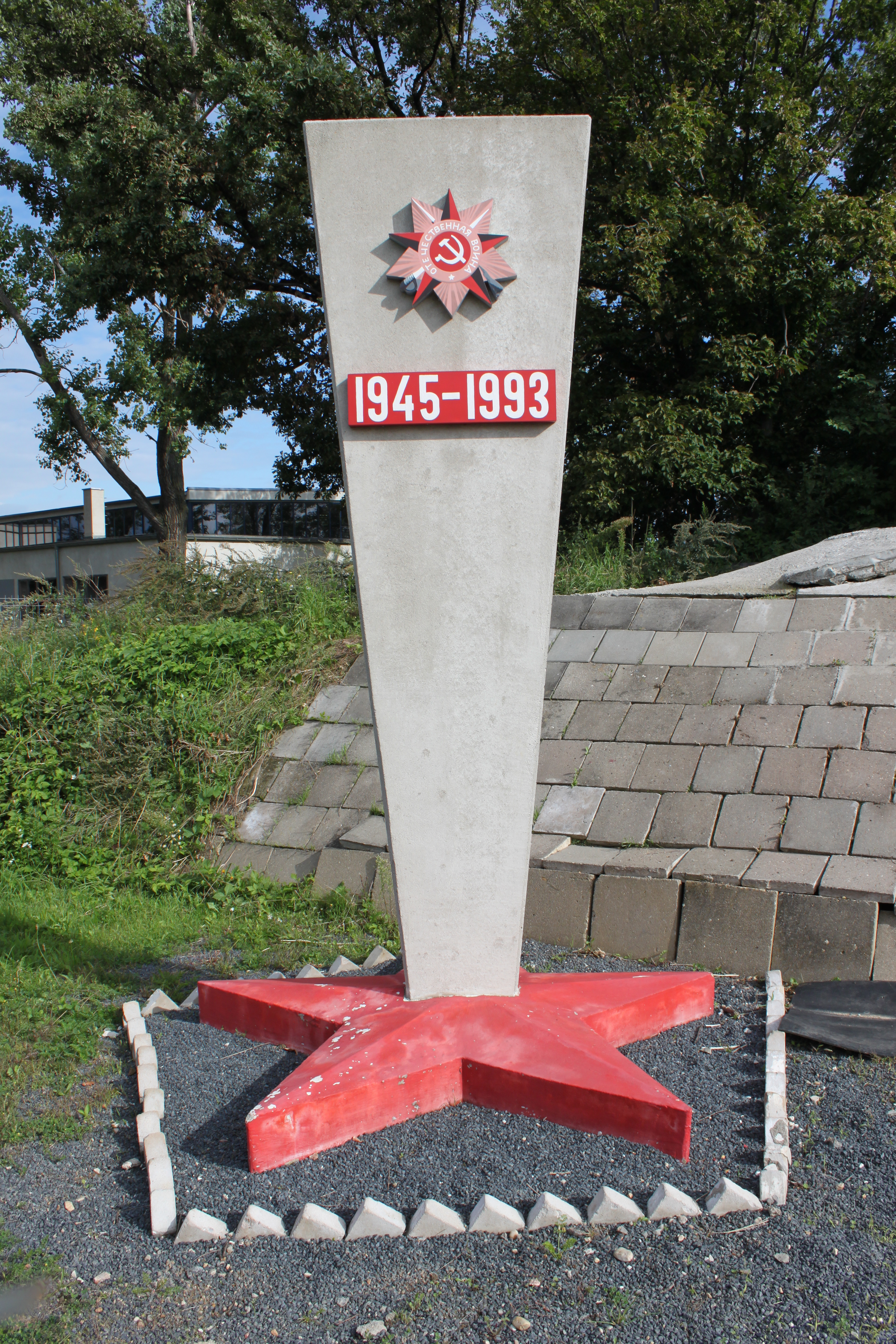
Memorial at the Airport in Großenhain.

The first three commanders-in-chief were also chiefs of the Soviet Military Administration in Germany.

=== GSOFG, 1945–1954 ===
No.	Portrait	Commander-in-Chief	Took office	Left office	Time in office
1	Georgy Zhukov	Marshal of the Soviet Union; Georgy Zhukov (1896–1974)	9 June 1945	21 March 1946	285 days
2	Vasily Sokolovsky	Marshal of the Soviet Union; Vasily Sokolovsky (1897–1968)	22 March 1946	31 March 1949	3 years, 9 days
3	Vasily Chuikov	Army General; Vasily Chuikov (1900–1982)	1 April 1949	26 May 1953	4 years, 55 days
4	Andrei Grechko	Marshal of the Soviet Union; Andrei Grechko (1903–1976)	27 May 1953	16 November 1957	4 years, 173 days

=== GSFG, 1954–1989 ===
No.	Portrait	Commander-in-Chief	Took office	Left office	Time in office
1	Andrei Grechko	Marshal of the Soviet Union; Andrei Grechko (1903–1976)	27 May 1953	16 November 1957	4 years, 173 days
2	Matvei Zakharov	Marshal of the Soviet Union; Matvei Zakharov (1898–1972)	17 November 1957	14 April 1960	2 years, 149 days
3	Ivan Yakubovsky	Army General; Ivan Yakubovsky (1912–1976)	15 April 1960	9 August 1961	1 year, 116 days
4	Ivan Konev	Marshal of the Soviet Union; Ivan Konev (1897–1973)	9 August 1961	18 April 1962	252 days
5	Ivan Yakubovsky	Army General; Ivan Yakubovsky (1912–1976)	19 April 1962	26 January 1965	2 years, 282 days
6	Pyotr Koshevoy	Marshal of the Soviet Union; Pyotr Koshevoy (1904–1976)	27 January 1965	31 October 1969	4 years, 277 days
7	Viktor Kulikov	Marshal of the Soviet Union; Viktor Kulikov (1921–2013)	1 November 1969	13 September 1971	1 year, 316 days
8	Semyon Kurkotkin	Colonel General; Semyon Kurkotkin (1917–1990)	14 September 1971	19 July 1972	3 years, 308 days
9	Yevgeny Ivanovsky	Army General; Yevgeny Ivanovsky (1918–1991)	20 July 1972	25 November 1980	5 years, 128 days
10	Mikhail Zaitsev	Army General; Mikhail Zaitsev (1923–2009)	26 November 1980	6 July 1985	4 years, 222 days
11	Pyotr Lushev	Army General; Pyotr Lushev (1923–1997)	7 July 1985	11 July 1986	1 year, 4 days
12	Valery Belikov [ru]	Army General; Valery Belikov (1925–1987)	12 July 1986	12 November 1987 †	1 year, 123 days

=== WGF, 1989–94 ===
No.	Portrait	Commander-in-Chief	Took office	Left office	Time in office
1	Boris Snetkov	Army general Boris Snetkov (1925–2006)	26 November 1987	13 December 1990	3 years, 17 days
2	Matvey Burlakov	Colonel general Matvey Burlakov (1935–2011)	13 December 1990	31 August 1994	3 years, 261 days

=== WGF military soviet ===
Members (June 1993):

- Commander-in-Chief of the WGF – Colonel general М. P. Burlakov
- 1st deputy commander-in-Chief of the WGF – Colonel general A. N. Mityukhin
- Deputy commander-in-Chief of the WGF for the withdrawal of forces – Lieutenant general С. В. Тshernilevsky
- WGF chief of staff – Lieutenant general A. V. Teretev
- Deputy commander-in-Chief of the WGF for logistics – Lieutenant general W. I. Isakow
- Deputy commander-in-Chief of the EGF for armaments – Major general W. N. Shulikov
- Commander of the 16th Air Army – Lieutenant general A. F. Tarasenko

== See also ==
- List of Soviet divisions 1917–1945
- List of Soviet Army divisions 1989–1991
- United States Army Europe and Africa
