= Battle of Radzymin (1944) =

Battle in Poland during WWII

- Part of the Eastern Front of World War II
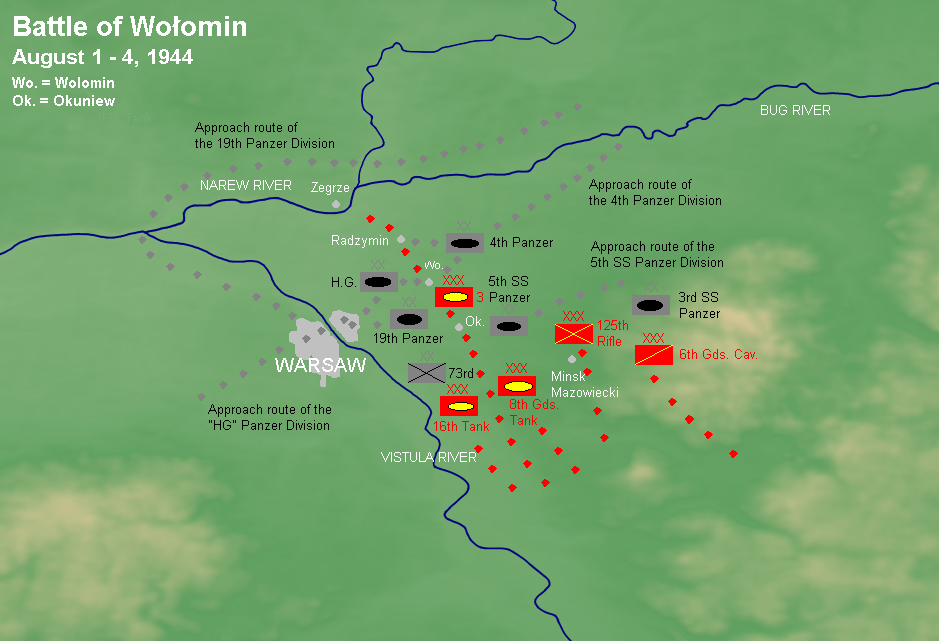
- Battle of Radzymin
Date	1–4 August 1944
Location	near Radzymin, Poland
Result	German victory

Belligerents
Germany	Soviet Union

Commanders and leaders
Walter Model	Konstantin Rokossovsky

The Battle of Radzymin was the engagements between the 1st Byelorussian Front of the Red Army and Army Group Centre of the German Army. The battle was part of the Lublin-Brest Offensive between 1 and 4 August 1944 at the conclusion of Operation Bagration the Belorussian strategic offensive operation near the town of Radzymin in the vicinity of Warsaw. Part of the battle entailed a large tank engagement at Wołomin, the largest tank battle on the territories of Poland during the war.

The approach of the Red Army towards Warsaw served to initiate the Warsaw Uprising by the Home Army with expectation of help from the Red Army. The battle ended in a Soviet defeat and the encirclement and destruction of the Soviet 3rd Tank Corps; it is unclear to what extent this defeat contributed to the Soviet decision not to aid the Warsaw Uprising.

== Before the battle ==
After crossing into Poland, the 1st Byelorussian Front (Konstantin Rokossovsky) continued its advance towards Warsaw. The 65th Army (12 divisions) together with the attached 1st Guards Tank Corps, was to advance towards the town of Serock and then outflank Warsaw from the north. The 28th Army (9 divisions) together with 1st Mechanized and 9th Tank Corps was advancing directly towards Warsaw and was separated from the 47th Army by the Siedlce–Mińsk Mazowiecki line, and from the 65th Army by the Sokołów Podlaski–Węgrów–Radzymin line. The 47th Army (10 divisions) was to seize the southern approaches to Praga, seize right-bank Warsaw and cross the river through the bridges in Warsaw or through a temporary bridge in Góra Kalwaria. The 70th Army (4 divisions) was to follow the 47th and serve as a tactical reserve.

At the same time the remaining forces of the front were to support the assault on Warsaw by crossing the Vistula south of it, near Magnuszew and outflanking the city from the south and west. The 8th Guards Army (9 divisions) together with the 1st Polish Army (3 divisions) and 69th Army (9 divisions aided by the 11th Tank Corps) were to cross the river at Magnuszew.

== Battle ==
After the Soviet reconnaissance units reached Warsaw in late July, on 1 August 1944 the Warsaw Uprising started. Starting from an area south of Mińsk Mazowiecki, the 3rd Tank Corps (Major General Nikolai Vedeneyev) part of the Soviet 2nd Tank Army, thrust north-west through Okuniew and Wołomin to Radzymin, reaching an area only 3 mi (4.8 km) from the bridge over the Narew River at Zegrze.

The Germans started a counter-attack near Radzymin on 31 July. Carried out by four under-strength panzer divisions, the attack was to secure the eastern approaches to Warsaw and Vistula crossings and to destroy the three tank corps of the Second Tank Army in detail. Under the leadership of Field Marshal Walter Model, the 4th Panzer Division, 19th Panzer Division, Hermann Göring and the 5th SS Panzer Division were concentrated from different areas, with their arrival in the area of Wołomin occurring between 31 July and 1 August 1944. Although the 3rd Tank Corps gamely defended the initial assaults of the Hermann Göring and 19th Panzer Divisions, the arrival of the 4th Panzer and 5th SS Panzer divisions doomed the isolated and outnumbered unit.

On 1 August, the leading elements of the 19th and 5th SS Panzer divisions, closing from the west and east respectively, met at Okuniew, cutting the 3rd Tank Corps off from the Second Tank Army. Pressed into the area of Wołomin, the 3rd Tank Corps was pocketed and destroyed on 3 August 1944. Attempts to reach the tank corps by the 8th Guards Tank Corps and the 16th Tank Corps failed, with the 8th Guards Tank Corps suffering severe losses in the attempt. Although Model had planned to attack the 8th Guards Tank Corps next, the withdrawal of the 19th and Hermann Göring Panzer divisions to shore up the German defenses around the Magnuszew bridgehead, forced the remaining German forces around Okuniew to go on the defensive.

For unknown reasons, on 2 August 1944 all armies that were to assault Warsaw had their orders changed. The 28th, 47th and 65th armies were ordered to turn northwards and seize the undefended town of Wyszków and the Liwiec river line. The 2nd Tank Army was left in place and had to fight the Germans alone, without support of the infantry. The 69th Army was ordered to stop while the 8th Guards Army under Vasily Chuikov was ordered to halt the assault and await a German attack from the direction of Garwolin. The fighting lasted until 10 August, when the Germans withdrew. Soviet losses were severe but not enough to affect the thrust to the vicinity of Warsaw. The 3rd Tank Corps was destroyed, the 8th Guards Tank Corps had many losses and the 16th Tank Corps was also considerably depleted. The Second Tank Army's losses were significant enough that it was withdrawn from the front by 5 August 1944.

== Aftermath ==
Between 1 and 10 August, the 2nd Tank Army lost 409 men killed in action, 1,271 wounded and 589 missing. It lost 284 tanks and self-propelled guns (40 percent of these losses were non-recoverable, amounting to 113 armored vehicles lost permanently) out of 679 available to the army on 30 July. After the war, communist propaganda used the example of the Battle of Radzymin of 1944 as a proof that the German counter-attack prevented the Red Army from helping the Warsaw Uprising. It remains unknown why the Soviet assault was halted as some Russian archives are still closed to historians. Some Polish and western historians claim that the Soviet assault was halted because Stalin wanted the Warsaw insurgents, loyal to the Polish government in exile (known for its anti-Soviet stance) destroyed. The Soviet command apparently did not blame Lieutenant-General N. D. Vedeneev for the encirclement and destruction of the 3rd Tank Corps. Vedeneev survived the battle and remained in command. The 3rd Tank Corps was honored by being named the 9th Guards Tank Corps in November 1944.

== Order of Battle, 1st Belorussian Front on 1 August 1944 ==
- 8th Guards Army
  - 4th Guards Rifle Corps
  - 28th Guards Rifle Corps
  - 29th Guards Rifle Corps
  - 11th Guards Heavy Tank Brigade
- 28th Army
  - 3rd Guards Rifle Corps
  - 20th Rifle Corps
  - 128th Rifle Corps
  - 22nd Artillery Division
- 47th Army
  - 77th Rifle Corps
  - 125th Rifle Corps
  - 129th Rifle Corps
  - 60th Rifle Division
- 48th Army
  - 29th Rifle Corps
  - 42nd Rifle Corps
  - 53rd Rifle Corps
  - 194th Rifle Division
- 65th Army
  - 18th Rifle Corps
  - 46th Rifle Corps
  - 80th Rifle Corps
  - 105th Rifle Corps
  - 115th Rifle Brigade
  - 26th Artillery Division
- 69th Army
  - 25th Rifle Corps
  - 61st Rifle Corps
  - 91st Rifle Corps
  - 68th Tank Brigade
- 70th Army
  - 96th Rifle Corps
  - 114th Rifle Corps
- 2nd Tank Army
  - 8th Guards Tank Corps
  - 3rd Tank Corps
  - 16th Tank Corps
- Polish 1st Army
  - 1st Army Corps
  - 2nd Army Corps
  - 1st Tank Corps
- 2nd Guards Cavalry Corps
- 4th Guards Cavalry Corps
- 7th Guards Cavalry Corps
- 4th Breakthrough Artillery Corps
- 1st Guards Tank Corps
- 1st Mechanized Corps
- 9th Tank Corps
- 11th Tank Corps

== German units present at the Battle of Wołomin ==
- 73rd Infantry Division (facing Soviet 16th Tank Corps)
- 19th Panzer Division (facing Soviet 3rd Tank and 8th Guards Tank Corps)
- Hermann Göring Panzer Division (facing Soviet 3rd Tank Corps)
- 4th Panzer Division (facing Soviet 3rd Tank Corps)
- 5th SS Panzer Division (facing Soviet 3rd Tank and 125th Rifle Corps)

== See also ==
- Lead up to the Warsaw Uprising
- Lack of outside support in the Warsaw Uprising
- Operation Bagration

== Notes ==
1. In 1941, a massive tank battle took place in the vicinity of Brody; this area was nominally a part of Poland until border agreements with USSR were signed in 1945. However, the official Polish historiography during the communist period was that the river Bug formed Poland's eastern border and the Polish territories east of it were called "Western Ukraine and Belarus". Nevertheless, the battle of Radzymin remains the largest tank battle on the territory of present-day Poland.
2. The 19th PzD had 70 armored fighting vehicles (AFV), meaning tanks, assault guns, and tank destroyers, the Hermann Göring had 63 AFVs, the 5th SS PzD had 66 AFVs, and the 4th PzD had 78 AFVs. Source for this data is Germany and the Second World War, p. 581.
3. When Titans Clash, p. 213.
4. Germany and the Second World War, pp. 582–583.
5. Танковый удар: танковая армия в наступательной операции фронта по опыту Великой Отечественной войны by Радзиевский Алексей Иванович, Map of 2nd Tank Army operations map
6. Танковый удар: танковая армия в наступательной операции фронта по опыту Великой Отечественной войны by Радзиевский Алексей Иванович link
7. Germany and the Second World War, p. 584, notes that Second Tank Army's strength in tanks and assault guns was 810 on 22 July 1944, and that this had dwindled to 263 armored fighting vehicles by 4 August 1944.
