= 1st Guards Tank Division =

1942-1945 Red Army formation

26th Tank Corps (Apr. – 8 Dec, 1942) 1st Guards Tank Corps (8 Dec 1942 – 12 Jul 1945) 1st Guards Tank Division (12 Jul 1945 – Feb 1947)
- Active: 1942–1947
- Country: Soviet Union
- Branch: Red Army / Soviet Army
- Type: Armored
- Garrison/HQ: Neuruppin (1945–1947)
- Engagements: World War II; Battle of Stalingrad; Third Battle of Kharkov; Operation Kutuzov; Operation Bagration; East Prussian Offensive; East Pomeranian Offensive; Berlin Offensive
- Decorations: Order of Lenin; Order of the Red Banner; Order of Suvorov, 2nd class
- Battle honours: Don

Commanders
- Notable commanders: Alexey Rodin; Mikhail Panov

The 1st Guards Tank Division was a tank division of the Soviet Army from 1945 to 1947, stationed in Neuruppin. It was formed in the spring of 1942 as the 26th Tank Corps. The corps fought in Operation Uranus and became the 1st Guards Tank Corps, being redesignated as a reward for its actions in December 1942. It fought in Operation Gallop, the Third Battle of Kharkov, Operation Kutuzov, Operation Bagration, the East Prussian Offensive, the East Pomeranian Offensive, and the Berlin Offensive. During the East Prussian Offensive, the division captured Mława, Działdowo and Płońsk and was awarded the Order of Lenin for its actions. The division had been awarded the honorific "Don" for its actions in Operation Gallop. It was also awarded the Order of the Red Banner and the Order of Suvorov 2nd class.

== History ==
=== World War II ===
The 26th Tank Corps was formed between 24 June and 10 August 1942 in Kosteryovo. It was commanded by Major General Alexey Rodin. The corps included the 19th, 157th and 216th Tank Brigades and the 14th Motor Rifle Brigade. From 10 August to 9 September, the corps was transferred to Plavsk. On 3 September, it was subordinated to the 5th Tank Army.

In October, the army was transferred to the Southwestern Front and began to prepare for the counteroffensive at Stalingrad, Operation Uranus. On 19 November, the 26th Tank Corps began its advance in the second echelon of the 5th Tank Army. It broke through Romanian lines in the area of Blinovsky and Korotovsky, advancing south towards Perelazovsky and Kalach. The corps overran the Romanian 1st Armored Division's rear area and captured the headquarters of the Romanian 5th Army Corps.

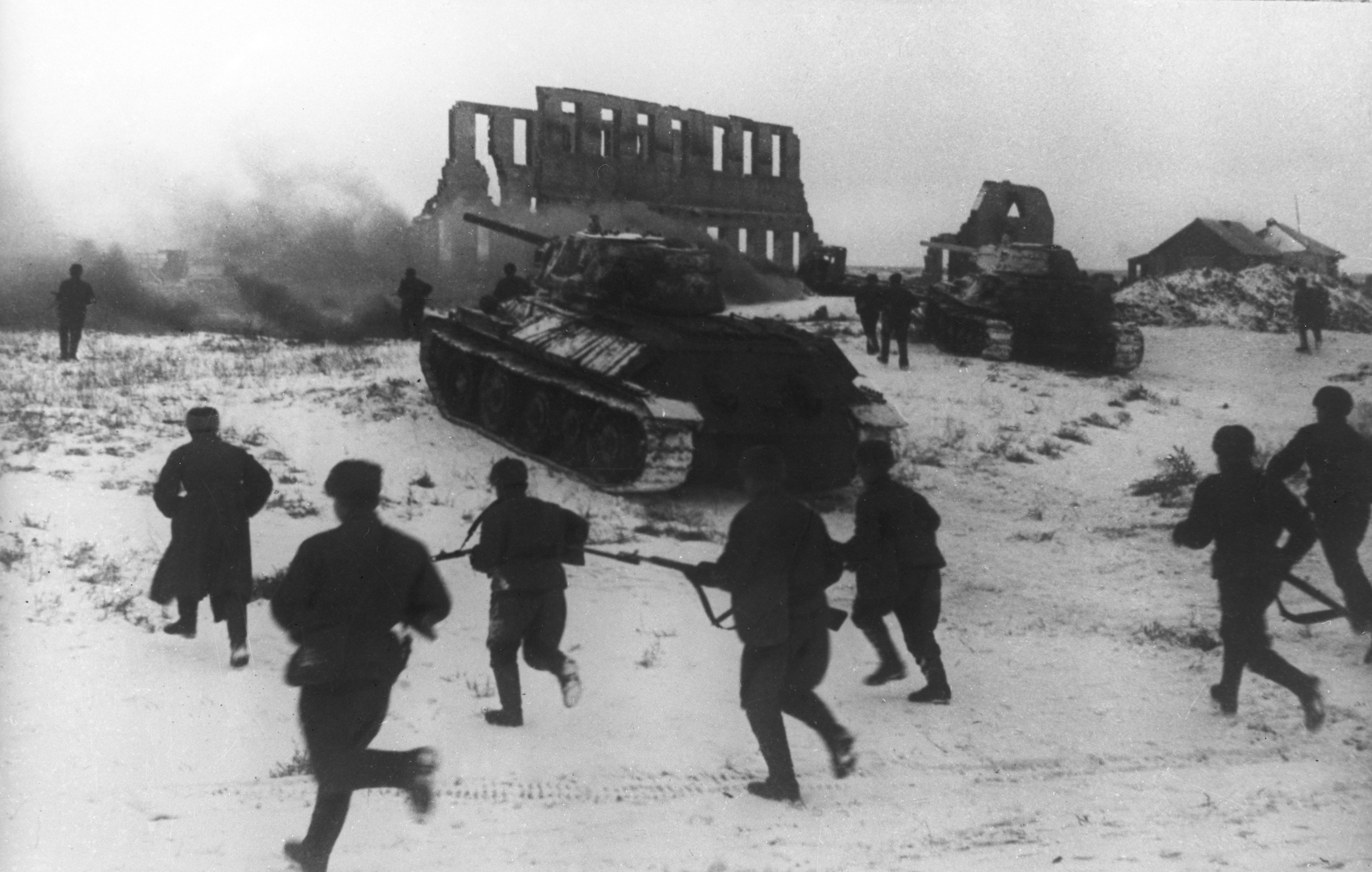
Soviet tanks and infantry, probably from the 26th Tank Corps during the advance on Kalach

Forward detachments of the corps forced German commander Friedrich Paulus to move his headquarters on 21 November. On the night of 22–23 November, Rodin ordered the corps' vanguard units, led by Lieutenant Colonel Georgy Filippov to reconnoitre the last bridge over the Don at Kalach. Filippov advanced at high speed with headlights on, reportedly causing the German troops guarding the bridge to believe captured Soviet armor was being driven to the nearby gunnery range. Filippov and his tanks crossed the bridge and defeated the German troops guarding it. The corps helped occupy Kalach on the next day.

On 8 December, the 26th Tank Corps became the 1st Guards Tank Corps for its actions at Stalingrad. The 216th Tank Brigade became the 15th Guards, the 19th became the 16th Guards, the 157th became the 17th Guards and the 14th Motor Rifle Brigade became the 1st Guards.

On 27 January 1943, the corps was awarded the honorific "Don" for its actions. Rodin was promoted to Lieutenant general and became commander of the 2nd Tank Army in early February. 6th Army Tank Troops commander Major General Alexander Kukushkin took command. During February and March, the corps fought in the Third Battle of Kharkov. It defended positions north of Pavlohrad and fled to escape an encirclement on 24 February. On 25 April, Kukushkin was killed during an enemy air raid. 2nd Guards Army Tank Troops commander Major General Mikhail Panov took command. During the summer it fought in Operation Kutuzov. From October 1943, it fought in Belarus during the Gomel-Rechitsa Offensive. The corps captured Rechytsa in November and cut off the German line of retreat west of Gomel. For its actions, the corps was awarded the Order of the Red Banner on 18 November.

The corps fought in the Kalinkovichi-Mozyr Offensive in January 1944. The corps captured Kalinkavichy on 14 January after outflanking defending German troops. On 15 January, the corps was awarded the Order of Suvorov 2nd class for its actions. From June, the corps fought in Operation Bagration. On 24 June, the corps advanced through the gap made by the advance of the 65th Army. By 27 June, the corps linked up with elements of the 9th Tank Corps, completing the encirclement of five German 9th Army divisions in the Bobruysk Offensive. The corps continued to advanced towards Pukhavichy and Osipovichi. On 3 July, the corps was on the southeastern outskirts of Minsk and helped complete the encirclement of the German 4th Army around Minsk. After the capture of Minsk, the corps advanced toward Baranovichi and Brest. The corps helped capture Slonim.

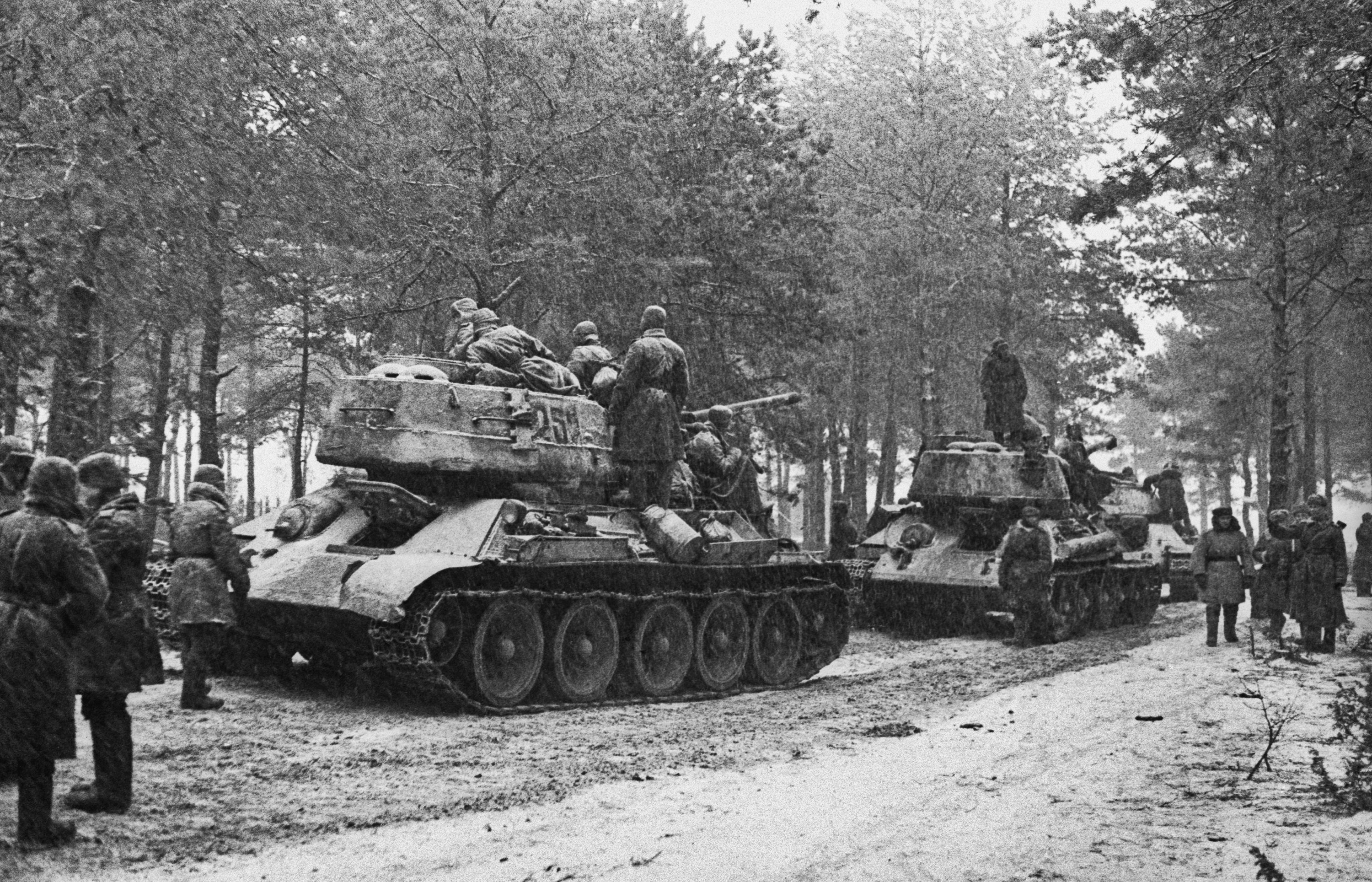
A column of T-34-85 tanks of the corps on a road in East Prussia, 13 January 1945

From mid-November 1944, the corps was part of the 2nd Belorussian Front. From January 1945, the corps fought in the East Prussian Offensive. During the offensive, the corps helped capture Płońsk and Tuchola. On 19 February, the corps was awarded the Order of Lenin for its capture of Plonsk. At the end of March, the corps fought in the capture of Gdańsk during the East Pomeranian Offensive. From April, the division fought in the Berlin Offensive. It reached the Baltic coast near Rostock and Ribnitz at the end of the war.

=== Postwar ===
On 12 July 1945, the corps was converted into the 1st Guards Tank Division at Neuruppin. The division's brigades were converted into tank regiments. It was disbanded in February 1947. The division's 15th Guards Tank Regiment was transferred to the 39th Guards Rifle Division. The 16th Guards Tank Regiment moved to the 207th Rifle Division and the 17th Guards Tank Regiment transferred to the 57th Guards Rifle Division. The 74th Guards Heavy Tank Self-Propelled Regiment transferred to the 26th Guards Rifle Division.

== Composition ==
In 1947, the division included the following units:

- 15th Guards Tank Regiment
- 16th Guards Tank Regiment
- 17th Guards Tank Regiment
- 74th Guards Heavy Tank Self-Propelled Regiment
- 1st Guards Motor Rifle Regiment
- 455th Mortar Regiment
- 80th Guards Anti-Aircraft Artillery Regiment
- Separate Howitzer Artillery Battalion
- 121st Separate Sapper Battalion
- 422nd Separate Communications Battalion
- 155th Separate Medical Battalion
- 676th Separate Auto-Transport Battalion
