= Alexey Rodin =

Soviet Army colonel general (1902–1955)

Alexey Grigoryevich Rodin
- Алексей Григорьевич Родин
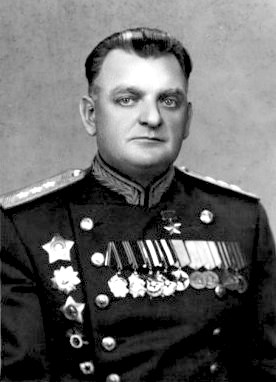
- Born: 17 February 1902; Zuyevo village, Ostashkovsky District, Tver Governorate, Russian Empire
- Died: 27 May 1955 (aged 53); Moscow, Soviet Union
- Burial place: Novodevichy Cemetery
- Military career
- Allegiance: Soviet Union
- Branch: Red Army
- Service years: 1920–1954
- Rank: Colonel general
- Commands: 124th Tank Brigade; 26th Tank Corps; 1st Guards Tank Corps; 2nd Tank Army
- Conflicts: Russian Civil War; Southern Front; World War II; Winter War; Eastern Front; Baltic Operation; Leningrad Strategic Defensive; Lyuban Offensive Operation; Battle of Stalingrad; Operation Kutuzov; Battle of the Dnieper; Operation Suvorov; Operation Bagration; East Prussian Offensive
- Awards: Hero of the Soviet Union

Alexey Grigoryevich Rodin (Russian: Алексей Григорьевич Родин; 17 February 1902 – 27 May 1955) was a Soviet Army colonel general and Hero of the Soviet Union.

Born to a peasant family, Rodin was drafted into the Red Army in 1920. After fighting in the Russian Civil War, he became an officer and rose to command 50th Rifle Corps Armored and Mechanized forces during the Winter War. After the end of the war, Rodin became deputy commander of the 24th Tank Division and fought in the Baltic Operation and the Leningrad Strategic Defensive. Given command of the 124th Tank Brigade in September 1941, he led the unit during battles around Leningrad and in the Lyuban Offensive Operation. From June 1942, Rodin commanded the 26th Tank Corps and led the unit during Operation Uranus. For its actions, the corps became the 1st Guards Tank Corps and Rodin received the title Hero of the Soviet Union. After Stalingrad, he was promoted to command the 2nd Tank Army and led it during Operation Kutuzov and the Battle of the Dnieper, but was dismissed due to lack of progress and heavy losses incurred in the army's advance. In September 1943, Rodin became commander of the Western Front (later 3rd Belorussian Front) Armored and Mechanized Forces, participating in Operation Suvorov, Operation Bagration and the East Prussian Offensive. Postwar, he became head of the Directorate of Combat Training of the Armored and Mechanized Forces before retirement in 1954.

== Early life ==
Rodin was born on 17 February 1902 in Zuyevo village in Tver Governorate to a peasant family. In April 1920, he was drafted into the Red Army and became a Red Army man. Rodin fought in the Russian Civil War on the Southern Front in the Kuban and in the Caucasus. He served with the Separate Cavalry Battalion of the 9th Army. In December 1920, the battalion was reorganized into the 2nd Cavalry Regiment of the 31st Rifle Division, where Rodin served as a senior clerk. The division took part in the suppression of partisan groups in the Kuban and Caucasus. In February 1921, Rodin became adjutant of the escort unit of the 9th Army's Revolutionary Military Council.

== Interwar ==
After the end of the fighting in August 1922, Rodin became a cadet at the Vladikavkaz Combat Arms Courses. In January 1923 he was enrolled in the Krasnodar Red Army Courses and the Moscow Artillery School in August. In September 1926, Rodin graduated from the Moscow Artillery School. He also joined the Communist Party of the Soviet Union in that year. He was sent to the Ural Military District, where he became chief of intelligence and communications for the 9th Horse Artillery Battalion. In October 1927, he was transferred to the 45th Artillery Regiment of the 45th Rifle Division and became an assistant battery commander. Subsequently, Rodin became chief of supply of the regiment and a battery commander. He commanded a battalion of the 45th Rifle Division motorized detachment from June 1931 before returning to the 45th Artillery Regiment in February 1932 to serve in the same role. In January 1933, he was sent to the Military Academy of Mechanization and Motorization.

He received the rank of Major in 1936. In 1937, he graduated from the Military Academy of Mechanization and Motorization and transferred to the tank troops. From December 1937, he was the chief of staff of the 9th Mechanized Brigade. In 1938, he was promoted to colonel. From August 1939, he was head of the Armored and Mechanized Troops of the 50th Rifle Corps. He fought in the Winter War with the corps. On 23 January, Rodin reportedly prevented a panic in the rear area of the 138th Rifle Division and organized the repulsion of a Finnish counterattack. In July 1940, he was given command of the 5th Tank Regiment of the 3rd Tank Division. In December 1940, he transferred to command the 2nd Light Tank Brigade in the Leningrad Military District. In March 1941, he became deputy commander of the 24th Tank Division.

== World War II ==
The division fought in the Baltic Operation and then the Leningrad Strategic Defensive. Rodin's division defended the Luga defensive line for one month. In September 1941, he became commander of the 124th Tank Brigade. In February 1942, the brigade transferred to the 54th Army at Volkhov and fought in the unsuccessful Lyuban Offensive Operation. From May, Rodin was the deputy commander of the 54th Army Armored and Mechanized Troops. On 3 May, he was promoted to major general. In June 1942, he became commander of the 26th Tank Corps. The corps fought in Operation Uranus and captured Kalach on 23 November. The corps became the 1st Guards Tank Corps and later received the honorific "Don" for its actions. On 7 February 1943, Rodin was awarded the title Hero of the Soviet Union and the Order of Lenin for his leadership of the corps.

After the end of the Battle of Stalingrad in February, Rodin became commander of the 2nd Tank Army. He received a promotion to lieutenant general on 4 February. During February and March, the army fought in the unsuccessful offensive to capture Sevsk and Smolensk. In July, the army fought in Operation Kutuzov. The army then fought in the Chernigov-Pripyat Offensive during the Battle of the Dnieper during August and September. On 2 August due to the lack of progress and heavy losses Rodin was dismissed as commander of the 2nd Tank Army and was replaced by Lieutenant General Semyon Bogdanov. He was awarded the Order of the Patriotic War 1st class on 27 August. On 9 September, Rodin became commander of the armored and mechanized forces of the Western Front. He participated in Operation Suvorov. In April 1944, the Western Front became the 3rd Belorussian Front. During the summer of 1944 he fought in Operation Bagration. Rodin was awarded the Order of Kutuzov 1st class on 3 July. On 15 July 1944, he was promoted to colonel general. In the spring of 1945, Rodin participated in the East Prussian Offensive.

== Postwar ==
After the end of the war, Rodin continued to serve in the army. From July 1945, he commanded the armored and mechanized forces of the Baranovichi Military District, which was used to reform the Belorussian Military District. Placed at the disposal of the commander of the Armored and Mechanized Forces of the Soviet Ground Forces in December 1946, Rodin became the commander of the Carpathian Military District Armored and Mechanized Forces in March 1947. In February 1949, he became chief of combat training directorate of the armored and mechanized forces. In 1953, he graduated from higher academic courses at the Military Academy of the General Staff and became a senior professor there. Rodin retired in October 1954 and died on 27 May 1955. He was buried in Moscow at the Novodevichy Cemetery.

== Awards and honors ==
| Hero of the Soviet Union (7 February 1943) |
| Order of Lenin, twice (7 February 1943, 30 April 1945) |
| Order of the Red Banner, twice (21 March 1940, 3 November 1944) |
| Order of Suvorov, 1st class (19 April 1945) |
| Order of Suvorov, 2nd class (7 February 1943) |
| Order of Kutuzov, 1st class (3 July 1944) |
| Order of the Patriotic War, 1st class (27 August 1943) |
| Medal "For the Defence of Stalingrad" (1942) |
| Medal "For the Defence of Leningrad" (1942) |
| Medal "For the Capture of Königsberg" (1945) |
| Medal "For the Victory over Germany in the Great Patriotic War 1941–1945" (1945) |
| Jubilee Medal "XX Years of the Workers' and Peasants' Red Army" (1938) |
| Jubilee Medal "30 Years of the Soviet Army and Navy" (1948) |
