= Alexei Radzievsky =

Soviet Union soldier who fought in WWII (1911–1978)

Alexei Ivanovich Radzievsky
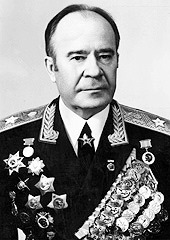
- Born: August 13, 1911; Uman, Russian Empire (today in Ukraine)
- Died: August 30, 1979 (aged 68); Moscow, Soviet Union
- Military career
- Allegiance: (Soviet Union) USSR
- Branch: Red Army; Soviet Army
- Service years: 1929–1978
- Rank: Army General
- Commands: 2nd Guards Tank Army; Northern Armed Forces Group; Turkestan Military District; Odessa Military District
- Conflicts: Second World War
- Awards: Hero of the Soviet Union; Order of Lenin; Order of the Red Banner; Order of Kutuzov, 1st class; Order of Suvorov, 2nd class
- Other work: Commandant of the M. V. Frunze Military Academy, 1969–1978

Alexei Ivanovich Radzievsky (Russian: Алексей Иванович Радзиевский; Ukrainian: Олексій Іванович Радзієвський; 13 August [O.S. 31 July] 1911 – 30 August 1979), was a professional soldier of the Soviet Union who fought in the Second World War, commanding the 2nd Guards Tank Army during the Lublin–Brest offensive and afterwards. He later rose to the rank of full Army General and was the author of works on military strategy.

From 1969 to 1978 Radzievsky was Commandant of the M. V. Frunze Military Academy and in February 1978 was made a Hero of the Soviet Union, the highest Soviet award.

== Life ==
Born in Uman (now in the Cherkasy region of central Ukraine), Radzievsky left school in 1927 to work as a moulder in a silicate brick factory in his home town. In 1929 he joined the Red Army and graduated from the Cavalry School in 1931, going on to command first a platoon, later a squadron. In 1938 he attended the M. V. Frunze Military Academy and in 1941 passed the Military Academy of the General Staff.

With the outbreak of hostilities with the Axis powers in July 1941, he joined the newly formed 53rd (4th Guards) Cavalry Division and saw fighting in the Demidov, Dukhovshchina, and the Battle of Moscow, then with the Cavalry Corps fought at the Kharkov, in the crossing of the Dnieper, and in the liberation of Kyiv, Zhytomyr, and other cities. On 28 February 1944 Radzievsky was appointed Chief of staff of the 2nd Guards Tank Army with the rank of Major General. In July 1944, during the Lublin–Brest offensive, the Army's commanding officer, Colonel-General Semyon Bogdanov, was seriously wounded, and Radzievsky took over his command, which he retained until Bogdanov's return on 7 January 1945. His forces took a leading role in the liberation of a string of Polish cities, including Lublin, Siedlce, Łuków, Skierniewice, Lovech, and Łódź.

At the end of July 1944 Radzievsky's 2nd Guards Tank Army routed the German 73rd Infantry Division at Garwolin, capturing its commander, Friedrich Franek, and in the next four days the army advanced to the edge of Warsaw, with five hundred tanks still operational. However, the Warsaw Uprising had begun on 1 August, and the Soviets did not seek to take the Polish capital until January 1945. On 2 November 1944 Radzievsky was promoted Lieutenant General.

== Postwar ==
After the end of the war, Radzievsky continued to serve as chief of staff of the 2nd Guards Tank Army, which was redesignated as the 2nd Guards Mechanized Army on 12 June 1946. He rose to command the army, stationed in occupied Germany, on 28 May 1947. Radzievsky was promoted to a series of progressively more senior posts: to command of the Northern Group of Forces in Poland on 18 September 1950, the Turkestan Military District on 8 July 1952, and the Armored and Mechanized Forces of the Soviet Army on 22 April 1953. He was promoted to the rank of colonel general on 3 August 1953. The title of his position was changed to Chief of the Armored Forces of the Soviet Army on 11 January 1954.

Radzievsky was appointed commander of the Odesa Military District on 31 May 1954, his last operational command before being appointed to the training post of deputy chief of the Military Academy of the General Staff on 3 June 1959. Radzievsky was transferred to serve as chief of the Main Directorate for Military Training Institutions on 11 April 1968 and became chief of the Frunze Military Academy on 18 July 1969, being promoted to the rank of army general on 2 November 1972. This was his last active post before his transfer to the retirement position of inspector of the Group of Inspectors General of the Ministry of Defense on 7 February 1978. He died in Moscow on 30 August 1979.

Radzievsky was twice awarded the Order of Lenin and was also appointed as a member of the Order of the Red Banner, the Order of Kutuzov (1st class), the Order of Suvorov (2nd class), and of many other Soviet and foreign Orders. In 1972 he achieved the rank of Army General and in 1978 was made a Hero of the Soviet Union.

== Dates of rank ==
- Colonel (18 April 1942)
- General-mayor (17 November 1943)
- General-lieutenant (2 November 1944)
- Colonel General (3 August 1953)
- Army General (2 November 1972)

== Publications ==
- A. I. Radzievsky, ed., Akademiya imeni M. V. Frunze: Istoriya voennoi ordena Lenina Krasnoznamennoi ordena Suvorova Akademyi ("The Academy Named after M. V. Frunze: History of the Order of Lenin Red Banner, Order of Suvorov Military Academy") (Moscow: Voyenizdat, 1972)
- A. I. Radzievsky, ed., Taktika v boevykh primerakh (polk) ("Tactics by combat example (the regiment)") (Moscow: Voyenisdat, 1974)
- A. I. Radzievsky, ed., Taktika v boevykh primerakh (diviziia) ("Tactics by combat example (the division)") (Moscow: Voyenizdat, 1976)
- A. I. Radzievsky, Tankovyi udar ("Tank strike") (Moscow: Voyenizdat, 1977)
- A. I. Radzievsky, Proryv ("Penetration") (Moscow: Voyenizdat, 1979)
