= Outside support during the Warsaw Uprising =

The Warsaw Uprising, in 1944, ended in the capitulation of the city and its near total destruction by the German forces. According to many historians, a major cause of this was the almost complete lack of outside support and the late arrival of the support which did arrive. The only support operation which ran continuously for the duration of the Uprising were night supply drops by long-range planes of the Royal Air Force (RAF), other Commonwealth air forces, and especially units of the Polish Air Force (PAF), which had to use distant airfields in Italy (Brindisi and others) and so had very limited effect.

The Soviets made clear their view on the situation in Warsaw to United States Ambassador, W. Averell Harriman. On 15 August 1944, Harriman received a note from Soviet Deputy Foreign Minister Andrey Vyshinsky. In this note, Vyshinsky was instructed by Foreign Minister Vyacheslav Molotov to inform Harriman that the Soviet Government "could not go along" with US plans to airdrop arms to resistance groups in Warsaw and that the "action in Warsaw into which the Warsaw populations had been drawn was a purely adventuristic affair and the Soviet Government could not lend its hand to it." Vyshinsky's note concluded that Stalin had pointed out to Churchill on 5 August that one could not imagine how a few Polish detachments of the so-called National Army possessing neither tanks, artillery, or aviation could "take" Warsaw when the Nazis had four tank divisions at their disposal for the defense of the city.

A major reason that has also emerged was Stalin had sought to colonize Poland and forming a communist state that worked as a Soviet satellite, and a successful uprising by the Polish Home Army could threaten Stalin's plan. Thus choosing to not support the uprising served Stalin's hegemonic ambitions. If judging Stalin's political intentions, there could be alternate logistic reasons why the Soviet forces could not provide aid to Warsaw. One alternate explanation which has been given for the lack of early support is that the uprising began too early and the nearby Soviet forces could not fight to the city to support the uprising. Before and at the time of uprising, the German army started a massive Panzer force counterattack near Warsaw.

Another possible explanation is that the Red Army was simply exhausted and hence unable to extend effective support to the Uprising. In support of this thesis, it is often claimed (mostly by Soviet sources) that since the opening of Operation Bagration many Red Army units had covered several hundred miles in a far-ranging offensive, and their advance elements were at the very end of their logistical tether. This, coupled with the presence of several Panzer divisions from the Waffen-SS and the Wehrmacht around Warsaw which administered a sharp reverse to the Soviet 2nd Tank Army in the final days of July, was, according to this view, sufficient to stop the Red Army in its tracks on the Warsaw front. However, the units which reached Warsaw in late July 1944 were not part of Bagration, but instead advanced from Western Ukraine as part of the Lublin-Brest Operation, covering a much smaller distance. Those units were in fact able to operate quite effectively against German forces to the south and north of Warsaw during August and September, successfully securing bridgeheads over the Vistula and Narew rivers in those sectors. Despite that Soviet success, they remained inactive during August and the first half of September on the most direct route of approach towards Warsaw, through the suburb of Praga. Furthermore, once the Soviet forces seized Praga in mid-September 1944, only poorly supported units of the inexperienced 1st Polish Army were assigned to attempt the crossing of the river Vistula to aid the insurgents. Those crossings failed to establish a durable foothold on the left bank of the river, and caused considerable casualties among the Polish units involved. It is an open question whether an earlier Soviet effort using more experienced units with adequate support would have been able to reach and cross the Vistula in the Warsaw sector, and provide timely and effective support to the Polish units fighting in the main part of the city. The continued difficulty in accessing Soviet and British documents of the time makes it difficult for historians to answer this question with any degree of certainty.

== The airdrops ==
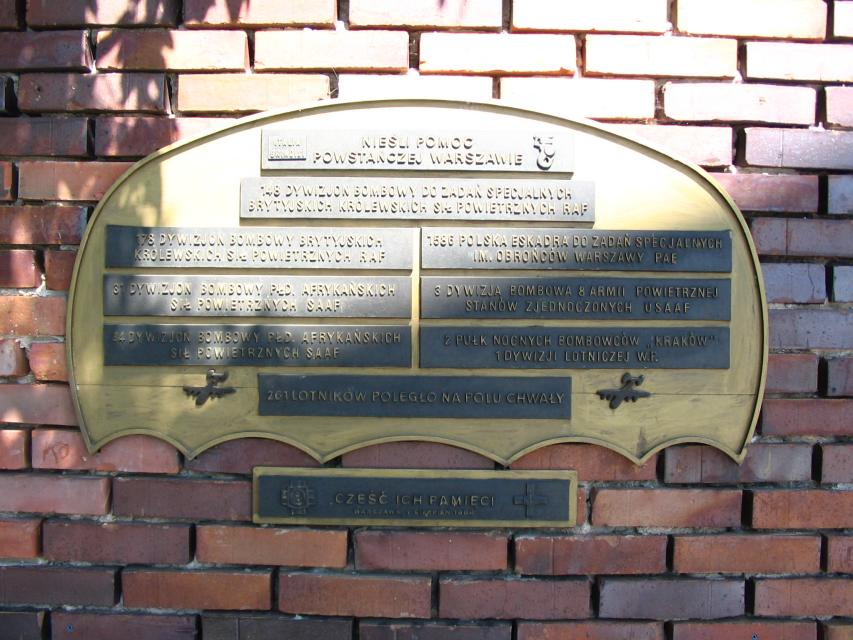
The monument shown in this photograph was erected to commemorate the Allied airmen who lost their lives over Warsaw.

From August 4 the Western Allies begun supporting the Warsaw Uprising with airdrops of munitions and other supplies. Initially the air raids were carried out mostly by 1586 Polish Flight of the PAF stationed in Bari and Brindisi in Italy flying Liberators, Halifaxes and Dakotas. Later on at the insistence of the Polish government-in-exile they were joined by the Liberators of 2 Wing - 31 and 34 Squadrons of the SAAF based at Foggia in Southern Italy, and Halifaxes, flown by 148 and 178 Squadrons of the RAF. The drops continued until September 21, delivering a total of 104 tons of supplies.

The Soviet Union did not give permission to the Allies for use of its airports for those supply operations and thus the planes were forced to use bases in the United Kingdom and Italy which reduced their carrying weight and number of sorties. The Allies specific request for the use of landing strips made on 20 August was denied by Stalin on 22 August. He referred to the resistance as "a handful of criminals".

United States Army Air Forces planes did not join the operation. On August 6, the Polish Ambassador called on the Lt. General McNarney to present an urgent request from the president of Poland for supplies to be furnished to the Polish Underground Army fighting the Germans in Warsaw. The Polish request asked that either General Eisenhower be authorized to send in supplies by air or that German munitions captured from the enemy by Soviet forces be sent to Warsaw from the United States bases in the Soviet Union. The Ambassador's memorandum also stated that arms and ammunition which Churchill had promised to parachute to Warsaw had not been sent because of technical difficulties. A response letter from the Joint Chiefs of Staff on August 7 stated that it "believed the Polish Ambassador should be informed that his appeal has been given most sympathetic consideration by the United States military authorities and that the matter has been referred to the Combined Chiefs of Staff for such action as is possible under the circumstances." In the annexes to the letter from the Joint Chiefs of Staff, it stated that in accordance with the agreed policy of the Combined Chiefs of Staff that supplies and equipment for the Polish Underground Forces is a British responsibility, and that the Polish request should be referred to the British Chiefs of Staff for such action as they may deem necessary and desirable. After Stalin's objections to support for the uprising, Churchill telegrammed Roosevelt on August 25 and proposed sending planes in defiance of Stalin and to 'see what happens'. Roosevelt replied on August 26: 'I do not consider it advantageous to the long-range general war prospect for me to join you in the proposed message to Uncle Joe'.

Although German air defence over the Warsaw area itself was almost non-existent, about 12% of the 296 planes taking part in the operations were lost because they had to fly 1,600 km out over heavily defended enemy territory and then back over the same route. Most of the drops were made during night, at no more than 100–300 feet altitude, and poor accuracy left many parachuted packages stranded behind German-controlled territory.

From September 13 on the Soviets began their own airdrop raids with supplies, and dropped about 55 tons in total. The drops continued until September 28. Finally on September 18 the Soviets allowed one USAAF flight of 110 B-17s of the 3 division Eighth Air Force to re-fuel and reload at Soviet airfields used in Operation Frantic, but it was too little too late. On their return flight to Foggia and then back to England the B-17's bombed the rail yards in Budapest, Hungary, which was still in German-occupied territory.

== Soviet participation: Berling landings on Powiśle ==
The role of the Red Army during the Warsaw Uprising remains controversial and is still disputed by some historians. The Uprising started when the Red Army appeared on the city's doorstep, and the Poles in Warsaw were counting on Soviet aid coming in a matter of days. This basic scenario of an uprising against the Germans launched a few days before the arrival of Allied forces played out successfully in a number of European capitals, notably Paris and Prague. However, despite standing for about 40 days less than 10 km from Warsaw's city center, and then moving even closer, to the right bank of the Vistula river a few hundred meters away from the main battle of the uprising during its last two weeks, the Red Army did not extend effective aid to the desperate city. Some Western historians, as well as the official line of the Communist regime in Poland before 1989, claimed that the Red Army, exhausted by its long advance on its way to Warsaw, lacked sufficient fighting power to overcome the German forces around Warsaw and extend effective aid to the Uprising. However, the consensus among most historians is that Stalin did not want to aid the Home Army in Warsaw, made up of likely opponents of the Communist regime that he wanted to impose on Poland after the war, and other Allied powers were reluctant to intervene against Stalin's will.

The Red Army reached the outskirts of Warsaw in the final days of July, 1944. The Soviet units belonged to the 1st Belorussian Front, participating in the Lublin-Brest Operation, between the Lvov-Sandomierz Operation on its left and Operation Bagration on its right. These two operations were colossal defeats for the German army and completely destroyed a large number of German formations. As a consequence, the Germans at this time were desperately trying to put together a new force to hold the line of the Vistula river, the last major river barrier between the Red Army and Germany proper, rushing in units in various stages of readiness from all over Europe. These units included a few high quality Panzer and SS Panzer divisions pulled from their refits, but also many infantry units of poor quality. In terms of combat power this scratch force was considerably inferior to what the Soviets had available. On the other hand, after their long advances in June and July the Soviet suffered from the usual difficulties with supply accompanying any long-range Soviet offensive that has advanced far beyond its starting line. The Soviet plan was to seize bridgeheads across the Vistula and the Narew rivers as jumping off points for the next offensive and then stop to resupply their units. This put Warsaw, straddling the river Vistula, right at the limit of planned Soviet advance. From the operational viewpoint seizing Warsaw was not a major priority for the Soviets, though clearly having possession of the city would be advantageous to them, especially if it could be captured with its infrastructure intact. However, it was not essential, as the Soviets already seized a series of convenient bridgeheads to the south of Warsaw, and were concentrating on defending them against vigorous German counterattacks. The Red Army was also gearing for a major thrust into the Balkans through Romania at around this time and a large proportion of Soviet resources was being sent in that direction.

In the initial Battle of Radzymin Soviet advance armored units of the 2nd Tank Army suffered a setback which prevented them from taking Warsaw from the march. It was the presence of Soviet tanks in nearby Wołomin that sealed the decision of the Home Army leaders in Warsaw to launch the uprising. As a result of the battle, the Soviet tank army was pushed out of Wołomin to the east of Warsaw and pushed back about 10 km. However, the defeat did not change the fact of the overwhelming Soviet superiority over the Germans in the sector. The Soviets retained their positions to the south-east of Warsaw along the Vistula river, barely 10 km away from the city center, at the outskirts of the Warsaw right bank suburb Praga. The Poles fighting in the Uprising were counting that the Soviet forces would seize Praga in a matter of days and then be in a position to have Red Army units cross to the left bank where the main battle of the Uprising was occurring and come to its aid.

However, on that line along the outskirts of Praga, on the most direct route of advance towards Warsaw, the Soviets stopped their advance and the front line did not move for the next 45 days. The sector was held by the understrength German 73rd Infantry Division, destroyed many times on the Eastern Front and recently reconstituted. The division, though weak, did not experience significant Soviet pressure during that period. At the same time, the Red Army was fighting intense battles to the south of Warsaw, to seize and maintain bridgeheads over the Vistula river, and to the north, to gain bridgeheads over the river Narew. It was on those sectors that the best Panzer and armored divisions that the Germans had were fighting. Despite that, both of these objectives have been mostly secured by early September. The inactivity of the Red Army directly in front of Warsaw elicited this reaction of amazement from Germans, recorded in the operations journal of German 9th Army on 16 August 1944: Contrary to our expectations, the enemy has halted all of their offensive actions alongside the entire front of the 9th Army.

Finally, on September 11, the Soviet 47th Army began its advance into Praga. The resistance by the German 73rd Division was weak and collapsed quickly, with the Soviets gaining control of the suburb by September 14. With the taking of Praga, the Soviet forces were now directly across the river from the Uprising fighting in left-bank Warsaw. If the Soviets had reached this stage in early August, the crossing of the river would have been easy, as the Poles then held considerable stretches of the riverfront. By mid-September a series of German attacks had reduced the Poles to holding one narrow stretch of the riverbank, in the district of Czerniakow. Nevertheless, the Soviets now made an attempt to aid the Uprising, but not by using Red Army units.

In the Praga area Polish units under command of General Zygmunt Berling (thus sometimes known as 'berlingowcy' - 'the Berling men'), the 1st Polish Army (1 Armia Wojska Polskiego) were in position. On the night of September 14/September 15 three patrols from landed on the shore of Czerniaków and Powiśle areas and made contacts with Home Army forces. Under heavy German fire only small elements of main units made it ashore (I and III battalions of 9th infantry regiment, 3rd Infantry Division). At the same time the commanders of the Red Army declined to support the Polish troops with artillery, tanks or bombers.

The Germans intensified their attacks on the Home Army positions near the river to prevent any further landings, which could seriously compromise their line of defence, but weren't able to make any significant advances for several days, while Polish forces held those vital positions in preparation for new expected wave of Soviet landings. Polish units from the eastern shore attempted several more landings, and during the next few days sustained heavy losses (including destruction of all landing boats and most of other river crossing equipment). Other Soviet units limited their assistance to sporadic and insignificant artillery and air support.

Shortly after the Berling landings, the Soviets decide to postpone all plans for a river crossing in Warsaw "for at least 4 months" and soon afterwards general Berling was relieved of his command. On the night of September 19, after no further attempts from the other side of the river were made and the promised evacuation of wounded did not take place, Home Army soldiers and landed elements of Wojsko Polskie were forced to begin a retreat from their positions on the bank of the river.

Out of approximately 3,000 men who made it ashore only around 900 made it back to the eastern shores of Vistula, approximately 600 of them seriously wounded.

== Closed or destroyed military archives ==
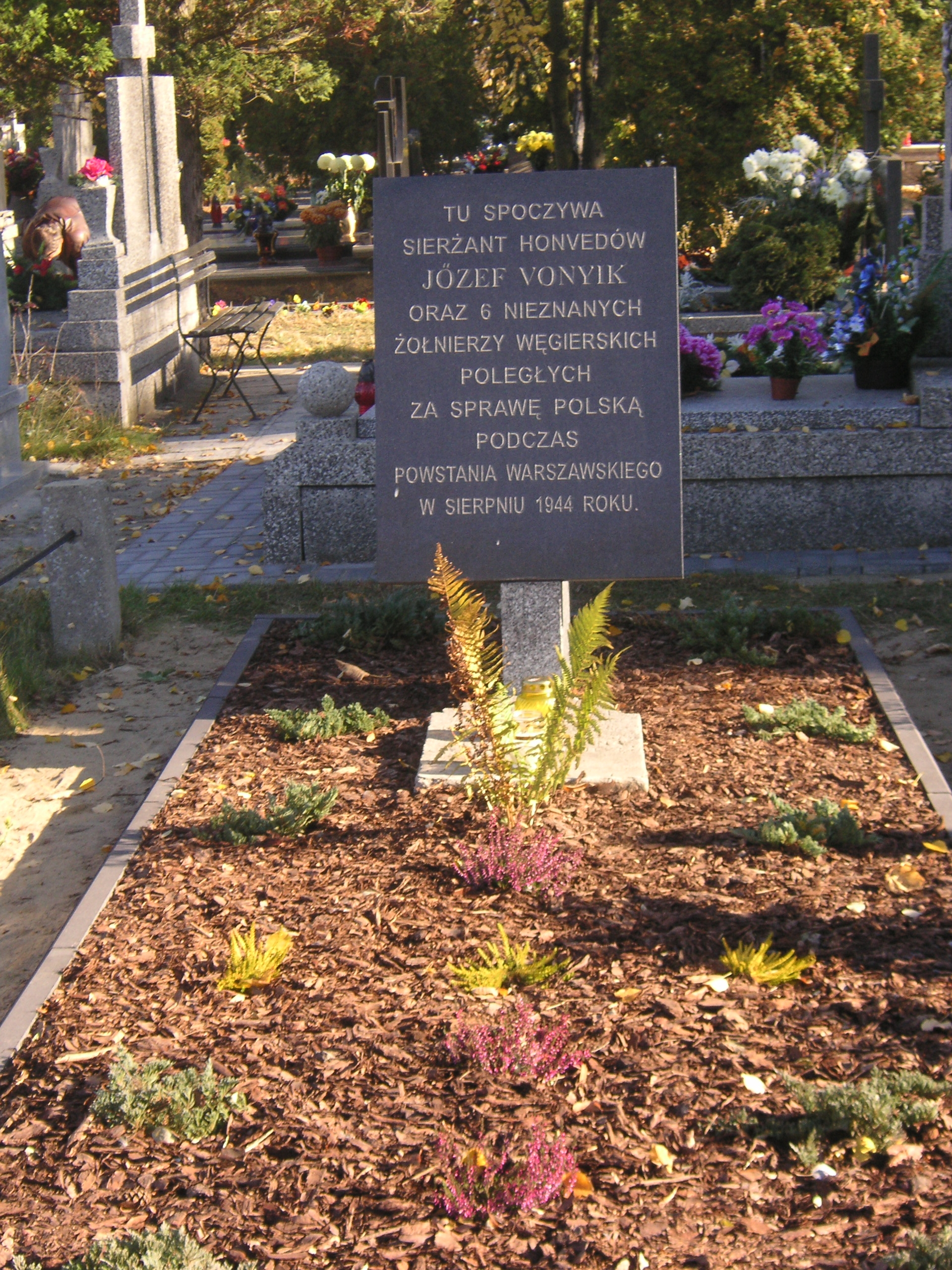
A grave of a Royal Hungarian Army captain and 6 of his men who fell fighting on the Polish side during the Uprising (the epitaph says: "Here lies Honved Sergeant Jözef Vonyik and 6 unidentified Hungarian soldiers who fell fighting for the Polish cause during the Warsaw Uprising, August 1944")

Research into the lack of support of the Warsaw Uprising is (according to historians such as Norman Davies) currently very difficult due to lack of access to archives. For records relating to the period, currently both the United Kingdom archives and Russian archives (where the majority of Soviet archives are kept) remain mostly closed to the public. Further complicating the matter is the United Kingdom's claim that they accidentally destroyed the archives of the Polish Government in Exile.

== See also ==
- Jewish partisans
- Jewish resistance in German-occupied Europe
- Auschwitz bombing debate
- Western betrayal
- Appeasement
- Battle of Radzymin (1944)
