= Maxim Sinenko =

Soviet Army lieutenant general of tank forces (1902–1991)

Maxim Denisovich Sinenko
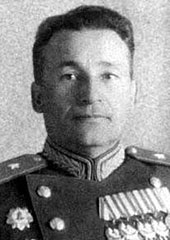
- Sinenko, c. 1945
- Born: 27 April 1902; Novovladimirovka, Dneprovsky Uyezd Taurida Governorate, Russian Empire
- Died: 10 February 1991 (aged 88) Moscow, Soviet Union
- Allegiance: Soviet Union
- Branch: Red Army (later Soviet Army)
- Service years: 1924–1952
- Rank: Lieutenant general of Tank Forces
- Commands: 3rd Tank Corps; 3rd Guards Tank Corps; 5th Guards Tank Army
- Conflicts: Winter War; World War II
- Awards: Order of Lenin; Order of the Red Banner (4)

Maxim Denisovich Sinenko (Russian: Максим Денисович Синенко; 27 April 1902 – 10 February 1991) was a Soviet Army lieutenant general of tank forces.

== Early life and prewar service ==
A Ukrainian, Maxim Denisovich Sinenko was born on 27 April 1902 in the village of Novovladimirovka, Bekhtyersky volost, Dneprovsky Uyezd, Taurida Governorate. He was conscripted into the Red Army on 20 June 1924 on a Central Committee of the Communist Party of Ukraine direction and became a company politruk in the 297th Rifle Regiment of the 99th Rifle Division of the Ukrainian Military District. In November of that year he was selected as secretary of the regimental party bureau, and in October 1925 appointed instructor for party organizational work of the division political department. Sinenko transferred to the 100th Rifle Division in December 1926, where he served as commissar of the 298th Rifle Regiment and then the 100th Artillery Regiment from November 1927. In May 1931 he entered the Red Army Military Academy of Mechanization and Motorization, and upon his graduation in December 1936 was appointed commander of a tank battalion of the 19th Mechanized Brigade of the Leningrad Military District. From November 1937 Sinenko studied at the General Staff Academy and upon his graduation in June 1939 was appointed chief of staff of the 6th Tank Brigade (later renumbered as the 20th). In this position he fought in the Winter War. Sinenko commanded the 17th Separate Light Tank Brigade of the Transcaucasian Military District from April 1940 and continued in command when it was expanded into the 54th Tank Division of the 28th Mechanized Corps in April 1941.

== World War II ==
After Operation Barbarossa began, the 54th Tank Division covered the Soviet border in the Transcaucasus. In late July and early August the 28th Mechanized Corps was used to form the 47th Army. Colonel Sinenko led the division in the Anglo-Soviet invasion of Iran in August. In October he was appointed commander of the 55th Tank Brigade, which joined the Transcaucasian Front. From January 1942 the brigade fought in fierce fighting in the Battle of the Kerch Peninsula. Between May and September Sinenko served as deputy chief of the Auto-Armored Directorate for the combat employment of tank forces of the North Caucasian Front. During this period, he was simultaneously representative of the North Caucasian Front in Stalingrad by a directive of the Red Army General Staff.

In October 1942, Sinenko was appointed commander of the 3rd Tank Corps in the Reserve of the Supreme High Command. He was promoted to major general of tank forces on 10 November. The corps was sent to the Southwestern Front in January 1943 to fight in Operation Gallop, during which it captured Kramatorsk and Druzhkovka. In mid-1943 the corps fought in the Battle of Kursk as part of the 2nd Tank Army. From October, Sinenko served as chief of the Combat Training Directorate, and from April 1944 was First Deputy Chief of the Main Directorate for Formation and Combat Training of the Armored and Mechanized Forces of the Red Army. In September 1944 he was appointed first deputy commander-in-chief of the 5th Guards Tank Army. On October, during the Memel Offensive, Sinenko became acting commander of the 3rd Guards Tank Corps when corps commander Lieutenant General Aleksei Panfilov was replaced due to illness. Under his command, the corps crossed the Minija and fought its way to Memel. He was credited with "skillful organization" of the repulse of German tank counterattacks as the corps held its line before infantry units could catch up to its advance. Sinenko returned to his duties as army first deputy commander by 16 October after Panfilov recovered.

The 5th Guards Tank Army fought in the East Prussian offensive as part of the 2nd Belorussian Front and the 3rd Belorussian Front. Its units entered combat in the sector of the German lines that the 48th Army had broken through on 17 January 1945 and by the end of the day had reached the Mława fortifications. By the morning of 19 January the army had defeated the garrison of the latter and developing the advance on Elbing reached the Frisches Haff by 25 January, cutting off the communications of Army Group Centre. In late January and February, the army repulsed German counterattacks attempting to push back the Soviet troops from the coast and restore land communications. From March 1945 to the end of the war Sinenko commanded the 5th Guards Tank Army. In early April, in conjunction with the 98th Rifle Corps and 1st Polish Tank Brigade, the army fought in fierce fighting to eliminate German forces in the Vistula Spit, where it remained until the end of the war.

== Postwar ==
After the end of the war, Sinenko, promoted to lieutenant general of tank forces on 11 July 1945, became head of the 1st Ulyanovsk Tank School in January 1946, and from July 1948 was inspector general of the Armed and Mechanized Forces of the Main Inspectorate of the Soviet Armed Forces before retiring in August 1952. He lived in Moscow, where he died on 10 February 1991.

== Awards and decorations ==
Sinenko was a recipient of the following awards and decorations:

- Order of Lenin
- Order of the Red Banner (4)
- Order of Kutuzov, 1st class
- Order of Kutuzov, 2nd class
- Order of the Patriotic War, 1st class
- Medals
- Foreign orders and medals
