= 24th Tank Division (Soviet Union) =

Tank division of the Soviet military

- Active: I Formation: 1941 II Formation: 1957–1960
- Country: Soviet Union
- Branch: Soviet Army
- Type: Armor
- Garrison/HQ: Dobele (1957–1960)
- Engagements: World War II: Baltic Operation; Leningrad Strategic Defensive

The 24th Tank Division was a tank division of the Soviet Union, formed twice. The division's first formation was formed in the spring of 1941 and fought in the Leningrad Strategic Defensive before being broken up into two smaller brigades. The division's second formation was originally formed in 1956 as the 24th Heavy Tank Division and became a regular tank division in 1957. It became a training division in 1960 and was redesignated the 54th District Training Center in 1987 before being disbanded in 1995.

== History ==
=== First formation ===
Formation of the division began in March 1941. It was part of the 10th Mechanized Corps. It was based in Pushkin and Slutsk. The division was formed from the 2nd Light Tank Brigade. 2nd Light Tank Brigade commander Alexey Rodin became its acting commander. In late May, Colonel M.I. Chesnokov took command of the division.

When Operation Barbarossa began on 22 June 1941, the division was ordered to combat readiness. 13 tanks from the 49th Tank Regiment were sent to Pskov, where they remained until redeployment to the Kandalaksha area. The remaining 20 BT-5 and BT-7 light tanks were not in full working order. By 24 June, all of these tanks were put in full working order, sent to the rail station and moved to the Karelian Isthmus. The 10th Mechanized Corps became part of the 23rd Army reserve east of Vyborg. The division was moved to those positions with its headquarters in Ihantala by 1 July. Due to the German advance on Leningrad from the south, the division transferred to the Luga Operational Group and defended positions in the Luga River area during mid-July.

By September 1941 the 24th Tank Division had been dissolved and reformed as the 124th Tank Battalion and 12th Tank Regiment.

On 22 September, the division was broken up into the 124th Tank Brigade and the 125th Tank Brigade.

=== Second formation ===
On 9 June 1956, the 24th Heavy Tank Division was formed at Kubinka. It included the 177th, 193rd and 207th Heavy Tank Regiments and the 1265th Anti-Aircraft Artillery Regiment. It was part of the Moscow Military District. On 25 June 1957, it was converted to a regular tank division. At the same time, the division moved to Dobele and became part of the Baltic Military District. The 285th Guards Motor Rifle Regiment joined the division from the 40th Tank Division. In August 1960, it became a training division. On 19 February 1962, the 381st Separate Training Equipment Maintenance and Recovery Battalion was activated, along with a training missile battalion. In March 1963, the 285th Guards Regiment was replaced by the 3rd Guards Motor Rifle Division's 13th Guards Motor Rifle Regiment. The chemical defence company became the 556th Separate Training Chemical Defence Battalion in 1972. On 14 September 1987, the division became the 54th District Training Center. It became part of the North Western Group of Forces in November 1991. In June 1992, the 13th Guards Training Motor Rifle Regiment was detached and became the 25th Guards Motor Rifle Brigade.

The new 25th Guards Motor Rifle Brigade remained in Ādaži until November 1993, when it moved to Strugi Krasnye.

The 54th District Training Centre was disbanded in 1995.
