= Mikhail Panov =

- Lieutenant General Mikhail Panov
- Born: 21 November 1901; Ovchinikov, Vitebsk Governorate, Russian Empire
- Died: 8 May 1979 (aged 77); Moscow, Soviet Union
- Burial place: Kuntsevo Cemetery
- Military career
- Allegiance: Soviet Union (1919–1967)
- Service years: 1919–1967
- Rank: Lieutenant General
- Commands: Red Army
- Conflicts: Russian Civil War; World War II
- Awards: Hero of the Soviet Union; Order of Lenin (2); Order of the Red Banner (4); Order of Suvorov, 1st Class; Order of Suvorov, 2nd Class (2); Order of Kutuzov, 2nd Class

Mikhail Feodorovich Panov (Russian: Михаил Фёдорович Панов; 21 November 1901, in Ovchinikov, Vitebsk Governorate, Russian Empire – 8 May 1979, in Moscow, Soviet Union) was a Soviet general.

== Biography ==
=== Early life ===
Born to a peasant family, Panov worked in a St. Petersburg factory from a young age. In 1919, he joined both the Communist Party and the Red Army, participating in the Civil War. In 1924 he attended a tank commanders school and, in 1928, underwent advanced infantry officers training. He graduated from the Stalin Academy for Motorization and Mechanization in 1938, assuming command over the 48th Light Tank Brigade in November of that year. In March 1941, he was appointed commander of the 33rd Tank Division.

=== World War II ===
On the eve of the German invasion, the division was still organizing in Sokółka. It was part of the 3rd Army's 11th Mechanized Corps. When the Germans attacked, Panov launched a hasty counter-offensive. Eventually, with many other formations, the division was encircled in the Battle of Białystok–Minsk and practically wiped out. Panov broke out, reaching Soviet lines. In October, he was made an assistant to the Inspector-General of the Armored Automobiles Directorate.

In November 1942, Panov was sent to Tambov, where the 2nd Guards Army was forming, and assigned to command its Armored and Mechanized formations. On 15 December, the Army was sent to Stalingrad, halting von Manstein's assault and playing a pivotal role in Operation Little Saturn.

On 26 April 1943, Panov replaced the 1st Guards Don Tank Corps's commander, who was killed. He attained the rank of Major General on 7 June 1943. Under his leadership, the corps took part in Operation Kutuzov, the Lower Dnieper Offensive and the Gomel-Rechitsa Offensive, as part of the Don, Central, and Belorussian Fronts.

During Operation Bagration, the Corps crossed the Polesia marshes in harsh conditions, spearheading the Bobruysk Offensive. On 2 July 1944, it met with 2nd Guards Tank Corps of the 3rd Belorussian Front outside Minsk, encircling the German forces inside the city. Later, the Corps took part in the fighting in the Narew area, in the Vistula-Oder Offensive and in the East-Pomeranian Campaign. It was one of the first Soviet units to reach the Elbe. The commander was promoted to Lieutenant General on 19 April 1945.

=== Later years ===
After the war, Panov was awarded the title Hero of the Soviet Union (Medal no. 7314), on 29 May. He continued to command the Corps until June 1946, when he took over the 4th Guards Kantemirovskaya Tank Division. He graduated from the General Staff Academy in 1958. From 1961 until his retirement at 1967 he headed a faculty in the Malinovsky Academy.

== Honours and awards ==
- "Gold Star" Medal Hero of the Soviet Union
- Two Orders of Lenin
- Order of the Red Banner, four times
- Order of Suvorov, 1st class and 2nd class, twice
- Order of Kutuzov, 2nd class
