= 16th Guards Tank Division =

Tank division of the Soviet military

16th Guards Tank Division (1965–1997) 9th Guards Tank Division (1945–1965) 9th Guards Tank Corps (1944–1945) 3rd Tank Corps (1942–1944)
- Active: 1942–1997
- Country: Soviet Union; Russia
- Branch: Red Army/Soviet Army; Russian Ground Forces
- Type: Division
- Role: Armored
- Garrison/HQ: Markovsky
- Engagements: World War II
- Decorations: Order of Lenin Order of the Red Banner Order of Suvorov
- Battle honours: Uman

Commanders
- Notable commanders: Nikolai Vedeneyev

The 16th Guards Tank Division was a tank division of the Soviet Army and later the Russian Ground Forces.

The division traced its lineage back to the World War II 3rd Tank Corps, formed in the spring of 1942. The corps received its baptism of fire in the Zhizdra-Bolkhov Offensive during the summer and spent the fall in reserve. In early 1943, the corps fought in Operation Gallop and was destroyed in the Third Battle of Kharkov in late February. The corps was rebuilt in the following months and joined the 2nd Tank Army in June. The corps fought in the Battle of Kursk in July and in the Chernigov-Pripyat Offensive in August and September. In early 1944, it fought in the Korsun-Shevchenkovsky Offensive and the Uman–Botoșani Offensive. For its actions in the latter, the corps received the honorific "Uman" and the Order of Suvorov. During the summer of 1944, the corps fought in the Lublin–Brest Offensive, advancing into Poland. For its actions in the offensive, the corps received the Order of the Red Banner and in November became a guards unit, the 9th Guards Tank Corps, along with the rest of the army. The corps fought in the Vistula–Oder Offensive and the East Pomeranian Offensive in early 1945. For its actions, the corps received the Order of Lenin in April. The corps then fought in the Berlin Offensive, ending the war in the German capital.

In the summer of 1945, the corps became a tank division and was relocated to Neustrelitz, becoming part of the Group of Soviet Forces in Germany (GSFG). In 1965, the division was renumbered as the 16th Guards Tank Division. The division served with the GSFG through the Cold War and after the Dissolution of the Soviet Union in 1992 began a withdrawal to Russia which was completed in 1993. The division remained at Markovsky, Perm Krai until its 1997 disbandment, when it became a storage base. The storage base was disbanded in 2009.

== World War II ==
=== Formation ===
The formation of the 3rd Tank Corps began on 31 March and ended on 10 May 1942 in Tula. 31 March was considered its anniversary. Major General Dmitry Mostovenko became the corps commander. In April, the 50th and 51st Tank Brigade joined the corps. The 47th Tank Brigade and 3rd Motor Rifle Brigade also became part of the corps, which became part of the Bryansk Front. On 28 April, the corps had 138 tanks, including 30 KV tanks, 60 T-34 tanks, and 48 T-60 light tanks.

=== Zhizdra-Bolkhov and Kozelsk Offensives ===
The corps became part of the Western Front reserve on 28 June. On 5 July, it was subordinated to the 61st Army as its exploitation force for the upcoming Zhizdra-Bolkhov Offensive. The offensive was a Soviet counterattack against the German 2nd Panzer Army defending the northern part of the Oryol salient, and was an attempt to divert German troops from their attacks on the Bryansk Front and also to draw the 4th Panzer Army away from Voronezh. Despite the 61st Army failing to achieve a breakthrough in the direction of Bolkhov when the offensive began on 5 July, the 3rd Tank Corps with 192 tanks was committed to the fight two days later. Attacking heavily fortified positions, the corps suffered heavy losses from anti-tank fire. 61st Army's attack was halted five days later without making gains. From the end of the offensive on 10 July to 11 August, the corps was located in the Bely area. From 19 August it was under the operational control of the 3rd Tank Army.

From 22 August, the corps fought in the Kozelsk Offensive with the rest of the army, attempting to eliminate the German salient near Kozelsk. The offensive was unsuccessful due to fuel shortages and German air superiority, and ended with only 200 tanks remaining in the army. The offensive was halted on 9 September, but before that, on 8 September, the 3rd Tank Corps had been withdrawn to the Reserve of the Supreme High Command. Four days later, the corps moved to the Kubinka area for rebuilding. On 4 September, Colonel (promoted to Major General on 10 November) Maxim Sinenko took command of the corps after Mostovenko was promoted to command the Western Front's Armored and Mechanized Forces. The 3rd Motor Rifle Brigade was converted into a mechanized brigade and transferred to the 3rd Mechanized Corps on 10 September. In early October, the corps was relocated to the Kaluga area. All three tank brigades received new T-34s, which became part of the first and second companies of each tank battalion. The third companies of the battalions were re-equipped with the T-70 light tank. The corps conducted training during its time in the reserve. On 10 December, the 57th Motor Rifle Brigade arrived from the Ural Military District, replacing the 3rd Motor Rifle Brigade. On 24 December, the corps received the order to prepare to move by rail to the Southwestern Front. Three days later, the corps began its rail journey to the front.

=== Operation Gallop ===
On 28 December, the corps became part of the Southwestern Front. At the time it had 164 tanks, including 98 T-34s, 42 T-70s, and 24 T-60s. The corps unloaded at the Kalach rail station and from there its tank brigades conducted a 300 kilometer march to its positions for the forthcoming offensive. From 22 January it was under the operational control of the 6th Army. On 25 January, it became part of Group Popov. The corps fought in Operation Gallop, a Soviet counteroffensive after the Battle of Stalingrad, which attempted to encircle all German troops east of Donetsk. Group Popov was assigned to advance southwards 270 kilometers and capture Mariupol, which would cut off Army Group Don. The corps was given the mission of cooperating with the 57th Guards Rifle Division in advancing southwest from the 6th Army sector to Sloviansk, which was to be captured by 4 February. The corps would then join the 4th Guards Tank Corps in an advance on Kramatorsk. In early February, the Soviet advance was blocked by the resistance of the 7th Panzer Division in Sloviansk. The tank corps of Group Popov were brought in as reinforcements, including the 3rd, and they were able to encircle the city, which fell after holding out for more than a week. Following the advance of the 38th Guards Rifle Division, the corps reached the area northeast of Sloviansk by 4 February. The corps was then ordered to reinforce the 4th Guards Tank Corps, dug in at Kramatorsk and fighting attacks from the 7th Panzer Division. The 3rd Tank Corps joined the 4th Guards at Kramatorsk on 5 February. Both corps numbered a total of 60 tanks at this time. The German troops were reinforced by the 333rd Infantry Division, which claimed to have inflicted heavy losses on both corps, which now defended Kramatorsk with their tanks.

On 7 February, the 3rd Tank Corps and 4th Guards Tank Corps were ordered to destroy German troops at Sloviansk and Kostiantynivka, and then advance on Krasnoarmiysk and encircle Stalino from the west. On 11 February the 3rd Tank Corps took over the defenses of the 4th Guards Tank Corps as the latter advanced on Krasnoarmiysk. Attacks from the 333rd Infantry Division recaptured eastern Kramatorsk from the 3rd Tank Corps, and the corps stopped an assault from the north of the city by Group Balck on 13 February. On the evening of 18 February the corps was ordered to turn over its positions at Kramatorsk to arriving Soviet infantry units and move south to Krasnoarmiysk by 20 February to assist the 4th Guards Tank Corps. Before the 3rd could reach the positions of the 4th Guards, the 11th Panzer Division completed the encirclement of the 4th Guards by capturing Novo-Alekseyevsky and Aleksandrovka, blocking the advance of the 3rd Tank Corps on 19 February. The 4th Guards held out in Krasnoarmiysk until the night of 20–21 February when its remnants broke out.

=== Third Battle of Kharkov ===
The corps with twelve tanks was pushed back by the German counterattack which began the Third Battle of Kharkov on 19 February, suffering heavy losses to the 11th Panzer Division in the Andreyevka area. The corps was forced to retreat northwards and was attacked by SS Division Wiking at Novopetrykivka on 22 February. By 24 February the corps and the remnants of the Mobile Group were providing limited tank support to the defensive line of the 195th Rifle Division northwest of Stepanivka. By the end of 26 February the corps had been forced back by SS Wiking's attacks to the area northwest of Barvinkove, retreating along with the 10th Tank Corps. Two days later it defended positions to the east of the 195th Rifle Division, south of Balakliia and the Donets River, against the 17th Panzer Division. Two brigades of the corps defended Barvinkove along with remnants of Group Popov and the 1st Guards Army until the German breakthrough to the Donets on 28 February. The remnants of the 3rd Tank Corps then withdrew across the ice over the Donets.

=== Kursk ===
On 11 March the corps was transferred to Stavka reserve for rebuilding in the Alexeyevsky District, Belgorod Oblast. In April, the 234th Mortar Regiment, 881st Anti-Tank Artillery Regiment, the 121st Anti-Aircraft Artillery Regiment, and 74th Motorcycle Battalion joined the corps. On 1 June it became part of the 2nd Tank Army. The corps fought in the Battle of Kursk during the summer of 1943. The corps was positioned in the center of the 13th Army sector behind the third defensive line.

=== First Jassy–Kishinev Offensive ===
On 1 April 1944, 3rd Tank Corps was in 2nd Tank Army, and had recently come under command of Lieutenant General of Tank Forces Vasily Mishulin. 2nd Ukrainian Front was advancing towards the Romanian border in the culmination of the Uman–Botoșani Offensive. On the morning of 8 April the Front commander, Marshal Ivan Konev, ordered an advance towards the Romanian town of Târgu Frumos. 3rd Tank made up part of the shock group, despite having long columns of tanks and trucks stretched out tens of kilometers to the rear along the mud-clogged roads. Late in the afternoon of 9 April, the forward detachments of 3rd and 16th Tank Corps, which were already locked in a struggle north of Podu Iloaiei with a battle group of 24th Panzer Division, were reinforced by the 78th and 180th Rifle Divisions. Despite this, the German defenses held. By 12 April, 2nd Tank Army had managed to concentrate about 15 km north of Podu Iloaiei, and Konev ordered an attack to eliminate the salient held by 24th Panzer. This attack, which did not involve 3rd Tank, was driven back to its starting positions. The next day, 3rd Tank Corps, with about 80 tanks supported by its own 57th Motor Rifle Brigade and the 93rd Guards Rifle Division made modest gains until being counterattacked by two armored battle groups against its flanks, which brought the assault to a halt and temporarily ended the Soviet offensive on this sector.

Konev planned a second drive on Târgu Frumos to start on 27 April, but due to a complex regrouping of his forces this had to be pushed back to 2 May. The operation was preceded by a diversion on 25 April in the direction of Jassy, in which the 103rd Tank Brigade took part. Prior to the real offensive, by 1 May the Corps was reinforced with a complete heavy tank penetration regiment and a heavy self-propelled artillery regiment, so that it fielded a total of 50 tanks and self-propelled guns, including 27 T-34s in its organic tank brigades, 5 IS-85 tanks in the attached 8th Guards Penetration Tank Regiment, and 18 ISU-152s in the 375th Heavy Self-Propelled Artillery Regiment. The mission of 2nd Tank Army was to support 27th Army's penetration, capture Târgu Frumos by enveloping the town from the east, and to exploit by rolling up the German/Romanian left wing and capture Jassy by enveloping the city from the southwest.

The attack sector was still being defended primarily by 24th Panzer, supported by elements of the Grossdeutchland Division. After a 30-minute artillery preparation, and against stubborn resistance, 35th Guards Rifle Corps, in coordination with 2nd Tank Army units, wedged into the German defenses and advanced 4 – 6 km along the Târgu Frumos axis by 1100 hrs., at which point counterattacks by infantry and up to 70 tanks pressed the attackers back somewhat. Following this:

"The units of the 3rd Tank Corps fought with mixed success in the vicinity of Hills 256 and 197 [seven kilometres north of Târgu Frumos] and the northern outskirts of Cucuteni throughout the entire day."

In the late afternoon the Corps halted its attacks to rest and regroup and, if possible, resume its assault the next morning. However, the Germans also regrouped overnight, bringing up elements of the 3rd SS Panzer Division from LVII Panzer Corps reserves. On the morning of 3 May, 3rd Tank Corps was concentrated on a 1.5 km sector west of the Hirlau–Târgu Frumos road. Konev was still confident that he had sufficient armor to, if not envelop Jassy, at least take the illusive prize of Târgu Frumos. But the German strength in both tanks and anti-tank guns denied any success to the new assault. Tanks that passed through the German infantry lines were shot up by anti-tank assets in the rear. While elements of 2nd Tank Army penetrated for a second time to the northern outskirts of the objective, losses forced them back to the start line by the afternoon. A further effort on 4 May gained nothing, and by day's end Konev had given up all hopes of resuming his offensive. In the course of the fighting from 1–8 May, the Corps reported the non-recoverable loss of 21 tanks and SUs from the total of 50 at start. The Corps further reported:

"During the combat from 2 through 5 May 1944, the Corps' units caused the following enemy losses: 26 tanks destroyed, including ten T-6 (Tiger) tanks, and 14 tanks damaged, including nine T-6. Twenty-five guns were destroyed... six prisoners, ten light machine guns and six heavy machine guns were seized."

The Corps also reported personnel losses of 80 men killed and 321 men wounded.

Near the end of May Konev planned to renew his offensive by regrouping 2nd Tank Army and other forces north and northwest of Jassy. This was pre-empted on 30 May when German Eighth Army launched Operation "Sonja" to drive Soviet forces back from the city. 3rd Tank Corps was in a laager around the town of Focuri when the attack began; at this point the entire tank army was fielding about 60 tanks in total, including about ten IS models. "Sonja" was halted on the third day after making gains, but was soon followed by Operation "Katja" on 2 June. At mid-morning that day, the Corps was ordered to the vicinity of Movileni Station, where it fended off an attack by forward elements of Grossdeutchland. By nightfall stable defenses had been established just south of the station along with remnants of 202nd and 206th Rifle Divisions. By 5 June, 3rd Tank was aiding in the defense at Epureni when "Katja" came to a halt. These two operations rocked the Soviet forces enough to end any immediate plans for a continued offensive of their own; this sector would remain quiet until 20 August, when the 2nd Jassy-Kishinev Offensive began.

== Postwar ==
By 1 December 1945, in accordance with a directive dated 10 June 1945, the corps became the 9th Guards Tank Division. The division was stationed at Neustrelitz, and around the same time the 2nd Guards Tank Army became a mechanized army. In 1957, the army became a tank army again. On 11 January 1965, the division was renumbered as the 16th Guards Tank Division to "preserve historical traditions" and in celebration of the 20th anniversary of the end of World War II. In 1989, the 67th Guards Tank Regiment became the 723rd Guards Motor Rifle Regiment. The Soviet Union was dissolved in 1991, resulting in the withdrawal of remaining units from Germany. In 1992, the 723rd was relocated to Chaykovsky, Perm Krai and the rest of the division followed soon after. By 30 June 1993, the relocation was completed and the division was based in Markovsky, Perm Krai. Markovsky was purpose-built for the division to provide housing to its soldiers, and construction was paid for by the German government under the withdrawal agreements. In March 1995, the 723rd Regiment was sent to Chechnya to fight in the First Chechen War. At Grozny, the regiment was used to form the 205th Separate Motor Rifle Brigade. In March 1997, the division was reorganized into the 5967th Guards Weapons and Equipment Storage Base for armored troops. The former artillery regiment of the 90th Guards Tank Division became part of the storage base. In December 2009, the storage base was disbanded.
