= 9th Tank Division (Soviet Union) =

Military unit

9th Tank Division (1940–1941) 9th Tank Corps (1942–1945) 9th Tank Division (1945–1957) 13th Heavy Tank Division (1957–1965) 9th Tank Division (1965–1991)
- Active: 1940–1941; 1942–1991
- Country: Soviet Union
- Branch: Red Army; Soviet Army
- Type: Armored
- Size: Division, Tank Corps
- Garrison/HQ: Riesa, East Germany
- Nickname: Arrow
- Engagements: World War II
- Decorations: Order of the Red Banner; Order of Suvorov, 2nd Class
- Honorifics: Bobruisk; Berlin

Commanders
- Notable commanders: Semyon Bogdanov

The 9th Bobruisk-Berlin Red Banner Order of Suvorov Tank Division was the designation of two separate formations of the Soviet Army. The original 9th Tank Division was formed in 1940 and later reorganized into a different division. During World War II, the Soviet Army formed the 9th Tank Corps, which was renamed the 9th Tank Division after the defeat of Germany in 1945. This second instance of the 9th Tank Division served with the Group of Soviet Forces in Germany from 1945 until about 1991, when it was disbanded.

== 9th Tank Division (1940) and follow on units ==
The 9th Tank Division was a formation of the Red Army that saw action briefly in 1941. It was formed in Mary, Turkmen SSR, Central Asian Military District in the summer of 1940. In April 1941 the division joined the newly formed 27th Mechanised Corps. However, on 28 June 1941 the division was separated from its parent corps and re-designated the 104th Tank Division (ru:104-я танковая дивизия (СССР)). The 104th Tank Division underwent its own organizational evolution, becoming first the 145th Tank Brigade and later the 43rd Guards Tank Brigade (which was later designated a "heavy tank brigade" in 1945).

The 145th Tank Brigade was destroyed at Vyazma in October 1941.

== 9th Tank Corps ==
9th Tank Corps route of march, 1942-1945

The 9th Tank Corps was formed on 12 May 1942 in the Moscow Military District. It fought in Russia, Poland, and Germany until 1945. In 1945 the 9th Tank Corps was redesignated the 9th Tank Division.

=== 1942 ===
Initial Composition:

- 23rd Tank Brigade (T34-76)
- 95th Tank Brigade (T34-76)
- 187th Tank Brigade(T34-76)
- 10th Motorized Rifle Brigade

The 9th Tank Corps participated in the offensive of the left wing of the Western Front in the summer of 1942. On 7 June the corps was stationed in the area of Voymirovo, Barankovo (Kaluga Oblast), Kochukovo and Sukhoy Sot (east of Kirov). On the orders of the commander of the 16th Army, the corps had the task, by 6 July 1942, to enter into the breach 'Black' to exploit the advantageous situation in the direction of Oslinka, Zhizdra, and Orlya. The corps entered combat only on the evening of 7 July. Due to poor reconnaissance and the movement of the first echelons, the corps became mired in a swamp. The corps suffered heavy losses, such that one of the brigades lost 50% of its tanks. The entire night of 7–8 July was consumed by the recovery of mired vehicles. In general, commitment of the corps did not influence the battle, and on 14 July, the corps went on the defence.

In August 1942, the corps took part in a counterattack against the enemy in the area of Sukhinichi and Kozel'sk.

In September 1942 the 10th Motorized Brigade was removed to form a mechanized unit. The brigade was finally replaced in November 1942 with the assignment of the 8th Motorized Brigade from the 8th Tank Corps. The corps remained in reserve until February 1943. During this time the 187th Tank Brigade left the corps and was replaced by the 108th Tank Brigade.

=== 1943 ===
In March 1943 the corps was transferred to the Central Front, on the northern edge of the Kursk Salient in the area of Arseniyevsky, Trubitsyn, and Sergeevskie. On 7 May 1943 the corps was reinforced with more T34-76 Tanks.

It was sent to the front line on 7 July 1943 reinforced with the 1454th (SU-122) and 1455th (SU-76) Assault Gun Regiments. On the afternoon of 8 July, the corps entered combat. On 15 July, the leading elements fought their way into Buzuluk, not far from Maloarkhangelsk. On the same day, the corps broke into Maloarhangelsk. On 1 August, the corps led the offensive 14 kilometers south of Kromy in the settlements of Gostoml' (15 kilometers south of Kromy) and Shosse. On 2 August the corps reached the area of Parnyy, nine kilometers south of Kromy. By the end of 3 August, the fighting was at the Kolki-Sharikino road bend. On 4 August the corps crossed the Kroma River and was fighting to expand a bridgehead near Glinki-Leshnya 11 kilometers southwest of Kromy. The corps was temporarily reinforced by the 1540th (SU-152) Heavy SU Regiment during August.

During the Chernigov-Pripyat Offensive the corps was introduced into battle in a surprise attack on 27 August south of Sevsk. On 30 August the 9th Tank Corps took part in the liberation of Hlukhiv, then continued the offensive in a south-westerly direction until 7 September, with the corps located on the Desna River. 9th Tank Corps was finally withdrawn for rest, reequipping, and reorganization in November 1943.

=== 1944 ===
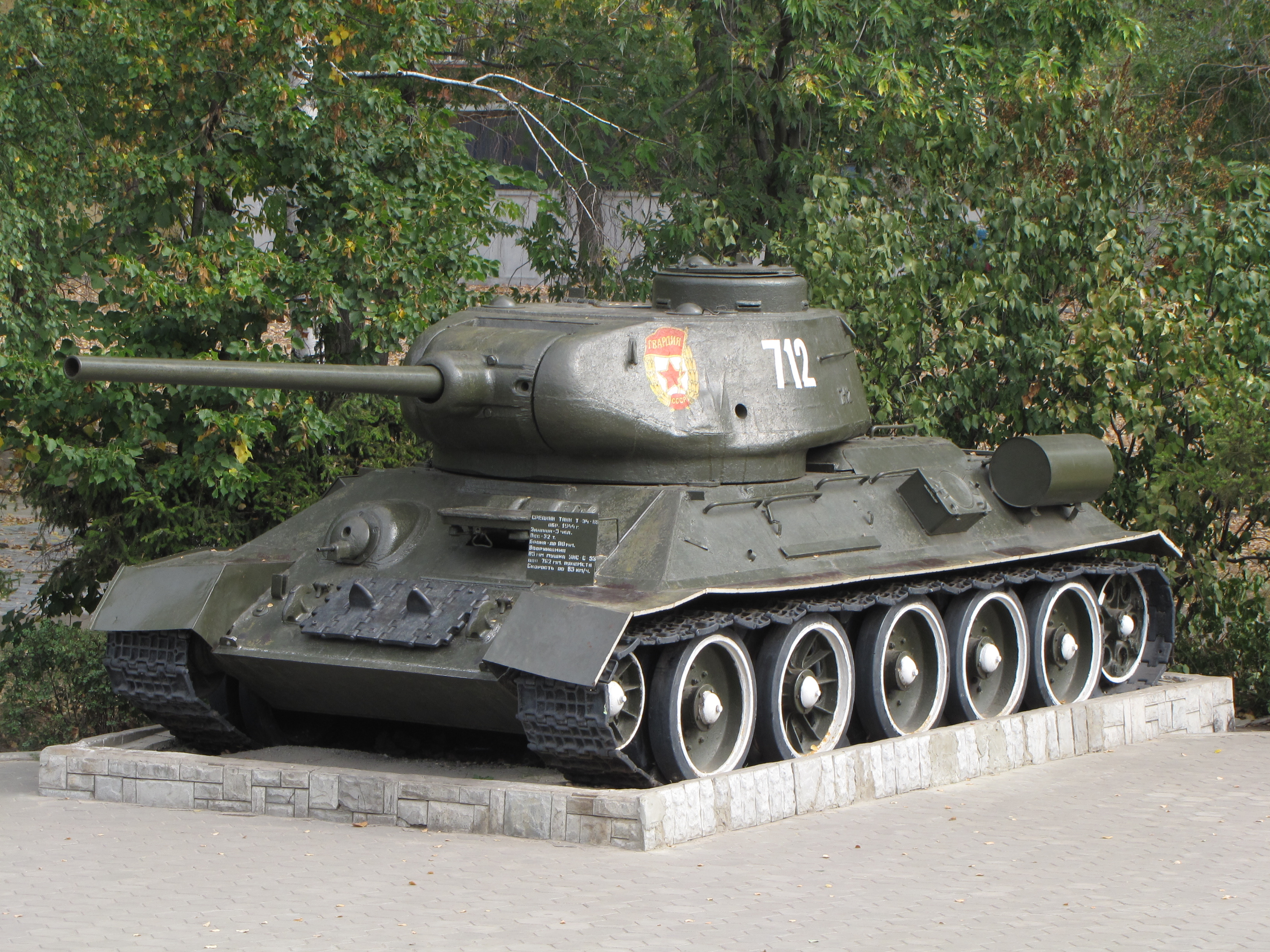
The T-34/85 tank was used by the 9th Tank Corps in the final phase of the war.

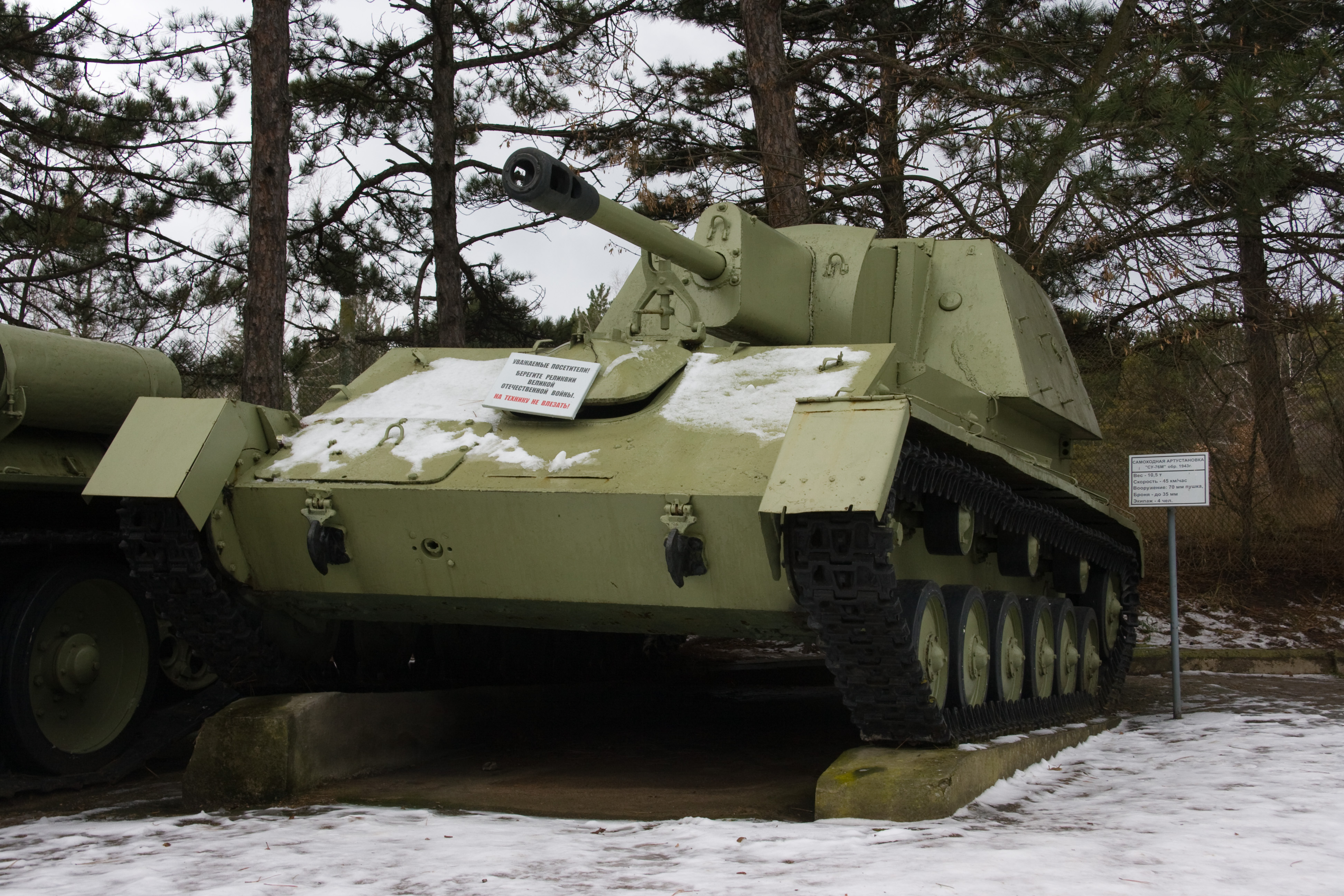
The SU-76 equipped 9th Tank Corps assault gun regiments.

The corps remained in STAVKA Reserves until April 1944 when it returned to action with the following organization:

- 23rd Tank Brigade (T-34/85) (COL S.V. Kuznetsov)
- 95th Tank Brigade (T-34/85) (LTC N.M. Sekunda)
- 108th Tank Brigade (T-34/85) (COL V.N. Baranyuk)
- 8th Motorized Rifle Brigade
- 1455th SU Regiment (SU-76M)
- 1508th SU Regiment (SU-76M)
- 218th Guards Mortar Regiment (36 × 120 mm mortar)
- 216th Antiaircraft Regiment (24 × 37 mm guns)
- 90th Motorcycle Battalion
- 286th Guards Mortar Battalion (8 BM-13)
- 109th Engineer Battalion
- 696th Signal Battalion
- 8th Aviation Signal Company
- U/I Aviation Signal Company
- 76th Chemical Company
- 34th Maintenance Company
- 79th Field Tank Repair Base
- 102nd Field Motor Vehicle Repair Base
- 31st Field Bakery Section
- 925th Field Post
- 1935th Field Office of the State Bank

On 24 June 1944 the corps began to take part in the Belorussian Offensive, stepping on the direction of Bobruisk district Rogachev Zhlobin. On 26 June, the hull broke forward and went to the Bobruisk in the east, went on the east bank of the Berezina river near Titovka, and by the next morning, he grabbed all the roads and crossing the north-east of the city. On 1 July is on the march from the vicinity of Osipovichi (8th Motorized Brigade in the area of settlement Shishchiny, The 95th Tank Brigade near the village of Lev, 23rd Tank Brigade - at the crossing in the village Zhitniy). On 4 July, the corps was included in the Cavalry-Mechanised Group of General Issa Pliyev and launched an attack on Baranavichy, which was taken on 8 July. Then was sent to Minsk, but was redirected to the southwest, participated by the 23rd Tank Brigade in the release of Berezino participated in the liberation of Slonim a, Novogrudok and during the Lublin-Brest Operation, of Brest.

In October 1944 the corps received its final reinforcement of the war with the assignment of the:

- 36th Guards Heavy Tank Regiment (21 IS-II)
- 868th Light Artillery Regiment (24 76 mm guns)

were added to the unit.

=== 1945 ===
On 14 January 1945, the corps attacked as part of the offensive out of the Pulawy bridgehead on the west bank of the Vistula River, south of Warsaw. On 23 January, the corps took part in the capture of Bydgoszcz.

During the East Pomeranian Offensive the corps was subordinated to the 3rd Shock Army and from 1 March 1945 the tank brigades were used to support infantry formations.

During the Battle of Berlin the corps again was subordinated to the 3rd Shock Army as a mobile group and on 16 April 1945 was sent into action at 10:00 AM, advancing on the Seelow Heights, but did not have a significant impact on the offensive. On 18 April, in support of the 79th Rifle Corps, 9th Tank Corps crossed the Frielander waterway, the 23rd and 95th Tank Brigades in cooperation with the 150th Rifle Division captured Kunersdorf, and at the end of April 1945, stormed the Reichstag building.

Garrisons of the 9th Tank Division
in the German Democratic Republic
Cold War 1945 - 1989

=== 1945–1957 9th Tank Division ===
In common with all other Soviet tanks corps, the 9th Tank Corps was reorganised as the 9th Tank Division in mid-late 1945. As part of the occupation forces, the 9th Tank Division was assigned to the ต๋อม (known from 1946 to 1957 as the 1st Guards Mechanized Army).

=== 1957–1965 13th Heavy Tank Division ===
In 1957, it was reorganized and re-designated as the 13th Heavy Tank Division receiving the T10M. It reverted to its original 9th Tank Division designation in 1965.

=== 1965–1991 9th Tank Division ===
The division retained this designation until the Soviet withdrawal from Germany in 1991 when it was moved to Smolensk and disbanded. Its divisional headquarters during the Cold War was based at Riesa.

At the beginning of 1991, the division included two tank and two mechanized infantry regiments (both BMP). It was equipped with T-80 tanks.

- 1st Guards Tank Regiment|1st Guards Tank Chertkovsky double Order of Lenin Red Banner Orders of Suvorov. Kutuzov and Bogdan Khmelnitsky regiment them. Marshal of Armored Forces Mekatvkova (Zeithain): 89 T-80, 60 BMP (33 BMP-2, 23 BMP-1, 4 BRM-1K), 18 2S1 Gvozdika ('Carnation') self-propelled howitzers, 6 BMP-1KSH, 2 PRP-3, 4, 3 RHM, 1 BREM-2, 2 PU-12, 3 MT-55A
- 70th Guards Tank Proskurov-Berlin Red Banner Order of Lenin Order of Kutuzov regiment im.G.I.Kotovskogo (Zeithain): 90 T-80, 60 BMP (32 BMP-2, 24 BMP-1, 4 BRDM-1K), 18 2S1, 6 BMP-1 KSH, 2 PRP-3, 4, N RHM, 1 BREM-2, 2 PU-12, 1 R-145BM, 2 MT-55A
- 302nd Motor Rifle Regiment (Riesa): 30 T-80, 147 BMP (95 BMP-2, 45 BMP-1, 7BMP-1K), 24 armored personnel carriers (10 BTR-70, 14 BTR-60), 18 2S1, 18 2S12, 9 BMP-1KSH, 3 PRP-3, 4, 3 RHM, 2 BREM-2, 2 PU-12, 6 MT-LBT (for 100-mm MT-12 AT guns)
- 1321st Motor Rifle Glukhovskoy-Rechitsa Order of Lenin Red Banner Order of Suvorov Regiment (Jüterbog): 29 T-80, 152 BMP (94 BMP-2, 51 BMP-1, 7 BRDM-1K), 18 2S1, 18 2S-12, 9 BMP-1KSH, 3 PRP-3, 4, 3 RHM, 2 BREM-2, 3 PU-12, 6 MT-LBT (for 100-mm towed MT-12 AT guns)
- 96th Self-Propelled Artillery Regiment (Borna): 54 2S3 "Acacia", 18 BM-21 "Grad"; 5 PRP-3/4, 3 1V-18, 1 1V-19, 2 R-145 BM, 1 R-156 BTR
- 216th Anti-Aircraft Rocket Regiment (Zeithain): in addition to a SAM P-145BM or 1 P-156 armored personnel carrier
- 13th Reconnaissance and Electronic Warfare Battalion (Zeithain): 17 BMP-2, 7 BRM-1K; 1 BMP-1KSH, 2 R-145 BM, 1 R-156 BTR
- 696th Battalion (Riesa): 10 R-145BM, 1 P-156 armored personnel carriers, 2 P-2AM
- 109th Engineer Battalion (Oschatz): 2 IRM, 2 MT-55A
- 112th Chemical Protection Battalion
- 1071st independent battalion for material support
- 68th Repair Battalion
- 200th Medical Battalion

On 19 November 1990 the 9th Tank Division had:

- 238 tanks (T-80)
- 443 BMP (271 BMP-2, 143 BMP-1, 29 BRM-1K)
- 24 APCs (10 BTR-70, 14 BTR-60)
- 126 self-propelled guns (72 2C1, 54 2S3)
- 36 mortars 2S12 "Sani" (120mm)
- 18 MLRS BM-21 "Grad"

=== Honorifics ===
9th Bobruisk-Berlin Red Banner Order of Suvorov Tank Division

== Commanders ==
- Major-General of Tank Troops Alexey Kurkin (12 May 1942 – 18 October 1942)
- Major-General of Tank Troops Alexander Alexandrovich Shamshin (19 October 1942 on 10 March 1943)
- Major-General of Tank Troops, Semyon Bogdanov (11 March 1943 – 24 August 1943) Promoted to Lieutenant-General of Tank Troops 7 June 1943? or 6 July 1943
- Major-General of Tank Troops Gregory S. Rudchenko (25 August 1943 – 1 September 1943) (deceased)
- Major-General of Tank Troops Boris S. Bakharov (from 2 September 1943 – 16 July 1944)
- Major-General of Tank Troops Nikolai Ivanovich Voyeikov (12 July 1944 – 17 July 1944)
- Lieutenant-General of Tank Troops Ivan Kirichenko (12 August 1944 on 9 May 1945)
