= Blinovsky =

Blinovsky Блиновский
- Khutor
- Location within Volgograd Oblast Location within Russia
- Coordinates: 49°17′N 42°17′E
- Country: Russia
- Region: Volgograd Oblast
- District: Serafimovichsky District
- Time zone: UTC+4:00

Blinovsky (Russian: Блиновский) is a rural locality (a khutor) in Proninskoye Rural Settlement, Serafimovichsky District, Volgograd Oblast, Russia. The population was 62 as of 2010. There are 6 streets.

== Geography ==
Blinovsky is located on the Tsutskan River, 60 km southwest of Serafimovich (the district's administrative centre) by road. Peschany is the nearest rural locality.
