= Prelude to the Warsaw Uprising =

The Warsaw Uprising occurred at a stage of the Second World War when it was becoming clear that Nazi Germany was likely to lose. The Uprising ended in capitulation, the deaths of between 150,000 and 200,000 Polish civilians, and only 15% of Warsaw intact; with the benefit of hindsight, many people have argued that it should never have been started. Others have argued that it was inevitable and even crucial for Poland to prove its commitment to the Allied cause. Although Stalin was later to describe it as a "criminal enterprise", just two days prior to its initiation, Radio Moscow had called for the Polish people to rise in arms.

Research in the circumstances that led up to the initiation of the Uprising is difficult because the facts are not always fully available: there are still some sources of information, such as the British and Soviet archives, which remain closed as of 2004. Therefore, analysis of the Uprising must also incorporate the speculation, past and present, concerning the time prior to the uprising.

== Operation Tempest ==
From the very beginning of its existence the Home Army was planning a national uprising against the German forces. Initial plans created by the Polish government-in-exile in 1942 assumed that the allied invasion of Europe would lead to the withdrawal of considerable German forces from the Eastern Front for the defence of the Third Reich. The Home Army would act to prevent troop transfer to the west and to allow the British and American forces to seize Germany by breaking all communication links with the majority of German forces massed in the Soviet Union.

However, by 1943 it became apparent that the allied invasion of Europe would not come in time, and that in all probability the Red Army would reach the pre-war borders of Poland before the invasion had well begun. In February 1943 general Stefan Rowecki amended the plan. The Uprising was to be started in three phases, the first being in the East (with main centres of resistance in Lwów and Wilno), before the advancing Red Army. The second part was to include armed struggle in the belt between the Curzon Line and the Vistula river, while the third part was to be a nationwide uprising in all of Poland.

== Diplomacy with the Soviets and other Allies ==
In the lead-up to the Warsaw Uprising of 1 August 1944, the Polish government-in-exile and the Home Army (Armia Krajowa, AK) faced growing diplomatic isolation due to shifting wartime alliances and the broader context of Soviet-Western relations. Operation Tempest, launched in early 1943 under General Stefan Rowecki, sought to liberate Polish territory ahead of the Red Army’s advance in order to assert national sovereignty. However, the 1943 Katyn massacre and earlier Soviet annexation of eastern Poland had already severed Polish–Soviet relations. At the Tehran Conference in November 1943, the United States and the United Kingdom accepted Stalin’s demand to shift Poland’s eastern border to the Curzon Line, effectively endorsing Soviet influence over postwar Poland.

Despite initial tactical cooperation between AK units and Soviet forces in areas such as Volyn, Wilno, and Lwów, this collaboration quickly deteriorated. In July 1944, the USSR began arresting and deporting AK officers, including General Aleksander Krzyżanowski, and formally sidelined the exiled Polish government by endorsing the pro-Soviet Polish Committee of National Liberation on 22 July 1944. Efforts by General Tadeusz Bór-Komorowski and Prime Minister Stanisław Mikołajczyk to secure Western military aid were largely unsuccessful. Mikołajczyk’s June 1944 visit to Washington and subsequent diplomatic appeals yielded few results as the Allies prioritized the Western Front following the D-Day landings.

As Soviet forces reached the eastern outskirts of Warsaw on 30 July, Stalin refused to provide effective support for the uprising, delaying Allied air operations and dismissing the AK’s leadership as "adventurers". While British and South African aircrews conducted risky airdrops in mid-August, broader assistance, including the deployment of Polish paratroopers, was withheld, partly due to prior Allied agreements with the USSR. The lack of Soviet intervention and limited Western aid contributed to the uprising’s failure, culminating in massive civilian casualties and the near-total destruction of Warsaw by 2 October 1944.

== The Soviet advance ==
The plan was intended both as a political manifestation of the influence of Polish Government in Exile and as a direct operation against German occupiers. The fear was that in the aftermath of the war the allies would ignore the legal London-based government. It was clear that Poland would be liberated by the Red Army, and that the Soviet Union did not recognise the Government-in-Exile.

Initially, after the Red Army forces crossed the pre-war Polish borders, the local Home Army units were engaged in successful cooperation with the Soviets in liberating several towns and cities. However, in most cases after the struggle ended the Polish officers and members of local administration were caught by the NKVD and either shot or sent to Gulags and prisons in Russia. At the same time most of the Polish soldiers caught by the Soviets were given the choice of either joining the Soviet-backed Polish People's Army or sharing the fate of their officers.

Nevertheless, the Soviet advance was fast, and the Polish authorities saw no other choice but to continue the struggle against the German forces and aid the Soviets. At the same time the government in London asked the SOE and the Foreign Office several times for an allied mission to Poland to be sent; such missions had already been dispatched to all resistance movements in Europe, including Albania, Czechoslovakia, France, Greece, Italy, Norway, Yugoslavia. However, the pleas were not fulfilled until December 1944.

The official line of Soviet propaganda was that the Polish underground was "waiting with their arms at ease" and was not fighting the common enemy. As the Soviet forces were nearing Warsaw in June and July 1944, the Soviet radio stations demanded a full national uprising in Warsaw to cut the communication lines of the German units still on the right bank of the Vistula. On July 29, 1944, the first Soviet armoured units reached the outskirts of Warsaw.

With the recent flood of reports from the eastern territories about forced demilitarisation, trials and execution of Home Army soldiers by the Soviets, on 21 July 1944 the High Command of the Home Army decided to expand the scope of the Operation Tempest to include Warsaw itself. The date for the Warsaw Uprising was set to 1 August. The uprising began at the end of the Soviet offensive Operation Bagration.

== German defensive preparations ==
By the end of July the town had been declared "Festung Warschau" (Fortress Warsaw) by the Germans. It was to be defended at all cost against the Soviet offensive. However, the July 20 Plot and the failed attempt to assassinate Adolf Hitler made many German units withdraw westward through Warsaw. The Home Army saw it as a sign of defeat of the Germans. The number of German soldiers in the area was lowered significantly.

On July 27, governor of the General Government Hans Frank called for 100,000 Polish men between the ages of 17–65 to arrive at several assembly points in Warsaw the following day. They were to be employed at construction of fortifications for the Wehrmacht in and around the city. This move was viewed by the Home Army as an attempt to neutralise the underground forces and the underground urged Warsaw inhabitants to ignore it. Fearing German reprisal actions, general Tadeusz Bór-Komorowski ordered full mobilisation of Home Army forces in Warsaw area.

== See also ==
- Warsaw Uprising
- Battle of Radzymin (1944)
