= Lublin–Brest offensive =

Soviet Union

Lublin–Brest Offensive
- Part of Operation Bagration and the Eastern Front of WWII
Date	18 July – 2 August 1944 (primary operation); 30 September 1944 (secondary operation)
Location	Eastern Poland and Western Belarus
Result	Soviet victory

Belligerents
Germany	Soviet Union; Poland

Commanders and leaders
(Nazi Germany) Josef Harpe (Nazi Germany) Georg Hans Reinhardt	(Soviet Union) Konstantin Rokossovsky (Poland) Zygmunt Berling

Units involved
Army Group North Ukraine; Army Group Centre	1st Belorussian Front; 1st Tadeusz Kościuszko Infantry Division

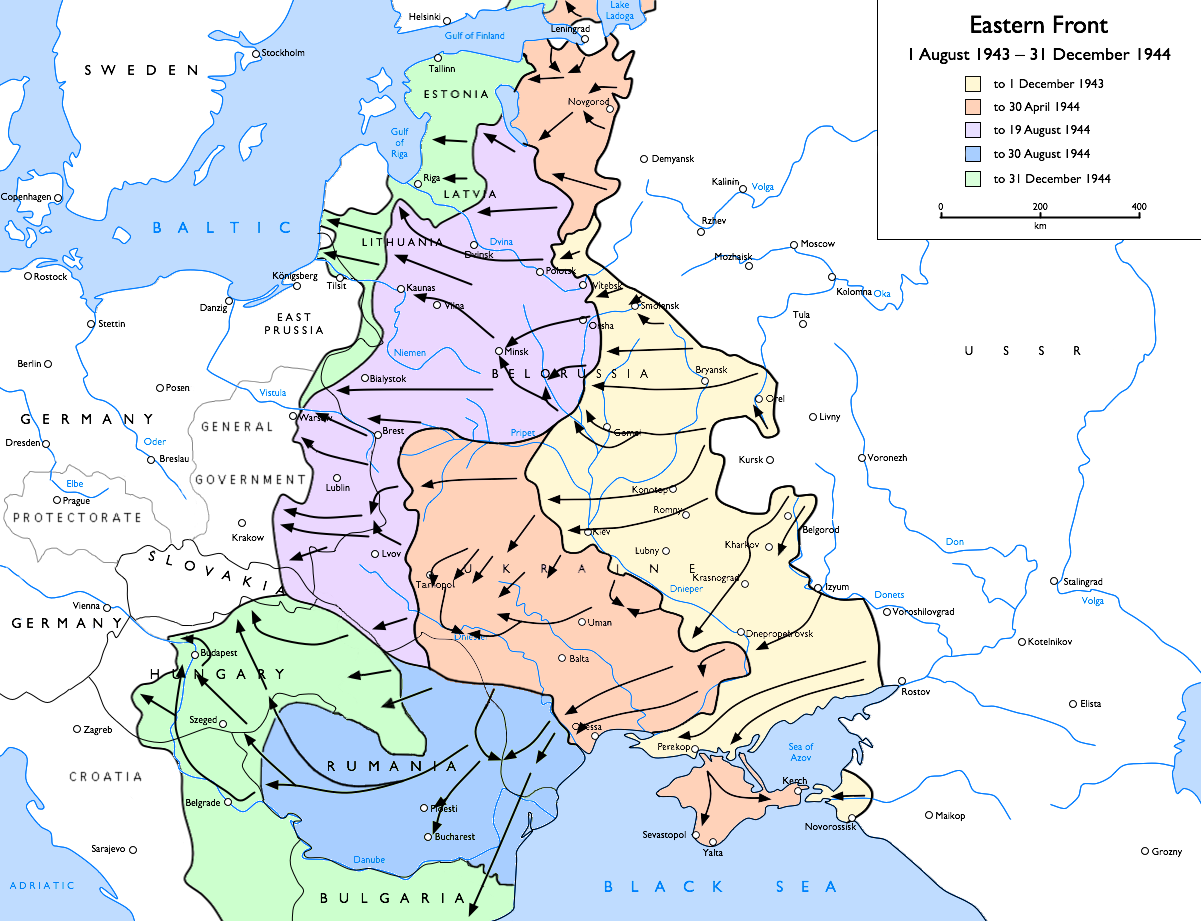
The Lublin‐Brest Offensive is covered in the middle of the purple area – note the cities of Brest, Lublin and Warsaw

The Lublin–Brest Offensive (Russian: Люблин‐Брестская наступательная операция, romanized: Lyublin-Brestskaya nastupatel'naya operatsiya, 18 July – 2 August 1944) was a part of the Operation Bagration strategic offensive by the Soviet Red Army to clear the Nazi German forces from the regions of Eastern Poland and Western Belarus. The offensive was executed by the left (southern) wing of the 1st Belorussian Front and took place during July 1944; it was opposed by the German Army Group North Ukraine and Army Group Centre.

The operation was accompanied by several other offensives, particularly the Lvov–Sandomierz Offensive of the 1st Ukrainian Front in the south; both offensives launched weeks after the start of the successful Operation Bagration to the north which cleared German forces from most of Belarus.

After reaching its target objectives, the offensive momentum carried on as the Soviet forces advanced on Warsaw during August (2 August – 30 September 1944); however Soviet forces did not aid the Polish Warsaw Uprising, which is a matter of some controversy.

== Opposing forces ==
On 15 June, Army Group North Ukraine under command of Josef Harpe was composed of the 4th Panzer Army, 1st Panzer Army, and the First Army (Hungary). Army Group Centre had the 2nd Army, 4th Army, 9th Army and 3rd Panzer Army.

The Soviet 1st Belorussian Front under command of Konstantin Rokossovsky included the 8th Guards, 28th, 47th, 61st, 65th, 69th, and 70th (Combined Arms) Armies, 2nd Tank Army, 6th and 16th Air Armies, 11th Tank Corps, 1st Polish Army, 2nd Guards and 7th Guards Cavalry Corps.

== The offensive: securing Lublin and Brest ==
The Lublin-Brest region was first used as a feint, on 9–10 July drawing German attention away from Soviet offensive preparations at Lvov-Sandomierz Offensive. After the success of that offensive, clearly visible in the first days (from 13 July), Konstantin Rokossovsky started a serious push westwards in the Lublin-Brest area as well.

On 18 July five armies of the 1st Belorussian Front (including one Polish army, the Polish First Army) deployed on the front's left wing south of the Pinsk Marshes, struck and shattered the defenses of Army Group North Ukraine 4th Panzer Army west of Kovel. Within hours, the front's 2nd Tank Army and several mobile corps began exploiting success to the west with the infantry following in their wake.

Lieutenant General Nikolai Gusev's 47th Army and Colonel General Vasily Chuikov's 8th Guards Army broke through the German defenses, and by 21 July they had reached the eastern banks of the Bug River. The following day, Lieutenant General Semyon Bogdanov's 2nd Tank Army began to advance toward Lublin and the Vistula river, while 11th Tank and 2nd Guards Cavalry Corps spearheaded a northwest push toward Siedlce, with the aim of preventing the retreat of Army Group Center forces which were fighting around the cities of Brest and Bialystok. Nazi concentration camp Maidanek near Lublin was liberated on 22 July. General Bogdanov was wounded on 23 July during the fighting for Lublin; the 2nd Tank Army was taken over by Major General A. I. Radzievsky. Despite the change of command, the Soviet rapid advance continued, as the lead elements of 8th Guards Army and 2nd Tank Army reached the eastern banks of Vistula on 25 July. A day earlier, on 24 July, Konstantin Rokossovsky’s forces took Lublin and advanced westward towards Vistula, south of the Polish capital of Warsaw. The Soviet High Command (Stavka) ordered Radzievsky to advance north toward Warsaw as part of the maneuver designed to prevent the retreat of Army Group Centre.

On 28 July Brest was taken. By 2 August, the 1st Belorussian Front's left wing armies seized bridgeheads over the Vistula at Magnuszew (Chuikov's 8th Guards Army) and Puławy (Lieutenant General V. la. Kolpakchi's 69th Army). Germans launched several counterattacks on those vital bridgeheads. Army Group Centre's XLVI Panzer Corps conducted counter-attacks from August 8 to reduce the bridgehead. The 19th and Hermann Göring Panzer Divisions mounted several assaults during early August, but the Soviet lines remained firm, managing to retain their positions on the other shore; they would prove crucial during the upcoming Vistula-Oder Offensive that would cross central and western Poland and aim to bring the Soviets within the reach of Berlin.

Further battles of that period included the battle of Studzianki.

== The controversy: bridgeheads instead of Warsaw ==
During the offensive bringing the 1st Belorussian Front's left wing closer to the Vistula River, the Polish Home Army (Armia Krajowa) staged an insurrection in Warsaw; the Soviet advance was one of the factors which accelerated the Uprising, as the Poles both counted on Soviet support and wanted to secure their capital independently (as part of the Operation Tempest).

Only days before the uprising began in Warsaw (on 1 August), the Stavka (Soviet General Headquarters) commanded Rokossovsky to dispatch his 2nd Tank Army in the direction of Warsaw's eastern suburbs (Praga). By 28 July, Radzievsky's army, with three corps alongside, engaged the 73rd Infantry Division and the Hermann Goering Panzer Division 40 kilometres southeast of Warsaw. Radzievsky wanted to secure the routes into Warsaw from the east, while the Germans aimed to prevent that and hold on to Warsaw. The 2nd Tank Army was to be protected on the right flank by a cavalry corps (the 2nd Guards) and the 47th Army, however it reached the region east of Warsaw on 29 July, before the slower 47th Army could provide support; the 47th Army and the 2nd Guards were engaged in the battle around Siedlce, 50 kilometres to the east. Germans counterattacked, in what became known as the Battle of Radzymin, with two panzer corps (XXXIX and IV SS). On 29 July, Radzievsky ordered his 8th Guards Tank Corps (under Lieutenant General A. F. Popov) and 3rd Tank Corps (under Major General N. D. Vedeneev) to advance northward (northeast of Warsaw) aiming to turn the German defenders' left flank, as the 16th Tank Corps engaged the Germans southeast of Warsaw. 8th Guards Tank Corps was able to fight its way 20 kilometres east of the city, the 3rd Tank Corps however was stopped by a series of successive counterattacks by German armored units under Walter Model.

From 30 July, the Hermann Goering and 19th Panzer Divisions struck the overextended tank corps near Radzymin, north of Wołomin, 15 kilometres northeast of Warsaw. On 2 and 3 August, the 4th Panzer Division and 5th SS Panzergrenadier Division Wiking joined the German counteroffensive. As a result, the 3rd Tank Corps sustained heavy casualties, and the 8th Guards Tank Corps was also weakened. From 30 July through 5 August Germans succeeded in not only stopping the Soviet's advance but in pushing them back, inflicting heavy losses on the frontline Soviet units. By 5 August when the Soviet 47th Army's was able to enter the frontline struggle, the 2nd Tank Army had to be withdrawn. The three rifle corps of 47th Army had to hold the 80-kilometers frontline, stretching from south of Warsaw north to Siedlce. Without armor support, the 47th Army could not resume the offensive. German forces in the area were still holding and their link with the Army Group Centre in the east had been damaged but not cut.

Until 20 August, the 47th Army remained the only major Red Army unit in the vicinity of Warsaw. The Soviets made no attempt to aid the uprising, concentrating on securing Soviet positions east of the river, not providing the insurgents even with artillery support. At the time, the bulk of the 1st Belorussian Front's centre and right wing were struggling to overcome German defences north of Siedlce on the approaches to the Narew River and, according to Soviet accounts, were unable to support any action to aid Warsaw directly. Western and contemporary Polish accounts claim that Joseph Stalin deliberately withheld support for the Polish Home Army as he wanted the Home Army – supporting the Polish government in exile, a competition to the pro‐Soviet Polish Committee of National Liberation – to be destroyed.

On 20 August the 1st Polish Army of General Zygmunt Berling joined the Soviet 47th Army. Red Army forces north of Warsaw finally advanced across the Bug River on 3 September, reached the Narew River the following day, and secured bridgeheads across that river on 6 September. Lead elements of two Polish divisions from the 1st Army attempted to cross the Vistula into Warsaw on 13 September but made little progress and having sustained heavy casualties were evacuated back across the river ten days later. The Uprising forces capitulated on 2 October; the Soviets would take Warsaw without a major battle during their advance early in 1945. American military historian David M. Glantz notes that while the Soviets could have taken Warsaw and aided the insurgents, from a purely military standpoint this would have required diverting efforts from attempts to secure bridgeheads south and north of Warsaw, involved the Soviets in costly city fighting and gained them less optimal positions for further offensives; this, coupled with political factors meant that the Soviet decision not to aid the Warsaw Uprising was based not only on political, but also on military considerations.

== Aftermath: battle for the Narew bridgeheads ==
The bridgeheads at Serock, the confluence of the Bug and Narew Rivers, had been established by the Soviet 65th Army at the end of the Lublin–Brest Offensive. The German XX Corps of Second Army was deployed in defence.

On 3 October elements of the 3rd and 25th Panzer Divisions, supported by the 252nd Infantry Division, were thrown into an attack to eliminate the 65th Army's positions in the bridgehead. On the southern face, German units reached the bank of the Narew by 5 October. The memoirs of General Pavel Batov, 65th Army's commander, describe committing the 44th Guards Rifle Division in an attempt to halt the German advance.

An attack on the northern part of the bridgehead was planned for 8 October, involving the 19th Panzer and Wiking divisions but the gains made were eliminated by a Soviet counter-attack on 14 October.
