= Korotovsky =

Korotovsky Коротовский
- Khutor
- Location within Volgograd Oblast Location within Russia
- Coordinates: 49°19′N 42°33′E
- Country: Russia
- Region: Volgograd Oblast
- District: Serafimovichsky District
- Time zone: UTC+4:00

Korotovsky (Russian: Коротовский) is a rural locality (a khutor) in Srednetsaritsynskoye Rural Settlement, Serafimovichsky District, Volgograd Oblast, Russia. The population was 186 as of 2010. There are five streets.

== Geography ==
Korotovsky is located 37 km southwest of Serafimovich (the district's administrative centre) by road. Srednetsaritsynsky is the nearest rural locality.
