= Semyon Bogdanov =

Soviet Marshal (1894–1960)

- Семён Ильич Богданов
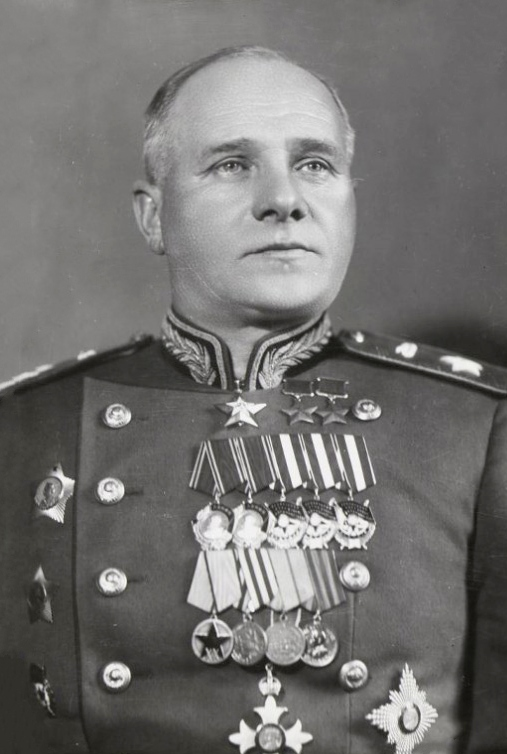
- Born: 10 September [O.S. 29 August] 1894; Saint Petersburg, Russian Empire
- Died: 12 March 1960 (aged 65); Moscow, Soviet Union
- Military career
- Allegiance: Russian Empire; Russian SFSR; Soviet Union
- Branch: Imperial Russian Army; Red Army (Soviet Army from 1946)
- Service years: 1915–1918; 1918–1938; 1939–1956
- Rank: Marshal of tank forces
- Commands: 12th Tank Corps; 6th Mechanized Corps (became 5th Guards Mechanized Corps); 9th Tank Corps; 2nd Tank Army (became 2nd Guards Tank Army); Armored and Mechanized Forces of the Soviet Army; 7th Mechanized Army; Military Academy of the Armored Forces
- Conflicts: World War I Russian Civil War; Polish–Soviet War; World War II
- Awards: Hero of the Soviet Union (twice)

Semyon Ilyich Bogdanov (Russian: Семён Ильи́ч Богда́нов; 10 September [O.S. 29 August] 1894 – 12 March 1960) was a Soviet Marshal of tank forces, and twice Hero of the Soviet Union.

Following the German invasion of the Soviet Union, he was deputy commander of the 5th Army (1941–1942), commander of the 6th Mechanized Corps (1942–1943), and later commander of the 2nd Tank Army, which transformed into the 2nd Guards Tank Army in November 1944.

Units under Semyon Bogdanov's command took part in the Battle of Moscow, in the Korsun-Shevchenkovsky, Uman-Botoshany, Belarusian, Vistula-Oder, East Pomeranian and Berlin operations. His 2nd Guards Tank Army was the first Soviet Army to enter Berlin during combat operations.

== Early life, World War I, and Russian Civil War ==
Bogdanov was born to a peasant family on 10 September 1894 in Nikolo-Khlavitsky volost of Kholmsky Uyezd, Pskov Governorate. He worked at the Putilov Factory in Petrograd and as a mechanic at the Vickers Factory in Reval. During World War I Bogdanov was mobilized into the Imperial Russian Army on 13 January 1915 and volunteered to be sent to the reserve aeronautical battalion of the 1st Aviation Park of the Northern Front, and in 1916 completed driving courses at the park. In the same year he was sent the study at the Northern Front School of Ensigns (praporshchiks) in Gatchina and upon graduation in May 1917 Bogdanov was appointed a platoon commander in the 2nd Reserve Infantry Regiment at Fredrikshamn in Finland. As a platoon commander of a Russian and Finnish detachment, selected from the regiment, he fought in the suppression of a White uprising at Kuopio. After being demobilized in February 1918, Bogdanov became commander of a platoon guarding the Nikolayevskaya Railroad.

During the Russian Civil War, Bogdanov joined the Red Army at Petrograd in June 1918. He was appointed a platoon commander in the 4th Kostroma Regiment, and from April 1919 commanded a company of the 2nd Reserve Regiment. From January 1920 he served as a company and battalion commander of the 502nd Rifle Regiment of the 56th Rifle Division, fighting in the Polish–Soviet War in battles in Vitebsk, Minsk, and Vilna Governorates. For his "exceptional courage in battle," Bogdanov was awarded the Order of the Red Banner. He returned to the 2nd Reserve Regiment to command a platoon in October 1920 and in January 1921 transferred to command a company at the 40th Kostroma Infantry Courses for Command Personnel. Between 10 May and 20 July, he participated in the suppression of the Tambov Rebellion as a company and battalion commander and acting chief of the course.

== Interwar period ==
After graduating in October 1923 from the one-year Higher Military-Pedagogical School in Moscow, Bogdanov became a company commander at the 14th Poltava Infantry School for Command Personnel. Transferred to the 135th Rifle Regiment of the 45th Rifle Division of the Ukrainian Military District in September 1925, Bogdanov served as a battalion commander, assistant regimental commander for supply units, and assistant regimental commander for personnel. Upon completion of the Vystrel course in October 1930, he was appointed commander of the 134th Regiment of the division, which was converted into the 134th Mechanized Brigade in May 1934 when the division became the 45th Mechanized Corps.

Transferred to the Military Academy of Mechanization and Motorization in October 1935 to serve as commander of the school training mechanized regiment, Bogdanov graduated from Courses of Improvement for Commanding Personnel at the school in 1936, and in January 1937 became commander of the 9th Mechanized Brigade. He was under investigation between 1 May 1938 and 27 October 1939, sentenced to two years of imprisonment for "negligence." However, Bogdanov was quickly released under an amnesty and reinstated into the Red Army. After being at the disposal of the Personnel Directorate, he was appointed chief of the infantry of the 29th Motorized Division in March 1940. Bogdanov became commander of the 32nd Separate Light Tank Brigade in November 1940, and continued in command of 30th Tank Division of the 14th Mechanized Corps, stationed in Belarus with the Western Special Military District, formed from the brigade in March 1941.

== World War II ==
After Operation Barbarossa began on 22 June, Bogdanov led the division as part of the 4th Army of the Western Front in fighting against the German 2nd Panzer Group in the Brest sector, attempting to limit the German advance to the line of the Berezina River. During the Battle of Moscow, he commanded the Mozhaysk Fortified Region of the Mozhaysk Defense Line from October 1941, then was deputy commander of the 5th Army for tank forces, and between March and May 1942 served in the latter position with the 10th Army. In May, he was appointed commander of the 12th Tank Corps, forming in the Moscow Military District. After the completion of its formation, the corps became part of the 3rd Tank Army of the Western Front. In November, Bogdanov became commander of the 6th Mechanized Corps, which as part of the 2nd Guards Army fought in the Kotelnikovo Offensive. For its actions, the corps was converted into the 5th Guards Mechanized Corps in January 1943 and awarded the Zimovniki honorific. Bogdanov transferred to command the 9th Tank Corps in March 1943. As part of the 13th Army of the Central Front, the corps fought in the Battle of Kursk.

From September, Bogdanov commanded the 2nd Tank Army, which became the 2nd Guards Tank Army on 20 November 1944. In January 1944, the army fought in the repulse of the German counterattack towards Vinnytsia as part of the 1st Ukrainian Front, then in the Korsun–Shevchenkovsky Offensive, the Uman–Botoșani Offensive, the Lublin–Brest Offensive, the Vistula–Oder Offensive, the East Pomeranian Offensive, and the Berlin Offensive. In the Uman–Botoșani Offensive, the army and the 27th Army formed the mobile group of the front and broke through Axis defenses north Uman. Together with the 29th Tank Corps of the 5th Guards Tank Army and the 73rd Rifle Corps of the 52nd Army they captured Uman. Despite difficulties caused by the spring thaw, the army pursued the Axis forces and advanced 240 km, crossing the Southern Bug, Dniester, and Prut and reaching the approaches to Jassy by the end of the operation. For his leadership of the army, Bogdanov was awarded the title Hero of the Soviet Union on 11 March 1944. He received the title a second time on 4 June 1945 for his command of the army in the Vistula–Oder Offensive, the crossing of the Neisse and Oder, and advance to the Baltic coast. On 1 June 1945 he was promoted to Marshal of Tank Forces.

== Postwar ==
After the end of the war, Bogdanov continued in command of the 2nd Guards Tank Army, and in May 1947 became commander of the Armored and Mechanized Forces of the Group of Soviet Forces in Germany. In August 1948, he became first deputy commander of the Armored and Mechanized Forces of the Soviet Army, rising to command the latter in November. On 28 April 1953 he became commander of the 7th Mechanized Army of the Belorussian Military District, then in May 1954 chief of the Military Academy of the Armored Forces. On 21 May 1956 Bogdanov retired for health reasons, dying in Moscow on 12 March 1960.

== Awards and honors ==
Bogdanov was a recipient of the following awards and decorations:

Soviet Union

Hero of the Soviet Union, twice (11 March 1944, 6 April 1945)
Order of Lenin, twice (11 March 1944, 6 April 1945)
Order of the Red Banner, four times (30 November 1920, 27 August 1943, 3 November 1944, 1 June 1949)
Order of Suvorov, 1st class (23 August 1944)
Order of Suvorov, 2nd class (7 February 1943)
Medal "For the Defence of Stalingrad" (22 December 1942)
Medal "For the Defence of Moscow" (1 May 1944)
Medal "For the Liberation of Warsaw" (9 June 1945)
Medal "For the Capture of Berlin" (9 June 1945)
Medal "For the Victory over Germany in the Great Patriotic War 1941–1945" (9 May 1945)
Jubilee Medal "XX Years of the Workers' and Peasants' Red Army" (22 February 1938)
Jubilee Medal "30 Years of the Soviet Army and Navy" (22 February 1948)
Jubilee Medal "40 Years of the Armed Forces of the USSR" (18 December 1957)
Medal "In Commemoration of the 800th Anniversary of Moscow" (1947)

Foreign Awards

Knight's Cross of the Virtuti Militari (Poland)
Cross of Grunwald, 2nd class (Poland)
Medal "For Warsaw 1939-1945" (Poland)
Medal "For Oder, Neisse and the Baltic" (Poland)
Honorary Knight Grand Cross of the Order of the British Empire (United Kingdom)
