= 2nd Guards Tank Army =

Russian Ground Forces formation

2nd Tank Army (1943–1944) 2nd Guards Tank Army (1944–1993) 2nd Guards Red Banner Army (1993–1998)
- 2-я гвардейская танковая армия
- Active: 1943–1998
- Country: Soviet Union (to 1991); Russia (1991–1998)
- Branch: Armoured Forces
- Type: Field army
- Role: Breakthrough and Exploitation in Deep Operations
- Size: 500–800 main battle tanks
- Part of: Central Military District
- Engagements: World War II; East Pomeranian Offensive; Battle of Berlin

Commanders
- Notable commanders: Semyon Bogdanov; Alexei Ivanovich Radzievsky

Insignia
NATO Map Symbol
2 гв
ТА

The 2nd Guards Tank Army (Russian: 2-я гвардейская танковая армия, romanized: 2-ya gvardeyskaya tankovaya armiya) was a large military formation of the Red Army and Soviet Army, later part of the Russian Ground Forces of the Russian Federation.

The army was originally formed in early 1943 as the 2nd Tank Army. It was the first Red Army unit to enter Berlin during the Battle of Berlin.

== World War II ==
=== Formation ===
The 2nd Tank Army was formed during January and February of 1943 from the 3rd Reserve Army of the Bryansk Front under the command of Prokofy Romanenko.

On February 1, 1943, the Army's order of battle was as follows:

2nd Tank Army

- 16th Tank Corps (Major General of Technical Forces A. G. Maslov)
  - 107th Tank Brigade
  - 109th Tank Brigade
  - 164th Tank Brigade
  - 15th Motor Rifle Brigade
- 6th Guards Rifle Division
- 16th Rifle Division
- 37th Guards Mortar Regiment*
- 51st Motorcycle Battalion
- 357th Engineer Battalion

In the middle of February the army joined the Soviet Central Front and as part of Central Front in February – March took part in offensive operations in the direction of Bryansk, which ultimately failed.

=== Summer of 1943 ===
By July 1st, 1943, the 2nd Tank Army had been reorganized as a fully mechanized formation, with the following order of battle:

2nd Tank Army

- 3rd Tank Corps (Major General of Tank Forces Maxim Sinenko)
  - 50th Tank Brigade
  - 51st Tank Brigade
  - 103rd Tank Brigade
  - 57th Motor Rifle Brigade
  - 74th Motorcycle Battalion
  - 881st Tank Destroyer Regiment
  - 728th Tank Destroyer Battalion
  - 234th Mortar Regiment
  - 121st Anti-Aircraft Artillery Regiment
- 16th Tank Corps (Major General of Tank Forces V. E. Grigor'ev)
  - 107th Tank Brigade
  - 109th Tank Brigade
  - 164th Tank Brigade
  - 15th Motor Rifle Brigade
  - 51st Motorcycle Battalion
  - 1441st Self Propelled Artillery Regiment
  - 614th Tank Destroyer Regiment
  - 729th Tank Destroyer Battalion
  - 226th Mortar Regiment
- 11th Guards Tank Brigade
- 87th Motorcycle Battalion
- 357th Engineer Battalion

In July – August – 2nd Tank Army took part in the Orel strategic offensive operation – Operation Kutuzov – within the Kromy’-Orel offensive operation and the Chernigov-Pripyat offensive operation (26.08–30.09.1943) under the command of Alexey Rodin.

=== The Soviet Offensives, 1943-1945 ===
In the beginning of September 1943 Rodin was replaced by Semyon Bogdanov as commander, and the 2nd Tank Army was redeployed to the Stavka VGK reserve. In the middle of January 1944, it joined the 1st Ukrainian Front and remained in its structure until the end of January when it participated in the repulse of German counter-strokes in the direction of Vinnitsa; in February the army fought in the south-west of the Korsun-Shevchenkovsky operation.

As part of the 2nd Ukrainian Front, and from the middle of June 1944 within the 1st Belorussian Front, the Army participated in the Uman-Botoşani offensive, Lublin – Brest, and the Warsaw-Poznan offensive. For its service in the above operations the Army was granted the title of the Second Guards 'Red Banner' Tank Army in November 1944 and almost all of its formations and units received combat awards, with the majority of sub-units awarded honorifics commemorating operations they distinguished themselves in. After participating in the East Pomeranian Offensive and the Seelow-Berlin offensive operation, it was the first Soviet Army to enter Berlin during the Battle for Berlin.

During the war, over 103,000 soldiers of the army were awarded awards and medals, 221 of them being awarded the decoration of the Hero of the Soviet Union, while the army commander Semyon Bogdanov was awarded the Hero of the Soviet Union twice.

== Cold War ==
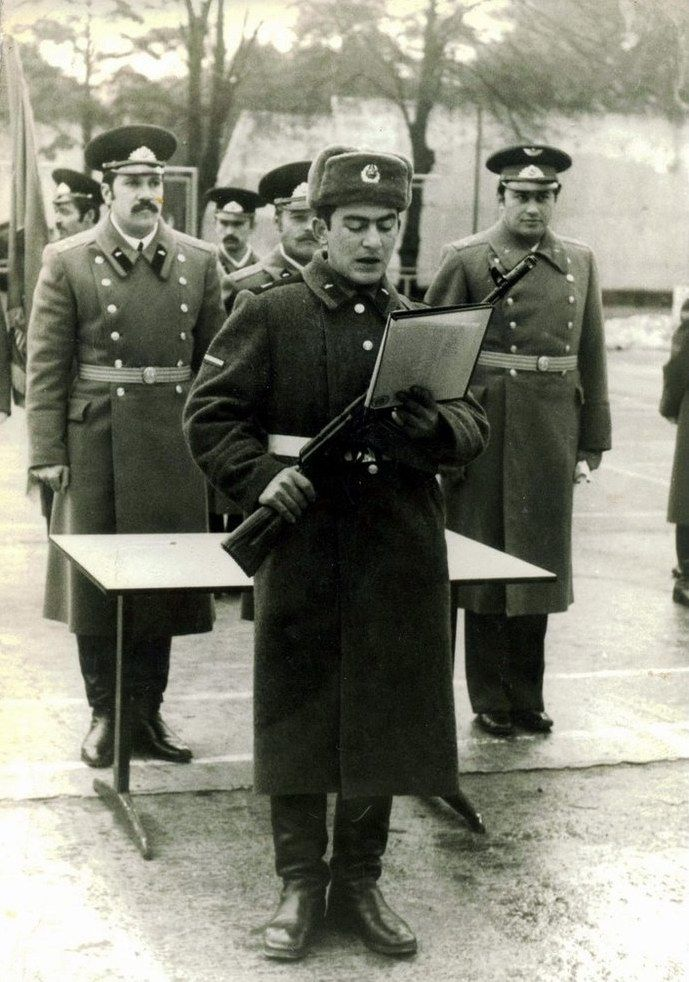
Soldier of the 21st Motor Rifle Division at Perleberg, East Germany, in the 1980s

After the war ended the Army, now named Second Guards 'Red Banner' Tank Army, was located with the Group of Soviet Forces in Germany with the staff in Fuerstenberg. However the only wartime formation that continued to serve with the Army was the 16th Guards Tank Division (the former 9th Guards Tank Corps). Although up to the 1970s it had retained of its wartime units – 12th Guards Tank Division (the former 12th Tank Corps) and 35th Motor Rifle Division (former 1st Mechanised Corps), without considering those formations that joined the Army as early as 1946. The three last wartime divisions were replaced at the end of the 1970s – the 94th Guards, 21st (stationed at Perleburg) and 207th Motor Rifle Divisions. It also included the 5th Separate Tank Brigade.

The 1185th independent Landing-Assault Battalion was formed within the Army in 1981, withdrawn to Estonia in 1989, and disbanded in 1991.

== Post-Cold War service ==
The Army was withdrawn to Samara in the Volga Military District in 1993 and changed its name into 2nd Guards Red Banner Army matching its nature of combined-arms army that same year. It holds the Fighting Banner of the 2nd Guards Tank Army in storage. It was allocated the 16th and 90th Guards Tank Divisions for some years before being disbanded in 1998. 16th Guards Tank Division was reduced to a Guards weapons and equipment storage base in December 1997.

The Army was reformed in 2001 as the 2nd Guards Combined Arms Army from the former Volga MD headquarters and formerly consisted of the 27th Guards Motor Rifle Division and the 201st Motor Rifle Division.

A former commander of the 2nd Guards Tank Army, Army General Nikolai Makarov, became Chief of Material of the Armed Forces, Deputy Minister of Defence of the Russian Federation, and is now Chief of General Staff.

The 385th Guards Artillery Brigade was established in August 1981 from the previous 98th Guards Cannon Artillery Regiment. It returned from Planken in East Germany to Totskoye in 1993.

== Structure ==
=== 1990 ===
- 16th Guards Tank Division (Neustrelitz)
- 21st Motor Rifle Division (Perleberg)
- 94th Guards Motor Rifle Division (Schwerin)
- 207th Motor Rifle Division (Stendal)
- 112th Guards Rocket Brigade (Gentzrode) (12 9K72 Elbrus)
- 458th Rocket Brigade (Neustrelitz)
- 61st Anti-Aircraft Rocket Brigade (Staats)
- 290th Artillery Brigade (Schweinrich)
- 118th Logistic Support Brigade (Ravensbrück)
- 172nd Helicopter Regiment (Parchim)
- 439th Helicopter Regiment (Parchim)
- 9th Helicopter Squadron (Neuruppin)
- 480th Engineer Sapper Brigade
- 69th Pontoon-Bridge Regiment (Rathenow)
- 15th Transporting-Landing Battalion
- 5th Signal Regiment (Ravensbrück)
- 52nd NBC Protection Battalion (12 K-611) (Rathenow)
- 250th Radio-Technical Regiment (Stendal)
- 52nd Radio-Technical Battalion (Ravensbrück)
- 836nd Radio Relay Cable Battalion
- 908th Electronic Warfare Battalion
- 297th Repair Recovery Battalion
- 310th Repair Recovery Battalion
- 240th Security and Support Battalion (Fürstenberg/Havel)

== Commanders ==
- Lieutenant General Prokofy Romanenko (January – February 1943)
- Lieutenant General Alexei Rodin (February – September 1943)
- Colonel General Semen Bogdanov (September 1943 – July 1944 and January 1945 – 1947)
- Lieutenant General Alexei Radzievsky (July 1944 – January 1945)

== See also ==
- List of Soviet military sites in Germany

== Sources and references ==
=== Bibliography ===
- Galeotti, Mark (2017). The Modern Russian Army 1992–2016. Elite 217. Oxford: Osprey. ISBN 978-1-47281-908-6.
- http://samsv.narod.ru/
- Glantz, David M. (2005). Companion to Colossus Reborn: Key Documents and Statistics. Lawrence: Kansas University Press. ISBN 0-7006-1359-5.
