= Operation Winter Storm =

1942 WWII German offensive near Stalingrad

- Part of the Battle of Stalingrad during the Eastern Front of World War II
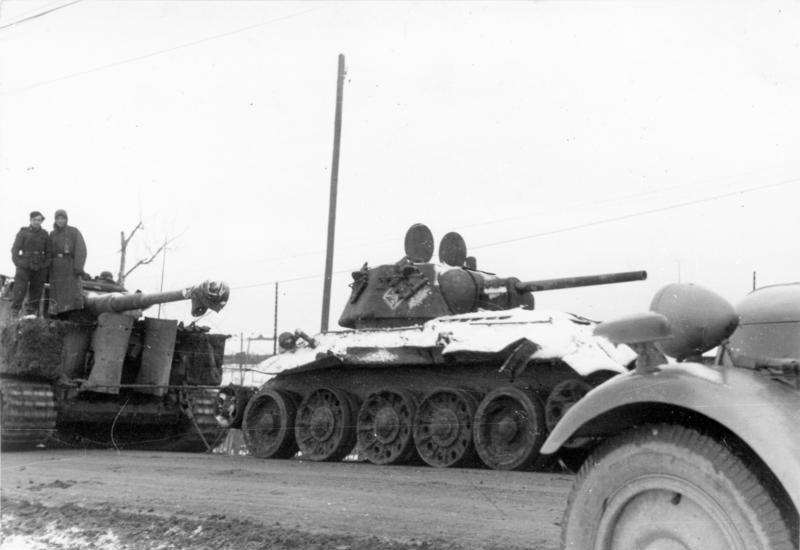
- A German Tiger tank and knocked-out Soviet T-34 tank during the fighting in the southern Soviet Union.
Date	12–23 December 1942
Location	Southwest of Stalingrad
Result	Soviet victory

Belligerents
Soviet Union	Germany; Romania; Italy

Commanders and leaders
(Soviet Union) Andrey Yeryomenko (Soviet Union) Rodion Malinovsky (Soviet Union) Aleksandr Vasilevsky	(Nazi Germany) Erich von Manstein (Nazi Germany) Hermann Hoth (Nazi Germany) Karl-Adolf Hollidt (Kingdom of Romania) Petre Dumitrescu (Fascist Italy) Italo Gariboldi

Strength
115,000 personnel 329 tanks 1,133 artillery guns 220 aircraft	124,000 personnel 211 tanks 852 artillery guns 500 aircraft

Casualties and losses
Unknown	15,751 casualties (Note: From 11 to 31 December 1942.): 3,700 killed; 10,874 wounded; 1,086 missing

Operation Winter Storm (German: Unternehmen Wintergewitter) was a German offensive in December 1942 during World War II, in which the German 4th Panzer Army failed to break the Soviet encirclement of the German 6th Army during the Battle of Stalingrad.

In late November 1942, the Red Army completed Operation Uranus, encircling some 300,000 Axis personnel in and around the city of Stalingrad. German forces within the Stalingrad pocket and directly outside were reorganized (22 November 1942) into Army Group Don and placed under the command of Field Marshal Erich von Manstein. The Red Army continued to allocate as many resources as possible to the planned Operation Saturn to isolate Army Group A from the rest of the German Army. To remedy the situation, the Luftwaffe attempted to supply German forces in Stalingrad through an air bridge. When the Luftwaffe failed and it became obvious that a break out could succeed only if launched as early as possible, Manstein decided on a relief effort.

Originally, Manstein was promised four panzer divisions. Due to German reluctance to weaken certain sectors by redeploying German units, the task of opening a corridor to the encircled German 6th Army fell to the depleted 4th Panzer Army, under the command of Hermann Hoth. The German force was pitted against several Soviet armies tasked with the destruction of the encircled German forces and their offensive around the lower Chir River.

The German offensive caught the Red Army by surprise and made large gains on the first day. The spearhead forces enjoyed air support and defeated counterattacks by Soviet troops. By 13 December, Soviet resistance had slowed the German advance considerably, although German forces took the area surrounding the town of Verkhne-Kumskiy and crossed the river Myshkova. However, on 16 December the Red Army launched Operation Little Saturn and crushed the Italian 8th Army on Army Group Don's left flank, threatening the rear of Manstein's force. Faced with mounting casualties and stiff Soviet opposition, the 4th Panzer Army continued its attempt to open a corridor to the 6th Army on 18–19 December, but was unsuccessful.

Manstein called off the assault on 23 December and by Christmas Eve the 4th Panzer Army began to withdraw to its starting position. Due to the failure of the 6th Army to break out from the Soviet encirclement, the Red Army could continue the "strangulation" of German forces in Stalingrad.

== Background ==
On 23 November 1942, the Red Army closed its encirclement of Axis forces in Stalingrad. Nearly 300,000 German and Romanian soldiers were trapped in the city and vicinity of Stalingrad by roughly 1.1 million Soviet personnel. Adolf Hitler appointed Field Marshal Erich von Manstein as commander of a new Army Group Don. Composed of the German 4th Panzer and 6th Armies, as well as the Third and Fourth Romanian Armies, Manstein's new army group was between German Army Groups A and B. Instead of attempting an immediate breakout, German high command decided that the trapped forces would remain in Stalingrad and hold out. The encircled German forces were to be supplied by air, requiring roughly 680 t (750 short tons) of supplies per day. The fleet of 500 Luftwaffe transport aircraft was insufficient for the task. Many of the aircraft were hardly serviceable in the rough Soviet winter; in early December, more German cargo planes were destroyed in accidents than by Soviet fighter aircraft. The 6th Army received less than 20 percent of its daily needs. Furthermore, the Germans were still threatened by Soviet forces which still held portions of the Volga River's west bank in Stalingrad.

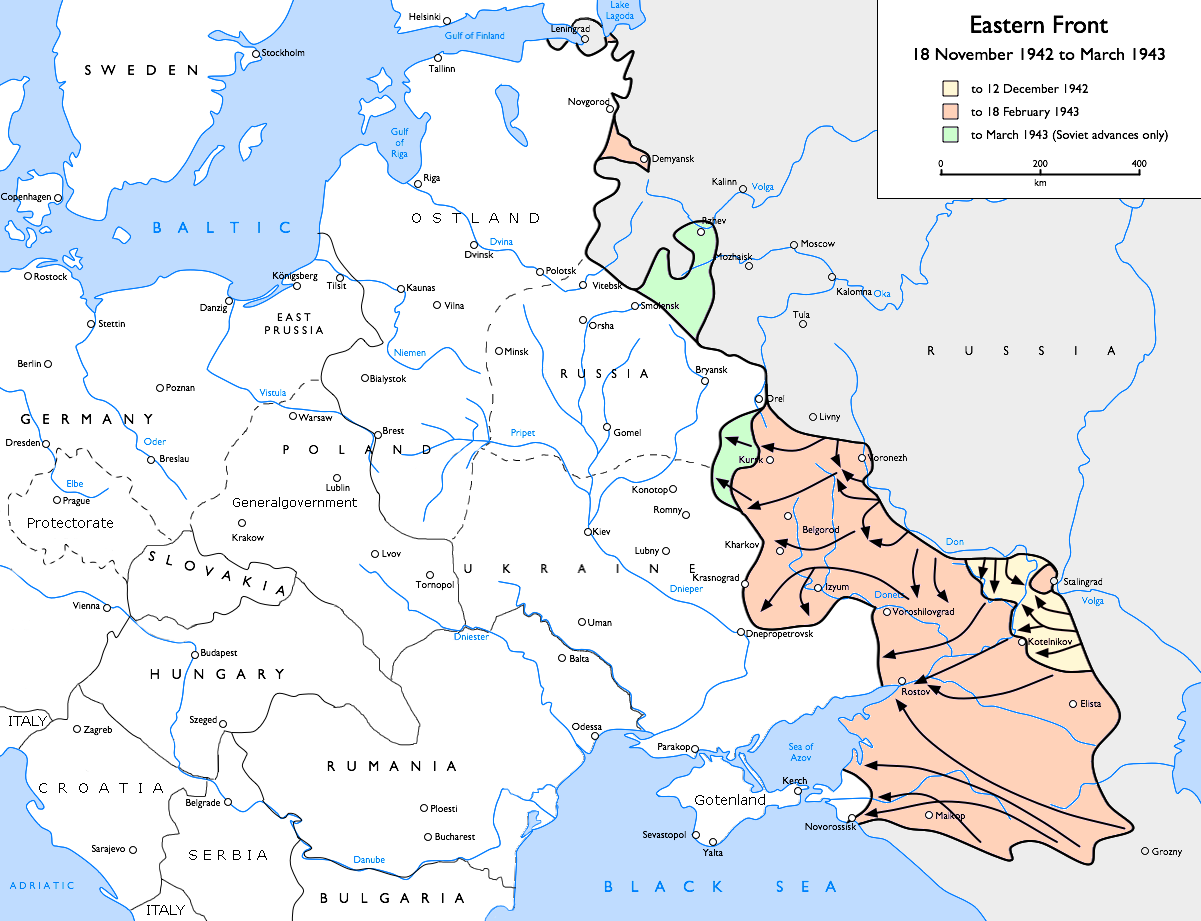
The Eastern Front between 19 November 1942 and 1 March 1943

Given the unexpected size of German forces closed off in Stalingrad, on 23 November Stavka (Soviet Armed Forces High Command) decided to strengthen the outer encirclement preparing to destroy the trapped Axis forces. On 24 November, several Soviet formations began to dig in against possible German incursions from the west. The Soviets also reinforced the encircling forces in order to prevent a breakout by the 6th Army and other Axis units. This tied down over half of the Red Army's strength in the area. Planning for Operation Saturn began on 25 November to destroy the Italian 8th Army and cut communications between German forces west of the Don River and those operating in the Caucasus. Planning also began for Operation Koltso (Ring), which aimed at reducing German forces in the Stalingrad pocket.

As Operation Uranus concluded, German forces inside the encirclement were too weak to attempt a breakout on their own. Half of their remaining armor had been lost during the defensive fighting and there was a severe lack of fuel and ammunition for the surviving vehicles, given that the Luftwaffe was not able to provide adequate aerial supply. Manstein proposed a counterstrike to break the Soviet encirclement of Stalingrad, codenamed Operation Winter Storm (Unternehmen Wintergewitter). On 28 November, Manstein sent Hitler a detailed report on Army Group Don's situation, including the strength of the 6th Army and an assessment of the ammunition for German artillery inside the city.

Stavka postponed Operation Saturn until 16 December, as Soviet forces struggled to clear German defenders from the lower Chir River. The Red Army's offensive in the area commenced on 30 November, involving around 50,000 soldiers, which forced Manstein to use the 48th Panzer Corps to hold the area. The 5th Tank Army was reinforced by the new 5th Shock Army, drawn from existing formations of the South-Western and Stalingrad Fronts; the 5th Tank Army totaled nearly 71,000 men, 252 tanks and 814 guns. The Soviet offensive succeeded in tying down the 48th Panzer Corps, originally chosen to lead one of the main attacks on the Soviet encirclement. The Soviets were forewarned of the impending German assault when they discovered the 6th Panzer Division unloading at the town of Morozovsk and held back several armies from the attack on the lower Chir River to prepare for a possible breakout attempt by German forces inside Stalingrad.

== Comparison of forces ==
=== German ===
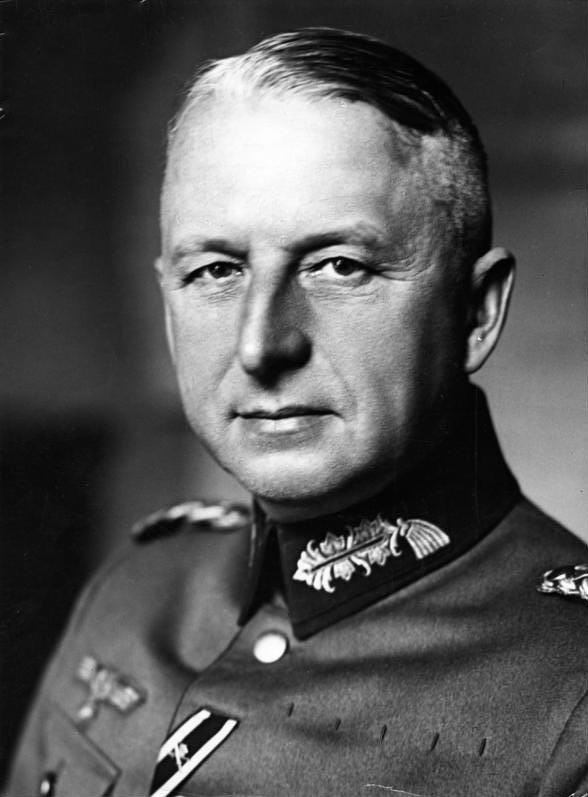
Field Marshal Erich von Manstein, commander of Army Group Don at the time of the battle

The relief operation was originally scheduled to include the LVII Panzer Corps of the 4th Panzer Army, under the command of General Friedrich Kirchner, including the 6th and 23rd Panzer Divisions, and Army Detachment Hollidt, consisting of three infantry divisions and two armored divisions (11th and 22nd Panzer Divisions). In total, it was expected that four Panzer divisions, four infantry divisions and three Luftwaffe Field Divisions were to take part in Operation Winter Storm. They would be tasked with temporarily opening a passage to the 6th Army. The Luftwaffe field divisions—formed of non-combat soldiers, headquarters staffs and unit-less Luftwaffe and Heer personnel—were poorly trained and lacked seasoned officers and enlisted soldiers, as well as sufficient anti-tank and artillery guns. Many of the personnel promised for the relief effort never arrived, partly due to the poor transportation service to the front, while some units originally chosen to be transferred under the command of Army Group Don, were retained by their original commands. Other units in Army Group Don were in no shape to conduct offensive operations, due to losses sustained in the past month of combat, while many new formations which had been promised did not arrive on time.

On the other hand, the 11th Panzer Division was one of the most complete German armored divisions on the Eastern Front since it had just been transferred out of the German Army's reserve. The 6th Panzer Division was also complete because it had been transferred to Manstein's control from Western Europe. However, the usefulness of the 11th Panzer Division was compromised when the Soviets launched their offensive against forces in the lower Chir River area, as this tied Army Detachment Hollidt down on the defensive. Because of this, and because Manstein believed that a thrust originating from the position of Army Detachment Hollidt would be too obvious, the German field marshal decided to use the 4th Panzer Army and the LVII Panzer Corps as the main components of the relief operation. However, despite attempts by the Germans to build strength for the offensive, their position along the lower Chir River became tenuous; the Soviet breakthrough was only blunted by the arrival of the 11th Panzer Division, which was able to destroy the bulk of two Soviet tank brigades. Consequently, the XLVIII Panzer Corps became embroiled in the defensive battles for the Chir River, as the Soviets pushed in an attempt to overrun the airfield at Tatsinskaya (being used to resupply German forces in Stalingrad by air).

Although the LVII Panzer Corps was reluctantly released to Army Group Don, by Army Group A, the 17th Panzer Division was ordered back to its original area of concentration, and did not prepare to go back to Army Group Don, until 10 days after it had been asked for. In light of the troubles in building up sufficient forces, and seeing that the Soviets were concentrating more mechanization on the Chir River, Manstein decided to launch Operation Winter Storm using the 4th Panzer Army. Manstein hoped that the 6th Army would launch an offensive of its own, from the opposite side, upon the receipt of the code signal Thunderclap. Manstein was gambling on Hitler accepting that the only plausible method to avoid the demise of the 6th Army was allowing it to break out, and assumed that General Paulus would agree to order his forces to escape the Stalingrad pocket. On 10 December, Manstein communicated to Paulus that the relief operation would commence in 24 hours.

==== Order of Battle of 4. Panzer Armee (Dec 1942 – Jan 1943) ====
Data from AxisHistory.Com

- 15. Lw. Feld-Division
- LVII Panzer Korps
  - 17. Panzer-Division
  - 23. Panzer-Division
  - 5. SS-Panzer-Division "Wiking" (in transit until January)
  - 16. Infanterie-Division (elements)

==== Order of Battle for the XXXXVIII Panzer Korps (January 1st, 1943) ====
Data from AxisHistory.Com

- 6. Panzer-Division
- 306. Infanterie-Division
- Gruppe Pfeiffer

=== Soviet ===
For the purpose of Operation Uranus, Soviet Marshal Georgy Zhukov deployed eleven Soviet armies. In an effort to bolster the offensive capabilities of the Stalingrad Front, over 420 tanks, 111,000 soldiers and 556 artillery guns, were shipped over the Volga River in a period of three weeks. The Red Army and Red Air Force were able to amass over one million soldiers, 13,500 artillery guns, 890 tanks and 1,100 combat aircraft, organized into 66 rifle divisions, five tank corps, 14 tank brigades, a single mechanized brigade, a cavalry corps, and 127 artillery and mortar regiments. As the encirclement closed and the Soviets continued with secondary operations, the 51st Army was positioned on the edge of the outer encirclement with 34,000 men and 77 tanks. South of them was the 28th Army, with 44,000 soldiers, 40 tanks and 707 artillery guns and mortars. Concurrently, the Red Army began building its strength for Operation Saturn, in which it would aim to isolate and destroy German Army Group A in the Caucasus.

== German offensive ==
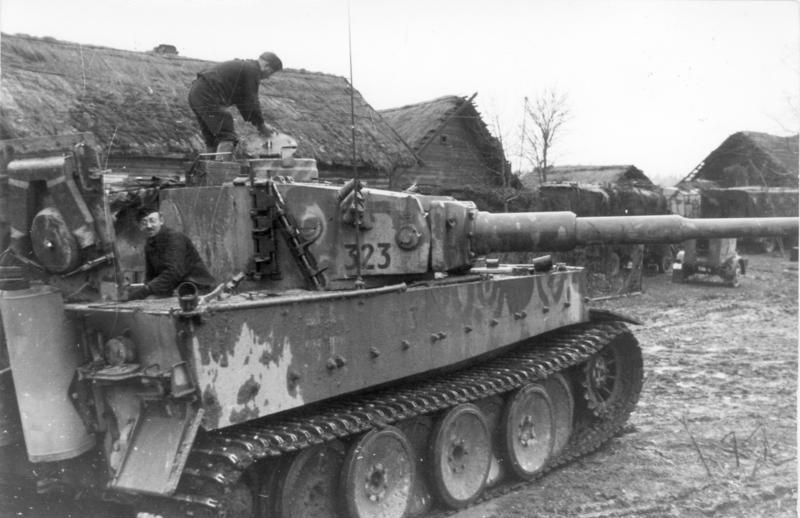
A battalion of Tiger I tanks was deployed to Army Group Don to strengthen the German drive to Stalingrad.

On 12 December 1942, the LVII Panzer Corps of the Fourth Panzer Army began its north-eastward drive toward German forces trapped in the Stalingrad pocket. The 6th and 23rd Panzer Divisions made large gains, surprising the Red Army and threatening the rear of the 51st Army. The German drive was due to be spearheaded by the 503rd Heavy Tank Battalion of Tiger I tanks but the unit did not embark on its transport to the Eastern Front until 21 December 1942 and did not see battle until early January 1943, along the Manytsch River. At first, Winter Storm made rapid progress. Some units were able to travel up to 60 km (37 mi) on the first day. The Germans were aided by surprise, as Stavka had not expected the German offensive to begin so soon, while General Aleksandr Vasilevsky was unable to detach the 2nd Guards Army and use it as a blocking force against Manstein's spearheads.

The 6th Panzer Division was able to capture Soviet artillery intact. Soviet resistance decreased noticeably, after the 6th and 23rd Panzer Divisions had overrun the main body of Russian infantry. The 302nd Rifle Division of the 51st Army was overrun by the end of 12 December. Although Soviet infantry quickly reinforced villages in the path of the German drive, the Red Army's cavalry in the area was exhausted from weeks of combat and was incapable of putting up serious resistance. Despite early gains, the LVII Panzer Corps was unable to achieve decisive results. There were also reports of severe pressure building against the 23rd Panzer Division, despite headway made on the first day of the German offensive.

On 13 December, the 6th Panzer Division made contact with the Soviet 5th Tank Army, which was reducing the German defenses around the Chir River. German forces were able to engage and defeat Soviet armor as the former forced the crossing of the Aksay River. A big armored battle began around the village of Verkhne-Kumskiy. The village was on the most convenient south–north road to Stalingrad, whereas the barren steppe around was riddled with ravines and gullies covered with deep snow; Verkhne-Kumskiy was unavoidable for large armored forces to move north towards the Myshkova River. On the Soviet side, Volsky's 4th Mechanized Corps was also driving at full speed towards the village. The corps had not yet had time to replenish personnel and material after the November offensive battles; it barely fielded 100 operable tanks and another 50 were in need of repair. Half of these were T-34, capable of opposing Panzer Mk IIIs and IVs, while the rest were light T-70s, only useful against infantry or armored cars. The road towards the encircled 6th Army was almost free and if the 4th Mechanized Corps had not intervened, Hoth would have had a greater chance to reach Paulus.

Although they suffered many losses, the Soviet forces were able to push German forces back to the banks of the Aksay River by the end of the day, while failing to retake the town. The losses sustained by the Red Army in the vicinity of Verkhne-Kumskiy allowed the 6th Panzer Division to enjoy a brief superiority in tank numbers. Fighting for Verkhne-Kumskiy continued for three days as the Red Army counterattacked the German bridgeheads across the Aksay River and German defenders in the town. The Germans were able to pin Soviet tanks in Verkhne-Kumskiy and destroy them using well-emplaced anti-tank guns. With support from the Luftwaffe, the Germans were able to achieve a local success and began to push toward the Myshkova River. The 6th Panzer Division suffered heavy losses during its drive and took a brief respite after the battle to recondition. Minor damage to surviving tanks was repaired and the majority of the tanks incapacitated, during the fighting at Verkhne-Kumskiy were repaired.

=== Soviet response: 13–18 December ===
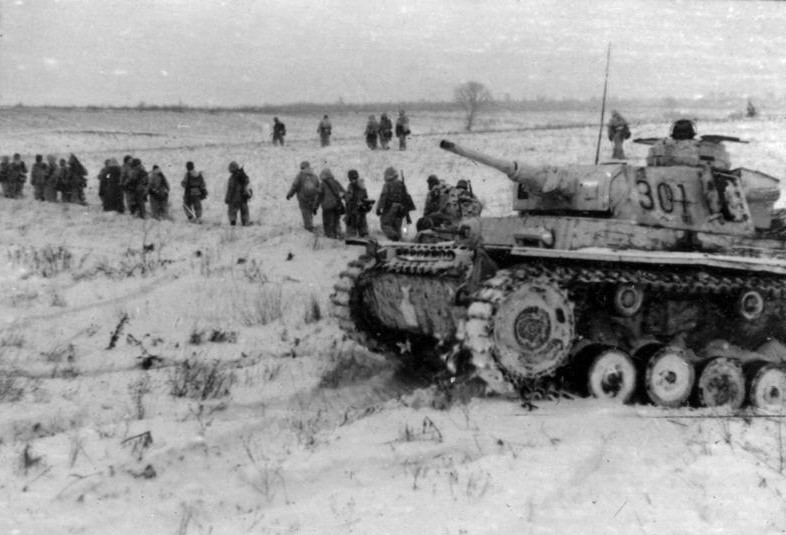
German Panzer III in the Southern Soviet Union in December 1942

The Fourth Panzer Army forced Stavka to recalculate its intentions for Operation Saturn and on 13 December Stalin and Stavka authorized the transfer of the 2nd Guards Army from the Don Front to the Stalingrad Front, where it would be ready on 15 December. This army had a strength of roughly 90,000 soldiers, organized into three Guards Rifle Corps (the 1st, 13th and 2nd). Operation Saturn was reduced to Operation Little Saturn, the breaking through of the Italian 8th Army and then engaging Army Group Don in the rear. The offensive was also changed from a southward to a southeastern direction and the start date was pushed back to 16 December. The 4th Mechanized and 13th Tank Corps continued to counterattack against German forces in the vicinity of the Aksay River, trying to delay their advance in anticipation of the arrival of the 2nd Guards Army.

The Soviet 1st and 3rd Guard Armies, in conjunction with the Soviet 6th Army, launched Operation Little Saturn on 16 December. Despite stubborn resistance from Italian troops, the Red Army was able to partially overrun the Italian 8th Army by 18 December. The breakthrough—even if small and quickly contained—proved a possible threat to Army Group Don's left flank, while the city of Rostov-on-Don was threatened by the 3rd Guards Army. This and the losses sustained by the German armored divisions forcing their way to the Myshkova river, forced Manstein to reconsider the offensive. Manstein decided that he could not defend his left flank and continue the attempt to relieve the 6th Army. Although the 6th Panzer Division was able to cross the Myshkova River by the night of 19 December, the LVII Panzer Corps had still not made major advances against increased Soviet opposition, despite the arrival of the 17th Panzer Division; it seemed as if the corps would have to go on the defensive. The Soviet Tatsinskaya Raid managed to destroy the airfield and several dozen aircraft being used by the Luftwaffe to supply forces inside the Stalingrad pocket, forcing Manstein to order the XLVIII Panzer Corps on the defensive, instead of reserving it to bolster his forces directed toward the breakthrough to Stalingrad.

=== Collapse: 19–23 December ===
By 19 December, the LVII Panzer Corps managed to break through the Aksay River and drive within 48 km (30 mi) of the southern edge of the 6th Army's front. Colonel Wilhelm Adam makes the point that the 6th Army tanks only had fuel for 30 km, after which they would need fuel and ammunition flown in to go any further. The 6th Army did not have the strength to attempt a breakout, with less than 70 serviceable tanks and dwindling supplies, while its infantry were in no condition to attempt an attack in the blizzard which had developed over the past few days. Manstein ordered the 6th Panzer Division to end its offensive and redeploy to the southern Chir River, to bolster the defenses there against the Soviet offensive, on 23 December. By 24 December, the Fourth Panzer Army was in full retreat, returning to its starting position. The failure to break through to the 6th Army caused Operation Winter Storm to collapse on that same day, as Army Group Don returned to the defensive.

== Aftermath ==
With the German relief effort defeated, Stavka was free to concentrate on the destruction of Axis forces in the Stalingrad pocket and the westward expansion of the Red Army's Winter offensive. The Red Army was able to bring to bear almost 150,000 personnel and 820 tanks against the retreating 4th Panzer Army and although Volsky's 4th Mechanized Corps (renamed 3rd Guard Mechanized Corps on 18 December 1942) was withdrawn to be refitted, the 51st Army, the 1st Guards Rifle and 7th Tank Corps struck at German units withdrawing between the Mushkova and Aksai Rivers. In three days, the attacking Soviet units broke through the Romanian positions guarding the LVII Panzer Corps' flank and threatened the 4th Panzer Army from the south, forcing the Germans to continue withdrawing to the southwest. All the while, the XLVIII Panzer Corps—led mainly by the 11th Panzer Division—strove to maintain its position along the Chir River. Despite success, the XLVIII Panzer Corps was rushed to the defense of Rostov as a Soviet breakthrough seemed imminent after the partial collapse of the Italian 8th Army. As the Red Army pursued the 4th Panzer Army toward the Aksay River and broke through the German defense on the banks of the Chir River, it also began to prepare for Operation Ring—the reduction of the forces in Stalingrad.

The loss of the airfield and transport aircraft prevented further resupply for German troops; as food ran out, they resorted to eating horse meat. By the end of 1942, the distance between the German 6th Army and forces outside of the encirclement was over 65 km (40 mi), and most of the German formations in the area were extremely weak. Hitler's insistence in holding Stalingrad to the last risked the existence of the 6th Army. The end of the German offensive also allowed the Red Army to continue in its efforts to cut off German forces in the Caucasus, which would begin in the middle of January. On the other hand, the encirclement of the 6th Army and the operations to destroy it tied down a considerable number of Soviet troops, which affected Soviet operations on other sectors.

== Bibliography ==
- Beevor, Antony (1998). Stalingrad: The Fateful Siege: 1942–1943. Harmondsworth, United Kingdom: Penguin Putnam Inc. ISBN 0-670-87095-1 – via Archive Foundation.
- Bell, Kelly (Fall 2006). "Struggle for Stalin's Skies". WWII History: Russian Front. Special. Herndon, Virginia: Sovereign Media. ISSN 1539-5456.
- Clark, Alan (1965). Barbarossa: The Russian-German Conflict, 1941–1945. New York City, New York: William Morrow. ISBN 0-688-04268-6.
- Cooper, Matthew (1978). The German Army 1933–1945. Lanham, Maryland: Scarborough House. ISBN 0-8128-8519-8.
- Erickson, John (1975). The Road to Stalingrad: Stalin's War With Germany. New Haven, Connecticut: Yale University Press. ISBN 0-300-07812-9 – via Archive Foundation.
- Erickson, John (1983). The Road to Berlin: Stalin's War with Germany. New Haven, Connecticut: Yale University Press. ISBN 0-300-07813-7.
- Glantz, David M. (January 1996). "Soviet Military Strategy During the Second Period of War (November 1942 – December 1943): A Reappraisal". The Journal of Military History. LX (1). Society for Military History: 115–150. doi:10.2307/2944451. JSTOR 2944451.
- Glantz, David M.; House, Jonathan (1995). When Titans Clashed: How the Red Army Stopped Hitler. Lawrence, Kansas: Kansas University Press. ISBN 0-7006-0717-X.
- Heiber, Helmut; Glantz, David M. (2003). Hitler and his Generals: Military Conferences 1942–1945. New York City, New York: Enigma Books. ISBN 1-929631-09-X.
- Isaev, A. B. (2008). Сталинград. За Волгой для нас земли нет (in Russian). Moscow, Russia: Exmo. ISBN 978-5-699-26236-6.
- McCarthy, Peter; Syryon, Mike (2002). Panzerkrieg: The Rise and Fall of Hitler's Tank Divisions. New York City, New York: Carroll & Graf. ISBN 0-7867-1009-8 – via Archive Foundation.
- McTaggart, Pat (Fall 2006). "Soviet Circle of Iron". WWII History: Russian Front. Special. Herndon, Virginia: Sovereign Media. ISSN 1539-5456.
- Raus, Erhard (2002). Panzers on the Eastern Front: General Erhard Raus and his Panzer Divisions in Russia 1941–1945. Mechanicsburg, PA: Military Book Club. ISBN 0-7394-2644-3.
- von Manstein, Erich (1982). Lost Victories. St. Paul, MN: Zenith Press. ISBN 978-0-7603-2054-9.
- Joly, Anton (2017). Stalingrad Battle Atlas: Operation Winter Storm. Vol. IV. Paris, France: Staldata Publications. ISBN 979-10-93222-09-7.
