= Operation Gallop =

1943 military operation during World War II

- Part of the Eastern Front of World War II
Date	29 January – 18 February 1943
Location	Donbas
Result	German victory

Belligerents
Germany	Soviet Union

Commanders and leaders
(Nazi Germany) Erich von Manstein	(Soviet Union) Nikolai Vatutin

Strength
Initial strength: 160,000 men; 160 tanks	Initial strength: 325,000 men; 362 tanks

Operation Gallop (Russian: Операция Скачок, romanized: Operatsiya Skachok) was a Soviet Army operation on the Eastern Front of World War II. The operation was part of a series of counteroffensives after the encirclement of Stalingrad (now Volgograd) following the German Summer offensive in 1942. The Soviet High Command expected a collapse of the German front line in southern Russia and northeast Ukraine and launched a number of counteroffensives to exploit the weak German situation. The operation was launched on 29 January 1943 in conjunction with Operation Star and aimed against Voroshilovgrad (Luhansk), Donetsk, and then towards the Sea of Azov to cut off all German forces east of Donetsk. It was conducted by the Southwestern Front, commanded by Nikolai Fyodorovich Vatutin. The offensive was initially successful as the Soviets broke through the weak German lines. The Germans were pushed back to a line west of Voroshilovgrad.

In the face of a total collapse in the south the German command arranged a number of reorganisations and created a new Army Group South out of the shattered forces of the old Army Groups A, B, and Don, under the command of Erich von Manstein. The Soviet offensives, initially successful, ultimately outran their supply lines, and during a counteroffensive at Kharkov, the Germans were able to regain momentum. The result would be a last German strategic offensive at Kursk.

== See also ==
- Case Blue

== Bibliography ==
- Glantz, David M. (1991). From the Don to the Dnepr: Soviet Offensive Operations, December 1942 – August 1943. New York: Routledge. ISBN 978-1-135-18130-7.
- Glantz, David M. (1995). When Titans Clashed: How the Red Army Stopped Hitler. Lawrence, KS: University Press of Kansas. ISBN 0-70060-899-0.
- Nipe, George M. Jr. (2000). Last Victory in Russia: The SS-Panzerkorps and Manstein's Kharkov Counteroffensive—February–March 1943. Atglen, PA: Schiffer Publishing. ISBN 0-76431-186-7.
