= Erich von Manstein =

German field marshal (1887–1973)

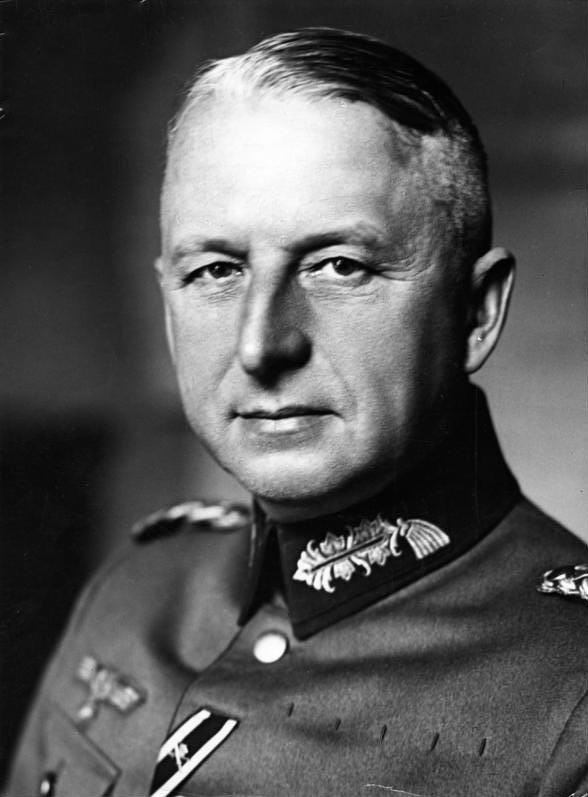
- Manstein in 1938
- Born: Fritz Erich Georg Eduard von Lewinski; 24 November 1887; Berlin, Province of Brandenburg, Kingdom of Prussia, German Empire
- Died: 10 June 1973 (aged 85); Irschenhausen, Bavaria, West Germany
- Burial place: Dorfmark, Bad Fallingbostel, Lower Saxony
- Spouse: Jutta Sibylle von Loesch (m. 1920; died 1966)
- Children: 3
- Relatives: Eduard von Lewinski (biological father); Albrecht Gustav von Manstein (adoptive grandfather); Oskar von Sperling (maternal grandfather); Paul von Hindenburg (uncle)
- Military career
- Allegiance: German Empire; German Reich; Nazi Germany
- Branch: Imperial German Army; Reichswehr; German Army
- Service years: 1906–1945
- Rank: Generalfeldmarschall
- Commands: 18th Infantry Division; XXXVIII Army Corps; LVI Panzer Corps; 11th Army; Army Group Don; Army Group South
- Conflicts: World War I; World War II; Invasion of Poland; Battle of France; Operation Barbarossa; Battle of the Sea of Azov; Siege of Sevastopol; Battle of the Kerch Peninsula; Siege of Leningrad; Sinyavino Offensive; Battle of Stalingrad; Operation Winter Storm; Operation Little Saturn; Operation Gallop; Third Battle of Kharkov; Battle of Kursk; Operation Citadel; Operation Rumyantsev; Donbas Offensives; 1st Donbas Offensive; 2nd Donbas Offensive; Dnieper campaign; Battle of Kiev; Dnieper-Carpathian Offensive; Zhitomir-Berdichev Offensive; Korsun-Cherkassy Pocket; Rovno-Lutsk Offensive; Kamenets-Podolsky Pocket
- Awards: Knight's Cross of the Iron Cross with Oak Leaves and Swords
- Other work: Served as military advisor to the West German government
- Criminal information
- Conviction: War crimes (9 counts)
- Trial: Trial of Erich von Manstein
- Penalty: 18 years imprisonment; commuted to 12 years imprisonment

Details
- Victims: Soviet prisoners of war; Soviet civilians; Ukrainian Jews

Erich von Manstein (born Fritz Erich Georg Eduard von Lewinski; 24 November 1887 – 10 June 1973) was a German military officer who served as a Generalfeldmarschall (Field marshal) in the Heer (Army) of Nazi Germany during World War II. He was subsequently convicted of war crimes and sentenced to 18 years imprisonment, but served fewer than four years before being released in 1953.

Born into an aristocratic Prussian family with a long history of military service, Manstein joined the army at a young age and saw service on both the Western and Eastern Front during the First World War (1914–18). He rose to the rank of captain by the end of the war and was active in the inter-war period helping Germany rebuild its armed forces. In September 1939, during the invasion of Poland at the beginning of the Second World War, he served as Chief of Staff to Gerd von Rundstedt's Army Group South. Adolf Hitler chose Manstein's strategy for the invasion of France of May 1940.

Anticipating a firm Allied reaction, should the main thrust of the invasion take place through the Netherlands, Manstein devised an innovative operation to invade France – later known as the Sichelschnitt ("sickle cut") – that called for an attack through the woods of the Ardennes and a rapid drive to the English Channel, thus cutting off the French and Allied armies in Belgium and Flanders. Attaining the rank of general at the end of the campaign, he was active in the invasion of the Soviet Union in June 1941. He led the Axis forces in the siege of Sevastopol (1941–1942) and the Battle of the Kerch Peninsula, and was promoted to field marshal on 1 July 1942, after which he participated in the siege of Leningrad.

In December 1942, during the catastrophic Battle of Stalingrad, Manstein commanded a failed relief effort ("Operation Winter Storm"). Later known as the "backhand blow", Manstein's counteroffensive in the Third Battle of Kharkov (February–March 1943) regained substantial territory and resulted in the destruction of three Soviet armies and the retreat of three others. He was one of the primary commanders at the Battle of Kursk (July–August 1943). His disagreements with Hitler over the conduct of the war led to his dismissal in March 1944. He never obtained another command and was taken prisoner by the British in August 1945, three months after Germany's defeat.

Manstein gave testimony at the main Nuremberg trials of war criminals in August 1946, and prepared a paper that, along with his later memoirs, helped cultivate the myth of the clean Wehrmacht – the myth that the German armed forces were not culpable for the atrocities of the Holocaust. In 1949 he was tried in Hamburg for war crimes and was convicted on nine of seventeen counts, including the poor treatment of prisoners of war and failing to protect civilian lives in his sphere of operations. His sentence of eighteen years in prison was later reduced to twelve, and he served fewer than four years before being released in 1953.

As a military advisor to the West German government in the mid-1950s, he helped re-establish the armed forces. His memoir, Verlorene Siege (1955), translated into English as Lost Victories, was highly critical of Hitler's leadership, and dealt with only the military aspects of the war, ignoring its political and ethical contexts. Manstein died near Munich in 1973.

== Early life ==
Manstein was born Fritz Erich Georg Eduard von Lewinski in Berlin into the noble Lewinski family of the Polish Brochwicz clan, the tenth son of a Prussian aristocrat and artillery general, Eduard von Lewinski (1829–1906), and Helene von Sperling (1847–1910). His father's family had Kashubian ancestry and was entitled to use the Brochwicz coat of arms (Brochwicz III). Hedwig von Sperling (1852–1925), Helene's younger sister, was married to Lieutenant General Georg von Manstein (1844–1913); the couple was unable to have children, so they adopted Erich. They had previously adopted Erich's cousin Martha, the daughter of Helene's and Hedwig's deceased brother.

Manstein's biological and adoptive fathers were both Prussian generals, as were his mother's brother and both his grandfathers. His paternal grandfather, Albrecht Gustav von Manstein, had led a corps in the Franco-Prussian War of 1870–71, and maternal grandfather, Oskar von Sperling, was the chief of staff of First Army. Sixteen relatives on each side of his family were military officers, many of whom rose to the rank of general. Paul von Hindenburg, the future Generalfeldmarschall and President of Germany, was his uncle; Hindenburg's wife, Gertrud, was the sister of Hedwig and Helene.

Manstein attended the Imperial Lyzeum, a Catholic Gymnasium in Strasbourg, from 1894 to 1899. Then he entered the Cadet Corps. As a cadet, Manstein was reported to be intelligent and capable. In March 1906, after six years in the cadet corps in Plön and Groß-Lichterfelde, he was commissioned into the Third Foot Guards Regiment (Garde zu Fuß) as an ensign. He was promoted to lieutenant in January 1907 and in October 1913 began the three-year officer training programme at the Prussian War Academy. However, Manstein only completed the first year of the programme, as when the First World War began in August 1914 all students of the academy were ordered to report for active service. He never completed the remainder of his general staff officer training.

== Early military career ==
=== First World War ===
During the First World War, Manstein served on both the German Western and Eastern Fronts. At the beginning of the war, he was promoted to lieutenant and participated in the invasion of Belgium with the 2nd Guard Reserve Infantry Regiment. In August 1914, he took part in the capture of Namur, the site of a massive citadel surrounded by outlying forts. In September, Manstein's unit was one of two transferred to East Prussia and attached to the Eighth Army, commanded by Hindenburg. After seeing action in the First Battle of the Masurian Lakes, his unit was soon reassigned to the Ninth Army, which was in the process of advancing from Upper Silesia to Warsaw. Overstretched, the Ninth Army was forced to withdraw in the face of a Russian counterattack, and on 16 November, Manstein was wounded during the retreat when he was among a detachment that stormed a Russian entrenchment. He was shot in the left shoulder and the left knee; one bullet hit his sciatic nerve, causing the leg to be numb. Recovery took six months in hospital in Beuthen and Wiesbaden.

After a period of home leave, on 17 June 1915, Manstein was reassigned as an assistant general staff officer of operations to the 10th Army, commanded by Max von Gallwitz. Soon promoted to captain, he learned first-hand how to plan and conduct offensive operations as the Tenth Army undertook successful attacks on Poland, Lithuania, Montenegro, and Albania. During offensive operations at Verdun in early 1916, Manstein was stationed with Gallwitz and his staff at a new headquarters near the action. He next served as a staff supply officer under General Fritz von Below and chief of staff Fritz von Lossberg at a command post near the River Somme; the area was the scene of several battles over the course of the war. British and French operations from July to November 1916 forced a German withdrawal over the winter to the Hindenburg Line, a series of defensive positions between Verdun and Lens. Manstein continued to serve under Below until October 1917, when he was transferred as chief of staff to the 4th Cavalry Division, serving in Riga during the German occupation of the area. As a result of the signing of the Treaty of Brest-Litovsk in March 1918, Manstein's unit was no longer needed on the Eastern Front; he was reassigned to the 213th Infantry Division near Reims. The German Imperial Army saw some minor successes in the area but was beginning to lose the war. The armistice was signed on 11 November 1918.

=== Inter-war era ===
Manstein married Jutta Sibylle von Loesch, the daughter of a Silesian landowner, in 1920. He proposed marriage after having known her for only three days. She died in 1966. They had three children: a daughter, Gisela (born 1921), and two sons, Gero (born 1922) and Rüdiger (born 1929). Gero died on the battlefield in the northern sector of the Eastern Front on 29 October 1942 while serving as a lieutenant in the Wehrmacht. Gisela was married to Major Edel-Heinrich Zachariae-Lingenthal, a highly decorated officer who commanded II. Panzer-Regiment 15 during the Second World War.

Manstein remained in the armed forces after the war ended. In 1918 he volunteered for a staff position with the Frontier Defence Force in Breslau and served there until 1919. As part of Gruppenkommando II, he participated in the restructuring of the German Imperial Army of 500,000 men into the Reichswehr, the army of the Weimar Republic (restricted to 100,000 men by the Versailles Treaty). Recognised from an early age as a talented and intelligent commander, Manstein was chosen as one of only 4,000 officers permitted under the treaty. In 1921 he was appointed company commander of the sixth company of the 5th Prussian Infantry Regiment and next served as a staff officer for Wehrkreiskommando II and IV, teaching military history and tactics until 1927. On 1 February 1927 he was promoted to major and served with the General Staff at the Ministry of the Reichswehr in Berlin, visiting other countries to learn about their military facilities and helping to draft mobilisation plans for the army. Promoted to lieutenant colonel, he was given command of the light infantry battalion of the 4th Infantry Regiment, serving with that unit until 1934. On 30 January 1933 the Nazi Party seized power in Germany and destroyed the Weimar Republic within a few months. In violation of the Versailles treaty, the Reichswehr had been secretly re-arming since the 1920s; the new government formally renounced the Treaty and proceeded with large scale re-armament and expansion of the military.

Von Manstein was moved back to Berlin as full colonel in February 1934, serving as chief of staff of 3rd Division (Wehrkreiskommando III) under Erwin von Witzleben. On 1 July 1935 he was appointed the Head of the Operations Branch of the Army General Staff (Generalstab des Heeres), part of the Army High Command (Oberkommando des Heeres – OKH). During his tenure there, Manstein was one of the people responsible for the development of Fall Rot (Case Red), a defensive plan to protect Germany from attack by France. During this period Manstein came into contact with Heinz Guderian and Oswald Lutz, who advocated drastic changes in warfare, emphasising the role of the Panzer. However, officers like Ludwig Beck, Chief of the Army General Staff, were against such drastic changes, and therefore Manstein proposed an alternative: the development of Sturmgeschütze (StuG), self-propelled assault guns that would provide heavy direct-fire support to infantry. In World War II, the resulting StuG vehicles proved to be among the most successful and cost-effective German weapons.

He was promoted to Generalmajor in October 1936, becoming the Deputy Chief of Staff (Oberquartiermeister I) to General Beck. On 4 February 1938, Manstein was transferred to the command of the 18th Infantry Division in Liegnitz, Silesia, with the rank of Generalleutnant. The transfer meant that Manstein did not receive Beck's post as Chief of the Army General Staff that August (Beck had resigned, despite Manstein's urgings not to do so, as he felt Hitler's intended invasion of Czechoslovakia in October 1938 would be premature). The position was given to General Franz Halder, who had taken Manstein's former post as Deputy Chief of Staff. The incident created a lasting hatred between the two men. On 20 April 1939, Manstein delivered a speech at the celebration of Hitler's 50th birthday, in which he praised Hitler as a leader sent by God to save Germany. He warned the "hostile world" that if it kept erecting "ramparts around Germany to block the way of the German people towards their future", then he would be quite happy to see the world plunged into another world war. Israeli historian Omer Bartov noted in 1999 that the rise of officers such as Manstein was part of a tendency for technocratic officers, usually ardent Nazis, to come to the fore; his opinion was that the Wehrmacht was fully integrated into Nazi Germany, not a separate apolitical organisation independent of the Nazi regime.

== Second World War ==
=== Invasion of Poland ===
On 18 August 1939, in preparation for Fall Weiß (Case White) – the German invasion of Poland – Manstein was appointed Chief of Staff to Gerd von Rundstedt's Army Group South. Here he worked along with Rundstedt's Chief of Operations, Colonel Günther Blumentritt, to develop the operational plan. Rundstedt accepted Manstein's plan calling for the concentration of the majority of the army group's armoured units into Walter von Reichenau's 10th Army, with the objective of a decisive breakthrough which would lead to the encirclement of Polish forces west of the River Vistula. In Manstein's plan, two other armies comprising Army Group South, Wilhelm List's 14th Army, and Johannes Blaskowitz's 8th Army, would provide flank support for Reichenau's armoured thrust towards Warsaw, the Polish capital. Privately, Manstein was lukewarm about the Polish campaign, thinking that it would be better to keep Poland as a buffer between Germany and the Soviet Union. He also worried about an Allied attack from the west once the Polish campaign was underway, which would draw Germany into a two-front war.

Manstein took part in a conference on 22 August 1939 where Hitler underlined to his commanders the need for the physical destruction of Poland as a nation. After the war, he would state in his memoirs that he did not recognise at the time of this meeting that Hitler was going to pursue a policy of extermination against the Poles. He did become aware of the policy later on, as he and other Wehrmacht generals received reports on the activities of the Einsatzgruppen, the Schutzstaffel (SS) death squads tasked with following the army into Poland to murder intellectuals and other civilians. These squads were also assigned to round up Jews and others for relocation to ghettos and Nazi concentration camps. Manstein would later face three charges of war crimes relating to Jewish and civilian deaths in the sectors under his control, and the mistreatment and deaths of prisoners of war.

Launched on 1 September 1939, the invasion began successfully. In Army Group South's area of responsibility under Rundstedt, the 8th, 10th and 14th Armies pursued the retreating Poles. The initial plan was for the 8th Army, the northernmost of the three, to advance towards Łódź. The 10th Army, with its motorised divisions, was to move quickly towards the Vistula, and the 14th Army was to advance and attempt to encircle the Polish troops in the Kraków area. These actions led to the encirclement and defeat of Polish forces in the Radom area on 8–14 September by six German corps. Meanwhile, the German Eighth Army was under attack from the north, so elements of the Fourth, Eighth and Tenth Armies were quickly redeployed with air support in an improvised attempt to cut off any Polish break-out back towards Warsaw. The flexibility and agility of the German forces led to the defeat of nine Polish infantry divisions and other units in the resulting Battle of the Bzura (8–19 September), the largest engagement of the war thus far. The conquest of Poland was quickly over, with the last Polish military units surrendering on 6 October.

=== The Offensive in the West ===
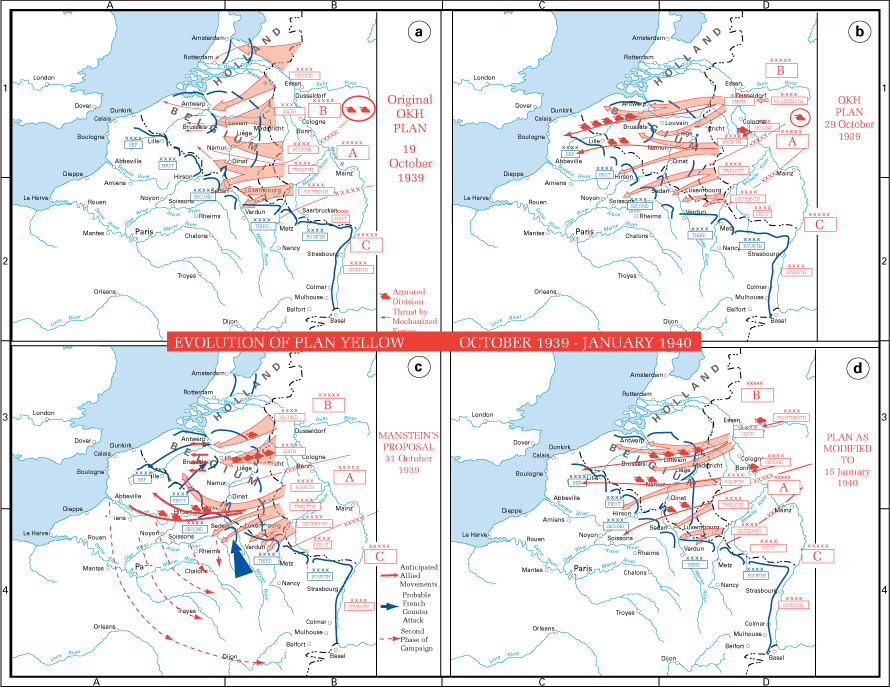
The evolution of German plans for Fall Gelb, the invasion of the Low Countries. The series begins at the upper left corner.

Fall Gelb ("Case Yellow"), the initial plan for the invasion of France, was prepared by Commander-in-Chief of the Army Colonel General (Generaloberst) Walther von Brauchitsch, Halder, and other members of the OKH in early October 1939. Like the Schlieffen Plan of World War I, it called for an encirclement attack through the Netherlands and Belgium. Hitler was not satisfied, so revisions of the plan continued throughout October. Manstein was not satisfied with the plan either, as it focused heavily on the northern wing; he felt an attack from this direction would lack the element of surprise and would expose the German forces to counterattacks from the south. The terrain in Belgium was not well-suited as a base of operations for further attacks on France, so Manstein felt the operation would fail to wipe out the enemy – as it did in the First World War – leading to only partial success and trench warfare. By the end of October Manstein had prepared the outline of a different plan and submitted it to the OKH via his superior, Rundstedt, for whom he was now serving as chief of staff of Army Group A.

Manstein's plan, developed with the informal co-operation of Heinz Guderian, suggested that the Panzer divisions attack through the wooded hills of the Ardennes where no one would expect them, then establish bridgeheads on the Meuse and rapidly drive to the English Channel. The Wehrmacht would thus cut off the French and Allied armies in Belgium and Flanders. This part of the plan later became known as the Sichelschnitt ("sickle cut"). Manstein's proposal also included a second thrust outflanking the Maginot Line, which would allow the Wehrmacht to force any future defensive line much further south.

The OKH originally rejected the proposal; Halder in particular said the plan was entirely without merit. However, on 11 November, Hitler ordered the reallocation of the forces needed to make a surprise thrust in Sedan, thus pushing the plan in the direction that Manstein had suggested. When documents outlining details of Fall Gelb fell into the hands of the Belgians on 10 January 1940, Hitler became even more receptive to change. But Manstein's superiors, Generals Halder and Brauchitsch, resented Manstein's repeated insistence that his plan be implemented in place of theirs. Halder had Manstein removed from Rundstedt's headquarters and sent to Stettin to command the XXXVIII Army Corps on 27 January. Hitler, still looking for a more aggressive plan, approved a modified version of Manstein's ideas, today known as the Manstein Plan, after meeting with him on 17 February. Manstein and his corps played a minor role during the operations in France, serving under Günther von Kluge's 4th Army. His corps helped achieve the first breakthrough east of Amiens during Fall Rot ("Case Red" – the second phase of the invasion plan), and was the first to reach and cross the River Seine. The invasion of France was an outstanding military success; Manstein was promoted to full general and awarded the Knight's Cross of the Iron Cross.

=== Battle of Britain ===
Manstein was a proponent of the prospective German invasion of Great Britain, named Operation Sea Lion. He considered the operation risky but necessary. Early studies by various staff officers determined that air superiority was a prerequisite to the planned invasion. His corps was to be shipped across the English Channel from Boulogne to Bexhill as one of four units assigned to the first wave. But as the Luftwaffe failed to overcome the Royal Air Force during the Battle of Britain, Operation Sea Lion was postponed indefinitely on 12 October. For the rest of the year, Manstein, with little to do, spent time in Paris and at home.

=== Invasion of the Soviet Union ===
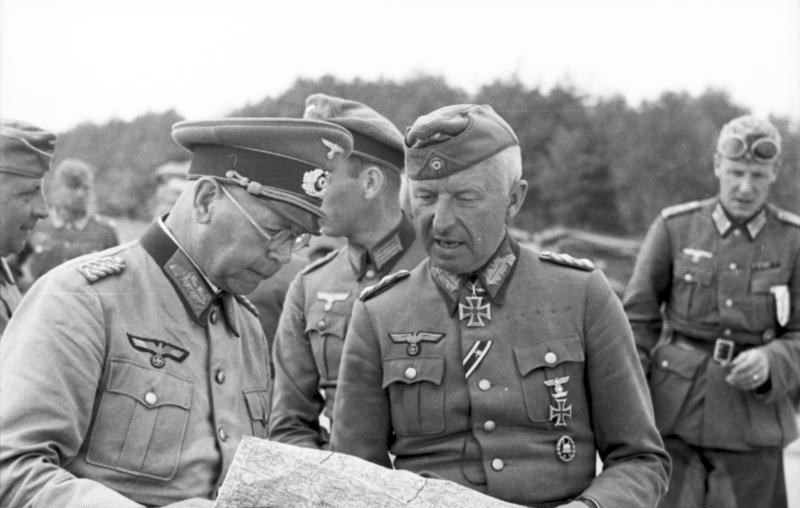
Manstein (right) with General der Panzertruppe Erich Brandenberger, one of his divisional commanders, in June 1941.

In July 1940 the German High Command commenced planning Operation Barbarossa, the invasion of the Soviet Union. On 15 March 1941 Manstein was appointed commander of the LVI Panzer Corps; he was one of 250 commanders to be briefed for the upcoming major offensive, first seeing detailed plans of the offensive in May. His corps was part of the Fourth Panzer Group under the command of General Erich Hoepner in Wilhelm Ritter von Leeb's Army Group North. The Army Group was tasked with thrusting through the Baltic States and then advancing on Leningrad. Manstein arrived at the front only six days prior to the launch of the offensive. Operation Barbarossa commenced on 22 June 1941 with a massive German attack along the whole front line. Manstein's corps was to advance with Georg-Hans Reinhardt's XLI Panzer Corps to the Dvina River to secure the bridges near the town of Daugavpils. The Soviet forces mounted a number of counterattacks, but those were aimed against Reinhardt's corps, leading to the Battle of Raseiniai. Manstein's corps advanced rapidly, reaching the Dvina River, 315 kilometres (196 mi) distant, in just 100 hours. Overextended and well ahead of the rest of the army group, he fended off a number of determined Soviet counterattacks. After Reinhardt's corps closed in, the two corps were tasked with encircling the Soviet formations around Luga in a pincer movement.

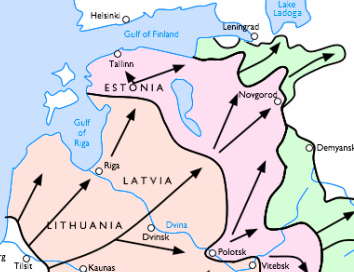
Progress of Army Group North, June to December 1941

Again having penetrated deep into the Soviet lines with unprotected flanks, his corps was the target of a Soviet counteroffensive from 15 July at Soltsy by the Soviet 11th Army, commanded by Nikolai Vatutin. Manstein's 8th Panzer Division was cut off. Although it was able to fight its way free, it was badly mauled, and the Red Army succeeded in halting Manstein's advance at Luga. The corps regrouped at Dno. The 8th Panzer was sent on anti-partisan duties and Manstein was given the 4th SS Polizei Division. The attack on Luga was repeatedly delayed.

The assault on Luga was still underway when Manstein received orders on 10 August that his next task would be to begin the advance toward Leningrad. No sooner had he moved to his new headquarters at Lake Samro than he was told to send his men towards Staraya Russa to relieve the X Corps, which was in danger of being encircled. On 12 August the Red Army had launched an offensive with the 11th and 34th Armies against Army Group North, cutting off three divisions. Frustrated with the loss of the 8th Panzer and the missed opportunity to advance on Leningrad, Manstein returned to Dno. His counteroffensive led to a major Soviet defeat when his unit encircled five Soviet divisions, receiving air support for the first time on that front. They captured 12,000 prisoners and 141 tanks. His opponent, General Kuzma M. Kachanov of the 34th Army, was subsequently court martialed and executed for the defeat. Manstein tried to obtain rest days for his men, who had been constantly fighting in poor terrain and increasingly poor weather since the start of the campaign, but to no avail. They were ordered to advance to the east on Demyansk. On 12 September, when he was near the city, he was informed that he would take over 11th Army of Army Group South in Ukraine.

=== Crimea and the Battle of Sevastopol ===
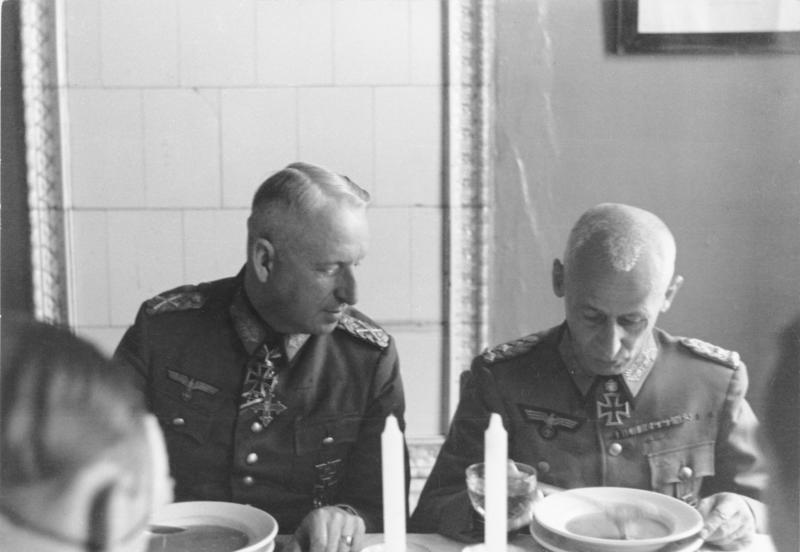
Manstein with Generaloberst Hermann Hoth, commander of the 4th Panzer Army, 1942

In September 1941 Manstein was appointed commander of the 11th Army after its previous commander, Colonel-General Eugen Ritter von Schobert, perished when his plane landed in a Soviet minefield. The 11th Army was tasked with invading the Crimean Peninsula, capturing Sevastopol, and pursuing enemy forces on the flank of Army Group South during its advance into the Soviet Union. Hitler aimed to prevent the Red Army from using airbases in the Crimea and to cut off the Soviet supply of oil from the Caucasus.

Manstein's forces – mostly infantry – achieved a rapid breakthrough during the first days against heavy Soviet resistance. After most of the neck of the Perekop Isthmus had been taken, his forces were substantially reduced, leaving six German divisions and the Romanian Third Army. The rest of the Perekop Isthmus was gradually captured with some difficulty; Manstein complained of a lack of air support to contest Soviet air superiority in the region. He next formed a mobile reconnaissance unit to press down the peninsula, cutting the road between Simferopol and Sevastopol on 31 October 1941. Axis forces captured Simferopol the next day. The 11th Army had captured all of the Crimean Peninsula—except for Sevastopol—by 16 November. Meanwhile, the Red Army had evacuated 300,000 personnel out of the city by sea.

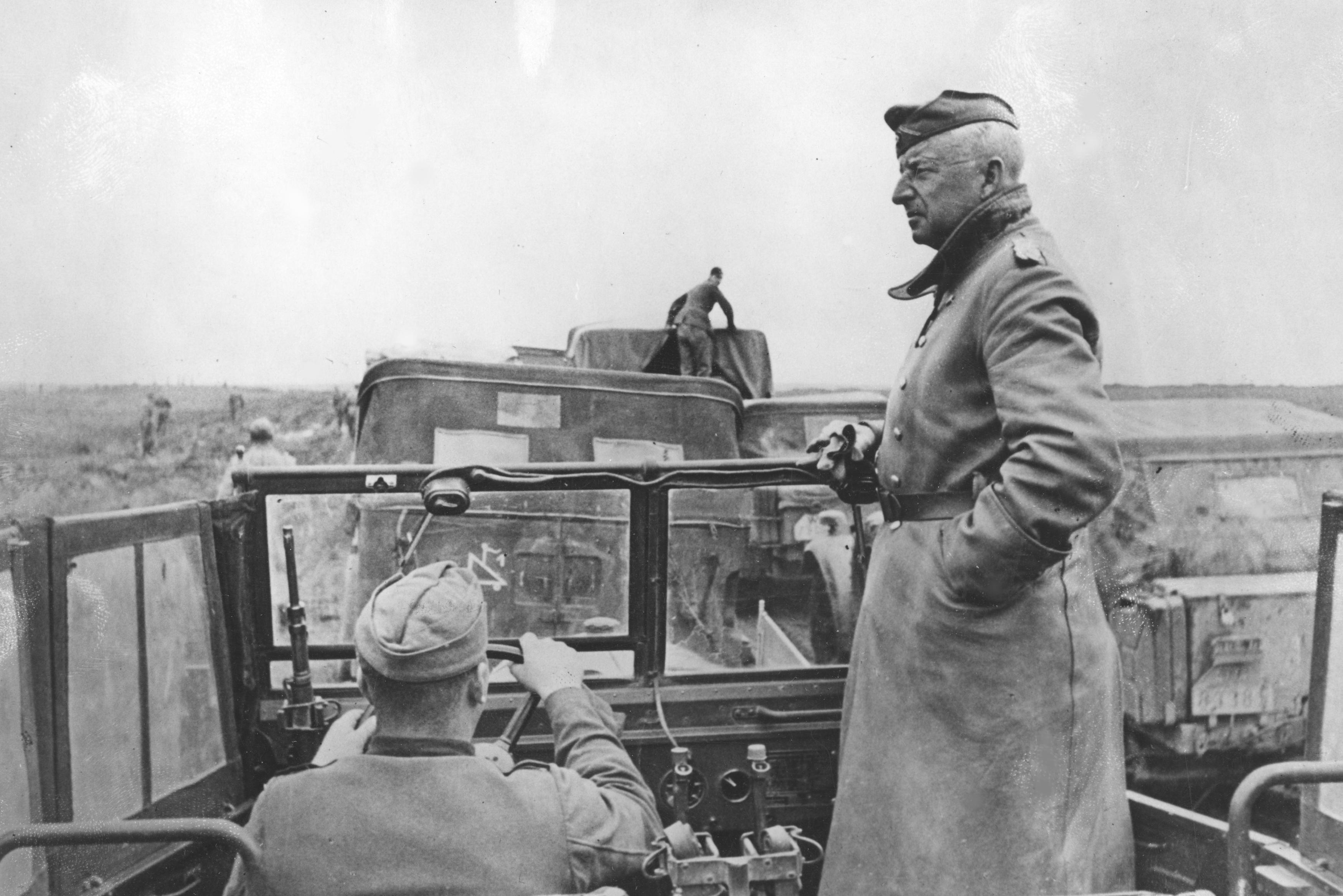
Manstein at the Kerch front, May 1942

Manstein's first attack on Sevastopol in November failed, and with insufficient forces left for an immediate assault, he ordered an investment of the heavily fortified city. By 17 December 1941 he launched another offensive, which also failed. On 26 December Soviet troops landed on the Kerch Straits to retake Kerch and its peninsula, and on 30 December 1941 executed another landing near Feodosiya. Only a hurried withdrawal from the Kerch Peninsula, in contravention of Manstein's orders, by the 46th Infantry Division under General Hans Graf von Sponeck, prevented an Axis collapse in the eastern part of the Crimea; the division lost most of its heavy equipment. Manstein cancelled a planned resumption of the attack and sent most of his forces east to destroy the Soviet bridgehead. The Soviet forces were in a superior position regarding men and materiel as they were able to re-supply by sea; accordingly, Stalin pushed them to conduct further offensives. However, the Soviet troops were unable to capture the critical rail- and road-access points which would have cut the German lines of supply.

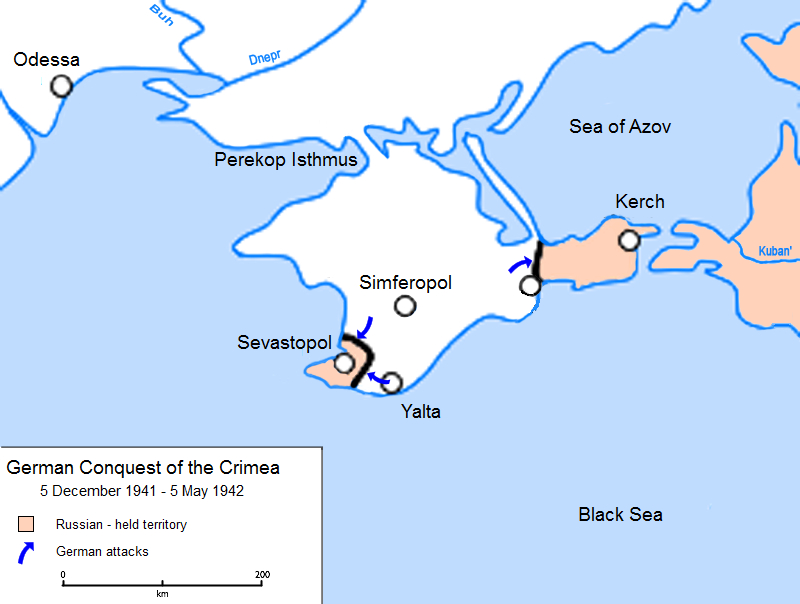
Map shows progress as of 5 May 1942

For the Battle of the Kerch Peninsula, launched on 8 May 1942, Hitler finally assigned Manstein major air support. The 11th Army was outnumbered on the ground, so Manstein had them feint an attack in the north while the bulk of the force attacked to the south. The Soviet troops soon fled. Manstein recorded in his memoirs the capture of "170,000 prisoners, 1,133 guns and 258 tanks". Kerch was captured on 16 May. The Wehrmacht lost only 8,000 men.

After a month's delay, Manstein turned his attention once more to the capture of Sevastopol, a battle in which Germany used some of the largest guns ever built. Along with large numbers of regular artillery pieces, super-heavy 600 mm (24 in) Karl-Gerät mortars and the 800 mm (31 in) "Dora" railway gun were brought in for the assault. A furious barrage began on the morning of 2 June 1942. All of the resources of the Luftwaffe's Luftflotte 4, commanded by Wolfram von Richthofen, were committed; the barrage continued for five days before the ground assault began.

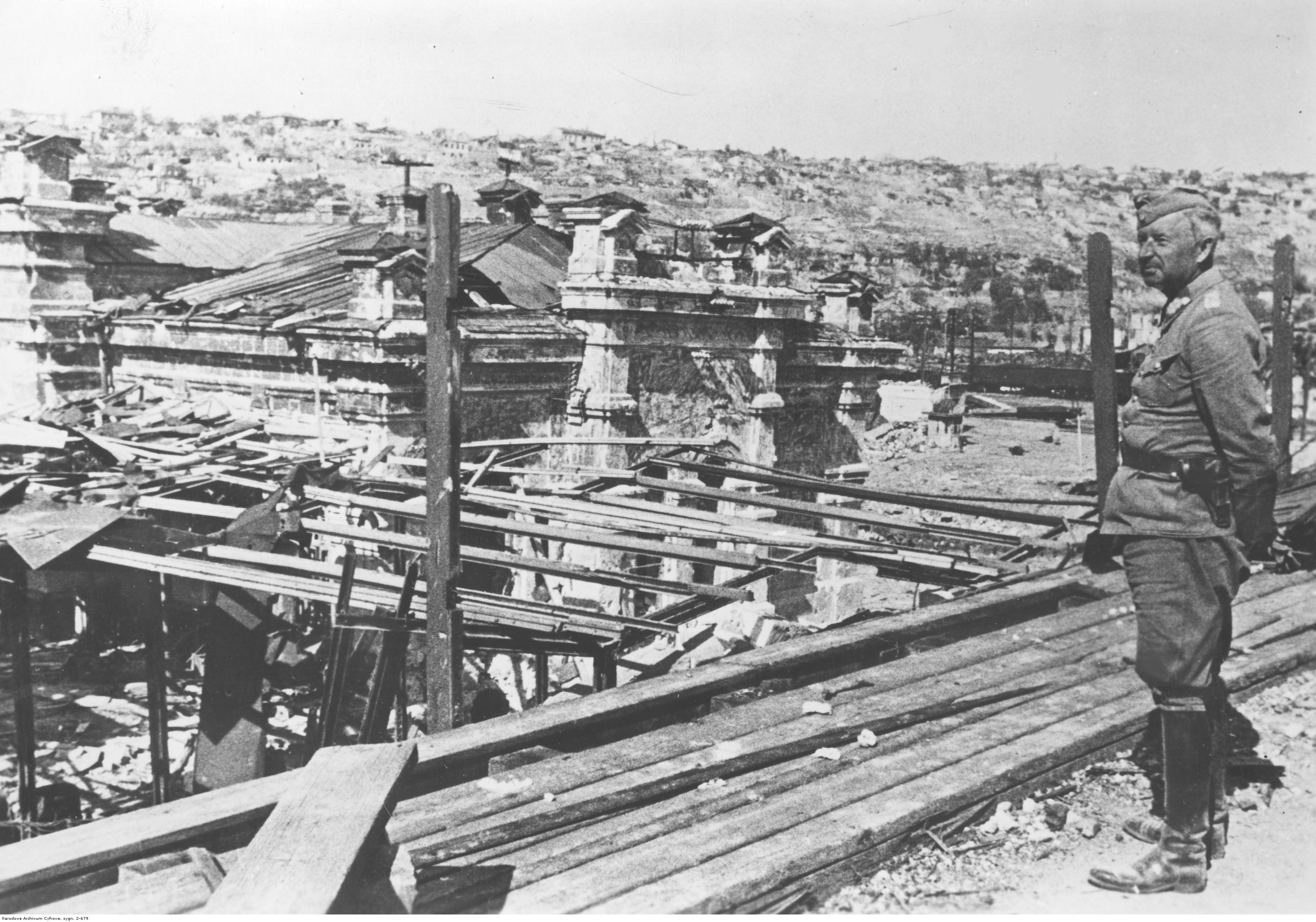
Manstein observing the ruins of Sevastopol, July 1942

The 11th Army gained ground during mid-June, focusing their attention on the northern approaches to the city. Casualties were high on both sides as the month dragged on. Aware of the need to act before the German offensive of 1942 reduced the availability of reinforcements and supplies, Manstein ordered a surprise attack across Severnaya Bay using amphibious landings on 29 June 1942. The operation was a success; Soviet resistance crumbled. On 1 July 1942 German forces entered the city while the Soviet forces conducted a disorganised evacuation, and Hitler promoted Manstein to Generalfeldmarschall the same day. The entire city was in German hands by 4 July 1942.

During the Crimean campaign, Manstein and his troops often relied on either direct or indirect support from their Romanian allies. While the Romanian troops did not play a decisive role, their secondary assaults freed up German units for other attacks. During this time, Manstein grew close to Marshal Ion Antonescu, Romania's wartime leader. Manstein and his wife spent several weeks of leave in July and August 1942 as house guests of the Antonescus.

In Crimea, Manstein was indirectly involved in atrocities against the Soviet population, especially those committed by Einsatzgruppe D, one of several Schutzstaffel (SS) groups that had been tasked with the elimination of the Jews of Europe. Einsatzgruppe D travelled in the wake of Manstein's 11th Army and were provided by Manstein's command with vehicles, fuel, and drivers. Military police cordoned off areas where the Einsatzgruppe planned to shoot Jews to prevent anyone from escaping. Captain Ulrich Gunzert, shocked to have witnessed Einsatzgruppe D massacre a group of Jewish women and children, asked Manstein to do something to stop the murders. Gunzert states that Manstein told him to forget what he had seen and to concentrate on fighting the Red Army. Eleven of the seventeen charges against Manstein at his later war crimes trial related to Nazi maltreatment and murder of Jews and prisoners of war in Crimea.

=== Siege of Leningrad ===
After the capture of Sevastopol, Hitler felt Manstein was the right man to command the forces at Leningrad, which had been under siege since September 1941. With elements of the 11th Army, Manstein was transferred to the Leningrad front, arriving on 27 August 1942. Manstein again lacked the proper forces to storm the city, so he planned Operation Nordlicht, a bold plan for a thrust to cut off Leningrad's supply line at Lake Ladoga.

However, on the day of his arrival, the Red Army launched the Sinyavin Offensive. Originally planned as a spoiling attack against Georg Lindemann's 18th Army in the narrow German salient west of Lake Ladoga, the offensive appeared able to break through the German lines, lifting the siege. Hitler, bypassing the usual chain of command, telephoned Manstein directly and ordered him to take offensive action in the area. After a series of heavy battles, he launched a counterattack on 21 September 1942 that cut off the two Soviet armies in the salient. Fighting continued throughout October 1942. Although the Soviet offensive was fended off, the resulting attrition meant that the Wehrmacht could no longer execute a decisive assault on Leningrad, and Nordlicht was put on hold. The siege was finally lifted by the Soviet forces in January 1944.

=== Battle of Stalingrad ===
The Soviet counterattack at Stalingrad German front, 19 November German front, 12 December German front, 24 December Russian advance, 19–28 November

In an attempt to resolve their persistent shortage of oil, the Wehrmacht had launched Fall Blau (Case Blue), a massive offensive aimed against the Caucasian oilfields, in 1942. After German air attacks, the 6th Army, led by Friedrich Paulus, was tasked with capturing Stalingrad, a key city on the River Volga. His troops, supported by 4th Panzer Army, entered the city on 12 September. Hand-to-hand combat and street fighting ensued. The Red Army launched a huge counteroffensive on 19 November, codenamed Operation Uranus, which was designed to encircle the German armies and trap them in the city; this goal was accomplished on 23 November. Hitler, aware that if Stalingrad were lost it would likely never be retaken, appointed Manstein as commander of the newly created Army Group Don (Heeresgruppe Don), tasked with mounting a relief operation named Unternehmen Wintergewitter (Operation Winter Storm), to reinforce the German hold on the city. Manstein's initial assessment on 24 November was that the 6th Army, given adequate air support, would be able to hold on.

In October 1942, his son, Gero, was killed in battle. He later described this as "The worst thing that happened to me personally during the war".

Launched on 12 December, Winter Storm achieved some initial success. Manstein's three Panzer divisions (comprising the 23rd, 6th, and 17th Panzer Divisions) and supporting units of the LVII Panzer Corps advanced to within 48 km (30 mi) of Stalingrad by 20 December at the Myshkova River, where they came under assault by Soviet tanks in blizzard conditions. Manstein made a request to Hitler on 18 December that 6th Army should attempt to break out. Hitler was against it, and both Manstein and Paulus were reluctant to openly disobey his orders. Conditions deteriorated inside the city; the men suffered from lice, the cold weather, and inadequate supplies of food and ammunition. Reichsminister of Aviation Hermann Göring had assured Hitler that the trapped 6th Army could be adequately supplied by air, but due to poor weather, a lack of aircraft, and mechanical difficulties, this turned out not to be the case. On 24 January, Manstein urged Hitler to allow Paulus to surrender, but he refused. In spite of Hitler's wishes, Paulus surrendered with his remaining 91,000 soldiers on 31 January 1943. Some 200,000 German and Romanian soldiers died; of those who surrendered, only 6,000 survivors returned to Germany after the end of the war. Manstein believed he had done his best for the 6th Army. The encircled men saw it differently:

His weakness was that he didn't take a stronger stance against Hitler. One can resign. Or accept the death sentence. If you are totally convinced, and he was, that it was wrong to keep the army in Stalingrad.

— Winrich Behr

American historians Williamson Murray and Allan Millett wrote that Manstein's message to Hitler on 24 November advising him that the 6th Army should not break out, along with Göring's statements that the Luftwaffe could supply Stalingrad, "... sealed the fate of Sixth Army". Historians, including Gerhard Weinberg, have pointed out that Manstein's version of the events at Stalingrad in his memoir is distorted and several events described there were probably made up. "Because of the sensitivity of the Stalingrad question in post-war Germany, Manstein worked as hard to distort the record on this matter as on his massive involvement in the murder of Jews", wrote Weinberg.

Meanwhile, the Red Army launched an offensive of their own. Operation Saturn was intended to capture Rostov and thus cut off the German Army Group A. However, after the launch of Winter Storm, the Soviet army had to reallocate forces to prevent the relief of Stalingrad, so the operation was scaled down and redubbed "Little Saturn". The offensive forced Manstein to divert forces to avoid the collapse of the entire front. The attack also prevented the XLVIII Panzer Corps (comprising the 336th Infantry Division, the 3rd Luftwaffe Field Division, and the 11th Panzer Division), under the command of General Otto von Knobelsdorff, from joining up with the LVII Panzer Corps as planned to aid the relief effort. Instead, the XLVIII Panzer Corps held a line along the Chir River, beating off successive Soviet attacks. General Hermann Balck used the 11th Panzer Division to counterattack Soviet salients. On the verge of collapse, the German units were able to hold the line, but the Italian 8th Army on the flanks was overwhelmed and subsequently destroyed.

Spurred on by this success, the Red Army planned a series of follow-up offensives in January and February 1943 intended to decisively beat the German forces in southern Russia. After the destruction of the remaining Hungarian and Italian forces during the Ostrogozhsk–Rossosh Offensive, Operation Star and Operation Gallop were launched to recapture Kharkov and Kursk and to cut off all German forces east of Donetsk. Those operations succeeded in breaking through the German lines and threatened the whole southern part of the German front. To deal with this threat, Army Group Don, Army Group B, and parts of Army Group A were united as Army Group South (Heeresgruppe Süd) under Manstein's command in early February.

=== Kharkov counter-offensive ===
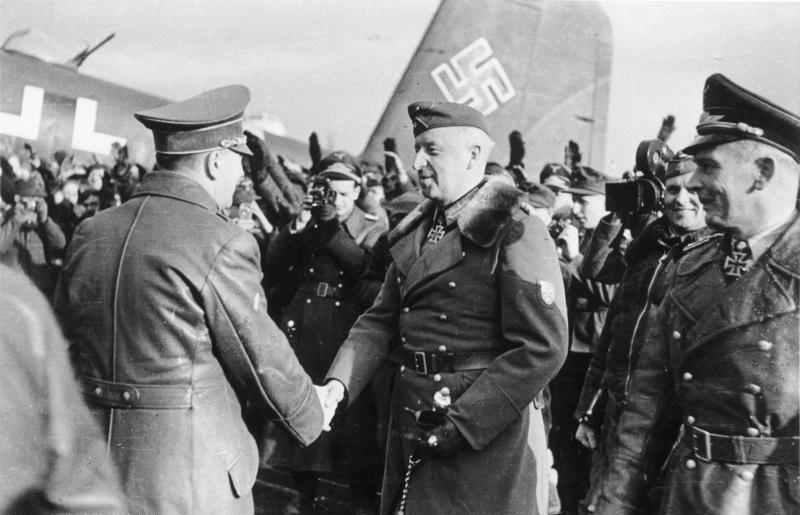
On 10 March 1943, under heavy security, Hitler flew to Army Group South's headquarters at Zaporozh'ye, Ukraine, only 48 km (30 mi) from the front lines, to review the military situation. Manstein greets Hitler upon his arrival at the local airfield; on the right are Hans Baur and the Luftwaffe Generalfeldmarschall Wolfram von Richthofen.

During their offensives in February 1943, the Red Army broke through the German lines, retaking Kursk on 9 February. As Army Groups B and Don were in danger of being surrounded, Manstein repeatedly called for reinforcements. Although Hitler called on 13 February for Kharkov to be held "at all costs", SS-Oberst-Gruppenführer Paul Hausser, commander of the II SS Panzer Corps, ordered the city evacuated on 15 February. Hitler arrived at the front in person on 17 February, and over the course of three days of exhausting meetings, Manstein convinced him that offensive action was needed in the area to regain the initiative and prevent encirclement. Troops were reorganised and reinforcements were pulled into the zone from neighbouring armies. Manstein immediately began planning a counteroffensive, launched on 20 February, that later became known as the "backhand blow"; Vatutin and the Soviet forces, believing that Manstein would retreat, were taken completely by surprise. By 2 March, the Wehrmacht had captured 615 tanks and had killed some 23,000 Soviet soldiers.

To reinforce the point that the recapture of Kharkov was important politically, Hitler travelled again to the front lines in Ukraine on 10 March 1943 where he met with Manstein to review the situation. Manstein carefully assembled his available forces along a wide front to prevent their encirclement and the Germans recaptured Kharkov on 14 March, after bloody street fighting in the Third Battle of Kharkov. For this accomplishment, he received the Oak Leaves for the Knight's Cross. Hausser's II SS Panzer Corps captured Belgorod on 18 March. Manstein's counteroffensive had not only prevented the disintegration of the entire front, it had regained substantial territory and resulted in the destruction of three Soviet armies and the retreat of three others. Soviet casualties for the preceding month in that sector had been 46,000 dead and 14,000 taken prisoner. Captured or destroyed were 600 tanks and 1,200 pieces of artillery. The spring thaw began by 23 March, ending operations in the area for the time being. Planning was then undertaken to eliminate the enemy salient at Kursk.

=== Operation Citadel ===
Manstein favoured an immediate pincer attack on the Kursk salient after the battle at Kharkov, but Hitler was concerned that such a plan would draw forces away from the industrial region in the Donets Basin. In any event, the ground was still too muddy to move the tanks into position. In lieu of an immediate attack, the OKH prepared Operation Citadel, the launching of which would be delayed while more troops were gathered in the area and the mud solidified. Meanwhile, the Red Army, well aware of the danger of encirclement, also moved in large numbers of reinforcements, and their intelligence reports revealed the expected locations and timing of the German thrusts.

Battle of Kursk: southern pincer

Citadel was the last German strategic offensive on the Eastern Front, and one of the largest battles in history, involving more than four million men. By the time the Wehrmacht launched their initial assault on 5 July 1943, the Soviet forces outnumbered them by nearly three to one. Walter Model was in command of the northern pincer, with the Ninth Army, while Manstein's Army Group South formed the southern pincer.

Both armies were slowed as the tanks were blown up in minefields and caught up in combat on a series of prepared Soviet defensive lines. After five days of fighting Model's advance was stopped, with the Ninth Panzers suffering 25,000 casualties. By 13 July Model's forces were being drawn away towards Orel, where the Soviet army had launched Operation Kutuzov. Manstein's forces were able to penetrate the Soviet lines, causing heavy casualties. He reached, but did not enter or capture, Prokhorovka, his first major objective, on 11 July, inflicting serious Soviet losses in the resulting Battle of Prokhorovka.

However, on 13 July Hitler called off the failed Kursk offensive; the Allies had landed in Sicily, so he issued the order for a withdrawal. Manstein protested; he felt that the Soviet forces had exhausted all their reserves in the area, and he did not want to stop until all his own reserves had been committed. Hitler, however, insisted on calling off the operation. Although Soviet casualties were indeed heavy, modern historians discount the possibility of a successful German continuation of the offensive.

=== Retreat to the Dnieper ===
Manstein regarded the Battle of Kursk as something of a German victory, as he believed that he had destroyed much of the Red Army's offensive capacity for the rest of 1943. This assessment turned out to be incorrect, as the Red Army was able to recover much faster than Manstein expected. Manstein moved his panzer reserves to the Mius River and the lower Dnieper, not realising the Soviet activities there were a diversion. A Soviet offensive that began on 3 August put Army Group South under heavy pressure. After two days of heavy fighting, the Soviet troops broke through the German lines and retook Belgorod, punching a 56 km (35 mi) wide hole between the Fourth Panzer Army and the Army Detachment Kempf, tasked with holding Kharkov. In response to Manstein's demands for reinforcements, Hitler sent the Großdeutschland, 7th Panzer, SS 2nd Das Reich, and SS 3rd Totenkopf Divisions.

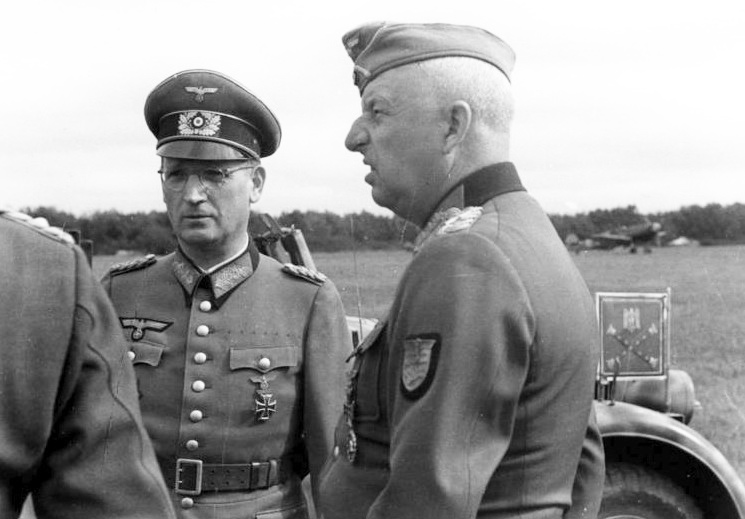
Manstein (right) with Generalmajor Hans Speidel on the Dnieper, September 1943

Construction began of defensive positions along the Dnieper, but Hitler refused requests to pull back, insisting that Kharkov be held. With reinforcements trickling in, Manstein waged a series of counterattacks and armoured battles near Bohodukhiv and Okhtyrka between 13 and 17 August, which resulted in heavy casualties as they ran into prepared Soviet lines. On 20 August he informed the OKH that his forces in the Donets river area were holding a too-wide front with insufficient numbers, and that he needed to either withdraw to the Dnieper River or receive reinforcements. Continuous pressure from the Soviet forces had separated Army Group Centre from Army Group South and severely threatened Manstein's northern flank. When the Red Army threw their main reserves behind a drive to retake Kharkov on 21–22 August, Manstein took advantage of this to close the gap between the 4th Panzer and 8th Armies and reestablish a defensive line. Hitler finally allowed Manstein to withdraw back across the Dnieper on 15 September. During the withdrawal, Manstein ordered scorched earth actions to be taken in a zone 20 to 30 kilometres (12 to 19 mi) from the river, and later faced charges at his war crimes trial for issuing this order. Soviet losses in July and August included over 1.6 million casualties, 10,000 tanks and self-propelled artillery pieces, and 4,200 aircraft. German losses, while only one-tenth that of the Soviet losses, were much more difficult to sustain, as there were no further reserves of men and materiel to draw on. In a series of four meetings that September, Manstein tried unsuccessfully to convince Hitler to reorganise the high command and let his generals make more of the military decisions.

=== Battle of the Dnieper ===
In September 1943 Manstein withdrew to the west bank of the Dnieper in an operation that for the most part was well-ordered, but at times degenerated into a disorganised rout as his exhausted soldiers became "unglued". Hundreds of thousands of Soviet civilians travelled west with them, many bringing livestock and personal property. Manstein correctly deduced that the next Soviet attack would be towards Kiev, but as had been the case throughout the campaign, the Red Army used maskirovka (deception) to disguise the timing and exact location of their intended offensive. Historians Williamson Murray and Allan Reed Millett wrote that many German generals' "fanatical belief" in Nazi racial theories " ... made the idea that Slavs could manipulate German intelligence with such consistency utterly inconceivable". The 1st Ukrainian Front, led by Nikolai Fyodorovich Vatutin, met the outnumbered Fourth Panzer Army near Kiev. Vatutin first made a thrust near Liutezh, just north of Kiev, and then attacked near Bukrin, to the south, on 1 November. The German troops, thinking Bukrin would be the location of the main attack, were taken completely by surprise when Vatutin captured the bridgehead at Liutezh and gained a foothold on the west bank of the Dnieper. Kiev was liberated on 6 November. The 17th Army was cut off and isolated in the Crimea by the attacking 4th Ukrainian Front on 28 October.

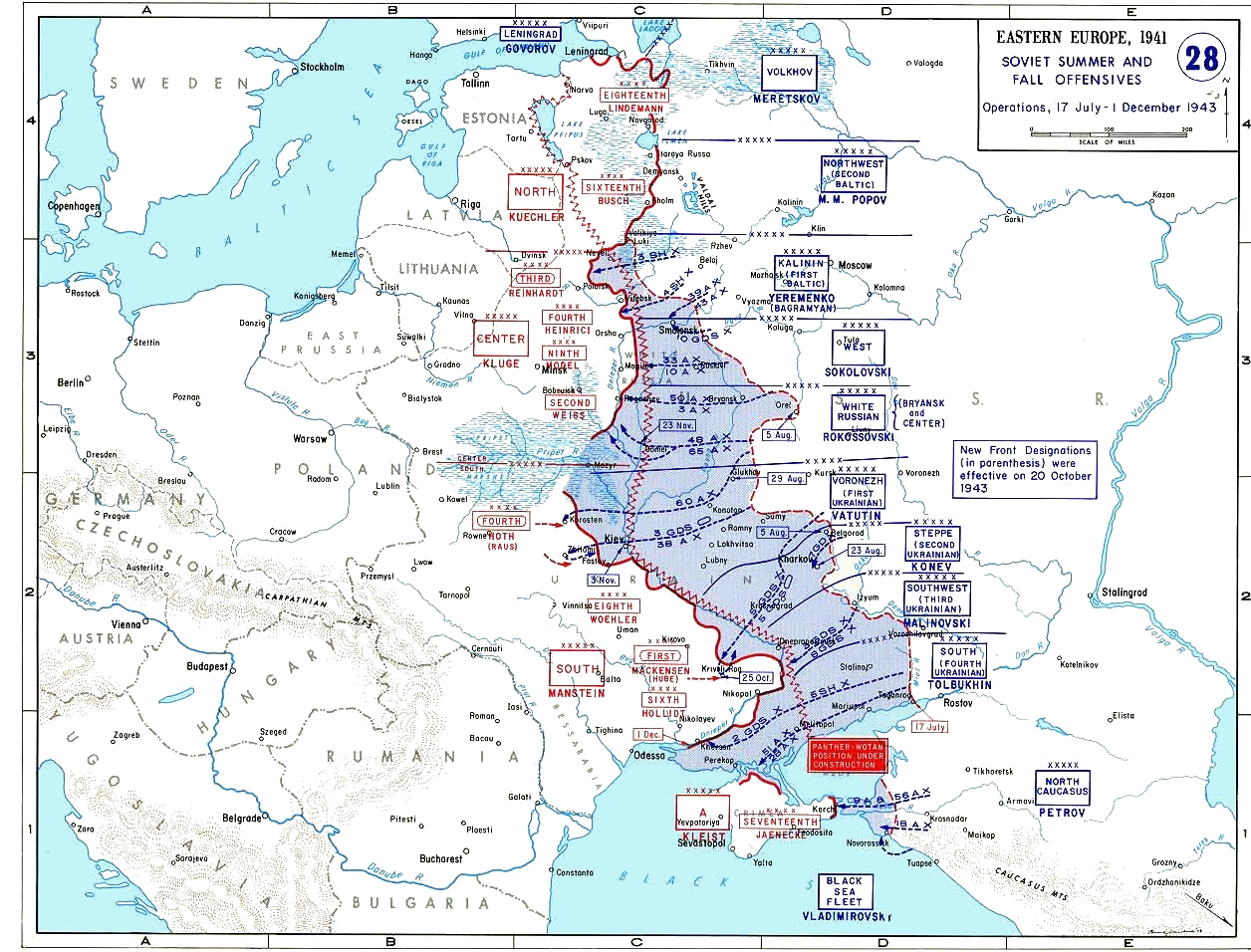
Operations along the Dnieper, July to December 1943

Under the guidance of General Hermann Balck, the cities of Zhytomyr and Korosten were retaken in mid-November, but after receiving reinforcements Vatutin resumed the offensive on 24 December 1943, and the Red Army continued its successful advance. Manstein's repeated requests to Hitler for more reinforcements were turned down. On 4 January 1944 Manstein met with Hitler to tell him that the Dnieper line was untenable and that he needed to retreat to save his forces. Hitler refused, and Manstein again requested changes in the highest levels of the military leadership, but was turned down, as Hitler believed that he alone was capable of managing the wider strategy.

In January Manstein was forced to retreat further west by the Soviet offensive. Without waiting for permission from Hitler, he ordered the German XI and XXXXII Corps (consisting of 56,000 men in six divisions) of Army Group South to break out of the Korsun Pocket during the night of 16–17 February 1944. By the beginning of March, the Soviet forces had driven the Wehrmacht well back of the river. Because of Hitler's directive of 19 March that from that point forward all positions were to be defended to the last man, Manstein's 1st Panzer Army became encircled in the Kamenets-Podolsky pocket at the end of March when permission to break out was not received from Hitler in time. Manstein flew to Hitler's headquarters in Lvov to try to convince him to change his mind. Hitler eventually relented, but relieved Manstein of his command on 30 March 1944.

Manstein appeared on the cover of the 10 January 1944 issue of Time magazine, above the caption "Retreat may be masterly, but victory is in the opposite direction".

=== Dismissal ===
Manstein received the Swords of the Knight's Cross on 30 March 1944 and handed over control of Army Group South to Model on 2 April during a meeting at Hitler's mountain retreat, the Berghof. Model's adjutant, Günther Reichhelm, later described the scene and Manstein's response:

He must have paid him compliments about his strategic skills during the attack operations, but he also said, "I cannot use you in the South. Field Marshal Model will take over." And Manstein replied, "My Führer ... please believe me when I say I will use all strategic means at my disposal to defend the soil in which my son lies buried."

While on medical leave after surgery to remove a cataract in his right eye, Manstein recovered at home in Liegnitz and in a medical facility in Dresden. He suffered from an infection and for a time was in danger of losing his sight. On the day of the failed 20 July plot, an assassination attempt on Hitler's life that was part of a planned military coup d'état, Manstein was at a seaside resort on the Baltic. Although he had met at various times with three of the main conspirators – Claus von Stauffenberg, Henning von Tresckow, and Rudolf-Christoph von Gersdorff – Manstein was not involved in the conspiracy; he later said "Preussische Feldmarschälle meutern nicht"—"Prussian field marshals do not mutiny." Still, the Gestapo placed Manstein's house under surveillance.

When it became obvious that Hitler was not going to appoint him to a new post, Manstein bought an estate in East Pomerania in October 1944, but he was soon forced to abandon it when Soviet forces overran the area. His home at Liegnitz had to be evacuated on 22 January 1945, and he and his family took refuge temporarily with friends in Berlin. While there, Manstein tried to get an audience with Hitler in the Führerbunker but was turned away. He and his family continued to move farther west into Germany until the war in Europe ended with a German defeat in May 1945. Manstein suffered further complications in his right eye and was receiving treatment in a hospital in Heiligenhafen when he was arrested by the British and transferred to a prisoner of war camp near Lüneburg on 26 August.

== Post-war ==
=== Trial and conviction ===
Manstein was moved to Nuremberg in October 1945. He was held at the Palace of Justice, the location of the Nuremberg trials of major Nazi war criminals and organisations. While there, Manstein helped prepare a 132-page document for the defence of the General Staff and the OKW, on trial at Nuremberg in August 1946. The myth that the Wehrmacht was "clean" – not culpable for the events of the Holocaust – arose partly as a result of this document, written largely by Manstein, along with General of Cavalry Siegfried Westphal. He also gave oral testimony about the Einsatzgruppen, the treatment of prisoners of war, and the concept of military obedience, especially as related to the Commissar Order, an order issued by Hitler in 1941, requiring all Soviet political commissars to be shot without trial. Manstein admitted that he received the order, but said he did not carry it out.

Documents from 1941 presented at Nuremberg and at Manstein's own later trial contradict this claim: He actually received regular reports throughout that period regarding the execution of hundreds of political commissars. He denied any knowledge of the activities of the Einsatzgruppen, and testified that soldiers under his command were not involved in the murder of Jewish civilians. Otto Ohlendorf, commander of Einsatzgruppe D, contradicted this during his testimony, saying that not only was Manstein aware of what was happening but that the Eleventh Army was involved. In September 1946, the General Staff and the OKW were declared to not be a criminal organisation. Their decision was that a collection of military officers was not a group or organisation as defined by article 9 of their charter.

After his testimony at Nuremberg, Manstein was interned by the British as a prisoner of war at Island Farm (also known as Special Camp 11) in Bridgend, Wales, where he awaited the decision as to whether or not he would face a war crimes trial. He mostly kept apart from the other inmates, taking solitary walks, tending a small garden, and beginning work on the drafts of two books. British author B. H. Liddell Hart was in correspondence with Manstein and others at Island Farm and visited inmates of several camps around Britain while preparing his best-selling 1947 book On the Other Side of the Hill. Liddell Hart was an admirer of the German generals; he described Manstein as an operational genius. The two remained in contact, and Liddell Hart later helped Manstein arrange the publication of the English edition of his memoir, Verlorene Siege (Lost Victories), in 1958.

The British cabinet, under pressure from the Soviet Union, finally decided in July 1948 to prosecute Manstein for war crimes. He and three other senior officers (Walther von Brauchitsch, Gerd von Rundstedt and Adolf Strauss) were transferred to Munsterlager to await trial. Brauchitsch died that October and Rundstedt and Strauss were released on medical grounds in March 1949. Manstein's trial was held in Hamburg from 23 August to 19 December 1949.

Manstein faced seventeen charges at the trial, three of which pertained to events in Poland and fourteen regarding events in the Soviet Union. Charges included maltreatment of prisoners of war, co-operation with the Einsatzgruppe D in murdering Jewish residents of the Crimea, and disregarding the welfare of civilians by using "scorched earth" tactics while retreating from the Soviet Union. The prosecution, led by senior counsel Arthur Comyns Carr, used an order Manstein had signed on 20 November 1941, based on the Severity Order that had been issued by Field Marshal Walther von Reichenau, to build their case that Manstein had known about and was complicit with the genocide. The order called for the elimination of the "Jewish Bolshevik system" and the "harsh punishment of Jewry".

Manstein claimed that he remembered asking for a draft of such an order but had no recollection of signing it. American historians Ronald Smelser and Edward J. Davies wrote in 2008 that Manstein agreed with Hitler's idea that the war against the Soviet Union was a war to exterminate Judeo-Bolshevism and that he committed perjury when he claimed not to remember signing his version of the Severity Order.

Manstein's defence, led by the lawyer Reginald Thomas Paget, argued that the order was justified because many partisans were Jews, and therefore Manstein's order calling for all Jews to be executed was justified by his desire to protect his men from partisan attacks. He argued that Manstein was not compelled to disobey orders given by his sovereign government, even if such orders were illegal. Manstein, speaking in his defence, stated that he found the Nazi racial policy to be repugnant. Sixteen other witnesses testified that Manstein had no knowledge of or involvement in genocide. Paget called the Soviets "savages", arguing that Manstein showed restraint as a "decent German soldier" in upholding the laws of war when fighting against the Soviets, who displayed "appalling savagery".

Whether or not Manstein was responsible for the activities of Einsatzgruppe D, a unit not under his direct control but operating in his zone of command, became one of the key points of the trial. The prosecution claimed it was Manstein's duty to know about the activities of this unit and also his duty to put a stop to their genocidal operations. Recent scholars, including Ronald Smelser and Benoît Lemay, are of the opinion that he almost certainly perjured himself at his trial and at Nuremberg.

Manstein was found guilty on nine of the charges and was sentenced to eighteen years in prison. The charges for which he was found guilty included shooting Soviet war prisoners; carrying out the Commissar Order; and allowing subordinates to shoot civilians. Manstein's supporters in Britain and in Germany protested. Liddell Hart lobbied in the British press, and in Germany the sentence was seen as a political decision. The sentence was reduced to 12 years in February 1950. Paget published a best-selling book in 1951 about Manstein's career and trial which portrayed Manstein as an honourable soldier fighting heroically despite overwhelming odds on the Eastern Front and who had been convicted of crimes that he did not commit. The book helped to contribute to the growing cult surrounding Manstein's name. His release on 7 May 1953 was partly a result of a recurrence of his eye problems but also the result of pressure by Winston Churchill, Konrad Adenauer, Liddell Hart, Paget, and others. Also, the British wanted Germany to take part in the defence of Western Europe, and Adenauer made Germany's re-armament contingent on the release of their war criminals.

=== Antisemitism ===
Manstein believed that Bolshevism and Jews were inextricably linked, that there was a global conspiracy led by the Jews, and that to stop the spread of communism it was necessary to remove the Jews from European society. His order of 20 November 1941, based on the Severity Order of Reichenau, reads in part:

[The] Jewish Bolshevik system must be wiped out once and for all and should never again be allowed to invade our European living space ... It is the same Jewish class of beings who have done so much damage to our own Fatherland by virtue of their activities against the nation and civilisation, and who promote anti-German tendencies throughout the world, and who will be the harbingers of revenge. Their extermination is a dictate of our own survival.

Manstein did nothing to prevent the murder of Jews and other civilians in the areas where his units were operating, and in which his Eleventh Army actively participated. That Manstein was well aware of the Einsatzgruppen massacres is demonstrated by a 1941 letter he sent to Otto Ohlendorf, in which Manstein demands Ohlendorf hand over the wristwatches of murdered Jews. Manstein felt his men deserved the watches, since they were doing so much to help Ohlendorf's men with their work. Smelser and Davies note that this letter was the only time that Manstein ever complained about the activities of the Einsatzgruppen. Manstein later stated that he felt the number of Jews murdered in the Holocaust was exaggerated.

Antisemitism was common in Germany and throughout Europe during this period, and Manstein's attitude towards the Jews had its roots in his exposure to and assimilation of these views. Biographer Benoît Lemay describes Manstein's actions as a reflection of his loyalty toward Hitler and the Nazi regime and of his grounding in a sense of duty based on traditional Prussian military values.

His criticism of Hitler was based solely on their disagreements over the conduct of the war, not about the regime's racial policies. Some historians, including Antony Beevor and Benoît Lemay, are of the opinion that Manstein had some Jewish ancestry. However, Manstein was the only Reichswehr officer who opposed the introduction of the Aryan paragraph in 1934. He sent a letter of protest to General Beck, commenting that anyone who had volunteered to serve in the armed forces had already proven their worth.

Lemay speculated that Manstein may have been interested in protecting his two Mischlinge grandnephews who were already serving in the Reichswehr. He may have also been concerned about the possibility that he had distant Jewish ancestry. The SS carried out an investigation into Manstein's ancestry but the report was not completed and the results remain unknown.

=== Post-war life and memoirs ===
Along with ten other former senior officers, Manstein was called on in 1955 by the Amt Blank to formulate plans for the re-founding of the German army. On 20 June 1953, he spoke to the Bundestag, giving his analysis of strategic power considerations and the country's defence and spoke about whether the country should have a professional army or a conscripted army. His opinion was that the length of service for Bundeswehr conscripts should be at least 18 months, preferably 24 months. His idea to form a reserve force was later implemented.

Manstein's war memoir, Verlorene Siege (Lost Victories), was published in West Germany in 1955 and was later translated into several other languages. The book was a highly acclaimed best-seller, critical of Hitler and his leadership style. Historians such as Liddell Hart saw Manstein's emphasis on the purely military aspects of the war, while ignoring the political and moral aspects, as a way for him to absolve himself and the high command of any responsibility for the events of the Holocaust. Over the years, he became the centre of a "military cult" which cast him not only as one of Germany's greatest generals, but also one of the greatest in history. He has been described as a militärische Kult- und Leitfigur ("military cult figure and leading personality"), a general of legendary – almost mythical – ability, much honoured by both the public and historians. Biographers, including Benoît Lemay, feel that his narrow focus on military matters to the exclusion of moral issues cannot be considered ethical.

Manstein and his wife moved several times after his release from prison, living in Essen and Bonn for a time before settling into a house near Munich in 1958. The second volume of his memoirs, Aus einem Soldatenleben ("A Soldier's Life"), covering the period from 1887 to 1939, was published in 1958. His wife, Jutta Sibylle von Manstein, died in 1966.

On Manstein's 80th birthday, he received congratulations from the Bundeswehr's supreme high commander, General Ulrich de Maizière, with entourage.

Erich von Manstein died of a stroke on 10 June 1973 at the age of 85. As the penultimate surviving German field marshal (Ferdinand Schörner died 2 July 1973), he was buried with full military honours. His funeral was attended by hundreds of soldiers of all ranks. In Manstein's obituary, Spiegel magazine said, "He assisted in the march to catastrophe—misled by a blind sense of duty."

== Awards ==
- Iron Cross of 1914, 1st and 2nd class
- Knight's Cross of the Royal House Order of Hohenzollern with Swords
- Knight's Cross, First Class of the Friedrich Order with Swords
- Hanseatic Cross (Hamburg version)
- Honour Cross of the World War 1914/1918
- Clasp to the Iron Cross (1939) 2nd Class (16 September 1939) and 1st Class (21 September 1939)
- Knight's Cross of the Iron Cross with Oak Leaves and Swords
  - Knight's Cross on 19 July 1940 as General der Infanterie and commanding general of the XXXVIII Army Corps
  - Oak Leaves on 14 March 1943 as Generalfeldmarschall and commander-in-chief of Army Group South
  - Swords on 30 March 1944 as Generalfeldmarschall and commander-in-chief of Army Group South

== Sources ==
- Axworthy, Mark; Scafeș, Cornel; Crăciunoiu, Cristian (1995). Third Axis, Fourth Ally: Romanian Armed Forces in the European War, 1941–1945. London: Arms and Armour. ISBN 978-1-85409-267-0.
- Bartov, Omer (1999). "Soldiers, Nazis and War in the Third Reich". In Leitz, Christian (ed.). The Third Reich. London: Blackwell. pp. 129–150. ISBN 978-0-631-20700-9.
- Beevor, Antony (1999). Stalingrad: The Fateful Siege, 1942–1943. New York: Penguin. ISBN 978-0-14-028458-4.
- Barratt, Stephen (2012). Zhitomir-Berdichev: German Operations West of Kiev, 24 December, 1943–31 January, 1944. Solihull: Helion. ISBN 978-1-907677-66-3.
- Burleigh, Michael (2000). The Third Reich: A New History. New York: Hill and Wang. ISBN 0-8090-9326-X.
- Evans, Richard J. (2008). The Third Reich at War. New York: Penguin Group. ISBN 978-0-14-311671-4.
- Forczyk, Robert (2008). Sevastopol 1942: Von Manstein's Triumph. Oxford: Osprey. ISBN 978-1-84603-465-7.
- Forczyk, Robert (2010). Manstein: Leadership – Strategy – Conflict. Oxford: Osprey. ISBN 978-1-84603-221-9.
- Glantz, David M. (1995). When Titans Clashed: How the Red Army Stopped Hitler. Lawrence, KS: University Press of Kansas. ISBN 978-0-7006-0899-7.
- Glantz, David M.; House, Jonathan M. (1999). The Battle of Kursk. Lawrence, KS: University Press of Kansas. ISBN 978-0-7006-1335-9.
- "Judgment of International Military Tribunal: The Accused Organizations". The Avalon Project. New Haven, Connecticut: Yale Law School, Lillian Goldman Law Library. 30 September 1946.
- Knopp, Guido (creator, director) (1998). Hitler's Warriors: The Strategist (television documentary). Germany: ZDF.
- Knopp, Guido (2000). Hitlers Krieger [Hitler's Warriors] (in German). Munich: Goldmann Verlag. ISBN 3-442-15045-0.
- Kopp, Roland (2003). "Die Wehrmacht feiert. Kommandeurs-Reden zu Hitlers 50. Geburtstag am 20. April 1939". Militärgeschichtliche Zeitschrift (in German). 62 (2). Militärgeschichtliches Forschungsamt: 471–535. doi:10.1524/mgzs.2003.62.2.471. S2CID 185220452.
- Kosk, Henryk P (2001). Generalicja Polska: Popularny Słownik Biograficzny. T. 2, M – Ż, suplement (in Polish). Pruszków: Oficyna Wydawnicza Ajaks. ISBN 978-83-87103-81-1.
- Lingen, Kerstin von (2009). Kesselring's Last Battle: War Crimes Trials and Cold War Politics, 1945-1960. US: University Press of Kansas. ISBN 978-0-7006-1641-1.
- Lemay, Benoît (2010). Erich von Manstein: Hitler's Master Strategist. Heyward, Pierce (trans.). Havertown, PA; Newbury, Berkshire: Casemate. ISBN 978-1-935149-26-2.
- Longerich, Heinz Peter (2003), "10. Hitler and the Mass Murders in Poland 1939/40", Hitler's Role in the Persecution of the Jews by the Nazi Regime, Atlanta: Emory University, archived from the original on 1 October 2015.
- Manstein, Erich (2004) [1955]. Powell, Anthony G (ed.). Lost Victories: The War Memoirs of Hitler's Most Brilliant General. St. Paul, MN: Zenith. ISBN 0-7603-2054-3.
- McKale, Donald M. (2012). Nazis After Hitler: How Perpetrators of the Holocaust Cheated Justice and Truth. Lanham, MD: Rowman & Littlefield. ISBN 978-1-4422-1316-6.
- Melvin, Mungo (2010). Manstein: Hitler's Greatest General. London: Weidenfeld & Nicolson. ISBN 978-0-297-84561-4.
- Murray, Williamson; Millett, Allan Reed (2000). A War To Be Won: Fighting the Second World War. Cambridge, Mass: Belknap Press of Harvard University Press. ISBN 978-0-674-00680-5.
- Nipe, George M. Jr. (2000). Last Victory in Russia: The SS-Panzerkorps and Manstein's Kharkov Counteroffensive, February–March 1943. Atglen, PA: Schiffer. ISBN 0-7643-1186-7.
- Paget, Baron Reginald Thomas (1952). Manstein: Seine Feldzüge und sein Prozess (in German). Wiesbaden: Limes Verlag. OCLC 16731799.
- Scherzer, Veit (2007). Die Ritterkreuzträger 1939–1945 Die Inhaber des Ritterkreuzes des Eisernen Kreuzes 1939 von Heer, Luftwaffe, Kriegsmarine, Waffen-SS, Volkssturm sowie mit Deutschland verbündeter Streitkräfte nach den Unterlagen des Bundesarchives [The Knight's Cross Bearers 1939–1945 The Holders of the Knight's Cross of the Iron Cross 1939 by Army, Air Force, Navy, Waffen-SS, Volkssturm and Allied Forces with Germany According to the Documents of the Federal Archives] (in German). Jena, Germany: Scherzers Militaer-Verlag. ISBN 978-3-938845-17-2.
- Smelser, Ronald; Davies, Edward (2008). The Myth of the Eastern Front: The Nazi-Soviet War in American Popular Culture. Cambridge: Cambridge University Press. ISBN 978-0-521-71231-6.
- Stein, Marcel (2000). Generalfeldmarschall Erich von Manstein: Kritische Betrachtung des Soldaten und Menschen [A Flawed Genius: Field Marshal Walter Model, A Critical Biography] (in German). Mainz: Hase und Koehler. ISBN 978-3-7758-1387-7.
- Thomas, Franz (1998). Die Eichenlaubträger 1939–1945 Band 2: L–Z [The Oak Leaves Bearers 1939–1945 Volume 2: L–Z] (in German). Osnabrück, Germany: Biblio-Verlag. ISBN 978-3-7648-2300-9.
- "Fritz von Manstein: Jan. 10, 1944". Time. Time Warner. 10 January 1944. Archived from the original on 3 July 2007.
- Weinberg, Gerhard (2005) [1994]. A World at Arms: A Global History of World War II. New York: Cambridge University Press. ISBN 978-0-521-85316-3.

Military offices
| Preceded by Generaloberst Eugen Ritter von Schobert | Commander of 11. Armee; 21 September 1941 – 21 November 1942 | Succeeded by Army Group Don |
| Preceded by: 11. Armee | Commander of Army Group Don; 21 November 1942 – 12 February 1943 | Succeeded by Army Group South |
| Preceded by Generalfeldmarschall Maximilian von Weichs | Commander of Army Group South; 12 February 1943 – 30 March 1944 | Succeeded by Generalfeldmarschall Walter Model |
Awards and achievements
| Preceded by George Marshall | Cover of Time magazine 10 January 1944 | Succeeded by Oveta Culp Hobby |
