= Gertrud von Hindenburg =

German noblewoman and philanthropist

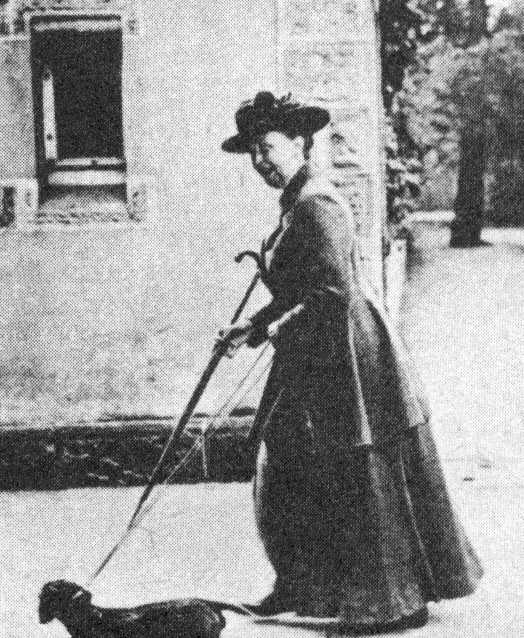
- Gertrud in 1920
- Born: Gertrud Wilehlmine von Sperling; 4 December 1860; Magdeburg, Province of Saxony, Kingdom of Prussia
- Died: 14 May 1921 (aged 60); Hanover, Weimar Republic
- Burial place: Elisabeth Church, Marburg, Hesse, Germany
- Occupation(s): Noblewoman, philanthropist
- Spouse: Paul von Hindenburg (m. 1879)
- Children: 4, including Oskar
- Parent(s): Oskar von Sperling; Pauline von Klass

Gertrud Wilhelmine von Beneckendorff und von Hindenburg (née von Sperling; 4 December 1860 – 14 May 1921) was a German noblewoman and philanthropist. She was the wife of Paul von Hindenburg, the Chief of the German Army Command in the second half of the First World War and President of Germany from 1925.

== Biography ==
Gertrud von Hindenburg was born as Gertrud Wilhelmine von Sperling, the daughter of the Prussian Major General Oskar von Sperling (1814–1872) and his wife Pauline von Klass. Her older brother was infantry general Kurt von Sperling (1850–1914).

Sometime in the mid-1870s Gertrud von Sperling met her future husband in Stettin, where he belonged to the General Command of the II Army Corps. On 24 September 1879 the two married in Stettin after Hindenburg's promotion to captain in 1878 had created the material conditions for a marriage. From the union four children were born: Irmengard Pauline (born 14 November 1880 – 1948), an unnamed still-born son (1881), Oskar Wilhelm (31 January 1883 – 12 February 1960) and Anne Marie (born 29 November 1891 in Berlin; died 8 April 1978 in Hanover).

In his 1920 autobiography, Paul von Hindenburg praised Gertrud as "a loving wife, who through joy and sorrow faithfully and tirelessly worked with me and took care of me... My best friend and comrade". As well as being described by family relatives as "living for her family... a shield for her husband against any inconveniences or concerns", Gertrud von Hindenburg was also generally considered as someone of great wit and "better-read than her husband". She had a keen interest in theater, music, and painting, and corresponded with many prominent contemporaries, such as the industrialist and politician Walther Rathenau, whom shortly before her death she urged he accept the post of Foreign Minister.

Once married, Mrs. von Hindenburg accompanied her husband to his various relocations as troop commander and staff officer in Stettin, Karlsruhe, Berlin, Magdeburg and, finally, to Hanover after her husband's 1911 retirement. Upon her husband's reactivation during World War I and his rise to the highest military functions, Gertrud von Hindenburg took over mainly charitable works, such as personally caring for the war wounded and founding the Gertrud von Hindenburg Foundation for moral strengthening of German youth.

Following the war, Gertrud lived with her husband again in Hanover, where she died in 1921 from cancer. She was initially buried in Hanover until 1927, when, at her husband's request, she was exhumed and reburied at the East Prussian ancestral home of the von Hindenburgs, the manor Neudeck in Rosenberg, which had at that time been returned to the family. Paul von Hindenburg too desired to be buried alongside his wife at Neudeck but, after his death on 2 August 1934, Adolf Hitler forbade a funeral at Neudeck, instead having Gertrud's coffin again re-exhumed so that she could be buried alongside her husband at the Tannenberg Memorial near the East Prussian town of Hohenstein. Later, to prevent the bodies falling into the hands of Soviet Armed Forces as they approached East Prussia in spring 1945, the coffins were again removed on 12 January 1945 by Hitler's orders to Königsberg on the cruiser Emden. The two coffins lay in a salt mine in Thuringia until after the war's end, when they were eventually discovered in summer 1945 by the U.S. Armed Forces. In August 1946, the remains of Gertrud von Hindenburg were finally laid to rest beside those of her husband at the tower hall of the Elisabeth Church in Marburg.
