= Oskar von Sperling =

German general (1814–1872)

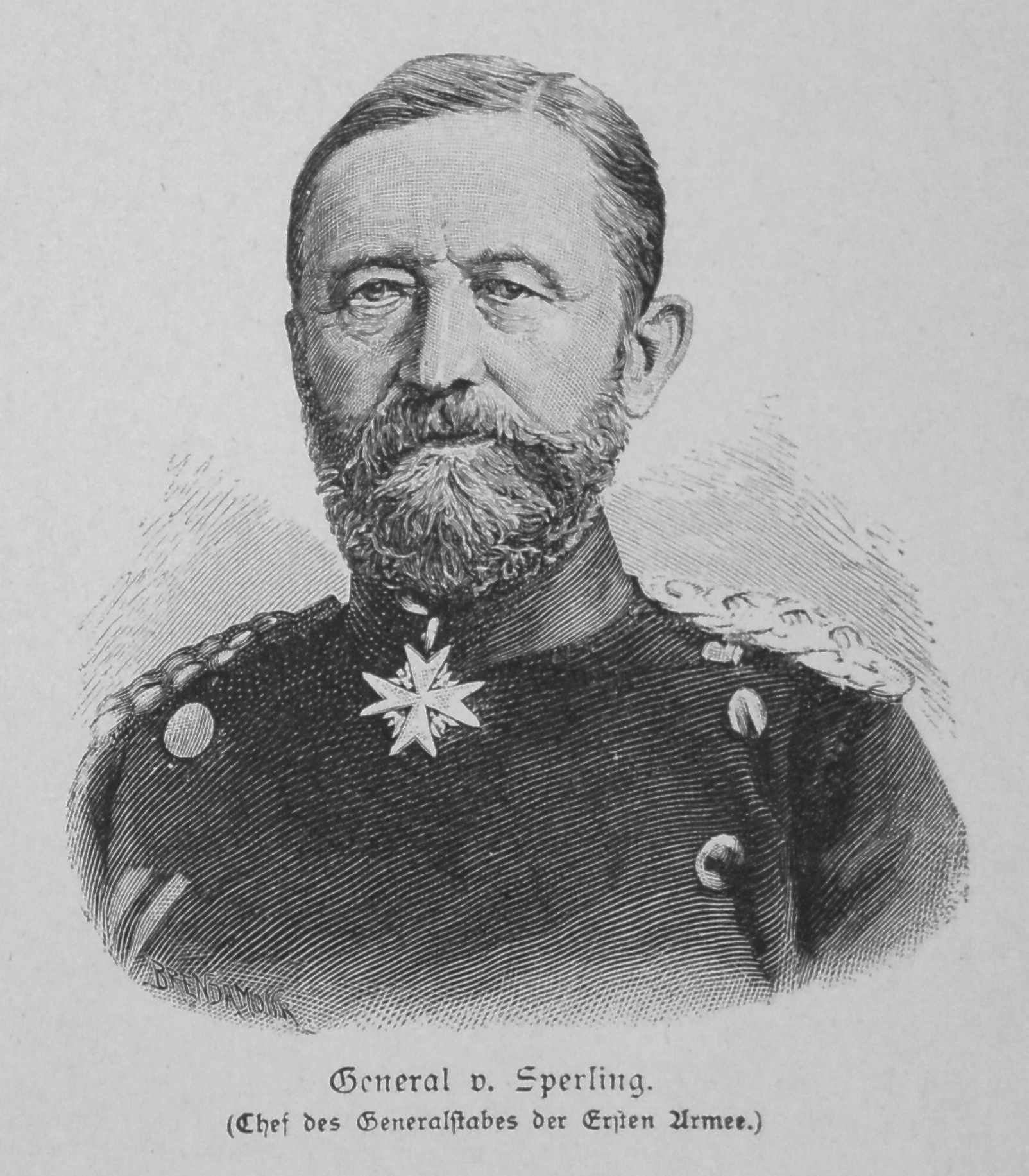
- Born: 31 January 1814; Kölleda
- Died: 1 May 1872 (aged 58); Dresden, Kingdom of Saxony, German Empire
- Military career
- Allegiance: Prussia; German Empire
- Branch: Prussian Army; Imperial German Army
- Service years: 1832–1872
- Rank: Generalmajor
- Commands: Chief of Staff, VI Corps; Chief of Staff, First Army
- Conflicts: Baden Revolution; Second Schleswig War; Austro-Prussian War; Franco-Prussian War
- Awards: Pour le Mérite

Oskar Ernst Karl von Sperling (31 January 1814 in Kölleda – 1 May 1872 in Dresden) was a German major general who served during the Baden Revolution and the Second Schleswig, Austro-Prussian, and Franco-Prussian wars. He was the father-in-law of Paul von Hindenburg and maternal grandfather of Erich von Manstein.

== Life ==
Oskar von Sperling was born the first son of Ernst Wilhelm von Sperling.

Sperling entered the Prussian Army in 1832 as an officer candidate in the 31st Infantry Regiment. In 1835, Sperling was appointed as Second lieutenant. Between 1838 and 1841 he was a student at the Prussian Staff College. Afterwards he served as an adjutant in the Topographical Department of the Prussian General Staff. Then, as an adjutant in the 29th Infantry Regiment, Sperling participated in the suppression of the Baden Revolution. Promoted to captain on 16 November 1852, he remained in the 15th Division as an adjutant until April 1857. He then briefly served as company commander in the 32nd Infantry Regiment before returning to the general staff in January 1858, with a promotion to major. In 1860 he was sent to Italy as a military obeserver, where he attended the Siege of Gaeta. On 18 October 1861, by now having returned to Prussia, Sperling was promoted to Oberstleutnant. In March 1863 he became Chief of Staff of the VI Corps, which was stationed at Breslau. In this position Sperling participated in the Second Schleswig War. On 18 June 1865 Sperling was promoted to Oberst. In the same year Helmuth von Moltke, the Chief of the General Staff, wrote in his assessment that von Sperrling was a highly talented officer.

During the Austro-Prussian War he participated in the campaign in Bohemia with the corps being part of the Second Army, commanded by Crown Prince Frederick William of Prussia. He fought in the Battle of Königgrätz and received the Pour le Mérite on 16 September 1866, on recommendation of General of the Cavalry Louis von Mutius. The latter wrote "I owe it to the restless activity of Colonel von Sperling and his sensible measures that the troops of the VI Corps intervened in the Battle of Königgrätz at the right time, and his personal prowess on the battlefield itself gives him a just claim to the coveted award, for which I commend him to Your Most High Grace."

In 1868, Sperling was promoted to Generalmajor. During the Franco-Prussian War, Sperling was the chief of staff of the First Army, commanded by Karl Friedrich von Steinmetz and later by Edwin Freiherr von Manteuffel. However as his health declined, Sperling soon returned to Germany and retired from active service. On 22 March 1872 he received a bonus of 50,000 thalers. Sperling died on 1 May 1872 in Dresden.

== Family ==
Oskar von Sperling married Pauline Marie Albertine von Klass, the daughter of General Wilhelm von Klass, in 1845 and had 7 children. Their children included Kurt von Sperling, and Gertrud von Sperling who eventually married Paul von Hindenburg.

== Honours ==
=== German States ===
Kingdom of Prussia

- Iron Cross (1870) (First and Second classes)
- Order of the Crown (Third Class)
- Pour le Merite

Baden

- Order of the Zähringer Lion (Second Class)

== Literature ==
- Julius von Pflugk-Harttung, Geschichte des Krieges 1870-71 Union, Deutsche Verlagsgesellschaft, Stuttgart 1895, pg. 229.
- Kurt von Priesdorff, Soldatisches Führertum Volume 8, Hanseatische Verlagsanstalt Hamburg, undated [Hamburg], undated [1941], DNB 367632837, pg. 33–36, no. 2468
- Anonymous (1871). Philologischer Anzeiger, Volume 3 (in German).
