= Verkhnekumsky =

Verkhnekumsky Верхнекумский
- Khutor
- Location within Volgograd Oblast Location within Russia
- Coordinates: 48°05′N 43°26′E
- Country: Russia
- Region: Volgograd Oblast
- District: Oktyabrsky District
- Time zone: UTC+4:00

Verkhnekumsky (Russian: Верхнекумский) is a rural locality (a khutor) in Sovetskoye Rural Settlement, Oktyabrsky District, Volgograd Oblast, Russia. The population was 190 as of 2010. There are 4 streets.

== Geography ==
Verkhnekumsky is located in steppe, on Yergeni, 29 km northwest of Oktyabrsky (the district's administrative centre) by road. Sovetsky is the nearest rural locality.
