= Lost Victories =

1955 book by Erich von Manstein

Verlorene Siege Lost Victories
- An early English-language edition of Lost Victories
- Author: Erich von Manstein
- Translator: Anthony G.Powell
- Language: English, German
- Genre: Memoir
- Publication date: 1955
- English publication date: 1958
- Media type: Print

Verlorene Siege (English: Lost Victories; full title of English edition: Lost Victories: The War Memoirs of Hitler's Most Brilliant General) is the personal narrative of Erich von Manstein, a German field marshal during World War II. The book was first published in West Germany in 1955, then in Spain in 1956. Its English translation was published in 1958 for distribution in the UK and the US.

Many historians have called Verlorene Siege unreliable and apologetic. German historian Volker Berghahn wrote about the book, "Its title gave the story away: it had been Hitler's dogmatism and constant interference with the strategic plans and operational decisions of the professionals that had cost Germany its victory against Stalin".

== Analysis of themes ==
=== On the Red Army ===
Manstein portrayed the average Soviet soldier as courageous but poorly led. Depicting the Soviet officer corps as hopelessly incompetent, he portrayed the war on the Eastern Front as a German army vastly superior in fighting ability being steadily ground down by an opponent superior only in numbers. According to The Myth of the Eastern Front by Ronald Smelser and Edward J. Davies, that aspect of Verlorene Siege was self-serving, as it allowed Manstein to ignore several occasions, such as the fall of Kiev in November 1943, in which he was deceived and defeated by the Stavka.

=== On German generals ===
Manstein disparaged other German generals, portraying them as incompetent. Manstein took the credit for German victories and blamed Hitler and his fellow generals for every defeat. His arch-enemy was General Franz Halder; according to Manstein, although Halder understood that Hitler's leadership was defective, he lacked the courage to do anything about it. Smelser and Davies also called Manstein's criticism of Hitler self-serving. The general falsely claimed that he wanted the 6th Army to be pulled out of Stalingrad after it was encircled, only to be overruled by Hitler, and attacked Hitler for launching Operation Citadel, a plan developed by Manstein himself for execution months earlier, before the buildup of Soviet defenses.

=== Absence of politics and war crimes ===
Manstein avoided political issues, treating the war as an operational matter. He expressed no regret for serving a genocidal regime, and nowhere in Verlorene Siege did Manstein condemn National Socialism on moral grounds; Hitler was criticized only for faulty strategic decisions. Manstein's lament for Germany's "lost victories" in the Second World War implied that the world would have benefited from a Nazi victory. Manstein falsely claimed that he did not enforce the Commissar Order and omitted any mention of his role in the Holocaust, such as sending 2,000 of his soldiers to help the SS massacre 11,000 Jews in Simferopol in November 1941.

== Translation ==
=== Missing English passages ===
There are several passages conspicuously missing in the English version of this book but present in the original German. Here are a few:

Der Mittelteil der Krim war eine Ebene, fast baumlose, aber fruchtbare Landschaft, über die allerdings im Winter die eisigen Winde aus den weiten Steppengebieten der Ostukraine hinwegbrausten. Hier gab es große, gut bewirtschaftete Kolchosen, deren Inventar die Sowjets natürlich zerstört oder fortgeschleppt hatten. Wir gingen alsbald daran, soweit es die Aufrechterhaltung der Produktion irgend zulief, den enteigneten Bauern ihr Land als Eigentum wiederzugeben. So standen sie zumeist auf unserer Seite, waren damit aber auch dem Terror der im Jailagebirge kämpfenden Partisanen ausgesetzt.

The central part of the Crimea was a flat, almost treeless but fertile landscape, over which, however, in winter the icy winds from the vast steppe regions of the eastern Ukraine blew. Here there were large, well-managed collective farms, whose inventory the Soviets had of course destroyed or carried away. We immediately set about restoring the land to the dispossessed peasants as property, as far as it was possible to maintain production. So they were mostly on our side, but were also exposed to the terror of the partisans fighting in the Jaila Mountains.

pp 232

Die Tataren stellten sich sogleich auf unsere Seite. Sie sahen in uns die Befreier vom bolschewistischen Joch, zumal wir ihre religiösen Gebrauche streng achteten. Eine Abordnung von ihnen erschien bei mir, um mir Obst und handgewebte schöne Stoffe für ihren Befreier "Adolf Effendi" zu übergeben.

The Tatars immediately took our side. They saw in us the liberators from the Bolshevik yoke, especially since we strictly respected their religious customs. A delegation of them came to me to give me fruit and beautiful hand-woven fabrics for their liberator, "Adolf Effendi."

pp233

Der Erfolg dieser Hilfe, wie auch die Achtung, die wir ihrer religiösen Einstellung entgegenbrachten, hat dazu geführt, daß die in der Masse tatarische Bevölkerung der Krim uns durchaus freundlich gegenüberstand. Wir konnten sogar aus den Tataren bewaffnete Selbstschutzkompanien aufstellen, deren Aufgabe es war, ihre Dörfer gegen die Überfalle der im Jaila~-Gebirge eingenisteten Partisanen zu schützen.

The success of this aid, as well as the respect we showed for their religious beliefs, led to the fact that the Crimean population, who were largely Tatar, was quite friendly towards us. We were even able to set up armed self-defence companies from the Tatars, whose task it was to protect their villages against attacks by the partisans who had settled in the Jaila Mountains.

pp247

Daß es auf der Krim von Anbeginn eine starke Partisanen-Bewegung gab, die uns viel zu schaffen machte, lag daran, daß die Bevölkerung der Krim neben den Tataren und anderen Volkssplittern auch eine große Zahl von Russen enthielt. Sie waren z. T. erst unter dem bolschewistischen Regime auf die Krim gebracht worden. Aus diesen und den zahlreichen bei den ersten Kämpfen im Gebirge Versprengten rekrutierten sich die Partisanen vorwiegend.

The fact that there was a strong partisan movement in the Crimea from the very beginning, which caused us a lot of trouble, was due to the fact that the population of the Crimea included not only the Tatars and other ethnic splinters but also a large number of Russians. Some of them had only been brought to the Crimea under the Bolshevik regime. The partisans were mainly recruited from these and the numerous people who had been scattered during the first fighting in the mountains.

pp247

== Reception ==
=== Moral perspective ===
After Verlorene Siege was published, the West German newspaper Die Zeit asked about Manstein's account: "What would it have signified for the world and for Germany, what would it have signified for a Christian and gentleman like Manstein if these victories had not been lost?" German historian Jürgen Förster wrote in 1998 that for too long, most Germans accepted at face value self-serving claims by generals such as Manstein and Siegfried Westphal in their memoirs that the Wehrmacht was a professional, apolitical force who were victims (not followers) of Adolf Hitler; these evaded the issue of Wehrmacht war crimes.

In 2004, historian Volker Berghahn called Manstein's memoirs "totally unreliable"; if more had been known about his war crimes during the 1940s, he might have been hanged. According to Berghahn, "By the time Christian Streit published his book Keine Kameraden about the mass murder of Red Army prisoners of war at the hands of the Wehrmacht, professional historians firmly accepted what Manstein and his comrades had denied and covered up, i.e., that the Wehrmacht had been deeply involved in the criminal and genocidal policies of the Nazi regime". Historians Ronald Smelser and Edward J. Davies noted that nowhere in his memoirs or other post-war writings did Manstein explicitly condemn National Socialism. Max Egremont called the memoir "arrogant" and "self-serving" in Literary Review. Andrew Roberts wrote in The Storm of War that it has "rightly been condemned".

=== Operational perspective ===
S.L.A. Marshall said that the book is "An invaluable military book". In the preface to Lost Victories, military historian and officer Martin Blumenson wrote that Verlorene Siege was "the best book of memoirs on the German side and it is indispensable for understanding the conditions and circumstances of Hitler’s war." Military historian Robert M. Citino also found its operational details useful, but criticized Manstein for "defending his generalship and reputation, hiding his participation in war crimes, and blaming others for everything that went wrong"; and that "Lost Victories should come with a warning label: Use with Caution."

== See also ==
- Manstein Plan
- Clean Wehrmacht

== Sources ==
- Förster, Jürgen (1998). "Complicity or Entanglement? The Wehrmacht, the War and the Holocaust (pages 266–283)". In Michael Berenbaum & Abraham Peck (ed.). The Holocaust and History The Known, the Unknown, the Disputed and the Reexamined. Bloomington: Indian University Press. ISBN 978-0-253-33374-2.
- Smelser, Ronald; Davies, Edward J. (2008). The Myth of the Eastern Front: the Nazi-Soviet war in American popular culture. New York: Cambridge University Press. ISBN 9780521833653.
