= Army Group Don =

- German: Heeresgruppe Don
- Active: 21 Nov 1942 — 12 Feb 1943
- Country: Nazi Germany
- Branch: Heer ( Wehrmacht)
- Type: Army group
- Size: 3–5 armies
- Engagements: Battle of Stalingrad

Commanders
- Notable commanders: Erich von Manstein

Army Group Don (German: Heeresgruppe Don) was a short-lived army group of the German Army during World War II. It existed between November 1942 and February 1943 and was primarily concerned with the Battle of Stalingrad, which was concurrently fought.

== History ==
After a large-scale Soviet counterattack, "Operation Uranus", had resulted in the encirclement of the German 6th Army, Adolf Hitler named Erich von Manstein as commander of a newly-formed "Army Group Don," named for the Don River, on 20 November 1942. The new formation was to consist of 6th Army, 4th Panzer Army and the remnants of the Romanian 3rd and 4th Armies.

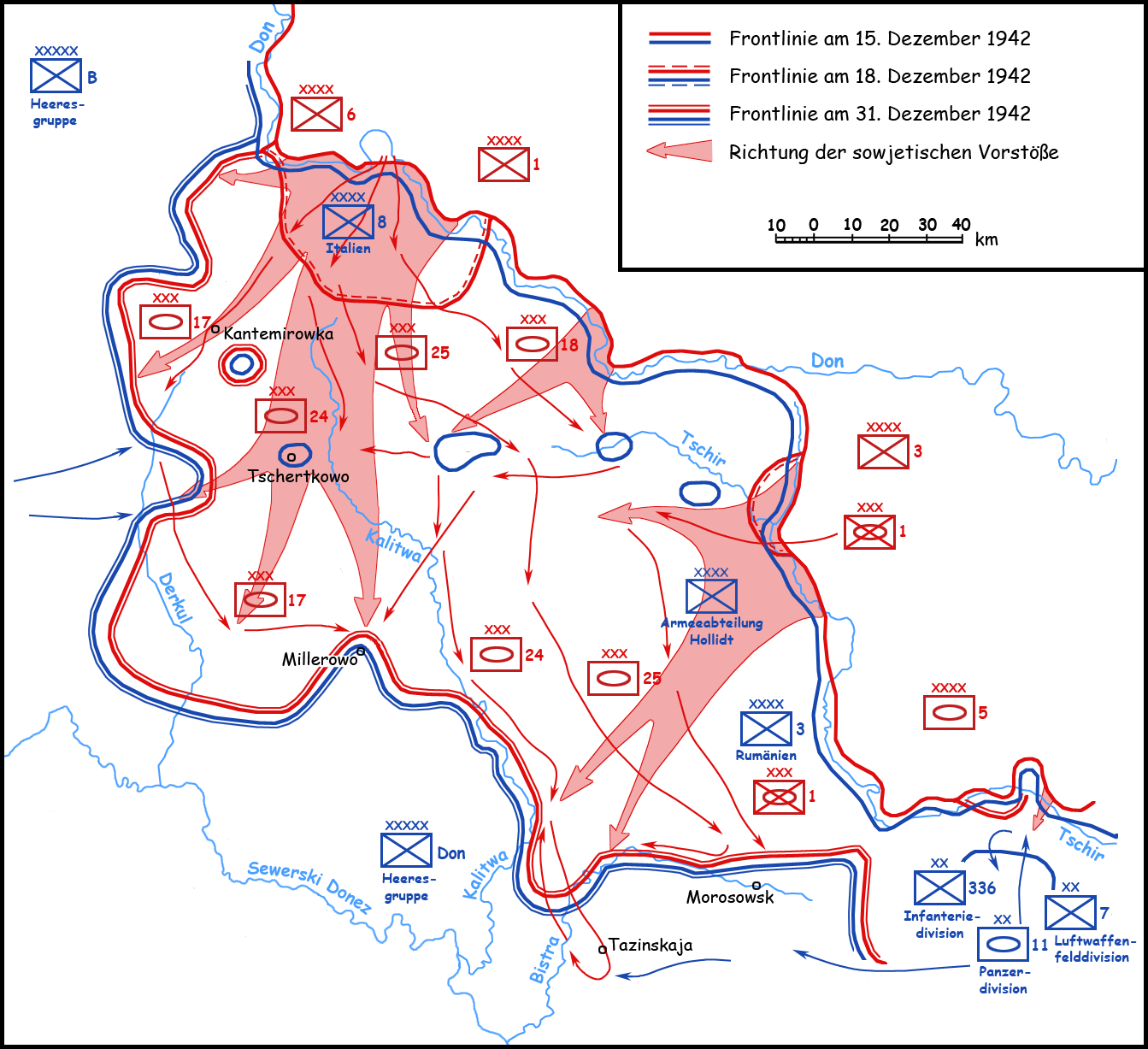
Map depicting Operation Little Saturn (December 1942); Army Group Don can be seen at the bottom (south) of the map.

Army Group Don was created from the headquarters of the Eleventh Army in the southern sector of the Eastern Front on 22 November 1942. Army Group Don only lasted until February 1943 when it was combined with Army Group B and was made into the new Army Group South.

The only commander of Army Group Don during its short history was Field Marshal (Generalfeldmarschall) Erich von Manstein. It consisted of the Sixth Army in the Stalingrad pocket, which included the encircled elements of the 4th Panzer Army, together with the Romanian Third Army.

Zhukov stated, "We now know that Manstein's plan to rescue the encircled forces at Stalingrad was to organize two shock forces - at Kotelnikovo and Tormosin." The attempt "was a total failure."

== Commanders ==
No.	Portrait	Commander	Took office	Left office	Time in office
1	Erich von Manstein	Generalfeldmarschall; Erich von Manstein (1887–1973)	21 November 1942	12 February 1943	83 days

== Bibliography ==
- Tessin, Georg (1980). Die Landstreitkräfte: Namensverbände / Die Luftstreitkräfte (Fliegende Verbände) / Flakeinsatz im Reich 1943–1945 [Ground forces: Named units and formations / Air forces (Flying units and formations) / Anti–aircraft service in the Reich 1943–1945] (in German). Vol. 14. Osnabrück: Biblio. ISBN 3-7648-1111-0.
