= Chir (river) =

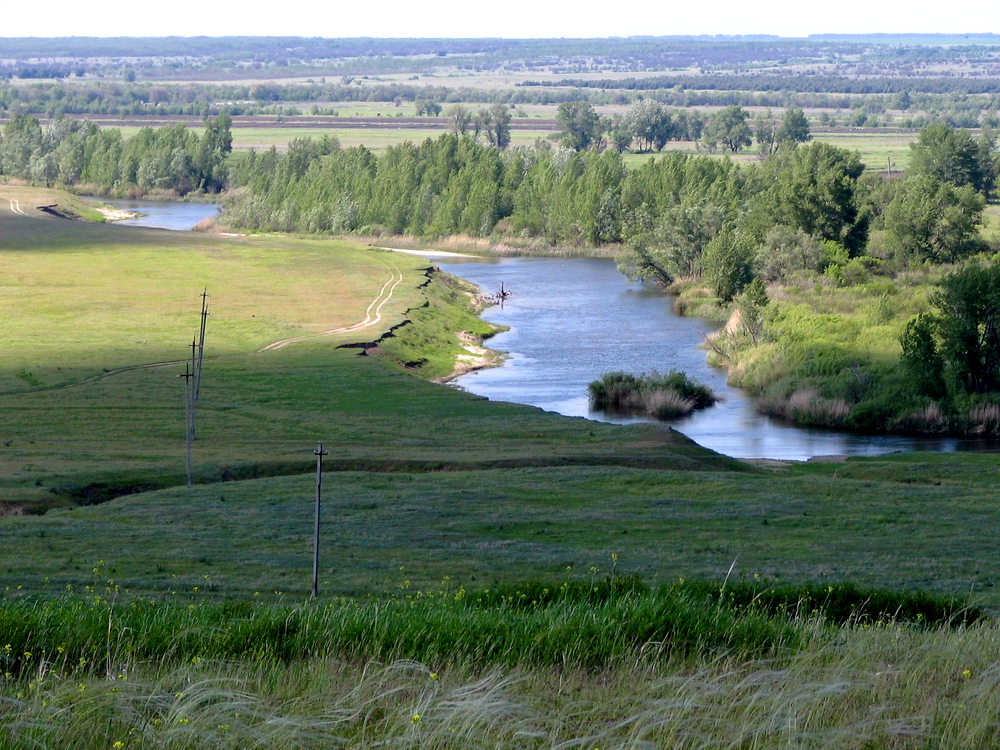

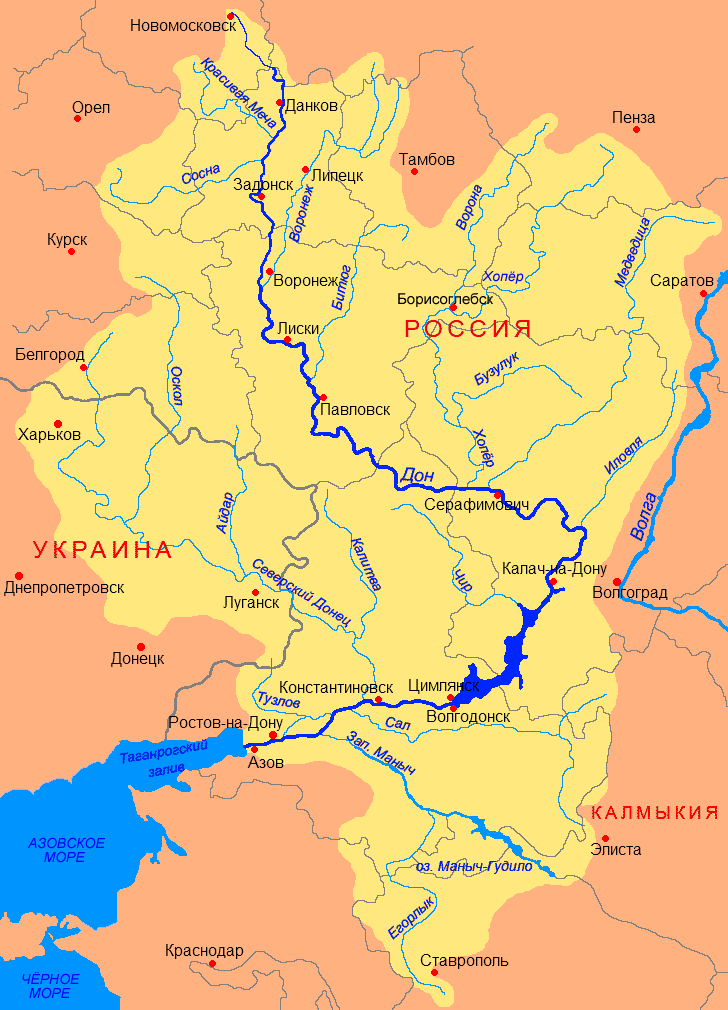
- The Chir in the Don basin
- Native name: Чир (Russian)

Location
- Country: Russia

Physical characteristics
- Source
  - coordinates: 49°23′43″N 41°09′08″E
- Mouth: Don
  - location: Tsimlyansk Reservoir
  - coordinates: 48.439°N 43.084°E
- Length: 317 km (197 mi)
- Basin size: 9,580 km^{2} (3,700 sq mi)

Basin features
- Progression: Don→ Sea of Azov

The Chir (Russian: Чир) is a river in Rostov and Volgograd oblasts of Russia. It is a right tributary of the Don, and is 317 kilometres (197 mi) long, with a drainage basin of 9,580 square kilometres (3,700 mi^{2}).
