= 73rd Guards Rifle Division =

- Active: 1943–1946
- Country: Soviet Union
- Branch: Red Army
- Type: Division
- Role: Infantry
- Engagements: Battle of Kursk; Belgorod-Kharkov Offensive; Poltava-Kremenchug Offensive; Battle of the Dniepr; Kirovograd Offensive; Nikopol–Krivoi Rog Offensive; Odessa Offensive; First Jassy–Kishinev Offensive; Second Jassy–Kishinev Offensive; Belgrade Offensive; Budapest Offensive; Operation Spring Awakening; Nagykanizsa–Körmend Offensive; Vienna Offensive
- Decorations: Order of the Red Banner
- Battle honours: Stalingrad; Danube

Commanders
- Notable commanders: Maj. Gen. Ganii Bekinovich Safiulin; Maj. Gen. Semyon Antonovich Kozak; Col. Vasilii Ivanovich Shcherbenko

The 73rd Guards Rifle Division was reformed as an elite infantry division of the Red Army in March 1943, based on the 2nd formation of the 38th Rifle Division, and served in that role until after the end of the Great Patriotic War.

As the 38th it had fought in the Battle of Stalingrad and distinguished itself during Operation Ring in the 64th Army. It remained assigned to that Army when it was redesignated as the 7th Guards Army. Unusually, the division, as well as its four regiments, were all granted honorific titles following the battle. It moved north to the Kursk area joining Voronezh Front and played an important role in the defense of the Northern Donets River south of the salient as part of the 25th Guards Rifle Corps during Operation Zitadelle. Following this victory it fought in the Belgorod-Kharkov Offensive in August and continued advancing toward the Dniepr River into the early autumn. Over the winter it took part in the complex battles in the great bend of the Dniepr, now as part of the 57th Army's 64th Rifle Corps in 2nd Ukrainian Front; it would remain under these Army (with one brief reassignment) and Corps commands for the duration of the war. The 73rd Guards advanced east to the Dniestr River in the spring of 1944 and then in July took part in the offensive that drove Romania out of the Axis. Entering Bulgaria and then Yugoslavia it assisted partisan brigades in the liberation of Belgrade, for which it was awarded the Order of the Red Banner. In November the division made an assault crossing of the Danube for which it was further rewarded with its second honorific. The 73rd Guards ended the war in Austria and was disbanded in June 1946.

== Formation ==
The 38th was redesignated as the 73rd Guards on March 1, a month after the German surrender at Stalingrad, and officially received its Guards banner on April 21. Once the division completed its reorganization its order of battle was as follows:

- 209th Guards Abganerovo Rifle Regiment (from 29th Rifle Regiment)
- 211th Guards Basargino Rifle Regiment (from 48th Rifle Regiment)
- 214th Guards Voroponovo Rifle Regiment (from 343rd Rifle Regiment)
- 153rd Guards Urazovo Artillery Regiment (from 214th Artillery Regiment)
- 80th Guards Antitank Battalion
- 124th Antiaircraft Battery (until April 20, 1943)
- 161st Machine Gun Battalion (until April 21, 1943)
- 77th Guards Reconnaissance Company
- 84th Guards Sapper Battalion
- 104th Guards Signal Battalion (after December 7, 1944 104th Guards Signal Company)
- 78th Guards Medical/Sanitation Battalion
- 74th Guards Chemical Defense (Anti-gas) Company
- 76th Guards Motor Transport Company
- 75th Guards Field Bakery
- 71st Guards Divisional Veterinary Hospital
- 1705th Field Postal Station
- 1101st Field Office of the State Bank

Maj. Gen. Ganii Bekinovich Safiulin, who had commanded the 38th since June 15, 1942, remained in command. In reply to a request from the Don Front's Military Council and local authorities of Stalingrad Oblast the STAVKA had conferred the honorific "Stalingrad" on the division as a whole and individual titles on its regiments from four villages in the Oblast. As 64th Army moved north towards Kursk the German counteroffensive at Kharkov was unfolding. As elements of the SS Panzer Corps entered Belgorod on March 18 forces of the Soviet 69th Army were taking up a defense along the east bank of the Northern Donets. The next day the 73rd Guards began to assemble in the Shebekino - Miasoedovo area and on March 24 the 64th Army took over the 69th's defense sector. On April 17 the 64th officially became the 7th Guards, General Safiulin was moved to command of the new 25th Guards Rifle Corps and Col. Semyon Antonovich Kozak took over command of the division.

== Battle of Kursk ==
In the last gasp of the German offensive the SS Corps had gained a bridgehead over the Donets at Mikhailovka, south of the Staryi Gorod (Old Town) of Belgorod. The commander of Voronezh Front, Army Gen. N. F. Vatutin, made repeated demands of Lt. Gen. M. S. Shumilov, commander of 64th Army, that this bridgehead be eliminated. While it only contained about 9 sq. km. of firm ground it did compromise the Red Army defenses along the river. On April 16 two regiments of the 73rd Guards made a last effort to retake Mikhailovka, but failed. Following this the division set out to construct a system of defense in this sector according to the plans of the rest of the Army. On the night of May 4/5 the division was relieved of its first echelon positions by the 81st Guards Rifle Division and moved back to the Corps' second echelon; at this time the 73rd Guards was the weakest division of the 7th Guards Army with 6,824 personnel on strength. Over the following months the Corps was deployed on the Army's right flank with the 81st Guards on the right (north) flank, the 78th Guards Rifle Division on the left, and the 73rd in reserve. The division fortified a line from outside Sheino to Miasoedovo to the "Solovev" collective farm to the Korenskaya Dacha wooded ravine to outside Nikolskoe. The rifle regiments were arrayed in a single line and the 153rd Guards Artillery was deployed to support the 81st Guards, which was heavily reinforced with other artillery units as well.

German plan of attack at Kursk. Note location of the 7th Guards Army east and southeast of Belgorod.

By the start of the German offensive on July 5 the division had been able to rebuild its strength closer to establishment. It now had 8,617 personnel, 864 horses and 103 motor vehicles, and was equipped with 3,675 rifles, 2,241 sub-machine guns, 441 light and 140 heavy machine guns, 165 antitank rifles, 48 light, 64 medium and 20 heavy mortars, 45 antitank guns, 12 76mm regimental guns, 21 76mm cannons and 11 122mm howitzers. 7th Guards Army came under attack from Army Detachment Kempf, part of Army Group South, and 25th Guards Corps specifically faced the 7th, 6th and 19th Panzer Divisions of Gen. H. Breith's III Panzer Corps. 6th Panzer was partly deployed in the Mikhailovka bridgehead facing the 81st Guards, while the 19th Panzer was positioned to attack at the boundary of the 81st and 78th Guards in the direction of Miasoedovo, which was covered by the 73rd Guards; the latter was also an objective of 7th Panzer. The overall German plan was to link up with the II SS Panzer Corps which was attacking the 6th Guards Army to the north, and encircle and destroy the Red Army forces in between.

Overnight on July 4/5 a sapper of the German 168th Infantry Division deserted and was brought to General Safiulin's 25th Guards Corps headquarters, where he reported that the offensive would begin in the morning. At 0330 hours a preemptive artillery bombardment began against Army Detachment Kempf; the 153rd Guards Regiment fired 306 76mm and 87 122mm shells at the German assembly areas which helped to disrupt the concentration of 6th Panzer into the Mikhailovka bridgehead. During the morning the 81st Guards was successful in repulsing both the 6th's and 19th Panzer's assault groups but to the south bitter fighting was underway on the boundary with the 78th Guards where several dozen tanks of 7th Panzer from the Solomino area had broken through to the Razumnoye railyard and the rifle battalion holding Nizhnii Olshanets was partly encircled. Colonel Kozak was alerted to intervene according to pre-battle plans, either by counterattack or by backstopping the 78th Guards. Before noon he had assembled his division on a line running from the woods north of the "Batratskaya Dacha" State Farm to the woods south of there.

Orders for the counterattack arrived from Safiulin at noon:

The 73rd Guards Rifle Division with the 167th Separate Tank Regiment, the 1438th Self-propelled Artillery Regiment (SU-122s) and the 30th Separate Destroyer Anti-tank Artillery Brigade are to assemble... in readiness to launch a counterattack in the direction of Krutoi Log and the Razumnoye railyard, further according to the situation, in order to restore the positions of the 78th Guards Rifle Division.

In addition Kozak received operational control of the 161st Guards Cannon Artillery Regiment and the 315th Guards Mortar Regiment. The assembly of this group of forces went slowly, including the mobile units. At 1500 hours the columns of the 209th and 214th Guards Regiments were only nearing the "Batratskaya Dacha" State Farm and still had more than 5 km to cover on foot. Most of the attached artillery had failed to arrive in the division's sector even by 1900 hours. Even as Kozak's troops were moving up the 7th Panzer Division kept advancing and after 1500 combat was already going on in the depth of the 78th Guards' defenses. By 1700 Nizhnii Olshanets was completely isolated and the lead panzers were closing on Krutoi Log, the main defensive position in the sector. However, heavy artillery fire was slowing their progress.

=== Battle for Krutoi Log ===
Just as the lead tanks of 7th Panzer reached the Razumnoye - Krutoi Log road Colonel Kozak was located at the forward observation post of the 78th Guards on Hill 209.6, 2.5 km northeast of Gremyachy. Kozak sent out several reconnaissance teams, one of which reported that Krutoi Rog had fallen and that 25 tanks, mounted with infantry, had arrived on the eastern outskirts of the village. This proved to be mistaken but on its basis Kozak made a number of important decisions as recorded in the divisional combat diary:

Having assessed the current situation, the division commander makes an independent decision: the 209th Guards Rifle Regiment with the 167th Tank Regiment and 1438th Self-propelled Artillery Regiment is to block the path to Belinskaia and through a counterattack is to gain time for the 214th Guards and 211th Guards Rifle Regiments - in the assembly area, in readiness to repel an enemy attack to the east and northeast.

While subsequent events are difficult to follow, this was a change to the mission of the 167th Tanks which had been preparing to advance with the latter two rifle regiments toward Krutoi Log. Instead it attacked alone at 1730 hours toward Razumnoye with 27 T-34s and 5 T-70s. In heavy fighting over 2 hours and 30 minutes with German tanks backed by artillery 20 T-34s and 4 T-70s were destroyed or knocked out. German losses are disputed; seven Tigers were claimed but this appears unlikely. Kozak reported that at about 1850 hours the headquarters of one regiment of the 78th Guards was moving into the church in Krutoi Log, that units of 7th Panzer had taken Hill 164.7 and several tanks had entered Generalovka. To counter these moves he committed the remnants of the 167th Tanks and the 3rd Battalion of his 209th Guards Regiment which by 2200 hours had freed the village and the hill. The day's fighting ended at about 2300 hours.

For July 6 General Shumilov initially issued orders to create a shock group based on the 73rd Guards in order to counterattack the III Panzer Corps but lost confidence in this plan in large part due to the lack of artillery on this axis; as one example the 153rd Guards Artillery Regiment was still in the 81st Guards' sector although Shumilov soon ordered its return to the 73rd. As well, sometime before midnight orders came down from I. V. Stalin to General Vatutin to cancel various counterattack plans across the Front. Colonel Kozak also made a number of decisions to strengthen his antitank defenses. He ordered the remaining 12 T-34s and one T-70 of the 167th Tanks and the 22 SU-122s of the 1438th SU Regiment to dig in on the south and southwest fringe of the woods lying 1 km north of Krutoi Log to create an antitank region in the positions of the 209th and 214th Guards Regiments opposite the front of the 7th Panzer. At the same time the 201st Tank Brigade had arrived on the division's left flank along with the 1669th Destroyer Antitank Artillery Regiment and the 1529th Heavy Self-propelled Artillery Regiment (SU-152s): these began to set up a second antitank region in the area of the "Poliana" State Farm to cover the boundary with the 213th Rifle Division.

The German attack opened at around 0400 hours with a powerful artillery preparation including heavy gun and Nebelwerfer fire against the left flank of the 81st Guards and the sector of the 78th and 73rd Guards which lasted almost two hours. Among the most important objectives for Army Detachment Kempf at this point were Razumnoye and Krutoi Log which were splitting its advancing corps and hampering the advance of the 7th and 19th Panzers with flanking fire. The latter village was in the sector of the 106th Infantry Division. That division's Infantry Regiment 240 was ordered to take it from units of the 78th Guards that had fallen back to it the previous day while a detachment of 7th Panzer's Panzer Regiment 25 was to attack positions of the 73rd Guards in the direction of Hill 191.2. By about 0730 hours the 209th and 214th Guards Regiments joined combat in the sector from Generalovka to Hill 164.7 to Hill 191.2 which was between the first and second Soviet fortified belts. German tanks first conducted a brief reconnaissance-in-force against the center of Lt. Col. V. I. Davydenko's 214th Guards, which was held by Cpt. Andrei Antonovich Belgin's 3rd Battalion; this was quickly repelled. Next, both regiments were attacked. The 209th Guards on the right flank under Lt. Col. G. P. Slatov was struck by 30 armored vehicles and up to a battalion of infantry in the direction of Generalovka. This regiment was backed by a powerful artillery grouping, including the 1438th SU Regiment and surviving tanks of the 167th Regiment. Its commander later wrote:

At 0800 12 Pz.Kpfw. VI tanks with a battalion of submachine gunners emerged on Hill 164.7 and went on the attack against the woods occupied by the 209th Guards Rifle Regiment and us. Having allowed the enemy tanks to approach within 400 metres, our tank crews... opened fire from fixed positions with their main guns, while the company of anti-tank rifles added its fire. As a result of the combat, the enemy was repulsed and the Germans fell back, leaving behind 3 knocked-out tanks and up to a company of dead submachine gunners on the battlefield.

The second attack against the two regiments was very strong. According to the divisional history there were 96 tanks in the panzer wedge rolling toward them and Hill 191.2 held by the 211th Guards Regiment. Heavy direct and indirect artillery fire separated the German infantry from the armor and as the boundary between the 209th and 214th was reached the tanks were hit by Katyusha rockets. According to Colonel Kozak's after-action report these two regiments fought off more than four attacks by the 7th Panzer over five hours.

A critical situation soon took shape in the area of Hill 187.4 as 28 German armored vehicles broke through to its foot. Lt. Colonel Davydenko ordered up the 1438th SU Regiment which went into action at 1000 hours, trading losses with the German grouping until it fell back. Meanwhile, elements of Infantry Regiment 240 broke into Krutoi Log from several directions. The defenders, the 225th Guards Regiment of the 78th Guards Division, reported that the German infantry were "totally numb to everything and were advancing literally head-on with no regard for losses." Prisoners were taken following hand-to-hand combat on some sectors, many of whom proved to be drunk on alcohol. Although accounts differ, it appears that the regiment had been encircled by 1100 hours and soon received orders to break out, although due to disrupted communications not all companies received these orders. These difficulties were made worse by attacks from Il-2 aircraft ordered by Colonel Kozak, who was unaware of the true situation in the village. Remnants of the 225th Guards managed to fight their way out to friendly lines by 1500.

By midday 7th Panzer had succeeded in seizing both Krutoi Log and Razumnoye but had failed to create a breach in the defenses of the 73rd Guards. Kozak reported:

The 209th Guards Rifle Regiment with 1/153rd Guards Artillery Regiment... is occupying the position indicated in the report for 1900 5.7.43. The regiment destroyed 11 tanks and up to a battalion of enemy infantry. The regiment has lost 15% of its men... The 214th Guards Rifle Regiment with 2/153rd Guards Artillery Regiment and a battery of the 1438th Self-propelled Artillery Regiment fought back an attack by up to 50 enemy tanks and are occupying its former position, locked in bitter fighting with tanks and submachine gunners... The regiment destroyed 19 tanks and up to a battalion of infantry... The regiment has lost up to 60% of its men, and the regiment's 45mm anti-tank battery has been destroyed... The 211th Guards Rifle Regiment with 3/153rd Guards Artillery Regiment... has twice repulsed up to two companies of submachine gunners with the support of 2 large-caliber machine guns. The regiment is holding its positions. The regiment destroyed up to 10 tanks, one large-caliber machine gun and up to a company of infantry. It has lost up to 5% of its men... I've decided... to give help to the 214th Guards Rifle Regiment with one battalion and to place 12 guns of the 30th Separate Destroyer Anti-tank Artillery Regiment at its disposal.

The 214th Guards Regiment had taken the brunt of the attack and during this fighting three of its men would become Heroes of the Soviet Union. The commander of its 3rd Battalion, Captain Belgin, organized the defense which went on for 13 hours, repelling up to 11 German attacks, accounting for about 600 German infantry and 14 tanks, one of which he destroyed himself. Belgin was killed during the battle. The commander of Belgin's 8th company, Cpt. Ivan Vasilievich Ilyasov, took over the battalion after Belgin and his senior adjutant were killed and continued to issue orders even after being wounded when his command post was partly destroyed; he lost his life when he was crushed by a German tank at his post. The commander of the battalion's signal platoon, Sen. Sgt. Sergei Petrovich Zorin, making his way between German vehicles, restored 12 breaks in his field telephone lines. Once his equipment was completely destroyed he carried four combat reports from Belgin to Lt. Colonel Davydenko, returning each time and knocking out a tank with an antitank grenade on one trip. Zorin survived the battle only to be killed by German artillery fire on August 24 near Merefa. Today a monument to all three men stands on Lenin Street in Krutoi Log.

During this fighting the 1st and 3rd Battalions of the 214th Guards Regiment were encircled but the 3rd clung to its positions tenaciously. Only 93 men were able to break out to friendly lines that evening. Reacting to the situation facing this regiment Colonel Kozak decided to shift the 1844th Destroyer Antitank Artillery Regiment to its sector. However by this time German tanks were blocking its route with fire. Kozak then ordered the Regiment to return to its previous positions in support of the 209th Guards Regiment. During this move it encountered the 209th retreating to the "Batratskaia Dacha" State Farm after German tanks had broken through its positions and were moving toward Iastrebovo. In part due to this misstep by Kozak by the end of the day the German forces had broken through the division's lines at the boundary with the 81st Guards and only thanks to the dispatch of reserves from 7th Guards Army was the advance stopped in the Iastrebovo area. The 2nd Battalion of the 209th Guards Regiment had lost half of its men and began to retreat toward the "Day of Harvest" collective farm in disorganized groups.

=== Fighting near "Batratskaia Dacha" ===
At 2200 hours Kozak reported to General Safiulin (in part):

209th Guards Rifle Regiment: the 2nd Battalion, having suffered up to 60% casualties, was hurled back to the "Day of Harvest" collective farm. The 1st and 3rd Battalions... were thrown back to the southern section of the "Batratskaia Dacha" orchards where they rallied and took up a line of defense... 214th Guards Rifle Regiment is holding the line: Point "Courtyard" lying 500 metres south of the "Batratskaia Dacha"... orchards, Point "K", Hill 209.6. The regiment has destroyed 39 enemy tanks, wiped out up to a battalion of infantry, and knocked out 6 vehicles. The regiment has lost: 600 men killed or wounded; 10 guns, 9 82mm mortars, 25 heavy machine guns, 24 anti-tank rifles, and 10 50mm mortars. 211th Guards Rifle Regiment is holding the line: Point "K", 1 kilometre northwest of Korenskaia Dacha, "Poliana" State Farm... The regiment has lost 14 dead, 48 wounded... and 3 anti-tank guns, one anti-tank rifle, two heavy machine guns, 2 light machine guns... 153rd Guards Artillery Regiment is in firing positions in the units' area of defense. The regiment has destroyed 29 enemy tanks and self-propelled guns. The regiment has lost 12 guns, and suffered 8 dead and 12 wounded.

Overnight the left-flank regiment of the 94th Guards Rifle Division was moved into the second echelon behind the positions of the 73rd Guards. Safiulin's orders from General Vatutin for July 7 were to hold his Corps' line. Before dawn the 106th Infantry went on the attack with up to a regiment, supported by 13 tanks towards the Koren River in the sector held by the 211th Guards Regiment, backed by remnants of two regiments of the 78th Guards and reinforced by the 201st Separate Tank Brigade (British Matilda and Valentine tanks). By 0500 hours this had been driven back with the loss of four German tanks knocked out. A further attack began at 0700 by was focused on the 78th Guards and captured the "Poliana" State Farm at the boundary of the 24th and 25th Guards Corps. The fighting for this point, Gremiachii and the Machine Tractor Station went on through the morning with all three changing hands several times.

At 1300 hours a further strong attack by the 106th Infantry toward the "Poliana" State Farm began, involving up to a regiment of infantry and 17 tanks. The 2nd Battalion of the 211th Guards Regiment, suffering significant losses and unable to withstand the attack of superior forces, began retreating in the direction of Churayevo, 4 km to the southeast and exposing the flank of the 78th Guards' 225th Guards Regiment. In order to restore the position General Safiulin personally assembled the 1st and 3rd Battalions of the 211th Guards, the 225th Guards Regiment and a battalion of the 213th Rifle Division and launched a counterattack at about 1600 hours toward Gremiachii and the Machine Tractor Station, with fire support from the 201st Tanks and the 1529th SU Regiment. After a 10-minute artillery preparation and an hour of close-in combat this grouping retook what remained of the hamlet. Having brought up reserves the 106th Infantry returned to the attack but failed to recapture this position. Over the course of July 7 the 73rd Guards lost 142 men killed and a further 832 wounded.

In the German planning for the following day the III Panzer Corps was to exploit the break between the 81st Guards, which was now partly encircled, and the 73rd Guards by driving north towards the 4th Panzer Army. To this end the 7th Panzer was to maintain an active defense along the fronts of the 73rd and 94th Guards. While on the Soviet side considerable effort went into a plan of counterattack by most of 7th Guards Army this was largely overtaken by events. At midnight Colonel Kozak reported:

At 1030, the 214th Guards Rifle Regiment with the 30th Destroyer Anti-tank Brigade and the 131st Anti-Tank Rifle Battalion went on the counterattack in the direction of the "Batratskaia Dacha" State Farm and the wood 2.5 kilometres southwest of the State Farm. As a result of six hours of fighting, 1/214th Guards Rifle Regiment... advanced to the north as far as the pond on the "Batratskaia Dacha" State Farm... Lacking the support of neighbors and met by powerful enemy artillery and mortar fire, the battalions, suffering significant losses in men, were forced to halt the attack... In the course of the day, units of the 214th Guards Rifle Regiment destroyed two tanks and killed up to 200 enemy men. Losses... 81 men killed or wounded... At 1000 following a barrage... the enemy launched a counterattack... against the area of defense occupied by 1/209th Guards Rifle Regiment. However, greeted by heavy fire, the enemy was thrown back to the "Poliana" State Farm.

While the division had regained little ground through the day it had effectively tied down the 7th Panzer and 106th Infantry. On the other hand its morale was being impacted by the continuous combat; over July 7 and 8 the blocking detachments of the 92nd NKVD Rifle Regiment reported having detained 332 men of the division.

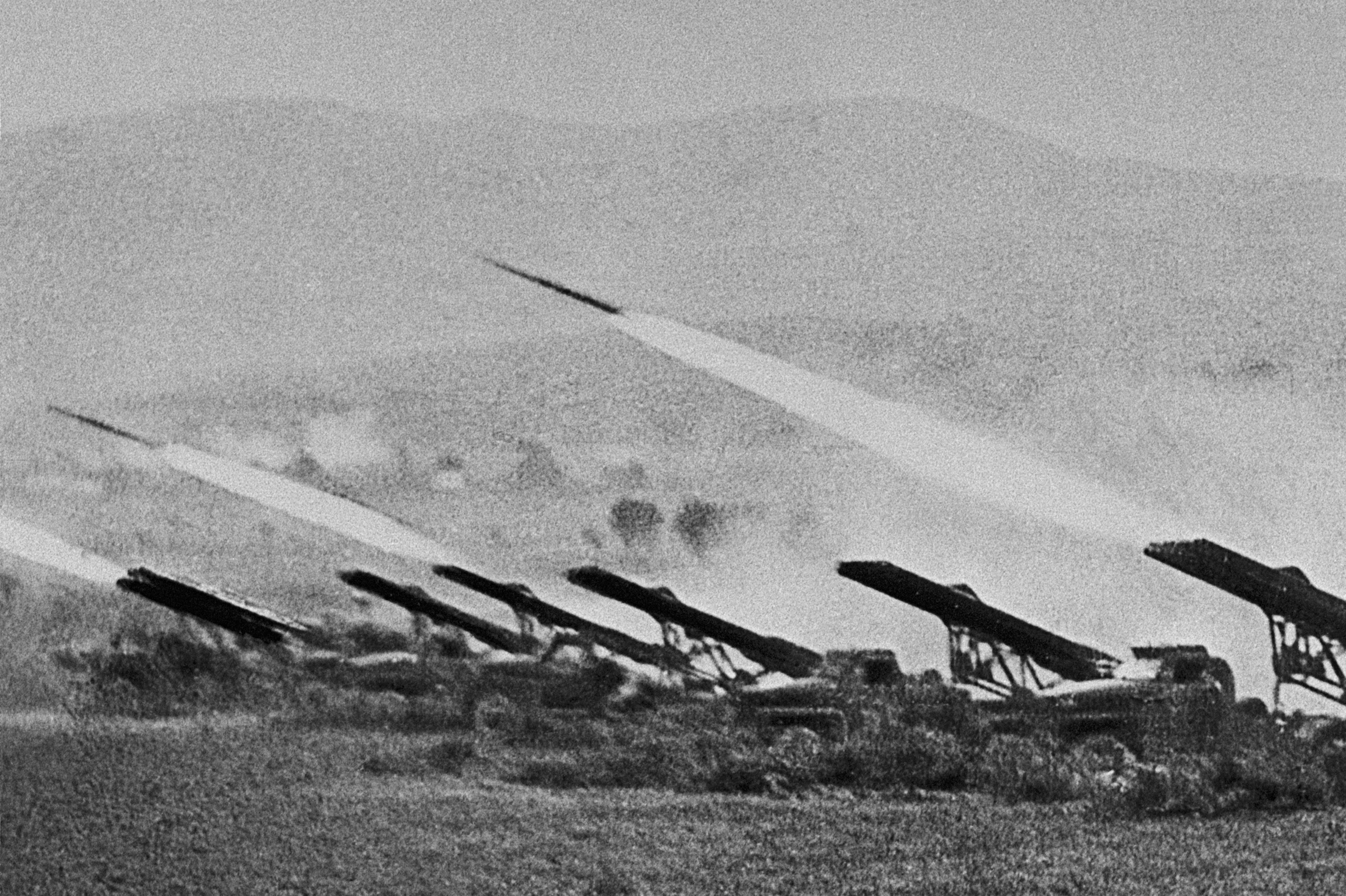
A battery of M-13 Katyusha launchers firing at enemy targets, 1943

On the morning of July 9 the strength return of the division showed 5,985 men present. As the III Panzer Corps ground northward toward Melikhovo that day the division remained in its flank guard role; it was now being supported by the 15th Guards Rifle Division which had been allocated to 25th Guards Corps. In the afternoon of July 10 this division moved into the Corps' first echelon of defense. At about the same time 78th Guards began a further effort to retake the two state farms which soon ran into trouble due to heavy German fire. The commander of the 15th Guards ordered two battalions of his 44th Guards Regiment to attack towards the farms. The attack began well, catching units of the 7th Panzer during a redeployment. In the course of an hour the 44th Guards pushed the German grenadiers back 300-500m into the depths of the "Batratskaia Dacha" State Farm before they began to offer strong fire resistance. To prevent the attack from bogging down it was reinforced with the 214th Guards Regiment while General Safiulin ordered the 97th Guards Mortar Regiment to support it with rocket fire. At 1855 hours five launchers fired a salvo of 78 M-13 (4.9 kg of high explosive each) at a concentration of German infantry and armor in the area of the woods 1,000m west of "Batratskaia Dacha" Farm which "blanketed" the target. While the weakened 214th Guards was unable to make headway the 44th Guards had advanced 1.5 km by day's end, reaching the western outskirts of the State Farm but unable to take it completely. The 214th Guards reported 78 men killed or wounded, two heavy machine guns destroyed and 4 horses killed.

During July 12 General Shumilov sought to distract Kempf's forces from their mission by launching counterattacks towards his forward supply base at Krutoi Log. The main attack was to come from 7th Guards Army's right wing consisting of the 73rd Guards and 270th Rifle Divisions backed by the 201st Tank Brigade and artillery reinforcements. Overnight the division reported 4,593 men available for duty, 48.6 percent of authorized strength (2,051 riflemen and sappers; 1,547 artillerymen; remainder service personnel). These were armed with 194 light and 52 heavy machine guns; 67 mortars; 14 antitank guns; 10 regimental guns; plus 12 76mm cannon and 10 122mm howitzers in the 153rd Guards Artillery Regiment. The first attack by the 73rd and 15th Guards against elements of the 198th Infantry Division was halted in its tracks by 1040 hours with the 73rd Guards suffering particularly heavy casualties while gaining about 400m of ground. In the afternoon it resumed its attack jointly with the 213th Rifle Division and advanced a further 2.5 km. The 209th Guards Regiment crossed the road between "Batratskaia Dacha" State Farm and the Gremiachii Machine Tractor Station before bursting into the woods 2 km northeast of Krutoi Log where it remained in heavy combat until after dark. Colonel Kozak reported losses of 840 men killed or wounded during the day. This day also marked the end of the end of the German offensive, with Hitler ordering its suspension during the evening.

== Into Ukraine ==
By the beginning of August, in preparation for the strategic offensive into Ukraine, the 7th Guards Army was transferred to Steppe Front; the 73rd Guards remained in 25th Guards Corps. A month later the division was in the Front reserves, assigned to the 76th Rifle Corps but as it advanced toward the Dniepr River during the Poltava-Kremenchug Offensive in September it returned to 7th Guards, now in the 24th Guards Corps. On the night of September 24 advance elements of the division reached the Dniepr and immediately began crossing using improvised means. Colonel Kozak soon arrived to take direct command of the operation and over the following six hours was able to get most of the rest of his division across, ensuring the bridgehead against counterattacks. He then ordered a maneuver which took the German forces by surprise, liberating the villages of Borodaevka and Proletarka and causing significant casualties. Over the following days the bridgehead was expanded and although Kozak was wounded on October 9 he continued in his post, leading by his personal example. He was promoted to the rank of major general on October 25 and the next day was made a Hero of the Soviet Union.

=== Kirovograd and Krivoi Rog ===
By now Steppe Front had been renamed 2nd Ukrainian Front and by the beginning of November the 73rd Guards had returned to the 25th Guards Corps, still in 7th Guards Army. On November 13 the Front gained small bridgeheads on both sides of Cherkassy and quickly expanded the northern one until it threatened to engulf the city and tear open the front of the German 8th Army. Through most of December and into January, 1944 the Front was generally engaged in attrition battles. During December the division was transferred to the 64th Rifle Corps of the 57th Army; it would remain under these commands for the duration of the war, apart from one brief reassignment in late August, 1944. On December 24 Kozak left the division to Col. Nikolai Dmitrievich Beregovoi in order to take command of the 75th Rifle Corps, but he returned on January 22, 1944.

At the start of the Nikopol–Krivoi Rog Offensive on January 30 the 57th Army was located north-northeast of Krivoi Rog facing the LVII Panzer Corps but played a secondary role in this operation which lasted until the end of February. During its course the Army was transferred to 3rd Ukrainian Front, where it would remain for the duration. At the start of April it was recorded that 95 percent of the personnel of the 73rd Guards were of Ukrainian nationality.

=== First Jassy-Kishinev Offensive ===
On March 26 the Front began a new offensive in the southern sector of western Ukraine. While its left-wing armies struck in the direction of Odessa, the 57th, 37th and 46th Armies on its right wing advanced toward the Dniestr River and the border with Romania. At this time the 64th Corps contained the 73rd Guards with the 19th and 52nd Rifle Divisions and was commanded by Maj. Gen. M. B. Anashkin. By early on April 11 these armies were pursuing disorganized German forces on the approaches to the east bank of the Dniestr, intending to force the river between April 18–20. During the day the 57th Army covered about 18 km with the 64th Corps deployed in the center, passing through Mălăiești toward Crasnogorca, 16 km south of Tașlîc.

The Front commander, Army Gen. R. Ya. Malinovskii, had assigned 57th Army a 20 km-wide sector of the Dniestr from Butor south to opposite Varnița. On this sector the river made a wide U-shaped bend to the west with Butor and Crasnogorca on either side of its entrance. German forces were defending this "bottleneck" as well as the west bank south of Crasnogorca. The terrain on the east bank was generally low, flat and free of obstacles; the west bank was similar north and south of the bend but then rose to about 125m height about 3 km from the riverbank and much closer directly west of the bend in the vicinity of the village of Talița. The Army's 68th Rifle Corps arrived at the east bank at midday on April 12 and immediately began crossing with improvised means near Butor after overcoming weak outposts of the German 320th Infantry Division.

Meanwhile the 64th Corps was approaching Crasnogorca, which was defended by two Division Groups of Corps Detachment "A", with orders to seize bridgeheads near or north of that place. The 73rd Guards was leading its Corps and first cleared rearguards from Mălăiești late on April 11. Moving west through the dark the 211th Guards Regiment captured the northern portion of Crasnogorca at first light. Elements of the 214th Guards Regiment then advanced southward about 5 km and took the village of Băcioc while a special advance detachment of the division crossed the river north of Crasnogorca on makeshift rafts and captured a small bridgehead. However, intense German artillery, mortar and machine gun fire prevented both regiments from reinforcing this lodgement. While this fighting raged the 52nd Rifle Division forced another crossing south of Gura Bîcului and by nightfall General Anashkin had ordered both of Kozak's regiments to reinforce this new bridgehead. While this movement was successful it proved impossible to expand the bridgehead, again due to heavy fire, particularly from artillery on the heights to the west. Kozak was also directed to reinforce the 19th Rifle Division with his 209th Guards Regiment as part of an effort to break into the river bend, but the German defenses of the "bottleneck" were not overcome until April 16. 57th Army's 9th Rifle Corps to the south also failed to gain more than minor footholds over the Dniestr. By April 14 it was clear that Malinovskii's objectives would not be met and he ordered the Army to go over to the defense.

=== Second Jassy-Kishinev Offensive ===
Over the next four months the 57th Army was shifted south, taking up positions north and south of Tiraspol. In the planning for the offensive that was to drive Romania out of the Axis in August it was assigned a 14 km-wide attack zone and a 4 km sector for launching its main attack, facing elements of the German XXX Army Corps. The main attack sector was centered on the village of Chircăiești on the west bank and the Army was deployed with the 68th Corps in first echelon. The 9th Corps would be committed on the second day and by the following day these Corps were to reach the Balmaz area. 64th Corps, comprising the same divisions as in April, was the Army's third echelon and reserve.

The offensive began on August 20 but 57th Army's initial progress was not as great as planned. On August 21 the 68th Corps was still being held up by the 15th Infantry and the left flank of the 257th Infantry Division and only began to advance at 1920 hours following an artillery and aviation preparation. Meanwhile, the 64th Corps remained east of the Dniestr in its positions north of Tiraspol. During the next day the Front made much more substantial progress and at 0400 hours on August 23 the 64th Corps was transferred to the 37th Army, which had been the Front's main shock group from the outset. The 19th and 56th Divisions were to be committed along the main axis of attack while the 73rd Guards was retained in Army reserve in the Bakhmutka tributary of the Cogâlnic area. By this point in the campaign the Axis forces were in full retreat with a large grouping encircled in the Chișinău region.

During August 25 this grouping operated against 37th Army in an effort to break the encirclement. Through the morning the 19th and 56th Divisions were brought up to the front by motor transport but the 73rd Guards remained in reserve in the Hîrtop area and to the west. The next day the division was committed towards the front with two rifle regiments concentrating in a ravine 2 km west of Caracui while the third moved to the Fund Saretsina - Troițcoe area. By the end of August 27 it was along a line from Cărpineni to Horjești; by now the Chișinău grouping had been reduced to remnants and largely destroyed.

== Into the Balkans ==
Within days the 64th Corps returned to the command of 57th Army. After advancing through southern Romania in early September the Army crossed the Bulgarian border on September 8, the day that country declared war on Germany. 57th Army moved west, south of the Danube, linking to the mobilizing Bulgarian armies to its south, approaching the border of Yugoslavia by September 19 and crossing the river into the bend west of Turnu Severin on the 22nd. The German Army Group F sent the 1st Mountain Division to oppose this move but it could only impose a delay. On October 4 Soviet forces reached Pančevo on the north bank of the Danube 16 km downstream from Belgrade and on the 8th the railroad running into the city from the south was cut. On the night of October 14 a combined force of Soviet troops and Yugoslav partisans entered Belgrade and took the city center by the next afternoon. On November 14 the 73rd Guards would be awarded the Order of the Red Banner for its part in the fighting for the Yugoslav capital, while the 214th Guards Regiment was decorated with the Order of Bogdan Khmelnitski, 2nd Degree.

=== Hungarian Operations ===
Later in October the 3rd Ukrainian Front crossed the Sava River and by the end of the month reached the Ruma area, 60 km northwest of Belgrade. In the 64th Corps the 56th Division had been replaced by the 236th Rifle Division; the 73rd Guards was fighting along a line from Hrtkovci to Progar. From October 31 to November 9 the 64th Corps concentrated in the area from Sombor to Srpski Miletić in preparation for another crossing of the Danube. General Kozak organized a feint, giving the appearance of a crossing at one point while the actual crossing took place on another sector. The division got over in a swift dash on November 14 with the help of the Danube Flotilla, rapidly expanded its lodgement and dug in, holding off several counterattacks over the following days. The fighting went on until December 4 and during this period the 73rd Guards liberated seven large settlements, killed or wounded 3,989 Axis soldiers and officers, destroyed 17 guns, 34 mortars and 136 machine guns, and captured 28 prisoners, 19 mortars and 74 machine guns. In recognition of this success the division was granted the honorific "Danube" and Kozak was made a Hero of the Soviet Union for the second time on April 28, 1945. In addition, on January 6 the 209th and 211th Guards Rifle Regiments would each receive the Order of Bogdan Khmelnitski, 2nd Degree while the 153rd Guards Artillery Regiment was awarded the Order of Kutuzov, 3rd Degree, for their roles in this operation.

Following this victory Marshal Malinovskii ordered his Front to advance northward to capture Nagykanizsa and Székesfehérvár with the goal of encircling the Axis' Budapest group of forces from the west. The forces in front of 57th Army withdrew under cover of strong rearguards, mined roads and other obstacles. 64th Corps was directed to bypass Szigetvár to cut the town off from the north. Overall during December 5–6 the Front advanced from 5 km to 25 km. During the following day Axis resistance increased significantly in face of the threat to the oil-production facilities around Nagykanizsa; 64th Corps managed to cover another 10 km. On December 8 efforts by 57th and 4th Guards Armies to take Székesfehérvár and break the "Margarita Line" from the march failed. The 73rd Guards and 19th Rifle Divisions repelled five counterattacks by up to a battalion each and were fighting along the eastern outskirts of Lábod. During this fighting the commander of the 19th, Maj. Gen. P. E. Lazarev was killed by enemy artillery. In that division's after-action report the 73rd Guards was blamed for the failure of the assault on Lábod due to the slowness of its supporting attack on the left flank.

At this point the Army was facing the Hungarian Szent László Infantry Division and 3rd Cavalry Brigade, as well as the German Brandenburg Division and 13th SS Mountain Division Handschar. The Corps made minor advances over the next two weeks while the 46th and 4th Guards Armies prepared for a new drive on December 20 to penetrate the "Margarita Line" and continue the advance on Budapest. 57th Army was ordered to remain on the defensive in order to cover the flank of this drive. The Corps now included the 73rd Guards, 10th Guards Airborne and 299th Rifle Divisions.

Budapest was surrounded by December 26 and on January 1, 1945 the German Army Group South began relief operations which continued for most of the month, but these did not directly affect the 64th Corps. During Operation Spring Awakening, which began on March 6, the 2nd Panzer Army made little progress against 57th Army before the Soviet forces went over to the counterattack. On March 12 General Kozak left the division to take command of the 21st Guards Rifle Corps and was replaced by Col. Vasilii Ivanovich Shcherbenko, who would lead the 73rd Guards until its disbandment. Beginning on March 26 the 57th Army made the main offensive drive in the Nagykanizsa–Körmend Offensive, in the course of which the 211th Guards Regiment distinguished itself in the fighting for Nagykanizsa and on April 26 was awarded the Order of Aleksandr Nevsky. The division ended the war advancing into western Austria.

== Postwar ==
When the fighting ended the men and women of the division shared the full title of 73rd Guards Rifle, Stalingrad-Danube, Order of the Red Banner Division. (Russian: 73-я гвардейская стрелковая Сталинградско-Дунайская Краснознамённая дивизия.) Along with the rest of 57th Army it became part of the Southern Group of Forces in June and was stationed in Romania. It was disbanded in June 1946, as the 57th was being converted to the 9th Mechanized Army.
