= 15th Guards Rifle Division =

- Active: 1942–1965
- Country: Soviet Union
- Branch: Red Army; Soviet Army
- Type: Division
- Role: Infantry
- Engagements: World War II; Mius-Front; Battle of Stalingrad; Operation Uranus; Operation Ring; Battle of Kursk; Belgorod-Kharkov Offensive Operation; Battle of the Dniepr; Nikopol-Krivoi Rog Offensive; First Jassy–Kishinev Offensive; Lvov–Sandomierz Offensive; Vistula-Oder Offensive; Lower Silesian Offensive; Upper Silesian Offensive; Battle of Berlin; Battle of the Oder–Neisse; Spremberg–Torgau Offensive Operation; Prague Offensive
- Decorations: Order of Lenin; Order of the Red Banner (2); Order of Suvorov; Order of Kutuzov
- Battle honours: Kharkov; Prague

Commanders
- Notable commanders: Lt. Col. Pyotr Dmitrievich Kondratev; Maj. Gen. Emelyan Ivanovich Vasilenko; Maj. Gen. Pyotr Mikhailovich Chirkov

The 15th Guards Rifle Division was reformed as an elite infantry division of the Red Army in February, 1942, based on the 1st formation of the 136th Rifle Division, and served in that role until well after the end of the Great Patriotic War. The division had already distinguished itself during the Winter War with Finland in 1940 and had been decorated with the Order of Lenin; soon after its redesignation it also received its first Order of the Red Banner. It was in Southern Front as this time but was soon moved to the Reserve of the Supreme High Command where it was assigned to 7th Reserve Army in May, then to 28th Army in Southwestern Front in June, then to 57th Army in Stalingrad Front in July. It remained in that Army for the rest of the year, with one brief exception, until it was transferred to Don Front's 64th Army in January, 1943 during the closing stages of the battle of Stalingrad. In March this Army became 7th Guards Army and was railed to the northwest, joining Voronezh Front south of the Kursk salient. In the battle that followed the 15th Guards assisted in the defeat of Army Detachment Kempf, then took part in the summer offensive into Ukraine, winning one of the first battle honors at Kharkov. It remained in either 7th Guards or 37th Army into the spring of 1944. It saw action in the Nikopol-Krivoi Rog Offensive and was awarded the Order of Suvorov before being involved in the frustrating battles along the Dniestr River on the Romanian border. In June the division became part of 34th Guards Rifle Corps in 5th Guards Army and was redeployed north becoming part of 1st Ukrainian Front and taking part in the Lvov–Sandomierz Offensive into Poland. The 15th Guards made a spectacular advance across Poland during the Vistula-Oder Offensive and was further decorated with the Order of Kutuzov for forcing a crossing of the Oder River. It then saw action in the drive on Berlin in April and the Prague Offensive in May, winning a further battle honor and an unusual second Order of the Red Banner in the process. After the war the division did garrison duty in Austria, then in Ukraine, followed by a move in late 1947 to Crimea and the Kuban where its personnel assisted in rebuilding the local economy and infrastructure for nearly 20 years. It September 1965 it was renumbered as the "51st" and became the 2nd formation of the 51st Guards Motor Rifle Division.

== Formation ==
The division was officially raised to Guards status on February 16, 1942 in recognition of its role in the first liberation of Rostov-on-Don on December 2, 1941 and its subsequent attacks across the Mius River. Its sub-units would not receive their Guards redesignations until some time later. It inherited the Order of Lenin the 136th had earned in March, 1940. Its order of battle, based on the last peacetime shtat (table of organization and equipment) for rifle divisions, was eventually as follows:

- 44th Guards Rifle Regiment (from 378th Rifle Regiment)
- 47th Guards Rifle Regiment (from 541st Rifle Regiment)
- 50th Guards Rifle Regiment (from 733rd Rifle Regiment)
- 43rd Guards Artillery Regiment (from 291st Artillery Regiment)
- 20th Guards Antitank Battalion
- 18th Guards Antiaircraft Battery (until May 1, 1943)
- 27th Guards Mortar Battalion (until October 20, 1942)
- 17th Guards Reconnaissance Company
- 11th Guards Sapper Battalion (from 42nd Sapper Battalion)
- 25th Guards Signal Battalion
- 16th Guards Medical/Sanitation Battalion
- 19th Guards Chemical Defense (Anti-gas) Company
- 13th Guards Motor Transport Company (later 220th Motor Transport Battalion)
- 4th Guards Field Bakery
- 12th Guards Divisional Veterinary Hospital
- 112th Field Postal Station
- 368th Field Office of the State Bank

The 136th had been under command of Col. Nikolai Porfirevich Raevsky but he was replaced on the day of redesignation by Lt. Col. Pyotr Dmitrievich Kondratev. At this time it was in the 18th Army of Southern Front. On March 27 the division was further recognized for its service in the Donbas and along the Mius with the award of its first Order of the Red Banner.

== Operation Blue ==
In April the 15th Guards was moved to the 58th Army in the Reserve of the Supreme High Command. By the start of the German summer offensive in the Caucasus in late June it had been assigned to 28th Army in Southwestern Front and was directly facing the 164 tanks fielded by 3rd Panzer Division of German 6th Army's XXXX Panzer Corps. The five rifle divisions of 28th Army were deployed in a single echelon with three tank brigades (numbering in total about 90 tanks) and the 244th Rifle Division near Valuyki on the Oskol River as Southwestern Front's reserve. Under the weight of the attack which began on June 30 the division, along with the 13th Guards and 169th Rifle Divisions, backed by 13th Tank Corps, managed to hold the advance of the XXXX Panzer to less than 10km on the first day. However the German XXIX and VIII Army Corps to the north struck more than twice that distance, tearing a yawning gap between 28th and 21st Army. Over the coming days 28th was forced to fall back towards Valuyki, exposing the flank of the 21st to its north. By July 10 the situation had drastically deteriorated and the 28th Army headquarters was forced to report:

We have no communications with the units of the army... By the day's end on 9 July... 15th Guards Rifle Division was fighting encircled in the Maliarov region (northeast of Rovenki)... At the present time, the exact locations of the divisions are unknown; but it is most likely that the divisions no longer exist as organized formations and their encircled remnants are fighting their way eastward toward the Don River crossings.

Over the next three days the Army reported that elements of the divisions made it back safely. However by this time they mustered only 40 to 400 "bayonets" (riflemen and sappers) each, with only a handful of guns and mortars. Within days the 28th and its depleted units were transferred to the new Stalingrad Front.

=== Battle of Stalingrad ===
Later that month the 15th Guards was transferred to the 57th Army, commanded by Maj. Gen. F. I. Tolbukhin, still in Stalingrad Front. This Army at the time was very small, consisting of the worn-down 15th, the 38th Rifle Division and the 13th Separate Destroyer (antitank) Brigade. It constituted the Front's reserve and was located in Stalingrad itself but on August 1 as 4th Panzer Army advanced from the southwest towards the city it was ordered to new defensive positions to the south with the division watching a line from Lake Sarpa to Raygorod on the Volga. The following day Lt. Colonel Kondratev handed the command of the division over to his chief of staff, Lt. Col. Andrei Evtikhievich Ovsienko. Under the crisis conditions on August 5 the STAVKA ordered new command arrangements including assigning 15th Guards to 64th Army in the re-created Southwestern Front. On August 9 the division took part in counterattack against XXXXVIII Panzer Corps north and south of Tinguta which struck the 14th Panzer and 29th Panzergrenadier Divisions almost simultaneously from three sides, much to their surprise. During a two-day battle the panzer troops lost heavily and were forced to retreat towards Abganerovo, bringing 4th Panzer Army's advance to a halt and a near collapse.

Within days the 15th Guards returned to 57th Army which was now substantially reinforced with four more rifle divisions (not including the 38th which remained in 64th Army) and several other units. The Army was assigned the task of defending a 70 km-wide sector from State Farm (Sovkhoz) No. 4 (4 km east of Tinguta) and State Farm "Privolzhsky" to Raygorod to prevent the Axis forces from penetrating to Stalingrad from the south. 4th Panzer Army renewed its advance on August 20; by now the substantially rebuilt division was in the Army's first echelon with the 36th Guards Rifle Division. Initially the main attack was against 64th Army which was forced back but was still putting up heavy resistance. As a result, on the next day the 14th Panzer shifted to the east the next day, crossed the Malaya Tinguta River and pushed about 4 km to the north, driving a wedge between 64th Army's 38th Division and the 15th Guards. At the same time the 24th Panzer Division struck the center of the division's defenses at the "Privolzhsky" State Farm and crossed the river farther east. With the assistance of a rifle regiment of the Vinnitsa Infantry School the division managed to withdraw 10 km to take up new defenses stretching westward along the Dubovyi and Morozov ravines from the northwest bank of Lake Sarpa to 74 km Station. As 24th Panzer wheeled to the east towards Tundutovo Station, General Tolbukhin reinforced the division with the fresh 422nd Rifle Division. Between them they brought the German advance to a halt. Despite this stout defense by the evening of August 21 the XXXXVIII Panzer Corps had carved a wedge 15 km wide and 20 km deep between 64th and 57th Armies and threatened to encircle the former from the east. Therefore Southwestern Front sent six antitank artillery regiments to the two Armies, with one to be allocated to each of the front-line divisions.

On August 23–24, 4th Panzer Army again regrouped, lunging northwards early on the 25th along the boundary of the 422nd and the 244th Rifle Divisions and advancing 8 km to the Chervlennaia River. Once there, however, concentrated artillery and mortar fire of the two divisions, joined by 15th Guards coming up from second echelon, separated the German tanks from their infantry, while heavy antitank fire and counterattacks by 6th Tank Brigade destroyed or damaged many panzers. The remainder had no choice but to fall back to their jumping-off positions by the end of August 26. On September 8 Lt. Colonel Ovsienko returned to his chief of staff duties and the division came under the command of Col. Nikolai Ivanovich Telegin. The German 6th and 4th Panzer Armies completed the isolation of 62nd Army in the city by September 12 at which time the 64th and 57th occupied the Beketovka "bridgehead" along the Volga directly to its south with the 57th southwest of Ivanovka - Tundutovo - the Dubovyi ravine, facing elements of Romanian VI Army Corps.

As the battle raged within Stalingrad during late September and early October the STAVKA planned attacks to its north and south to divert German strength and possibly relieve the siege. A composite detachment made up of two detached rifle regiments (from 422nd and 75th Rifle Divisions) and the 155th Tank Brigade, supported by 1188th Antitank Artillery Regiment plus 18th and 76th Guards Mortar Regiments, was in the sector of the 15th Guards, which was also instructed to provide fire support. This detachment assaulted the positions of the Romanian 1st Infantry Division south of Lake Sarpa overnight on September 28/29. The attack achieved almost immediate success, penetrating the Romanian defenses, advancing roughly 5 km, and liberating the villages of Tsatsa and Semkin by 1400 hours on October 1. As a result of this attack, as well as a similar one by 51st Army, the Romanian VI Army Corps was badly damaged and forced back to even less defensible positions. 15th Guards exploited the victory by capturing the Dubovyi ravine region by the same hour and dug in.

Through October a sergeant of the 50th Guards Regiment, Nikolai Yakovlevich Ilyin, continued to build on his already established reputation as an effective sniper. On October 16, as a reward for his skills he was given the use of the sniper rifle that had been used by the late Hero of the Soviet Union Khusen Borezhevich Andrukhaev, who had served in the 733rd Regiment of the 136th Rifle Division. From October 18 to November 1, fighting mostly in the area of the Dubovyi ravine, Ilyin was credited with 95 kills of Axis soldiers and officers. As the battle continued he increased his count to 216 by February 1943 and was awarded the Order of the Red Banner and shortly thereafter was also made a Hero of the Soviet Union. Ilyin was killed by enemy machine gun fire on August 4 after accounting for a total of 494 enemy soldiers, making him the sixth-highest scoring Soviet sniper of the war.

=== Operation Uranus ===
On October 18 Colonel Telegin was replaced by Maj. Gen. Emelyan Ivanovich Vasilenko, who had previously commanded the 136th Rifle Division in 1941. In the buildup to the Soviet counteroffensive the division was transferred to the 51st Army just to the south of the 57th. It began its attack from the Shalimovo region south of Lake Sarpa promptly at 0830 hours on November 20 with tank support and easily penetrated the defenses of Romanian 18th Infantry Division's two defending battalions, sending the survivors scurrying westward and northwestward. Wheeling in the latter direction the guardsmen and tanks advanced up to 11 km by 1800 hours against virtually no opposition and linked up with 57th Army's 143rd Rifle Brigade near the village of Kamensky. This left much of the Romanian 2nd Infantry and about half of 18th Infantry Division encircled and the 15th Guards reported capturing 2,500 men, 500 rifles, 50 machine guns, 15 guns, 13 mortars and other equipment by the end of the day. The encircled force surrendered overnight and left the remainder of the two divisions in a shambles with no further effective combat power.

The division spent the morning of November 21 mopping up the encirclement area then reassembled about 12 km southwest of Lake Sarpa before wheeling westward along the route of the 4th Mechanized Corps. This Corps had a shaky start the first day, but made spectacular progress on the second and by day's end had surrounded the remnants of the two Romanian divisions in cooperation with the 15th Guards and 143rd Brigade. This advance also overran most of the Romanian logistic installations north of the Aksai River. On November 23 one of the main tasks for 51st Army was to move the 4th Mechanized northwestward to the Sovetskii region to link up with Southwestern Front's mobile groups. A battalion of the Corps' 59th Mechanized Brigade became involved in heavy fighting on the outskirts of Karpovka which was resolved with the arrival of the division in the evening, as recorded in its history:

At first light on 23 November, 15th Guards Rifle Division received the mission -- to cut the Stalingrad-Sovetskii railroad line, capture Karpovskaia Station and the villages of Karpovka and Novyi Rogachik, occupy a defense along the line of these points, and prevent an enemy penetration toward the south and southwest. The division fulfilled there [sic] missions brilliantly. Not a single Hitlerite penetrated through its combat formations.

Other Soviet sources state that the division and the mechanized battalion were forced to abandon Karpovka and Karpovskaia Station due to counterattacks by elements of 29th Panzergrenadier Division during the evening and gradually fall back to positions south of the rail line by nightfall on the 24th.

By this time the encirclement of the German forces at Stalingrad had been completed. 51st Army was in the difficult position of conducting operations along both the inner and outer encirclement fronts. The division, on the inner front with 4th Mechanized, was fighting for the Marinovka and Voroshilov Camp regions southwest of the pocket. The 4th Mechanized was attempting to encircle and destroy Battlegroup "Willig" of the 3rd Panzergrenadier Division defending the fortified strongpoint at Marinovka. 15th Guards entered the battle by attacking the sector between Marinovka and Voroshilov but in two days of fighting the Soviet forces were unable to pry their opponents out of their positions. On November 25 the division was transferred back to 57th Army and continued to conduct probing attacks against the German battlegroups defending the rail line and the road between the two strongpoints, with no success. In the following days the situation stabilized.

=== Operation Ring ===
During the first half of December the situation around Stalingrad was dominated by Army Group Don's attempted relief offensive and a proposed effort, Operation Donnerschlag, by the trapped 6th Army to break out. Among the moves made by Don Front to counter the latter the 235th Separate Tank Brigade and 234th Separate Tank Regiment were brought up to support the 15th Guards' positions south of Karpovka on December 20.

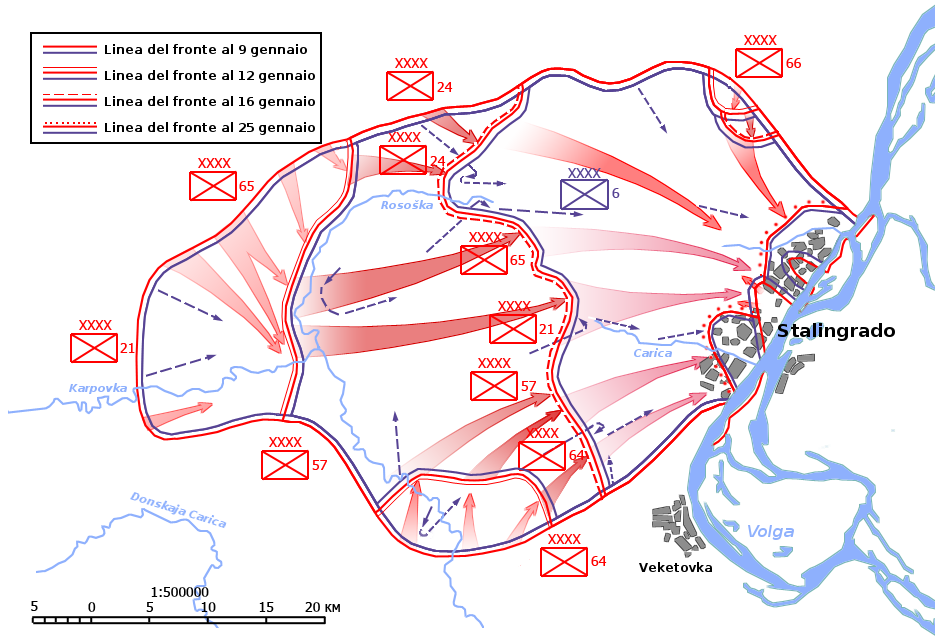
Operation Ring

Operation Koltso began on January 10, 1943 and on that first day the division, deployed on 57th Army's left flank, seized the first line trenches of the German 376th Infantry Division and followed this on the 13th with a general assault with the 50th and 44th Guards Regiments in the 4 km-wide sector between Staryi Rogachik and Bereslavsky Farm. Attacking eastward the two regiments punched gaping holes through the 376th's defenses and advanced up to 6 km, capturing both positions and reaching the Chervlenaia River. In the process one German battalion was encircled and destroyed in Staryi Rogachik and four more were forced across the river in considerable disorder. By the day's end the remnants of the German division were caught in a large pincer between the 422nd Rifle, 15th Guards and the 120th Rifle Division of the adjacent 21st Army. The attack continued on January 14 and the division, which was already over the Chervlenaia, advanced eastward, captured Peschanyi Karer and reached the railroad 2 km west-northwest of Basargino. By the end of the day the three Soviet divisions had trapped the 376th in the region southwest of Basargino which prompted Army Group Don to note late that evening that "376th ID seems to have been broken up." Overnight the remaining men of the division died in place, surrendered or disappeared into the darkness.

After a pause, Operation Ring resumed on January 18. North of the railroad the 15th Guards shattered the defenses of the escaped remnants of the 376th, by now little more than a reinforced battalion, and took Hill 155.0, 2.5 km northwest of Alekseevka. On January 23 the 422nd and 38th Rifle and 15th Guards advanced east up to 6 km on both sides of the railway, further shattering the 297th Infantry Division and the Romanian 82nd Infantry Regiment. The Soviet force reached positions extending from Poliakovka on the upper Tsaritsa River southeastwards to the western outskirts of Verkhniaia Elshanka. Two days later the three Soviet divisions continued to cooperate in thrusting eastward along the railway into the southern part of the city and seizing Railroad Station No. 2, then wheeling north in pursuit of the withdrawing remnants of IV Army Corps. This advance cut off most of the 297th Infantry leading its commander to seek terms of surrender and by nightfall the 38th Division had him and most of his men in custody.

From January 28–31 the 15th Guards took part in the liquidation of the remaining Axis forces in downtown Stalingrad. On the first day it attacked northward across the Tsaritsa west of the railroad bridge with 38th Division and 143rd Rifle Brigade. In the process they captured the ruins of two hospitals forcing the defending 44th and 371st Infantry Divisions to withdraw up to 1,000m. 15th Guards encircled and seized Hospital No. 1 which included the headquarters of 44th Infantry and captured its commander, Lt. Gen. H.-A. Deboi with several hundred of his men. Attacking abreast from positions from Novoriadskaia Street eastward along Golubinskaia Street to the railroad at Krasnoznamenskaia Street on January 29 along converging axes the 15th Guards, 38th and 422nd Divisions and 143rd Brigade advanced up to 800m and reached positions from Salskaia to the vicinity of Railroad Station No. 1. Collectively during the day the advances of 57th, 64th and 21st Armies broke the back of resistance in 6th Army's southern pocket. The STAVKA was confident enough of the outcome that it released the 57th's headquarters and attached forces to the Reserve to be redeployed to the northwest, while 15th Guards and the remaining units were reassigned to 64th Army.

During January 30 and 31 the division was involved in what was effectively mopping-up operations in the city's center. In the immediate wake of the 6th Army's surrender on February 2 the 64th Army was ordered to begin moving north to the Livny region, but this was revoked the next day when the 65th Army was substituted for this deployment. 64th Army was retained at Stalingrad as part of Maj. Gen. N. I. Trufanov's operational group of forces and later the Stalingrad Group of Forces, rebuilding and retraining but also continuing to dig out German die-hards. At 1700 hours on February 28 the STAVKA ordered as follows:

1. Re-station the 64th Army, consisting of six rifle divisions (the 15th Gds., 36th Gds., 29th, 38th, 204th and 422nd) [and support units], to the Valuyki region at the disposition of the commander of Voronezh Front. 2. Carry out the re-stationing by railroad. The beginning of the dispatch will be on 1 March of this year. Complete the transfer of the army to the new stationing region by 15 March of this year. 3. Carry out the filling out of all rifle divisions with personnel, horses, weapons, and equipment in the new stationing region... bringing the strength of each rifle division, including guards, up to 8,000 men.

On April 16, 64th Army became the 7th Guards Army. At that time the 15th Guards' personnel were noted as being about 50 percent Russian and 50 percent Tajik and other central Asian nationalities.

== Battle of Kursk ==
By the middle of May the division had been assigned to the new 24th Guards Rifle Corps with the 36th Guards and 72nd Guards (former 29th) Rifle Divisions. The left flank of 7th Guards Army was the boundary between Voronezh and Southwestern Fronts and 24th Guards Corps was on its Army's left (south) flank. As of July 5 the 15th Guards had a total of 8,684 personnel (832 officers, 2,462, NCOs and 5,390 enlisted) plus 996 horses. For small arms it was armed with 3,778 bolt-action and semi-automatic rifles, 2,408 sub-machine guns, 420 light, 140 heavy and 5 antiaircraft machine guns and 252 antitank rifles. Mortars consisted of 14 50 mm, 86 82 mm and 27 120 mm types. Its artillery equipment was 48 45 mm antitank guns, 12 76 mm regimental guns, 24 76 mm field guns and 12 122 mm howitzers. The division was in the Army's second echelon in its second belt of defenses and was acting as the Army's reserve on a frontage of 25 km. In order to reinforce unit boundaries it was ordered to strongly back up the 36th Guards. In late May the 43rd Guards Artillery Regiment was transferred to 36th Guards and that division's second echelon formations were moved closer to the front line, being replaced by the 44th Guards Rifle Regiment. On June 19 there was an extended discussion between Lt. Gen. M. S. Shumilov, commander of 7th Guards Army, and the chief of staff of Voronezh Front on the merits of redeploying a regiment of 213th Rifle Division to replace 44th Guards.

When the battle began on July 5 the main attacks by Army Detachment Kempf focused on the Army's right flank where it held a bridgehead over the Northern Donets near Belgorod facing the 81st Guards Rifle Division and in the center where it aimed at the junction between the 24th and 25th Guards Rifle Corps. As a result General Shumilov decided to hedge his bets and leave 15th Guards in its reserve positions in case the German force might still strike the boundary between the two Fronts after creating a diversion. Towards the end of the day the Front commander, Army Gen. N. F. Vatutin, ordered the 111th Rifle Division to come under command of 7th Guards Army and take over the positions of 15th Guards, thus freeing it and the 213th to act as Shumilov's reserve as part of an active defense. This handover was completed by 0100 hours on July 6; as part of it the division regained control of its 43rd Guards Artillery Regiment.

In the afternoon Soviet reconnaissance determined that a significant amount of the armor of 7th Panzer Division had managed to cross the Donets at Solomino and threatened the 73rd and 78th Guards Rifle Divisions of 25th Guards Rifle Corps in the main defensive belt. As insurance against any breakthrough Shumilov moved up the 15th Guards to a line along the Koren River. As part of this move the division came under the command of the same Corps. On the morning of July 7 the reconnaissance battalion of 7th Panzer reported to its headquarters that a strong defensive line along the Koren was being held by fresh troops, which forced that division to change its plans. Led by Tiger I tanks, during the day it gradually created a breach between "Batratskaia Dacha" State Farm and the village of Miasoedovo. Rather than commit 15th Guards piecemeal in response, Shumilov ordered General Vasilenko to complete a handover to the 270th Rifle Division from the rear, which was not fully accomplished until the evening of July 8.

=== Battle for the Farms ===
Despite this, during the night of July 7/8 Lt. Col. I. A. Usikov's 44th Guards Regiment was sent forward to engage the reinforced reconnaissance battalion of 7th Panzer. Confused fighting went on all night but by the end of it the 44th Guards Regiment had advanced about 1,000m and its headquarters reported knocking out or capturing two tanks, two halftracks, a 75mm gun and four machine guns as well as finding the bodies of 100 German men and officers. A truck loaded with uniforms and a motorcycle was also taken. Despite these apparent successes Usikov was later criticised for advancing hastily and without reconnaissance and adequate fire support. During July 8 he directed two further efforts to retake "Batratskaia Dacha" and the "Solovev" collective farm which failed due to dispersion of effort as well as the previous faults. At 1530 hours General Vasilenko wrote: "I decided to halt the attack by the 44th Guards Rifle Regiment until 1920 or the onset of darkness, in order to bring up fire support and prepare concentrated fire from all guns on [the two farms]." Furthermore the Voronezh Front headquarters, and through it the STAVKA, believed the two farms were back in Soviet hands. However, as an indication of the pressure on 7th Panzer to regroup and continue its advance it had committed its 58th Panzer Pioneer Battalion into the fighting at "Batratskaia Dacha" Farm; one of its men was captured and revealed under interrogation at the 15th Guards' headquarters that "[h]is company consisting of 120 men had been operating as an infantry unit. In the words of the prisoner, the company has suffered 50% losses."

As of the morning of July 9 the 25th Guards Corps had no fewer than six rifle divisions under command, although the 15th Guards and 270th Division were under operational control only and could not be used without permission from General Shumilov. By the next day Gen. W. Kempf was in a hard spot; he was being prodded by Field Marshal E. von Manstein for the slow pace of his advance and was tasked with, among many other objectives, to break through at the boundary of 15th and 94th Guards Rifle Divisions and finally reach the woods east of Miasoedovo. At this point his three panzer divisions had a combined 109 serviceable tanks and assault guns and the panzergrenadiers had also suffered heavy losses. The boundary between the two Soviet divisions was being covered by the 31st Separate Antitank Artillery Brigade, but this was now reduced to 17 45mm and 11 76mm guns.

Overnight a serious mishap occurred along this boundary due to mistakes made by a number of officers of 94th Guards. 47th Guards Regiment was to replace that Division's 286th Guards Regiment in the northern portion of the Miasoedovo woods. Not only did reconnaissance patrols of 7th Panzer discover the handover was taking place they also discovered a gap left between the two divisions due to failure to follow procedures. Taking advantage, elements of 37th Panzer Reconnaissance Battalion entered the gap and seized three hills. Upon discovering the situation Lt. Col. P. I. Gremaiko, commander of 47th Guards, ordered counterattacks which restored the situation just before noon. Only about two platoons of German infantry were involved in this but they were supported by five medium tanks and one Tiger, all of which were destroyed or knocked out by Gremaiko's forces. By the afternoon the 47th and 50th Guards Regiments had fully moved into the first echelon of 25th Guards Corps' defenses, tying into the 94th Guards Division (which was now under 35th Guards Rifle Corps of 69th Army) on the right and 73rd Guards Division on the left. At about the same time 78th Guards Division began a further effort to retake the two farms which soon ran into trouble due to heavy German fire. General Vasilenko ordered Lt. Colonel Usikov to leave one battalion of his 44th Guards Regiment on defense and attack towards the farms with the other two. Usikov now deployed his fire support effectively and the attack began well, catching units of the 7th Panzer during a redeployment.

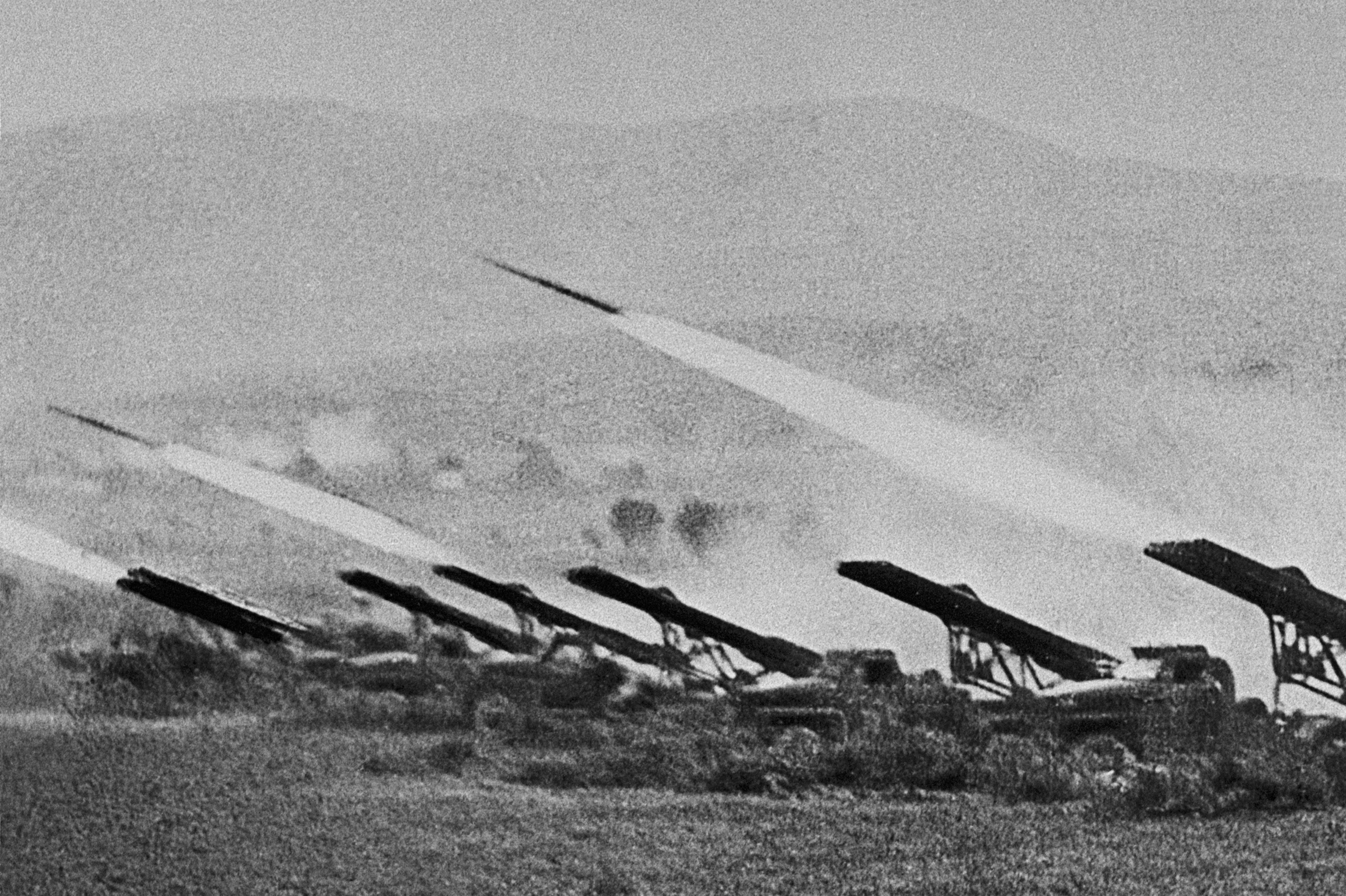
A battery of M-13 Katyusha launchers firing at enemy targets, 1943

In the course of an hour the Guardsmen pushed the German grenadiers back 300-500m into the depths of the State Farm before they began to offer strong fire resistance. To prevent the attack from bogging down it was reinforced with a regiment of 73rd Guards Division while the 25th Guards Corps commander ordered the 97th Guards Mortar Regiment to support it with rocket fire. At 1855 hours five launchers fired a salvo of 78 M-13 (4.9 kg of high explosive each) at a concentration of German infantry and armor in the area of the woods 1,000m west of "Batratskaia Dacha" Farm which "blanketed" the target. Following this Usikov's men returned to the attack. Almost immediately the left flank of his 2nd Battalion was counterattacked by a German company north of the State Farm. Usikov smoothly deployed the 8th and 9th Companies of the 3rd Battalion which overran the panzergrenadiers. Vasilenko reported: "The units with a decisive charge burst into the enemy trenches and tied the Germans up in hand-to-hand combat. The Germans, unable to withstand [this], retreated..." By day's end the 44th Guards Regiment had advanced 1.5 km and reached the western outskirts of the State Farm but was unable to take it completely. Usikov reported that in the course of the attack the regiment had lost 20 men killed and 120 wounded. Two German guns, two vehicles and four machine guns were destroyed, while two machine guns, 12 sub-machine guns, 23 rifles and 500 81mm mortar rounds were captured intact.

While this was happening, between 1820 and 2100 hours the 47th Guards Regiment repulsed three armored attacks launched by 7th Panzer but after the fourth, under pressure of superior enemy strength, the battalion commanders began to withdraw their companies to reserve positions to the east. Although Lt. Colonel Grimailo's succeeded in tying up the panzers in the woods southeast of Miasoedovo it came at a cost. By dawn on July 11 Grimailo didn't know the location of his 2nd Battalion, which had taken 7th Panzer's main attack. Vasilenko was forced to move up reserve, the divisional training battalion, to the regiment's right flank. By 0700 communications to the battalion were restored and its commander reported a serious situation: the whereabouts of more than half the personnel was still unknown; panzers had crushed four 45mm antitank guns; and almost all the machine guns had been knocked out. During the previous day the 47th Guards Regiment had suffered about 400 casualties. Its limited retreat gave 7th Panzer just enough space to manoeuvre for a further advance against the left flank of 94th Guards Division.

With the training battalion and what remained of 31st Antitank Brigade forming the boundary with 94th Guards Division it was clear that reinforcements were required, so General Shumilov ordered six KV tanks of the 262nd Heavy Tank Regiment to move up for this purpose. Further tank support in the form of T-34s also arrived in the early afternoon, four of which would substantially strengthen the depleted 47th Guards. However it was the 29 gun crews of 31st Antitank that mainly attracted the attention of 7th Panzer. They were not adequately covered by the infantry of 94th Guards and near noon came under attack by 16 German tanks, most of which were Tigers, and by 1430 hours had been crushed, at the cost of between 20-34 armored vehicles. Once this was accomplished the German division moved a company of tanks to its right flank to contain the 15th Guards while its main forces launched an attack against the left-flank regiment of 94th Guards. The objective of Kempf's III Panzer Corps now was to get into the rear of 69th Army and link up with 4th Panzer Army at Prokhorovka.

During July 12 General Shumilov sought to distract Kempf's forces from their mission by launching counterattacks towards his forward supply base at Krutoi Log. At this time the 15th Guards was still in good shape with a total of 8,440 men as of the previous morning, but most of the counterattack force was much weaker. According to the plan the division was to launch secondary attacks with 44th and 47th Rifle Regiments and the training battalion against the left flank of the 198th Infantry Division. However, mostly due to a lack of supporting artillery the attack was halted in its tracks within a few hundred metres. By noon the 44th Guards managed to renew its assault and took the "Solovev" collective farm by 1235 hours; this was especially noted at the headquarters of Army Detachment Kempf where von Manstein was located. At this point the attack stalled again and the regiment continued to engage in heavy fighting there until late in the evening. During the day the division lost 146 men killed and 881 wounded according to 7th Guards Army records. The same evening Hitler announced his decision to end the offensive.

== Into Ukraine ==
By the beginning of August the 15th Guards had moved to Steppe Front with 7th Guards Army, but was now part of 49th Rifle Corps with 111th Rifle Division. Later that month both divisions were awarded one of the first honorifics granted by the STAVKA:

KHARKOV... 15th Guards Rifle Division (Major General Vasilenko, Emelyan Ivanovich)... The troops who participated in the liberation of Kharkov, by the order of the Supreme High Command of 23 August 1943, and a commendation in Moscow, are given a salute of 20 artillery salvoes from 224 guns.

In October Steppe Front became the 2nd Ukrainian Front and the division was reassigned to the 68th Rifle Corps of 37th Army, before being moved to the 57th Rifle Corps of the same Army a month later. In January, 37th Army was shifted to 3rd Ukrainian Front and the 15th Guards joined the 82nd Rifle Corps. On January 26, 1944 General Vasilenko was wounded and hospitalized; he was replaced in command by Col. Pyotr Mikhailovich Chirkov. This officer would be promoted to the rank of major general on March 19 and held this position for the duration of the war. During the Nikopol-Krivoi Rog Offensive the division was recognized for its role in the liberation of the latter city with the award of the Order of Suvorov, 2nd degree, on February 26.

At the beginning of April as the 37th Army was approaching the Dniestr River and the Romanian border the 15th Guards was the Army's reserve formation. Overnight on April 18/19 the Army was to make a second effort to cross the river and seize German positions near Bender that included the division committed from reserve. In the event the offensive was postponed until April 20 and in heavy fighting over the next five days the Army made no progress whatsoever. Despite this failure one soldier of the 44th Guards Regiment managed to burnish his reputation. Sergeant Mikhail Stepanovich Sokhin had begun the sniping "movement" in his regiment the previous year and had trained many other personnel in sniping tactics. During this battle he had led a party of four across the river without being observed, set up a good position near the front line, and personally accounted for two German officers and three machine gun crewmen, supporting the crossing of the rest of the regiment. By May his score stood at 202 enemy officers and men and on September 13 Sokhin, now a sergeant-major, was made a Hero of the Soviet Union. His final official total was 261 killed, making him the 53rd-highest-scoring Soviet sniper of the war. He survived the fighting and lived until September 17, 1987.

In June the 15th Guards was removed to the Reserve of the Supreme High Command where it joined the 34th Guards Rifle Corps of 5th Guards Army. The division would remain under these commands for the duration of the war. In July the Army was assigned to 1st Ukrainian Front, where it would also remain for the duration.

== Into Poland and Germany ==
Under 1st Ukrainian Front the division took part in the Lvov–Sandomierz Offensive. In early August the 5th Guards Army entered the bridgehead over the Vistula that had been created by the 6th Guards Tank Corps near Baranów Sandomierski. About the beginning of November the personnel of the division were noted as being 90 percent Ukrainian, but by the new year there had been an influx of replacements, changing the mix to about 66 percent Russian and 33 percent Ukrainian.

1st Ukrainian Front launched its part of the Vistula-Oder Offensive on January 12, 1945. Following a two-hour artillery preparation, the 15th Guards broke through the entire depth of the German defenses west of Sandomierz, overrunning the German artillery positions as well as the fortifications along the Nitsa River. Over the following days it would also force crossings of the Pilica and the Warta. For their roles in the victories around Sandomierz all three rifle regiments of the division as well as the 11th Guards Sapper Battalion would later be awarded the Order of the Red Banner, while the 43rd Guards Artillery Regiment received the Order of Suvorov, 3rd Degree. During the advance the 50th Guards Rifle Regiment was also awarded an honorific:

"CHESTOCHOWA"... 50th Guards Rifle Regiment (Colonel Birin, Boris Ivanovich)... The troops who participated in the liberation of Chestochowa and several other towns, by the order of the Supreme High Command of 17 January 1945, and a commendation in Moscow, are given a salute of 20 artillery salvoes from 224 guns.

The 44th Guards Rifle Regiment would later receive the battle honor "Silesia" while the 43rd Guards Artillery was awarded "Oder".

On January 23 units of the division reached that river in the area from Frauendorf to Zagred about 6 km north of Oppeln. Maj. Mikhail Efimovich Kolosov, commander of the 1st Battalion of the 50th Guards Regiment, ordered an assault team to cross the frozen river which it did almost without a fight, afterwards digging in at a dam. This group was hit by several German counterattacks but threw them back with little difficulty. Meanwhile, Kolosov took advantage of this distraction to get the rest of his battalion over the river. By the dawn of January 24 he had linked up with elements of 47th Guards Regiment to the south, helping to create a bridgehead 5 km wide and 3 km deep which was successfully held for the next two days. In recognition of his accomplishment Major Kolosov was made a Hero of the Soviet Union on June 27, along with two of his subordinates: Sr. Sgt. P. F. Torgunakov and Sr. Sgt. V. N. Plesinov. On February 19 the division would be awarded the Order of Kutuzov, 2nd Degree, as a reward for its successes in the fighting for Oppeln, Ravich and Trachenberg. On the same date the 47th Guards Regiment received the Order of Bogdan Khmelnitsky, 2nd Degree, for its operations in Silesia.

=== Lower Silesian Offensive ===
On the night of January 30/31 the 55th Rifle Corps of 21st Army relieved 34th Guards Corps in its bridgehead between Oppeln and Brieg. Beginning on February 8 the 5th Guards Army took part in the Front's Lower Silesian Offensive with its main objective of encircling the German garrison of Breslau. On its sector the offensive was based on the bridgehead seized by 14th Guards Rifle Division in January. The German defense was based on the 269th Infantry Division with several battlegroups, independent battalions, two panzer battalions and an NCO school. The Army's attack was led by 32nd Guards Rifle Corps and developed slowly over the first three days. On February 11 the Front commander, Marshal I. S. Konev, shifted the 31st Tank Corps from 21st Army and committed it on the sector of 33rd Guards Rifle Corps the next day with the immediate objective of capturing the Bogenau area. Over the next two days the 34th Guards Corps was committed from second echelon and advanced steadily.

On February 13 German resistance did not abate and if anything increased as further forces entered the Breslau area but despite this the 4th Guards and 31st Tank Corps linked up with the 7th Guards Mechanized Corps of 6th Army to complete the encirclement. Konev chose to leave 6th Army and 34th Guards Corps to maintain the siege while the 32nd and 33rd Guards Corps of 5th Guards Army were ordered to make a decisive attack from the Magnitz area toward Koberwitz and then to the southwest. By the end of February 15 the cordon between the encircled forces and the main German forces had been widened to up to 13 km. By February 25 the 34th Guards Corps was taken out of the line in the Breslau area.

=== Upper Silesian Offensive ===
For this offensive the Corps was used to reinforce the 21st Army while remaining under 5th Guards Army command. The Corps would attack with 4th Guards Tank Corps in the direction of Priborn with the task of reaching a line from Strelen to Munsterberg by the end of the second day. The Corps was reinforced with the 116th Heavy Howitzer and 1st Howitzer Brigades, the 7th Mortar Brigade and the 1073rd Antitank Artillery Regiment. The 15th and 58th Guards Rifle Divisions were in first echelon with the 112th Rifle Division in second. The 15th and 58th each formed a forward detachment consisting of a reinforced rifle battalion. In addition the Corps detached a forward battalion, which went into the attack at 0600 hours on March 15.

The preliminary attack began after a 10-minute artillery preparation and the infantry assault took the defenders off guard by following very close behind the artillery. The forward battalion, attacking on the left flank, captured the grove 1,000m north of Voigtsdorf. The main Corps attack began at 1120 hours following an additional 80 minutes of artillery fire. 4th Guards Tank was committed to the attack at the same time from the western outskirts of Grottkau. The assault broke through along a 3 km front and by the end of the day had widened the gap to 5 km and captured the German second line of defenses along the left flank. The advance continued overnight and into the next day, gaining just 3 km but also providing flank cover for the mobile forces of 21st and 4th Tank Army which were attacking in the direction of the Neisse River. Beginning from the latter half of March 20 the 34th Guards Rifle and 4th Guards Tank Corps continued to attack to the west, beating off numerous counterattacks and eventually reaching the east bank of the Krin River. The offensive officially ended on March 22, but from the 24th to the 27th the two Corps, joined by 32nd Guards Corps, engaged in a battle for the town of Strelen which was only partially successful before being halted on March 28.

=== Berlin Operation ===
Prior to the start of the Berlin offensive the 112th Division was replaced by the 14th Guards Division in 34th Guards Corps. 5th Guards Army was deployed along the eastern bank of the Neisse on a 13 km front and planned to launch its main attack with its right wing on the 8 km sector from Gross Saerchen to Muskau. While the Corps had its divisions in a single echelon 15th and 58th Guards were in the attack sector while 14th Guards was holding along the river, which was about 50m wide and 2-3m deep at this point.

When the offensive began on April 16 the 15th Guards was to break through the German defense on a sector from Kobeln to the farm, help to eliminate a German bridgehead on the eastern bank in the Muskau area, then cross the Neisse under the cover of massed artillery fire and capture the northern part of Berg before advancing into the German rear. For this mission the 50th Guards Regiment was supported with a company of tanks, a platoon of self-propelled guns, a sapper company and two batteries from a separate antitank battalion. The 47th Guards Regiment had the same supporting forces less one antitank battery while the 44th Guards Regiment was in the second echelon with orders to assault across the Neisse behind either the 50th Regiment or in the sector of the 58th Guards Division, depending on circumstances. For the crossing the division had gathered 33 boats, two 16-tonne ferries and two 3.5-tonne captured pontoons. In addition each first echelon battalion had one storming bridge and a large number of improvised crossing means had been prepared.

The attack was covered by a powerful artillery preparation under which the Muskau bridgehead was overrun and eliminated. The 50th Guards Regiment reached the river by 0800 hours and completed its crossing to the west bank two hours later. The right flank of the 47th Guards Regiment also reached the river by 0930 while its left flank was still fighting along the northern outskirts of Muskau; despite this at 1100 the Regiment began forcing the river in the area of the farm but was met with heavy German fire and failed to cross. General Chirkov addressed this situation by committing the 44th Guards Regiment into the battle, using the crossings of the 50th Guards Regiment and one crossing of the 58th Guards Division. This Regiment crossed successfully and attacked to the southwest, carrying out the assignment of the 47th Guards Regiment and by noon had begun clearing the north of Berg in conjunction with the 50th Guards Regiment. The 47th Guards Regiment meanwhile detached a company to mop up the Muskau bridgehead while moving into the division's second echelon. During the rest of the day the 15th and 58th Guards Divisions advanced as much as 6 km into the German defenses on the west bank and continued to advance through the night, reaching the Wossinka area by 0100 hours on April 17. Later that morning the division crossed over its artillery and helped clear the passage of the 14th Guards by advancing into the rear of the German forces it was facing.

By April 22 the 5th Guards Army was pursuing defeated German forces to the west, destroying rearguards and advancing 30 km during the day. 14th Guards was left behind to help guard the south flank of the advance while the 15th and 58th Guards continued attacking towards the Elbe River. On April 25 the 58th Guards Division joined hands with the U.S. 69th Infantry Division at Torgau.

== Postwar ==
From May 6–11 the 15th Guards took part, with the rest of 1st Ukrainian Front, in the final offensive on Prague, in recognition of which it received its second honorific:

PRAGUE... 15th Guards Rifle Division (Major General Chirkov, Pyotr Mikhailovich)... The troops who participated in the liberation of Prague, by the order of the Supreme High Command of 9 May 1945, and a commendation in Moscow, are given a salute of 24 artillery salvoes from 324 guns.

On May 28 the division was further distinguished with the award of its second Order of the Red Banner for its part in the capture of Cottbus and several nearby towns in Germany. Immediately after the war the division did garrison duty in Austria, followed by a move to the northwest Ukrainian cities of Volodymyr-Volynskyi and Liuboml. In late 1947 was moved to Crimea and the Kuban, being redesignated as the 15th Guards Motor Rifle Division in 1957. It September 1965 it was renumbered as the "51st" and became the 2nd formation of the 51st Guards Motor Rifle Division.
