= 78th Guards Rifle Division =

- Active: 1943–1946
- Country: Soviet Union
- Branch: Red Army
- Type: Division
- Role: Infantry
- Engagements: Battle of Kursk; Belgorod-Kharkov Offensive; Poltava-Kremenchug Offensive; Battle of the Dniepr; Korsun–Cherkassy Pocket; Uman–Botoșani Offensive; First Jassy–Kishinev Offensive; Lvov-Sandomierz Offensive; Vistula-Oder Offensive; Lower Silesian Offensive; Battle of Berlin; Battle of the Oder–Neisse; Spremberg–Torgau Offensive Operation; Battle of Bautzen (1945); Prague Offensive
- Decorations: Order of Suvorov
- Battle honours: Vistula

Commanders
- Notable commanders: Maj. Gen. Aleksandr Vasilevich Skvortsov; Maj. Gen. Aleksandr Grigorevich Motov; Maj. Gen. Zakhar Trofimovich Trofimov

The 78th Guards Rifle Division was reformed as an elite infantry division of the Red Army in March 1943, based on the 1st formation of the 204th Rifle Division, and served in that role until after the end of the Great Patriotic War.

As the 204th it had fought in the Battle of Stalingrad and distinguished itself during Operation Ring in the 64th Army. It remained assigned to that Army when it was redesignated as the 7th Guards Army. It moved north to the Kursk area joining Voronezh Front and played an important role in the defense of the Northern Donets River south of the salient as part of the 25th Guards Rifle Corps during Operation Zitadelle. Following this victory it fought in the Belgorod-Kharkov Offensive in August and continued advancing toward the Dniepr River into the early autumn. During the crossing operations over the Dniepr a large number of the division's personnel distinguished themselves, becoming Heroes of the Soviet Union, including the divisional commander, or receiving other awards. During January and February 1944 the 78th Guards was involved in the fighting around Korsun-Shevchenkovski and went through several reassignments before ending up in the 33rd Guards Rifle Corps of 5th Guards Army where it remained for the duration of the war. As part of 1st Ukrainian Front it made a successful advance into southeastern Poland during the Lvov-Sandomierz Offensive and was awarded a divisional honorific for its assault crossing of the Vistula River. In January 1945 the division attacked through southern Poland and into Silesia, taking part in the battles around Breslau and later in the offensive against Berlin in April before ending the war near Prague. Following the German surrender the division was decorated with the Order of Suvorov for its part in the capture of Dresden. Despite a laudable combat record the 78th Guards was disbanded in July, 1946.

== Formation ==
The 204th was redesignated as the 78th Guards on March 1, a month after the German surrender at Stalingrad, and officially received its Guards banner on April 20. Once the division completed its reorganization its order of battle was as follows:

- 223rd Guards Rifle Regiment (from 700th Rifle Regiment)
- 225th Guards Rifle Regiment (from 706th Rifle Regiment)
- 228th Guards Rifle Regiment (from 730th Rifle Regiment)
- 158th Guards Artillery Regiment (from 657th Artillery Regiment)
- 81st Guards Antitank Battalion
- 75th Guards Reconnaissance Company
- 89th Guards Sapper Battalion
- 107th Guards Signal Battalion
- 85th Guards Medical/Sanitation Battalion
- 82nd Guards Chemical Defense (Anti-gas) Company
- 83rd Guards Motor Transport Company
- 77th Guards Field Bakery
- 79th Guards Divisional Veterinary Hospital
- 1487th Field Postal Station
- 921st Field Office of the State Bank

Maj. Gen. Aleksandr Vasilevich Skvortsov, who had commanded the 204th since July 10, 1942, remained in command. As 64th Army moved north towards Kursk the German counteroffensive at Kharkov was unfolding. As elements of the SS Panzer Corps entered Belgorod on March 18 forces of the Soviet 69th Army were taking up a defense along the east bank of the Northern Donets. The next day the 73rd Guards Rifle Division, leading 64th Army, began to assemble in the Shebekino - Miasoedovo area and on March 24 the Army took over the 69th's defense sector. On April 17 the 64th officially became the 7th Guards Army, and the 78th Guards was subordinated to the new 25th Guards Rifle Corps, which included the 73rd and 81st Guards Rifle Divisions, all under command of Maj. Gen. G. B. Safiulin. In May it was noted that the division's personnel were 80 percent of several Asian nationalities and 20 percent Russian.

== Battle of Kursk ==
As of July 1 the 25th Guards Corps was deployed with the 78th and 81st Guards in its first echelon, with 73rd Guards in second echelon as Corps reserve. The 78th Guards stood on the east bank of the Donets from an unnamed correction labor camp to Dorogobuzheno to Nizhnii Olshanets to Krutoi Log and Generalovka, a frontage of 10 km. On its left it tied in with the 72nd Guards Rifle Division of 24th Guards Rifle Corps. When the German offensive began on July 5 its combat strength was as follows: 8,346 personnel, 824 horses and 103 motor vehicles, equipped with 4,766 rifles, 2,287 sub-machine guns, 387 light and 137 heavy machine guns, 199 antitank rifles, 54 light, 81 medium and 18 heavy mortars, 43 antitank guns, 12 76mm regimental guns, 19 76mm cannons and 11 122mm howitzers.

German plan of attack at Kursk. Note location of the 7th Guards Army east and southeast of Belgorod.

By a narrow margin this made the 78th Guards the smallest division in 7th Guards Army. It deployed nine guns (45 mm – 152 mm calibre) per kilometre of its front. General Skvortsov reported on the difficulties he faced due to the terrain in creating a strong defense:

The steep slopes on the western bank of the Northern Donets River and the system of ridges, covered by woods to a depth of 2-3 kilometres from the forward edge, as well as the villages that run along the western bank, gave the advantage to the enemy to position his troops in concealment... The ground on the eastern bank was low, gradually rising to the east and deprived of natural cover. The open terrain was exposed to enemy surveillance to the entire depth of the defense and made it difficult to camouflage our positions or maneuver with reserves... The absence of commanding heights made it difficult to set up observation posts... The lack of paved and improved roads in the division's sector and the distant location of the supply base in Volokonovka, 100 kilometres away, didn't allow the timely and complete supply of the troops with materiel for conducting battle.

As with the rest of the Army the division's defense was constructed with a main position of three trench lines and a reserve position of two lines; the latter ran along the Belgorod - Titovka railroad bed. The regiments were arranged in two echelons, with Maj. I. A. Khitsov's 228th Guards Regiment and Maj. D. S. Khorolenko's 225th Guards Regiment forward and Maj. S. A. Arshinov's 223rd Guards Regiment in reserve. The 228th on the right was reinforced with two antitank rifle companies and eight 45 mm antitank guns and covered a sector about 5 km wide. The 225th on the left had one extra antitank rifle company and held a 7 km sector, backed by the 1st and 3rd Battalions of the 158th Guards Artillery in the antitank strongpoint at Krutoi Log. The 158th's 2nd Battalion was posted at Razumnoye behind the boundary of the rifle regiments. Two battalions of the 223rd Regiment defended the Generalovka - Krutoi Log - Hill 164.7 sector with its third battalion in divisional reserve. All three of these regimental commanders had recently replaced more experienced officers who had been promoted or sent for further military studies.

One aspect of the Soviet planning for the German offensive was a counter-artillery preparation once the time of the initial attack was ascertained. For this purpose the 158th Guards Artillery Regiment had the 3rd Battalion of the 213th Rifle Division's 671st Artillery Regiment attached; this division was deployed in the Army's second echelon. In response to heavy German activity on the afternoon of July 4 the commander of Voronezh Front, Army Gen. N. F. Vatutin, ordered the first phase of the bombardment to begin at 2230 hours. A second phase in the sector of 7th Guards Army began at 0330 hours on July 5, concentrated opposite the defenses of the 81st, 78th and 72nd Guards where the largest concentrations of Army Detachment Kempf had been revealed. This barrage was more successful than those of the other Soviet armies, in large part because Kempf's lead units had started to force a crossing of the Donets about 30 minutes before and were particularly vulnerable. The German bridgehead at Mikhailovka opposite the 81st Guards was especially hard-hit which led the III Panzer Corps to divert its 6th Panzer Division to make a crossing opposite the 78th Guards. However the 106th Infantry Division of Kempf's Corps "Raus" nearly opposite the 78th was also surprised and bloodied by the shellfire. General Skvortsov directed most of his division's guns on the village of Solomino and in ten minutes fired 1,700 76 mm and 122 mm shells at this target which was also being worked over by part of the 25th Guards Corps' artillery.

At the outset of the offensive the 78th Guards directly faced the 7th Panzer and part of the 19th Panzer Divisions plus about one-third of the 168th Infantry Division. The attack was led by a battlegroup of the 168th ahead of the 19th Panzer, which had the objective of striking the boundary of the 78th and 81st Guards. This division had the support of a company of Tiger tanks of the 503rd Heavy Panzer Battalion, but it would require the construction of a 60-tonne bridge to get these across the Donets.

Despite heavy blocking artillery fire the 19th Panzer's 73rd Panzergrenadier Regiment managed to get across the river north of Dalnie Peski, penetrated the forward edge of the 1st Battalion of the 228th Guards Regiment and took the village in about 90 minutes. This crossing was essential for bridging purposes. By 0500 hours the Guards battalion was falling back under cover of machine gun fire from the 3rd Battalion. At noon the 19th Panzer's commander reported that his 73rd Regiment had run into bitter resistance when attacking the woods south of the correction labor camp and was locked in heavy fighting, while also expressing surprise at the extent and strength of the Red Army fortifications. Also at 0500 the 228th Guards Regiment faced a deteriorating situation on its left flank south of Dorogobuzheno. The adjacent 225th Guards Regiment had thrown back a first crossing attempt by a battlegroup of 7th Panzer at 0425, but this was followed by the laying of a smokescreen and a renewed effort which broke through to the first trench line held by the regiment's 2nd Battalion in the vicinity of Solomino. German engineers immediately began constructing a bridge built on piles which allowed medium tanks to begin crossing by 0725 hours. Most of these formed up to break through across the Solomino - Razumnoye road while a small group supported the infantry attempting to roll up the defense of the 2nd Battalion of the 225th Guards from south to north and emerge on the flank of the 3rd Battalion of the 228th Guards.

While 7th Panzer had scored some early successes the resistance of the defenders began to increase. At this point the efforts of the 106th Infantry Division began to affect the battle; it had crossed two battalions in the Karnaukhovka area by 0530 hours and these struck the left flank of the 78th Guards while trying to break through to Nizhnii Olshanets. This put Cpt. I. A. Matsokin's 2nd Battalion/225th Guards in danger of encirclement by a pincer move by the 106th and the 7th Panzer, which began at 0830 hours. After holding out for a bit more than an hour Matsokin was forced to order a retreat to the Dorogobuzheno - Belgorod road. Around 0930 soldiers of the 106th Infantry began to infiltrate into Nizhnii Olshanets. The antitank strongpoint in this village was held by the 1st Battalion/225th Guards commanded by Cpt. A. Ya. Belovitsky and due to Matsokin's retreat the battalion's right flank was exposed. Fierce street fighting broke out in the southern portion of the village. After receiving a report on the situation, Skvortsov ordered Major Arshinov to prepare his 1st Battalion/223rd Guards for an immediate counterattack. At the same time he received a report of German tanks assembling on the road leading from Hill 108.9 to the Razumnoye railyard.

Although there are conflicting accounts of the number of German tanks and assault guns actually across the river at this time (25th Guards Corps headquarters claimed as many as 90) up until 1000 hours the 78th Guards continued to contain the simultaneous attack of three German divisions, but with increasing difficulty, and its strength was melting away. Its first trench line had fallen on four sectors and in some places the forward battalions had been forced to retreat to reserve positions. Over the next hour the 7th Panzer launched an attack toward the Razumnoye railyard with 20-25 panzers and at least two battalions of infantry. The railyard was held by one company of 3rd Battalion/225th Guards and those elements of 2nd Battalion that had fallen back. Skvortsov was ordered to move the 3rd Battalion/223rd Guards to reinforce the position and to set up all guns for direct fire. The first German attack was thrown back with difficulty and 17 armored vehicles were knocked out.

At the same time the 6th and 19th Panzers were increasing the pressure on the flanks of the 228th Guards Regiment and its 9th Company was locked in heavy fighting in Dorogobuzheno with infantry and tanks of 7th Panzer. Major Khitsov ordered his 3rd Battalion to withdraw to reserve positions on the southwest outskirts of Razumnoye which it reached at about 1330 hours and took up a defense. It was followed by up to a battalion of panzergrenadiers and 16 tanks attempting to break through to the village but held its ground while the five leading panzers were knocked out by antitank guns under command of Sen. Lt. D. O. Grishin. However a counterattack in cooperation with 2nd Battalion/225th Guards failed to regain that Regiment's initial position. Another company of tanks with mounted infantry reached the orchard 1000 m east of Nizhnii Olshanets, threatening to take not only that village but also to break through to Krutoi Log. Around 1400 hours, under the increasing pressure of superior forces, Skvortsov ordered his division to go over to a mobile defense.

=== Battle for Krutoi Log ===
At 1420 hours 38 tanks and up to a company of German infantry neared the outskirts of Krutoi Log. In the course of an hour-long combat the 25th Panzer Regiment, having lost several vehicles, bypassed the position of the 7th Company of the 225th Guards and the 2nd Battalion of the same Regiment at the Razumnoye railyard and slowly moved on toward Hill 160.8, leaving the railyard garrison encircled. This garrison soon began evacuating to reserve positions while 30 panzers and a company of motorcyclists, after crossing the Krutoi Log - Razumnoye road, came under intense fire from the 158th Guards Artillery, bringing the advance to a halt. By this time the 225th Guards Regiment was largely defending on a line from Hill 160.8 to the northwestern outskirts of Krutoi Log. As this situation was developing the Corps commander, General Safiulin had sent out orders to his reserves:

The 73rd Guards Rifle Division with the 167th Separate Tank Regiment, the 1438th Self-propelled Artillery Regiment (SU-122s) and the 30th Separate Destroyer Anti-tank Artillery Brigade are to assemble... in readiness to launch a counterattack in the direction of Krutoi Log and the Razumnoye railyard, further according to the situation, in order to restore the positions of the 78th Guards Rifle Division.

However the assembly of this group of forces went slowly, including the mobile units. At 1500 hours the columns of the 73rd Guards were only nearing the "Batratskaya Dacha" State Farm and still had more than 5 km to cover on foot. Even as these were moving up the 7th Panzer Division kept advancing and after 1500 combat was already going on in the depth of the 78th Guards' defenses. By 1700 Nizhnii Olshanets was completely isolated and the lead panzers were closing on Krutoi Log. However, heavy artillery fire was slowing their progress.

On the right flank of the 78th Guards its 228th Regiment had been facing attacks by the 19th Panzer Division. It put up a determined defense, aided by artillery that had been assigned to support the 81st Guards on its right; staff officers of the panzer division stated: "It might be hardest of all to picture the stubbornness of the Russians, with which they defended each foxhole and trench. An enemy group in strength of up to one regiment, reinforced by a mortar battalion, in elaborately fortified woods, offered the fiercest resistance." However, by now its 1st Battalion had been driven from Hill 126.3 which led to the collapse of the defense on this flank. By 1400 hours the 19th and 7th Panzers joined forces and were breaking into Razumnoye, which was held by the 228th's 2nd and 3rd Battalions. After street fighting began the regiment's command and control was disrupted when a group of German halftracks reached its command post. The regiment's chief of staff, Maj. V. S. Solianko, directed the all-round defense of the headquarters guard, armed largely with grenades and antitank rifles. After this officer was severely wounded by a shell explosion Sgt. I. P. Savchenko took over as leader and destroyed a halftrack with grenades before being killed by machine gun fire. Overall, despite 7th Panzer having driven a corridor about 4 km deep by 1600 hours, the defenses of the 78th and 81st Guards had completely disrupted the plans of the III Panzer Corps.

By 1800 hours the situation on the division's extreme right flank had substantially deteriorated. The 7th and 19th Panzers had penetrated much of the 228th Guards positions and were now striking the flank of the 223rd Guards. An Abwehr commando group attempted to infiltrate and overrun the headquarters of the 1st Battalion/228th Regiment but was discovered and fought off; Guardsman N. K. Rybalkin accounted for about a dozen of the attackers with his sub-machine gun then killed another four using his puukko in hand-to-hand combat before himself being killed. He was recognized posthumously with the award of the Order of the Red Banner. By 1900 the 19th Panzer had been stopped by tank and antitank fire from the "Day of Harvest" collective farm and Generalovka and had lost 32 tanks destroyed or disabled, including nearly all the Tigers of its attached company.

The 167th Tank Regiment was under the operational control of the commander of the 73rd Guards, Col. S. A. Kozak. As his division came up Kozak moved to Skvortsov's forward observation post on Hill 209.6 from where he gained an impression that the position of the 78th Guards was more desperate than it actually was. At about 1630 hours he ordered the tank regiment into an unsupported attack to restore the situation; in the course of two-and-a-half hours of combat the 167th lost 75 percent of its 27 T-34s and five T-70s, although this sacrifice provided cover for the retreating elements of the division, primarily the 225th Regiment, to rally and organize a mobile defense. Active combat operations mostly ended by about 2300 hours on this sector although fighting continued almost all night in Razumnoye and at Krutoi Log. The situation on the division's front was prompting the greatest concern within the 7th Guards Army command. The attackers now had two strong panzer groups across the Donets and had split the 78th Guards' defense almost to its entire depth, threatening the left flank and rear of the 81st Guards, which was still holding its initial positions. The division reported 383 killed and 53 missing-in-action during the day; the 225th Regiment alone counted 271 dead and 1,006 wounded.

In the German planning for July 6 the 6th and 19th Panzers would attack side by side along the Razumnaia River and smash through the boundary of the 81st Guards and the 78th and 73rd Guards up to the 7th Guards Army's second belt of defenses while also taking Razumnoye. At dawn a reconnaissance-in-force was launched in the direction of the "New World" collective farm in the valley of the Razumnaia which was defended by elements of the 2nd Battalion/228th Guards. Among the most important objectives for Army Detachment Kempf at this point were Razumnoye and Krutoi Log which were splitting its advancing corps and hampering the advance of the 7th and 19th Panzers with flanking fire. The latter village was in the sector of the 106th Infantry. That division's Infantry Regiment 240 was ordered to take it from units of the 78th Guards that had fallen back to it the previous day while a detachment of 7th Panzer's Panzer Regiment 25 was to attack positions of the 73rd Guards in the direction of Hill 191.2.

A critical situation soon took shape in the area of Hill 187.4 as 28 German armored vehicles broke through to its foot. The commander of the 73rd Guards' 214th Guards Regiment ordered up the 1438th SU Regiment which went into action at 1000 hours, trading losses with the German grouping until it fell back. Meanwhile, elements of Infantry Regiment 240 broke into Krutoi Log from several directions. The defending 225th Regiment reported that the German infantry were "totally numb to everything and were advancing literally head-on with no regard for losses." Prisoners were taken following hand-to-hand combat on some sectors, many of whom proved to be drunk on alcohol. Although accounts differ, it appears that the regiment had been encircled by 1100 hours and soon received contradictory orders. According to the division's chief political officer, Col. B. I. Mutovin:

I was at the division headquarters when... Khorolenko reported to General Skvortsov that the fascist tanks had been stopped by the fire of the 158th Artillery Regiment and the corps and army anti-tank forces, and the infantry had been separated from the tanks. The Major requested aid in throwing back the enemy, in order to come out of the encirclement. A. V. Skvortsov was plainly upset. "Of course things are hard for Khorolenko, and he needs help, but how? All of the regiments are tied up in fighting in their own sectors of defense," he said, addressing me. "He must hold out. The village of Krutoi Log must be held whatever happens." ... I offered a suggestion: "Perhaps it is possible to support the regiment with the fire from the division's artillery group and the corps' anti-tank guns?" Skvortsov thought for a moment. "I think that's what we'll do," he agreed. "Pass this along to the corps commander." General Safiulin, having heard my report, kept silent for a long time, before ordering: "Tell Khorolenko that he should abandon Krutoi Log under the supporting artillery fire and come out of the pocket. Otherwise, the entire regiment will perish..."

The 225th Guards began to break out around noon although due to disrupted communications not all companies received the orders. These difficulties were made worse by attacks from Il-2 aircraft ordered by Colonel Kozak, who was unaware of the true situation in the village. Some remnants managed to fight their way out to friendly lines by 1500; the 2nd Battalion, which provided the covering force, was hit particularly hard and lost its commander, Cpt. I. A. Matsokin, among those killed.

Meanwhile, along the Razumnaia the rest of the 78th Guards was under attack from the 19th Panzers. The 1st and 2nd Battalions/223rd Regiment were in first echelon along a line from 1,000 m south of Generalovka to Hill 164.7 to the northeast outskirts of Krutoi Log and were backed by a battalion of the 73rd Guards' 209th Regiment. By noon the entire 228th Guards Regiment had been forced to fall back to the right bank of the river from Razumnoye to Generalovka, leaving behind rearguards and scattered mines. This redeployment prevented the 6th and 19th Panzers from linking their adjacent flanks, even after seizing Razumnoye. By mid-afternoon the 2nd Battalion/223rd Guards in Generalovka, supported by the remnants of the 167th Tanks, came under heavy artillery and tank fire and after losing more than half of its men began to retreat toward the "Day of Harvest" collective farm in disorganized groups leaving its own artillery without cover. 19th Panzer reached to within 600 m of this farm at 1530 hours but there encountered deep minefields through which a narrow passage was cleared only by 1910. It was clear to General Shumilov that the 223rd and 209th Regiments were no longer combat effective and he requested assistance by reserves from Voronezh Front.

=== Fighting near "Batratskaia Dacha" ===
Overnight on July 6/7 Army Detachment Kempf prepared to finally break through the second line of defense of 7th Guards Army and reach the right flank of 4th Panzer Army. This would involve driving the 73rd Guards and elements of the 78th and 72nd Guards and the 213th Rifle Divisions across the Koren River to secure the right flank of III Panzer Corps. At the same time the left-flank regiment of the 94th Guards Rifle Division was moved into the second echelon behind the positions of the 73rd Guards. Safiulin's orders from General Vatutin for July 7 were to hold his Corps' line. Before dawn the 106th Infantry went on the attack with up to a regiment, supported by 13 tanks towards the Koren in the sector held by the 73rd Guards' 211th Regiment, backed by the 223rd and 225th Guards Regiments from south of the "Batratskaia Dacha" State Farm and the "Poliana" State Farm, reinforced by the 201st Separate Tank Brigade (British Matilda and Valentine tanks). By 0500 hours this attack had been driven back with the loss of four German tanks knocked out. A further attack began at 0700 by was focused on the 78th Guards and captured the "Poliana" State Farm at the boundary of the 24th and 25th Guards Corps. The decimated rifle companies of the 223rd and 225th were becoming unable to withstand the attacks of German tanks and there were also signs of panic on certain sectors. At one critical moment General Skvortsov didn't trust a report from Major Arshinov that his 223rd Regiment was holding Gremiachii and demanded written proof from his neighboring units. In fact the 223rd continued to hold until dark. Major Khorolenko twice personally led his men in counterattacks toward the village during the day's fighting.

At 1300 hours a further strong attack by the 106th Infantry toward the "Poliana" State Farm began, involving up to a regiment of infantry and 17 tanks. One battalion of the 73rd Guards' 211th Guards Regiment, suffering significant losses and unable to withstand the attack of superior forces, began retreating in the direction of Churayevo, 4 km to the southeast and exposing the flank of the 225th Regiment. In order to restore the position General Safiulin personally assembled the other two battalions of the 211th Guards, the 225th Guards Regiment and 1st Battalion/793rd Rifle Regiment of the 213th Rifle Division (which was made operationally subordinate to Major Khorolenko) and launched a counterattack at about 1600 hours toward Gremiachii and the Machine Tractor Station, with fire support from the 201st Tanks and the 1529th Heavy Self-propelled Artillery Regiment (SU-152s). After a 10-minute artillery preparation and an hour of close-in combat this grouping retook what remained of the hamlet. Having brought up reserves the 106th Infantry returned to the attack but failed to recapture this position.

During most of the day the 228th Guards Regiment, having been split from the rest of the division by the German penetration, fought alongside the 81st Guards. The Corps diary reported:

At 1130 the enemy in strength of up to five battalions of infantry with the support of 150 tanks and aircraft broke through the forward edge of defense of the 233rd Guards Rifle Regiment and reached the line: eastern outskirts of Sevriukovo, Point 215.5, Point +1.0, Hill 212.1, northern outskirts of Blizhniaia Igumenka... 228th Guards Rifle Regiment, which was operating in the 81st Guards Rifle Division's sector, after the breakthrough of the 81st Guards Rifle Division's left flank, was withdrawn into the second echelon and took up a defense on the western outskirts of Nikolskoe.

Later in the day units of the 94th Guards Division began to arrive from the march, as did the 148th Separate Tank Regiment and the 31st Antitank Artillery Brigade; despite this the 81st Guards and the 228th Guards Regiment wound up in semi-encirclement by the end of the day.

At the start of the following day the 223rd and 225th Guards Regiments were intermingled with the 73rd Guards along the line from the "Solovev" State Farm – 1.5 km to 2 km east of "Batratskaia Dacha" State Farm – Hill 209.7 – "Poliana" State Farm. Overnight orders had been drawn up for an ambitious counterattack by most of 7th Guards Army that would have involved the division attacking between "Batratskaia Dacha" and Gremiachii toward Krutoi Log before being relieved by the 270th and 111th Rifle Divisions attached to 24th Guards Rifle Corps, to reorganize. While this counterattack regained little ground through the day it effectively tied down the 7th Panzer and 106th Infantry. On the other hand the division's morale was being impacted by the continuous combat; over July 7 and 8 the blocking detachments of the 92nd NKVD Rifle Regiment reported having detained 339 men of the division. As of July 9 it recorded a personnel strength of 4,981 men; remaining equipment included just 3 heavy and 19 medium mortars (plus 13 of 50 mm calibre), 6 45 mm antitank guns, 18 76 mm and 3 122 mm guns.

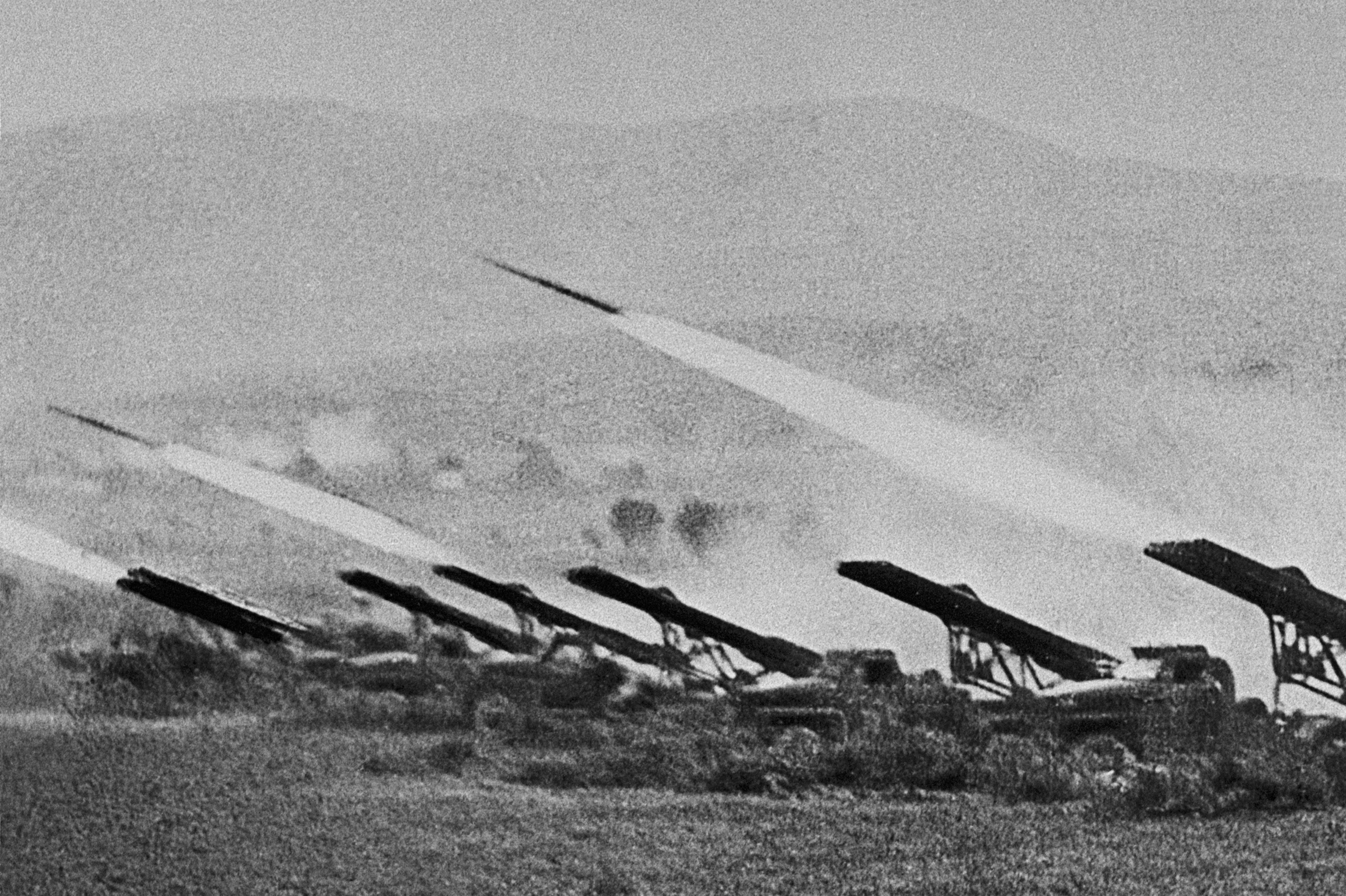
A battery of M-13 Katyusha launchers firing at enemy targets, 1943

By the morning of July 10 the division, which had not been relieved, had its 228th Regiment at Nikolskoe with the 223rd and 225th, still mixed with the 73rd Guards, on a line from Hill 209.6 to Korenskaia Dacha to 500 m south of Gremiachii. At this point in the battle the III Panzer Corps was pressing north between the Donets and the Razumnaia rivers and the division's sector was no longer under heavy attack. The 228th was ordered to move up and attack toward "Batratskaia Dacha" Farm at 1000 hours but soon came under heavy fire from Nebelwerfers and became pinned down in an orchard. The commander of the 15th Guards Rifle Division's 44th Guards Regiment was ordered to attack towards the farm with two of his battalions. Lt. Col. Usikov now deployed his fire support effectively and the attack began well, catching units of the 7th Panzer during a redeployment. During the afternoon the 15th Guards, reinforced with a regiment of 73rd Guards, forced the panzergrenadiers back while General Safiulin ordered the 97th Guards Mortar Regiment to support the attack with rocket fire. At 1855 hours five launchers fired a salvo of 78 M-13 (4.9 kg of high explosive each) at a concentration of German infantry and armor in the area of the woods 1,000 m west of "Batratskaia Dacha" Farm which "blanketed" the target. The 228th Guards then joined the attack to mop up the farm area, but this was unable to make headway.

Late on July 11 Shumilov ordered the 78th Guards to be withdrawn into reserve. The 223rd and 225th Regiments took up a line in Corps' second echelon from Nekliudovo to Pentsevo to Churaevo while the 228th Regiment and a battery of the 158th Artillery Regiment were to continue to hold positions along the eastern outskirts of "Batratskaia Dacha" Farm covering the boundary between the 15th and 73rd Guards Divisions. It therefore missed action in the counterattack launched by 7th Guards Army on July 12, the same day that Hitler decided to suspend the offensive. From July 5-10 the division had lost 3,656 men, of which 1,005 were killed and 1,445 missing-in-action, the highest losses among the divisions of the Army. As an indication of the impact of these losses and their replacements, later in the month it was noted that the division's personnel were now 60 percent Russian and 40 percent of several Asian nationalities. These sacrifices did not go unrewarded. On July 19 the 225th and 228th Guards Rifle Regiments were each awarded the Order of the Red Banner.

== Into Ukraine ==
By the beginning of August, in preparation for the strategic offensive into Ukraine, the 7th Guards Army was transferred to Steppe Front; the 78th Guards remained in 25th Guards Corps. It advanced toward the Dniepr River during the Poltava-Kremenchug Offensive in September; in anticipation of a crossing operation General Skvortsov, using intelligence data, outlined the locations of possible crossings in advance. On the night of September 24/25 the forward detachments of the division reached the river and began searching for and constructing rafts and other improvised means to gain the west bank near the village of Domotkan in the Dnipropetrovsk Oblast. By 0600 hours the 225th Regiment, with 6 76 mm regimental guns and 4 45 mm antitank guns, had made the crossing. By the day's end most of the division had also reached the far side and was organized into a large and well-defended bridgehead. For his leadership in this operation Skvortsov was made a Hero of the Soviet Union on October 26, along with 31 of his soldiers. As of the beginning of October the division had been transferred to the 24th Guards Corps, still in 7th Guards Army, but later in the month returned to 25th Guards Corps, about the time Steppe Front was renamed 2nd Ukrainian Front.

On November 13 the Front gained small bridgeheads on both sides of Cherkassy and quickly expanded the northern one until it threatened to engulf the city and tear open the front of the German 8th Army. Through most of December and into January, 1944 the Front was generally engaged in attrition battles. During December the division was transferred to the 64th Rifle Corps of 57th Army. On December 18 General Skvortsov was evacuated to a hospital in Moscow due to a respiratory ailment and was replaced the next day by Maj. Gen. Aleksandr Grigorevich Motov. After his release from hospital Skvortsov attended the Voroshilov Academy for over a year, following which he commanded the 26th Rifle Corps and the 11th Guards Rifle Corps before dying of tuberculosis in 1948.

In January, 1944 the 78th Guards was moved to the 53rd Army, still in 2nd Ukrainian Front, where it served as a separate rifle division. This Army was not directly involved in the encirclement battle around Korsun-Shevchenkovskii but advanced south of the pocket in the direction of Zlatopil. In February the division joined the Army's 26th Guards Rifle Corps but in March, during the Uman–Botoșani Offensive, it was again reassigned, now to Maj. Gen. P. I. Fomenko's 21st Guards Rifle Corps in 4th Guards Army, in the same Front.

=== First Jassy–Kishinev Offensive ===
The 78th Guards, leading the 69th and 80th Guards Rifle Divisions of the 21st Guards Corps, arrived at the Dniestr River near the villages of Zhura and Mikhailovka, 13 km northeast of Susleni, late on April 2. At dawn the next day the division assaulted across the river, leading to a three-day battle with forward elements of the 3rd Panzer Division defending security outposts in the Bulaeshty region, 6–8 km north of Susleni; the 78th was soon joined by the 69th and 80th Guards in this fighting. It wasn't until midday on April 5 that the Corps' forces were able to drive the panzer troops back to their Susleni strongpoint. Meanwhile, the five divisions of the 20th Guards Rifle Corps attacked towards Orhei and Chișinău but gained only 3–5 km against stiffening German resistance from the XXXX and XXXXVII Panzer Corps. The history of 4th Guards Army described the difficulties during its advance:

Overcoming the increasing enemy resistance became more difficult because our forces had inadequate artillery support and ammunition. Of the army's 700 guns no more than 200 of them were in their firing positions. The remainder lagged behind... No less difficult was the process of supplying ammunition to the artillery... We used every conceivable means of transport, including carrying the shells forward by hand.

Despite the many daunting problems caused by the spring rasputitsa, on April 5 the Army commander, Lt. Gen. I. V. Galanin, resumed the offensive. Four divisions of 20th Guards Corps assaulted the defenses of the 13th and 3rd Panzer Divisions west and north of Orhei but made only modest gains in heavy fighting. The next day the 5th Guards Airborne and 41st Guards managed to seize the city but the arrival of the 11th Panzer Division halted any further advance. Marshal I. S. Konev, the Front commander, was determined to take Chișinău and on April 8 Galanin ordered his two Guards corps to assault and crush the positions of 3rd Panzer south of Susleni. Over two days the German defenses were pounded by artillery and mortar fire and repeated ground assaults but XXXX Panzer Corps threw in reserves to stabilise the situation. On April 10 and 11 Galanin reinforced the see-saw battle for the Orhei bridgehead with the 69th and 80th Guards but his move was met by the 14th Panzer Division which joined the German counterattacks. Overnight on April 12/13 most of the Panzer Corps withdrew south of the Reut River where the 69th Guards already held a bridgehead and its Corps-mates soon linked up to expand this lodgement to about 11 km in width and as much as 5 km in depth. But by now the 4th Guards Army was so depleted from months of fighting that it was no longer capable of offensive operations; the 78th Guards, like the Army's other divisions, was down to roughly 5,000 personnel. On April 18 Konev authorized Galanin to go over to the defense. During the following week Konev ordered the division to be transferred to the 5th Guards Army, commanded by Lt. Gen. A. S. Zhadov. This Army had made one failed attempt to break out of its bridgehead over the Dniestr at Tașlîc and Konev was determined to make another effort. The divisional history states:

Our division was alerted at midnight on [April 19], and after conducting a night march, it reached the village of Susleny on the morning of 20 April. After crossing the Dnestr, we marched 98 kilometres to the northwest through Gainy [and then southeastward] and concentrated in the region of the village of Tashlyk by 0500 hours on 23 April, where we became subordinate to the 5th Guards Army's 33rd Guards Rifle Corps. At 1100 hours on 23 April, the division crossed the Dnestr into the bridgehead... and entered combat on the heights southwest of Pugacheny from the march... Dense and acrid smoke swirled in the skies, and under its cover, enemy tanks and infantry moved toward the guardsmen's positions. However, together with the units of the 5th Guards Army, the soldiers of the 78th Guards not only held on to the bridgehead but also considerably expanded it in width and depth.

By the beginning of May the division had been transferred to the 75th Rifle Corps, still in 5th Guards Army, but later that month it returned to 33rd Guards Corps. In June it was removed to the Reserve of the Supreme High Command for rebuilding, along with the rest of 5th Guards Army, before being reassigned to the 1st Ukrainian Front in July. The division would remain under these commands for the duration of the war.

=== Lvov-Sandomierz Offensive ===
The Front launched this offensive on July 13 but the Army did not enter the operation until early August. By the end of August 3 it had concentrated in the Kolbuszowa region and was ordered to exploit the 3rd Guards Tank and 13th Armies' crossings over the Vistula in the Baranów Sandomierski area. 5th Guards Army was to develop the offensive along the Busko-Zdrój axis and General Zhadov directed the 33rd Guards Corps to make its attack toward Mielec, which began at 1500 hours on August 4. During intense fighting the Corps defeated the German Mielec grouping, forced a crossing of the Wisłoka River, and reached a line to the west of the city by the end of August 6. While the 32nd and 34th Guards Rifle Corps entered the existing bridgehead the 33rd forced a new crossing to the south, in recognition of which the 78th Guards was awarded the honorific "Vistula".

During this crossing operation and the fighting that followed Maj. Ivan Antonovich Ternavskii distinguished himself and became a Hero of the Soviet Union. A prewar junior officer of artillery he had fought from the start of the German invasion, primarily in the 500th Artillery Regiment of the 199th Rifle Division, before joining the 158th Guards Artillery prior to Kursk. Commanding one of its three battalions he skilfully controlled its fire during the landings and during the battles up to August 22 was responsible for the destruction of three mortar batteries, 23 machine gun posts, five observation posts and two antitank guns, while his gunners also suppressed or damaged many other targets. He would be awarded his Gold Star on September 23. In February 1945, as a result of his leadership in fighting at Brzeg, he would be nominated for a second Gold Star, but was awarded a second Order of the Red Banner instead. Ternavskii continued to serve in the Red (later Soviet) Army until 1956, reaching the rank of lieutenant colonel, and died on January 19, 1995.

Near the end of this fighting two regiments of the division were awarded honorifics:

DEMBITSA... 225th Guards Rifle Regiment (Lt. Colonel Orlyanskii, Dmitrii Konstantinovich)... 158th Guards Artillery Regiment (Major Demchenko, Viktor Vasilevich)... The troops who participated in the liberation of Dembitsa, by the order of the Supreme High Command of 23 August 1944, and a commendation in Moscow, are given a salute of 12 artillery salvoes from 124 guns.

In addition, on September 7 the 81st Guards Antitank Battalion would be awarded the Order of Bogdan Khmelnitsky, 3rd Degree, for its role in the battle for this town.

== Into Poland and Germany ==
1st Ukrainian Front launched its part of the Vistula-Oder Offensive on January 12, 1945. 5th Guards Army was assigned a 6 km-wide breakthrough front, with up to 282 guns and mortars and 23 tanks and self-propelled guns per kilometre. The 4th Guards and 31st Tank Corps were to be committed on the first day to complete the breach of the German main defensive zone. The breakthrough and exploitation went largely as planned and by January 22 the Front's main group of forces, which included the 5th Guards Army, was arriving along the Oder River along a broad front in the general area of Lissa, although the Army was lagging about 20 km behind, threatening the link between the main group and the left flank armies. In response the Army was redirected towards the Oder northwest of Oppeln and reached there by day's end and captured the city the next day in cooperation with the 3rd Guards Tank and 21st Armies. The 33rd Guards Corps, along with the 32nd and 34th, were deployed in a single echelon and by January 28 had seized three substantial bridgeheads over the river. In recognition of this success the 228th Guards Rifle Regiment was granted the honorific "Oder".

=== Lower Silesian Offensive ===
In the first days of February the 78th Guards again forced the Oder and took part in the capture of Brzeg. Overnight on February 5/6 a German force numbering about 2,500 infantry, supported by six tanks and four armored cars, surrounded the town while attempting to break out to the west. This grouping was largely destroyed or driven off by the 158th Guards Artillery with the loss of three 105 mm guns, 21 motor vehicles, 20 loaded carts, 47 horses and 210 soldiers and officers, while a further 200 were taken prisoner.

Beginning on February 8 the 5th Guards Army took part in the Front's Lower Silesian Offensive with its main objective of encircling the German garrison of Breslau. On its sector the offensive was based on the bridgehead seized by 14th Guards Rifle Division in January. The German defense was based on the 269th Infantry Division with several battlegroups, five independent battalions, two panzer battalions and an NCO school. The Army's attack was led by 32nd Guards Rifle Corps and developed slowly over the first three days in large part due to the large number of fortified villages to be overcome and the ammunition shortage faced by all Soviet forces after the breakneck advance through Poland. On February 11 Marshal Konev shifted the 31st Tank Corps from 21st Army and committed it on the sector of 33rd Guards Corps the next day with the immediate objective of capturing the Bogenau area.

On February 13 the Army's offensive developed more successfully than in the preceding days. German resistance did not abate and if anything increased as further forces entered the Breslau area but despite this the 4th Guards and 31st Tank Corps linked up with the 7th Guards Mechanized Corps of 6th Army to complete the encirclement. Konev chose to leave 6th Army to maintain the siege while the 32nd and 33rd Guards Corps were ordered to make a decisive attack from the Magnitz area toward Koberwitz and then to the southwest. During the fighting on February 15 the width of the cordon between Breslau and the main German forces was increased to up to 13 km. By the end of February 17 elements of the Army had arrived in the Liegnitz area, relieving the 3rd Guards Tank Army's 9th Mechanized Corps which then undertook a forced night march which brought it to Bober River in the Lewenberg area. On March 13 General Motov handed his command to Maj. Gen. Zakhar Trofimovich Trofimov. On April 5 the 225th Guards Rifle Regiment received the Order of Aleksandr Nevsky for its part in the battles for the Oder and Breslau.

=== Berlin Operation ===
By the start of the final offensive against the German capital the 33rd Guards Corps consisted of the 78th Guards, the 9th Guards Airborne Division and the 118th Rifle Division. 5th Guards Army was deployed along the east bank of the Neisse River on a 13 km front and planned to launch its main attack with its right wing on the 8 km sector from Gross Saerchen to Muskau. The 32nd and 34th Guards Corps were deployed in the first echelon while the 33rd Guards Corps was in second echelon, along with the 4th Guards Tank Corps. At this time the division, in common with most of those in the Army, had a personnel strength of roughly 5,200 men.

When the offensive began on April 16 the Army's main forces crossed the Neisse under the cover of massed artillery fire. By the end of the day the 33rd Guards Corps had concentrated in the area from Klein Zerchen to Kwolsdorf to Toepferstedt on the river's east bank. As the offensive continued the Army's right flank reached the Spree River by the end of April 18 but the Corps remained in its second echelon, now in the area of Jamlitz. The next day the Corps was committed along the Spremberg axis in the 32nd Guards Corps' sector and by evening all three divisions were fighting along the line from Graustein to Slamen in an effort to eliminate the German bridgehead east of this important resistance center. At 1100 hours on April 20, following a pair of 5-minute artillery preparations, the 78th Guards and its corps-mates began the storm of Spremberg which concluded with an advance of 5-6km by the end of the day. During this fighting Major Ternavskii again distinguished himself and would soon be awarded the Order of the Patriotic War, 1st Degree.

On April 21 the Corps linked up with the 13th Army's 24th Rifle Corps in the Neu Welzow area, completing the encirclement of the German Spremberg grouping. About 5,000 men were killed in the pocket including elements of Panzer-Führerbegleitdivision, 10th SS Panzer Division Frundsberg and 21st Panzer Division, plus 30 tanks and assault guns destroyed. The 78th Guards was soon assigned to secure the 5th Guards Army's nearly 100-km long left flank along a line from Weisswasser to Keula with its front facing south. Over the next two days a German force based on elements of 17th and 4th Panzer Armies launched a counteroffensive which broke through the 52nd Army's front along its boundary with the 2nd Polish Army and continued north in the general direction of Spremberg. To counter this effort, Konev ordered Zhadov to use the 33rd Guards Corps and the 14th Guards Division to attack towards Losa and Ugist (north of Bautzen) and reestablish contact with the Poles. This effort brought the German attack to a halt by the end of April 24.

During fighting on April 26 the 33rd Guards Corps advanced 3-4km to the south and reached a line from Biela to Schmerlitz to Neschwitz. During April 27-30 the German group of forces in the Görlitz area attempted to renew their counteroffensive but without success and finally went over to the defensive. From May 6-11 the 78th Guards took part, with the rest of 1st Ukrainian Front, in the final offensive on Prague.

== Postwar ==
The division ended the war north of Prague, with the title 78th Guards Rifle, Vistula Division. (Russian: 78-я гвардейская стрелковая Висленская дивизия.) On May 28 many of the division's subunits received decorations for the crossing of the Neisse: the 225th Guards Rifle and the 158th Guards Artillery Regiments were each awarded the Order of Bogdan Khmelnitsky, 2nd Degree; the 228th Guards Rifle Regiment won the Order of Aleksandr Nevsky; while the 89th Guards Sapper Battalion and the 107th Guards Signal Battalion both gained the Order of the Red Star. Finally, on June 4, the division as a whole was granted the Order of Suvorov, 2nd Degree, for its role in the operations near Dresden. The division remained under the command of General Trofimov until it was disbanded in July 1946.
