= Nizhny Olshanets =

Nizhny Olshanets Нижний Ольшанец
- Selo
- Location within Belgorod Oblast Location within Russia
- Coordinates: 50°29′N 36°41′E
- Country: Russia
- Region: Belgorod Oblast
- District: Belgorodsky District
- Time zone: UTC+3:00

Nizhny Olshanets (Russian: Нижний Ольшанец) is a rural locality (a selo) in Belgorodsky District, Belgorod Oblast, Russia. The population was 250 as of 2010. There are 22 streets.

== Geography ==
Nizhny Olshanets is located 27 km east of Maysky (the district's administrative centre) by road. Razumnoye is the nearest rural locality.
