= Prisaca =

Prisaca, Presaca, Prisăcani

Prisaca may refer to several villages in Romania:

- Prisaca, a village in Berești-Tazlău Commune, Bacău County
- Prisaca, a village in Uileacu de Beiuș Commune, Bihor County
- Prisaca, a village in Constantin Daicoviciu Commune, Caraș-Severin County
- Prisaca, a village in Vulpeni Commune, Olt County
- Prisaca, a village in Valea Sării Commune, Vrancea County
- Prisaca Dornei, a village in Vama Commune, Suceava County

and to:

- Prisaca, a village in Hîrtop Commune, Cimişlia district, Moldova

== See also ==
- Priseaca
