= Solomino =

Solomino Соломино
- Selo
- Location within Belgorod Oblast Location within Russia
- Coordinates: 50°30′N 36°38′E
- Country: Russia
- Region: Belgorod Oblast
- District: Belgorodsky District
- Time zone: UTC+3:00

Solomino (Russian: Соломино) is a rural locality (a selo) in Belgorodsky District, Belgorod Oblast, Russia. The population was 6 as of 2010. There are 34 streets.

== Geography ==
Solomino is located 21 km east of Maysky (the district's administrative centre) by road. Tavrovo is the nearest rural locality.
