= Caracui =

Village in Moldova, Close to a village called Orac

- Village
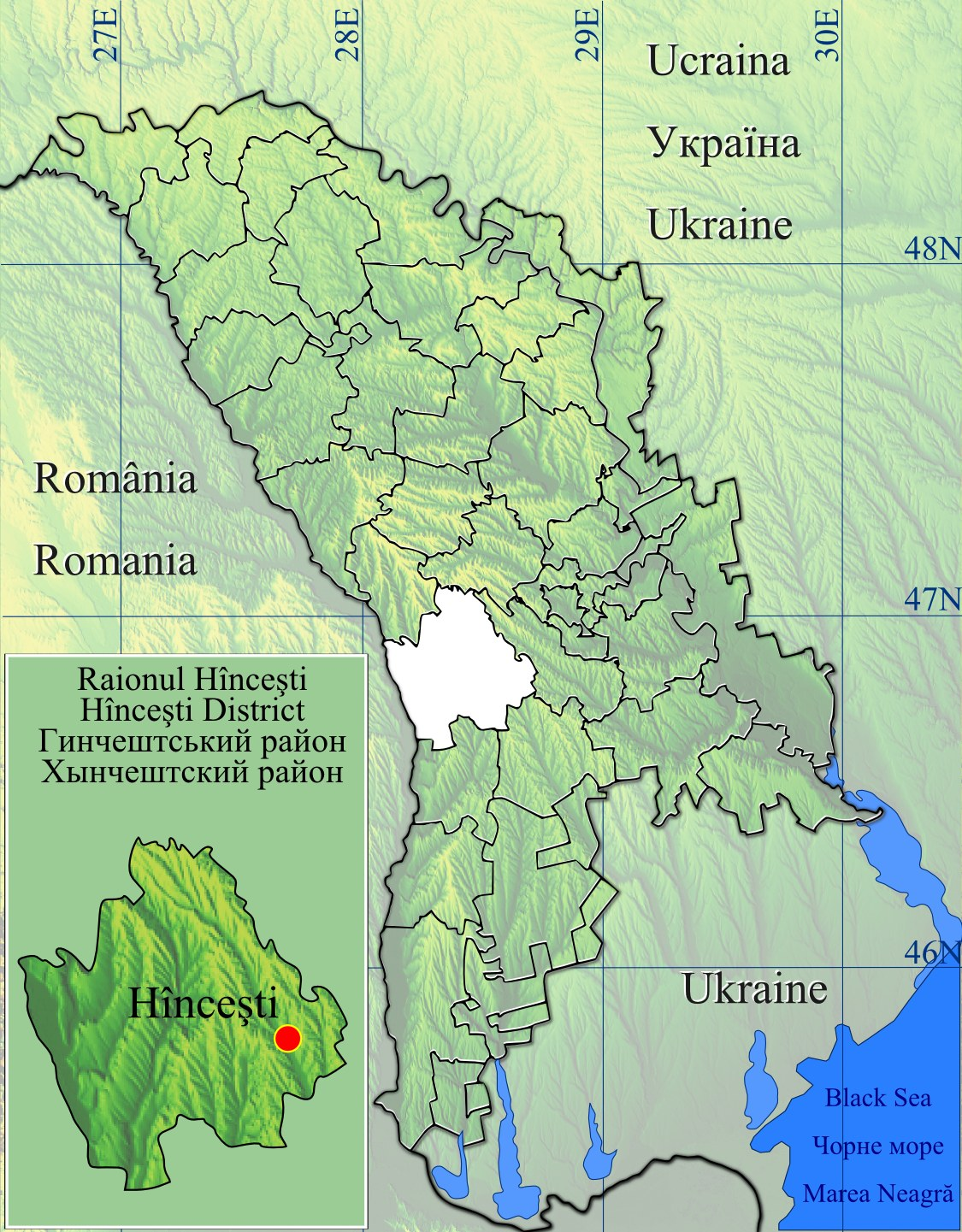
- Location within Hîncești
- Coordinates: 46°42′1″N 28°32′24″E
- Country: Moldova

Government
  - Mayor: Anatolie Dubceac (PLDM)

Population (2014 census)
  - Total: 2,316
- Time zone: UTC+2 (EET)
  - Summer (DST): UTC+3 (EEST)
- Postal code: MD-3419

Caracui is a village in Hîncești District, Moldova.
