= 38th Rifle Division =

- Active: 1st formation: 1918 – 1941; 2nd formation: 1942 – 1943; 3rd formation: 1943 – 1945
- Country: Soviet Union
- Branch: Red Army
- Type: Infantry
- Size: Division

The 38th Rifle Division (38-я стрелковая дивизия) was an infantry division of the Soviet Union's Red Army during World War II.

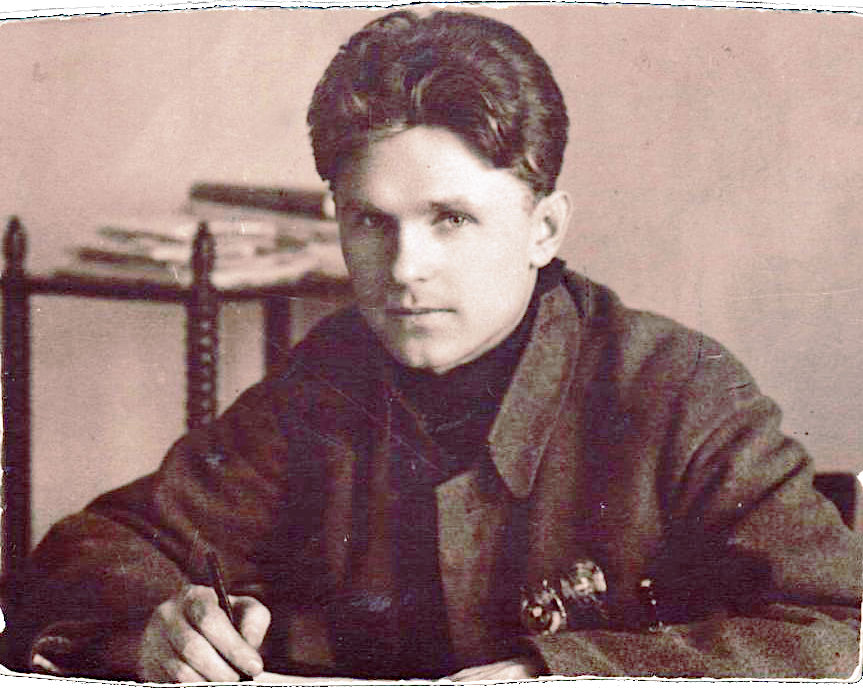
Pyotr Miroshnikov, commissar of the 9th Don Rifle Division, 1922-1924, Rostov.

Formed in 1918 as the 2nd Don Infantry Division. In February 1919, as part of the 1st Army, the Division took part in the fighting in the Urals and Bashkiria against the troops of Ataman Alexander Dutov. In 1920, it ensured the delivery of its troops from the Caucasus forest in Donbass. Then, as part of the 13th Army it led the fighting against the army of General Wrangel. Since October 1920 Division was fighting against Makhno gangs. In June 1922 it was renamed the 9th Don Rifle Division. In 1930, the division became part of the North Caucasus Military District. Headquartered in Rostov-on-Don, the division included units in Novocherkassk, Taganrog, and Zernograd. The division was renumbered as the 38th Don Red Banner Morozovsk-Donetsk Rifle Division named for A. I. Mikoyan in 1936. In August and September 1939 the 158th and 171st Rifle Divisions were formed from regiments of the division.

In June 1941 it became part of the 19th Army, formed in the North Caucasus Military District under General Lieutenant Ivan Konev. It was wiped out at Vyazma in October 1941. Recreated at Alma Ata in January 1942, fought at Stalingrad and became 73rd Guards Rifle Division in March 1943. Created again at Kutaisi 4.43, fought on the Dnieper River and at Targul Frumos. While with 40th Army, took part in the Battle of Debrecen in October 1944. With 2nd Ukrainian Front 5.45.

The division was disbanded in the summer of 1945 in the Southern Group of Forces.
