= Gremyachy, Belgorod Oblast =

Gremyachy Гремячий
- Khutor
- Location within Belgorod Oblast Location within Russia
- Coordinates: 50°31′N 36°49′E
- Country: Russia
- Region: Belgorod Oblast
- District: Shebekinsky District
- Time zone: UTC+3:00

Gremyachy (Russian: Гремячий) is a rural locality (a khutor) in Shebekinsky District, Belgorod Oblast, Russia. The population was 41 as of 2010. There are 7 streets.

== Geography ==
Gremyachy is located 25 km north of Shebekino (the district's administrative centre) by road. Koshlakovo is the nearest rural locality.
