= Churayevo, Belgorod Oblast =

Churayevo Чураево
- Selo
- Location within Belgorod Oblast Location within Russia
- Coordinates: 50°29′N 36°52′E
- Country: Russia
- Region: Belgorod Oblast
- District: Shebekinsky District
- Time zone: UTC+3:00

Churayevo (Russian: Чураево) is a rural locality (a selo) and the administrative center of Churayevskoye Rural Settlement, Shebekinsky District, Belgorod Oblast, Russia. The population was 758 as of 2010. There are 15 streets.

== Geography ==
Churayevo is located 11 km north of Shebekino (the district's administrative centre) by road. Koshlakovo is the nearest rural locality.
