= Hîrtop, Cimișlia =

Hîrtop
- Commune
- Location within Moldova
- Coordinates: 46.6516666667°N 28.6883333333°E
- Country: Moldova
- District: Cimișlia District

Population (2014)
  - Total: 1,974
- Time zone: UTC+2 (EET)
  - Summer (DST): UTC+3 (EEST)

Hîrtop is a commune in Cimișlia District, Moldova. It is composed of three villages: Hîrtop, Ialpug and Prisaca.
