= 82-PM-41 =

WW2 Soviet infantry mortar

82-mm mortar Model 1941
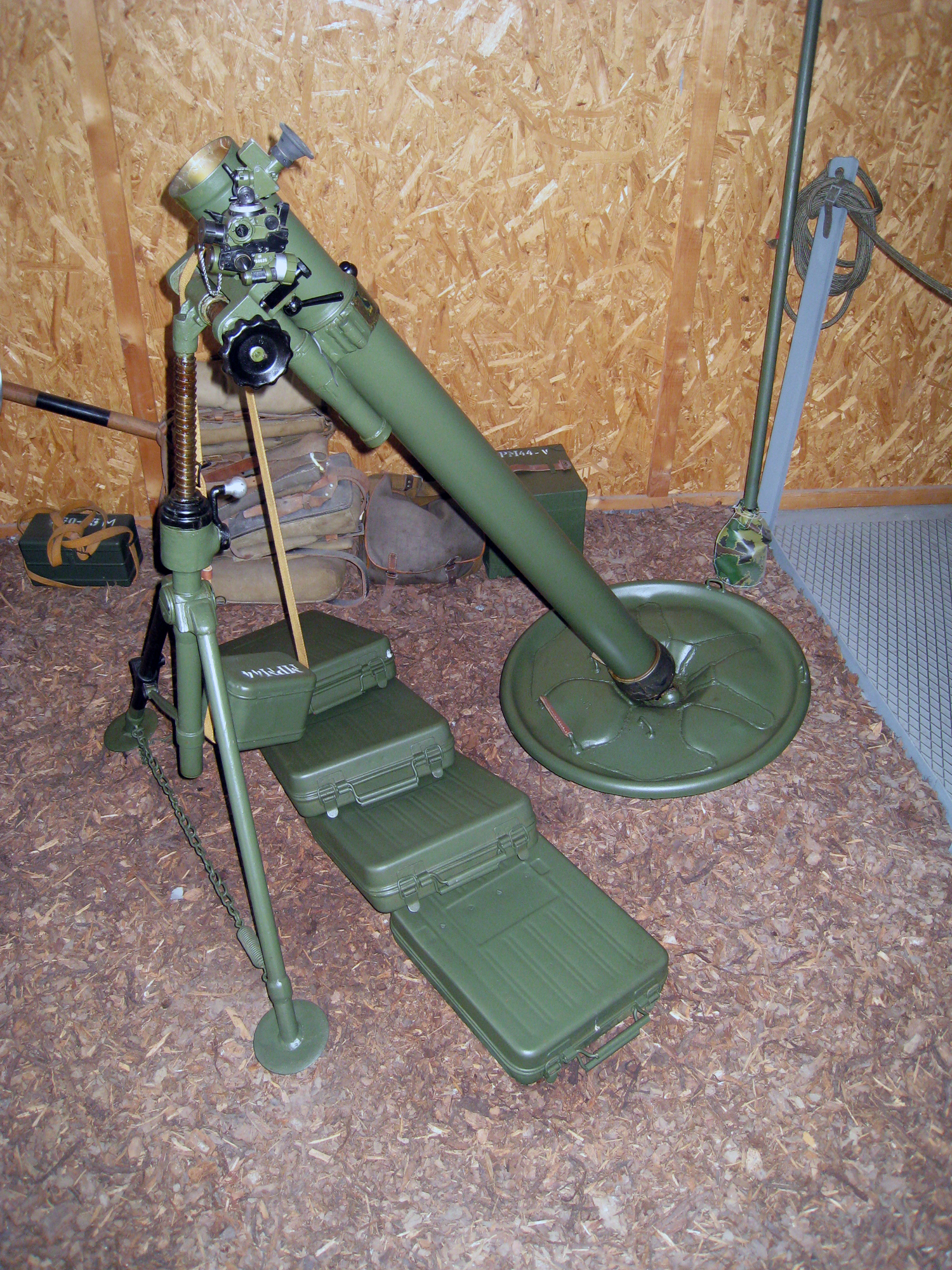
- 82-mm mortar Model 1941
- Type: Mortar
- Place of origin: Soviet Union

Service history
- In service: 1941–1990s
- Used by: Soviet Union; Other users
- Wars: Second World War; Korean War; Vietnam War; Cambodian Civil War; Lebanese Civil War; Portuguese Colonial War; South African Border War

Production history
- Designed: 1940–1941
- Produced: 1941–1943

Specifications
- Mass: 56 kilograms (123 lb)
- Length: 1.2 metres (3 ft 11 in)
- Crew: 4
- Shell weight: 3.05 kg (6 lb 12 oz)
- Caliber: 82 millimetres (3.2 in)
- Elevation: 45° to 85°
- Traverse: 5° to 25° (using traversing mechanism)
- Rate of fire: 15-25 rpm
- Muzzle velocity: 211 m/s (690 ft/s)
- Maximum firing range: 3,040 m (3,320 yd)
- Sights: MPB-82

The 82-PM-41 (Russian: 82-Полевой Миномёт-41), M-41 or the 82-mm mortar Model 1941 (Russian: 82-мм миномет обр. 1941 г.) was a Soviet 82-millimeter calibre mortar developed during the Second World War as an infantry battalion mortar, and which began production in 1941.

== Design ==
It differed from the Model 1937 by the presence of a removable wheel base, by the arched construction base plate (as in 107-mm and 120-mm mortars), and also a different two-legged construction. Wheels were slipped over the semi-axis of the bipod feet and removed during firing.

Design improvements were made to reduce weight and production cost, and improve manoeuvrability. The ballistic data of the Model 1941 mortar were analogous to the Model 1937. The 82-mm mortar Model 1941 was more convenient to transport than the Model 1937, but was less steady during firing and had a worse centre of gravity.

To correct shortcomings of the 82-mm mortar Model 1941, it was modernised during initial production; the construction of the bipod, wheel and fastening of the sight was changed. The modernised mortar was called the 82-mm mortar Model 1943.

== Usage ==
Due to the initial need to rectify design issues, 1937 Model mortars continued to be used during World War II and produced alongside Models 1941 and 1943. As many Model 1937 Mortars were lost early in the war, this mortar served in the Battle for Moscow, Battle of Stalingrad, Battle of Kursk, and other campaigns, operations and engagements of the first three years of the war. The German designation for captured M-41 mortars was 8.2 cm GrW 274/3(r).

== Users ==
- Albania
- Cambodia
- Cape Verde
- People's Republic of China
- Republic of the Congo
- Cuba
- Cyprus
- Czechoslovakia
- Finland
- Guinea-Bissau
- Namibia
- Nazi Germany
- Mongolia
- Poland
- East Germany
- North Korea
- Somalia
- Soviet Union
- Sudan
- Syria
- Russia
- Togo
- Vietnam
- Yugoslavia
