= Razumnoye =

Urban locality in Belgorod Oblast, Russia

Razumnoye Разумное
- Urban-type settlement
- Interactive map of Razumnoye
- Location within Belgorod Oblast Location within European Russia Location within Russia
- Coordinates: 50°32′07″N 36°42′05″E
- Country: Russia
- Federal subject: Belgorod Oblast
- Elevation: 145 m (476 ft)

Population (2010 Census)
  - Total: 16,600
  - Estimate (2025): 28,878 (+74%)
- Time zone: UTC+3 (MSK)
- Postal code: 308510
- OKTMO ID: 14610165051

Razumnoye (Russian: Разу́мное) is an urban-type settlement in Belgorodsky District of Belgorod Oblast, Russia. Population: 28,192 (2021 census); 16,600 (2010 census); 15,332 (2002 census); 10,727 (1989 Soviet census).
