= 422nd Rifle Division =

- Active: 1941–1943
- Country: Soviet Union
- Branch: Red Army
- Type: Division
- Role: Infantry
- Engagements: Battle of Stalingrad; Operation Uranus; Operation Ring

Commanders
- Notable commanders: Col. Rodion Nikanorovich Shabalin; Maj. Gen. Ivan Konstantinovich Morozov

The 422nd Rifle Division was formed for the first time as a standard Red Army rifle division late in 1941, after the Soviet winter counteroffensive had begun, but was soon re-designated. A second formation began in March, 1942, again in the far east of Siberia, until July, after which it was moved west to join the reserves of Stalingrad Front in August. It was the highest-numbered rifle division to see active service in the front lines after the German invasion, Operation Barbarossa. Over the course of the next six months, the division distinguished itself in both defensive and offensive fighting and earned its re-designation as the 81st Guards Rifle Division on the first day of March, 1943. The 422nd was never reformed.

== 1st Formation ==
The early history of the 422nd Rifle Division is a convoluted tale. A new rifle division began forming on December 1, 1941, in the Far Eastern Front. It was originally designated as the 397th Rifle Division, but was only partly formed when it was re-designated as the 422nd on December 25. Col. Rodion Nikanorovich Shabalin was appointed to command on the same date. Most 400-series rifle divisions ended up being re-designated prior to reaching the front, and in this case the division was re-re-designated while still forming up on January 14, 1942, now as the 2nd formation of the 397th Rifle Division, with Colonel Shabalin still in command.

== 2nd Formation ==
The second 422nd Rifle Division began forming on March 4, 1942, at Bikin in the Far Eastern Front, primarily from reservists in the Primorsky and Ussuri regions of the Far East, near Vladivostok. It was assigned to 35th Army as it continued to form up until July. The division's primary order of battle was as follows:

- 1326th Rifle Regiment
- 1334th Rifle Regiment
- 1392nd Rifle Regiment
- 1061st Artillery Regiment

The new division began moving west by rail in July, assigned to the reserves of Stalingrad Front by August 1. By August 15 it arrived on the Don River at Tundutovo, assigned to 57th Army south of Stalingrad. As a fresh division it was badly needed in the face of the offensive drive from the south by XXXXVIII Panzer Corps of 4th Panzer Army. On August 21, that army tried to renew its offensive by driving a wedge between the 57th and the adjoining 64th Army. 15th Guards Rifle Division, holding the 57th Army flank, was reinforced by the 422nd, and between them fought the 24th Panzer Division to a standstill short of Tundutovo Station; the Red Army General Staff report claimed 60 enemy tanks destroyed by units of the 57th Army that day. On August 23-24, 4th Panzer Army again regrouped, lunging northwards early on the 25th along the boundary of the 422nd and the 244th Rifle Divisions and advancing 8 kilometres to the Chervlennaia River. Once there, however, concentrated artillery and mortar fire of the two divisions, joined by 15th Guards, separated the German tanks from their infantry, while heavy antitank fire and counterattacks by 6th Tank Brigade destroyed or damaged many panzers. The remainder had no choice but to fall back to their jumping-off positions by the end of August 26.

After 62nd Army was cut off in Stalingrad in early September, the 422nd remained in the so-called Beketovka bridgehead on the west bank of the Volga, south of the city. In the middle of the month the division was transferred from 57th to 64th Army to take part in a second offensive towards Kotluban; on September 19 it was reported (less the 1334th Rifle Regiment) as "fighting along the southern outskirts of Kuporosnoe and the southeastern edge of Quadrilateral Grove." A further effort was made overnight on October 1-2 with five rifle divisions and a naval rifle brigade against the German 371st Infantry Division; the results were described by Colonel Morozov of the division as follows:

"Day and night, the divisions of 64th Army fought their way to the north to link up with 62nd Army, but the distance between the armies scarcely diminished."

While gaining little ground, these attacks distracted German Sixth Army from the battle in Stalingrad itself.

Meanwhile, the detached 1334th Rifle Regiment, under command of Lt. Col. Grigory Skiruta, was in 57th Army as part of a composite detachment with 115th Rifle Regiment. and 155th Tank Brigade, supported by 1188th Antitank Artillery Regiment plus 18th and 76th Guards Mortar Regiments. Under instructions from Gen. A.M. Vasilevsky this detachment assaulted the positions of the Romanian 1st Infantry Division south of Lake Sarpa overnight on September 28-29. The attack achieved almost immediate success, penetrating the Romanian defenses, advancing roughly 5 kilometres, and liberating the villages of Tsatsa and Semkin by 1400 hours on October 1. As a result of this attack, as well as a similar one by 51st Army, the Romanian VI Army Corps was badly damaged and forced back to even less defensible positions. The German 14th Panzer Division was ordered to intervene, and while it stabilized the situation, it was unable to retake the lost ground and was deflected from its planned missions to either advance towards Astrakhan or to reinforce the battle in Stalingrad. The German high command was also given dire warning of the weakness of its Romanian allies holding the flanks of Sixth Army.

The full 422nd made a second effort to break through to Stalingrad on October 25 at 0900 hours, and over the course of the day the division gained a foothold in the southern half of Kuporosnoe, but despite a renewal of the fighting on the 27th, the attack stalled there.

== Operation Uranus ==
In preparation for the strategic counteroffensive called Operation Uranus, the 422nd was transferred to 57th Army in early November and moved southwards, once again to the vicinity of Tundutovo, and reinforced. For the offensive it was supported by 235th Tank Brigade and 176th Separate Tank Regiment, and made up about half of 57th Army's shock group, with the 169th Rifle Division and more armor making up the other half. After a 75-minute artillery preparation the division stepped off at 1115 hours on November 20 and easily penetrated the defenses of the under-strength Romanian 2nd Infantry Division, which suffered "tank fright" and was virtually routed in the first hour. By mid-afternoon the shock group had advanced 6 to 8 kilometres and had captured 54-km Station on the rail line from Abganerovo. Continuing to advance to the village of Koshary, the supporting 176th Tank Regiment stumbled into a Romanian mine field and had 24 of its 28 tanks knocked out. In the evening the division came under attack by the German 29th Motorized Division, which drove it back from the town of Nariman. 13th Tank Corps soon entered this seesaw battle through the night and next day, until the German division was ordered northward towards Stalingrad, after which the 422nd and its supporting tanks continued to exploit their penetration westwards. Within days the shock group ran up against the 29th Motorized once again, now defending the strongpoints of Tsybenko and Kravtsov, and the advance became a siege.

== Operation Ring ==
In the early days of the siege, the division was transferred back to 64th Army, but on December 18 was moved again westwards to 57th Army, along with some tank units. According to Glantz, there is evidence that the STAVKA was "reading Sixth Army's mail" in some fashion, and was anticipating a breakout in this sector as the German forces in Operation Winter Storm drew closer. It was also indicative that 29th Motorized was shifting westwards at the same time. In the event, due to the failure of Winter Storm, and the practical inability of the trapped German forces to move, the 422nd, along with the rest of Don Front, maintained the siege.

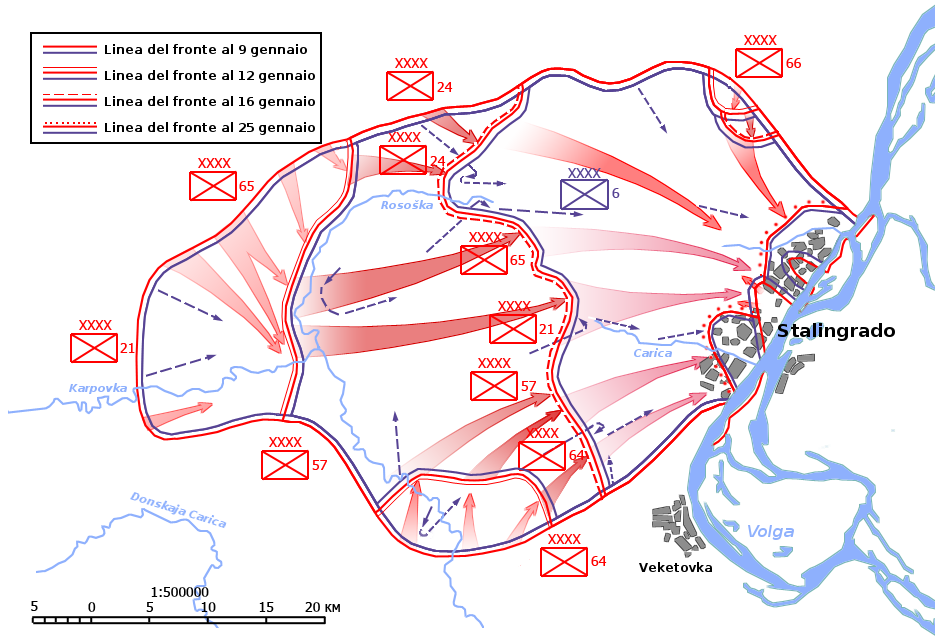
Operation Ring

In the final planning for Operation Ring, the division was paired with 38th Rifle Division as the shock group of 57th Army, supported by 254th Tank Brigade and 234th Separate Tank Regiment. Its initial objectives were the German strongholds of Kravtsov, Tsybenko, and Hill 117.4., north of Kravtsov. On January 10, 1943, the first day of the offensive, the 422nd punched through the defenses of the German 297th Infantry Division and enveloped the battalion of the 670th Regiment defending Tsybenko from the west. This allowed the 254th Tank Brigade to exploit the penetration to part of Gornaia Poliana State Farm, more than a kilometre in the rear of German IV Corps. The few reserves of that corps were used up in futile attempts to close this and other breaches and rescue the forces isolated in Tsybenko, and two days later the 422nd took control of that fortified position. The division continued its attack on January 13, taking the strongpoint at Kravtsov from another battalion of the 297th Infantry, then advancing west and northwest towards Hill 115.2 and Rakotino, both of which were weakly defended by the 767th Regiment of the 376th Infantry Division. Rakotino was enveloped from the northwest, rendering it untenable, and the division soon liberated these positions as well. On January 14, the 422nd advanced again against the 376th Infantry, capturing the town of Skliarov and rolling up the Germans' left wing in the process. Meanwhile, other Soviet forces drove deep into the 376th's rear, trapping it southwest of Basargino Station. Late that evening, a staff officer of Army Group Don commented in its war diary that "376th ID seems to have been broken up." Nearly all of its combat troops died in place or surrendered within days, while its support elements withdrew eastwards.

After a pause, Operation Ring resumed on January 18. Returning from a few days of rest and replenishment, the 422nd turned its attentions once again to the 297th Infantry on January 22, advancing with the 15th Guards and the 38th Rifle Division north and south of the railroad from Kalach-na-Donu, taking Alekseevka Station and Voroponovo Station by evening and sending the remnants of the German division reeling back towards Verkhnaia Elshanka. On the following day, the three rifle divisions continued advancing eastwards as much as six kilometres into southern Stalingrad against fading German resistance. On January 25, the 422nd helped to retake Stalingrad Railroad Station No. 2, then wheeled north to cut off the withdrawing remnants of German IV Corps, prompting the commander of the 297th Infantry, with most of his few remaining troops, to surrender to the 38th Rifle Division by nightfall.

There was a further brief pause in the operation, then fighting resumed, now in the ruins of downtown Stalingrad. On January 29 the 422nd and its two companion divisions, joined by 143rd Rifle Brigade, advanced up to 800 metres on converging axes and reached positions from Salskaia Street east to the vicinity of Stalingrad Railroad Station No. 1. Shortly after dawn, the commander of the 376th Infantry Division, General Edler von Daniels, sent a representative to Colonel Morozov, offering the unconditional surrender of his remaining 3,000 men. In addition to von Daniels, the division also captured the chief of Sixth Army's medical services, and a total of 16 colonels. Following this, the division resumed its advance towards the city's center. On the same day, the headquarters and supporting elements of 57th Army were withdrawn from Don Front for redeployment elsewhere, and the 422nd was assigned back to 64th Army. On January 30 this army's forces reached the heart of the city's downtown and set the stage for the surrender of Field Marshal Paulus and the staff of Sixth Army. En route, the division liberated Hospital No. 2, the regional Communist Party headquarters, where 300 Soviet prisoners of war were freed, and finally Railroad Station No. 1. Paulus surrendered to the 38th Motor Rifle Brigade the following day, and on February 1 the 422nd began assisting in liquidating small parties and individual German hold-outs, a task which continued for about two weeks.

The 64th Army, along with the 62nd and 66th Armies, were retained in or near the city, as part of General Trufanov's operational group of forces on February 5. During the remainder of the month these armies and their troops were rebuilt and replenished for future operations. On February 27 the 64th Army was reassigned to the Stalingrad Group of Forces, and on the following day was dispatched to Voronezh Front. In recognition of their prowess both on the defense and on the attack, on March 1 the men and women of the division were raised to Guards status as the 81st Guards Rifle Division. On the same date, divisional commander Colonel Morozov was promoted to the rank of Major General. On April 16, 64th Army became the 7th Guards Army.
