= 81st Guards Rifle Division =

81st Guards Rifle Division (March 1, 1943 – June 4, 1957) 81st Guards Motor Rifle Division (June 4, 1957 – June 1, 2009)
- Active: 1943–2009
- Country: Soviet Union; Russia
- Branch: Red Army (1943–1946); Soviet Army (1946–1991); Russian Ground Forces (1991–present)
- Type: Division
- Role: Infantry
- Engagements: World War II; Battle of Kursk; Belgorod-Khar'kov Offensive Operation; Battle of the Dniepr; Kirovograd Offensive; Uman–Botoșani Offensive; First Jassy-Kishinev Offensive; Battle of Târgu Frumos; Second Jassy-Kishinev Offensive; Siege of Budapest; Vienna Offensive; Prague Offensive; Operation Whirlwind
- Decorations: Guards; Order of the Red Banner; Order of Suvorov
- Battle honours: Krasnograd

Commanders
- Notable commanders: Maj. Gen. Ivan Konstantinovich Morozov; Col. Sergei Grigorevich Nikolaiev; Col. Mikhail Andreevich Orlov

The 81st Guards Rifle Division was an infantry division of the Russian Ground Forces, previously serving in the Red Army and the Soviet Army. It was formed after the Battle of Stalingrad from the 422nd Rifle Division in recognition of that division's actions during the battle, specifically the encirclement and the siege of the German forces in the city. The 81st Guards continued a record of distinguished service through the rest of the Great Patriotic War, and continued to serve postwar, as a rifle division and later a motor rifle division, until being reorganized as the 57th Separate Guards Motor Rifle Brigade in 2009 in the Russian Ground Forces. Most of its postwar service was in the Soviet (Russian) far east, where it was originally formed as the 422nd.

== Formation ==
The 81st Guards was one of nineteen Guards rifle divisions created during and in the immediate aftermath of the Battle of Stalingrad. It was formed from the 422nd Rifle Division, which had helped to surround and later defeat the German Sixth Army. When formed, its order of battle was as follows:

- 233rd Guards Rifle Regiment from 1326th Rifle Regiment
- 235th Guards Rifle Regiment from 1334th Rifle Regiment
- 238th Guards Rifle Regiment from 1392nd Rifle Regiment
- 173rd Guards Artillery Regiment from 1061st Artillery Regiment
- 92nd Guards Sapper Battalion
- 87th Guards Antitank Battalion
- 109th Guards Signal Battalion
- 79th Guards Reconnaissance Company
- 506th Antiaircraft Battery (from 20 April 1943)

The division spent March and April rebuilding in the new 7th Guards Army (former 64th Army) before being sent north to Voronezh Front, where it took up and fortified positions on the southern shoulder of the Kursk salient, east of Belgorod.

== Battle of Kursk ==
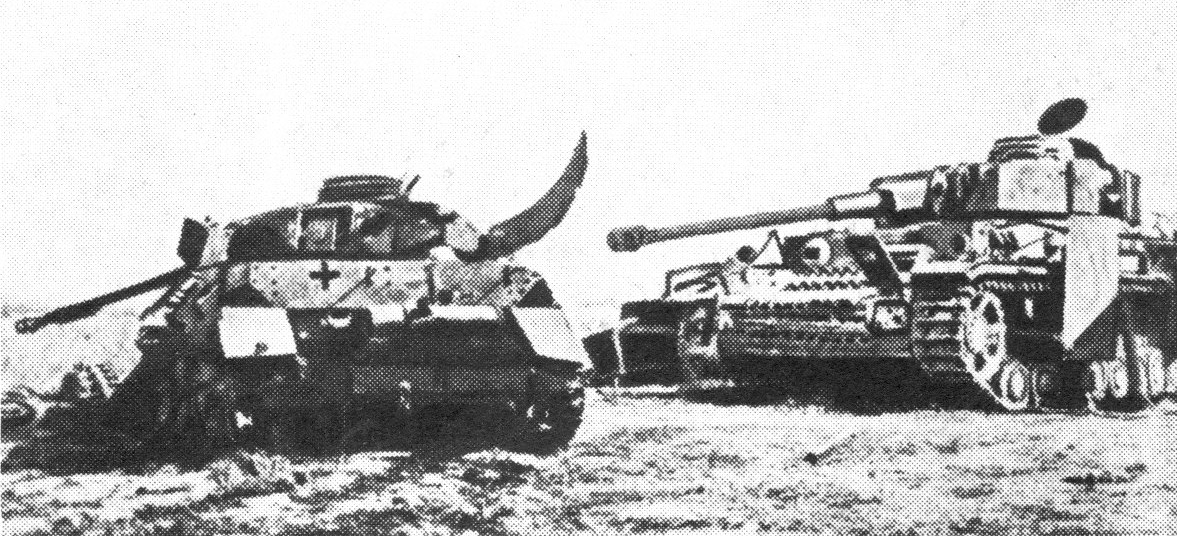
Destroyed German tanks at Kursk

During the Battle of Kursk, the 81st was faced with attacks from the German Army Detachment Kempf. The division's positions prevented a German advance from the Mikhailovka bridgehead. It initially repulsed the attacks of the 168th Infantry Division on July 5. The 19th Panzer Division broke through near Razumnoe and attacked at the junction of the 78th Guards Rifle Division with the 81st. On the next day the 19th Panzer Division continued to attack along with the 168th and attacked the division's left flank and rear. The 81st put up strong resistance, but Belovskoe and Kreida Station were captured. The division's training battalion was sent into battle around Iastrebovo to stop the German advance. On July 7, III Panzer Corps tried to outflank the division and the 19th Panzer Division captured Blizhniaia Igumenka after fierce fighting. In these first days the division was encircled in its forward positions, and in the course of breaking out lost all of its divisional artillery, most of its regimental artillery, and was reduced to 3,000 men reporting for duty, with about 20 percent unarmed.

Following this breakout, the division was subordinated to 69th Army on July 9, where it would remain until the end of the battle. It was now in the 35th Guards Rifle Corps, holding a line from Staryi Gorod to Postnikov, preparing for an attack by the III Panzer Corps. During the third assault of the day at 1400 hrs. a neighboring rifle regiment was crushed, and the 81st was outflanked, but the German forces were unable to achieve their objective of Shishino. At 2200 hrs. 69th Army ordered the division to withdraw to new lines, and it was transferred again, now to 48th Rifle Corps, where it would remain until the end of the battle. The new lines ran along the right bank of the Northern Donets River from Hill 147.0 to Shcholokovo. The panzer troops, much weakened during the previous five days of heavy combat, had to rest and resupply on July 10. When the attack resumed on July 11, 19th Panzer Division took the villages of Khokhlovo and Kiselevo, pinning the 81st against the river. It was apparent that the German objective was to encircle 48th Corps. On the following day, the division thwarted an attempt to force the river at Shcholokovo; its main opponent, 19th Panzer, was by now down to only 14 operational tanks. However, a more successful crossing by 6th Panzer at Rzhavets to the north made the position of the rifle corps even more vulnerable, and elements of 5th Tank Army were diverted to reinforce it. The 81st received the support of the 26th Guards Tank Brigade. Even with this, after a week of heavy fighting and losses, morale was becoming shaky, and Maj. Gen. Morozov issued an order the following day:

"12.07.43 the commander of the 2nd Battalion of the 235th Guards Red Banner Rifle Regiment Guards Captain Goshtenar received an order to defend along the west bank of the Northern Donets River at the Shcholokovo fish farm and to prevent an enemy crossing... [A]t the appearance of an insignificant enemy force, he disgracefully abandoned the battlefield, and retreated without an order... For abandoning his assigned sector without an order and for his disgraceful flight from the battlefield, [Goshtenar] will be turned over for a trial by a military tribunal." (This officer was later exonerated.)

Between July 12 - 17, 398 men of the 81st were detained by blocking detachments. On the night of July 13, the 89th Guards Rifle Division and a rifle battalion of 375th Rifle Division were subordinated to Morozov's command. Finally, before dawn on July 15, 48th Rifle Corps began to withdraw from the loose pocket in which it was held, and completed this move by 1040 hrs. The 81st was directed to assemble in the area of Dalnii Dolzhik, where it began a long process of rest and replenishment.

== Advance to the Dniepr ==
Following the battle, and after rebuilding, the 81st rejoined the 7th Guards Army, where it remained until November 1944, in either the 24th or 25th Guards Rifle Corps. During the Belgorod-Khar'kov Offensive Operation, on September 14, General Morozov suffered a serious wound and left command of the division. On September 19 it assisted in the liberation of Krasnograd, and was granted its name as an honorific:

"KRASNOGRAD" - ...81st Guards Rifle Division (Colonel Kiladze, Varlaam Nikolayevich)...

Another commander, Col. S.G. Nikolaiev, was appointed the same day, and he continued in command until Morozov returned on December 12. During this time the division participated in the drive to the Dniepr River. From September 25 to 27 the commander of the 235th Guards Rifle Regiment, Lt. Col. Grigorii Trofimovich Skiruta, led his troops in crossing two channels of the river near the village of Orlik, and was recognized for his personal courage and bravery with the award of the Gold Star of a Hero of the Soviet Union on October 26. In January 1944, the division also took part in the liberation of Kirovograd.

== First Jassy-Kishinev Offensive ==
During the Uman–Botoșani Offensive the 81st Guards advanced from the Kirovograd area southwestward, reaching Pervomaisk on March 22. On April 1 the division was in 24th Guards Rifle Corps, along with the 8th Guards Airborne and the 72nd Guards Rifle Divisions. On the night of April 24/25 the division was relieving the 27th Army's 3rd Guards Airborne Division in the front lines in northern Romania, to the west of Jassy. Before its units could get properly dug-in they came under attack from the 1st Guards Royal Romanian Division. During this sharp fight the Romanian division penetrated the defenses of the 81st Guards and drove its forces northwards to the southern outskirts of the town of Harmanesti, 16 kilometres (9.9 mi) west-northwest of Târgu Frumos. Here the division was able to halt the enemy advance, and prepare a counterattack with its second-echelon rifle regiment, supported by all of the divisional artillery. After a short but bloody encounter, the Romanians broke for the rear, prompting their divisional commander to call for assistance from the neighboring German Grossdeutschland Division. In response, on April 26 a small battlegroup of tanks was dispatched to help the Romanians escape. After several more hours of fighting the front stabilized, and by April 28 both sides went over to the defensive, but the Axis forces held most of their gains, forcing a delay to the next Soviet offensive.

That effort finally kicked off on May 2. The 81st Guards was attacking in the first echelon of its corps, with support from the 27th Guards Tank Brigade plus the leading brigades of 29th Tank Corps, and the division's official history describes its mission as follows:

"After an artillery and mortar preparation, in cooperation with the tanks of 5th Guards Tank Army, penetrate the enemy's defenses along the Cuza Voda Station and Mount Hushenei front... The immediate mission is to capture Cuza Voda, Radiu, and Mount Hushenei. Subsequently, capture Harmanasu and Helestieni and seize a foothold on Mount Krivesti by day's end."

The attack began at 0400 hrs., and in the early going the 7th Guards Army advanced from 4–10 km (2.5–6.2 mi), in the direction of Târgu Frumos. According to the official history: "[T]he resistance offered by the Romanian infantry was weak. As soon as the Soviet tanks appeared in front of their trenches, with infantry advancing steadily behind them, few of them remained..." But this resistance increased as the Romanians retreated southwards.

"Retreating southward, the enemy clung to every house and hillock, trying with all of his might to halt us as far as possible forward from the fortified region... between the Seret and Prut Rivers. The Royal forces offered particularly strong resistance in the sector from the village of Helestieni to Mount Hushenei..."

By midday the division had bypassed and isolated several of Grossdeutschland's strong points and advanced up to 12km southwards, capturing several other fortified villages and approaching the outskirts of Târgu Frumos by late afternoon, before being intercepted by a battlegroup from the 3rd SS Panzer Division. In addition, Grossdeutschland committed a battery of 88s and its tank reserves against the Soviet armor. This served to force the 81st, and its support, back up the valley as far as Radiu. Overnight the Front commander, Marshal I.S. Konev, ordered a regrouping of the attack forces. The 81st and the 72nd Guards were to concentrate on a narrow 4 km (2.5 mi) sector between Mount Hushenei and Radiu. They were to penetrate the German defenses northwest of Târgu Frumos and support the commitment of 5th Tank Army forces into the penetration. But this assault met "with completely no success", and the division suffered considerable losses. In the words of its official history:

"After an agonizing six days of attempts to penetrate the Târgu Frumos fortified region, the armies of General Shumilov [7th Guards] and Marshal Rotmistrov [5th Guards Tank] did not succeed. Here they then went over to the defense."

This defensive posture continued until late August, when the Second Jassy-Kishinev Offensive began. Within days the Axis forces in eastern Romania were crushed, and the 81st Guards drove into Hungary.

== Into the Balkans ==
In preparation for the final drive on Budapest, in November, the 81st, under 24th Guards Rifle Corps, was transferred to 53rd Army for the duration. In the same month, on November 11, Maj. Gen. Morozov was removed from command, replaced by Col. M.A. Orlov, who remained in command for the duration. The division ended the war in this corps and army near Prague. It was now known by the official title of 81st Guards Rifle, Krasnograd, Order of the Red Banner, Order of Suvorov Division (Russian: 81-я гвардейская стрелковая Красноградская Краснознамённая ордена Суворова дивизия), and four men of the division had received the Gold Star of Heroes of the Soviet Union.

== Postwar ==
The division became part of the 27th Guards Rifle Corps in the Kiev Military District and became the 9th Guards Rifle Brigade at Glukhov and Romny. In October 1953, it became a division again. The division was soon relocated to Arad and became part of the Special Mechanized Army. Its 233rd Guards Rifle Regiment was attached to the 33rd Guards Mechanized Division, fighting in the Soviet invasion of Hungary.

On June 4, 1957, the division was reorganized as the 81st Guards Motor Rifle Division. The division was relocated to Bucharest and then to Konotop. It briefly became part of the 27th Guards Army Corps but in August, 1958 became part of the 1st Army (the former Special Mechanized Army) after the corps was disbanded. In July 1969, the division was sent to Bikin, the city where the 422nd Rifle Division had formed in late 1941, as part of the 45th Army Corps. In 1970 its order of battle was as follows:

- 233rd Guards Motor Rifle Regiment (Bikin)
- 235th Guards Motor Rifle Regiment (Vyazemsky)
- 238th Guards Motor Rifle Regiment (Lermontovka)
- 296th Tank Regiment (Bikin)
- 91st Guards Artillery Regiment (Rozengartovka)
- 1169th Anti-Aircraft Artillery Regiment (Rozengartovka)
- 118th Reconnaissance Battalion (Bikin)
- 236th Guards Engineer-Sapper Battalion (Bikin)
- 547th Guards Communications Battalion (Bikin)

In November 1972, the corps was disbanded and the division became part of the 15th Army.

In October, 1993 the army became the 43rd Army Corps and in May, 1998 was disbanded. The division became part of the Far Eastern Military District (now Eastern Military District). On June 1, 2009, it became the 57th Separate Guards Motor Rifle Brigade, 5th Combined Arms Army.
