= Ivan Morozov (major general) =

Soviet military commander (1904–1979)

Ivan Konstantinovich Morozov
- Born: 6 January 1905; Kagalnitskaya stanitsa, Don Host Oblast, Russian Empire
- Died: 11 July 1979 (aged 74); Volgograd, Soviet Union
- Military career
- Allegiance: Soviet Union (1918–1955)
- Service years: 1918–1955
- Rank: Major General
- Commands: 422nd Rifle Division (redesignated 81st Guards Rifle Division); 51st Guards Rifle Division
- Conflicts: Russian Civil War; Polish–Soviet War; Soviet–Japanese Border Wars; Battle of Lake Khasan; World War II; Eastern Front
- Awards: Order of Lenin; Order of the Red Banner (5); Order of Kutuzov 2nd class Order of Bogdan Khmelnitsky 2nd class

Ivan Konstantinovich Morozov (Russian: Иван Константинович Морозов; December 24 [O.S. January 6, 1905] 1904 – July 11, 1979) was a major general of the Red Army during the Second World War.

Morozov joined the Red Army during the Russian Civil War as a teenager, and following the end of the war served in the Caucasus region, rising to command positions in the cavalry. During the mid-1930s he was moved to the far east of Russia, to take several peacetime commands and deputy commands, and served as a battalion chief of staff at the Battle of Lake Khasan. He reached the rank of colonel before taking over what would eventually be the 422nd Rifle Division, the highest-numbered such division to actually see combat in the Soviet-German War. In recognition of the 422nd's achievements in Operation Ring, it was re-designated as the 81st Guards Rifle Division on March 1, 1943, and Morozov was promoted to the rank of major general the same day. He continued to lead the 81st Guards until September 14, returning to command on December 12. He remained there until November 11, 1944, when he was replaced. Morozov was retired from the Soviet Army on February 15, 1955, due to illness. During his retirement he lived in Voronezh and Stalingrad (Volgograd) and wrote several volumes of memoirs before he died on July 11, 1979.

== Early life and Russian Civil War ==
Morozov was born on January 6, 1905, at the Kagalnitskaya stanitsa in the Don Host Oblast, and graduated from a parochial school in 1914. In June 1918 he joined the Red Army in Rakov (now Novobataisk) during the Russian Civil War. Serving as a Red Army man and a scout in the Sreda detachment of the 1st Peasant Regiment, Morozov fought against the Volunteer Army and the White Cossacks at Kushevka in the Don Host Oblast, and in the Kuban on the Manych. The detachment was defeated in March 1919 and Morozov with a group of fighters escaped towards Bataysk. Having linked up with Red Army units south of Rostov, he became a scout in the 3rd Squadron of the 20th Salsk Cavalry Regiment in the 4th Cavalry Division, which subsequently became part of the 1st Cavalry Army. With the army, Morozov fought in battles at Tsaritsyn, the Voronezh–Kastornoye operation, the Kharkiv operation, the Donbass operation (1919), the Rostov–Novocherkassk operation, the North Caucasus operation, and the Battle of Yegorlykskaya. He was thrice wounded, in 1919 at Malyy Bal and Sinyavinskaya, and in 1920 at Yekaterinoslav.

With the division, from May 1920 he fought in the Polish–Soviet War, participating in engagements at Zhytomyr, Novohrad-Volynskyi, Lviv, and Zamość. Following the Soviet defeat in the war the division transferred to Crimea to fight in the Perekop-Chongar Offensive against White forces in November, then fought against the anarchist Revolutionary Insurrectionary Army of Ukraine. For his actions, Morozov was awarded a ceremonial shashka by the Revolutionary Military Council in 1922.

== Interwar period ==
From June 1923 he served in the 25th Novocherkassk Rifle Regiment of the 9th Don Rifle Division in the North Caucasus Military District. Between April 1923 and April 1924 Morozov studied at the 11th courses for Red Army commanders in Novocherkassk. Upon his return to the regiment, he served as a section commander, company starshina, and commander of a mounted reconnaissance platoon. On November 20, 1927, he became a cadet in the North Caucasus Mountain Peoples Cavalry School in Krasnodar, rising to successively become assistant platoon commander, starshina of the 2nd squadron, and acting cadet commander at the school. In 1930 he participated in the suppression of a revolt in the Karachay Autonomous Oblast, before graduating in May of that year. Assigned to the 77th Buzuluk Cavalry Regiment of the 10th Cavalry Division in Mozdok, Morozov became a platoon commander in the machine gun squadron and regimental school, political officer of the 5th Squadron, and commander and political officer of a squadron.

Morozov was placed at the disposal of the head of the Yeysk Naval Flying School on August 11, 1934, before transferring to the Far East to become assistant chief of staff and commandant of the 30th Naval Cruiser Aviation Squadron, part of the Pacific Fleet at Sukhodol Bay. He was seconded to the sixth department of the Special Red Banner Far Eastern Army in late May 1935, then made commander and commissar of a separate cavalry squadron in the 1st Pacific Rifle Division, stationed in the Far Eastern Krai. Morozov became chief of staff of a separate reconnaissance battalion of the 39th Rifle Division (the former 1st Pacific Rifle Division) in April 1936, which later became part of the 1st Red Banner Army. Between August 5 and 30, 1938, Morozov fought with the battalion in the Battle of Lake Khasan. He was appointed chief of staff of the 116th Rifle Regiment of the division in October but did not serve in the position due to his being on leave. Morozov became chief of staff of the 84th Cavalry Regiment of the 31st Cavalry Division, part of the 1st Red Banner Army at Lazo in December 1938, then took command of the 79th Cavalry Regiment of the division in August 1939; the regiment was soon renumbered as the 12th Altai Cavalry. In March, 1941, he was given command of the 29th Motorcycle Regiment of Far Eastern Front's 30th Mechanized Corps.

== World War II ==
In January, 1942, Morozov became deputy commander of the 66th Rifle Division in 35th Army of the Far Eastern Front, but on March 4 he took command of the new 422nd Rifle Division, in the same Army. At the time, the commander of 35th Army, Major General Vladimir Aleksandrovich Zaitsev, described Morozov as follows:

Overall and political development are both satisfactory. He works above his level of command. He is a capable, energetic and decisive commander. He is insufficiently prepared tactically for the post he occupies. He works insufficiently in this direction... Shortcoming: He sometimes allows himself to become quick-tempered and short with subordinates.

In July, the 422nd was transferred to the Stalingrad area by rail, where it joined the Stalingrad Front. As part of the 4th Tank Army, it fought in the defeat of German troops around Buzinovskaya between August 3–4. On August 4, the division transferred to the 57th Army and fought in fierce defensive battles, covering the southern approaches to the city. At the end of August, the division defended the line of Tundutovo and Chapurniki, before transferring to the 64th Army less the 1334th Rifle Regiment, on the night of September 18–19. It concentrated on the northern outskirts of Beketovka, then fought in heavy fighting in the Kuporosnoe area. The 422nd advanced from the Gornaya Polyana area towards Yelshanka and the northwestern outskirts of the city centre during the second half of October with an army shock group tasked with capturing Kuporosnoe, Yelshanka and the southern part of Stalingrad to the Darnitsa River, then clearing the city centre of German troops to link up with the 62nd Army. It returned to the 57th Army on November 6, and was relocated to the area to the west of Krasnoarmeysk on November 7–8.

Morozov led his division through Operation Uranus, the Soviet counteroffensive at Stalingrad, beginning in the second half of November. By the end of November 22, advancing in conjunction with the 169th Rifle Division, the division had broken Axis resistance and reached the line of Nariman and Gavrilovka. It then advanced to the line of Tsybenko and Rakotino to relieve the encircled 13th Tank Corps. The 422nd repulsed fierce Axis counterattacks from 25 November while holding Kravtsov. At the beginning of December it was withdrawn into the army reserve, covering the front from Chervlenaya River to Tsybenko and Novy Rogachik. It went back into combat with the 64th Army between 4 and 15 December, then withdrew into front reserve before returning to the 57th Army on 16 December.

As part of the Stalingrad Front and then the Don Front from 1 January 1943, the division fought in Operation Ring, the destruction of German troops trapped in the pocket created by Operation Uranus. On January 29, he personally took the surrender of Lieutenant General Edler von Daniels and his 376th Infantry Division in the ruins of the city. Following the end of the battle, the division transferred to the 64th Army, which became part of the operational group of Lieutenant General Kuzma Trubnikov; the latter became the Stalingrad Group of Forces on 27 February. For its actions, the 422nd became the 81st Guards Rifle Division on 1 March 1943; Morozov was promoted to major general on the next day. Shortly afterwards, the 81st Guards were transferred with the 64th Army (redesignated 7th Guards Army on 1 May) to the Voronezh Front, where they defended the Seversky Donets in the Belgorod area. The division became part of the 25th Guards Rifle Corps on 4 May. The division staged an especially strong defense during the Battle of Kursk in and near the Stari Gorod (Old Town) suburb of Belgorod from 5–9 July before being forced to break out of partial encirclement on 10 July due to the retreat of the forces on its flanks. On 27 August Morozov was recognized for his leadership with the award of the Order of Kutuzov, 2nd Class.

The division transferred to the 48th Rifle Corps of the 69th Army on July 12, then back to the 7th Guards Army, now with the Steppe Front (renamed the 2nd Ukrainian on October 20), on July 29. Morozov subsequently led the 81st Guards in the Battle of Kursk, during which it fought in the Battle of Prokhorovka, the Belgorod-Kharkov Offensive Operation, and the Battle of the Dnieper. On September 14 he left his command, and was replaced by Col. Sergeii Grigorevich Nikolaiev five days later. Morozov returned to the 81st on December 12. He went on to lead the division in the recapture of Left-bank Ukraine, the Kirovograd Offensive, the Uman–Botoșani Offensive, the Second Jassy–Kishinev Offensive, and the advance into Romania and Bulgaria. He last led the division during the Battle of Debrecen in October 1944.

In November 1944, Morozov was sent to study in the Higher Academic Courses at the Military Academy of the General Staff, and upon his graduation in April 1945, became a student at the main faculty of the academy.

== Postwar ==
While still studying at the academy in October, Morozov was appointed commander of the 21st Guards Rifle Division, part of the 6th Guards Army in the Baltic Military District. He transferred to command the 51st Guards Rifle Division of the 23rd Guards Rifle Corps in May 1946. After a period at the disposal of the Main Personnel Directorate from April 1950, he became head of the military department of the Stalingrad Agricultural Institute in December of that year, his last position before retirement in February 1955. He died in Volgograd on 11 July 1979.

== Awards and decorations ==
Morozov received the following awards:

Order of Lenin (21 February 1945)
Order of the Red Banner, five times (8 February 1943, 22 February 1943, 25 April 1943, 3 November 1944, 19 November 1951)
Order of Kutuzov, 2nd class (27 August 1943)
Order of Bogdan Khmelnitsky, 2nd class (13 November 1944)
Medal "For the Defence of Stalingrad" (1942)
Medal "For the Victory over Germany in the Great Patriotic War 1941–1945" (1945)
Jubilee Medal "Twenty Years of Victory in the Great Patriotic War 1941-1945" (1965)
Jubilee Medal "Thirty Years of Victory in the Great Patriotic War 1941–1945" (1975)
Jubilee Medal "In Commemoration of the 100th Anniversary of the Birth of Vladimir Ilyich Lenin" (1969)
Jubilee Medal "30 Years of the Soviet Army and Navy" (1948)
Jubilee Medal "50 Years of the Armed Forces of the USSR" (1968)
Jubilee Medal "60 Years of the Armed Forces of the USSR" (1978)
