= Grigory Skiruta =

Soviet lieutenant colonel (1912–1999)

Grigory Trofimovich Skiruta
- Born: 21 November [O.S. 4 December] 1912; Velikopolovetskoe, Kiev Oblast, Russian Empire
- Died: 28 July 1999 (aged 86); Solnechnogorsk, Moscow Oblast, Russia
- Burial place: New Cemetery, Solnechnogorsk
- Military career
- Allegiance: Soviet Union
- Service years: 1932–1961
- Rank: Colonel
- Commands: 1334th Rifle Regiment, 422nd Rifle Division; 235th Guards Rifle Regiment, 81st Guards Rifle Division
- Conflicts: World War II
- Awards: Hero of the Soviet Union; Order of Lenin; Order of the Red Banner (2); Order of the Patriotic War (1st Degree); Order of the Red Star (2)

Grigory Trofimovich Skiruta (Russian: Григорий Трофимович Скирута; November 21 [O.S. December 4] 1912 – 9 September 1999, Solnechnogorsk) was a lieutenant colonel of the Red Army during the Second World War. He became a Hero of the Soviet Union during the fighting along the Dniepr River in 1943. He continued to serve well into the postwar era, and was promoted to colonel in 1961, when he went into the reserve.

== Biography ==
Skiruta was born on December 4, 1912, in the village of Velikopolovetskoe in the Kiev Oblast. He was Ukrainian by nationality. After he completed primary school he went to work as a timekeeper in one of the State farms of Chernigov Oblast. He joined the Red Army in 1932, and in 1936 he completed the courses for junior commanders. In 1940 he joined the Communist Party.

As the 422nd Rifle Division formed up in the Russian Far East in the spring of 1942, Skiruta was assigned to it, serving first as deputy commander and eventually as commander of its 1334th Rifle Regiment, with the rank of lieutenant colonel. The division arrived at the front near Stalingrad on July 26, where Skiruta first saw combat. By September the bulk of the 422nd was in the 64th Army, on the Volga south of the German encirclement, but the 1334th was detached to a special task force in 57th Army further south. On the night of September 28–29 this force of two rifle regiments with tank and artillery support attacked positions held by the 1st Romanian Infantry Division south of Lake Sarpa, driving them back as much as 5 km and liberating the villages of Tsatsa and Simkin by October 1. This was an ominous foretaste of the weakness of the Romanian forces north and south of Stalingrad.

When Operation Uranus began in the southern sector on November 20, Skiruta's regiment was back in the 422nd in 64th Army, once again attacking forces of the newly-formed 4th Romanian Army and driving them back until encountering the German 29th Motorized Division, which brought the advance to a halt. The division served in Operation Ring in January, 1943, and on March 1 was re-designated as the 81st Guards Rifle Division. The 1334th was concurrently re-designated as the 235th Guards Rifle Regiment.

Skiruta led his regiment during the Battle of Kursk. The 81st Guards built especially strong defenses on the east bank of the Donets River, based on the Stari Gorod (Old Town) of Belgorod; in the defensive plan of Voronezh Front this was intended as a bastion to hold the junction of 6th and 7th Guards Armies and to prevent 4th Panzer Army and Army Detachment Kempf from linking up. By July 9 the bastion was deeply outflanked and nearly encircled, and the division commander, Maj, Gen. I. K. Morozov, ordered a retreat. In recognition of his meritorious behavior, inflicting heavy casualties on the enemy between July 5–16, and leading his troops through a cordon of panzers on the night of July 9–10, Morozov commended Skiruta to be awarded the Order of the Red Banner on July 20, which was approved by the military council of 7th Guards Army on August 21. A few days later, Morozov cited the commander of Skiruta's 2nd battalion, Captain Goshtenar, for retreating without orders, but this judgement was later quashed.

Following Kursk, Skiruta continued to lead his regiment, participating in the liberations of Kharkov, Merefa and Krasnograd, for the last of which the 81st Guards received a divisional honorific. By late September 7 Guards Army was approaching the Dniepr River, behind which Army Group South was scrambling to build a new defensive line. The 81st Guards were nearing the village of Orlik, south of Poltava, on September 23, where more than 5,000 enemy officers and men and over 1,000 trucks and wagons had converged on the crossing point. They were supported by long-range artillery fire and aircraft from the west bank. Fierce fighting continued over the next two days; the 233rd Guards Regiment, in the division's first echelon, did not have the strength to force the Germans into the river.

To overcome the position, overnight on September 25–26 the 233rd and 235th Guards Regiments forced a crossing of the main channel of the Dniepr, occupying West Island. The following night the second channel was also crossed and a bridgehead was established on the west bank after heavy fighting for the large village of Borodaevka, which was about 6 km in length. On October 26, Guards Lieutenant Colonel G. T. Skiruta was recognized by the Presidium of the Supreme Soviet of the USSR for his command of his regiment, personal courage and bravery in the crossing battle with the award of the Order of Lenin and the Gold Star of a Hero of the Soviet Union (No. 1430).

Skiruta continued in command of his regiment through the battles for west bank Ukraine, participating in the liberation of Kirovograd during the Battle of the Korsun Pocket and the crossings of the Southern Bug, Dniestr and Prut Rivers during 1944. After the occupation of Romania in October, Skiruta was sent to study at the Frunze Academy. After his graduation in 1947 he went back to command of a regiment, then taught tactics to senior officers at the Vystrel courses. He was promoted to the rank of colonel in 1961 just prior to being moved to the reserve.

In his retirement Skiruta moved to the town of Solnechnogorsk northwest of Moscow, here he spent some of his time directing military-patriotic work among the young people of the area. In 1995 he was named an honorary citizen of Solnechnogorsk. He died on July 28, 1999, and was buried in the town's New Cemetery.
