= 169th Rifle Division =

- Active: 1939–1946
- Country: Soviet Union
- Branch: Red Army
- Type: Infantry
- Size: Division
- Engagements: Soviet occupation of Western Ukraine; Soviet occupation of Bessarabia and Northern Bukovina; Operation Barbarossa; Battle of Uman; Battle of Kiev (1941); Second Battle of Kharkov; Operation Wilhelm; Case Blue; Battle of Stalingrad; Operation Uranus; Operation Ring; Operation Kutuzov; Battle of the Dniepr; Rogachev–Zhlobin offensive Operation Bagration; Bobruysk offensive Minsk offensive Vistula-Oder Offensive; East Prussian Offensive; Heiligenbeil Pocket; Battle of Berlin
- Decorations: Order of the Red Banner; Order of Suvorov; Order of Kutuzov
- Battle honours: Rogachev

Commanders
- Notable commanders: Maj. Gen. Ivan Evdokimovich Turunov; Maj. Gen. Samuil Mironovich Rogachevskii; Maj. Gen. Yakov Filatovich Yeryomenko; Maj. Gen. Fyodor Andreevich Veryovkin

The 169th Rifle Division began forming as an infantry division of the Red Army in the Ukraine Military District in August 1939, based on the shtat (table of organization and equipment) of the following month. It nominally saw service in the occupation force in western Ukraine in September, but was not in any state to see combat. It played a more active role in the Soviet occupation of Bessarabia and Northern Bukovina in June/July 1940. The German invasion in June 1941 found it still in Ukraine, as part of 55th Rifle Corps fighting back to the Dniepr until it was nearly destroyed. It joined the reformed 28th Army after that Army was assigned to Southwestern Front. In May it formed part of the Front's northern shock group for the offensive intended to liberate Kharkiv. While initially hampered by the failure to take the German strongpoint at Ternovaya it gradually developed momentum in cooperation with 175th Rifle Division and ended up deep into the German positions before being struck by an armored counterattack on May 20 and being driven back to near its starting line, at considerable cost. In June it was nearly encircled during Operation Wilhelm, but managed to escape, again with serious losses. At the end of July it was removed to the Stalingrad Military District for rebuilding, joining the reformed 28th Army in the Kalmyk Steppe, but was then moved north in October to 64th Army south of Stalingrad and played a minor role in an offensive to break into the city. At the start of Operation Uranus it was in 57th Army south of the city and quickly penetrated the Romanian positions and exploited westward until coming up against German positions on the southern edge of what was now the Stalingrad Kessel (Pocket). During the operation that eliminated the pocket in January 1943 it was again under 64th Army, now in Don Front. Following the German surrender the 169th was removed to the Reserve of the Supreme High Command and sent north to join 11th Guards Army in Western Front, and under these command it took part in the offensive against the Oryol salient in July and August. With the successful conclusion of this operation the division was moved to 63rd Army, which became part of Belorussian Front (later 1st Belorussian) in October, following an advance through northeastern Ukraine. It saw action in eastern Belarus through the fall and winter, being moved to 3rd Army after the 63rd was disbanded, and it would remain in this Army for nearly the entire remainder of the war. In late February 1944 the 169th was awarded a battle honor for its part in the liberation of Rahachow. After a pause in operations in the spring the division fought in Operation Bagration, including taking part in the clearing of the city of Babruysk, and during the pursuit of the defeated forces of Army Group Center won the Order of the Red Banner after taking Vawkavysk, now as part of 2nd Belorussian Front. Before the offensive culminated it advanced past Białystok nearly to the borders of East Prussia. During the Vistula-Oder Offensive in January 1945 the 169th crossed that border and fought in there into March, briefly as part of 3rd Belorussian Front, winning the Order of Suvorov and Order of Kutuzov in the process. It was moved, with 3rd Army, back to 1st Belorussian Front in time for the final assault on Berlin, and fought in the encirclement battle with German 9th Army southeast of the city in the last days of April. It ended the war along the Elbe River and, although it was slated for disbandment during the summer, it continued in service in Belarus until June 1946.

== Formation ==
The 169th was based on a cadre from the 45th Rifle Regiment of the 15th Rifle Division as it was converting to a motorized division, and began forming on August 25 and into September 1939 at Kherson and Mykolaiv in the Ukrainian Military District (later, the Odessa Military District). While still forming up it was officially in the third echelon of the Soviet forces as part of 6th Rifle Corps taking part in the Soviet invasion of Poland. It also participated in the Soviet occupation of Bessarabia and Northern Bukovina in June/July 1940, under command of 37th Rifle Corps. In early 1941 it was assigned to 55th Rifle Corps in the Kiev Special Military District, along with the 130th and 189th Rifle Divisions.

== Operation Barbarossa ==
Kombrig Ivan Evdokimovich Turunov had been appointed to command of the division on January 10, 1940. He had previously led the 99th Rifle Division through all of 1939. His rank was modernized to that of major general on June 5, 1940. On June 22, 1941, the order of battle of the 169th was as follows:

- 434th Rifle Regiment
- 556th Rifle Regiment
- 680th Rifle Regiment
- 307th Artillery Regiment
- 342nd Howitzer Regiment (until November 19, 1941)
- 160th Antitank Battalion
- 152nd Reconnaissance Company (later 152nd Reconnaissance Battalion)
- 171st Sapper Battalion
- 159th Signal Battalion
- 258th Medical/Sanitation Battalion
- 83rd Chemical Defense (Anti-gas) Platoon
- 100th Motor Transport Company (later 100th Motor Transport Battalion)
- 350th Field Bakery (later 94th Motor Field Bakery)
- 171st Divisional Veterinary Hospital
- 75th Divisional Artillery Workshop
- 459th Field Postal Station
- 355th Field Office of the State Bank

As the German offensive began the division was headquartered northwest of Zhmerynka, but its subunits were spread over 65km in peacetime garrisons around Lipkany, Mohyliv-Podilskyi, and Grushka along the Dniestr River. On June 25 it was assigned to Southern Front, and within days the 55th Corps, minus the 189th Division, came under command of 18th Army.

=== Battle of Uman ===
By July 13 the 169th was holding a front along the Dniestr northwest of Mohyliv-Podilskyi. The 680th Rifle Regiment came under attack from a Romanian force in the area of Nova Ushytsia. The regiment's battery of four 45mm antitank guns was led by Sen. Lt. Labius, and one of his gun layers was Krasnoarmeets Yakov Kharitonovich Kolchak. Allowing a column of Romanian tanks to come as close as 150m before opening fire, in an hour of fighting he destroyed four of them, including two when he had only one other member of his crew remaining. His gun was then crushed by a tank that managed to break into his position. On August 2, on the recommendation of 18th Army's commander, Lt. Gen. A. K. Smirnov, Kolchak was made a Hero of the Soviet Union, while Labius received the Order of Lenin. However, Kolchak had been wounded and left on the battlefield on July 23 and fell into enemy hands before he had been informed of his award. Eventually listed as missing in action he was liberated in Moldova in August 1944 and mobilized again into the Red Army on September 9, being sent to serve in the 168th Penal Company in 57th Army for the duration of the war. He continued to serve with distinction, winning the Order of the Red Banner and Order of the Red Star and rising to the rank of starshina, but he was only informed that he had been awarded the Gold Star when he returned to the USSR. He was presented with this, and its accompanying Order of Lenin, at the Kremlin on March 25, 1947. He went to work in agriculture and as a political representative following this, but died on March 7, 1955 at the age of 36 and was buried near Mykolaiv.

The 169th remained under attack from the Romanian 3rd Army and was soon forced to fall back to the southeast; it was located roughly halfway between its former location and the city of Kodyma by July 23 and then beyond that place by the end of the month. This retreat placed it south of the Axis forces that were proceeding to envelop the 6th and 12th Armies to the north in the Uman area. This was completed on August 1, and over the following days the 169th attempted to aid the breakout of the encircled Soviet forces. While directing his troops from his command post in the Pervomaisk area General Turunov was severely wounded by a shell fragment. He was evacuated by air to Kharkiv, but died in hospital on August 3. He was replaced the next day by Lt. Col. Nikolai Nikolaevich Zelinskii.

==== Retreat through south Ukraine ====
Retreating under pressure through the southern Ukraine, by August 12 the division was reduced to two groups, one with a strength of 808 men, and one of just 603 men. The former group was destroyed on August 14, and two days later the latter group was evacuated over the Dniepr River to serve as a cadre for the rebuilding division. By September 1 it was back in the line under command of the reconstructed 6th Army near Dnipro. The order of battle had changed; the 135th Antiaircraft Battalion had been removed to become a separate unit. Lt. Colonel Zelinskii was replaced on October 1 by Col. Samuil Mironovich Rogachevskii. On October 30 the 169th was in 38th Army of Southwestern Front with 4,787 officers and men in the ranks. During October and November it took part in 38th Army's delaying action west and later east of Kharkiv. The city fell to German 6th Army on October 25 after five days of heavy fighting.

On December 26 the 342nd Howitzer Regiment was disbanded and the 307th Light Artillery Regiment became a standard divisional artillery regiment, while the reconnaissance battalion was reorganized as a company, with the same number. As of January 1, 1942, the divisional strength was 5,536 officers and men, half of what was authorized for a rifle division at that time, but about average compared to other such divisions. By this time it had been transferred to 21st Army, still in Southwestern Front. On January 20 Colonel Rogachevskii left the division for the 8th Motor Rifle Division NKVD, which he had been concurrently leading since January 11, and was replaced by Maj. Gen. Mikhail Ivanovich Goryunov until February 27, when Rogachevskii returned while still leading 8th NKVD into April. He was promoted to the rank of major general on May 30. In March the 169th returned to 38th Army, before being moved to the rebuilt 28th Army the next month.

== Second Battle of Kharkiv ==
28th Army, under command of Lt. Gen. D. I. Ryabyshev, also contained the 13th Guards, 38th, 162nd, 175th, and 244th Rifle Divisions, plus a cavalry corps and four tank brigades.

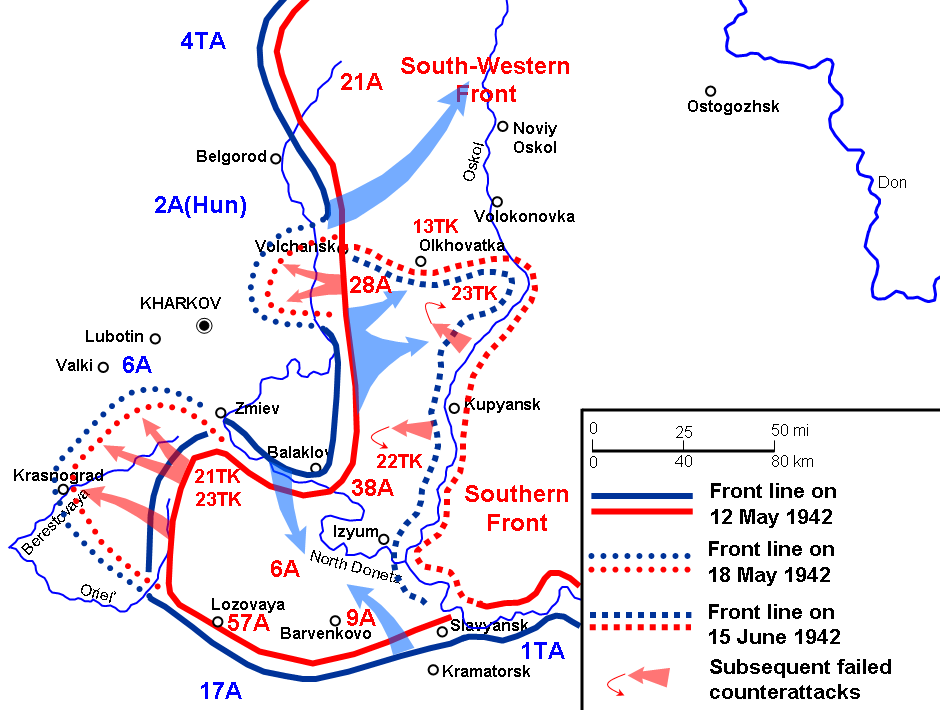
Second Battle of Kharkiv. Note position of 28th Army.

Marshal S. K. Timoshenko, who now commanded Southwestern Front, planned a new offensive to liberate Kharkiv with two shock groups. 28th Army formed the center of the northern group, with 21st Army to its north and 38th Army to its south. Ryabyshev's Army, located northeast of the city and with the bulk of the armor support, was expected to lead the advance. The 169th's initial objective was the village of Ternovaya in cooperation with the 175th; this was held by elements of the 429th Regiment of the 294th Infantry Division. Rogachevskii's reconnaissance thoroughly surveyed the defenses and passed on 43 specific targets to the supporting artillery. These included three artillery and two mortar batteries plus a pair of antitank guns; altogether the 169th outgunned the defenders 54 to 26.

The offensive opened at 0630 hours on May 12 with a 60-minute artillery preparation led by Lt. Col. S. M. Bichek's 307th Artillery and backed by almost 100 reserve guns and mortars, followed by a 15-20 minute air attack against front line strongpoints and artillery positions. The infantry and tanks went over to the attack at 0730. Elements of the 556th Rifle Regiment quickly overcame the flattened advance positions and occupied the dominant height 203.4. However, the regimental commander was careless and failed to order his troops to dig in or to bring forward his regimental guns, giving the 429th Regiment the opportunity to counterattack and drive the 556th back to its start line. This uncovered the right flank of the 680th Rifle Regiment and put the entire Army offensive in jeopardy. Rogachevskii and Ryabyshev both reacted with alacrity to rally the 556th in person. After the latter arranged for renewed artillery and air strikes on the high point he led a combined infantry and tank attack which returned the regiment to the objective, whereupon it resumed its advance. Another strong German counterattack was defeated largely by regimental gun direct fire and the regiment now dug in to prepare to resume the attack in the morning. The 680th launched a coordinated attack by all three battalions against the fortified village of Bairak. The 3rd Battalion forced its way in during heavy house-to-house fighting, followed by the 1st and 2nd. With its retreat routes threatened the garrison withdrew to new positions along a north-south road just west of the village, and the tired 680th followed up before also digging in for the night. In the event, 28th Army had gained only 2–4km in heavy fighting through the day and German forces continued to hold Varvarovka and Ternovaya, hindering the development of the offensive, even though the former had been encircled.

Overnight, the commander of Army Group South released the 23rd Panzer Division plus two infantry divisions to its 6th Army to join the depleted 3rd Panzer Division as a counterattack force. When combat resumed on the morning of May 13 Ryabyshev decided to develop the offensive on his left flank, taking advantage of the gains made by 38th Army the day before. During the day the garrison of Varvarovka was liquidated but Ternovaya continued to hold out, despite itself being encircled. The 680th and 556th Regiments advanced into the woods south of the strongpoint, cut the road leading north into it, and seized height 226. But the 556th and the left flank regiment of the 175th were unable to force their way into the village proper. Late in the day the 38th Division was ordered forward to maintain the encirclement while the 175th and 169th continued to advance to the west. By the middle of the day disconcerting intelligence reports were reaching Ryabyshev about large concentrations of German armor and infantry massing east of the city. Early in the afternoon the German grouping struck 38th Army, and 13th Guards was ordered to form a defense facing south.

Despite the growing crisis on his left flank, Ryabyshev urged his divisions onward on May 14. While Ternovaya continued to hold out to the 38th, the 175th and 169th advanced 6-8km, defeating several small units formed from rear-area support troops. The 680th Regiment, assisted by tanks of the 84th Tank Brigade, fought a stiff battle to drive German troops from Veseloe; by the end of the day it had been reinforced by the 556th and after completing its capture prepared for a morning advance on Lyptsi. The two divisions were now reaching the German rear defense line running along the west bank of the Kharkiv River, but they had taken significant losses. At the same time Ternovaya remained in German hands for several more days, requiring air supply and even reinforcements in the form of paratroops. Meanwhile, the armored attacks against 28th Army's left flank, in which the 13th Guards still held most of their positions, but at the cost of as much as a third of their strength, rendered that wing of the Army incapable of further offensive action.

After some hesitation overnight in the German command, its counterattack proceeded on May 15. A grouping consisting of an infantry regiment and 40 tanks struck from the Nepokrytaia region against the boundary of the 28th and 38th Armies and advanced northeastward toward Peremoga and Ternovaya. One regiment of the 244th Division was driven back 10km in what can only be termed a rout, finally taking up new positions 2–3km southwest of Ternovaya. Meanwhile, the 175th and 169th had received orders from Timoshenko to continue their advance alongside 21st Army. In the event, the two divisions scrambled throughout the day to contain the German breakthrough. Early in the morning the 680th and 556th swept across the valley of the Murom River and by noon reached the outskirts of Lyptsi, with the 434th Regiment (Col. I. P. Mishin) closely following. The 1st Battalion of the 556th (Sen. Lt. I. G. Shchegrenev) pushed into the town and drove the defenders to the western edge of town along the Kharkiv. A following counterattack struck the strung-out battalion and killed or wounded nearly half of its fighters before the 2nd Battalion and the 1st Battalion of the 680th could come to assist. A foothold in Lyptsi was held, but the 169th now came under heavy attack from fighter-bombers which were assisting the attack of 3rd Panzer against the 244th. The rout of part of this division uncovered the left flank of the 169th so it was forced to abandon Lyptsi and withdraw eastward, in good order, to a new line based on height 203, while at the same time helping to scrape up units to fill the gap left by the 244th.

On May 16, 3rd Panzer, having eliminated the regiment of the 244th encircled at Ternovaya, struck north along the Murom valley toward Neskuchnoe. After a short artillery preparation at first light a force of as many as 100 armored vehicles struck the 434th Regiment and most of the 307th Artillery Regiment. The latter's 2nd Battalion (Sen. Lt. Vladimir Kamsagovich Kharazia) struck the armor with direct fire. In the subsequent fighting the senior lieutenant, his chief of staff, and dozens of soldiers fell killed or wounded, but the attack was halted, with an estimated 30 vehicles knocked out. Kharazia was personally credited with eight of them while acting as a gun layer before he was killed, and he would be posthumously made a Hero of the Soviet Union.

Over the following days efforts were made to revive the offensive of the northern group, including an order from Timoshenko on May 17 that the 169th was to attack westward to join the 175th. In the event, this was forestalled when the 3rd and 23rd Panzers, with the 71st Infantry Division, renewed their drive toward Ternovaya. The remnants of 244th Division were taken by surprise and driven off to the northeast, uncovering the Murom axis. The German garrison was relieved and 38th Division was forced to withdraw 2-3km to the east. The 169th was also forced to pull back 5-8km northward, finally taking up positions with second echelon units of 5th Guards Cavalry Division and occupied defenses in the height 207–Kozlov–Bezbozhnye sector. The 169th, along with the regiment of the 175th that had been detached against paratroops, put up a strong defense in the Arapovka–Ploskoe area and halted any further advance on Murom. By this time the southern shock group, and indeed all the Soviet forces in the Izium salient, were in danger of encirclement and destruction due to the counteroffensive launched the same day by 1st Panzer Army in the area of Barvinkove.

Overnight the 244th was sent to the rear; it would be disbanded within a few months. Captured documents now convinced Timoshenko that the two panzer divisions would change their attack axis to the southeast in an effort to link up with 1st Panzer Army. In order to prevent this he ordered the 28th and 38th Armies to continue offensive operations on May 18 with all available forces. The 169th and 162nd Divisions were to make a concentrated attack to reach Veseloe, height 205, and Petrovskoe. Despite the danger to the forces of Southwestern and Southern Fronts in the Barvinkove salient, Stalin refused to abandon the offensive on Kharkiv. 38th Army began its attack at 0700 hours, but due to organizational difficulties 28th Army did not get underway until 1130. The 169th Division was nailed down by air attacks and while the 162nd made some initial gains it was soon forced back to its start line. Meanwhile, the shift of German forces allowed 38th Division to again encircle Ternovaya.

On May 19, 28th Army again went over to the attack at 0930 hours, as did the 38th Army, but with no greater success than the day before. In the afternoon in the 21st Army's sector the 168th Infantry Division struck the 293rd Rifle Division and drove it back from Murom. This forced General Ryabyshev to commit scant reserves to cover his flank and rear. Meanwhile, 3rd Panzer was indeed on the move, but contrary to Timoshenko's understanding it had moved through Lyptsi and was concentrating, along with the 57th Infantry Division, to the northwest of the main body of the 175th Division. Unaware of this, Ryabyshev ordered all his forces, except the 175th, to go over to the attack again at first light on May 20. The advance was initially successful until it ran into the positions of 23rd Panzer near Vesele. At noon a German counterattack was launched against the 175th and 169th. Under pressure of armor, and almost continuous air attacks, the two divisions began to withdraw to the east, uncovering the flank of 21st Army's 227th Division to the north. By the end of the day all the units along the boundary flanks of the two Armies had been forced back 10-15km with heavy losses. The northern shock group was now along a line from Murom to Ternovaya and then south along the west bank of the Bolshaya Babka River.

Having attained this success, 6th Army did not press the offensive on this sector, but instead began to withdraw the two panzer divisions back to Lyptsi as a preliminary to redeployment toward the Barvinkove salient, where the Soviet situation was going from bad to worse. During the following days the 21st, 28th, and 38th Armies were limited to local attacks to improve positions. Timoshenko soon ordered the 169th, 175th and 227th withdrawn from the front for rebuilding, along with all the tank brigades that had supported the northern shock group. On the afternoon of May 22 the encirclement of the southern shock group and two armies of Southern Front was completed, and these forces were reduced and largely destroyed by the end of the month.

=== Operation Wilhelm ===
In early June the 169th was in much the same place as it had been at the start of the Kharkiv offensive, southwest of Vovchansk in a bridgehead over the Northern Donets centered on Staryi Saltiv. As a preliminary to the main German summer offensive Gen. F. Paulus, commander of 6th Army, intended to eliminate the bridgehead in a pincer attack in order to gain crossing points over the Donets. Altogether the bridgehead contained seven rifle divisions, five from 28th Army, including the 169th, plus two of 21st Army. All of these were under strength, backed by four weak tank brigades, three more rifle divisions and three cavalry divisions. The assault began early on June 10 and took the defenders by surprise. The four infantry divisions of VIII Army Corps took only two days to clear the bridgehead and capture Vovchansk. Meanwhile, the III Motorized Corps broke through the defenses of 38th Army to the south. Under the circumstances the 28th Army began retreating almost as soon as the German attack was underway. Rainy weather began on June 11 and this slowed the advance, along with defensive actions and counterattacks by the tank brigades. By the time the pincers closed on June 15 most of the Soviet forces had escaped, losing 24,800 men taken prisoner, largely from the now-shattered 28th Army; the 169th was reported by Timoshenko on June 13 as "seriously battered".

== Operation Blue and Stalingrad ==
By the start of the main German summer offensive in late June, 28th Army had five rifle divisions in various states of repair (13th and 15th Guards Rifle, 38th, 169th, and 175th), plus three battered tank brigades, numbering in total about 90 tanks. The Army's defenses along the Oskil River were in a single echelon, with the 169th on the right flank. were penetrated by XXXX Panzer Corps, supported by three Army Corps, on June 30, but the resistance of the 169th, along with the two Guards divisions and 13th Tank Corps, limited the advance. By July 10, 28th Army reported the division "was fighting in the Zhuravka region with 100 fighters", and these remnants made their way north of the Don in the following days.

On July 31 the remnants of the division were withdrawn into the Stalingrad Military District, along with the 13th Guards. On August 31 Stalin ordered that this District become a new 28th Army, effective September 5. It was to operate on the left flank of the new Southeastern Front after forming up at Astrakhan. Meanwhile the STAVKA organized a new 7th Rifle Corps, consisting of the 169th, the 141st Rifle Brigade, plus three other rifle brigades, in order to cover the gap between the Front and the Army in the area of Verkhny Baskunchak. After over a month of rest and refitting, by September 11 the division was back up to a strength of 8,028 officers and men; 6,679 new men arrived from hospitals, the Tashkent Machinegun-Mortar School, the Astrakhan Infantry School, and reserve regiments. General Rogachevskii left the division on September 25 to take up the post of chief of staff of 28th Army, which he would hold for the duration of the war. He was replaced by now-Colonel Zelinskii, but he in turn handed the command on October 7 to Col. Yakov Filippovich Yeryomenko. This officer had led the 116th Rifle Division in 1941 before being wounded and hospitalized and had been chief of staff of 28th Army in September; he would be promoted to major general on March 1, 1943. On October 29 the 169th had reached nearly-full strength of 9,424 and was assigned to 57th Army on the west bank of the Volga, south of Stalingrad.

=== Beketovka Bridgehead ===
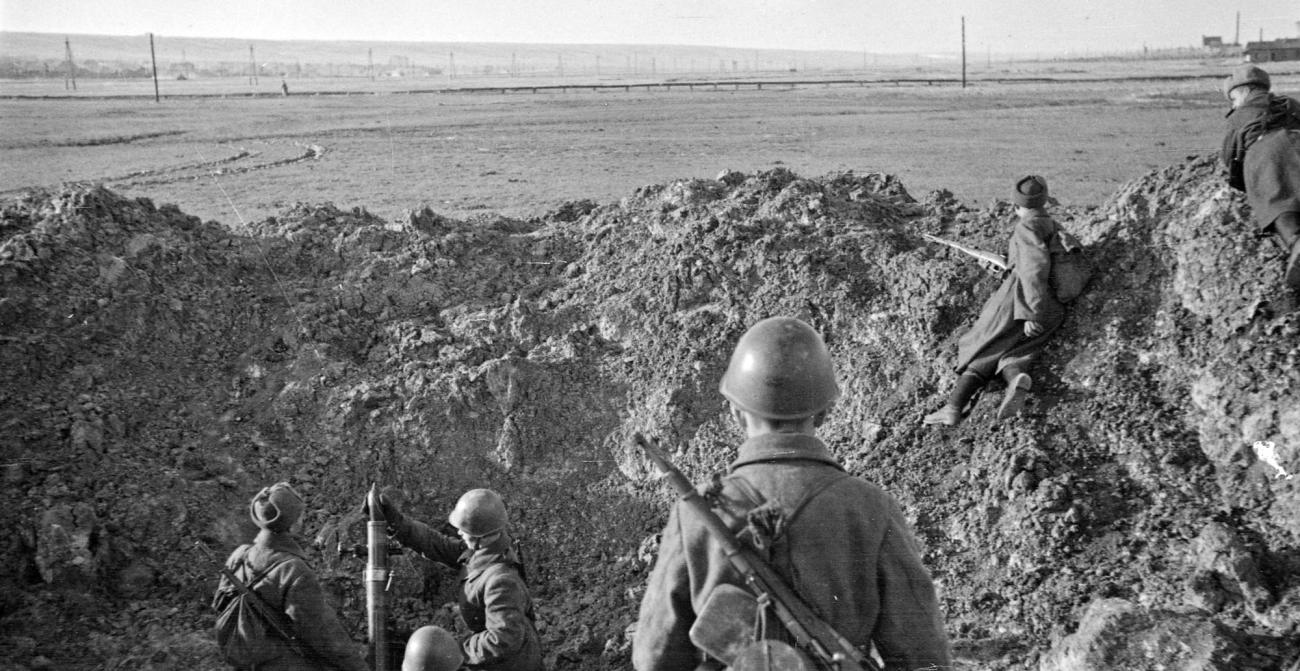
Sergeant Ivan Yakovlevich Razumny's mortar crew of the 434th Rifle Regiment in a firing position in a shell crater, late October to early November 1942. This scene was shot in the rear southeast of Sarepta when the division was in the second echelon. Razumn was killed in action on 20 October 1943.

On October 17 the commander of Stalingrad Front, Col. Gen. A. I. Yeryomenko, submitted a plan to the STAVKA for a further effort to break through to the encircled 62nd Army in the city, or at least to divert German forces from the battle there. The so-called Beketovka bridgehead on the west bank of the Volga south of the city was held by 64th Army and faced the German 71st Infantry and 29th Motorized Divisions, plus part of the 371st Infantry Division, along a 9km-wide front from south of Kuporosnoe to roughly 5km west of Gornaya Polyana. According to the plan the Army's shock group was to penetrate the 371st and advance to the Tsaritsa River to link up with 13th Guards in the city center. While this was exceptionally ambitious, Yeryomenko more realistically expected to draw one infantry and one panzer division from the battle in the city.

The plan called for the shock group to be formed from the relatively fresh 93rd, 96th and 97th Rifle Brigades of 7th Corps and the 169th, all of which had been transferred to the Army, plus the 422nd and 126th Rifle Divisions, for a total of some 30,000 troops, backed by 80 tanks from four depleted brigades, 92 Guards mortars, and 243 guns. The force was deployed in two echelons, with the 93rd and 97th Brigades and 422nd Division, and two tank brigades in first, the 126th Division, 96th Brigade, and two tank brigades in second, and the 169th in general reserve to reinforce where and as needed. The first phase of the attack was to begin at dawn on October 23 and Yeryomenko estimated it would take 10 days to complete. In the event, due to difficulties in organization it did not kick off until 0900 hours on October 25; the 371st lost several hundred metres of ground in Kuporosnoe to the 422nd, plus as much as 2km west of the town, but soon stabilized the situation, although fighting continued until November 1.

== Operation Uranus ==
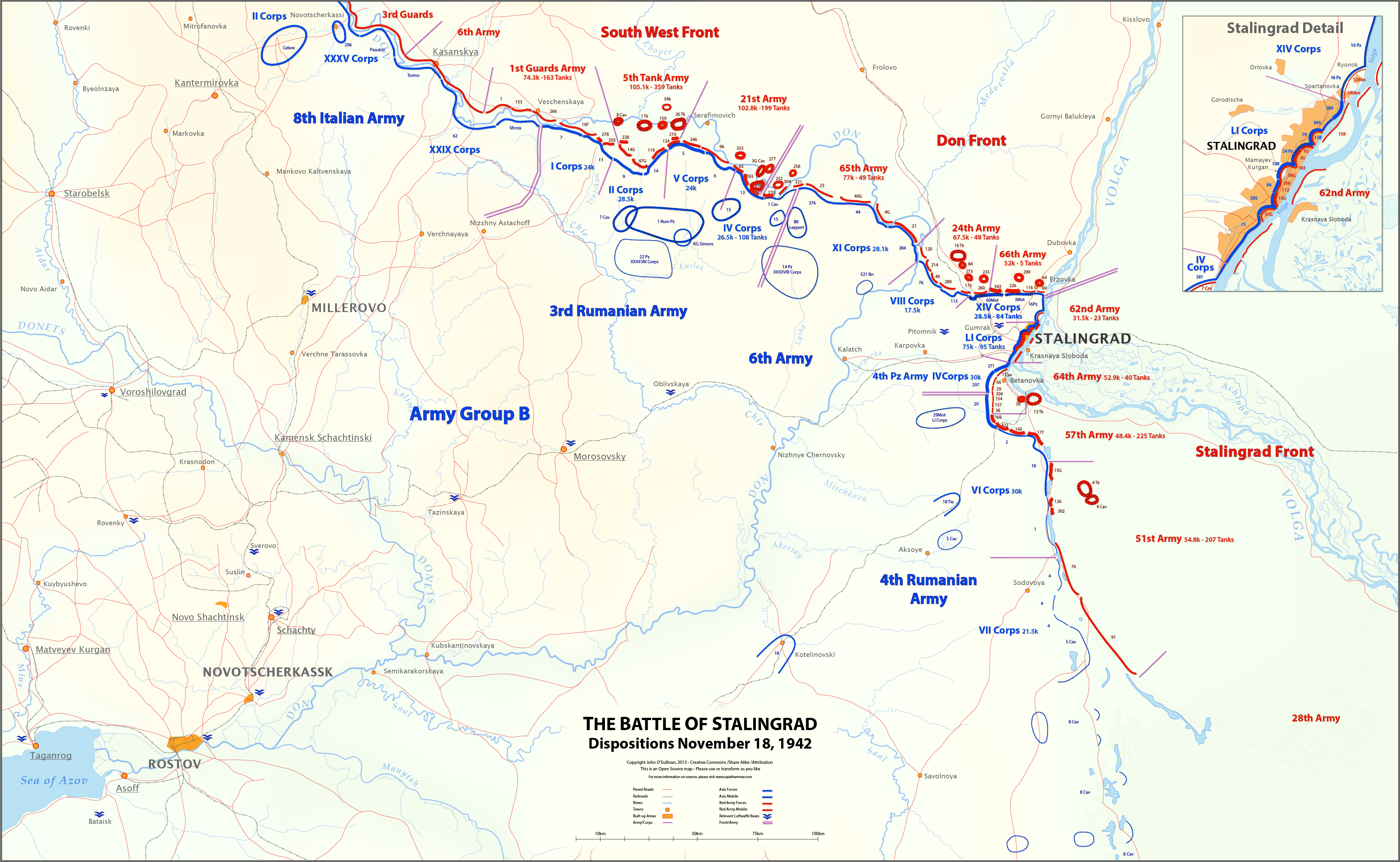
Preparations for Operation Uranus. Note positions of 169th and 422nd Divisions south of Stalingrad.

In preparation for the strategic counteroffensive to encircle 6th Army in and west of Stalingrad, the 169th was transferred to 57th Army in early November and moved southwards, to the vicinity of Tundutovo and Ivanovka, and reinforced. This Army was under command of Lt. Gen. F. I. Tolbukhin. According to the operational plan he was to attack at the junction of Romanian 20th and 2nd Infantry Divisions, which also formed the boundary between 4th Panzer Army and Romanian 4th Army. Once a penetration was made the 13th Tank Corps would be introduced into the gap. For the offensive the 169th was to be supported by 90th Tank Brigade, and would advance west to take up a line from Andreevka and Koshary Station. The other half of 57th Army's shock group, 422nd Division with 143rd Rifle and 235th Tank Brigades, was to move southward with the intention of encircling 2nd Infantry in cooperation with 15th Guards Division of 51st Army.

After a 75-minute artillery preparation, which ended with five minutes of massed Guards mortar fire, the shock group stepped off at 1115 hours on November 20 and easily penetrated the defenses of the under-strength 2nd Infantry, which had only four battalions and a company under command; it suffered "tank fright" and was virtually routed in the first hour. By mid-afternoon the shock group had advanced 6-8km and the 169th had captured Khara-Uson, Erdeshkin, Nariman, and the eastern approaches to the Shosha Balka (ravine). Under Tolbukhin's plan the 13th Tank Corps was to enter the penetration and exploit northwestward, but this was delayed until 1620 due to difficulties in crossing the Volga. In the evening the 169th came under attack by the 29th Motorized, which drove it back from Nariman; quick action by the 90th Tank Brigade saved the day by engaging the German armor and destroying several tanks. The division lost 93 men killed and 257 wounded in this action. 13th Tanks' 163rd Tank Regiment next came under attack and suffered heavy losses, as did accompanying riflemen of the 169th and 422nd. The battle seesawed through the night and next day, until the German division was ordered northward towards Stalingrad, after which the 169th and its supporting tanks continued to exploit their penetration westwards.

Throughout November 21 the combined forces of the shock group, the 163rd Tanks, and 62nd Mechanized Brigade struggled to retake Nariman from rearguards of 29th Motorized. At midnight the German division was ordered to begin withdrawing to more secure defenses south of Karpovka. During November 23 Tolbukhin's Army resumed its advance to the northwest, moving past German defenses on the west bank of the Chervlenaya River toward Karpovka, spearheaded by 13th Tanks with its remaining 120 tanks. On the same day elements of the Army linked up with units of 21st Army at Sovetskii and the encirclement of 6th Army was completed. The next day the Army's advance on its right flank faltered soon after it began against due to the strong defenses and incessant counterattacks. This was the 169th's flank and it was now cooperating with the 36th Guards Rifle Division of 64th Army in repeated attacks on the 297th Infantry Division, defending the strongpoints of Tsybenko and Kravtsov. Elements of the division managed to penetrate into Tsybenko several times during the day before being finally expelled by nightfall. By November 25 the situation along the south face of the pocket had essentially become a siege operation. 36th Guards and its sector east of the Chervlenaya was transferred to 57th Army as the 169th was moved eastward to take over the sector, allowing the guardsmen to rest and refit.

During November 25-27 the 169th and 422nd made repeated assaults along both banks of the Chervlenaya in an effort to envelop Tsybenko from west and east. The 169th had taken a small bridgehead north of the Karavatka Balka, which served as the base of its attacks. The village, as well as its southeastern and eastern approaches, were held by the 1st and 2nd Battalions of 371st Infantry's 670th Regiment. The 169th's divisional history describes the frustrating battle as follows:

The division fought to capture Tsybenko from 25 through 29 November, but failed. There were three large enemy minefields in that region. Sappers neutralized them [and] quite often attacked and destroyed the enemy along with the riflemen... 680th, 434th, and 556th Rifle Regiments advanced forward a bit and occupied defenses in the vicinity of the heights on front of Tsybenko.

By now it was clear that 57th Army had failed to reach its objective of clearing the road and rail line from Marinovka to Karpovka, and operations over the following weeks would resemble a prolonged siege. The counteroffensive had taken its toll, and by December 4 the strength of the division was back down to a total of 5,574 personnel.

== Operation Ring ==
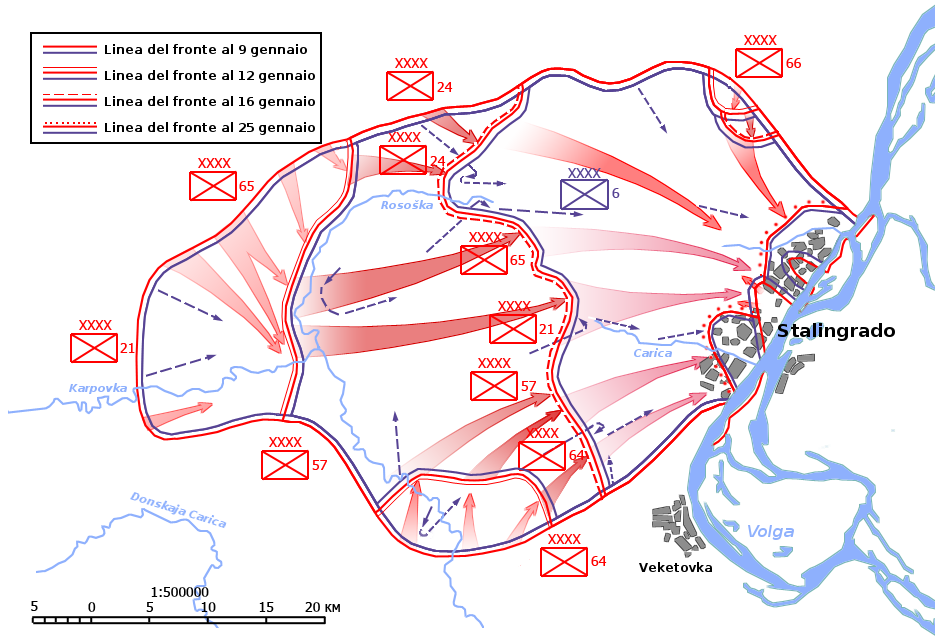
Operation Ring. Note positions of 64th Army.

During December the 169th returned to 64th Army, which was in Don Front as of December 30. 4th Panzer Army launched Operation Winter Storm, the effort to relieve 6th Army, on December 12, and two days later the STAVKA halted active operations against the pocket until this crisis was averted. Winter Storm was halted by December 23, and Operation Koltso (Ring) began on January 10, 1943. According to the final plan the 64th Army would initially mount supporting attacks, once again along the Chervlenaya. As the offensive developed the main shock groups were to compress 6th Army eastward into the city, and 64th Army would eventually exploit north and northeast to add weight to the push. At this time most of the Front's rifle divisions had 4,500 to 5,500 personnel each but the German force was severely weakened by previous fighting and lack of supplies to the failed airlift.

64th Army organized its main thrust in the 6km-wide sector from south of height 111.6 east to Elkhi. The shock group consisted of 36th Guards and 204th Rifle Divisions, 143rd Rifle Brigade, and 157th Rifle Division, and was supported by 51 tanks. 29th Rifle Division and 154th Naval Rifle Brigade were in second echelon while a motorized rifle brigade served as a mobile reserve. The remainder of the Army, including the 169th, was deployed in defensive positions from Elkhi to the Volga south of Kuporosnoe, with the division on the left flank. The Front commander, Lt. Gen. K. K. Rokossovskii, issued an ultimatum on January 8 to Gen. F. Paulus of 6th Army offering terms for surrender, but this was turned down.

By the end of the first day the defenses of German IV Army Corps had been pierced on a broad sector west and east of the Chervlenaya and the strongpoint at Tsybenko was in the process of being encircled. In addition to heavy casualties the 297th and 371st Infantry Divisions had lost 26 of their combined 54 antitank guns. On January 11, 64th Army was to continue its advance both to gain territory and prevent German forces from shifting to the west side of the pocket, which was beginning to collapse; in fact, IV Corps had no reserves to spare. The Corps reported a large breach that it could neither repair nor retake, it continued to hold a containment line from Tsybenko to height 119.7 which held 64th Army back from its immediate objective, the rail line at Basargino and Voroponovo Station. In order to accelerate the capture of Tsybenko the 29th Division and 154th Naval Brigade were released from second echelon.

Tsybenko finally fell to the 422nd Division on January 12. The next day the continued advance of 64th Army enveloped height 119.7 and Elkhi from the west and northwest, demolishing the right wing and center of the 297th Infantry. During January 14 the Army's forces were reshuffled, but continued resistance at Elkhi prevented any advance by the 169th. Over the next two days the pace of the offensive slowed and Rokossovskii, who was promoted to colonel general on the 15th, paused operations from January 18-21. 64th Army spent these four days preparing for the final drive; on the 22km-wide attack sector of 21st, 57th and 64th Armies 4,100 guns (76mm calibre or larger) and 75 tanks (mostly KV models) were concentrated.

Ring resumed on January 22, when 64th Army took the Staro-Dubovka region. The advance resumed the next day; 36th Guards and 29th Divisions captured Peschanka from the 297th Infantry and then pushed eastward toward Verkhnaya Elshanka, which provided the 169th and 157th a gap to exploit toward the northeast. Together they seized Zelenaya Polyana, just 4km from the outskirts of Stalingrad's southern suburbs. During January 24 the size of the pocket was reduced by about 33 percent as the German forces outside the city fell back toward the ruins. The following day 64th Army began a general advance through the suburbs, with the division assisting in the liberation of Elshanka and Minina. On January 27 the STAVKA issued orders for the 169th and 157th, plus two rifle brigades, to be withdrawn from the Army into the Reserve of the Supreme High Command, although in the case of the 169th this was not completed until February 5.

== Operation Kutuzov ==
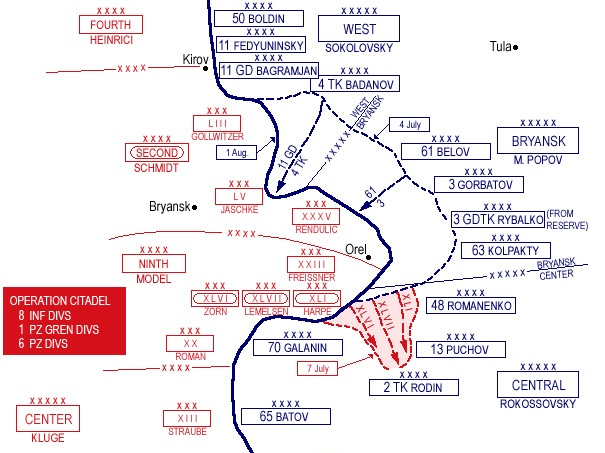
Map of Operation Kutuzov. Note position of 11th Guards Army.

The division's time in the Reserve was about five weeks, during which it was moved northward by rail. On March 13 it was assigned to Western Front, where it initially came under direct Front command. 16th Army was redesignated as 11th Guards Army on May 1, and by the beginning of June the 169th had joined that Army as part of the 16th Guards Rifle Corps, along with the 1st, 16th, and 31st Guards Rifle Divisions.

In the planning for the operation against German 9th Army in the Oryol salient the 11th Guards Army, under command of Lt. Gen. I. Kh. Bagramyan, was to launch the Front's main attack. It was to defend along a front of 22km on its right flank with the 217th Rifle Division while concentrating 11 rifle divisions, including the 169th, as a shock group on the left flank. This was backed by two tank corps, four tank brigades, two Guards heavy tank regiments (KV tanks), five artillery brigades, 38 artillery regiments, plus other artillery and air assets. The attack sector was 14km wide from Glinnaya to Ozhigovo, where the German 211th and 293rd Infantry Divisions shared a boundary. After penetrating the defense the attackers were to advance in the direction of Belyi Verkh, Ulyanovo and Krapvina, and by the end of the second day the line of the Resseta River was to be reached. From here the Army was to move toward Bolkhov in an effort to encircling the German forces there in cooperation with 61st Army of Bryansk Front. The 169th was one of six divisions in the Army's first echelon. 16th Guards Corps had the 4th Guards Heavy Tank Regiment, 29th Guards Tank Brigade, and a self-propelled artillery regiment in direct support of the first echelon.

Preparations for the attack were effectively complete by July 10, while the fighting for the Kursk salient to the south was ongoing. The main offensive was preceded on July 11 by a reconnaissance-in-force to uncover the German fire plan and ascertain the forward edge of the defense. Each of the Army's first echelon divisions created a reinforced battalion for this purpose, and these attacked at 0300 hours following a 10-minute artillery bombardment. The battalions were also supported by reserve artillery fire. This fighting continued through the day and the first trench line, thinly held as expected, was taken, and the attackers continued to the second line, where the main German forces were located. On this basis many adjustments to the artillery and air preparation plan were made, while the false impression of having defeated the opening of a main offensive was left with many of the defenders.

The next morning at 0300 hours the reconnaissance battalions handed their positions over to fresh forces. The artillery preparation began at 0320 and proved effective in part due to the good target intelligence. The complex bombardment lasted a total of two hours and 40 minutes and disrupted the defense to a depth of as much as 6km. A rolling barrage began at 0600 and the infantry went over to the attack at 0605, accompanied by the heavy tanks. The forward edge of the defense was penetrated by 0700 against minimal resistance, at which point the tank brigades were committed through the first echelon rifle divisions. The main resistance zone, with its many strongpoints, was soon seized while the tanks broke through to the intermediate zone. The two German divisions, supported by reserves from LIII Army Corps, began to recover and attempt to consolidate on a line from Zhelyabova to Rechitsa while also launching counterattacks, which were driven off with heavy casualties. German air attacks increased and units of 5th Panzer Division began to appear in the breakthrough zone. By the end of the day 16th Guards Corps, developing its attack to the southwest, had reached a line from 3km northeast of Ozerny to Krasnyi Oktyabr. Overall, the Army had gained up to 12km and partly broken the second German defense line.

During July 13 the 16th Guards Corps, less 1st Guards Division which was fighting near Staritsa, continued to widen the breach to the southwest and by day's end had reached a line from Chernyshino to Dudorovo, which completed the breach of the third defense line. Bagramyan's Army had now penetrated to a depth of 12-25km on a 23km-wide front, had routed the two German infantry divisions and elements of 5th Panzer, and favorable conditions had been created for a further attack toward Bolkhov or to cut the Oryol–Bryansk railroad and paved road. The German command was reacting by rushing reserves from the rear and other sectors of the front. The next day units of 20th Panzer Division and three infantry divisions arrived on the breakthrough sector, with more following during July 15-19. These were intended not only to stop the breakthrough but to counterattack the base of the penetration and restore the original line.

=== Fighting on the Resseta ===
50th Army to the north had attacked unsuccessfully on July 13, and as 11th Guards continued to advance, albeit at a slower pace, 16th Guards Corps was forced to extend its sector in order retain contact. It was now fighting along the Resseta River with its right flank units, attempting to take crossings and bridgeheads on the left bank against the influx of German reserves, including 5th Panzer and 183rd Infantry Divisions. The heaviest resistance was in the Kholmishchi–Khatkovo–Moilovo–Ktsyn area, where the Corps faced continual counterattacks from infantry and tanks. In a few placed the Soviet forces were pushed back from recent gains. Despite this, after two days of fighting, on July 17 the 169th cleared Khatkovo and, developing its success, also took Suseya in a turning movement. On July 19 it cooperated with 31st Guards Division, with some support from 1st Guards, to capture the village of Brusny. By the end of this day the Corps had reached a line from the woods 2km southeast of Chishche to Brusny to the northern outskirts of Moilovo, but German forces had managed to retain Moilovo and Ktsyn, from where they continued to threaten the right side of the base of the penetration, which was now more than 70km deep.

50th Army had regrouped and attacked again on July 14, this time breaking through on a narrow frontage before going over to a general offensive on July 17. This had assisted the success of 16th Guards Corps by reducing the length of its sector. Following the capture of Brusny the Corps reached from the Kholunya River to the northeast outskirts of Moilovo on July 20 in stubborn fighting. Steady rain over the past days was also slowing the advance. While German reinforcements were arriving, the STAVKA had decided to transfer 11th Army to Western Front, as well as 4th Tank Army and 2nd Guards Cavalry Corps, which would arrive later. Bagramyan was directed to attack with his left wing southward in order to cut the Oryol–Byransk roads, while part of its forces would also help 61st Army to encircle and destroy the German Bolkhov grouping. In order to shorten his front the 16th Guards Corps was transferred to 11th Army. However, the 169th was shifted to the left wing, where it joined the 36th Guards Rifle Corps. 11th Guards Army itself would soon be transferred to Bryansk Front.

=== Battles for Bolkhov ===
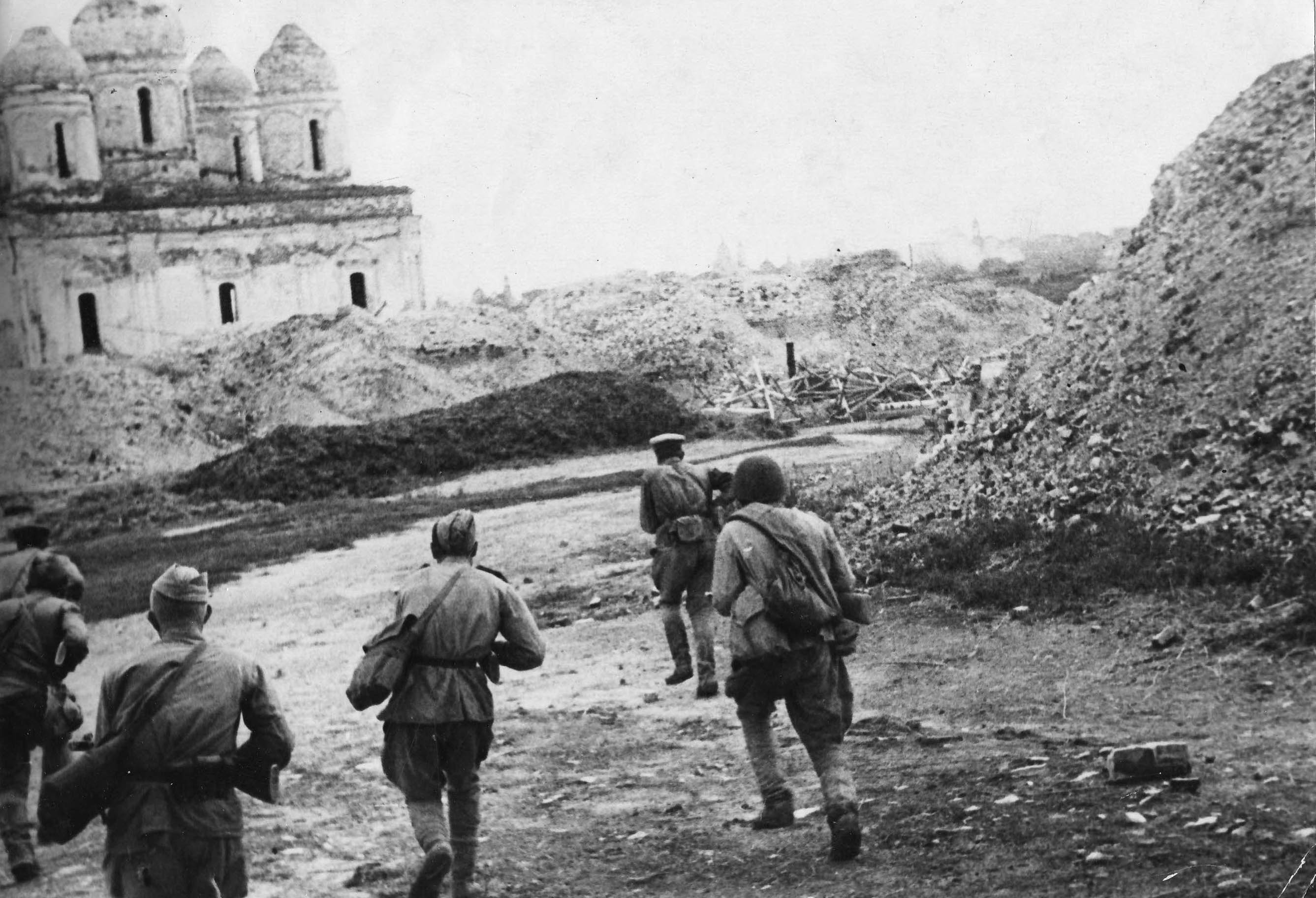
Soviet submachine gunners advancing through Bolkhov

The 36th and 8th Guards Rifle Corps, with 25th Tank Corps, went back to the offensive on July 23 and by the 25th had reached the jumping-off point for a decisive attack on the Bolkhov grouping. The two Guards Corps were to break through the German defense along the Perkovo–Luchki sector, secure the commitment of 4th Tank Army into the breach, and subsequently outflank Khotynets from the east while part of their forces followed 4th Tanks in the general direction of Borilovo. The final offensive on Bolkhov began on July 26 after an hour-long artillery preparation. 36th Guards Corps made little progress against powerful defenses. Under the circumstances the 4th Tanks had to be committed to try to make the actual breach. Despite this defensive success the German command issued orders in the evening to evacuate Bolkhov. On July 29 units of 11th Guards Army finally broke through and by the evening the 61st Army had cleared the town. The following day the Corps, in conjunction with 25th Tanks, continued a slow advance to a line from Brezhnevskii to Proletarskii by July 30.

On July 31 Sen. Lt. Pyotr Evpsipovich Tatarkin was killed in action near the village of Korobetskoye. He was the commander of a battery of regimental guns of the 434th Rifle Regiment who distinguished himself in the first days of the offensive. On July 12, while accompanying the advancing riflemen, he had directed fire which destroyed five firing points, two bunkers, and suppressed the fire of a German mortar battery while causing roughly 200 casualties. The next day, as one rifle battalion was counterattacked by up to two battalions, Tatarkin's battery was in support, and was surrounded with the riflemen. Leaving his subordinate to direct gunfire at point-blank range he led most of his gunners into the attack, which was followed by the riflemen. After hand-to-hand combat the attackers fell back with losses, of which 27 were credited to Tatarkin personally, in spite of suffering an arm wound. On April 6, 1944 he would be posthumously made a Hero of the Soviet Union.

=== Battles for Khotynets ===
From July 31 to August 5 Bagramyan's Army, along with 4th Tank Army, was involved in stubborn fighting for control of the paved road and railroad between Oryol and Bryansk. By the morning of August 6 it had again handed over its right-flank sector to 11th Army and had regrouped for an offensive on Khotynets. 36th Guards Corps occupied a start line on a 7km-wide sector from the Vytebet River west of Ilinskoe to the northern outskirts of Brezhnevskii and was to attack with 1st Tank Corps in the direction of Studenka and Obraztsovo, outflanking Khotynets from the northwest and east. 11th Guards Army as a whole was to break through between Ilinskoe and Gnezdilovo to create a breach for 4th Tanks and then encircle and capture Khotynets before developing the offensive toward Karachev. 36th Guards Corps, with 1st Tanks, was to attack toward Studenka and Obreztsovo, which would outflank Khotynets from the northwest and east. For this purpose it was reinforced with a tank brigade, a tank regiment, two self-propelled artillery regiments, and several artillery assets.

The renewed offensive began with reconnaissance operations by each first-echelon division at 0600 hours on August 6, followed by an artillery and airstrike preparation at noon. The 8th and 36th Guards Corps with heavy tank support went over to the attack at 1300 and quickly broke through the forward edge of the German defense, which was soon falling back to its intermediate line. The garrison of Ilinskoe attempted to slow the assault, but was outflanked by the 169th and the 18th Guards Rifle Division on either side. This led to a rout in which some 1,000 dead and considerable weaponry was left on the battlefield. By 1530 hours the infantry had penetrated up to 3km and the 1st Tanks was committed. Late in the day the right-flank units of 36th Guards Corps were successfully advancing and reached the approaches to Klemenovo the next morning. Despite these initial successes the German forces used broken ground and village strongpoints to delay the offensive.

On August 8 units of the 25th Panzergrenadier Division appeared on the approaches to Khotynets. Further reserves arrived the next day and two armored trains were coursing along the railroad. Despite this, on August 9 fighting began on the immediate approaches to the town and individual strongpoints changed hands several times. By day's end elements of the 36th Guards Corps and the 1st Tanks were fighting along the outskirts of Abolmasovo, Voeikovo and Khotynets itself while units of 8th Guards Corps and 25th Tanks outflanked Khotynets from the south and cut the railroad. The town was now outflanked from three sides and on the morning of August 10 was completely cleared of German forces as remnants fell back to the west; the battle had cost them 7,500 officers and men, 70 armored vehicles and 176 guns and mortars. In the pursuit the next day the 36th Corps reached the eastern outskirts of Yurevo and straddled the Khotynets–Karachev road southeast of Yakovlevo. The 169th was now moved to Bagramyan's reserve and concentrated in the area of Moshchenoe. On September 5 it was assigned to 8th Guards Corps, but on September 19 it was moved to 63rd Army, still in Bryansk Front. In late September the Army was transferred to Central Front (soon renamed Belorussian Front) and the 169th soon became part of 40th Rifle Corps.

== Battles in Belarus ==
As part of this Front the division again came under command of Army Gen. Rokossovsky. As of October 1 it was facing the XXIII Army Corps of 9th Army in the area of Gomel.

=== Gomel-Rechytsa Offensive ===
This offensive took place in several stages. In the first stage the 63rd was one of five armies tasked with seizing and expanding multiple bridgeheads over the Pronya, Sozh, and Dniepr Rivers north and south of Gomel. One of these had been created by 5th and 250th Rifle Divisions when they captured Vietka from the 253rd Infantry Division on the west bank of the Sozh, north of Gomel, between September 30-October 3. The initial efforts to expand this bridgehead were unsuccessful. The Army commander, Lt. Gen. V. Ya. Kolpakchi, now reinforced it with 40th Corps' 287th and 348th Rifle Divisions, with the aim of breaking out and attacking the forces of German XXXV Army Corps defending the Gomel bridgehead from the north. This effort fared no better. The offensive's second stage began on October 15, and gained a significant bridgehead over the Dniepr on 65th Army's front. This stage ended on October 20 and the offensive as a whole was halted on November 1.

The next phase, launched by 3rd and 50th Armies on November 22, is sometimes referred to as the Novyi Bykhov-Propoisk Offensive. The initial role of 63rd Army was "to attract the enemy's attention away from the [Front's] main attack axis" and then "attack toward Zhlobin to envelop the enemy Gomel-Rechitsa grouping from the northwest." Following a successful penetration by 3rd Army the 63rd attacked across the Sozh River on November 26 in an effort to reach the Dniepr between Rahachow and Zhlobin. The attack was led by 40th Corps and soon joined 3rd Army's pursuit of XXXV Corps. By the end of the month the two Armies closed up to a new defense line west and northeast of Potapovka and the front stabilized. This left a sizeable German bridgehead on the east bank of the Dniepr.

General Yeryomenko left the division on December 23 and was hospitalized in January 1944. After recovering he was sent to the far east where he took command of the 255th Rifle Division, and later two Guards divisions, but was again hospitalized in January 1945 and died of illness a month later. He was replaced by Col. Ivan Petrovich Mishin, but this officer was in turn replaced on January 21 by Col. Fyodor Andreevich Verevkin. He had previously led the 199th Rifle Division and most recently the 10th Reserve Rifle Brigade. He would be promoted to major general on September 13 and would lead the division into the postwar.

=== Rahachow-Zhlobin Offensive ===
On February 18, 63rd Army was disbanded and 40th Corps was reassigned to 3rd Army, in what was now 1st Belorussian Front; the 169th would remain under this Army and Corps, almost continuously, until the end of the war. Up to February 21 the Army was defending and preparing for an offensive with the aim of forcing the Dniepr; by this date its front extended 88km from Rudnia along the Dniepr to Zhlobin. The Rahachow-Zhlobin Offensive began that day, preceded by an extensive air preparation and a 10-minute artillery fire raid, but the former 63rd Army divisions were in second echelon. The 169th was directly southeast of Rahachow facing the 707th Security Division. The town was liberated on February 24 and the division received a battle honor:

ROGACHEV... 169th Rifle Division (Colonel Verevkin, Fyodor Andreevich)... The troops who participated in the liberation of Rogachev, by the order of the Supreme High Command of 24 February 1944, and a commendation in Moscow, are given a salute of 12 artillery salvoes from 124 guns.

When the offensive was halted on February 26 the 3rd Army had advanced almost 30km, placing the Front's forces in ideal positions from which to mount an offensive toward Babruysk come summer.

== Operation Bagration ==
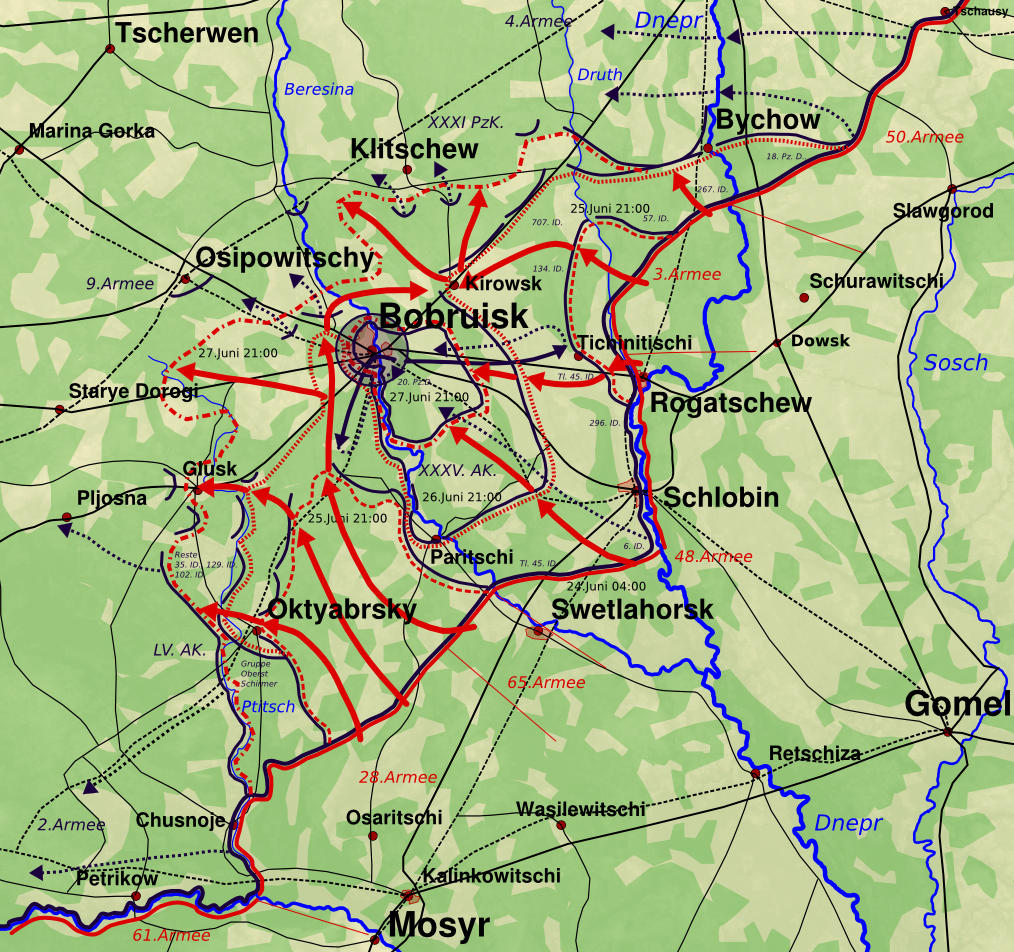
Babruysk operation. Note thrust of 3rd Army's right flank toward Bykhaw.

3rd Army was under command of A. V. Gorbatov, who would be promoted to the rank of colonel general on June 29. At the start of the summer offensive 40th Corps consisted of the 169th and 129th Divisions. Gorbatov's right flank extended from Yanovo to Khomichi, while he intended to launch his main attack on his left flank in cooperation with 48th Army to the south. The right flank was to be securely held by 40th Corps and the 283rd Rifle Division of 80th Rifle Corps. 40th Corps was specifically directed to prevent any breakthrough in the direction of Novy Bykhaw. According to the plan, by the end of the seventh day the Army was to reach a line from Chigirinka to Barki to Orlino to the east bank of the Berezina River.

=== Babruysk Offensive ===
The main offensive on this sector started on June 23. 40th Corps began with a shattering artillery barrage of 45 minutes beginning at 0200 hours against the sector held by German XII Corps near Rahachow, followed by regimental-sized attacks against the 267th Infantry and 18th Panzergrenadier Divisions. This was intended as a holding attack to divert attention from the main attack on the left. This made moderate progress on this first day and was renewed on June 24 at 0400 following another heavy bombardment lasting two hours, and the first line of trenches fell by 0800, but then stalled until the weather cleared and airstrikes could begin. The next day at 1000 Gorbatov's 35th and 41st Rifle Corps struck the 134th Infantry Division, and at noon the 9th Tank Corps joined the assault. The tanks soon crossed the road from Mogilev to Babruysk and advanced 10km toward the latter, with 40th, 41st, and 80th Corps following in its wake. Six German divisions were now in danger of encirclement southeast of Babruysk.

During June 27 the 48th, 3rd and 65th Armies advanced without much opposition to both encircle Babruysk and eliminate the three isolated German divisions that had been in the Zhlobin–Rahachow area. The 3rd and 48th forced a crossing of the Ola River off the march, which compromised the defensive zone based on it. Elements of 3rd Army also forced the Olsa River on a 10km-wide sector and got into the rear of the German Bykhaw grouping, which cut its retreat routes to the southwest and west; this advance also threatened the rail connection of the Mogilev grouping. Given the position at day's end, Rokossovskii tasked 48th Army with eliminating the pocket southeast of Babruysk while 3rd and 65th, assisted by the Dniepr River Flotilla, captured the city itself. In the morning, mobile units of 65th Army cut all the roads from Babruysk to the west and northwest, while its 105th Rifle Corps cut the paved road to Hlusk and 1st Guards Tanks broke into the northern and northwestern outskirts. Meanwhile, Gorbatov, striving to capture Asipovichy, released 40th Corps from Army reserve. By dusk, one of its divisions had forced a crossing of the Berezina in the Shatkovo area and reached a line from that place to Sychkovo to Yeloviki, while fighting with German forces in the north outskirts of Babruysk.

=== Minsk Offensive ===
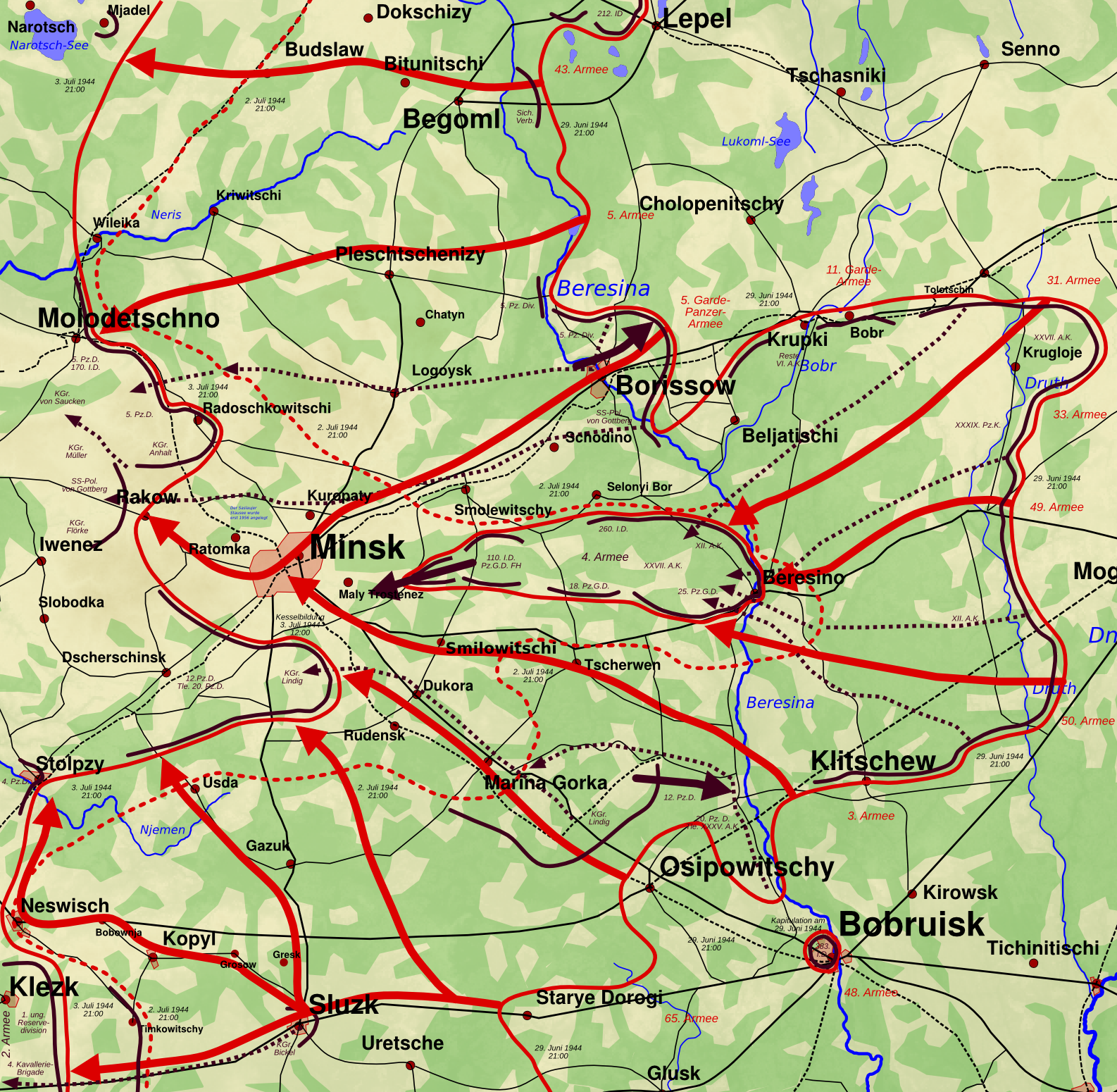
Minsk Offensive June 29 - July 3

On June 29 all three Armies cooperated to complete the liberation of Babruysk. In the evening the garrison of some 10,000 personnel, plus refugees from the divisions destroyed to the east, concentrated to attempt to break out to the west. Those who escaped mostly moved toward Asipovichy, but they were soon rounded up or re-encircled west of Shatkovo and Yeloviki. 40th, 41st, and 105th Corps were left to mop up the city. As this was happening, most of 3rd Army was expanding the offensive to the northwest. 40th Corps began moving on Chichevichy, now with the assistance of partisans of the Mogilev formation, and was largely pulled back into Army reserve on July 1. Between June 30-July 6 the 9th Tank Corps made a 200km deep "raid" into the Minsk area, and the 169th organized a forward detachment in support, composed of the 434th Rifle Regiment loaded onto every truck available, plus the 160th Antitank Battalion, with extra troops from the "Burevestnik" Partisan Brigade picked up along the way. This successful exploitation earned the division the Order of the Red Banner, awarded on July 25 for the liberation of Vawkavysk.

=== Into Eastern Poland ===
According to a STAVKA order of July 4 the 3rd Army was transferred to 2nd Belorussian Front. This Front, after eliminating the German pocket east of Minsk, was to continue the advance toward Novogrudok, Vawkavysk, and Białystok, crossing the Neman River in the process. The Army covered between 120km-140km between July 5-9 and reached the Neman after taking Novogrudok. At 0700 on July 12 the 40th Corps, in cooperation with 9th Tanks and 42nd Rifle Corps of 48th Army, captured Zelva. 2nd and 3rd Belorussian Fronts jointly stormed Grodno on July 16. Two days earlier 3rd Army had captured Vawkavysk, for which the 169th would be decorated. The Neman was the last major obstacle before East Prussia and the German command assembled more than 10 divisions in an effort to restore its line along it. During July 17-21, 2nd Belorussian Front was involved in heavy fighting with mixed results. With the commitment of 49th Army between the 3rd and 50th Armies and by July 24 the river had been forced in several places and the Front advanced 20km-30km to the outskirts of Białystok; this city was cleared on July 27 and both Fronts were soon close to the East Prussian border. The 556th Rifle Regiment (Lt. Colonel Kachur, Pyotr Vasilevich) was awarded the honorific "Białystok" for its role in this victory.

== Vistula-Oder Offensive ==
In November the 169th was moved to Front reserve, but in December it returned to 40th Corps, which now also contained the 5th and 129th Divisions. On January 2, 1945, just before the winter offensive began, the division had a strength of 6,712 troops, including 770 officers, 1,685 NCOs, and 4,257 enlisted; 42% of the division's personnel were either Communist Party members or Komsomols.

The operation began on January 14. 3rd Army was deployed along the line Młynarze - the height southeast of Dombrowka. 35th and 41st Corps were responsible for launching the main attack in the direction of Krasnosielc while 40th Corps was detached to for a supporting attack toward Aleksandrowo. By the end of the first day, 3rd Army had crushed the defending German 292nd and 129th Infantry Divisions and had broken through to a depth of 5km on a 10km front. However, on the next day, the Army's units ran into armor of the Grossdeutchland Panzer Division, halting the advance and even losing some ground. The advance continued on January 17 against strong resistance, and by the end of the day Krasnosielc was being contested. On February 19 the 556th Rifle, 680th Rifle, and 307th Artillery Regiments would receive the Order of the Red Banner for breaking through the German defenses north of Warsaw.

=== East Prussian Offensive ===
On January 23 elements of the Army captured the important center of Willenberg, but spent the next three days fighting off repeated counterattacks. Following this, the advance continued on Guttstadt, while other elements of the Front reached the Baltic and cut off the German forces in East Prussia. In February, 3rd Army was reassigned to 3rd Belorussian Front. On February 19 the division as a whole would be awarded the Order of Suvorov, 2nd Degree, for its part in the invasion of the southern regions of East Prussia. The 160th Antitank Battalion would receive the Order of Alexander Nevsky on April 5 for its participation in fighting around Wormditt and Melzak, and on April 26 the 434th Regiment was given the Order of Kutuzov, 3rd Degree, for its role in battles near Braunsberg. On the same date the division as a whole received the same order in the 2nd Degree for its success in the Heiligenbeil Pocket campaign.

== Berlin Campaign ==
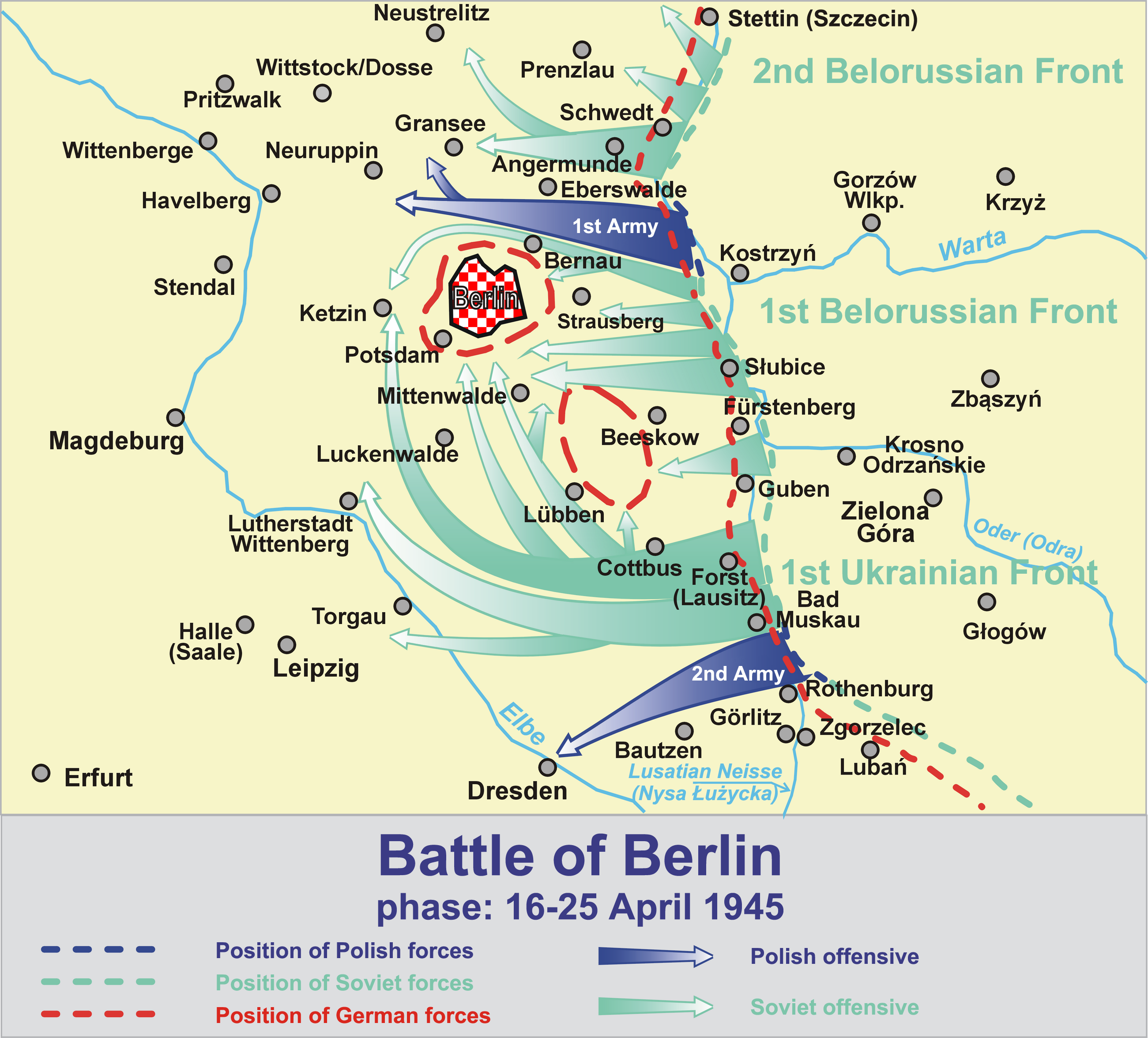
Battle of Berlin April 16-25. Note position of encircled 9th Army.

In April, 3rd Army was once again reassigned, this time to back to 1st Belorussian Front, in preparation for the assault on the German capital. 3rd Army, just arriving from East Prussia, was in the Front's second echelon, concentrated in the area Trebow–Polenzig–Sternberg. By April 25 a large grouping of German forces under command of 9th Army had been encircled southeast of Berlin jointly by 1st Belorussian and 1st Ukrainian Fronts and the 3rd Army was committed to the operation to complete the destruction of this pocket. 40th Corps received orders to attack from the Schulzendorf area in the direction of Mittenwalde with the objective of reaching the line from Wasmansdorf to Mittenwalde to Potz, in order to establish contact with 1st Ukrainian Front.

On April 28 the commander of 9th Army ordered a further breakout attempt from the Wendish-Buchholz–Halbe area to the west. This sector was occupied by 40th Corps and by 21st Rifle Corps of 3rd Guards Army and they were soon engaged in heavy fighting with up to a division of infantry supported by 18-20 tanks. During the day the Soviet forces beat off 12 German attacks and held their positions. As the size of the pocket contracted during the day it was clear that 9th Army was facing final defeat and a new attack began at 0100 hours on April 29 with up to 10,000 infantry and 35-40 tanks. By dawn this grouping had forced an opening between the two Corps to reach the Staatsforst Stachow woods and cut the highway 3km southeast of Tornow. However this breakout was halted by elements of 28th Army's 3rd Guards Rifle Corps. By the end of the month the pocket had been eliminated, with roughly two-thirds of its original strength either killed or captured.

== Postwar ==
When the fighting ended the men and women of the division shared the full title 169th Rifle, Rogachev, Order of the Red Banner, Order of Suvorov and Kutuzov Division. (Russian: 169-я стрелковая Рогачёвская Краснознамённая орденов Суворова и Кутузова дивизия.) In a final round of decorations in June 11 the 434th Regiment was awarded the Order of Suvorov, 3rd Degree, while the 680th Regiment received the Order of Kutuzov, 3rd Degree, both for their parts in the fighting against the encircled 9th Army.

According to STAVKA Order No. 11095 of May 29, 1945, part 6, the 169th is listed as one of the rifle divisions to be "disbanded in place". However, this was not carried out, and by the end of August the division had been relocated to Vitebsk. According to Vitaly Feskov and his research team, even further after the war it was moved to Lyepyel, still with the 40th Rifle Corps. The division was disbanded there in June 1946.
