= Alexander Edler von Daniels =

German general

- Born: 17 March 1891; Trier
- Died: 6 January 1960 (aged 68); Bielefeld
- Military career
- Allegiance: German Empire; Weimar Republic; Nazi Germany
- Service years: 1910–1945
- Rank: Generalleutnant
- Commands: 376. Infanterie-Division
- Conflicts: World War I World War II
- Awards: Knight's Cross of the Iron Cross

Alexander Edler von Daniels (17 March 1891 – 6 January 1960) was a German general in the Wehrmacht during World War II who fought in the Battle of Stalingrad.

Daniels commanded the 376th Infantry Division at Stalingrad, which was part of XI Corps of the German Sixth Army. In late December 1942, after Operation Uranus encircled the Sixth Army, Daniels was promoted to Generalleutnant and awarded the Knight's Cross of the Iron Cross. Daniels surrendered himself and his division to Col. Ivan Konstantinovich Morozov, commander of the 422nd Rifle Division, and was marched into captivity by the Red Army on 29 January 1943, where he was interrogated by Captain Nikolay Dyatlenko.

== Awards and decorations ==
- Knight's Cross of the Iron Cross on 18 December 1942 as Generalmajor and commander of 376. Infanterie-Division
