= Hans Kissel =

WW2 German Army general (1897-1975)

- Born: 19 February 1897; Mannheim, German Empire
- Died: 30 November 1975 (aged 78); Aglasterhausen, West Germany
- Military career
- Allegiance: German Empire (to 1918); Weimar Republic (to 1919); Nazi Germany
- Branch: Army
- Service years: 1915–1919; 1935–1945
- Rank: Generalmajor
- Commands: Chief of the Operations-Staff of the Volkssturm
- Conflicts: World War I: World War II; Battle of France; Operation Barbarossa; Battle of Uman; Battle of Kiev (1941); First Battle of Kharkov; Battle of the Caucasus; Lower Dnieper Offensive; Dnieper–Carpathian Offensive; First Jassy-Kishinev Offensive; Jassy–Kishinev Offensive (August 1944)
- Awards: Knight's Cross of the Iron Cross

Hans Kissel (19 February 1897 – 30 November 1975) was a highly decorated Generalmajor in the Wehrmacht during World War II. He was also a recipient of the Knight's Cross of the Iron Cross.

== Awards and decorations ==
- Iron Cross (1914)
  - 2nd Class
  - 1st Class
- Honour Cross of the World War 1914/1918
- Iron Cross (1939)
  - 2nd Class
  - 1st Class
- Wound Badge (1939)
  - in Black or Silver
- Eastern Front Medal
- German Cross in Gold (18 June 1942)
- Knight's Cross of the Iron Cross on 17 March 1944 as Oberst and commander of Grenadier-Regiment 683
