= Lermontovka =

Lermontovka Лермонтовка
- Selo
- Location within Amur Oblast Location within Russia
- Coordinates: 50°05′N 127°51′E
- Country: Russia
- Region: Amur Oblast
- District: Tambovsky District
- Time zone: UTC+9:00

Lermontovka (Russian: Лермонтовка) is a rural locality (a selo) and the administrative center of Lermontovsky Selsoviet of Tambovsky District, Amur Oblast, Russia. The population was 737 as of 2018. There are 11 streets.

== Geography ==
Lermontovka is located 17 km west of Tambovka (the district's administrative centre) by road. Tambovka is the nearest rural locality.
