= 376th Infantry Division =

- German: 376. Infanterie-Division
- Division insignia
- Active: 21 March 1942–late January 1943; 17 February 1943–August 1944
- Country: Nazi Germany
- Branch: Army
- Type: Infantry
- Size: Division
- Garrison/HQ: Kempten
- Engagements: World War II: Battle of Stalingrad; Battle of the Dnieper; Second Jassy–Kishinev Offensive

The 376th Infantry Division (German: 376. Infanterie-Division) was an infantry division of the German Army during World War II, active from 1942 to 1944 in two separate instances.

The division was first formed in March 1942 in France and was sent to the Eastern Front, where it surrendered near the end of the Battle of Stalingrad. Reformed in the Netherlands in February 1943, the second 376th was also sent to the Eastern Front where it was destroyed in fighting in Romania in August 1944.

== Operational history ==
The 376th Infantry Division, part of the nineteenth wave of infantry divisions formed during the war, was formed near Angoulême in southwestern France on 21 March 1942 under the command of Generalleutnant (Note: In the Wehrmacht, the rank of generalleutnant is equivalent to that of major general in the United States Army.) Alexander Edler von Daniels. The division nominally fell within the responsibility of Wehrkreis VII (military district VII) and had a home station at Kempten. It included three infantry regiments: the 672nd, 673rd, and 767th, drawn respectively from the 337th, 335th, and 327th Infantry Divisions of Army Group D. Its artillery regiment, the 376th, included four battalions, at least one from each of the latter divisions.

The division was sent to the Eastern Front and assigned to the 6th Army in June. The division fought in Case Blue near Kharkov, in the Don bend, and in Stalingrad, first as part of VIII Army Corps in July and August and then with XI Army Corps between September and November. Following the encirclement of 6th Army in the Stalingrad pocket during Operation Uranus, the 376th was transferred to XIV Army Corps in December and back to VIII Corps in January 1943. Daniels surrendered the division without authorization from army headquarters in late January, though remnants fought on as part of IV Army Corps until the final surrender of the army on 2 February. Most of its men died either in Stalingrad or as prisoners of war.

The division began reforming in the Netherlands by an order of 17 February under the command of Oberst Hans Kissel, initially as a kampfgruppe with the strength of a reinforced grenadier regiment on 23 March. It was formed from convalescents and recruits, and partially from veterans of the mountain divisions that had fought in Lapland. Between 1 April and 20 June, it was expanded to division strength. Generalleutnant Arnold Szelinski assumed command on 1 April when its expansion began. The 376th was assigned to LXXXIII Army Corps of Army Group D in April and May, and directly subordinate to the army group from June to October.

The division was sent to the Eastern Front in November as part of XI Army Corps in the 8th Army. It included an artillery regiment of three battalions armed with captured Soviet guns. It fought at Kirovograd during the final stages of the Battle of the Dnieper before being transferred to XXXXVII Panzer Corps in January 1944. The division suffered heavy losses, resulting in the disbandment of the 767th Grenadier Regiment while the remaining Grenadier regiments had been reduced to two battalions each. Among its casualties was Szelinski, who was killed in action at Kremenchug on 9 December; he was replaced by Oberst Otto Schwarz, subsequently promoted to Generalmajor (Note: The rank of generalmajor is equivalent to that of brigadier general in the United States Army.) and Generalleutnant, on 11 December. The 376th was reinforced by the remnants of the 167th Infantry Division with the 315th and 331st Regimental Groups, Division Group 167, on 15 January 1944. It subsequently fought at Dubăsari on the Dniester during the Dnieper–Carpathian Offensive.

A kampfgruppe from the division joined IV Corps by April, followed by the rest of the division in May; the 376th was part of the corps for the rest of its existence. Division Group 167 became the 315th Grenadier Regiment on 27 July. The division was destroyed during the Second Jassy–Kishinev Offensive in August after being encircled with IV Corps as the German troops withdrew from Romania. Among those captured was Schwarz, who spent the next decade as a prisoner of war. Soldiers of the division who had been on leave or in hospital at the time joined the 15th and 76th Infantry Divisions; the division was officially disbanded on 9 October.

== Commanders ==
The following officers commanded the division:

- Generalleutnant Alexander Edler von Daniels (March 1942–January 1943)
- Oberst Hans Kissel (17 February 1943)
- Generalleutnant Arnold Szelinski (1 April 1943)
- Oberst Otto Schwarz (promoted Generalmajor 1 February 1944, and Generalleutnant 1 August; 11 December 1943)

== See also ==
- List of German divisions in World War II

== Notes ==
Footnotes

Citations
