= Lake Sarpa =

Lake in Volgograd Oblast, Russia

Sarpa Lake
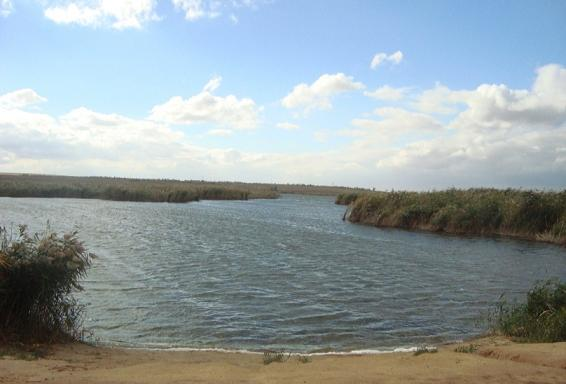
- Sarpa Lake

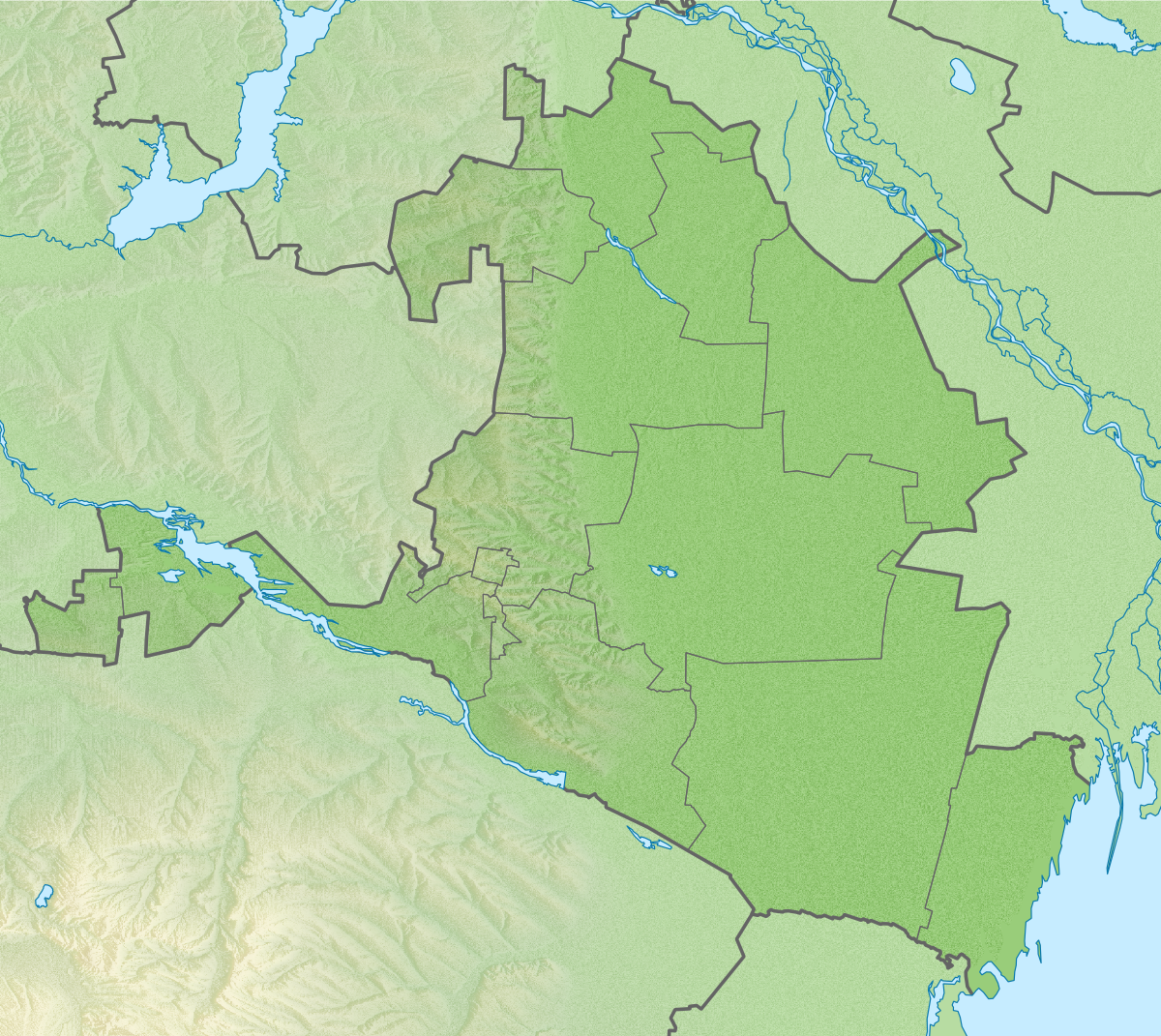
- Location within Kalmykia
- Location: Kalmykia, Volgograd Oblast
- Coordinates: 48°21′28″N 44°37′45″E
- Basin countries: Russia
- Surface area: 42.6 km^{2} (16.4 sq mi)

Sarpa Lake (Russian: Сарпа́) is a lake in Kalmykia, in the south-west region of Russia's Volgograd Oblast. It covers an area of 42.6 square kilometres.
