= Operation Koltso =

Operation in World War II

Operation Ring
- Part of the Battle of Stalingrad during the Eastern Front of World War II
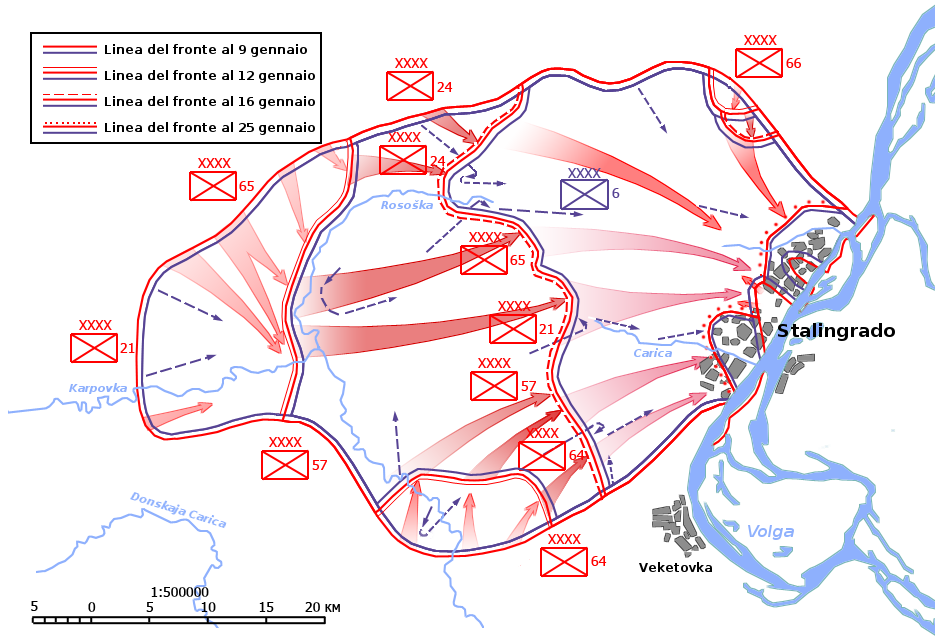
Date	10 January – 2 February 1943
Location	Stalingrad
Result	Soviet victory

Belligerents
Soviet Union	Germany; Romania

Commanders and leaders
(Soviet Union) Konstantin Rokossovsky	(Nazi Germany) Friedrich Paulus (surrendered) (Nazi Germany) Hans von Arenstof (surrendered) (Nazi Germany) Heinrich Deboi (surrendered)

Strength
212,000 troops 6,860 guns and mortars 257 tanks 300 aircraft 281,158 soldiers (Glantz)	250,000 soldiers 4,130 guns and mortars 300 tanks 100 aircraft 212,000 soldiers (Glantz)

Casualties and losses
48,000 (12,000 KIA, MIA)	250,000; ~100,000 KIA, MIA 107,800 captured 6,000 evacuated

Operation Koltso (Operation Ring) was the last part of the Battle of Stalingrad. It resulted in the capitulation of the remaining Axis forces encircled in the city. The operation was likely the largest-scale economy-of-force offensive ever conducted in military history.

== Initial attack ==
The operation was launched on 10 January 1943 with a mass artillery bombardment of the German positions outside the city, with 7,000 field guns, launchers and mortars, by the seven encircling Soviet armies. It was the single largest bombardment of the war at that point. In one section, Nikolay Voronov, commander-in-chief of the Red Army's artillery, had 500 guns/howitzers and 450 multiple rocket launchers across a 12 km wide attack sector, the highest Soviet artillery density yet achieved in the war.

On 10 January, it became clear the main goal was the Pitomnik airfield, which was captured on 16 January. "The 44th, 76th and 29th (Motorised) Infantry Divisions were badly hit." The 3rd (Motorised) Infantry Division, deployed on the southwestern corner of the cauldron since the end of November 1942, was ordered to retreat to new defensive positions to avoid encirclement. In the first three days, the Soviets lost 26,000 men and over half their tanks. The western half of the Stalingrad pocket had been lost by 17 January. The fighting then paused for four days while the Soviet forces regrouped and redeployed for the next phase of the operation.

Understanding the desperate nature of the struggle, on 19 January, German Field Marshal Friedrich Paulus requested permission from OKH to lead a breakout to the South:

The Fortress can only be held for a few days longer [...] The heroism of the soldiers is still unbroken. In order to exploit this to the last beat, on the verge of collapse I intend to command all of the units to make an organised breakthrough to the South. Individual groups will get through and at least create confusion in the Russian front, whereas while staying where they are all will certainly perish and as prisoners will die of hunger and freeze to death.

OKH responded that "[t]he Fuhrer has reserved the final decision [about the breakout] for himself". The second phase of the offensive began on 20 January with a Soviet push toward the airfield at Gumrak. Two days later, the airfield was occupied by the Soviets. Its capture meant an end to the evacuation of the German wounded and that any further air supply would have to be by parachute.

Paulus on 22 January sent a radio message to OKH:

Russians in action in 6 km wide on both sides Voroponovo, some with flags unfurled to the east. No way to close the gap. Withdrawal to neighboring fronts who are also without ammunition, useless and not feasible. Supply with ammunition from other fronts also no longer possible. Food at an end. More than 12,000 unprovided for wounded in the encirclement. What orders shall I give the troops who have no more ammunition and will be further attacked with heavy artillery, tanks and massed infantry? Fastest decision necessary because dissolution in some places already started. Confidence in the leadership still exists.

== German retreat ==
The Axis retreated back into the city itself. Resistance to the Soviet advance gradually diminished due to the exhaustion of all supplies on the Axis side. On 25 January, LI Corps commander Walther von Seydlitz-Kurzbach told his divisional commanders to decide for themselves on the matter of surrender. He was immediately relieved of his command by Paulus. Seydlitz-Kurzbach later fled the German lines under German fire and personally surrendered to the Soviets.

On 26 January, detachments of 21st Army met up with the 13th Guards Division to the north of the Mamaev Kurgan, which cut the Axis pocket in Stalingrad in two. Paulus and many of his senior German commanders were in the smaller southern pocket based in the city center of Stalingrad. The northern pocket was led by XI Corps commander General Karl Strecker and centered in the area around the tractor factory.

In bitter fighting, the Soviets gradually cleared the city center. By 31 January, German resistance in the southern pocket was confined to individual buildings. Soviet forces reached Paulus's headquarters in the Univermag Department Store and the remaining German soldiers ceased their resistance. Soviet Staff officers entered the building and negotiated terms with General Schmidt. Paulus refused to participate directly. In Soviet captivity, Paulus denied having surrendered, claiming to have been taken by surprise. He refused to issue an order to the remaining Germans in the southern pocket to surrender. He also denied having the authority to issue an order for the northern pocket to surrender.

== Axis defeat ==
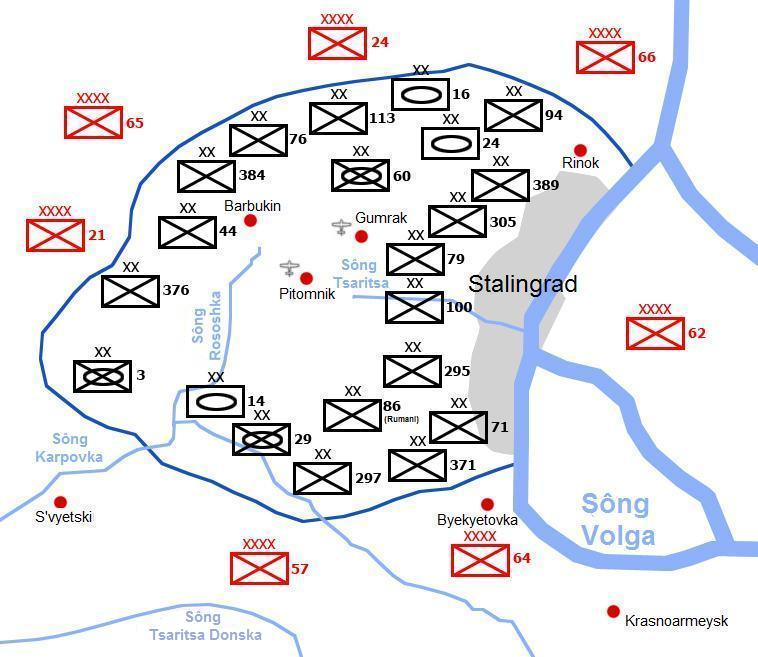
Disposition of forces in and around Stalingrad

The entire Soviet force at Stalingrad now concentrated on the northern pocket. Intense artillery fire was used to reduce resistance. Soviet forces then followed up, destroying any remaining bunkers, often with direct fire at short range from tanks or artillery.

By the early morning of 2 February, Strecker was informed that one of his officers had gone to negotiate surrender terms with the Soviets. He then decided to put an end to the fighting. At 07:00 Strecker sent a radio message to subordinate units: "All fighting will cease; weapons will be destroyed; expect the Russians in about an hour". A final message was transmitted to Army Group Don at 08:00: "The XI Army Corps, consisting of 6 divisions, has fulfilled its duty by the heaviest fighting to the very last. Hail to the Fuhrer! Hail to Germany!". With a further incomplete message being picked up at 09:20: "The Russians are penetrating ... fighting ... Tractor Works ..." After which no more messages were sent. Organized Axis resistance in the city then ended.
