= 64th Army (Soviet Union) =

- 64-я армия
- Active: 10 Jul 1942 – 16 Apr 1943
- Country: Soviet Union
- Branch: Red Army
- Type: Combined arms
- Size: Field army
- Part of: Stalingrad Front
- Engagements: World War II: Battle of Stalingrad

Commanders
- Notable commanders: Vasily Chuikov; Mikhail Shumilov

The 64th Army (Russian: 64-я армия) was a field army established by the Soviet Union's Red Army during the Second World War.

== History ==
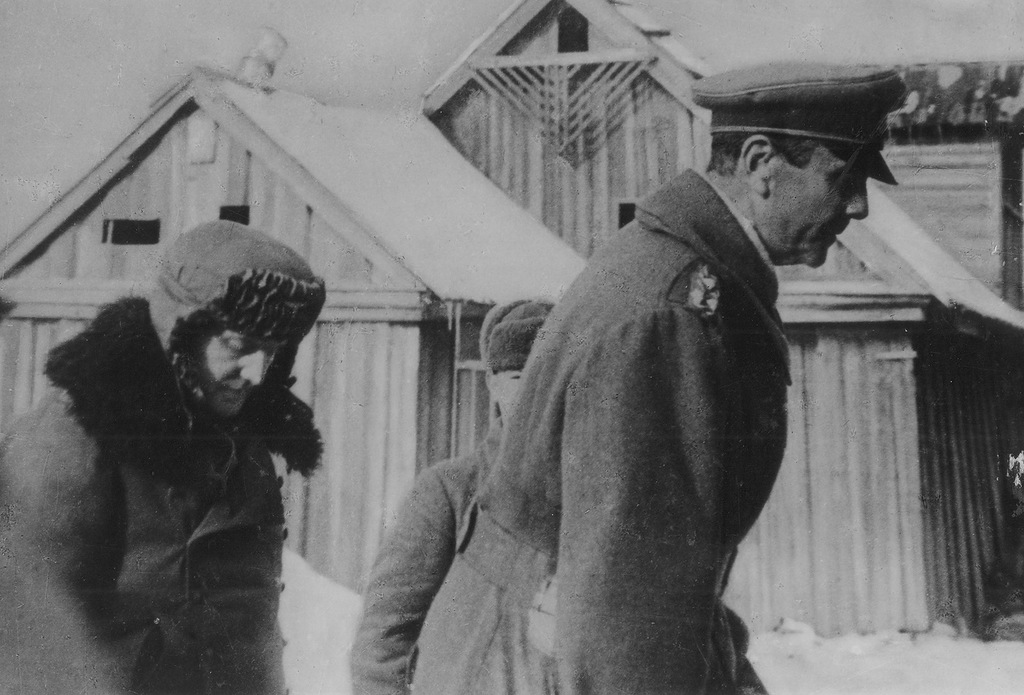
Generalfeldmarschall Friedrich Paulus and his adjutant (Oberst Wilhelm Adam) are escorted as prisoners to the headquarters of the 64th Army. Beketovka (350 km southeast of Stalingrad), January 31, 1943.

The Army was formed in April 1942 as the 1st Reserve Army (First Formation), a part of the Reserve of the Supreme High Command. The formation was then re-designated as the 64th Army three months later in July 1942.

After its creation, the 64th Army was included in the newly formed Stalingrad Front. With the beginning of the Stalingrad Strategic Defensive Operation, its advanced troops fought hard battles with the vanguards of the 6th German Army on the Tsimle River. The 64th Army repelled the offensive of the southern strike group of the enemy around Surovikino, Rychkovo and further on the left bank of the Don. In early August, due to the threat of the 4th Panzer Army breaking through to Stalingrad from the southwest, the army troops were moved there and continued to conduct defensive battles. Since August 7, the army was part of the Southeastern Front (since September 28 Stalingrad Front 2nd Formation). At the end of August it repelled the enemy's attacks on the middle area, and in early September it was assigned to the internal defensive area of Stalingrad and was stationed around Staro-Dubovka, Elhi and Ivanovka, where it fought hard battles until September 12.

Later it defended the southwestern outskirts and the southern part of Stalingrad. After the breakthrough of the defense of the South-Eastern Front at the junction of the 62nd and 64th armies and the withdrawal of its troops to the Volga in the area of Kuporosnoy, the main forces of the army defended the area south and southwest of Stalingrad, from where they systematically launched counterattacks on the flank of the enemy group who tried to take over the city.

During the transition to the counter-offensive, the army was a part of the main strike group of the Stalingrad front and subsequently fought in the enemy's encirclement. On January 1, 1943, as part of the Don Front, it participated in the liquidation of the encircled German troops in Stalingrad.

Since July 12, 1942 it was part of the Stalingrad Front and since January 1, 1943, of the Don Front. After the end of the Battle of Stalingrad, the 64th Army was from February 6, 1943 part of an Army group of troops under the command of Lieutenant General Kusma Trubnikov, which were held in reserve. Since the beginning of March 1943 it was part of the Voronezh Front and was engaged in defensive battles on the Donets River in the Belgorod region..

On April 16, 1943, the 64th Army was granted Guards status and transformed into the 7th Guards Army.

== Army composition ==
36th Guards Rifle Division,
29th Rifle Division,
38th Rifle Division,
126th Rifle Division,
138th Rifle Division,
157th Rifle Division,
169th Rifle Division,
399th Rifle Division,
66th Marine Rifle Brigade,
157th Marine Rifle Brigade
Krasnodar Infantry School
118th fortified area
594th Cannon Artillery Regiment
156th separate bridge-building battalion

== Commanders ==
- 10 July 1942 to 4 August 1942: Lieutenant General Vasily Chuikov
- 4 August 1942 to 17 April 1943: Lieutenant General Mikhail Shumilov

== Sources ==
- 64th Army in World War II on the website of the club "Memory" of Voronezh State University
- "People's Memory::Report on fighting 64 A. pamyat-naroda.ru". pamyat-naroda.ru.
- "Memory of the people:Stalingrad troop operation 7 GW. A. pamyat-naroda.ru".
