= Ivan Rubanyuk =

Soviet colonel general (1896–1959)

Ivan Andreyevich Rubanyuk
- Rubanyuk, 1944
- Born: 29 August 1896; Drahichyn District, Brest Region, Russian Empire
- Died: 3 October 1959 (aged 63); Moscow, Soviet Union
- Military career
- Allegiance: Russian Empire; Soviet Union
- Branch: Imperial Russian Army; Soviet Red Army
- Service years: 1915–1917 (Russian Empire); 1918–1937, 1940–1959 (Soviet Union)
- Rank: Colonel general
- Commands: 11th Rifle Corps; 10th Guards Rifle Corps; 14th Army; 25th Army
- Conflicts: World War I Russian Civil War; World War II

Ivan Andreyevich Rubanyuk (Russian: Иван Андреевич Рубанюк; 29 August 1896 – 3 October 1959) was a Soviet colonel general who rose to field army command during the Cold War.

== World War I and Russian Civil War ==
Ivan Andreyevich Rubanyuk was born on 29 August 1896 in the village of Ognarovo, Antopolsky volost, Kobrinsky Uyezd, Grodno Governorate. His ethnicity was listed in documents during his early service period as Lithuanian, but in later documents changed to Ukrainian. During World War I, he entered the Imperial Russian Army as a one-year volunteer on 15 May 1915 and was sent to the Life Guards Jager Regiment. He graduated from the training detachment of the regiment in 1916 and served as a regimental clark with the rank of yefreytor and junior unter-ofitser. With the regiment, he fought on the Southwestern Front, participating in the Brusilov offensive. After demobilization in December 1917 he went to Kaluga, where he worked in the militsiya of the Kaluga Uyezd Rationing Committee.

During the Russian Civil War, Rubanyuk was conscripted into the Red Army on 20 July 1918 and sent to the newly formed 21st Rifle Regiment of the 1st Kaluga Brigade. Here he continued his service as a platoon commander and assistant regimental adjutant. In the latter he fought on the Southern Front against the Armed Forces of South Russia between April and November 1919. From April 1920 he served as an assistant company commander in the 1st Separate Battalion of the Kharkov Military District, and from October of that year was adjutant of the 3rd Ukrainian Reserve Regiment in the cities of Kharkov and Sumy. After the disbandment of the regiment in February 1921 he was transferred to the ChON, then served as adjutant in the 2nd Kharkov Territorial Regiment and the 8th Special Purpose Regiment. From October 1921 he commanded a company in the 4th Special Purpose Regiment, in which he fought in battles against the anti-Soviet forces of Popov in the area of Belopolye.

== Interwar period ==
From February 1922 Rubanyuk served as adjutant of the 7th Regiment of the VChK, and from June as acting head clerk of the operational section of a separate special purpose company. From January 1923 he commanded the Separate Kupyansk Special Purposes Company in the Kharkov Military District. From May he served as assistant chief of staff of the ChON in Kharkov Governorate, and from December as assistant commander of a separate ChON battalion. From April to June 1924 he completed the courses for senior and higher command personnel in Kharkov. After graduation he was appointed assistant battalion commander in the 296th Rifle Regiment of the 99th Rifle Division at Cherkassy, and from August served as assistant head of the 1st section of the division staff. In June 1925 he transferred to the 100th Rifle Division at Belaya Tserkov, serving as a senior assistant chief of the 1st section of the division staff. From October 1927 to June 1928 he completed the commanders' advanced training course in Moscow.

From May to October 1929 he commanded a battalion of the 299th Rifle Regiment, then returned to his former position in the division staff, and from May to December 1931 temporarily served as division chief of staff. From 11 June 1934 he commanded the 7th Rifle Regiment of the 3rd Rifle Division. During the Great Purge, in May 1937 then-Major Rubanyuk was arrested, removed from the Red Army on 31 May 1937 and until 16 July 1940 under "investigation" by the NKVD. After being freed he was restored to the Red Army, being assigned as a commander of a cadet battalion at the Odessa Infantry School in October.

== World War II ==
From the beginning of Operation Barbarossa Rubanyuk was sent to the front in June and appointed commander of the 134th Army Reserve Rifle Regiment of the 9th Army at Pervomaysk. He commanded this regiment until October 1941, then was appointed commander of the 591st Rifle Regiment of the 176th Rifle Division of the Southern Front. The regiment saw its first action in fighting for the station of Debaltsevo, then fought as part of the 12th Army in the operational group of General F.V. Kamkov. Rubanyuk led the regiment through the winter in the Donbass defensive and the Rostov defensive and offensive operations.

In February 1942 Lieutenant Colonel Rubanyuk was appointed deputy division commander of the 176th, and took command of the division on 19 July. As division commander, with the 12th Army, he led it in the battles for Voroshilovsk, Voroshilovgrad, and others, and the retreat to the Don. Subsequently the division conducted battles for Bataysk, Budyonnovsk, on the Manych and Mineralnye Vody. Then, entering the 37th Army of the Transcaucasian Front, the division concentrated in the Mozdok region, where it repulsed German attempts to break through the main ridge of the Caucasus. For active participation in the Mozdok-Malgobek and Nalchik-Ordzhonikidze defensive operations the division was awarded the Order of the Red Banner.

Rubanyuk was promoted to command the 11th Rifle Corps on 13 October and received the rank of major general on 10 November. He led it in the North Caucasus Offensive, then from 11 February 1943 commanded the 10th Guards Rifle Corps, then part of the 56th Army of the Transcaucasian Front. During 1943 the corps was part of the 18th, 56th, 44th, and 28th Armies of the North Caucasus, Southern, 4th, 3rd, and 2nd Ukrainian Fronts. In March and April 1944 its units as part of the 5th Shock Army of the 3rd Ukrainian Front participated in the Odessa Offensive and the liberation of Odessa. Then as part of the 46th Army the corps participated in the Budapest, Vienna and Prague Offensives.

== Postwar ==
After the end of the war Rubanyuk continued to command the corps in the Southern Group of Forces, then in the Odessa Military District. From March 1947 to June 1948 he completed the Higher Academic Course at the Voroshilov Higher Military Academy, then commanded the 20th Guards Rifle Corps of the Kiev Military District. From April 1952 he commanded the 14th Army, and then the 25th Army from May 1953, in the Far Eastern Military District. Rubanyuk was dispatched to China in December 1957 as senior military advisor to the commander of a military district of the People's Liberation Army. From January 1959 he served as military specialist at a military district, was the senior advisor in the group of Soviet military advisors in the PRC. During this position, he died in Moscow on 3 October 1959. He was buried in the Novodevichy Cemetery.

He was promoted to colonel general on August 8, 1955. He was a recipient of the Order of Lenin (2), the Order of the Red Banner (3), the Order of Suvorov 2nd class and the Order of Kutuzov 2nd class. He died in Moscow.

Military offices
Preceded by Mikhail Shumilov	Commander of the 11th Rifle Corps; October 13, 1942 – February 11, 1943	Succeeded by Nikolay Yermilov
Preceded by Vasily Glagolev	Commander of the 10th Guards Rifle Corps; February 12, 1943 - April 1947	Succeeded by Semyon Kozak
Preceded by Georgy Latyshev	Commander of the 14th Army; April 14, 1952 – May 18, 1953	Succeeded by Army disbanded
Preceded by Vasily Shvetsov	Commander of the 25th Army; May 18, 1953 – December 30, 1957	Succeeded by Army disbanded
