= 11th Rifle Corps =

- Russian: 11-й стрелковый корпус
- Active: 1st formation: November 1922 – August 1941; 2nd formation: October 1942 – summer 1945
- Country: Soviet Union
- Branch: Red Army
- Engagements: Soviet invasion of Poland; Eastern Front (World War II); Operation Barbarossa

Commanders
- Notable commanders: Mikhail Shumilov

The 11th Rifle Corps (Russian: 11-й стрелковый корпус) was a corps of the Red Army, formed twice.

The 11th was first formed in 1922 in the Petrograd area but soon moved to the Belorussian Military District. After fighting in the Soviet invasion of Poland, the corps moved to Lithuania, where it was stationed when Operation Barbarossa, the German invasion of the Soviet Union, began on 22 June 1941. Suffering heavy losses, the corps retreated through Lithuania and Latvia to Estonia in the Baltic Strategic Defensive Operation. It defended positions in Estonia in July and early August during the Leningrad Strategic Defensive before being disbanded that month when the Red Army abolished rifle corps.

Reformed in October 1942 when the Red Army reestablished its rifle corps, the 11th fought in the Battle of the Caucasus for the next year. After the completion of the recapture of the North Caucasus, the corps fought in western Ukraine and the Carpathians. Ending the war in Czechoslovakia, it was disbanded in the summer of 1945.

== 1st formation ==
=== Interwar period ===
The 11th Rifle Corps was formed in accordance with orders of the Petrograd Military District of 25 and 26 November 1922, headquartered at Staraya Russa. A Latvian, Žanis Bļumbergs, commanded the corps from its formation to September 1926. In November 1923 it moved to Petrograd, and the district became the Leningrad Military District in early 1924. The 11th moved to Smolensk in October 1925, transferring to the Belorussian Military District. Mikhail Sangursky served as corps commander and commissar between March 1928 and 1929, when he was sent to courses at the Frunze Military Academy. Yepifan Kovtyukh (promoted to Komkor when personal ranks were introduced in 1935) served as corps commander and commissar from January 1930 to June 1936, when he became army inspector of the district. In August of that year, Komdiv Semyon Nikitin took command of the corps; he was arrested during the Great Purge in March 1938.

Colonel (promoted to Major General 4 June 1940) Mikhail Shumilov took command in April 1938. In September 1939, the corps fought in the Soviet invasion of Poland as part of the 10th Army. It included the 6th, 33rd, and the 121st Rifle Divisions at the beginning of the invasion on 17 September. By 2 October, these divisions had transferred to other units, and it included the 29th, 64th, and 145th Rifle Divisions instead. The corps headquarters relocated to Grodno in November and became part of the 11th Army. Between June and July 1940 it was briefly headquartered at Kovno before moving to Šiauliai in August, part of the Baltic Special Military District. The 11th transferred to the 8th Army in October, and included the 11th and 125th Rifle Divisions by the outbreak of the war. It defended a 40-kilometer sector on the left flank of the 8th Army, with its headquarters in the forests northwest of Skaudvilė. The 125th Rifle Division was in the corps' first echelon, holding covering the highway and railroad from Tilsit to Šiauliai. The 48th Rifle Division (part of the adjacent 10th Rifle Corps), after moving forward from Riga, was to take up positions on the left of the 125th. The corps' 73rd Corps Artillery Regiment included four battalions of 107 mm guns.

=== On the eve of Barbarossa ===
As a result of increased tensions with Germany, on 14 June 1941, the district command approved a plan for the redeployment of units closer to the border. Under the plan, the 48th Division was to concentrated in the Radviliškis area under the guise of exercises. The 11th Rifle Division was to transfer by rail from Narva in the Leningrad Military District, and the 73rd Corps Artillery Regiment was to move forward by rail. The redeployed units were to concentrate in their new positions by 23–24 June. As a result, when the war began, they were on the march or in railroad cars and thus were vulnerable to German bombing. On 15 June, an order was issued on increasing the district's combat readiness, which noted that the 125th Rifle Division had revealed serious shortcomings in tactical exercises, as unit commanders did not fully study their sectors. As a result, the district training schedule was increased, but the deadlines for the scheduled exercises were often in late June or early July.

On the morning of 21 June, the 11th Rifle Division began to concentrate in the Šeduva area, joining the corps. By the end of 21 June, only the 125th Rifle Division had moved forward to positions on the border, and the forward movement of the 73rd Regiment was delayed. Shumilov later recalled that soldiers in advanced units were issued cartridges on 20 June, but that a member of the district military council demanded that they be withheld.

=== Border battles ===
On 22 June 1941, Operation Barbarossa, the German invasion of the Soviet Union, began. The corps, as part of the 8th Army (now part of the Northwestern Front), was involved in fierce fighting in Latvia against the German advance, known as the Border Battles in Soviet historiography. Particularly heavy fighting took place in the 125th Division's sector against the 4th Panzer Group's main assault. The division's position was made worse by its open left flank – the 48th had been caught by German bombers while marching from Riga and had lost 70% of its men to a tank attack near Eržvilkas, forcing its withdrawal to the Raseiniai area. From 07:00 on 22 June the 125th defended its sector and was pushed back 12 kilometers by the end of the day after German tanks crossed the Jūra River bridge. It retreated from Tauragė and withdrew into the forests between there and Skaudvilė, threatened with encirclement by German forces on two sides.

On the morning of 23 June, the 125th was again attacked by German troops. By the end of the day, it had lost more than 40% of its men. Between 23 and 25 June, the corps fought in a front counterattack against the 4th Panzer Group, delaying its advance in the Šiauliai area. At midday on 24 June, the 202nd Motorized Division was subordinated to the corps. On the evening of 24 June, the 8th Army began withdrawing, and after an orderly retreat, the corps held positions on the line of Kanalas and Radviliškis by the end of 26 June. The 11th Rifle Division, still part of the corps, covered the army's left flank. The seizure of Daugavpils by the LVI Motorized Corps forced a further retreat towards Riga to the northern bank of the Daugava, ordered on 27 June. The 11th Division was transferred to the army reserve by the same order. The 125th occupied defenses on the right bank of the river at Rembate and Koknese, while a regiment from the 202nd Division fought at Krustpils on 29 and 30 June.

Due to the unpreparedness of Riga for a sustained defense, the front commander ordered the army to begin a withdrawal to the line of Cēsis and Madona by the end of 1 July, and to Dzeni, Gulbene, and Lake Lubāns by the end of 2 July. The corps and the rest of the army began moving towards the Estonian border, but on the night of 1 July the army commander was ordered to stop the withdrawal and restore the Daugava line, due to Stavka's insistence on holding the latter. The corps was ordered to capture the area of Ogre at Koknese. As a result, on 2 July, the 8th Army was neither able to defend or advance, allowing the XXXXI Panzer Corps to advance northeast towards Ostrov through the junction between 8th and 27th Armies. By 4 July, between 180 and 250 men were left in each of the rifle regiments of the 125th Division.

=== Defense of Tallinn ===
As the German advance continued, the corps retreated into Estonia, fighting in what became known as the defense of Tallinn in the Leningrad Strategic Defensive. By the morning of 7 July, with the remnants of the 48th and 125th Rifle Divisions, and a battalion from the 11th, the corps was tasked with defending the northern bank of the Emajõgi from Võrtsjärv to Lake Peipus, and preventing a German breakthrough along the west coast of Lake Peipus towards Narva. Its left flank and rear were covered by the Chudskoye Military Flotilla, operationally subordinated to the corps. On 8 July, German troops attempted to cross the Emajõgi in the corps sector but were repulsed. The 125th held defenses along the river between Jõesuu and Veibri, while the 48th held positions from Veibri to Lake Peipus. The army became part of the Northern Front on 14 July. On 18 July, the 2nd Latvian Volunteer Regiment was attached to the corps; it was formed from Latvian Communists.

On 22 July, preceded by massive artillery and aerial bombardment, German troops launched an attack at the junction of the 10th and 11th Corps, attempting to split the army in half. The defenses on the 11th's right flank were broken, and by the end of 24 July, German units reached the Mustvee River in the corps' rear after advancing to the northeast. On 25 July German troops broke through to Lake Peipus in the Mustvee area. The 11th was unable to contain the advance of the fresh German 291st Infantry Division, and was cut off from the rest of the army. Shumilov was separated from his units and the corps headquarters did not know the locations of its division's command posts. As a result, on 28 July, the Chudskoye Military Flotilla was transferred to the operational subordination of the army commander. Retreating north, units of the corps reached the Omedu River on the night of 25 July but were attacked by the 254th Infantry Division on the next day. Until 24 July elements of the 125th Division held the left bank of Tartu. By the morning of 31 July, 3,000 men had escaped the pocket, but up to 7,000 men and the artillery of the two divisions remained behind. In a report to the headquarters of the front, the Military Council of the army stated that the 11th Corps "did not actually exist, as its units leaving the encirclement were extremely weakened and demoralized by the enemy air superiority".

On 6 August a German attack split the army into two parts again. The 11th, constituting the main part of the army's eastern group, defended positions from Lake Peipus to the Gulf of Finland, stubbornly resisting the German advance along the Narva highway. It now included the 118th and 268th Rifle Divisions as well. On 8 August, army commander Lieutenant General Pyotr Pshennikov ordered a counterattack, but the corps was instead forced onto the defensive when a German attack by the 291st and 93rd Infantry Divisions of the XXVI Army Corps was launched on the same day. The 118th Division, which had not yet completed its concentration, was forced to leave Jõhvi under the threat of encirclement and retreat along the railway to Narva, although the 268th was able to repulse the attack. This increased the gap between the 10th and 11th Corps to 80 kilometers. The corps continued to retreat and fought at the Narva Isthmus. Its headquarters was disbanded in August 1941 when the Red Army abolished the remaining rifle corps.

== 2nd formation ==
The corps was reformed in October 1942, part of the Transcaucasian Front's Northern Group of Forces. It was commanded by Colonel (promoted to Major General 10 November) Ivan Rubanyuk. During the Battle of the Caucasus, the 11th fought in the North Caucasus Offensive in early 1943, advancing about 600 kilometers and participating in the capture of Prokhladny, Georgiyevsk, and Mineralnye Vody. In February, Rubanyuk was transferred to command the 10th Guards Rifle Corps. Corps deputy commander Colonel Nikolay Yermilov briefly led it during the Krasnodar Offensive between 12 and 19 February. The corps was part of the North Caucasian Front's 9th Army during the operation.

Major General Ivan Zamertsev replaced Yermilov in late February. Successively part of the 9th, 18th, and 1st Guards Armies of the North Caucasian Front (the 3rd Ukrainian Front from 20 October), the corps fought in the Novorossiysk-Taman Operation, the Zhitomir–Berdichev Offensive, the Proskurov–Chernovitsy Offensive, and the Lvov–Sandomierz Offensive. In April 1944, elements of the corps advanced into the Carpathian Mountains and Romania. In August, during the Lvov–Sandomierz Offensive, Colonel Nikolay Gershevich replaced Zamertsev in command. At the time, the corps was part of the 18th Army.

Major General (promoted to Lieutenant General 20 April 1945) Mikhail Zaporozhchenko took command in late August. The 11th transferred to the 1st Guards Army and later the 38th Army. It fought in the Western Carpathian Offensive and the Prague Offensive in the final months of the war. It was disbanded in accordance with a Stavka order of 29 May 1945, which established the Northern Group of Forces. Its troops were used to reinforce units in the new group of forces.

== Organization ==
1939:

- 6th Rifle Division
- 33rd Rifle Division
- 121st Rifle Division

1941:

- 11th Rifle Division
- 125th Rifle Division

== Commanders ==
The following officers commanded the corps' first formation:

- Žanis Bļumbergs (October 1922 – September 1926)
- Mikhail Sangursky (March 1928 – 1929)
- Komkor (from 1935) Yepifan Kovtyukh (January 1930 – June 1936)
- Komdiv Semyon Nikitin (August 1936 – March 1938)
- Colonel (promoted to Major General 4 June 1940) Mikhail Shumilov (7 April 1938 – August 1941)

The following officers commanded the corps' second formation:

- Colonel (promoted to Major General 10 November 1942) Ivan Rubanyuk (13 October 1942 – 11 February 1943)
- Colonel Nikolay Yermilov (12–19 February 1943)
- Major General Ivan Zamertsev (22 February 1943 – 8 August 1944)
- Colonel Nikolay Gershevich (9–23 August 1944)
- Major General (promoted to Lieutenant General 20 April 1945) Mikhail Zaporozhchenko (24 August 1944 – after 11 May 1945)
