= 86th Guards Rifle Division =

- Active: 1943–1957
- Country: Soviet Union
- Branch: Red Army (1943-1946); Soviet Army (1946-1957)
- Type: Division
- Role: Infantry
- Engagements: Mius Offensive; Donbass Strategic Offensive (August 1943); Battle of the Dniepr; Odessa Offensive; First Jassy-Kishinev Offensive; Second Jassy-Kishinev Offensive; Budapest Offensive; Siege of Budapest; Operation Konrad; Operation Konrad III; Vienna Offensive
- Decorations: Order of the Red Banner
- Battle honours: Nikolaev

Commanders
- Notable commanders: Col. Ivan Fedotovich Seryogin; Maj. Gen. Vasilii Pavlovich Sokolovskii; Maj. Gen. Leonid Aleksandrovich Kolobov

The 86th Guards Rifle Division was reformed as an elite infantry division of the Red Army in April 1943, based on the 2nd formation of the 98th Rifle Division, and served in that role until after the end of the Great Patriotic War and well into the postwar era.

It first saw action in July 1943 as part of the 2nd formation of the 1st Guards Rifle Corps of 2nd Guards Army in Southern Front during the Mius Offensive, which proved a failure. A month later it helped break the Mius-Front and began advancing through the southern regions of eastern Ukraine. In February 1944 it was transferred to the 28th Army in 3rd Ukrainian Front and it would serve under this Front command for the duration of the war. After crossing the Dniepr River and while advancing on Nikolaev the 86th Guards became part of the 10th Guards Rifle Corps, and would remain under this command, with few exceptions, for the duration of the war and into the 1950s. The division earned an honorific for its part in the liberation of Nikolaev and within weeks was also decorated with the Order of the Red Banner for its role in the liberation of Odessa, now as part of 5th Shock Army. In the fighting along the Dniestr River in April this Army was quickly fought to a standstill and the division remained in this area until August when it was transferred to 46th Army; it would remain under this command for the duration. During the summer offensive that destroyed the German 6th Army for the second time the 10th Guards Corps was a reserve formation and played an important role in the exploitation of the victory into the Balkan states. During the autumn and winter the 86th Guards assisted in the offensives that gradually encircled Budapest, helping to beat off several German attempts to break through to rescue the garrison trapped there; each of its rifle regiments would be honored or decorated for their roles in this fighting. In the spring of 1945 it advanced into Austria and ended the war there. The division continued to serve as part of the 10th Guards Corps until 1957 when it was reformed as a motor rifle division.

== Formation ==
At the beginning of March 1943 the 98th Rifle Division was part of the 1st Guards Rifle Corps of 2nd Guards Army in Southern Front. On March 10 it was withdrawn to Sverdlovsk for rebuilding and while there on April 16 it was redesignated as the 86th Guards; it would receive its Guards banner on May 10. Once the division completed its reorganization its order of battle was as follows:

- 260th Guards Rifle Regiment (from 4th Rifle Regiment)
- 263rd Guards Rifle Regiment (from 166th Rifle Regiment)
- 265th Guards Rifle Regiment (from 308th Rifle Regiment)
- 191st Guards Artillery Regiment (from 153rd Artillery Regiment)
- 93rd Guards Antitank Battalion
- 89th Guards Reconnaissance Company
- 99th Guards Sapper Battalion
- 165th Guards Signal Battalion (later 119th Guards Signal Company)
- 91st Guards Medical/Sanitation Battalion
- 90th Guards Chemical Defense (Anti-gas) Company
- 92nd Guards Motor Transport Company
- 88th Guards Field Bakery
- 87th Guards Divisional Veterinary Hospital
- 1727th Field Postal Station
- 168th Field Office of the State Bank

Col. Ivan Fedotovich Seryogin, who had commanded the 98th since September 1942, remained in command until May 27. He was then replaced by Col. Vasilii Pavlovich Sokolovskii who would remain in command for the duration of the war, being promoted to the rank of major general on September 13, 1944. Through June and into July the division remained in 1st Guards Corps, which also the contained the 24th and 33rd Guards Rifle Divisions.

== Into Ukraine ==
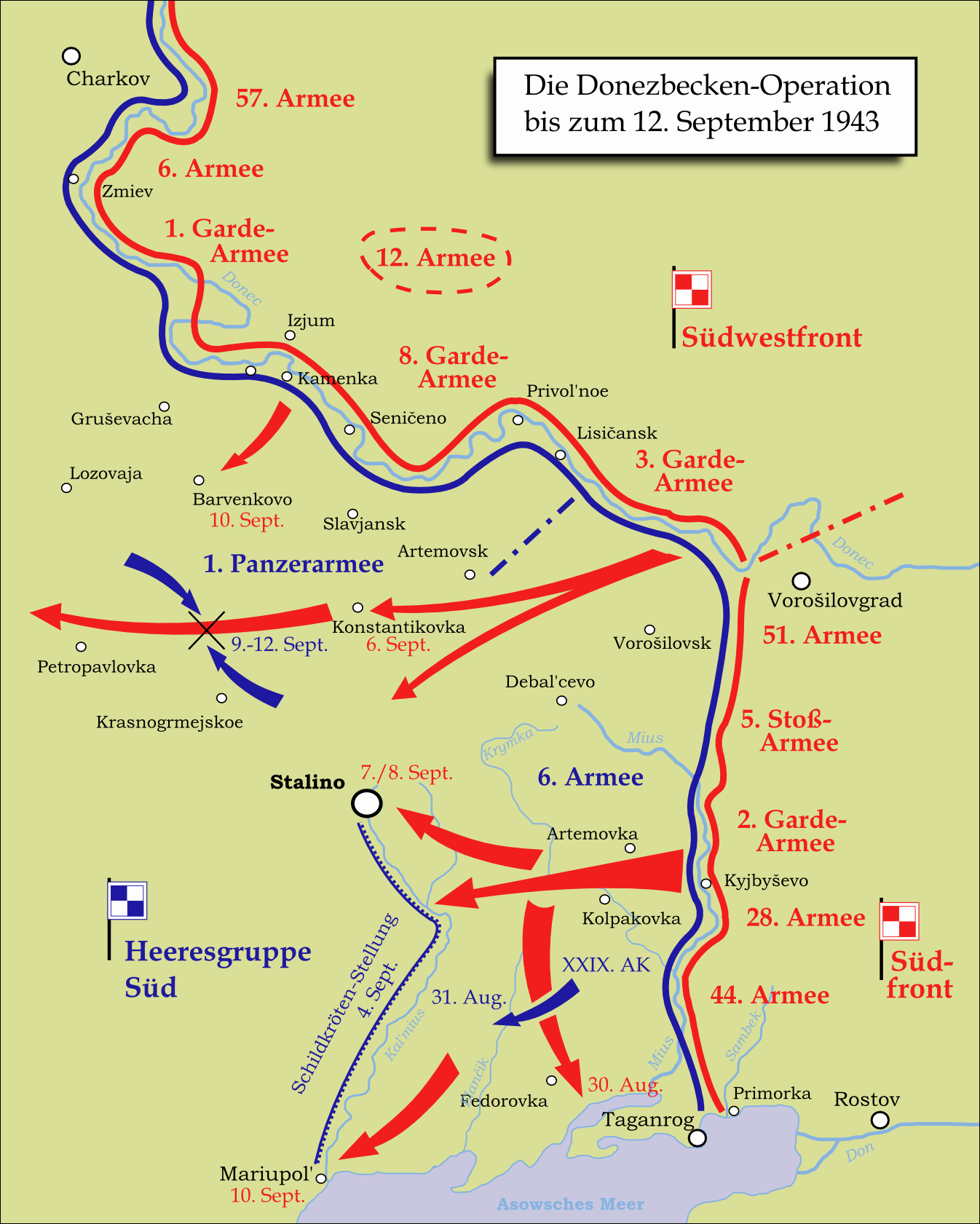
Donbass Offensive in August, 1943

The new commander of Southern Front, Col. Gen. F. I. Tolbukhin, was directed to plan a new offensive to breach the German front along the Mius River which was held by the rebuilt but chronically understrength 6th Army. Tolbukhin chose to break the German defenses facing the center of his line with the 5th Shock and 28th Armies operating on a 16km-wide sector with the 2nd Guards Army in second echelon ready to exploit any initial success. The offensive opened on July 17, within days of the suspension of the German offensive at Kursk. The 28th and 5th Shock forced the river but were soon met by German armor from the southern wing of Army Group South which first contained the bridgehead and at the end of the month launched a powerful counterblow with four panzer divisions, a panzergrenadier division and two infantry divisions. On the evening of August 1 Tolbukhin reported the situation to the STAVKA and received permission to withdraw his forces to their old positions. While he attributed much of the failure on his premature commitment of 2nd Guards Army he was reassured by Marshal A. M. Vasilevskii that the offensive had successfully diverted German strength from more important axes.

Southern Front returned to the offensive on August 18, this time finally smashing the Mius-Front with the fire of over 5,000 guns and mortars on the German defenses. By the end of the month Tolbukhin's armies had taken Taganrog and Hitler finally authorized 6th Army, "if necessary", to pull back to the Kalmius River. During September the 86th and 24th Guards Divisions were transferred to the 55th Rifle Corps, still in 2nd Guards Army. Through September and well into October Southern Front (as of October 20 4th Ukrainian Front) made slow progress against 6th Army from the Dniepr to the Sea of Azov with orders to destroy the German Melitopol grouping, seize crossings over the Dniepr and then shut the German 17th Army into the Crimea. The offensive made little progress until October 9 but by October 23, led by forces of the 51st Army, the Front finally ground its way into the city. During the month both the 86th and 24th Guards returned to 1st Guards Corps. In the first days of November the 51st and 28th Armies attempted to seize the Crimea from off the march but were narrowly unsuccessful. This left the former containing 17th Army in the peninsula while by the start of January 1944 the 2nd Guards Army had advanced to the mouth of the Dniepr at Kherson. In February the 86th Guards was transferred to the 28th Army as a separate division; this Army was now part of the 3rd Ukrainian Front.

=== Into Western Ukraine ===
During the first days of February the German 6th Army began evacuating the bridgehead it held on the east bank of the Dniepr based on Nikopol. 28th Army had been facing the southern flank of this bridgehead near Bolshaya Lepatikha. The last German troops crossed the Dniepr on February 7 with the goal of forming a new line behind the Ingulets River. Due in part to an unusually mild winter the pace of operations on both sides remained slow through the rest of the month.

The Front commander, Army Gen. R. Ya. Malinovskii, began a new offensive on March 4 with the objectives of crossing the Bug and Dniestr rivers prior to forcing the border into Romania. The center of 6th Army was struck by the 4th Guards Mechanized Corps and the 8th Guards Army, which made slow initial progress before breaking into the clear on March 7, advancing 40km and liberating Novy Bug. Malinovskii now faced the choice of striking due south toward Nikolaev or to drive west to get over the Bug behind 6th Army. Attempting to do both he gave the German forces an opportunity to escape. Despite this miscalculation Nikolaev was liberated and the division, which was now part of 10th Guards Rifle Corps in 28th Army, earned an honorific:

NIKOLAEV (Nikolaev Oblast)... 86th Guards Rifle Division (Col. Sokolovskii, Vasilii Pavlovich)... The troops who participated in the liberation of Nikolaev, by the order of the Supreme High Command of March 28, 1944, and a commendation in Moscow, are given a salute of 20 artillery salvoes from 224 guns.

Within days the division was transferred again, along with 10th Guards Corps, to 5th Shock Army; the Corps also contained the 109th Guards and the 320th Rifle Division.

=== Odessa Offensive ===
Immediately following the victory at Nikolaev the left (south) wing of 3rd Ukrainian Front continued its advance on the city of Odessa, which was expected to be taken at the earliest around April 5. This was led by Pliyev's Cavalry-Mechanized Group, followed by the 8th Guards and 6th Armies to envelop the city from the northwest and west while the 5th Shock was to advance on its defenses directly from the east.

On April 4 Pliyev's Group and the lead elements of 37th Army signalled the beginning of the final phase of the Odessa offensive by capturing the town of Razdelnaia, 60km northwest of the city, thus once again splitting German 6th Army into two distinct parts. Once this was accomplished Malinovskii ordered Pliyev to race south as fast as possible to cut the withdrawal routes of the German forces from the Odessa region. At the same time the three combined-arms armies were to move in to take the city. After heavy fighting on its northern and eastern approaches the forward detachments of 5th Shock entered its northern suburbs on the evening of April 9. Overnight the remaining Soviet forces approached Odessa's inner defenses from the northwest and west. With the trap closing shut the remainder of the defending LXXII Army Corps began breaking out to the west, allowing the Soviet forces to occupy the city's center at 1000 hours on April 10 after only minor fighting. For its part in the liberation of Odessa, on April 20 the 86th Guards would be awarded the Order of the Red Banner.

=== First Jassy-Kishinev Offensive ===
Following the battle for Odessa, the STAVKA ordered Malinovskii's Front to mount a concerted effort to force the Dniestr, capture Chișinău, and eventually occupy all of eastern Bessarabia. 5th Shock and 6th Armies were engaged in mopping up Odessa and were unable to join the pursuit for at least a week, when they were to reinforce the forward armies wherever required. The initial efforts to force the river were only partially successful, with a series of small and tenuous bridgeheads being seized. On the night of April 12/13 it was decided to reinforce 8th Guards Army with part of the 5th Shock's forces, but this would not take place until April 18-20 due to the state of the roads. The Army was expected to be required to overcome German strongpoints at Cioburciu and Talmaza before advancing westward.

By April 19 the 10th Guards Corps had reached the Dniestr in the Cioburciu area but Malinovskii delayed the 5th Shock and 6th Armies' main offensives until the 25th largely due to the failures of the 5th Guards and 57th Armies' crossings near Tașlîc and the difficulty of ammunition supply. When the preliminary assault finally began it was in cooperation with 46th Army in and around Cioburciu. 5th Shock's commander, Col. Gen. V. D. Tsvetayev, arrayed his two rifle corps in a single echelon; 37th Rifle Corps was to attack on the right wing while the 10th Guards Corps attacked on the left on a 5km-wide sector from Talmaza southward to just north of Cioburciu with the 86th and 109th Guards in first echelon and the 320th in second echelon, having been given the objective of smashing the defenses of the right wing of the 97th Jäger Division and enveloping Talmaza from the south. The two Corps began their assault at dawn on April 20 after a short artillery raid but made no progress at all against stiff resistance. German reserves, including elements of the 306th and 9th Infantry Divisions, quickly arrived to bolster the defenses around Talmaza and the offensive collapsed after three days of heavy fighting and five more days of sparring for local positions. On May 4 the Army was ordered to go over to the defense.

== Into the Balkans ==
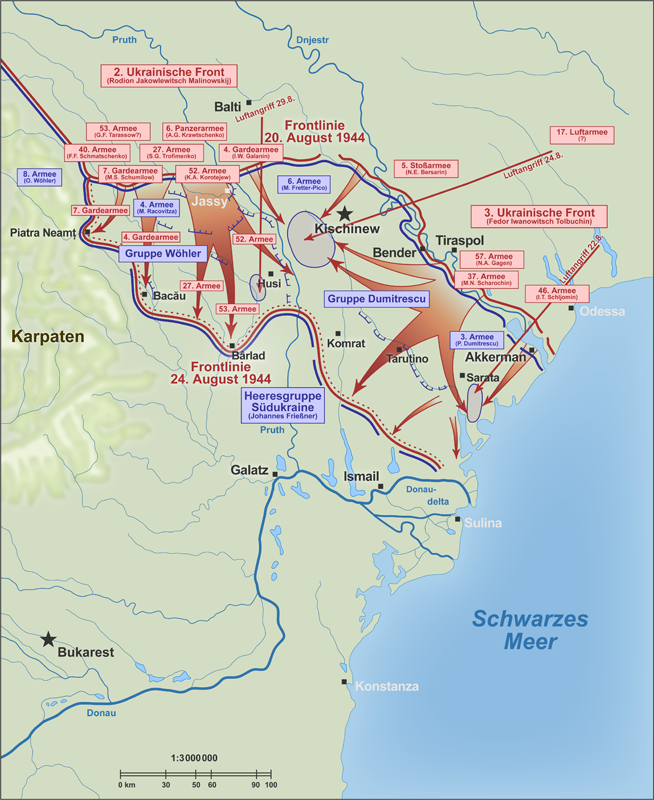
Second Jassy-Kishinev Offensive

The division, along with its 10th Guards Corps, remained in 5th Shock Army until early August, when it was transferred to the 46th Army in the buildup to the new offensive into Bessarabia. 10th Guards Corps (49th, 86th and 109th Guards Divisions) served as the Front reserve.

The offensive began on August 20 but the 86th Guards, along with its Corps, did not see any action in the first days. By 0800 hours on August 24 General Malinovskii had shifted the Corps to the boundary between the 37th and 46th Armies in the Leiptsig area and to the east. By the end of the next day the Corps was to arrive in the Comrat area; by this time the Axis Kishinev grouping had been encircled following the linkup of 3rd and 2nd Ukrainian Fronts. During the next days the 10th Guards Corps exploited to cross the Prut River while the remaining German forces were destroyed east of it.

=== Operations in Hungary ===
On September 20, following the defections of Romania and Bulgaria from the Axis and as it advanced into the Balkan states, the 46th Army was subordinated to 2nd Ukrainian Front. By the first week of October the 86th Guards had advanced to the east bank of the Tisza River just south of Hódmezővásárhely, forcing a crossing there shortly afterward. Near the end of the month it had reached a point west of Kiskunmajsa.

On November 6, Guardsman Alexsandr Dmitrievich Artyomtsev lost his life in an action that would make him a Hero of the Soviet Union. Artyomtsev had participated in the defense of Odessa, his home city, in 1941, during which he was wounded and captured. After escaping from a transit camp he joined the partisans in the catacombs of the city and spent the next two and a half years in partisan operations. He joined the 263rd Guards Rifle Regiment of the 86th Guards when the city was liberated and during the advance into Hungary swam the Tisza with several other soldiers to help establish a bridgehead. At the village of Mate the division ran into a strong Axis position and went over to the defense. On November 6 the height his company occupied came under several counterattacks from German tanks and halftrack-mounted infantry. Artyomtsev destroyed one halftrack with an antitank grenade during the first attack; 30 minutes later, during a second attack he was wounded in the right arm, but carried two more grenades in his left hand to knock out a German tank from under its tracks. He received his Gold Star posthumously on March 24, 1945.

=== Battles for Budapest ===
As of the beginning of December the 86th Guards was still in 10th Guards Corps, and later that month 46th Army returned to 3rd Ukrainian Front. In the planning for the offensive to break the "Margarita Line" and subsequently encircle Budapest, which was to begin on December 20, the division was allocated as the Army's combined-arms reserve. It was located immediately south of the city on the east bank of the Danube, facing the northernmost part of the line on the opposite side of the river.

The encirclement of Budapest was completed on December 26 and was almost immediately followed by Axis operations to relieve its garrison. During January 2-7, 1945 the 3rd Ukrainian Front's right-flank formations were involved in heavy defensive fighting during Operation Konrad I. Both the 2nd Guards Mechanized Corps and the 86th Guards Division were dispatched from 46th Army's sector to cover the breakthrough from the northeast and east. Overnight on January 2/3 the commander of 3rd Ukrainian Front ordered the 18th Tank Corps to move to the Dág–Bajna area and prepare to launch an attack in the direction of Nyergesújfalu in conjunction with units of the 86th and 4th Guards Rifle Divisions. The division met the German attack due south of Esztergom and helped bring it to a halt, for which its subunits were officially recognized. At the start of Operation Konrad III on January 19 it was still in the same area, now holding a bend south of the Danube just north of Esztergom. While the Front suffered heavy losses in this fighting the division was largely out of the path offensive. Konrad ended on January 27 and Budapest fell on February 13.

When the siege ended one of the division's units was recognized with an honorific:

BUDAPEST... 263rd Guards Rifle Regiment (Lt. Col. Denisenko, Andrei Andreevich)... The troops who participated in the liberation of Budapest, by the order of the Supreme High Command of February 13, 1945, and a commendation in Moscow, are given a salute of 24 artillery salvoes from 324 guns.

The 10th Guards Rifle Corps (Lt. Gen. Rubanyuk, Ivan Andreevich) was awarded the same honorific by the same decree. On April 5 the 260th and 265th Guards Rifle Regiments would each receive the Order of Aleksandr Nevsky for their roles in the battle for the Hungarian capital.

=== Into Austria ===
At the beginning of February the 86th Guards was in 10th Guards Corps with the 99th Rifle Division. By a month later the 49th Guards had rejoined the Corps in time for the start of the Vienna Offensive on March 16. The division ended the war west and north of Vienna in the 10th Guards Corps of 46th Army in 2nd Ukrainian Front and its men and women shared the full title of 86th Guards Rifle, Nikolaev, Order of the Red Banner Division. (Russian: 86-я гвардейская стрелковая Николаевская Краснознамённая дивизия.)

== Postwar ==
From July 1950 until October 1952 the division was under the command of Hero of the Soviet Union Maj. Gen. Leonid Aleksandrovich Kolobov, who had led the 389th Rifle Division during the war.

In 1955 the 86th Guards was still part of the 10th Guards Budapest Rifle Corps. The division was redesignated in 1957 as the 86th Guards Motor Rifle Division. On 1 December 1989 the division was reduced to the 5381st Equipment Storage Base and its headquarters moved to Florești, Moldova. There it was taken over by Moldova in early 1992.
