= 32nd Army Corps (Ukraine) =

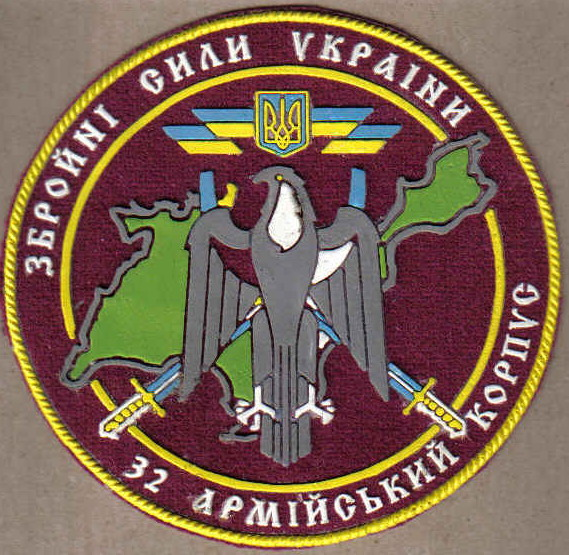
- Active: 1967–2003
- Country: Soviet Union (1967–1991); Ukraine (1992–2003)
- Branch: Soviet Ground Forces (1967–1991); Ukrainian Ground Forces (1992–2003)
- Garrison/HQ: Simferopol

Commanders
- Notable commanders: Dmitry Yazov

The 32nd Königsberg Army Corps (Russian: 32-й Кенигсберский армейский корпус, Ukrainian: 32-й Кенігсбергський армійський корпус, lit. '32-y Kenihsberhs'kyi armiys'kyi korpus') was an army corps of the Soviet Ground Forces and then the Ukrainian Ground Forces. Its Military Unit Number was a/h 44 690, and from 1994 – a/h A-1916.

Its headquarters was located at Simferopol. The corps was established in 1967 and became the Coastal Defence Forces Command in 2003. The Coastal Defence Forces Command was disbanded in 2004.

== History ==
Reports disagree as to when the corps was established. Sammler.ru reports that the 32nd Army Corps was established on 1 October 1967. Narodnaya Armiya, the official newspaper of the Ukrainian Ministry of Defence, states that the corps was formed in 1967. Feskov et al. 2013, via Holm, reports 14 February 1967. Holm also states that it replaced the 45th Army Corps, which was transferred to the Far East.

Initially, its units included Corps Headquarters, the 52nd (moved to Nizhneudinsk in April 1969), 126th and 157th Motor Rifle Divisions, 9th Separate Engineer-Sapper Battalion (оисб), 19 окр (Independent Commandant's Point?) and the 909th Communications Battalion (909 обс). In 1980, the 159th Motor Rifle Division was activated in Sovetskoye, Crimean Oblast, as a mobilisation division, and joined the corps. In 1982, the 784th Separate Chemical Defence Battalion was formed. In 1983, 301st Artillery Brigade at Simferopol joined the corps.

In 1987, the 157th Motor Rifle became the 710th Territorial Training Centre, and the 159th Motor Rifle Division became the 711th Territorial Training Centre. In 1989, more separate repair and recovery battalions were formed. Also in the same year, the 126th Motor Rifle Division was transferred to the Black Sea Fleet and the 711th Territorial Training Centre was disbanded. In 1990, the 157th Motor Rifle Division at Kerch became the 5378th Weapons and Equipment Storage Base. In 1991, an antiaircraft missile brigade became part of the corps.

From 1992 to 2004, the corps included the 84th and 127th Separate Mechanized Brigades, 501st Separate Mechanized Regiment and other units. In April 2003, parts of the 32nd Army Corps were transferred to the Ukrainian Navy. On 30 July, the 32nd Army Corps became the Coastal Defence Forces Command (KBVO Navy APU). On 30 December 2004, the Coastal Defence Forces Command was disbanded.

== Corps units 2001 ==
Corps headquarters was at Simferopol, responsible to Operational Command South and then HQ Ukrainian Ground Forces.

Unit	Base	Remarks
84th Separate Mechanised Brigade	Perevalnoe	Crimean Oblast
127th Separate Mechanised Brigade	Feodosiya	
301st Artillery Brigade (32 АК ЮжнОК)	Simferopol	Later became 406th Artillery Regiment, then 406th Artillery Brigade (Ukraine)
3rd Separate Regiment of Special Designation (32 АК ЮжнОК)	Pervomaiskyi	Later became the 3rd Separate Special Purpose Regiment (Ukraine)
501st Separate Mechanised Regiment (омп) (32 АК ЮжнОК)	Kerch	
816th Rocket Artillery Regiment	Simferopol	
1398th Anti-Tank Artillery Regiment	Simferopol	
70th Engineer Regiment	Bakhchysarai	
4th Separate Communications Regiment	Simferopol	
287th Separate Radio Battalion	Simferopol	
150th Separate Chemical Defence Battalion	Perevalnoe	
858th Separate Repair and Recovery Battalion	Sovetsky	

== Subordination ==
- 1967 – 1997 – Odessa Military District;
- to 03.01.1998, the – Shvd. OK NE Armed Forces of Ukraine (Швд.ОК СВ ВС Украины);
- From 22.04.2003. – Ukrainian Naval Forces (ВМС Украины);
- 30.07.2003. – Transformed into a KVBO Navy APU (КВБО ВМС ВСУ);
- 30.12.2004 – KVBO Navy APU (КВБО ВМС ВСУ) disbanded.

== Commanders ==
Source: Joint Publications Research Service, Central Eurasia, Director of Military Organizations and Personnel, JPRS-UMA-92-043, 2 December 1992, 185.; Also from

- Major General Vladimir Meretskov (14 February 1967 – 28 May 1969)
- Major General Pyotr Shkidchenko (4 July 1969 – 26 February 1971)
- Lieutenant General Dmitry Yazov (5 March 1971 – 19 January 1973)
- Major General Anatoly Ryakhov (28 February 1973 – 7 March 1974)
- Major General Vladimir Arkhipov (19 April 1974 – 6 July 1975)
- Lieutenant General Alexander Kovtunov (7 July 1975 – 1976)
- Major General Vladimir Shevtsov (1982-28 June 1984)
- Lieutenant General Valentin Yakovlev (27 June 1984 – 1987)
- Major General Valery Kuznetsov (1987 – April 1992)(Moscow NEZAVISIMAYA GAZETA in Russian 31 Jul 92 p 3).
- Major General Viktor Paily (Moscow NEZAVISIMAYA GAZETA m Russian Jul 92 p 3).
