= Andrey Andreyev =

Andrey Andreyev or Andrey Andreev may refer to:

- Andrey Andreyevich Andreyev (1895–1971), Soviet politician
- Andrey Andreev (born 1974), Russian businessman, founder of Badoo
- Andrey Anatoliyevich Andreyev (born 1976), Russian politician
- Andrey Matveyevich Andreyev (1905–1983), Soviet Colonel general and Hero of the Soviet Union
- Andrey Vladimirovich Andreyev, Russian diplomat and current Ambassador of Russia to Madagascar
