= 315th Division =

315th Division may refer to:

- 315th Rifle Division, Soviet Union
- 315th Air Division, United States

== See also ==
- List of military divisions by number
