= Leonid Kolobov =

Soviet Army Lieutenant general

Leonid Alexandrovich Kolobov
- Леонид Александрович Колобов
- Born: 8 August 1907; Shakha village, Pereslavsky Uyezd, Vladimir Governorate, Russian Empire
- Died: 13 November 1993 (aged 86); Moscow, Russia
- Military career
- Allegiance: Soviet Union
- Branch: Soviet Army
- Service years: 1929–1969
- Rank: Lieutenant general
- Commands: 389th Rifle Division; 97th Guards Rifle Division; 114th Guards Airborne Division; 86th Guards Rifle Division; 4th Guards Army Corps
- Conflicts: World War II; Winter War; Eastern Front; Battle of the Caucasus; Zhitomir-Berdichev Offensive; Dnieper-Carpathian Offensive; Lvov-Sandomierz Offensive; Sandomierz-Silesian Offensive; Lower Silesian Offensive; Berlin Offensive; Prague Offensive
- Awards: Hero of the Soviet Union

Leonid Alexandrovich Kolobov (Russian: Леони́д Алекса́ндрович Ко́лобов; 8 August 1907 – 13 November 1993) was a Soviet Army Lieutenant general and Hero of the Soviet Union. After being drafted into the Red Army in 1928, Kolobov graduated from the Moscow Infantry School and became an officer. In 1940 he became chief of staff of a Finnish People's Army infantry division. In September 1941, Kolobov became chief of staff of the 408th Rifle Division in Iran. From September 1942 he commanded the 389th Rifle Division. He led the division until the end of the war, being awarded the title Hero of the Soviet Union for his leadership in the Lvov–Sandomierz Offensive. Postwar, he led the 97th Guards Rifle Division, 114th Guards Airborne Division, 86th Guards Rifle Division and 4th Guards Army Corps. Kolobov also served as an adviser in East Germany during the 1950s. He retired in 1969, lived in Moscow and died in 1993.

== Early life and Interwar period ==
Kolobov was born on 8 August 1907 in the village of Shakha in Vladimir Governorate. In 1921, he graduated from 5th grade in Bektyshevo village. Between February and October 1926 he worked as a laborer at the Alexandrov railway station. Kolobov worked as a storekeeper at the Moscow Savyolovskaya railway station between 1926 and 1928.

Called up for military service in October 1928, Kolobov was selected for officer training and graduated from the Moscow Infantry School in March 1931. He joined the Communist Party of the Soviet Union in the latter year. Kolobov was first posted to the 81st Rifle Regiment of the 27th Rifle Division, stationed at Vitebsk in the Belorussian Military District. There, he served as a machine gun platoon commander and platoon commander in the regimental school. Transferred to the 4th Mechanized Brigade at Bobruisk in April 1933, Kolobov became a company commander, assistant battalion chief of staff, and acting battalion chief of staff with the brigade. He received the rank of senior lieutenant on 13 January 1936 and was promoted to captain on 31 December 1938. In December 1939, he graduated from the Frunze Military Academy, having begun his studies there in October 1937.

== Winter War and World War II ==
Between January and March 1940, Kolobov was chief of staff of the 3rd Rifle Division of the Finnish People's Army of the puppet Finnish Democratic Republic. Between 1940 and 1941 he was commander of the training battalion at the Telavi small arms and mortar school. In 1941 he was promoted to major. Between August and September 1941 he was officer for special assignments of the commander of the Transcaucasian Front. Between September 1941 and August 1942, Kolobov was chief of staff of the 408th Rifle Division. The division guarded the Turkish border and was part of the Soviet troops in Iran. On 25 July 1942, he was promoted to lieutenant colonel. In August 1942, Kolobov became chief of staff of the 11th Guards Rifle Corps, fighting in the Battle of the Caucasus.

In September 1942, Kolobov was appointed commander of the 389th Rifle Division. In January and February 1943, he led the division in the North Caucasian Strategic Offensive. On 14 February, he was promoted to colonel. On 2 April, Kolobov received his first Order of the Red Banner. During September and October, the division fought in the Novorossiysk-Taman Strategic Offensive. On 22 October, he was awarded the Order of the Patriotic War 1st class. From December 1943 the division fought in the Zhitomir–Berdichev Offensive. On 3 January 1944 Kolobov was awarded a second Order of the Red Banner. In March and April 1944 the division fought in the Proskurov-Chernivtsi Offensive. From July, the division fought in the Lvov–Sandomierz Offensive. On 13 July, the division broke through the German defenses near Horokhiv, crossed the Bug River. In the next week the division reportedly killed more than 2,000 German soldiers. On 13 September, Kolobov was promoted to major general. On 23 September, Kolobov was awarded the title Hero of the Soviet Union and the Order of Lenin for his actions.

From January 1945, the division fought in the Sandomierz–Silesian Offensive. In February, it fought in the Lower Silesian Offensive. In March, the division fought in the Upper Silesian Offensive. On 6 April, Kolobov was awarded the Order of Suvorov 2nd class. From April, the division fought in the Berlin Offensive. It ended the war in early May fighting in the Prague Offensive. On 29 May 1945, Kolobov was awarded the Order of Kutuzov 2nd class.

== Postwar ==
In June 1945, Kolobov became commander of the 97th Guards Rifle Division in the Central Group of Forces. In March 1947 he was sent to the Military Academy of the General Staff to take Higher Academic Courses. After graduating in 1948, he became commander of the 114th Guards Airborne Division in the Belorussian Military District. On 20 June 1949 Kolobov was awarded his third Order of the Red Banner. In July 1950 he became commander of the 86th Guards Rifle Division in the Odessa Military District. In October 1952 he was sent to East Germany as an advisor with an infantry division. In September 1953 Kolobov became senior military advisor to the chief of Territorial Administration of the Volkspolizei Barracks Units. On 5 November 1954, he was awarded the Order of Lenin a second time. In February 1956 he was senior military advisor to the commander of an infantry district. In October 1957, Kolobov became commander of the 4th Guards Army Corps in Tallinn. Between 1958 and 1960 he was a member of the Central Committee of the Communist Party of Estonia. On 18 February 1958 he was promoted to Lieutenant general. Between 1959 and 1969 he was deputy chief of the Military-Political Academy. From 1959 to 1963 he was a deputy of the Supreme Soviet of the Estonian Soviet Socialist Republic for its 5th convocation. In May 1969, he retired. Kolobov lived in Moscow. On 6 April 1985, he was awarded a second Order of the Patriotic War, 1st class on the 40th anniversary of the end of World War II. He died on 13 November 1993 and was buried in the Mitino Cemetery.
