= Voronezh Military District =

The Voronezh Military District was a formation of the Soviet Armed Forces, which existed in 1945–1946 and 1949–1960, respectively. District headquarters was in Voronezh.

The District was formed on July 9, 1945, and incorporated the Voronezh Oblast, the Kursk Oblast, the Orel Oblast, and the Tambov Oblast. It was formed from the headquarters of the Orel Military District and the 6th Army. On 4 February 1946, it was included into the Moscow Military District. It was formed for the second time on May 28, 1949. It included the former area of the district, and since January 1954 the newly formed Lipetsk, Belgorod and Balashov areas. In 1955, the district included the 11th Guards Rifle Corps, and the 3rd Guards, 68th and 87th Guards Rifle Divisions, and the 75th Mechanised Division.

It was disbanded on 18 August 1960 and its territory and troops incorporated within the Moscow Military District.

== Commanders of troops of the Voronezh Military District ==
- 1945-1946 - Colonel-General Vladimir Zakharovich Romanovsky
- 1949-1955 - Colonel-General Mikhail Shumilov
- 1955-1957 - Colonel-General Afanasy Beloborodov
- 1957-1960 - Colonel-General Andrey Matveyevich Andreyev

== Sources ==
- Military Encyclopedia. Moscow-2002.
