= 408th Rifle Division =

Infantry division of the Red Army

408th Rifle Division (14 August 1941 – 25 November 1942)
- Active: 1941–1942
- Country: Soviet Union
- Branch: Red Army
- Type: Division
- Role: Infantry
- Engagements: Anglo-Soviet invasion of Iran; Battle of the Caucasus; Tuapse Defensive Operation

Commanders
- Notable commanders: Col. Pavel Nikolaievich Kitsuk

The 408th Rifle Division was formed as an infantry division of the Red Army, and served in that role in 1941-42. It was officially considered an Armenian National division, but in fact was made up of several other nationalities as well. After forming it remained in service in the Caucasus and Iran until the summer of 1942, when it was redeployed to help counter the German drive toward Tuapse. The 408th had a short and undistinguished career as a combat formation, and was soon disbanded.

== Formation ==
The 408th Rifle Division began forming on 14 August 1941 at Yerevan in the Transcaucasus Military District along with its "sister" 409th Rifle Division nearby. Its order of battle, based on the first wartime shtat (table of organization and equipment) for rifle divisions, was as follows:

- 663rd Rifle Regiment
- 670th Rifle Regiment
- 672nd Rifle Regiment
- 963rd Artillery Regiment
- 195th Antitank Battalion
- 191st Antiaircraft Battery (later 687th Antiaircraft Battalion)
- 684th Mortar Battalion
- 462nd Reconnaissance Company
- 681st Sapper Battalion
- 851st Signal Battalion
- 485th Medical/Sanitation Battalion
- 478th Chemical Protection (Anti-gas) Company
- 343rd Motor Transport Company
- 250th Field Bakery
- 408th Divisional Veterinary Hospital
- 1459th Field Postal Station
- 730th Field Office of the State Bank

The division was officially named as an Armenian unit, but the reality was significantly different. At the time of its formation the breakdown of nationalities among its personnel was as follows:

- 31% Russian and Ukrainian
- 25% Georgian
- 23% Azerbaijani
- 21% Armenian

While the division was formed in Armenia, Armenian nationals were very much in the minority. For nearly the entire first year of its service, the 408th was in 45th Army along the border with Turkey and in the occupation force in Iran. It was commanded by Col. Pavel Nikolaievich Kitzuk throughout its existence; Maj. (later, Lt. Col.) Leonid Kolobov served as chief of staff from September 1941 to August 1942.

== Combat service ==
In July 1942 the German 17th Army began an offensive through the passes of the Caucasus Mountains towards the Soviet ports along the eastern coast of the Black Sea, focusing on Tuapse. Given this threat, the 408th was redeployed in this direction and was split up. While the bulk of the division joined the Tuapse Defense Region, the 672nd Rifle Regiment was detached in September to the 47th Army defending the mountain passes north of the city. By 23 September the entire division formed this Army's reserve. During the following weeks the German XXXXIX Mountain Corps gradually forced its way southwards, making contact with the partly-isolated and under-supplied 408th on 14 October. On the 21st, the German force launched an assault from the Gunaika River valley towards the villages of Goitkh and Georgievskoe. An intense artillery barrage destroyed the division's headquarters near Mount Semashkho, killing and wounding most of its staff. With command and control devastated, the defenses of the 408th, and the adjacent 107th Rifle Brigade, were shattered. The Germans captured Goitkh and encircled and destroyed most of the division, with just small groups able to break out and link up with the nearby 353rd and 383rd Rifle Divisions.

Following this debacle, the remnants of the division were drawn back to the Tuapse Defense Region. In an unusual decision, the remaining men and equipment of the 408th were distributed to other formations of the 47th Army, and the division was permanently disbanded on 25 November.
