= Semyon Kozak =

Ukrainian Soviet Army lieutenant general

Semyon Antonovich Kozak
- Born: 23 May [O.S. 10 May] 1902; Iskorost, Volhynian Governorate, Russian Empire
- Died: 24 December 1953 (aged 51); Khabarovsk, Soviet Union
- Military career
- Allegiance: Soviet Union
- Branch: Red Army (Soviet Army from 1946)
- Service years: 1924 – 1953
- Rank: Lieutenant general
- Conflicts: Russian Civil War; World War II
- Awards: Hero of the Soviet Union (twice)

Semyon Antonovich Kozak (Russian: Семён Анто́нович Коза́к; 23 May [O.S. 10 May] 1902 – 24 December 1953) was a Ukrainian Soviet Army lieutenant general who was twice awarded the title Hero of the Soviet Union for his command of a division during World War II.

== Early life, Russian Civil War, and interwar period ==
A Ukrainian, Kozak was born on 23 May [O.S. 10 May] 1902 in the village of Iskorost, Volhynian Governorate. During the Russian Civil War, from March 1921, he worked as a storekeeper on the Southwestern Railroad. Kozak fought as part of a separate company of the Forces of Special Purpose (ChON) against the nationalist armed bands of Garas and Ditrovsky in Ovruch between May and August 1922. He began a year of studies at the provincial Soviet Party School at Zhitomir in October 1922 and at the end of this period was sent to Olevsk and Barash as a party worker. With a detachment of workers of the district executive committee and the district party committee, Kozak participated in the suppression of the band of Vasilenko near Barash in December 1923.

Drafted into the Red Army on 28 March 1924, Kozak was sent to the howitzer artillery battalion of the 23rd Rifle Division of the Ukrainian Military District in Chuguyev, where he served successively as a Krasnoarmeyets-politruk, head of the party organization, and assistant military commissar of the 3rd battery. After becoming temporary politruk of the battalion school, he passed the examination to complete a course at the Kiev Artillery School in 1928. From January 1929 Kozak served successively as commander of the 5th battery and then the training battery of the artillery regiment of the 51st Rifle Division, and as an instructor at the district commanders' courses at Nikolayev.

Kozak completed the Leningrad Armored Courses for Improvement and Retraining of Command Personnel between May and September 1932. Upon his return to his old unit, Kozak was appointed assistant chief of equipment of Odessa Detachment No. 1, the separate tankette battalion of the 51st Rifle Division. He was sent back to complete the Leningrad Armored Courses again between 14 March and 1 December 1933, after which he was appointed commander and tactics instructor at the Leningrad Military School for Tank Technicians. In August 1935, he became a gunnery instructor, and in January 1936 a senior tactics instructor, then acting commander of the 3rd battalion of the school.

At the same time, he studied at the external department of the Frunze Military Academy from October 1935, and in October 1937 was transferred to the 2nd course of the academy special department. Graduating from the academy in August 1936, he remained there as a junior instructor of the armored forces department. On 1 November 1938 he received the rank of junior instructor. With a group of academy students, Kozak was sent to take part in the Soviet invasion of Poland during September and October 1939, advancing into western Ukraine. In April 1941 he was appointed an instructor in the tactics and armored forces departments of the academy.

== World War II ==
After the German invasion of the Soviet Union, then-Lieutenant Colonel Kozak was appointed senior inspector of the rifle forces group of the inspection department for new formations of the Main Directorate for the Formation and Manning of the Red Army (Glavupraform). From January 1942 he served a senior inspector of the 1st department of the Directorate for Inspection and Training of New Formations of Rifle Units, part of Glavupraform. In October he was sent to the Stalingrad Front and from 29 October served as deputy chief of staff for the forward command post of the 64th Army, with which he took part in the Battle of Stalingrad. By then a colonel, Kozak took command of the 73rd Guards Rifle Division on 18 April 1943. By this time, the division had arrived to the Voronezh Front and was involved in defensive battles on the Belgorod axis. From August the division took part in the Kharkov offensive operation and the Battle of the Dnieper. In late September units of the 73rd Guards were among the first to cross the Dnieper in the area of Stary Orlik, capturing and expanding a bridgehead. For the crossing of the Dnieper twenty soldiers of the division were made Heroes of the Soviet Union, and Kozak himself was awarded the title on 26 October.

From 31 December 1943 to 18 January 1944, Kozak temporarily commanded the 75th Rifle Corps of the 53rd Army of the 2nd Ukrainian Front, then returned to command of the 73rd. At this time the division was part of the 64th Rifle Corps of the 57th Army, defending southwest of Kirovograd. From 22 February the division and its army were assigned to the 3rd Ukrainian Front, taking part in the Bereznegovatoye–Snigirevka, Odessa, Jassy–Kishinev, and Belgrade offensives. During the latter the division took part in the liberation of Belgrade on 20 October, for which it awarded the Order of the Red Banner on 14 November.

During the Budapest offensive in early November, the division crossed the Danube near Batina, captured an important bridgehead and expanded it in sustained fighting. For this action Kozak was awarded a second Gold Star Medal on 28 April 1945, receiving the rare distinction of being a twice Hero of the Soviet Union. Kozak was promoted to command the 21st Guards Rifle Corps of the 4th Guards Army on 10 March 1945, which he led in the Vienna offensive.

== Postwar ==
After the end of the war, Lieutenant General Kozak continued to command the corps in the Central Group of Forces. In April 1947 he was transferred to the Odessa Military District to command the 10th Guards Rifle Corps. In July 1950 he was appointed assistant commander of the Far Eastern Military District. From April 1953 he served as deputy commander of the 15th Army, which he rose to command in September of that year. While serving in command of the army, Kozak died on 24 December 1953 in Khabarovsk. He was buried in the Novodevichy Cemetery.

== Decorations ==
Kozak was a recipient of the following decorations:

- Hero of the Soviet Union (2)
- Order of Lenin (2)
- Order of the Red Banner (4)
- Order of Suvorov, 2nd class
- Order of Kutuzov, 2nd class
- Order of Bogdan Khmelnitsky, 2nd class
- Medals
- Foreign orders, including People's Hero of Yugoslavia
