= Mikhail Sangursky =

Soviet komkor (corps commander) and division commander

- Born: 1894; Moscow, Russian Empire
- Died: 28 July 1938 (aged 43–44) Soviet Union
- Allegiance: Russian Empire; Soviet Union
- Branch: Imperial Russian Army; Soviet Red Army
- Service years: 1914–1917 (Russian Empire); 1918–1937 (Soviet Union)
- Rank: Komkor
- Commands: 15th Rifle Division; 11th Rifle Corps
- Conflicts: World War I Russian Civil War

Mikhail Vladimirovich Sangursky (1894 – 28 July 1938) was a Soviet division commander and Komkor (corps commander). He was born in Moscow. He fought for the Imperial Russian Army in World War I before going over to the Bolsheviks in the subsequent Civil War. He was recipient of the Order of the Red Banner. He was executed during the Great Purge.

Military offices
Preceded by Alexander Sirotkin	Commander of the 15th Rifle Division; November 1919 – February 1920	Succeeded by Alexander Sedyakin
Preceded by	Commander of the 11th Rifle Corps; March 1928-1929	Succeeded by
