= 389th Rifle Division =

- Active: October 1941 – 6 July 1945
- Disbanded: 6 July 1945
- Country: Soviet Union
- Branch: Infantry
- Type: Red Army
- Engagements: The German-Soviet War
- Decorations: Order of the Red Banner; Order of Suvorov; Order of Bohdan Khmelnytsky
- Battle honours: Berdychiv; Kielce

Commanders
- Notable commanders: Colonel Sergei Bunyachenko; Major general Leonid Kolobov

The 389th Rifle Division was an infantry division of the Soviet Union during World War II.

The division was formed in October 1941 part of the 53rd Army of the Central Asian Military District, and was deployed for active field duty from May 1942 through to May 1945.

The 389th Rifle Division particularly distinguished itself in early January 1944 during the liberation of Berdychiv from the German military, for which it was awarded the honorary title of "Berdychevskaya".

For its actions in the Berlin Offensive, the 389th was awarded the Order of Bogdan Khmelnitsky, 2nd class, on 4 June 1945.

In a Stavka directive dated 29 May 1945, the 389th Rifle Division was listed among those to be disbanded in place.
