= Andrey Matveyevich Andreyev =

Soviet politician (1905–1983)

- Андрей Матвеевич Андреев
- Born: 30 October 1905; St. Petersburg, Russian Empire
- Died: 17 November 1986 (aged 83); Moscow, Soviet Union
- Burial place: Kuntsevo Cemetery
- Military career
- Allegiance: Soviet Union
- Branch: Soviet Border Troops (1924–1941); Soviet Army (1941–1973)
- Service years: 1924–1973
- Rank: Colonel general
- Commands: 29th Rifle Corps; 4th Guards Rifle Corps; 125th Rifle Corps; 7th Guards Rifle Corps; 19th Rifle Corps; 3rd Shock Army; 28th Army; Voronezh Military District; Military Institute of Foreign Languages
- Conflicts: World War II; Winter War; Eastern Front; Siege of Leningrad; Operation Kutuzov; Battle of the Dnieper; Operation Bagration; Lublin-Brest Offensive; Vistula-Oder Offensive; East Pomeranian Offensive; Battle of Berlin
- Awards: Hero of the Soviet Union; Order of Lenin (2); Order of the Red Banner (5); Order of Kutuzov, 1st class; Order of Bogdan Khmelnitsky, 1st class; Order of Suvorov, 2nd class; Order of the Red Star; Order of the Badge of Honour; Order of the Cross of Grunwald, 2nd class; Golden Cross of the Virtuti Militari

Andrey Matveyevich Andreyev (Russian: Андрей Матвеевич Андреев; 30 October 1905 – 17 November 1983) was a Soviet Army Colonel general and Hero of the Soviet Union. Andreyev joined the Soviet Border Troops in 1924 and became an officer. After graduating from the Frunze Military Academy, he was given command of a border detachment. Andreyev fought in the Winter War as commander of a ski regiment of the border troops. After spending the first months of World War II as logistics chief of the 23rd Army, he was appointed to command the 43rd Rifle Division in September. In late October he took command of the 86th Rifle Division, fighting in the Nevsky Pyatachok. In April 1942 Andreyev became deputy commander of the 23rd Army and then the 42nd Army in May. He became commander of a special group in the 42nd Army's Staro-Panovo Offensive, in which he was wounded.

In November 1942 he took command of the newly formed 102nd Rifle Division and led it in Operation Kutuzov, the Battle of the Dnieper and the Gomel-Rechitsa Offensive. In December 1943 he was appointed commander of the 29th Rifle Corps and fought in the Operation Bagration and the Lublin–Brest Offensive. In September, Andreyev became commander of the 4th Guards Rifle Corps, defending the Magnuszew bridgehead. In November he was appointed deputy commander of the 47th Army and in December given command of the 125th Rifle Corps. He led the corps in the Vistula–Oder Offensive, East Pomeranian Offensive and the Battle of Berlin. In April 1945 he was awarded the title Hero of the Soviet Union for his leadership in the capture of Warsaw. Postwar, he commanded the 4th Guards Rifle Corps, 7th Guards Rifle Corps, 19th Rifle Corps, 3rd Shock Army, 28th Army and Voronezh Military District. He was then Warsaw Pact representative to the Albanian People's Army and Czechoslovak People's Army. After leading the Military Institute of Foreign Languages, Andreyev retired in 1973. He lived in Moscow and died in 1983.

== Early life ==
Andreyev was born on 30 October 1905 in Saint Petersburg to Matvey Andreyev, a turner, and Praskovya Nikitichna, a weaver. His family was extremely poor. In 1920 Matvey decided to return to his home village of Tatarsk in Smolensk Governorate along with his family, where he was given redistributed land. Andreyev worked on the farm and graduated from high school in 1922.

== Interwar ==
In August 1924, Andreyev joined the Soviet Border Troops. He served in the 15th Zaslonovo Border Detachment. In May 1925 he was sent to study at the Belorussian School of Frontier Troops, from which he graduated in 1927. He was then the assistant chief of a frontier post in the 12th Bigosovo Border Detachment and later transferred to the same position in the 14th Pleshchenitsy Border Detachment. Between 1930 and 1933 he was a political instructor in the 28th Separate Smolensk Border Troops Battalion. In 1935, he graduated from the Higher School of the Border Troops in Moscow. Between 1935 and 1938 Andreyev was assistant political commissar of the regiment, battalion commander, chief of the regimental school and finally battalion commander again in the 13th Alma-Ata NKVD Motor Rifle Regiment. In 1939, he graduated from the Frunze Military Academy. In May 1939, Andreyev became chief of the 5th Sestroretsk Border Detachment. On 5 May, he was promoted to Major.

== Winter War and World War II ==
In November 1939 the border detachment was upgraded into the 5th NKVD Regiment of Operational Troops. It fought in the Winter War with Andreyev in command. On 13 February, he was promoted to colonel. In April 1940 the regiment became a border detachment again, now stationed at Enso. In July 1941 Andreyev became the logistics chief for 23rd Army. He fought in battles north of Leningrad on the Karelian Isthmus. At the beginning of September he became commander of the People's Militia in Sestroretsk. Later in the month, Andreyev took command of the 43rd Rifle Division. In October, he transferred to command the 86th Rifle Division. On 6 February 1942, he was awarded the Order of the Red Banner. Andreyev led the division in the Nevsky Pyatachok until April 1942, when he became deputy commander of the 23rd Army. In May he became deputy commander of the 42nd Army. On 3 May he was promoted to major general. In July, Andreyev was given command of troops on 42nd Army's right flank to conduct the local Staro-Panovo Offensive to capture the German strongholds of Staro-Panovo and Uritsk. The offensive began on 22 July and initially achieved success when both objectives were captured, but strong German counterattacks inflicted heavy losses on Soviet troops, forcing them to withdraw back to the starting positions on 25 July. Andreyev was wounded on 23 July while at his command post southeast of Ligovo.

In October 1942, Andreyev was summoned to Moscow, where he received orders to lead the Far Eastern NKVD Rifle Division, then forming at Khabarovsk. In February 1943, the division was redesignated as the 102nd Far Eastern Rifle Division. The division was transported to Yelets and became part of the 70th Army. The division then marched 200 kilometers to positions southeast of Dmitrovsk-Orlovsky, in preparation for the Dmitriyev-Sevsk Offensive. The 16th and 30th Rifle Regiments attacked German positions from the night of 7–8 March, but were soon repulsed. On 27 July, the division went on the offensive as part of Operation Kutuzov. By 12 August, it had captured Dmitrovsk-Orlovsky. On 22 August the division became part of the 48th Army and transferred to the area of Pochinok-Aleshok in Oryol Oblast. Between 26 and 31 August, the division advanced towards the Desna. Between 8 and 12 September the division crossed the Desna and captured Novgorod-Seversky on 16 September. For its actions the division was given the honorific "Novgorod-Seversky" and Andreyev received the Order of Suvorov 2nd class. The division continued the advance toward Gomel, crossing the Sozh River on the night of 7–8 October and capturing a bridgehead. The division fought in the Gomel-Rechitsa Offensive. On 25 November the western outskirts of Gomel were captured by the 30th Rifle Regiment, and the rest of the city fell the next day. For its actions the division was awarded the Order of the Red Banner.

In early December, Andreyev was appointed commander of the 29th Rifle Corps. The corps fought in Operation Bagration from June 1944. The offensive began on 24 June and on 26 June the corps was across the Dobasna. On the night of 28 June it crossed the Berezina River. The corps helped capture Babruysk, Pukhavichy and Baranovichi. On 23 July, Andreyev was awarded the Order of Kutuzov 1st class. By 3 September, the corps was on the right bank of the Narew. It crossed the river and seized bridgeheads, which it fought fierce battles to retain. On 7 September Andreyev was given command of the 4th Guards Rifle Corps. He led the corps in its defense of the Magnuszew bridgehead until November. In November he became the deputy commander of the 47th Army. Andreyev took command of the 125th Rifle Corps in December.

On 15 January 1945, the Warsaw-Poznan Offensive, part of the Vistula–Oder Offensive, began. The corps broke through German defenses and crossed the Vistula. On 17 January, the corps helped capture Warsaw. Between 15 and 25 January, the corps reportedly took 2,000 prisoners. The corps continued to advance and on 11 February captured Wałcz. By 14 February, it captured Schneidemuhl, which had been declared a fortress city. On 6 April, Matveyev was awarded the title Hero of the Soviet Union and the Order of Lenin for his leadership. From April, the corps fought in the Battle of Berlin, in which it reached Potsdam. On 20 April, he was promoted to lieutenant general. On 29 May, he was awarded the Order of Bogdan Khmelnitsky 1st class.

== Postwar ==
In January 1946, Andreyev became commander of the 4th Guards Rifle Corps again. In August he was appointed commander of the 7th Guards Rifle Corps in the Leningrad Military District. In April 1947 he became commander of the 19th Rifle Corps in the Transcaucasian Military District. In June 1948 he began courses at the Military Academy of the General Staff, from which he graduated in 1949. In April 1949 he became assistant commander of the 3rd Shock Army. Between December 1950 and January 1954 Andreyev led the 3rd Shock Army. In January 1954 he transferred to command the 28th Army. Between 1956 and 1960 he was a member of the Central Committee of the Communist Party of Belarus. Andreyev was promoted to Colonel general. In June 1957 he became commander of the Voronezh Military District. Between 1958 and 1962 he was a deputy of the Supreme Soviet of the Soviet Union at its 5th convocation. Between June 1960 and August 1951 he was Warsaw Pact senior representative to the Albanian People's Army. Between January 1962 and August 1963 he was senior representative to the Czechoslovak People's Army. In August 1963 he became head of the Military Institute of Foreign Languages. On 19 December 1968 he was awarded the Golden Cross of the Virtuti Militari. Andreyev retired in November 1973. He died on 17 November 1983 and was buried in the Kuntsevo Cemetery. His memoirs were posthumously published by Voenizdat in 1984.

== Legacy ==
A street in Setroretsk is named for Andreyev. The border detachment at Sosnovy Bor is also named for Andreyev.
