= Mustvee (river) =

River in Estonia

Mustvee River
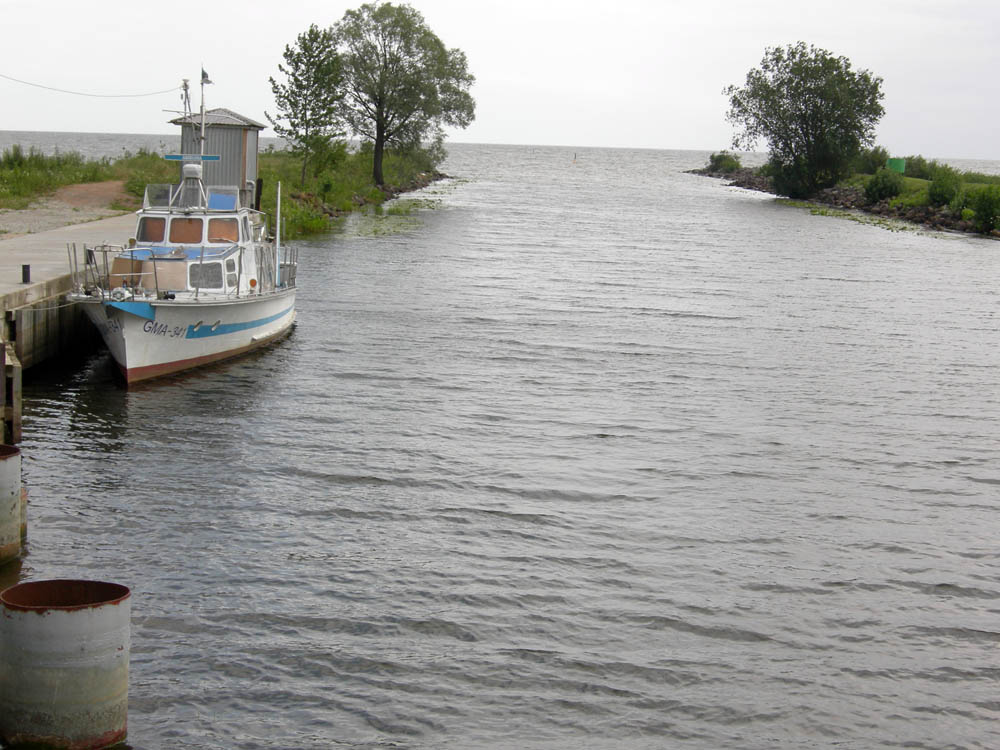

Location
- Country: Estonia

Physical characteristics
- Mouth: Lake Peipus
  - location: Mustvee
  - coordinates: 58°50′48″N 26°57′10″E
- Length: 43.3 km (26.9 mi)
- Basin size: 179.5 km^{2} (69.3 sq mi)

The Mustvee River is a river in Jõgeva County, Estonia. The river is 43.3 km long and basin size is 179.5 km^{2}. It empties into Lake Peipus.
