= 315th Rifle Division =

Soviet military unit

- Active: 1942–1947, 1951–1955
- Country: Soviet Union
- Branch: Red Army (1942-1946); Soviet Army (1947-1955)
- Type: Infantry
- Size: Division
- Engagements: Battle of Stalingrad; Operation Uranus; Operation Winter Storm; Operation Little Saturn; Battle of Rostov (1943); Donbas Strategic Offensive; Melitopol Offensive; Crimean Offensive
- Decorations: Order of the Red Banner
- Battle honours: Melitopol

Commanders
- Notable commanders: Mikhail Knyazev; Dmity Kuropatenko; Askanaz Karapetyan

The 315th Rifle Division was a standard Red Army rifle division formed for the first time on February 12, 1942, in the Siberian Military District before being sent to the vicinity of Stalingrad, where it was engaged in the futile efforts to break through to the besieged city from the north near Kotluban. After rebuilding, it was part of the southern thrust of Operation Uranus in November, helping to encircle the German 6th Army and also to hold off its would-be rescuers. During 1943 and early 1944 the division advanced through the southern Donbas and into Ukraine, where it was honored for its role in the liberation of Melitopol, before taking part in the liberation of the Crimea in April and May 1944. The 315th Rifle Division served for the last year of the war as part of the garrison of the Crimea. However, the unit, and its successors, continued to serve well into the postwar era.

== Formation ==
The 315th began forming on February 12, 1942, at Barnaul in the Siberian Military District. Maj. Gen. Mikhail Semyonovich Knyazev was assigned to command the same day and he would remain in this position for the next year. When it finished forming in the Altaisk region in May it had 12,439 officers and men assigned, 64.4 percent of whom were under 30 years of age. Its basic order of battle was as follows:

- 362nd Rifle Regiment
- 724th Rifle Regiment
- 1328th Rifle Regiment
- 1012th Artillery Regiment

By the end of May the division had moved west and was assigned to the 8th Reserve Army in the Reserve of the Supreme High Command.

== Stalingrad Campaign ==
In August the 315th was first assigned to the 1st Guards Army, to the north of Stalingrad, but it arrived at the front at a moment of particular crisis, just as the German 6th Army's XIV Panzer Corps completed its advance from the Don River to the Volga River, north of the city, on August 23. Col. Gen. A.I. Yeryomenko, commander of the Southeastern Front, ordered the division to reinforce the defenses of 4th Tank Army, on the north side of the "Volga Corridor". Two days later it was part of Group Kovalenko, along with two tank corps and two other rifle divisions, ordered to attack southwards against the corridor. The attack made little progress.

On August 30, the forces of Group Kovalenko were integrated into 1st Guards Army, which had been transferred to Stalingrad Front, but they had already suffered heavy losses in the fighting south and southeast of Kotluban between August 26–28; the 315th was down by about one-third of its initial strength. During a further assault by 1st Guards on September 3 the 724th Rifle Regiment penetrated the corridor and worked its way into the defense of the village of Orlovka, north-northwest of the city, coming under command of 62nd Army. As of September 11, this Army reported the 315th with a strength of 2,873 men, but as only one regiment of the division was under its command, this must refer to the 724th. By September 12, the remainder of the division, less the 724th, had been transferred to 24th Army, still north of the corridor. On the 16th, 62nd Army reported that the remnants of the 315th under its command were part of the Northern Combat Sector, and were continuing to defend their previous positions. The remaining men of the 724th were eventually incorporated into the 124th and 149th Rifle Brigades, which continued to hold their positions at Spartanovka for the duration of the battle.

Meanwhile, the rump 315th was transferred briefly to the Reserve of the Supreme High Command for rebuilding, then into the rear of Stalingrad Front on September 25, along with the rebuilding 87th Rifle Division, first to Kamyshin on the Volga and ultimately to the 10th Reserve Army, positioned 70 – 80 km southwest of Kamyshin. In late October these divisions were officially subordinated to 62nd Army, but they remained on the east bank as a strategic reserve. As the planning for Operation Uranus progressed, its starting date was postponed several times, in part due to delays in making these two divisions completely operational. Gen. G.K. Zhukov sent a message to the STAVKA on November 11 notifying that he was postponing the offensive until the 15th in part because:

"The two rifle divisions (the 87th and 315th) assigned to Yeryomenko... have still not entrained because they have not received transport and horses up to this time... dispatch the 87th and 315th Rifle Divisions as rapidly as possible..."

In the end, rail and road transport remained inadequate and major bottlenecks existed throughout the buildup; when the offensive finally opened on November 19, the two divisions, which were supposed to be in Stalingrad by this time, were stranded at the railroad station at Borisoglebsk.

When the division finally arrived near the front in the first days of December it was assigned to 51st Army in Stalingrad Front, south of the now-encircled 6th Army. Anticipating an attempt to break through to the encirclement, on December 8 the STAVKA ordered the formation of the new 5th Shock Army in the area of the confluence of the Don and Chir Rivers to counter any German offensive from the shorter western route, and the 315th was assigned to this Army. The assembly of 5th Shock went remarkably quickly, and by the end of the day on December 10 the division was taking up jumping-off positions on the east bank of the Don opposite Nizhne-Chirskaya. 5th Shock began its offensive on the 13th; the 315th cleared the enemy from the woods east of Verkhne-Chirski while 7th Tank Corps captured the vital strongpoint of Rychkovsky, which compromised the German bridgehead east of the Chir. On the following day the division seized a small bridgehead on the west bank of the Don. These actions, plus others by forces of 5th Shock, eliminated any threat of a German relief operation from the west.

The relief operation from the southwest, Operation Winter Storm, had been defeated by December 19. Three days previously, the Soviet forces launched Operation Little Saturn, which smashed the Italian 8th Army and began sweeping the Axis forces out of the Caucasus. In the last days of the month the 315th took part in the Tormosin Offensive Operation against the German Corps Mieth in the region between the lower Chir and the lower Don. The town of Tormosin fell to units of 2nd Guards Army on December 31, and 5th Shock continued driving westwards to the Donbas in early 1943.

== Into the Donbas and Ukraine ==
In January 1943, the 315th, along with the rest of 5th Shock Army, was reassigned to Southern Front. General Knyazev departed from the division and was replaced by Col. Dmitry Semyonovich Kuropatenko on February 4. Kuropatenko would be promoted to Major General on September 1. On February 18 the division was coming up against the Mius River, at Berestovo and Russkoe, facing the German defenses that had been built along that line a year earlier. The next day enemy counterattacks forced the division's units back to the eastern edge of Berestovo. Despite repeated efforts during the rest of the month to force the German line, only small bridgeheads were won, and the fighting stalled on the Mius until July.

On July 17 the commander of Southern Front, Col. Gen. F. I. Tolbukhin, launched a new assault across the Mius with 5th Shock and 2nd Guards Armies, backed by two mechanized corps and supported by an attack from the 44th Army. Seven rifle divisions, including the 315th, were committed against the boundary of the 294th and 306th Infantry Divisions of XVII Army Corps. Under the weight of massive artillery and air attack the German forces suffered serious casualties, and the Soviet divisions soon won a bridgehead as much as 4 km deep. On the morning of the 18th the German commander threw in his only mobile reserve, 16th Panzergrenadier Division, which made no progress and lost 20 tanks. By the end of the day the Soviet bridgehead was 30 km deep and 45 km wide, but German reserves were approaching.

After the Red Army offensive came to a standstill, those armored reserves launched Operation Roland at 0810 hrs. on July 30. While the 2nd SS Panzer Corps made a poor showing against the main part of the Soviet bridgehead, the supporting attack by XXIV Panzer Corps against the 315th was much more successful due to neglect of the most basic defensive precautions. Most of the division was encircled by 1145 hrs. 3,000 men were lost as prisoners, and the entire left flank of the bridgehead was destabilized.

In August the division went into the 54th Rifle Corps in 51st Army, still in Southern Front, which became 4th Ukrainian Front on October 20. Three days later, the 315th was granted the honorific "Melitopol" for its role in the liberation of that city:

"MELITOPOL" - ...315th Rifle Division (Major General Kuropatenko, Dmitrii Semyonovich)... The troops who participated in the liberation of Melitopol, by the order of the Supreme High Command of October 23, 1943, and a commendation in Moscow, are given a salute of 20 artillery salvoes from 224 guns."

== Crimean Campaign ==
54th Corps moved to 2nd Guards Army in February 1944, and the 315th took part in the liberation of the Crimea in April - May 1944. In recognition of its success in the Perekop and Sivash operations the 315th was awarded the Order of the Red Banner on April 24. In late May, after the Crimea was cleared of the enemy, the division was transferred to the Separate Coastal Army, where it remained for the duration of the war on garrison duty under the Reserve of the Supreme High Command. On November 2, Col. Askanaz Georgievich Karapetian was promoted to the rank of Major General, and he would hold this command until the end of hostilities. At the end of the war, the official title of the division was 315th Rifle, Melitopol, Order of the Red Banner Division. (Russian: 315-я стрелковая Мелитопольская Краснознамённая дивизия.)

== Postwar ==
The division was garrisoning Kerch by the end of the war. By the spring of 1947, the division had become the 7th Separate Rifle Brigade, part of the Tauric Military District. In December 1951, the 7th Brigade was expanded to reform the 315th Division. In 1955, the division was redesignated the 52nd Rifle Division. On 4 April 1956, the district headquarters was converted into the 45th Rifle Corps, of which the division became part. In 1957, the division became the 52nd Motor Rifle Division, and the corps became the 45th Army Corps. In March 1967, the corps headquarters was transferred to Bikin, and 52 MRD, remaining in the Crimea, was subordinated to the new 32nd Army Corps.

The division was transferred to Nizhneudinsk in the Transbaikal Military District in April 1969. However, its 91st Motor Rifle Regiment was left in Crimea to become the base for the 157th Motor Rifle Division. The division, along with two others moved from European Russia, formed the nucleus of the new 29th Army. The new 459th Motor Rifle Regiment replaced the 91st MRR. On 1 December 1987, the division became the 978th Territorial Training Center. On 1 July 1990, it became the 5208th Weapons and Equipment Storage Base. The storage base was disbanded in 1994.
