= Kullavere (river) =

River in Estonia

Kullavere River
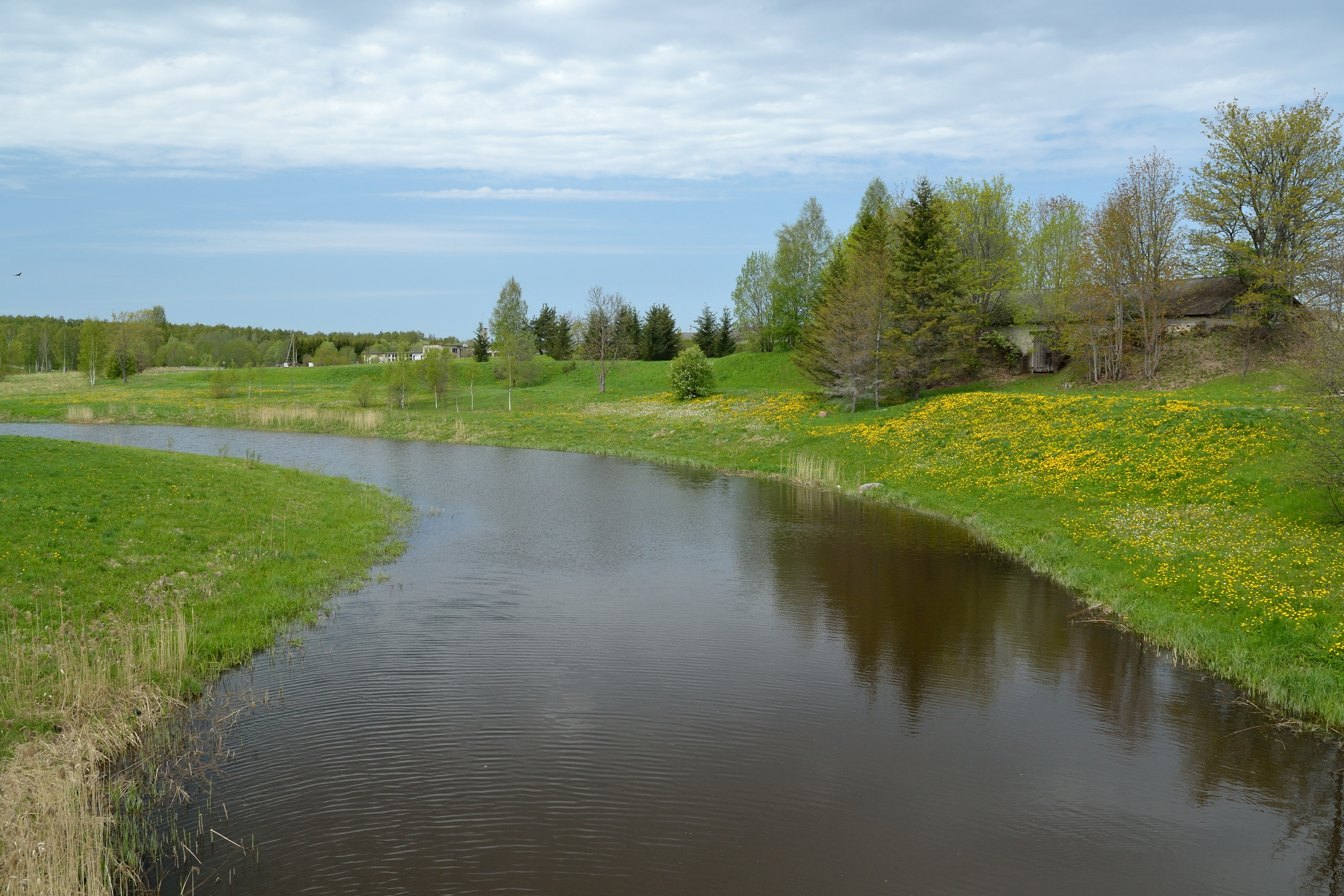

Location
- Country: Estonia

Physical characteristics
- Mouth: Lake Peipus
  - coordinates: 58°46′52″N 26°58′48″E
- Length: 59.1 km
- Basin size: 629.3 km²

The Kullavere River (also Omedu River) is a river in Estonia in Jõgeva and Tartu County. The river is 59.1 km long and basin size is 629.3 km^{2}. It empties into Lake Peipus.
