= Mikhail Shumilov =

Soviet general, Hero of the Soviet Union (1895–1975)

Mikhail Stepanovich Shumilov
- Михаил Степанович Шумилов
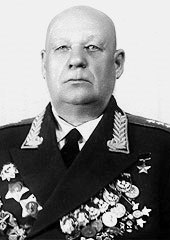
- Born: 17 November 1895; Verchne Tečenskoe, Perm Governorate, Russian Empire (today Kataysky District, Kurgan Oblast)
- Died: 28 June 1975 (aged 79); Moscow, Russian SFSR, Soviet Union
- Military career
- Allegiance: Russian Empire; Soviet Union
- Service years: 1917–1956
- Rank: Colonel General
- Commands: 11th Rifle Corps; 64th Army; 7th Guards Army; 13th Army; White Sea Military District; Voronezh Military District
- Conflicts: World War I; Russian Civil War; World War II; Soviet invasion of Poland; Winter War; Operation Barbarossa; Battle of Stalingrad; Battle of Kursk; Kirovograd Offensive; Uman–Botoșani Offensive; Second Jassy–Kishinev Offensive; Battle of Debrecen; Budapest Offensive; Bratislava–Brno Offensive; Prague Offensive
- Awards: Hero of the Soviet Union; Order of Lenin

Mikhail Stepanovich Shumilov (Russian: Михаил Степанович Шумилов; November 17, 1895 – June 28, 1975) was a Soviet colonel general and commander of the 64th Army during the Battle of Stalingrad. There he defended the southern outskirts of the city and the bridgehead of Beketovka on the Volga for more than six months.

== Biography ==
Shumilov fought in World War I, and commanded a regiment of the Red Army during the Russian Civil War.

In April 1938, he was appointed commander of the 11th Rifle Corps, stationed in the Belorussian Military District. He took part in the Soviet invasion of Poland and the Soviet-Finnish War. In July 1940, the 11th Rifle Corps was incorporated into the Baltic Special Military District.

After his corps was destroyed in Operation Barbarossa, Shumilov was relieved of command in August 1941 and put into the reserve. He was recalled in January 1942 and served as deputy commanding officer of the 21st Army until August 1942, when he became commander of the 64th Army, at the start of the Battle of Stalingrad.

For about a month his army held back the 4th Panzer Army, under the command of Hermann Hoth, on the southern approach to Stalingrad, so that industrial enterprises in the north of the city continued to operate. For six months Shumilov's army held the southern part of Stalingrad in fierce battles, playing an outstanding role in the heroic defense of the city along with the 62nd Army of General Vasily Chuikov.
On January 31, 1943, Mikhail Shumilov led the interrogation of Field Marshal Friedrich Paulus, who was captured by the 64th Army near Stalingrad.

He remained at the head of his army, which was renamed the 7th Guards Army in April 1943, until the end of the war.
He participated in the Battle of Kursk, forcing the Dnieper River, the Kirovograd Offensive, the Uman–Botoșani Offensive, the Second Jassy–Kishinev Offensive, the Battle of Debrecen, the Budapest Offensive, the Bratislava–Brno Offensive and the Prague Offensive.
General Shumilov also was involved in the creation of the new Romanian army.

By decree of the Presidency of the Supreme Council of the USSR of October 26, 1943 for the skilful leadership of military units during the forcing of Dnipro and the personal courage and heroism of the Guard, Colonel-General Mikhail Stepanovich Shumilov was named Hero of the Soviet Union and awarded the Order of Lenin.

In 1946, he became commanding officer of the 13th Army, in 1948 commander in chief of the White Sea Military District and in 1949 commander in chief of the Voronezh Military District, until 1956 when he retired.

== Monuments ==
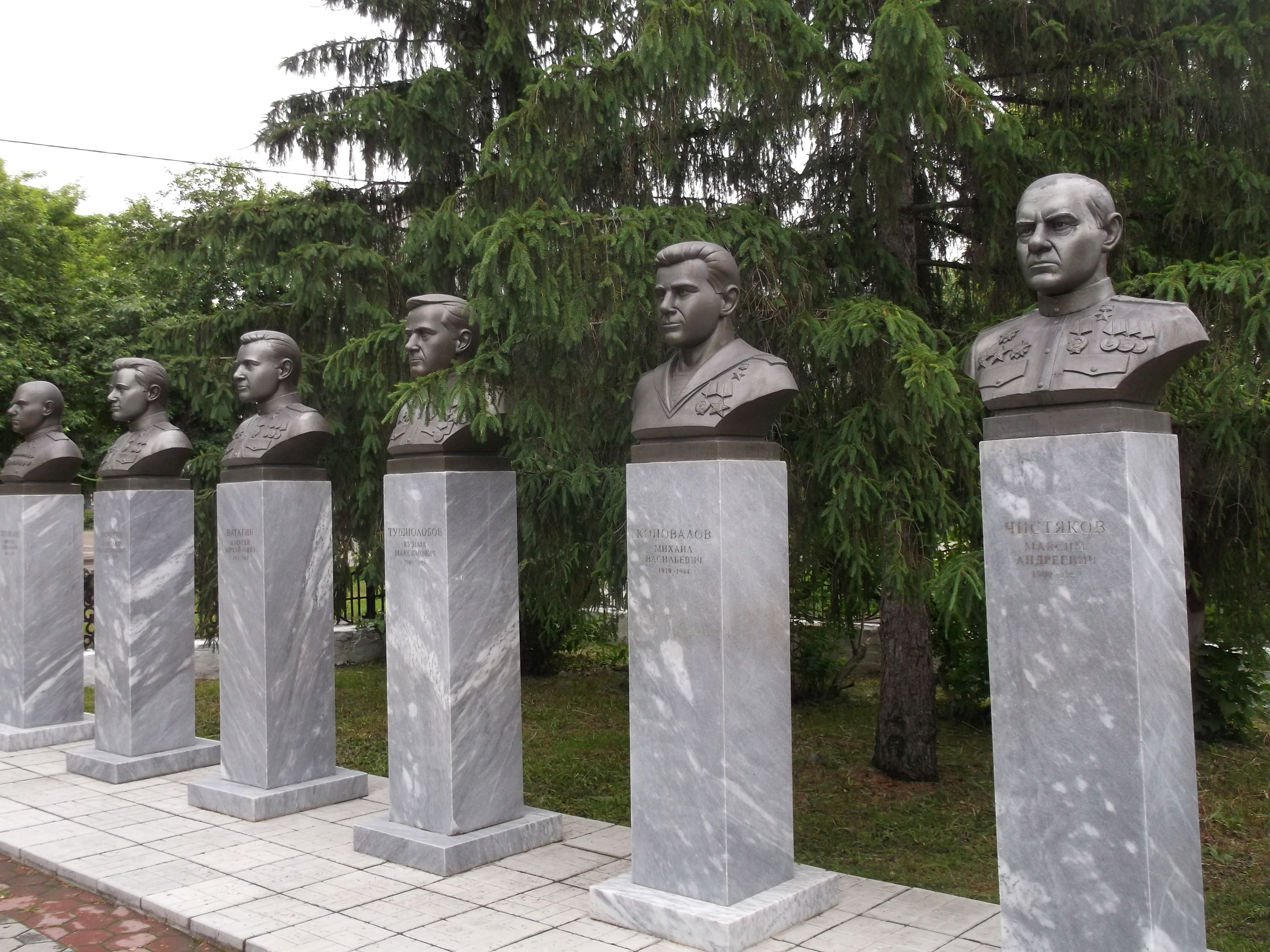
Monument to 6 heroes in Kataysk, Kurgan

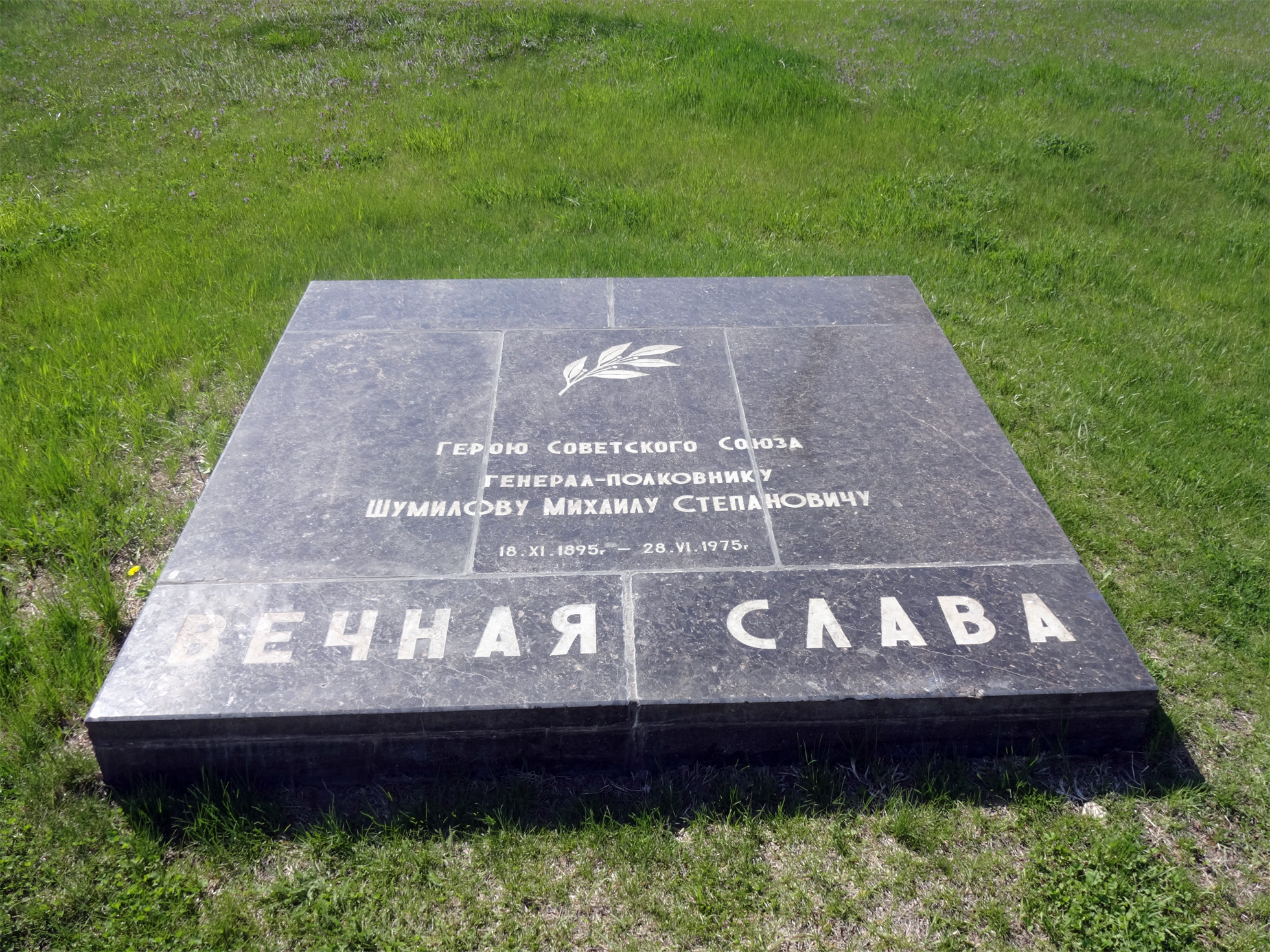
Memorial plate in Mamayev, Kurgan

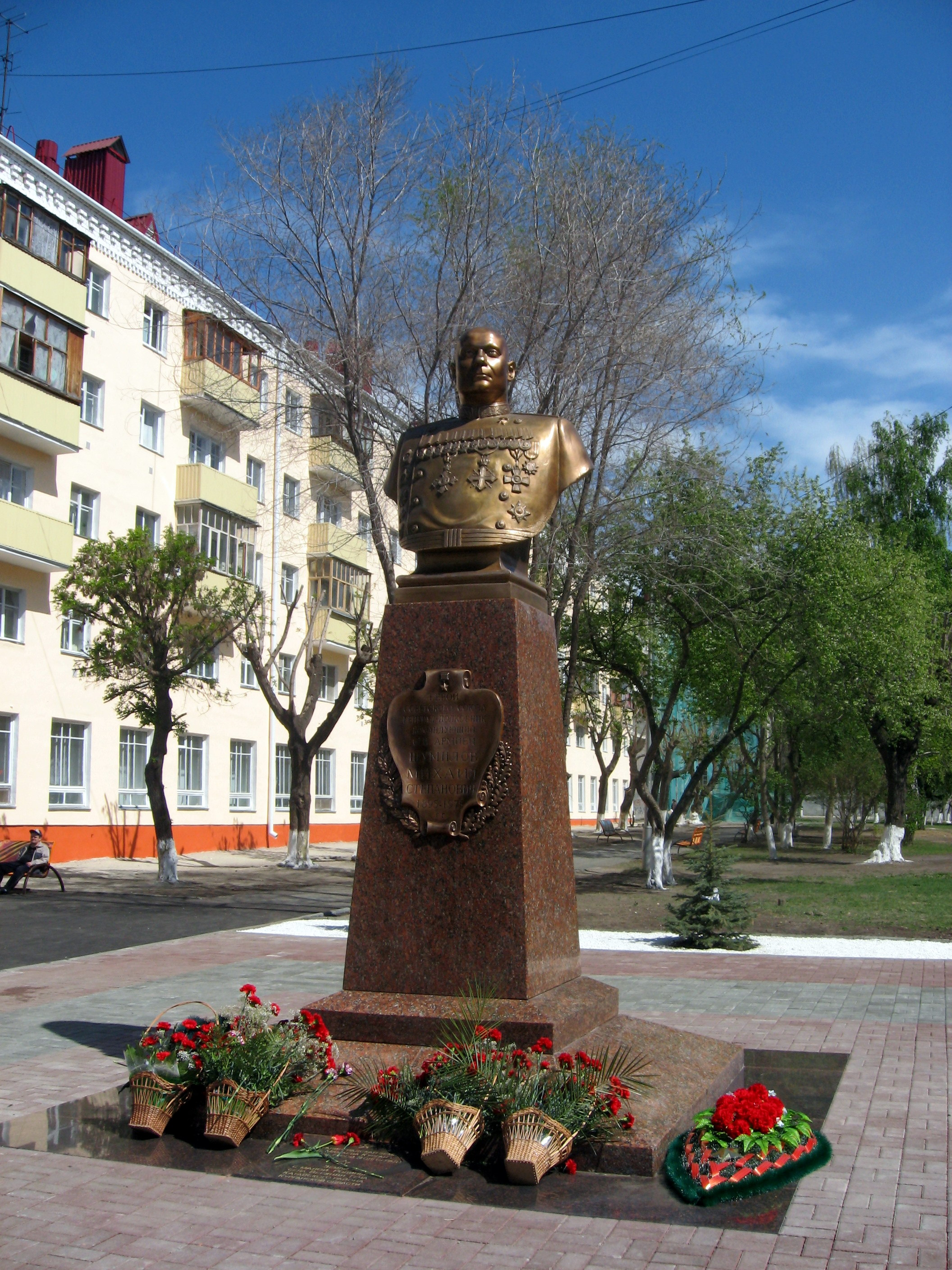
Monument in Kurgan

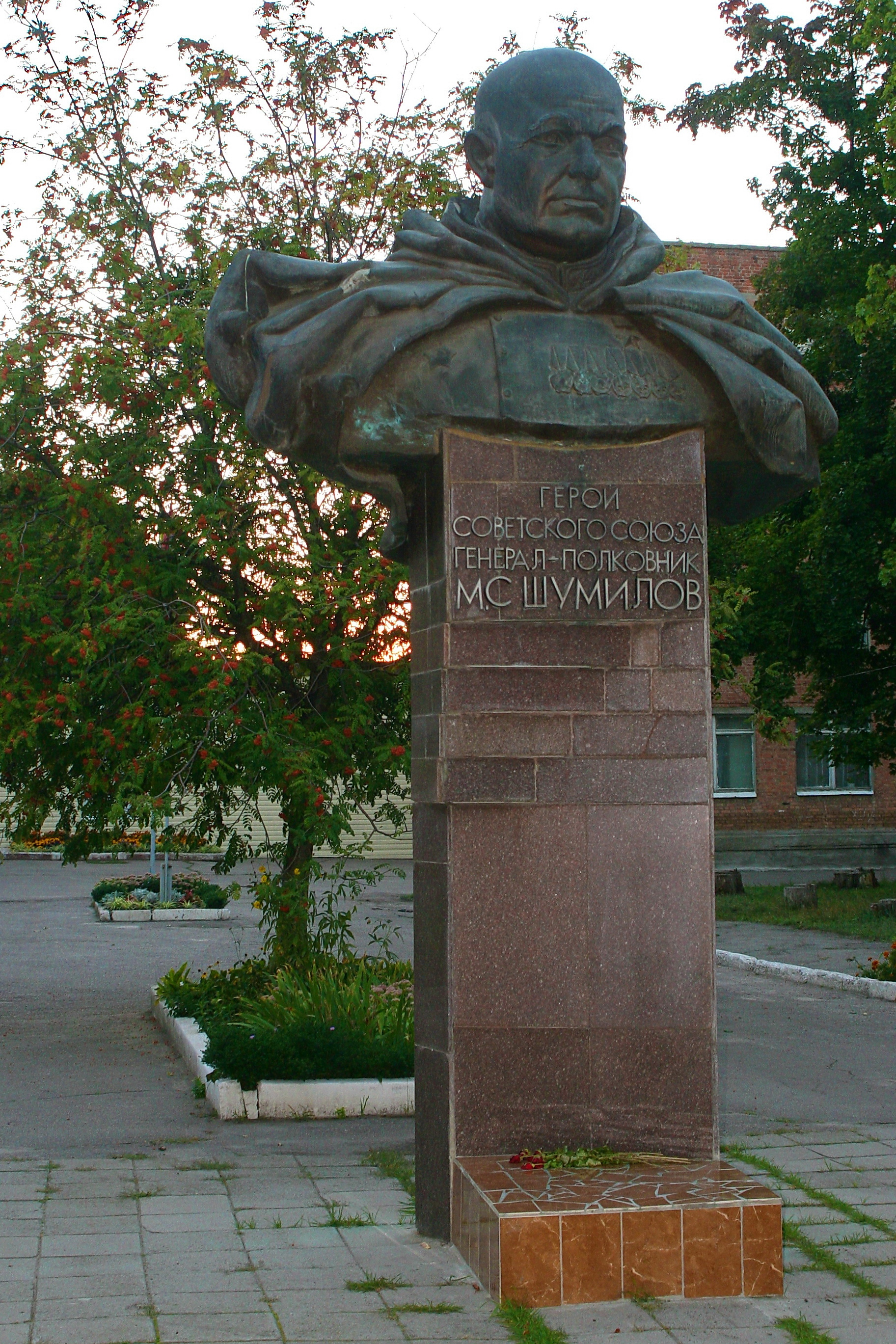
Monument in Kharkiv

== Sources ==
- generals.dk
