= 99th Rifle Division =

Soviet Red Army formation

- Active: 1924 – April 1943; May 1943 – 1946
- Country: Soviet Union
- Branch: Red Army
- Type: Infantry
- Engagements: World War II
- Decorations: Order of the Red Banner; Order of Suvorov
- Battle honours: Battle of Uman; Battle of Stalingrad

Commanders
- Notable commanders: Andrey Vlasov

The 99th Rifle Division (Russian: 99-я стрелковая дивизия 99-ya strelkovaya diviziya) was an infantry division of the Soviet Union's Red Army which fought in World War II. It was first formed in 1924, destroyed, reformed and raised to Guards status, and then reformed once again.

== First formation ==
It was first formed in April 1924 at Cherkassy in the Ural MD on the basis of the 44th Rifle Division as the 99th (territorial) Rifle Division. In 1926 it consisted of the 295th, 296th, and 297th Rifle Regiments. In 1931 it was translated(transferred) on a personnel basis.

In 1939 it took part in the Soviet invasion of Poland as part of the 13th Rifle Corps, 12th Army, Ukrainian Front. On 29 September 1939 the division entered Przemyśl. Recognised as one of the best divisions in the Army under Andrey Vlasov's command in 1940. On 22 June 1941 it was serving with 8th Rifle Corps, 26th Army, Southwestern Front, and participated in a counterstroke at Przemyśl (Перемышль).

During the German-Soviet War, on 27 June 1941 the division left Przemyśl for Нижанковичи, Рудня, Комарно, Nikolaev, and then Vinnitsa. On 22 July 1941 the division was awarded the Order of the Red Banner for its actions at Przemyśl. In the Uman encirclement in July–August 1941, most of the division was lost or was taken prisoner, with only a part of the division artillery and rear services avoiding capture; in total, from the Uman 'kessel' only about two thousand soldiers broke free, though carrying with them the divisional banner, and also the banners of its units.

On 1 May 1942 the division was part of the 57th Army alongside the 14th Guards Rifle Division, 150th, 317th, and 351st Rifle Divisions preparing to fight what became the Second Battle of Kharkov. During the battle the division was practically wiped out at Izyum in mid-May 1942, when it was surrounded at Barvenkovo (place), with only 1067 of the unit's personnel managing to evade capture. From 8 to 15 June 1942 the division was transferred out of the Southern Front, and from the Redkovskiye Peski area the division was sent to Balashov to be reorganised. During this period it was part of the 6th Reserve Army. From 10 July 1942 the division was transferred to the 8th Reserve Army, though it may have stayed at Balashov, reforming, until as late as August 1942. The division then fought at Stalingrad. On 1 September 1942 the division was part of the 66th Army, preparing for its part in Operation Uranus, and 1 December 1942 the division was still with the 66th Army but the Army had been transferred from the Stalingrad Front to the Don Front.

By 10 March 1943, as part of the 62nd Army the division was loaded on a train at station Panshino and sent to the disposition of the Southwestern Front at Dvurechnaya station (literally two-rivers). On 18 April 1943 it became the 88th Guards Rifle Division.

== 2nd formation ==
The division was recreated from 99th Rifle Brigade in May 1943. Fought near Zhitomir and in Carpathians. With 46th Army of the 2nd Ukrainian Front 5.45. The division was withdrawn to Dubăsari in the Odessa Military District with the 10th Guards Rifle Corps by spring 1946, where it was reduced to the 37th Separate Rifle Brigade. The latter was soon disbanded in December 1946.

== Awards and honours ==
The division won four awards and an honorific title. On 22 July 1941 the division was awarded the Order of the Red Banner for its fighting at Przemyśl. On 14 October 1943 the division was awarded the honourable name "Zaporozhye". On 19 September 1944 it was awarded the Order of Bogdan Khmelnitsky. On 9 August 1944 it was awarded the Order of Suvorov, and on 26 May 1945 the Order of Lenin. On 18 May 1945, its commander, Colonel Derzian, decorated members of Major General Paul's 26th Infantry Division in Upper Austria "for illustrious fulfillment of battle orders of the Command in the war against the German invader".
