= 45th Army Corps =

- Country: Russian Empire
- Allegiance: Imperial Russian Army
- Engagements: World War I

The 45th Army Corps was an Army corps in the Imperial Russian Army.

== Part of ==
- 11th Army: 1916
- 9th Army: 1917
- 5th Army: 1917
