= 157th Motor Rifle Division =

Motor rifle division of the Soviet military

- Active: 1969–1987
- Country: Soviet Union
- Branch: Soviet Army
- Type: Motorized infantry
- Garrison/HQ: Feodosia

The 157th Motor Rifle Division was a motorized infantry division of the Soviet Army, active from 1969 to 1987. Stationed in Feodosia in the Crimean Oblast, it was part of the 32nd Army Corps. The division primarily served in a training and mobilization capacity, maintaining a low peacetime strength of 17% during the Cold War.

== History ==
In April 1969, the 157th Motor Rifle Division was activated in Feodosiya as part of the 32nd Army Corps. It replaced the 52nd Motor Rifle Division, which had been moved to Nizhneudinsk. During the Cold War, the division was maintained at 17% strength. On 1 December 1987, it became the 710th Territorial Training Center. On 1 September 1989, the training center became the 5378th Weapons and Equipment Storage Base.

== Composition ==
In 1980, the division included the following units.

- 91st Motorized Rifle Regiment (Feodosiya, Crimean Oblast)
- 520th Motorized Rifle Regiment (Feodosiya, Crimean Oblast)
- 524th Motorized Rifle Regiment (Kerch, Crimean Oblast)
- Tank Regiment (Feodosiya, Crimean Oblast)
- 434th Artillery Regiment (Kerch, Crimean Oblast)
- Anti-Aircraft Artillery Regiment (Feodosiya, Crimean Oblast)
- Separate Missile Battalion (Feodosiya, Crimean Oblast)
- Separate Anti-Tank Artillery Battalion (Feodosiya, Crimean Oblast)
- Separate Reconnaissance Battalion (Feodosiya, Crimean Oblast)
- Separate Engineer-Sapper Battalion (Kerch, Crimean Oblast)
- Separate Communications Battalion (Feodosiya, Crimean Oblast)
- Separate Chemical Defence Company (Feodosiya, Crimean Oblast)
- Separate Equipment Maintenance and Recovery Battalion (Feodosiya, Crimean Oblast)
- Separate Medical Battalion (Feodosiya, Crimean Oblast)
- Separate Material Supply Battalion (Feodosiya, Crimean Oblast)
