= 10th Guards Budapest Rifle Corps =

The 10th Guards Budapest Rifle Corps was a unit of the Soviet Red Army during the Eastern Front of World War II. It traces its history to the 3rd Guards Rifle Corps, originally activated in January 1942, which was redesignated the 10th Guards Rifle Corps on 13 August 1942.

By Transcaucasian Front Order No. 00169 dated 3 August 1942, the corps began to form. The formation of the corps took place in the first half of August 1942 in the Makhachkala area from the previously completed 4th, 5th, 6th and 7th Guards Rifle Brigades (later to be expanded into 108th, 109th, and 110th Guards Rifle Divisions). On 13 August 1942, the 3rd Guards Rifle Corps was renamed to the 10th Guards Rifle Corps. It took part in the Dnieper–Carpathian Offensive as part of the 5th Shock Army, 3rd Ukrainian Front. They also took part in the Budapest Offensive as part of the 46th Army. Later, it became part of the Odessa Military District.

The 99th Rifle Division (2nd Formation) was withdrawn to Dubăsari in Moldova (Odessa Military District) with the Corps by spring 1946, where it was reduced to the 37th Separate Rifle Brigade. The latter was soon disbanded in December 1946.

In 1948, the 10th Guards Rifle Corps was part of 4th Guards Army, alongside 24th Guards Rifle Corps and 82nd Rifle Corps. It was made up of 33rd Guards Mechanized Division, 59th Guards RD, and 86th Guards Rifle Divisions. 86 GRD was still with it in 1955. By the time of its disestablishment it had been assigned the Military Unit Number No. 69651.

The corps was disestablished by being redesignated the 14th Guards Army on 25 November 1956 in Kishinev.

== Commanders ==
- Feofan Parkhomenko (8 August 1942 – 13 August 1942), Guards Major General;
- Ivan Terentyevich Zamertsev (13 August 1942 – 11 September 1942), Guards Major General;
- Ivan Alexandrovich Sevastyanov (15 September 1942 – 10 November 1942), guard colonel;
- Vasily Glagolev (11 November 1942 – 11 February 1943), guard colonel, guard major general;
- Pavel Gavrilovich Petrov (10 February 1943 – 20 February 1943), Guard Colonel, acting;
- Ivan Rubanyuk (12 February 1943 – April 1947), Guard Major General, Guard Lieutenant General [10] [11];
- Semyon Kozak (April 1947 – July 1950), Guard Lieutenant General;
- Pavel Nikonovich Bibikov (April 1951 – July 1953), Guard Major General;
- Efim Vasilievich Ryzhikov (July 1953 – 11 June 1956), Guard Lieutenant General;
- Konstantin Fedorovich Mayorov (12 June 1956 – 15 November 1956), Guard Major General.
