= Odessa Military District =

Military district of the Russian Empire and Soviet Union

- Boundaries of the Odessa Military District (in red) on 1 January 1989
- Active: 1862 - 1998
- Country: Russian Empire (1862 - 1918); Soviet Union (1939 - 1941), (1944 - 1991); Ukraine (1991 - 1998); Moldova (1991 - 1992)
- Type: Military district
- Headquarters: Odessa (now Odesa)
- Engagements: Invasion of Poland (selected units), Invasion of Romania, World War II

Commanders
- Notable commanders: Georgy Zhukov (06/1946 - 02/1948)

The Odessa Military District (Russian: Одесский военный округ, ОВО; Ukrainian: Червонопрапорний Одеський військовий округ, romanized: Chervonoprapornyi Odeskyi viiskovyi okruh, lit. 'Red Banner Odesa Military District', abbreviated ОдВО, OdVO) was a military administrative division of the Armed Forces of Ukraine. This district consisted of Moldavia and five Ukrainian oblasts of Odesa (then spelled Odessa), Mykolaiv, Kherson, Crimea and Zaporizhzhia. In 1998 most of its territory was transformed into the Southern Operational Command.

The district was originally established by the Soviet Armed Forces, and then was inherited by Ukraine. As the Soviet Union dissolved, the district's 14th Guards Army was split three ways. The army headquarters and some of its forces, stationed in Transnistria, as well as the 59th Guards Motor Rifle Division, came under the jurisdiction of Russia - the rest were divided between Ukraine and the Armed Forces of Moldova.

An earlier district of the same name was established in 1864 by the Imperial Russian Army.

== History ==
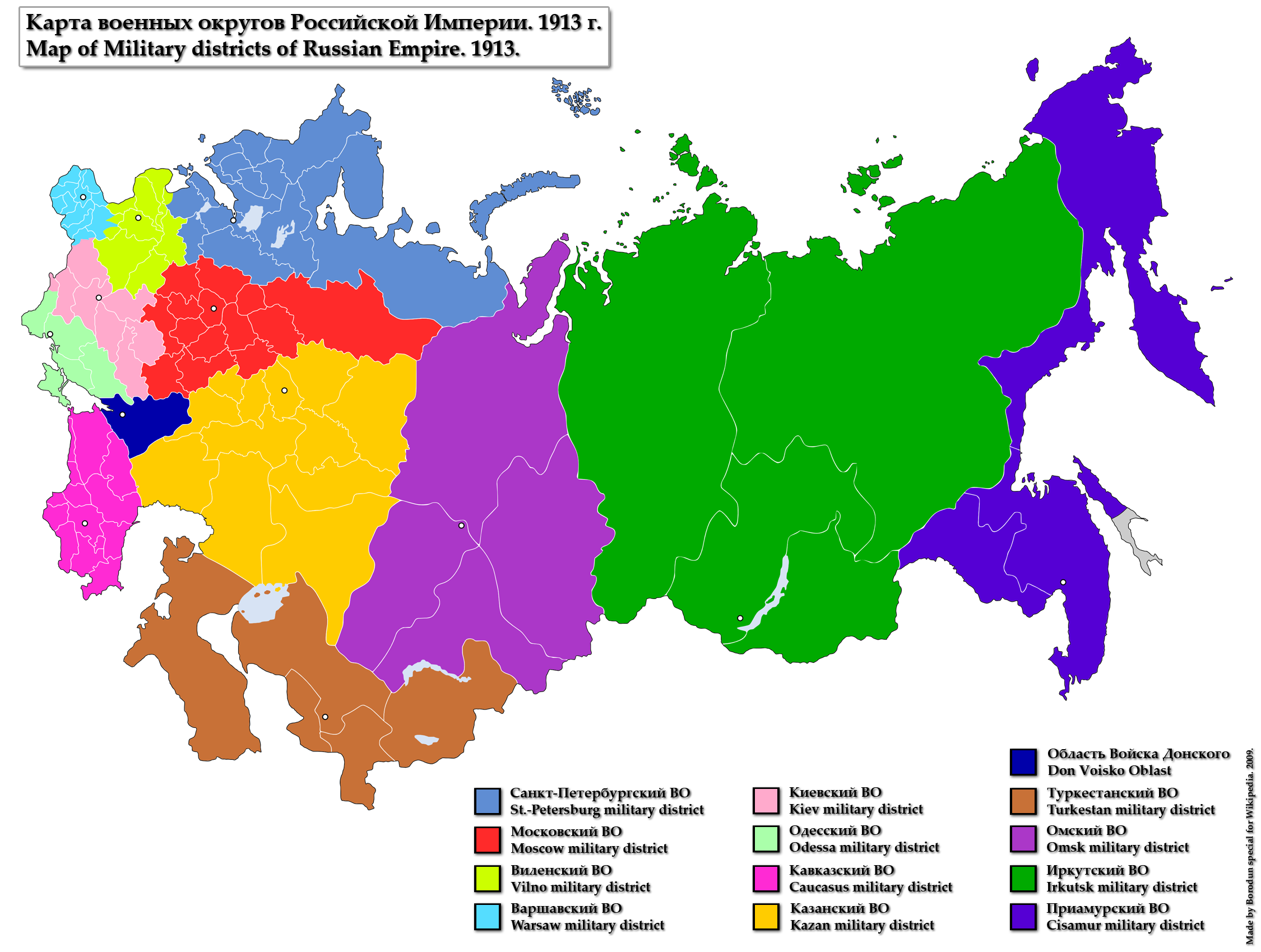
Map of military districts in 1913. OVO is in light green color on the far-left

=== Years of existence ===
- December 24, 1862 – January 1918 Russian Empire, transformed into headquarters of Romanian Front
- April 9 – August 5, 1919 Russian SFSR, dissolved, remnants transferred to 12th Army
- October 11, 1939 – September 10, 1941 Soviet Union, dissolved remnants transferred to Southern Front
- March 23, 1944 – January 3, 1992 Soviet Union, passed on to Armed Forces of Ukraine
  - July 9, 1945 – April 4, 1956, portion of territory was under jurisdiction of Tauric Military District
- January 3, 1992 – January 3, 1998 Ukraine, transformed into Southern Operational Command

=== Russian Empire ===
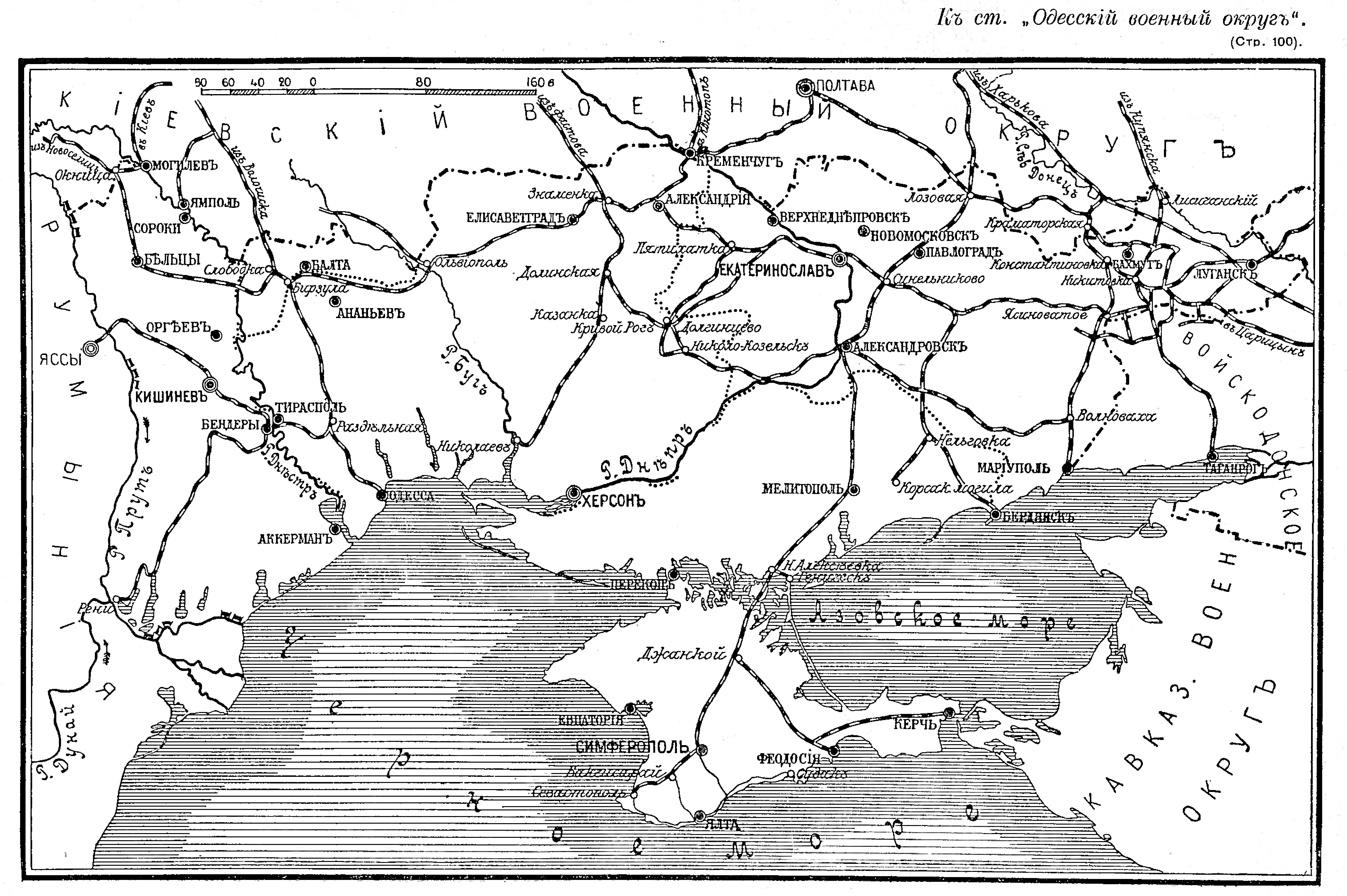
Odessa Military District

The Odessa Military District was established during the reforms of the Russian military minister Dmitry Milyutin. It was the second of two districts on the territory of the future Ukraine, the other being Kiev Military District. OVO existed from 1862–1918 as part of the Imperial Russian Armed Forces. It encompassed the territories of Kherson, Yekaterinoslav, Tauride, and Bessarabia guberniyas. The district bordered Kingdom of Romania, Kiev Military District, Don Voisko Oblast, and Black Sea. In the 1870s and 1880s (until August 12, 1889) the Commander of the district served as the interim Governor General of Odesa city (then spelled Odessa) concurrently. In January 1918 the Odessa Military District headquarters was transformed into the headquarters of the Soviet Romanian Front under the jurisdiction of Rumcherod. With the establishment of the Ukrainian government on its territory, it was terminated. OVO was reinstated as the Ukrainian forces were pushed out the area in April to August 1919.

=== Soviet Union ===
The district was reformed by the decision of October 11, 1939 specifically for the occupation of Bessarabia after the Soviet Union signed Molotov–Ribbentrop Pact. At that time its territory included the newly created Moldovian SSR, six oblasts of the Ukrainian SSR (Izmail, Odesa (then Odessa), Dnipropetrovsk, Zaporizhzhia, Mykolaiv, Kirovohrad) and also the Crimean Autonomous Soviet Socialist Republic as part of the Russian SFSR. The Odessa MD was reinforced by several units from the Ukrainian Front that took part in the Soviet invasion of Poland and Romania, previously formed on base of the Odessa Army Group of the Kiev Special Military District (reformed Kiev Military District).

By directives OV/583 and OV/584 of the Soviet People's Commissariat of Defense, units of the Odessa Military District, currently commanded by Mjr. Gen. I.V. Boldin, were ordered into battle ready state in the spring of 1940. Soviet troop concentrations along the Romanian border took place between April 15 and June 10, 1940. In order to coordinate the efforts of the Kiev and Odessa Military districts in the preparation of action against Romania, the Soviet Army created the Southern Front under General Georgy Zhukov, composed of the 5th, 9th and 12th Armies. The Southern Front had 32 infantry divisions, 2 motorized infantry divisions, 6 cavalry divisions, 11 tank brigades, 3 paratrooper brigades, 30 artillery regiments, and smaller auxiliary units.

Two action plans were devised. The first plan was prepared for the case that Romania would not accept to evacuate Bessarabia and Bukovina. The Soviet 12th Army was supposed in such a situation to strike Southward along the Prut river towards Iași, while Soviet 9th Army was supposed to strike East-to-West south of Chișinău towards Huși. The target of this plan was to surround the Romanian troops in the Bălți-Iași area. The second plan took into consideration the case that Romania would succumb to Soviet demands and would evacuate its military. In such a situation, Soviet troops were given the mission to reach quickly the Prut river, and take charge of the evacuation process of the Romanian troops. The first plan was taken as the basis of action. Along the portions where the offensive was supposed to take place, Soviets prepared to have at least a triple superiority of men and means.

On June 22, 1941 primary combat formations included:

- 9th Army was relocated to the District as 9th Separate Army in June 1941 from the Leningrad Military District after the Winter War and invasion of Romania
- 2nd Mechanised Corps and 18th Mechanised Corps were associated with 9th Army.
- 7th Rifle Corps was formed in the District in June 1941,
- 9th Rifle Corps formed as part of the District on June 22, 1941,
- 3rd Airborne Corps

In August 1941 51st Independent Army was formed in the Crimea.

On September 10, 1941 the district was abolished as it was overran by the Armed Forces of Nazi Germany and its allies.

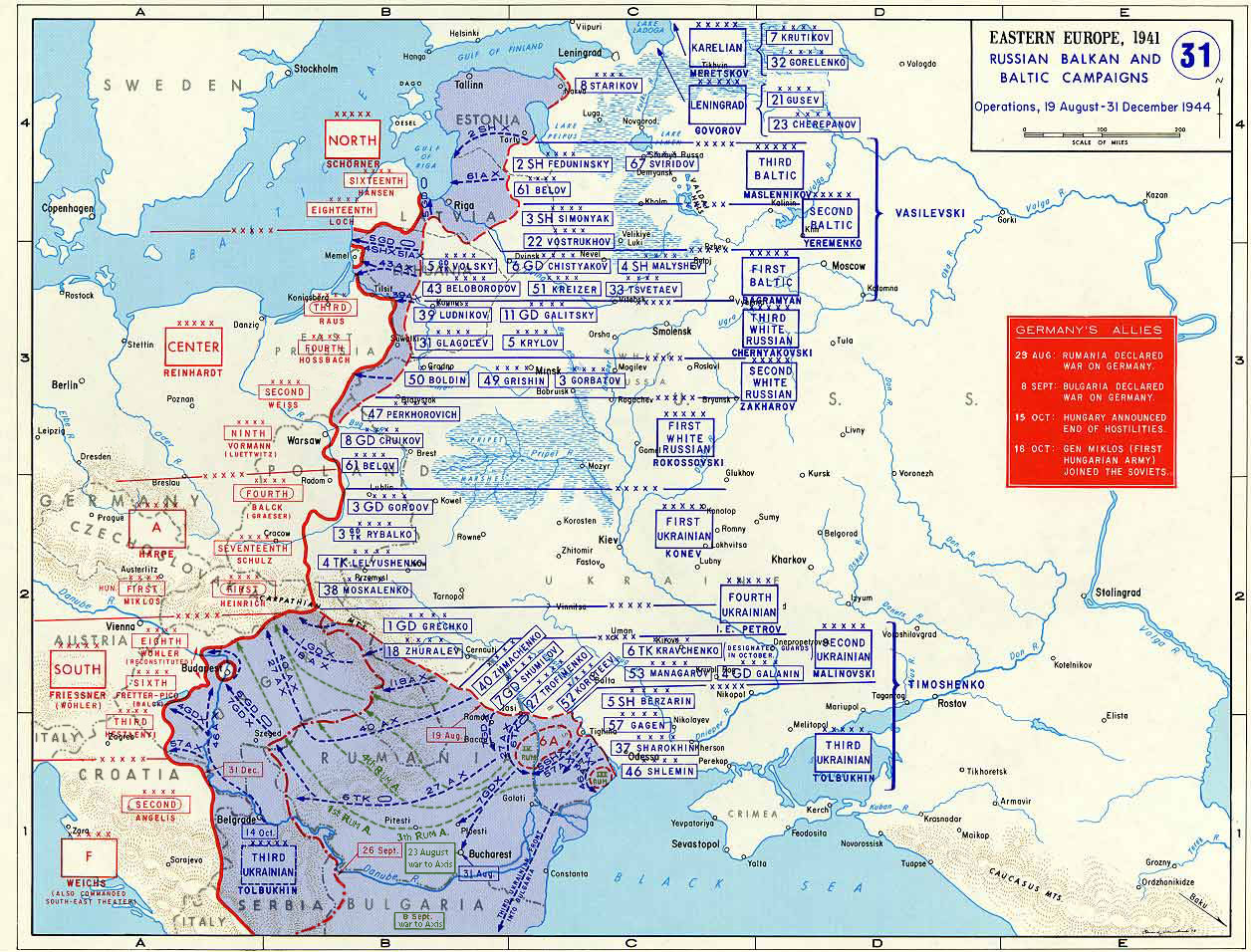
Soviet Operations 19 August to 31 December 1944

== Post World War II Development ==
The District was reformed on April 23, 1944 with its headquarters at Kirovohrad, which in October 1944 relocated to Odesa. In 1948, 4th Guards Army, with 10th Guards Budapest Rifle Corps (33rd Mech, 59, 86) and 24th Guards Rifle Corps (35 Guards Mech, 180th Rifle Division, 51 Ind Rifle Brigade), plus 82nd Rifle Corps (34th Guards Mech, 28th Guards Rifle, 52 Ind Rifle Brigade) were in the district.

Marshal of the Soviet Union, Giorgi Zhukov was assigned command of the Odessa Military District after the war, far from Moscow and lacking in strategic significance and troops. He arrived there on 13 June 1945. Zhukov suffered a heart attack in January 1948, spending a month in hospital. In February 1948, Zhukov was moved to another secondary posting, this time command of the Urals Military District. General Colonel Nikolay Pukhov took command.

82nd Rifle Corps existed until 13 June 1955, when it was renamed 25th Rifle Corps, and 25.6.57 it was renamed 25th Army Corps. HQ in Nikolayev with the 28th Guards Motor Rifle Division, 34th Guards MRD and 95th MRD in the late 1950s. Disbanded in June 1960.

In May 1955 the district's forces included the 10th Guards Budapest Rifle Corps (35th, 59th Guards, 86th Guards Rifle Division), 25th Rifle Corps (including the 20th Rifle Division (Zaporozhia), and 28th Guards RDs) and 32nd Rifle Corps, and the 48th, and 66th Guards Rifle Divisions. In May 1957 the 20th Rifle Division became the 93rd Motor Rifle Division, but the division was disbanded in March 1959.

In 1960 the 113th Guards Motor Rifle Division and 95th Motor Rifle Division were disbanded.

In April 1960 the Odessa Military District consisted of three oblasts (Mykolaiv Oblast, Izmail Oblast and Odesa Oblast) as well as the Moldavian SSR and the three new oblasts from the disbanded Tavria Military District: Zaporizhzhia Oblast, Crimean Oblast, and Kherson Oblast.

From September 1984 the District came under command of the South-Western Strategic Direction, with its headquarters at Chișinău.

== Later developments ==
In the Odessa District's territory were additionally deployed the 14th Guards Army (created on the basis of 10th Guards Budapest Rifle Corps), the 32nd Army Corps (possibly reformed on the basis of the headquarters units of the former Tauric Military District) in 1956, complemented by the 98th Guards Airborne Division as well as seven additional motor rifle divisions.

The 5th Air Army of the Soviet Air Forces provided tactical air support for the District's units and the 49th Air Defence Corps, 8th Air Defence Army was tasked with national air defence for the territory.

The Odessa Military District was transferred to the jurisdiction of Ukraine after the dissolution of the Soviet Union on January 3, 1992 at 18:00. William E. Odom says that 'in accordance with the Minsk agreements [from the CIS summit in Minsk of 30–31 December 1991], Shaposhnikov sent an order on 3 January 1992, formally transferring conventional forces to Ukraine. President Kravchuk then approved the firing of the three military district commanders (..). On 7–8 January each were removed, none resisting because within their headquarters Kravchuk's people had quietly created a network of officers loyal to his government.'

Its units were split between the Armed Forces of Ukraine and some units, mostly from the 14th Guards Army, in the former Moldovian SSR that became part of the Armed Forces of the Russian Federation.

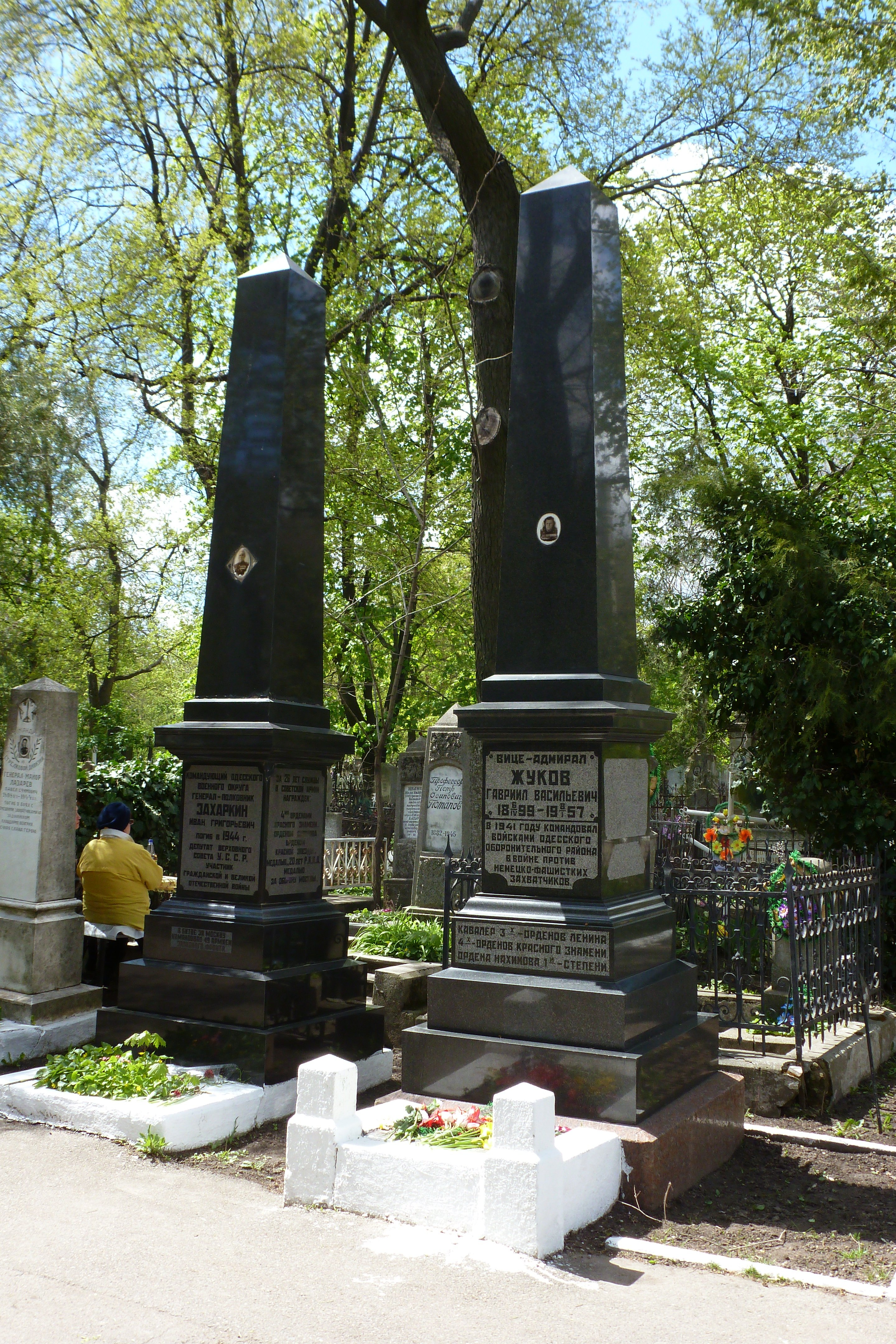
The tombstone of General Colonel Ivan Zakharkin (on the left) on the Second Christian Cemetery in Odesa

== Commanders ==
=== Commanders 1862-1914 ===
- Paul Demetrius von Kotzebue Count, General of Infantry (12.12.1862 — 11.01.1874)
- Vladimir Savvich Semeka, Adjutant General, Lieutenant General (11.01.1874 — 01.04.1879)
- Eduard Totleben, Count, Adjutant General, Engineer General, Interim Governor General (01.04.1879 — 18.05.1880)
- Alexander Drenteln Adjutant General, General of Infantry, Interim Governor General (18.05.1880 — 14.01.1881)
- Alexander Mikhailovich Dondukov-Korsakov Prince, General of the Cavalry, Adjutant General, Interim Governor General (14.01.1881 — 01.01.1882)
- Iosif Gurko Adjutant-General, General of the Cavalry, Interim Governor-General (09.01.1882 — 07.07.1883)
- Christopher Roop General of Infantry, Provisional Governor General (21.10.1883 — 12.10.1890)
- Alexander Ivanovich Musin-Pushkin, Count, General of the Cavalry (23.10.1890 — 19.12.1903)
- Alexander von Kaulbars Baron, Lieutenant General (01.01.1904 — 22.10.1904)
- Semyon Vasilievich Kakhanov, General of the cavalry (10.1904 - 27.08.1905)
- Alexander von Kaulbars, Baron, General of the Cavalry (27.08.1905 — 23.12.1909)
- Nikolai Zarubaev, General of Infantry (24.12.1909 — 10.06.1912)
- Vladimir Nikolayevich Nikitin, General of artillery (13.06.1912 — 19.07.1914)

=== Commanders, 1939–1991 ===
- Lieutenant General Ivan Boldin (October 1939 — July 1940)
- Lieutenant General Yakov Cherevichenko (July 1940 — June 1941)
- Lieutenant General Nikandr Chibisov (June 1941 — August 1941)
- Major General Ivan Ivanov (August 1941 - September 1941)
- German occupation
- General Colonel Ivan Zakharkin (March 1944 — October 1944)
- Major General Aleksei Pervushin (October 1944)
- General Colonel Vasily Yushkevich (October 1944 - June 1946) (former commander of 31st Army)
- Marshal of the Soviet Union Georgy Zhukov (June 1946 – February 1948)
- General Colonel Nikolay Pukhov (February 1948–1951),
- General Colonel Kuzma Galitsky (1951–1954),
- General Colonel Alexei Radzievsky (1954–1959),
- General Colonel Hamazasp Babadzhanian (P H Babadjanyan) (1959 - March 1967)
- General Colonel Mikhail Lugovtsev (March 1967 – December 1967)
- General Colonel Aleksandr Shyrypov (January 1968 – 1974)
- General Colonel Ivan Voloshin (1974–1982)
- General Colonel Aleksander Yelagin (1982–1986)
- General Colonel Ivan Morozov (1986–1992)

=== Forces in the 1980s ===
Around 1988, the District contained the following forces:

- 14th Guards Army
  - 28th Guards Motor Rifle Division (Chornomorske/Pivdenne?)(became 28th Guards Mechanised Brigade circa 2001)
  - 59th Guards Motor Rifle Division (Tiraspol)
  - 86th Guards Motor Rifle Division (Bălți) Headquarters moved to Florești and became 5381st Equipment Storage Base on 1 December 1989.
  - 180th Motor Rifle Division (Belgorod-Dnestrovsky)
- 32nd Army Corps 'Кенигсберский' (Simferopol)
  - 126th Motor Rifle Division (Simferopol) Formed 17 November 1964. Transferred to the Black Sea Fleet in 1989. Disbanded 1 February 1996.
  - 157th Motor Rifle Division (Feodosiya)(501st Motor Rifle Regiment (Kerch), 84th Motor Rifle Regiment, 91 мсп, ап (Керчь), зрп). In 1990 became the 5378th Base for Storage of Weapons and Equipment. Came under Ukrainian control 1992.
  - 1398th Anti-tank Artillery Regiment (Lugovoe/Луговое)
  - Other corps troops included the - 9th Engineer-Sapper Battalion, 909th Signals Battalion, 287 радиотехнический батальон, 858 ремонтно-восстановительный батальон (Мазанка) - 301st Artillery Brigade (Simferopol)
- District Troops
  - 92nd Guards Training Motor Rifle Division (Nikolaev/Shirokiy Lan) - Reorganised as the 150th District Training Centre, and later after Ukrainian independence, the 92nd District Training Centre.
  - 98th Guards Airborne Division (Bolgrad)
  - 40th independent Landing-Assault Brigade (Nikolayev, Odesa Oblast, from October 1979). Transferred to Soviet Airborne Troops from Odesa MD in June 1990, handed over to Ukrainian control 1992, redesignated later 79th Airmobile Brigade.
  - 10th independent Special Forces Brigade GRU (activated 10.62 in Karagoz, Crimean Oblast). Taken over by Ukraine early 1992 (directive issued 11.10.91).
  - 55th Artillery Division (Zaporozhia/Novaya Alexandrovka) In 1988 consisted of 371st Multiple rocket Launcher Brigade (48 9A52 "Smerch") and two artillery regiments - 701st Howitzer artillery regiment (48 units of D-30) and 751st antitank artillery regiment (84 MT-LBT guided missile system), and 3 shelves and 2 base in Novo-Aleksandrovka
- 5th Air Army

=== Ukraine/Moldova ===
Following the dissolution of the Soviet Union the 14th Guards Army became entangled in the later War of Transnistria. The 98th Guards Airborne Division was split between Russia and Ukraine; the Ukrainian half became the 1st Airmobile Division and the Russian part was withdrawn to Ivanovo in the Moscow Military District and became part of the Russian Airborne Troops.

The 5381st Equipment Storage Base with its headquarters at Florești, the former 86th Guards Motor Rifle Division, was taken over by Moldova.

The 5th Air Army was later redesignated the 5th Aviation Corps of the Ukrainian Air Force in 1994.

Colonel General Volodymyr Shkidchenko commanded the Odessa Military District from December 1993 until it became the Operational Command South in February 1998. Since January 3, 1998 the Odessa Military District was transformed into the Southern Operational Command of the Ukrainian Ground Forces according to the Decree of Ministry of Defense of Ukraine from July 1, 1997. The command encompasses nine oblasts: Odesa, Mykolaiv, Kherson, Dnipropetrovsk, Zaporizhzhia, Donetsk, Luhansk, Kirovohrad, Kharkiv, and the autonomous republic of Crimea.

==== Commanders (Ukraine) ====
- General Lieutenant Vitaliy Radetsky (1992–1993)
- Colonel General Volodymyr Shkidchenko (1993–1998)

== Notes ==
- Feskov, V. I.; Golikov, V. I.; Kalashnikov, K. A.; Slugin, S. A. (2013). Вооруженные силы СССР после Второй Мировой войны: от Красной Армии к Советской [The Armed Forces of the USSR after World War II: From the Red Army to the Soviet: Part 1 Land Forces] (in Russian). Tomsk: Scientific and Technical Literature Publishing. ISBN 9785895035306.
- Tsouras, Peter G. (1994). Changing Orders: The evolution of the World's Armies, 1945 to the Present. Facts On File, Inc. pp. 43-44. ISBN 0-8160-3122-3.
