= The Battle of Stalingrad (film) =

1949 film by Vladimir Petrov

- A poster of the film.
- Directed by: Vladimir Petrov
- Screenplay by: Nikolai Virta
- Based on: Battle of Stalingrad
- Produced by: Nikolai Dostal
- Starring: Aleksei Dikiy
- Narrated by: Yuri Levitan
- Cinematography: Yuri Yekelchik
- Edited by: Klavdiya Moskvina
- Music by: Aram Khachaturian
- Production company: Mosfilm
- Release dates: 9 May 1949 (Film I); 8 November 1949 (Film II)
- Running time: 192 minutes (combined): Film I: 98 minutes; Film II: 94 minutes
- Country: Soviet Union
- Language: Russian

The Battle of Stalingrad (Russian: Сталинградская битва) is a 1949 two-part Soviet war film about the Battle of Stalingrad, directed by Vladimir Petrov. The script was written by Nikolai Virta.

== Plot ==
=== Film I ===
In the Kremlin, Stalin analyzes the Wehrmacht's movements and concludes that the Germans aim to capture Stalingrad. Hitler, who believes the city is the key to final victory, orders his generals take it at all costs.

As the enemy approaches Stalingrad, the Red Army and the local population rally to defend it in bitter house-to-house combat, stalling the German advance. In Moscow, Stalin plans the counter-offensive.

=== Film II ===
The Wehrmacht launches a last, massive assault, intended to overwhelm the defenders of Stalingrad. As the Red Army is pushed back to the Volga, Stalin orders the commencement of Operation Uranus. The German 6th Army is encircled, and efforts to relieve the Stalingrad pocket fail. General Friedrich Paulus, ordered by Hitler to hold to the end, refuses to surrender while his soldiers starve. The Soviets close on the city, battering the German forces as they advance. After Red Army soldiers enter his command post, Paulus orders his remaining troops to surrender. The Soviets hold a victory rally in liberated Stalingrad; in Moscow, Stalin looks at a map, setting his eyes on Berlin.

== Production ==
The film is the last of the 'Artistic Documentaries', a series of propaganda epics that recreated the history of the Second World War with a Stalinist interpretation of the events. Like all of the other films in the genre, The Battle of Stalingrad consists mainly of battle scenes and staff meetings, reconstructing the campaign from the point of view of the soldiers and the generals, in a heroic manner fitting the state's ideology.

== Reception ==
The movie won the Crystal Globe in the 1949 Karlovy Vary Film Festival. Aleksei Dikiy, who portrayed Stalin, received the 1949 Gottwaldov Film Festival's prize, and director Vladimir Petrov won the Czechoslovak Workers' Film Festival Best Director Award. Petrov, cinematographer Yuri Yekelchik and four actors – Aleksei Dikiy, Nikolay Simonov, Yuri Shumsky and Vladimir Gaidarov – were awarded the Stalin Prize at 1950 for their role in the film.

French critic André Bazin wrote that the film portrayed Stalin as a super-human leader, showing him planning the Soviet war effort almost on his own: "Even if we grant Stalin a hyper-Napoleonic military genius... It would be childish to think that events in the Kremlin unfolded as they are seen here." Richard Taylor listed The Battle of Stalingrad as "a personality cult film".

== Cast ==
- Aleksei Dikiy – Joseph Stalin
- Maksim Shtraukh – Vyacheslav Molotov
- Viktor Khokhryakov – Georgy Malenkov
- Mikhail Kvarelashvili – Lavrentiy Beria
- Nikolai Dorokhin – Nikita Khrushchev
- Vladimir Solovyov – Mikhail Kalinin
- Yuri Tolubeyev – Andrei Zhdanov
- Nikolai Ryzhov – Lazar Kaganovich
- Garri Mushegyan – Anastas Mikoyan
- Mikhail Derzhavin – Kliment Voroshilov
- Yuri Shumsky – General Aleksandr Vasilevsky
- Vasili Merkuryev – General Nikolay Voronov
- Boris Livanov – General Konstantin Rokossovsky
- Nikolai Kolesnikov – General Andrey Yeryomenko
- Nikolay Simonov – General Vasily Chuikov
- Vasily Orlov – General Nikolay Krylov
- Sergei Brzhesky – General Aleksandr Rodimtsev
- Nikolai Plotnikov – Commissioner Gurov
- Boris Smirnov – Lieutenant Kaleganov
- Leonid Knyazev – Sergeant Yakov Pavlov
- Vladimir Golovin – General Nikolai Vatutin
- Aleksei Krasnopolsky – General Nikolai Trufanov
- Mikhail Nazvanov – Colonel Ivan Lyudnikov
- Nikolai Kryuchkov – Lieutenant Ivanov
- Aleksandr Antonov – Colonel Popov
- Nikolay Cherkasov – Franklin D. Roosevelt
- Viktor Stanitsyn – Winston Churchill/General Fyodor Tolbukhin
- Konstantin Mikhailov – W. Averell Harriman
- Mikhail Astangov – Adolf Hitler
- Mikhail Garkavi – Hermann Göring
- Nikolai Komissarov – Field Marshal Wilhelm Keitel
- Boris Svoboda – General Alfred Jodl
- Nikolai Rybnikov – Field Marshal Maximilian von Weichs
- Vladimir Vsevolodov – General Arthur Schmidt
- Vladimir Gaidarov – Field Marshal Friedrich Paulus
- Yevgeny Kaluzhsky – General Wilhelm Adam (first film)
- Nikolai Nikolayevsky – General Wilhelm Adam (second film)
- Vladimir Chernyavsky – General Kurt Zeitzler
- Rostislav Plyatt – General Hermann Hoth
- Sergei Blinnikov – Alexander Poskrebyshev (uncredited)
- Yuri Levitan – Narrator
