= Arthur Schmidt (general) =

German army officer (1895–1987)

- Born: 25 October 1895; Hamburg
- Died: 5 November 1987 (aged 92); Karlsruhe
- Military career
- Allegiance: German Empire; Weimar Republic; Nazi Germany
- Service years: 1914–1943
- Rank: Generalleutnant
- Conflicts: World War I; World War II; Invasion of Poland; Battle of the Netherlands; Battle of Belgium; Battle of Stalingrad
- Awards: Knight's Cross of the Iron Cross

Arthur Schmidt (25 October 1895 – 5 November 1987) was an officer in the German military from 1914 to 1943. He attained the rank of Generalleutnant during World War II, and is best known for his role as the Sixth Army's chief of staff in the Battle of Stalingrad in 1942–43, during the final stages of which he became its de facto commander, playing a large role in executing Hitler's order that it stand firm despite being encircled by the Red Army. He was a prisoner of war in the Soviet Union for twelve years, and was released following West German chancellor Konrad Adenauer's visit to Moscow in 1955.

== World War I ==
Schmidt joined the army as a one-year volunteer on 10 August 1914, attaining the rank of Leutnant on 8 May 1915.

== World War II ==
Schmidt held various positions in the Heer, including chief of operations in Fifth Army (25 August 1939 – 12 October 1939) and Eighteenth Army (5 November 1939 – 1 October 1940). On 25 October 1940 he served as chief of staff in 5th Army Corps, a position he held until 25 March 1942, when he moved to the Führerreserve at Oberkommando des Heeres (OKH). On 26 January 1942 he was awarded the German Cross in Gold.

Schmidt was appointed chief of staff to General Friedrich Paulus in Sixth Army on 15 May 1942, replacing Colonel Ferdinand Heim after the counter-attack against Marshal Semyon Timoshenko at the Second Battle of Kharkov. The British historian and author Antony Beevor offers the following description of Schmidt:

[He was] a slim, sharp-featured and sharp-tongued staff officer from a Hamburg mercantile family. Schmidt, confident of his own abilities, put many backs up within Sixth Army headquarters, although he also had his supporters. Paulus relied greatly on his judgement, and as a result he played a large, some say an excessive, role in determining the course of events later that year.

=== Encirclement of Sixth Army at Stalingrad ===
Despite Lieutenant-Colonel Niemeyer's frank and pessimistic area briefings, Schmidt severely underestimated the build-up and capabilities of Soviet forces at Stalingrad following the initial Axis successes, a failing that he – unlike Paulus – subsequently did not attempt to excuse. Ignoring Hitler's 'Führer instruction' of 30 June 1942 that Axis formations should not liaise with their neighbours, Schmidt authorised an officer from Sixth Army, Lieutenant Gerhard Stöck, to be issued with a radio and join up with Romanian forces to the north-west of Stalingrad to help with intelligence gathering. Many false reports of the massing of Soviet forces were received from the Romanian sector, so when Stöck radioed at 5 a.m. on 19 November that an offensive (marking the start of Operation Uranus, the Soviet encirclement of Axis forces) was about to begin, Schmidt, who was furious when disturbed by false alarms, was not informed, although he was awoken twenty minutes later when it became clear that this was no false alarm.

Paulus and Schmidt realised that Sixth Army was encircled on 21 November. Evacuating their HQ at Golubinsky amid a bonfire of burning files and stores, they flew to Nizhne-Chirskaya that same day, just missing Hitler's order that "Sixth Army stand firm in spite of danger of temporary encirclement." At Nizhne-Chirskaya on 22 November, Schmidt told 8th Air Corps's commander, General Martin Fiebig, that Sixth Army needed to be resupplied by air. He was told that "The Luftwaffe doesn't have enough aircraft." Later that day, Schmidt and Paulus held a conference attended by General Hermann Hoth and Major-General Pickert, during which Schmidt "did much of the talking". He re-emphasised that before Sixth Army could break out to the south: "We must have fuel and ammunition delivered by the Luftwaffe." When told that this was impossible, he replied that "more than 10,000 wounded and the bulk of the heavy weapons and vehicles would have to be left behind. That would be a Napoleonic ending." Schmidt maintained that the army, which would adopt a "hedgehog" defence, must be resupplied, but that the situation was not yet so desperate as there were plenty of horses left that could serve as food. All the while, Paulus remained silent; the only time he spoke during the conference "was to agree with his chief of staff".

On the afternoon of 22 November, Schmidt flew with Paulus to the new Sixth Army HQ at Gumrak. That evening the Soviet encirclement of Axis forces was confirmed in a signal Paulus sent to Hitler. Schmidt contacted his corps commanders and, in defiance of Hitler's order to stand firm, they agreed with Schmidt that a breakout to the south was desirable. Paulus and Schmidt started planning for the breakout that evening, despite receiving another message from Hitler that they must stand firm and await relief. However, on 24 November Sixth Army received a further Führer order relayed from Army Group B, ordering them to stand firm. Schmidt commented:

Early on the 24th November, while Paulus and I were preparing the necessary measures for a breakout to the south, we received a 'Führer decision' from Army Group [...] It said that the Sixth Army was to stay in Stalingrad and wait to be relieved. We reacted to this order with astonishment, since we had expected some sort of discussion with the Army Group, and were fairly certain of the breakout. Paulus and I came separately to the same conclusion. It now seemed more impossible than ever to act against an order of the High Command or Army Group.

This decision to stand firm in a "hedgehog" defence sealed Sixth Army's fate. When presented with the commander of 51st Corps General Walther von Seydlitz-Kurzbach's 25 November memorandum to Paulus, detailing plans for a breakout, Schmidt said:

"We don't have to break the head of the Führer for him, and neither does General von Seydlitz have to break the head of [General Paulus]."

On 18 or 19 December, Major Eismann was sent by Field Marshal Erich von Manstein to brief Paulus and Schmidt on Operation Donnerschlag, Army Group Don's plan, not sanctioned by Hitler, for the Sixth Army to break out and incorporate itself in Manstein's Army Group. Beevor states that it is unclear what happened at the meeting, except that Paulus, who still believed in the chain of command, refused to break out without a clear order to do so from a superior, something that the politically deft Manstein refused to give.

=== Schmidt as commander in the Kessel ===
Interrogation of captured German officers led Soviet commanders to realise that, because of the toll of events on Paulus's nerves, Schmidt was the real commander of the defending forces. According to Beevor:

[Soviet commanders] were increasingly convinced that Paulus was virtually a prisoner in his own headquarters, guarded by his chief of staff [Schmidt]. Dyatlenko had no doubt that Schmidt was "the eyes and hand of the Nazi Party" in the Sixth Army, because captured officers reported that "Schmidt was commanding the Army and even Paulus himself."

Other historians, such as Samuel Mitcham, agree:

As the situation in Stalingrad deteriorated, Paulus's self-confidence declined, and he allowed himself (and 6th Army) to be more and more guided by his chief of staff, until Arthur Schmidt was virtually conducting the battle for the German side. Schmidt was not a man of great tactical skill, daring or initiative; rather he was characterised by a stubborn optimism, tenacity and a willingness to obey the orders of his superiors without question. These characteristics of Paulus and Schmidt would prove fatal to the trapped garrison of Stalingrad.

The decision not to negotiate with the Soviet envoys who bore an ultimatum to Paulus on 8 and 9 January 1943, was, for example, made by Schmidt, not Paulus, as Colonel Wilhelm Adam told one of the envoys, Captain Nikolay Dyatlenko, during his post-battle interrogation. The envoys were even fired on; Paulus denied that he had ordered this, so it is possible that Schmidt might have issued the order. When General Hans-Valentin Hube flew into the Kessel [the encircled pocket of Axis forces in Stalingrad] on the morning of 9 January with Hitler's message to stand firm, "this strengthened General Schmidt's intransigent position at Sixth Army's headquarters."

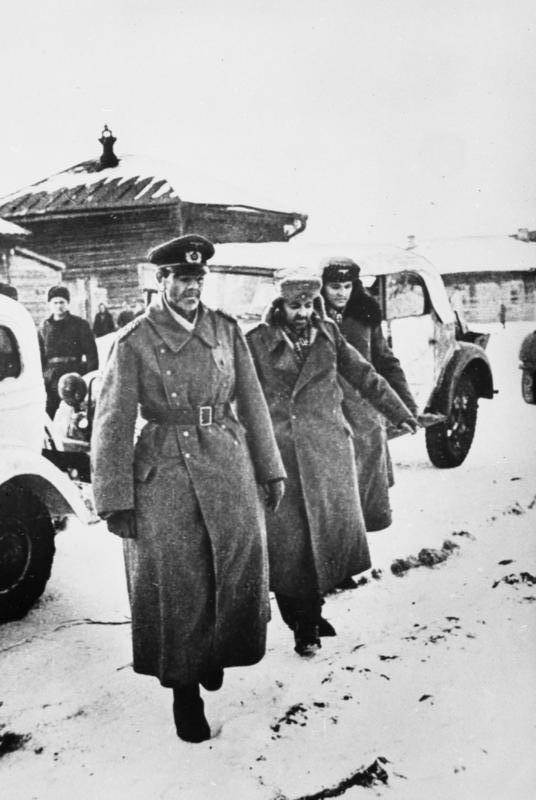
Schmidt (centre), with Field Marshal Paulus (left) and Colonel Adam (right), after the German surrender at Stalingrad on 31 January 1943

It has been suggested that much of the reason for Schmidt's ascendancy over Paulus lay in the fact that, unlike Paulus, Schmidt was a committed Nazi, and Paulus, afraid of Hitler and conscious of his responsibility for Sixth Army's catastrophic position, saw Schmidt as a cipher for the Führer whom he could placate. According to Pois and Langer:

[Paulus's] chief of staff, Arthur Schmidt, a committed National Socialist to the end, seemed to represent Hitler for Paulus, indeed, probably was Hitler at Stalingrad. Aggressively ideological, his aggression would translate into a passive kind as he functioned as his chief's alter ego [...] As late as mid-December, Paulus, even as illusions had all but vanished, would still not contradict Schmidt when he presented his tragically absurd hypotheses to visitors to the besieged and starving Sixth Army.

Hitler awarded the Knight's Cross to Schmidt on 6 January 1943 – on the same day that Paulus signalled to General Kurt Zeitzler: "Army starving and frozen, have no ammunition and cannot move tanks any more" – and made him Generalleutnant on 17 January. On 19 January, Major Thiel was sent by VIII Air Corps to assess the runway at Gumrak and see whether further landings by Luftwaffe supply aircraft would be possible. After he concluded that they would not, telling both Schmidt and Paulus so, Paulus reprimanded him for the original promise that air supply to Sixth Army would be possible, asking him: "Can you imagine that the soldiers fall upon a horse cadaver, split open its head, and devour the brain raw?" Schmidt addressed Thiel in the same vein:

"[...] here you come trying to justify the Luftwaffe, that has committed the worst treason, that has ever occurred in German history [...] An entire army, this wonderful 6th Army, must go to the dogs like this."

Thyssen comments that both Paulus and Schmidt seemed to have forgotten Fiebig's statements on 21 and 22 November that the Luftwaffe would not be able to supply Sixth Army in the Kessel.

Schmidt and Paulus set up their HQ in the Kessel underneath the Univermag department store on the city's Red Square. The signal sent from Sixth Army HQ on the evening of 30 January, that stated that soldiers were "listening to the national anthem for the last time with arms raised in the German salute", was, according to Beevor, much more likely to have been written by Schmidt than by Paulus. When the forces defending Sixth Army HQ surrendered on the morning of 31 January, Schmidt discussed surrender terms with officers from General Shumilov's HQ, while Paulus waited unaware in a room next door. Beevor comments, "Whether this was a ploy to allow Paulus to distance himself from the surrender, or a further example of Schmidt handling events because Paulus was in state of nervous collapse, is not clear." Schmidt, together with Paulus and Colonel Adam, were taken to Don Front HQ at Zavarykino, where they were interrogated. When their baggage was searched for sharp metal objects, Schmidt, referring to Paulus, snapped at the Soviet officers:

"A German Field Marshal does not commit suicide with a pair of scissors."

Prior to Paulus's interrogation, Paulus asked Schmidt how he should respond, to which Schmidt replied, "Remember you are a Field Marshal of the German Army," apparently (according to the Soviet interrogator) using the intimate "du" form of address, although Captain Winrich Behr, who was familiar with the relations between the two men, considered this unlikely.

== Prisoner of war ==
Of all the senior German officers held at Zavarykino, Schmidt was the most disliked by the Soviets; on one occasion he apparently reduced a mess waitress to tears during lunch, for which a Soviet officer, Lieutenant Bogomolov, made him apologise. Unlike many German prisoners of war, such as Paulus himself and von Seydlitz-Kurzbach, Schmidt refused to co-operate with the Soviets, despite the NKVD's attempt to ingratiate themselves by serving him caviar and champagne in a luxury railway coach. Together with most German officers, Schmidt was moved to NKVD special camp No. 48, although he was kept away from Paulus by the NKVD, apparently because he was considered to be a bad influence on him.

After Voikovo, Schmidt was held in the Lubyanka prison. He remained there until 1955, when a visit to Moscow by West German Chancellor Konrad Adenauer led to his release, together with the remaining high-ranking German prisoners.

== Later life ==
Following his release, Schmidt remained bitterly hostile to those German officers who had co-operated with the Soviets in the National Committee for a Free Germany. He died in Karlsruhe, West Germany on 5 November 1987.

== Sources ==
- Bastable, Jonathan (2007). Voices from Stalingrad: Unique First-Hand Accounts from World War II's Cruellest Battle. London: David and Charles. ISBN 978-0-7153-2725-8.
- Beevor, Antony (1999). Stalingrad. London: Penguin. ISBN 0-14-024985-0.
- Erickson, John (1983). The Road to Berlin. London: Weidenfeld and Nicolson. ISBN 0-297-77238-4.
- Fellgiebel, W. P. (2003). Elite of the Third Reich, The Recipients of the Knight's Cross of the Iron Cross 1939-1945: A Reference. Solihull: Helion & Company Limited. ISBN 1-874622-46-9.
- Manstein, Erich von; Powell, Anthony G. (2004). Lost Victories. Zenith Imprint. ISBN 978-0-7603-2054-9.
- Mitcham, Samuel W. (2008). The Rise of the Wehrmacht: The German Armed Forces and World War II (vol. 1). ABC-CLIO. ISBN 9780275996413.
- Patzwall, K.; Scherzer, V. (2001). Das Deutsche Kreuz 1941-1945, Geschichte und Inhaber. Norderstedt: Verlag Klaus D. Patzwall. ISBN 3-931533-45-X.
- Pois, Robert A.; Langer, Philip (2004). Command Failure in War: psychology and leadership. Bloomingdale: Indiana University Press. ISBN 978-0-253-34378-9.
- Roberts, Geoffrey (2002). Victory at Stalingrad: the battle that changed history. London: Longman. ISBN 978-0-582-77185-7.
- Stein, Marcel (2006). Field Marshal von Manstein, a Portrait: the Janus Head. Solihull: Helion & Company. ISBN 978-1-906033-02-6.
- Thyssen, Mike (1997), A Desperate Struggle to Save a Condemned Army: a critical review of the Stalingrad airlift, Research Department, Air Command and Staff College, pp. 1–55, archived from the original on 28 February 2012
- Verlag Media Data (2002). Die Ordensträger der Deutschen Wehrmacht. Osnabrück: VMD-Verlag GmbH. ISBN 0-297-77238-4.
