= Nikolay Dyatlenko =

Ukrainian Soviet translator (1914–1996)

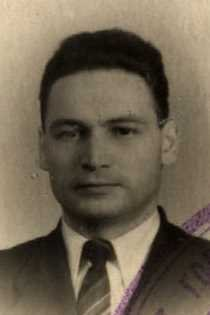
- Born: 26 November [O.S. 15] 1914; Lebedin, Kharkov Governorate, Russian Empire
- Died: 11 October 1996 (aged 81); Kyiv, Ukraine
- Education: Kiev State University
- Military career
- Allegiance: Soviet Union
- Branch: Red Army
- Service years: 1941–1945
- Rank: Major
- Known for: Interpreter for German prisoners of war in the aftermath of the Battle of Stalingrad
- Conflicts: World War II; Eastern Front; Battle of Stalingrad
- Awards: Order of the Red Banner (2x); Order of the Patriotic War; Order of the Red Star
- Other work: Senior researcher, historian

Nikolay Dmitriyevich Dyatlenko (Ukrainian: Микола Дмитрович Дятленко; Russian: Николай Дмитриевич Дятленко; 26 November 1914 – 11 October 1996) was a Ukrainian Soviet officer, interrogator and translator who was part of a team that attempted to deliver a message of truce (sometimes referred to as an "ultimatum") to the German Sixth Army at the Battle of Stalingrad in January 1943. He also acted as the translator at the interrogation of Field Marshal Friedrich Paulus a few weeks later.

== Early life and military service ==
Dyatlenko was born in 1914 to a peasant family in the village of Kulichka in present-day Sumy Raion, Sumy Oblast, Ukraine. He graduated from the Dnipropetrovsk Railway Transport Tekhnikum in 1935, then studied philology at the University of Kyiv. After Germany invaded the Soviet Union, Dyatlenko joined the Red Army as an ordinary soldier in June 1941. On account of his knowledge of German, Dyatlenko was assigned to the 7th Department of the Political Directorate of the Southwestern Front, engaged in agitation attempting to persuade German soldiers to surrender and cooperate with Soviet forces. He served as a writer and translator for a newspaper produced by the front political directorate targeting German soldiers. In August he became a senior instructor of the 7th Department for work among enemy troops and population with the rank of captain. Dyatlenko held this position for the rest of the war, and continued serving with the department when the Southwestern Front was renamed the Stalingrad Front in mid-1942.

== Stalingrad truce ==
=== First attempt ===
A fluent German speaker, Captain Dyatlenko was transferred to the 7th Department of the Stalingrad Front in the autumn of 1942 to help with the interrogations of German prisoners of war. Antony Beevor claims that he was a member of the NKVD, but this is not supported by his military records. There is no mention of this in Dyatlenko's account of the ultimatum delivery, and the index in John Erickson's Road to Berlin lists him as a Red Army officer.

Together with Major Aleksandr Mikhailovich Smyslov from Red Army Intelligence, Dyatlenko was chosen by NKVD and Red Army officers to deliver notice of truce to the beleaguered German forces in the Kessel at the Battle of Stalingrad. Smyslov was to be the truce envoy and carried the truce papers in an oilskin packet, whilst Dyatlenko was his interpreter.

Dyatlenko had no idea of the sort of behaviour that was expected of a truce envoy, later admitting that all he knew of the necessary protocols came from Solovyov's play Field Marshal Kutuzov, about the French invasion of Russia in 1812. On 7 January 1943 the two envoys were dressed in the finest uniforms available (the Russian quartermaster assured them that they would be "dressed like bridegrooms") and were driven with Colonel Vinogradov in a Willys jeep to the edge of 24th Army's sector at Kotluban. All shooting ceased during the night and on 8 January 1943, Dyatlenko and Smyslov, accompanied by a Red Army trumpeter armed with a three-note trumpet and a white flag, approached the German lines. On their first approach they were driven back by German fire. On a second approach they had no better luck; the fire was not aimed directly at them, but, as on the previous day, was meant to drive them back.

=== Second attempt ===
According to one account, the Stavka was keen to call off any further attempts to initiate a truce but on the evening of 8–9 January Soviet planes overflew the Kessel, dropping leaflets signed by Voronov and Rokossovsky addressed to "Deutsche Offiziere, Unteroffiziere und Mannschaften" and printed with an ultimatum to Paulus; they also dropped bombs. German soldiers later admitted that they had picked up these leaflets and read them, so the ultimatum was known about in the defending German army. Dyatlenko and Smyslov were driven to the HQ of the 96th Rifle Division near Marinovka, then a staff car drove them to the front line, from where they proceeded on foot.

On their second attempt, the envoys forgot their white flag, so a new one had to be made from a sheet belonging to the divisional commander; this was nailed to a branch from an acacia. They were again accompanied by a trumpeter, this time a warrant officer named Siderov, whose call "Attention! Attention", although sounding to Dyatlenko more like 'The Last Post'", had the effect of attracting the attention of a German warrant officer. He asked their business.

"We are truce envoys from the commander of the Red Army," Dyatlenko shouted back in German. "We are on our way to your commander-in-chief with a message. We ask you to receive us according to international law."

—

Blindfolded with the shirt from Siderov's snowsuit (as well as forgetting their white flag, the envoys had forgotten to bring the blindfolds they had carried on their attempt the day before) the three Soviets were led behind German lines, at one point slipping on the ice and creating "an unplanned diversion". The German soldiers who came to their aid themselves slipped and fell over, reminding Dyatlenko of the Ukrainian children's game "A little heap is too little: someone is needed on top". Once they had reached the German trenches and had their blindfolds removed, Dyatlenklo realised to his embarrassment that he was carrying his pistol, against international convention. A senior German officer came in, then left to confer with his superiors; he soon returned and told the Soviet envoys to return, without their oilskin packet having had even a cursory inspection.

"I am ordered," the colonel announced to the Russians, "not to take you anywhere, not to accompany you, nor to receive anything from you, only to cover your eyes again, to lead you back, to return your pistols and to guarantee your safety."

—

Erickson wrote of the incident: "Paulus refused to meet the emissaries, who were informed that the Sixth Army's commander already knew the contents of the message from Soviet radio transmission."

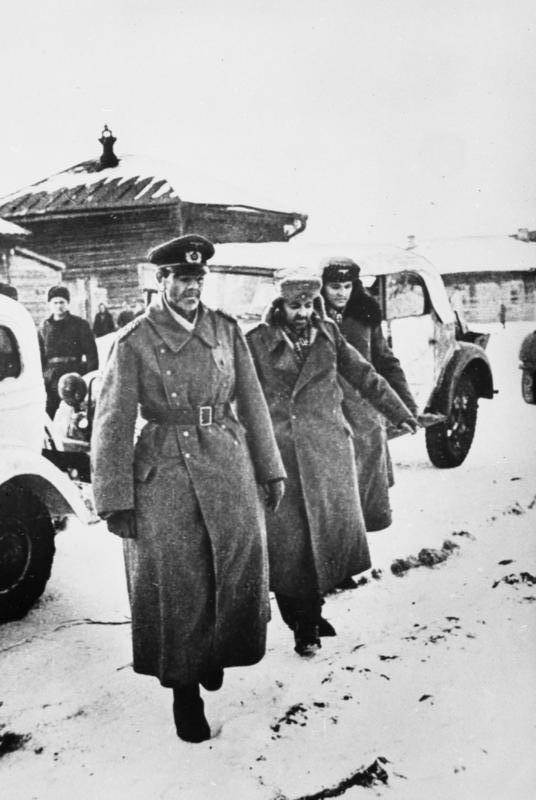
Paulus (left), and his aides Col. Wilhelm Adam (middle) and Lt-Gen. Arthur Schmidt (right), after their surrender in Stalingrad

== Interrogations of captured German officers ==
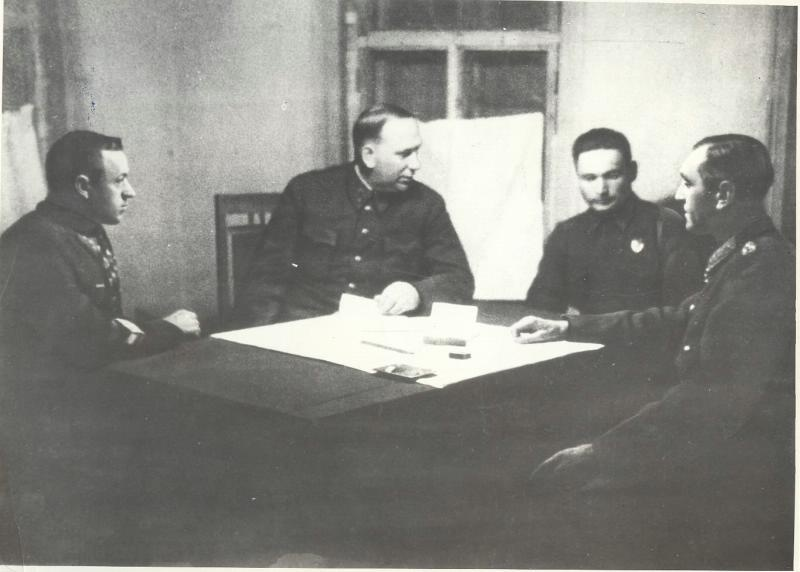
Dyatlenko (centre right, wearing the Order of the Red Banner) during the interrogation of Paulus, 31 January 1943

After the capitulation of Axis forces at Stalingrad in January–February 1943, Dyatlenko interrogated many senior captured German military officers, including a battalion commander of the German 295th Infantry Division, General Edler von Daniels and Colonel Wilhelm Adam. Adam told him that it was in fact General Schmidt, rather than Paulus, who had ordered the truce envoys away without reading their message (Dyatlenko did not reveal to Adam that he himself had been one of the envoys).

He acted as translator at the interview by General Rokossovsky and Marshal Voronov of Field Marshal Paulus, the commander of the encircled Sixth Army, at Don Front HQ in Zavarykin. As Voronov said to Dyatlenko just before the interrogation, referring to the failed envoy mission:

So, Captain [...] You no doubt remember the time the old man didn't want to receive you. Well, now he's visiting us himself. And you're going to receive him.

—

Following the Paulus interrogation, Dyatlenko was assigned to interrogate a number of other captured German generals, such as the commander of XIV Panzerkorps, General Helmuth Schlömer, and General Walther von Seydlitz-Kurzbach. He was awarded the Order of the Red Banner for showing bravery under German fire during the two truce attempts, and received a promotion to the rank of major. After Stalingrad, Dyatlenko continued his service in the 7th Department of the Political Directorates of the Central and 1st Belorussian Fronts.

During the Battle of Kursk, Dyatlenko organized the loudspeaker broadcasting of propaganda to German troops, and on 25 July was recommended for the Order of the Red Star, which was awarded on 6 August. The citation read:

Major Nikolay Dmitriyevich Dyatlenko, during the preparation and conduct of the battles on the Oryol–Kursk axis conducted significant work for the strengthening of the work of the 7th Department of the Army Political Department. He organized the work of a powerful loudspeaker, ensuing the nonstop broadcast of the crew under enemy artillery and mortar fire. In the sector of loudspeaker broadcasts, several German soldiers went over to our side, giving valuable information to the command about the forthcoming offensive of German troops on the Oryol–Kursk and Balgorod axes.

In March 1944, leading a group of German antifascists, he parachuted into the German rear to join the Logoysk "Bolshevik" Partisan Brigade, tasked with conducting agitation, on a special mission directed by the Central Committee of the Communist Party of Byelorussia. The group was assessed by his superiors as having conducted significant work to demoralize German garrisons in the rear. In battle with German troops, attempting to encircle the partisans, Dyatlenko was seriously wounded, returning to Soviet lines in July. He was awarded a second Order of the Red Banner on 4 August in recognition of his performance in the operation. Dyatlenko spent the remainder of the war in the political department of the Karelian Front's 32nd Army and in the Political Directorate of that front. For his war service, Dyatlenko received two Orders of the Red Banner, the Order of the Red Star, and seven medals.

== Later life ==
After the end of the war, Dyatlenko returned to Kiev University to finish his education, graduating from its philology department in 1946. He worked at the Foreign Ministry of the Ukrainian SSR for the next four years before switching to journalism, and becoming head of a department of the Ukraina magazine in 1950 and editor of Bolshevik Ukrainy, the official magazine of the Central Committee of the Communist Party of Ukraine, in 1951. Dyatlenko went to Moscow in 1952 to continue his education at the Academy of Social Sciences of the Central Committee of the Communist Party of the Soviet Union, where he specialized in international relations and the world labor and national liberation movements. He successfully defended his dissertation, titled "The Struggle of the Soviet Union against the use of the UN by the United States as a means of aggression against China and Korea (1950–1953)", in 1955, and received the title Candidate of Historical Sciences.

Dyatlenko returned to journalism in 1955 as editor of the Komunist Ukrainy magazine (the renamed Bolshevik Ukrainy) and was a head editor of the Ukrainian Soviet Encyclopedia. Between 1959 and 1964 he worked as a writer and literary translator, then in 1964 became a senior researcher of the departments of Oriental History, Contemporary History, and the History of the Great Patriotic War at the Institute of History of the Academy of Sciences of the Ukrainian SSR. He researched international solidarity in the struggle against Fascism and antifascist resistance in Germany, Austria and other European countries. Dyatlenko published more than 50 works and was a coauthor of the works "Ukraine and the Near and Far East" (Kiev, 1968) and "International Solidarity in the Struggle against Fascism, 1933–1945" (Kiev, 1970). In 1974 he embarked on a career as a writer. Among Dyatlenko's translations from German were The Visions of Simone Machard and Three Comrades. Dyatlenko died in Kyiv on 11 October 1996.

== Bibliography ==
- Zhilin, V. А. (2002). Сталинградская битва: хроника, факты, люди, Book 2. (contains Dyatlenko's account of the delivery of the ultimatum). Olma Media Group. ISBN 5-224-03184-2.

== Sources ==
- Beevor, Antony (1999). Stalingrad. London: Penguin. ISBN 0-14-024985-0.
- Erickson, John (1983). The Road to Berlin. London: Weidenfeld and Nicolson. ISBN 0-297-77238-4.
- Ovcharenko, P. (1998). "Дятленко Микола Дмитрович". Вчені Інституту історії України. Біобібліографічний довідник. Випуск 1 [Researchers of the Institute of History of Ukraine: Bibliographical guide. Issue 1] (in Ukrainian). Institute of History of Ukraine. ISBN 966-02-0022-6.
- Voron'ko, Platon (1985). 22 июня--9 мая. Радянський письменник.
