= Willy Riedel =

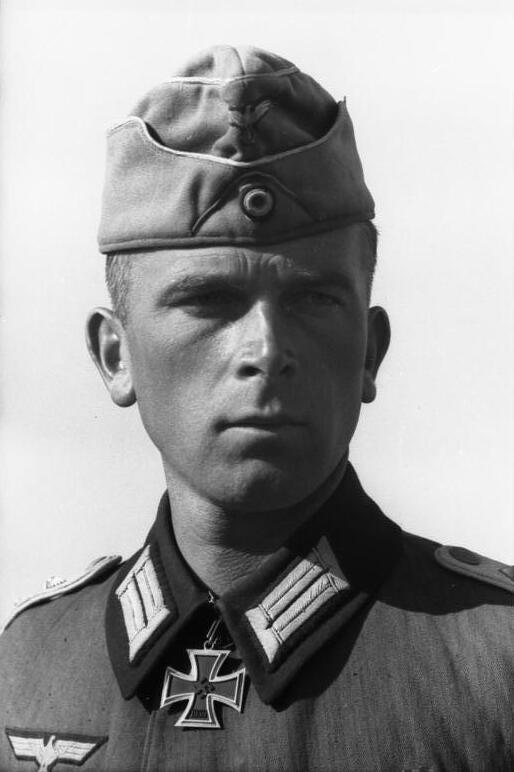
- Born: 10 November 1909; Liegnitz, Silesia, German Empire
- Died: 10 February 1982 (aged 72); Potsdam, East Germany
- Burial place: Neuer Friedhof, Potsdam
- Military career
- Allegiance: Nazi Germany (to 1944) (German Empire) NKFD (to 1945); East Germany
- Branch: Army (Nazi Germany); Kasernierte Volkspolizei (East Germany)
- Service years: 1937–45
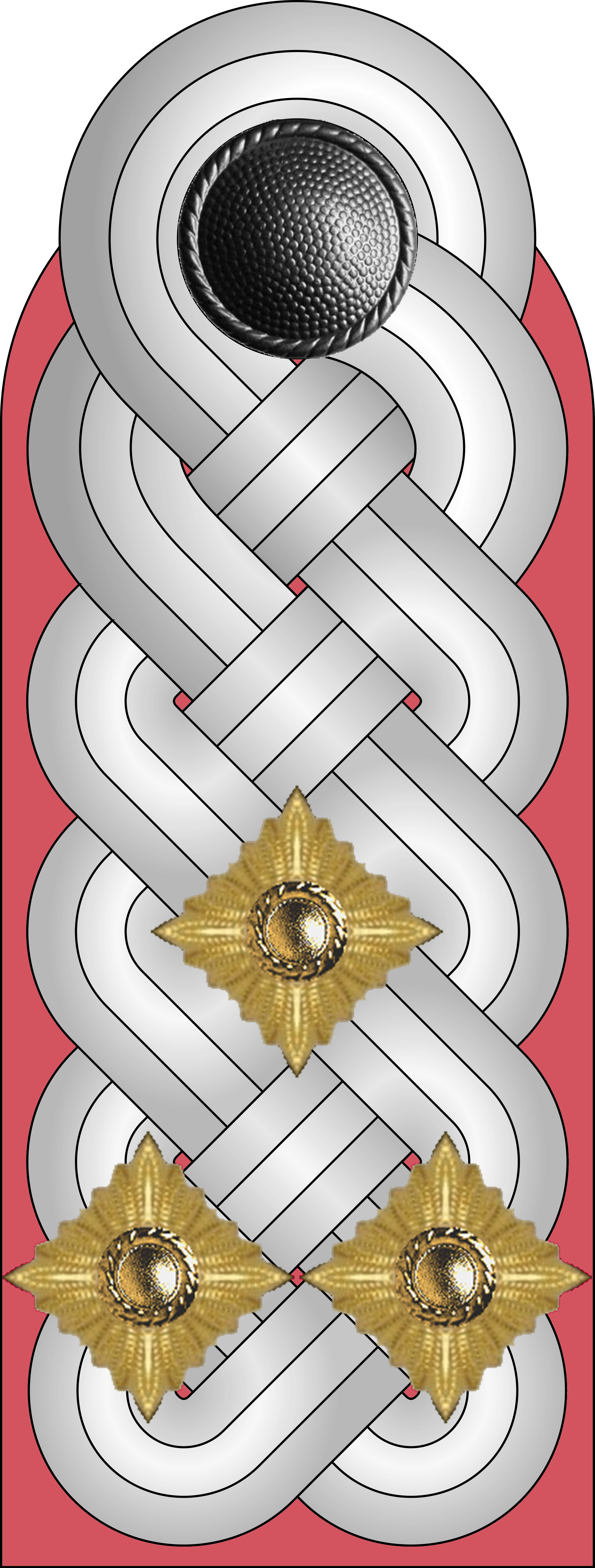
- Rank: Major (Wehrmacht) Oberst (Kasernierte Volkspolizei)
- Commands: III./Infanterie-Regiment 524; 6. motorisierte Schützendivision
- Conflicts: World War II
- Awards: Knight's Cross of the Iron Cross with Oak Leaves

Willy Riedel (Note: Sometimes spelled Willi Riedel.) (10 November 1909 – 10 February 1982) was a highly decorated Major in the Wehrmacht during World War II. He was also a recipient of the Knight's Cross of the Iron Cross with Oak Leaves. The Knight's Cross (German: Ritterkreuz), and its variants were the highest awards in the military and paramilitary forces of Nazi Germany during World War II. He was severely wounded in early 1943 by a grenade splinter and taken prisoner of war by the Soviet Army. Following World War II, he served in the National People's Army of East Germany.

== Early life ==
Riedel, the son of an electrician, was born on 16 November 1909 in Liegnitz, at the time in the Province of Lower Silesia, present-day Legnica in southwestern Poland. Following his apprenticeship as a joiner, he joined the police school in Frankenstein in Schlesien, present-day Ząbkowice Śląskie, as a police candidate on 4 April 1929.

After the Landespolizei (state police) was transferred into the Wehrmacht, Riedel, holding the rank of Polizei-Oberwachtmeister, joined the Army and was posted to the 1st company of Infantry-Regiment 84 of the 8th Infantry Division. On 26 August 1939, Riedel was transferred to the 12 company of Infantry-Regiment 372 (12./Inf.Rgt. 372) of the 239th Infantry Division. The division had been raised from troops of the Landwehr (national militia) in Oppeln, present-day Opole in Poland, and was under the command of Generalmajor (Major General) Ferdinand Neuling.

== World War II ==
World War II in Europe began on Friday, 1 September 1939, when German forces invaded Poland. Riedel participated in the invasion as a Zugführer (platoon leader) in 12./Inf.Rgt. 372.

On 1 January 1943, Riedel was promoted to Major (major). One month later, on 28 January, Riedel, who had been injured by artillery shell splinter on his left side, was taken prisoner of war by Soviet forces at the field hospital of the 71st Infantry Division during the Battle of Stalingrad. In 1944, he joined the National Committee for a Free Germany (Nationalkomitee Freies Deutschland).

== Later life ==
After World War II, in 1947, Riedel joined the Volkspolizei (People's Police) of German Democratic Republic (East Germany), initially serving as head of the division of the police in Saxony-Anhalt (Referatsleiter in der Abteilung Schutzpolizei der Landespolizeibehörde Sachsen-Anhalt). In 1949, he became head of the Volkspolizei-Bereitschaft (Police Company). He then served in the Kasernierte Volkspolizei (KVP—Barracked People's Police), the military units of the Volkspolizei (police). On 1 June 1952, he commanded the KVP-Bereitschaft in Prenzlau. Riedel then commanded the 6. motorisierte Schützendivision (6th Motorized Rifle Division) of the Nationale Volksarmee (NVA—National People's Army) from 30 October 1956 to 31 December 1957. (Note: According to the Deutsche Digitale Bibliothek from 31 October 1956 to 31 December 1957.)

End-December 1954, Riedel was recruited by Oberstleutnant (Lieutenant Colonel) Rudolf Israel, a representative of the Ministerium für Staatssicherheit (MfS—Stasi), with the intention to have a secret informant among the divisional commanders of the NVA. Subsequently, Riedel's cover name in the MfS was "Siegfried". However, Riedel showed little interest in this type work and undermined communication. In July 1957, Riedel's work for the MfS ended for the first time and Riedel was relieved of his command. Riedel was then transferred to the Institut für Deutsche Militärgeschichte (IDMG—Institute for German Military History) based in Potsdam, taking the position of deputy leader. However, the MfS interest in Riedel did not end while Riedel was working for the IDMG. In October 1961, the MfS finally dropped Riedel as his MfS officer criticized Riedel for his unwillingness to report on other people or to engage in conspiracy. Riedel's approved promotion to Generalmajor (major general) was subsequently revoked.

Riedel died on 10 February 1982 in Potsdam. He was buried at the Neuer Friedhof, the new cemetery in Potsdam.

== Awards and decorations ==
- Iron Cross (1939)
  - 2nd Class (13 November 1939)
  - 1st Class (3 July 1940)
- German Cross in Gold on 30 May 1942 as Hauptmann in the III./Infanterie-Regiment 524
- Knight's Cross of the Iron Cross with Oak Leaves
  - Knight's Cross on 8 October 1942 as Hauptmann and commander of the III./Infanterie-Regiment 524 (Note: According to Scherzer on 8 December 1942.)
  - 186th Oak Leaves on 25 January 1943 as Hauptmann and commander of the III./Grenadier-Regiment 524
