= Nikolai Virta =

Soviet writer, playwright and screenwriter

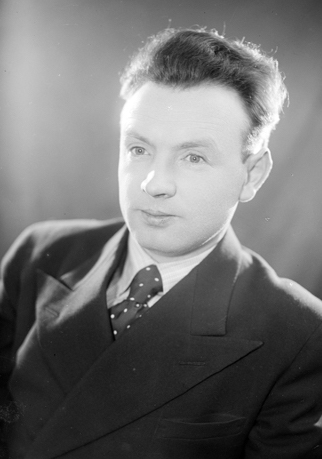
- Born: December 19, 1906; Bolshaya Lazovka, Tambov Governorate, Russian Empire
- Died: January 3, 1976 (aged 69); Moscow, Soviet Union
- Writing career
- Notable awards: Stalin Prize first degree (1949, 1950), Stalin Prize first degree (1941, 1948).

Nikolai Yevgenyevich Virta (Russian: Никола́й Евге́ньевич Вирта́) (real name Karelsky) (19 December [O.S. 6 December] 1906 – January 3, 1976) was a Soviet writer who developed the theory of "conflictless" drama.

== Biography ==
Nikolai Virta was born in the village of Bolshaya Lazovka in Tambov Governorate, into the family of a village priest who was shot in 1921 as a supporter of Aleksandr Antonov. From 1923 he worked as a reporter for newspapers and radio, and after 1930, he lived in Moscow. He took his writer name Virta (Finnish for "stream") as a reference to his Karelian forefathers. He won fame with his 1935 novel Odinochestvo (Alone), which he used as the basis for his play Zemlya (Earth, 1937). He was awarded the Stalin Prize for the novel in 1941, as well as for his plays Khleb nash nashushchny (Our Daily Bread) in 1948 and Zagovor obrechennykh (Conspiracy of the Condemned, a "virulently anti-American drama") in 1949, and for his script for the film Stalingradskaya bitva (The battle of Stalingrad) in 1950. He later turned his 1956 novel Krutye gory (Steep Hills) into the play Dali dal'nye, ne oglyadnye (1957).

In 1943, Joseph Stalin decided to allow publication of the Bible in Russia, and Virta was chosen as the censor for the project; he decided there were no deviations from Communist ideology and passed it without alteration. In 1954, as the result of a scandal, he was excluded from the Writers' Union, but he was reinstated in 1956.

In describing the "nadir of the Soviet theatre" between World War II and the death of Stalin, Michael Glenny writes:

Matters reached the depth of absurdity when one of the most compliant Stalinist playwrights, Nikolay Virta, propounded the theory of 'lack of conflict'. According to this, the only possible basis of drama for a Soviet play was the struggle between the 'good' and the 'better'. The resulting plays were so abysmal that even the party was forced to disown them.

Kornei Chukovsky described Virta as follows in his diary entry for October 19, 1941:

But morally suspect as he is, there is something endearing about him: he hasn't read a thing and doesn't care for poetry, music, or nature, yet he is hardworking, tireless in his machinations (and not only when they're for his own good), not without literary ability (some of his newspaper reports are very well written). It's just that he's a predatory type by nature. He adores things—fancy clothes, fine furniture, rich food—and power.

== English translations ==
- Alone, Foreign Languages Publishing House, 1950.

== Sources ==
- Вирта Николай Евгеньевич (in Russian)
