= Gerhard Bechly =

- Born: 1 July 1898; Berlin, German Empire
- Died: 4 June 1968 (aged 69); East Germany
- Military career
- Allegiance: Nazi Germany; NKFD; East Germany
- Branch: Wehrmacht
- Service years: 1930s-1945 1952-1960s
- Rank: Oberstleutnant; Oberst
- Unit: 295th Infantry Division
- Conflicts: World War II; Eastern Front; Operation Barbarossa; Battle of Stalingrad (POW)

Gerhard Bechly (born 1 July 1898 - 4 June 1968) was a lieutenant colonel in the Wehrmacht (German Army) who helped to establish the League of German Officers in September 1943 as a part of the German resistance to Nazism.

== Career ==
Gerhard Bechly was a professional soldier who rose to the rank of lieutenant colonel and adjutant in the 295th Infantry Division of the German Army.

In 1942, Lieutenant-Colonel Bechly was captured at the Battle of Stalingrad by the Soviet Army and became a prisoner-of-war at Lunjowo POW Camp 27, in Krasnogorsk, Moscow Oblast.

As a prisoner-of-war, he worked to establish the National Committee for a Free Germany (NKFD) on 12 July 1943.

Subsequently, through his leadership, the League of German Officers (BDO) was formed on 11/12 September 1943. Bechly served as co-founder and board member of the organization.

From 1943 to 1946, Bechly was a staff engineer at the Freies Deutschland newspaper and the Free Germany radio station.

The 295th Infantry Division was decimated from those who were killed in action at the Battle of Stalingrad and many thousands who died as prisoners-of-war. Of the 300,000 Germans who were involved with the Battle of Stalingrad, only about 6,000 lived to return to Germany. The survival rate was much higher for officers, and many of those who returned took positions in the new government of East Germany.

Bechly returned to Germany in September 1947, and in 1952, he joined the Kasernierte Volkspolizei (KVP, Barracks People's Police) and became its head of department in the 6th Management of Staff.

In 1956, Bechly became a colonel and the chief of staff of the 4th Administration of the East German Ministry of National Defence.

== League of German Officers ==
Shortly after the establishment of the National Committee for a Free Germany (NKFD), a recruitment campaign was envisioned for German officers who were held as prisoners-of-war in the Soviet Union. To facilitate the recruitment of these officers, the Bund Deutscher Offiziere (BDO, League of German Officers) was created on 11/12 September 1943. Starting with 95 officers in the Lunjowo POW camp, the BDO, with Soviet assistance, the BDO grew to well over 1000 German officers held at POW camps in the Soviet Union. The BDO greatly assisted the efforts of the National Committee for a Free Germany in providing propaganda as part of the German resistance to Nazi movement, which culminated with the assassination attempt on Adolf Hitler on 20 July 1944. After the war, the BDO was dissolved by Joseph Stalin on 2 November 1945.

== See also ==
- National Committee Free Germany
- German Resistance to Nazism
- National People's Army
- German Democratic Republic
