= Heinrich Graf von Einsiedel =

German journalist, politician and World War II Luftwaffe ace

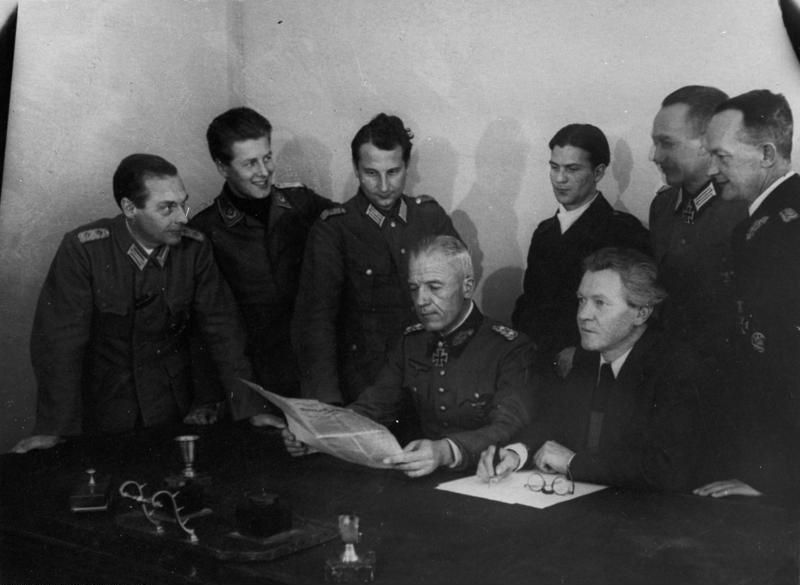
- Einsiedel can be seen second from the left at the NKFD council in 1943.
- Born: 26 July 1921; Potsdam, Province of Brandenburg, Weimar Republic
- Died: 18 July 2007 (aged 85); Munich, Germany
- Military career
- Allegiance: Nazi Germany (to 1942); East Germany (to 1948)
- Branch: Luftwaffe
- Service years: 1940-42
- Rank: Leutnant
- Units: Jagdgeschwader 2 Jagdgeschwader 3
- Conflicts: World War II
- Awards: German Cross in Gold
- Other work: Vice-President of the National Committee for a Free Germany; Journalist of Tägliche Rundschau; Member of the SDP; Candidate Member of PDS
- Spouse: Barbara Rütting (m. 1955; div. 1964)
- Relatives: Otto von Bismarck (Great-Grandfather)

Heinrich Graf von Einsiedel (26 July 1921 – 18 July 2007) was a German journalist, politician and World War II Luftwaffe ace.

== Early life ==
Einsiedel, a great-grandson of Otto von Bismarck, was born in Potsdam, Province of Brandenburg, as the youngest child to Count Herbert von Einsiedel (1885–1945) and his wife, Countess Irene von Bismarck-Schönhausen (1888–1982). His parents were divorced in 1931.

== World War II ==
In World War II, Einsiedel served as a German fighter pilot, initially with Jagdgeschwader 2 over the Western Front, flying the Messerschmitt Bf 109. He took part in escort operations over the cruisers Scharnhorst, Gneisenau and Prinz Eugen as they made their 'Channel dash' from Brest to Germany in February 1942. Einsiedel claimed two of the six Fairey Swordfish of No. 825 Squadron Fleet Air Arm, who made an unsuccessful low-level torpedo attack.

In June 1942, Einsiedel was transferred to Jagdgeschwader 3 on the Russian Front for the forthcoming offensive against Stalingrad. He was awarded the German Cross in Gold.

On 30 August 1942, during combat with Russian Ratas, he was forced to land, was captured by Russian ground forces and became a prisoner-of-war in the Soviet Union.

He became a founding member, vice-president and commissary of propaganda of the National Committee for a Free Germany.

=== Post-war Soviet Zone ===
Released after the war, Einsiedel initially worked for the Tägliche Rundschau, the German newspaper of the Soviet Military Administration in Germany but became increasingly disillusioned with the Soviet regime after he experienced first-hand corruption and inefficiency. He was given permission to visit West Berlin on behalf of the NKVD for intelligence-gathering purposes. While meeting his mother, he was arrested by US Forces and sentenced by an American court for spying and having forged documents. He was released on appeal. Despite a highly publicised press conference back in the East, he was by now seen as a liability by the Soviet authorities.

== West Germany ==
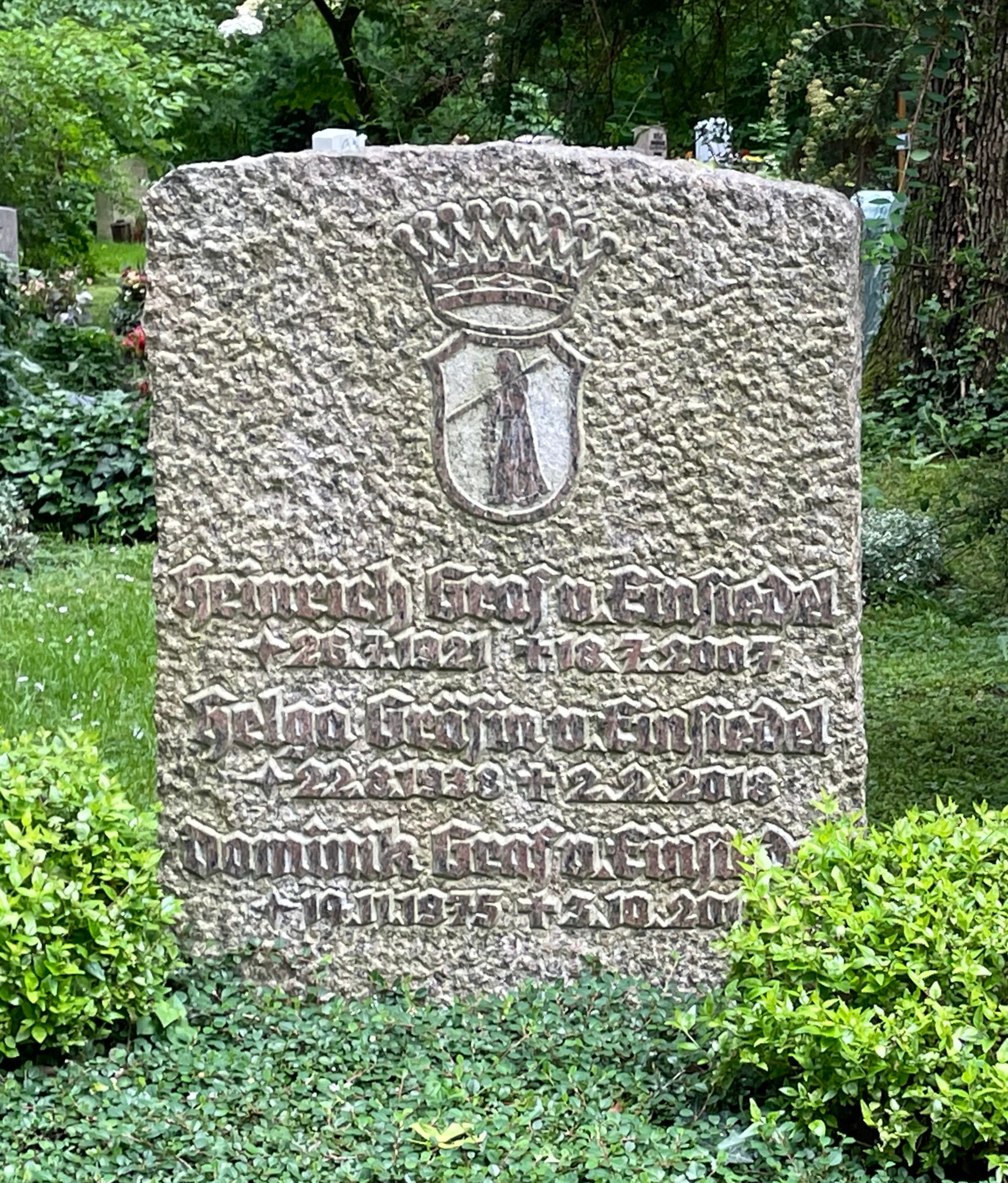
Grave in cemetery Haidhausen, Munich

He thus moved to West Germany in late 1948, where he worked as a translator, scriptwriter and journalist. The governing Socialist Unity Party of East Germany acknowledged Einsiedel as a bona fide anti-fascist but a petit bourgeois who, "as soon as the class war became acute", had wavered and switched political camps for his own self-interests.

Einsiedel wrote for the liberal Hamburg weekly, Die Zeit. He also wrote The Shadow of Stalingrad: Being the Diary of Temptation in 1953, which attempted to tell his complex story. Eventually, Einsiedel joined the film industry as a scriptwriter and a film soundtrack dubber. He also played the role of a pilot in the drama The Last Bridge (1953) with his first wife, Barbara Rütting.

He twice won the German bridge championship and played in the bridge World Cup.

Einsiedel was a member of the Social Democratic Party of Germany from 1957 to 1992 and was elected as a member of the German Bundestag as a candidate of the Party of Democratic Socialism (PDS) from 1994 to 1998.

Einsiedel died in Munich on 18 July 2007, aged 85.

== Summary of career ==
=== Aerial victory claims ===
Mathews and Foreman, authors of Luftwaffe Aces — Biographies and Victory Claims, researched the German Federal Archives and found documentation for 35 aerial victory claims, plus one further unconfirmed claim. This number includes two claims over the Western Allies, and 33 on the Eastern Front.

=== Awards ===
- German Cross in Gold on 25 August 1942 as Leutnant in the Stab of a Jagdgeschwader

== Literature ==
- Heinrich Graf von Einsiedel, Joachim Wieder: Stalingrad und die Verantwortung des Soldaten, ISBN 3-7766-1778-0 (German)
- Heinrich Graf von Einsiedel: Tagebuch der Versuchung. 1942 – 1950, 1950; Ullstein Paperback (1985): ISBN 3-548-33046-0 (German)
- Heinrich Graf von Einsiedel: Der Überfall, Hoffmann und Campe 1984, ISBN 3-455-08677-2 (German)
