= Walther von Seydlitz-Kurzbach =

German general (1888–1976)

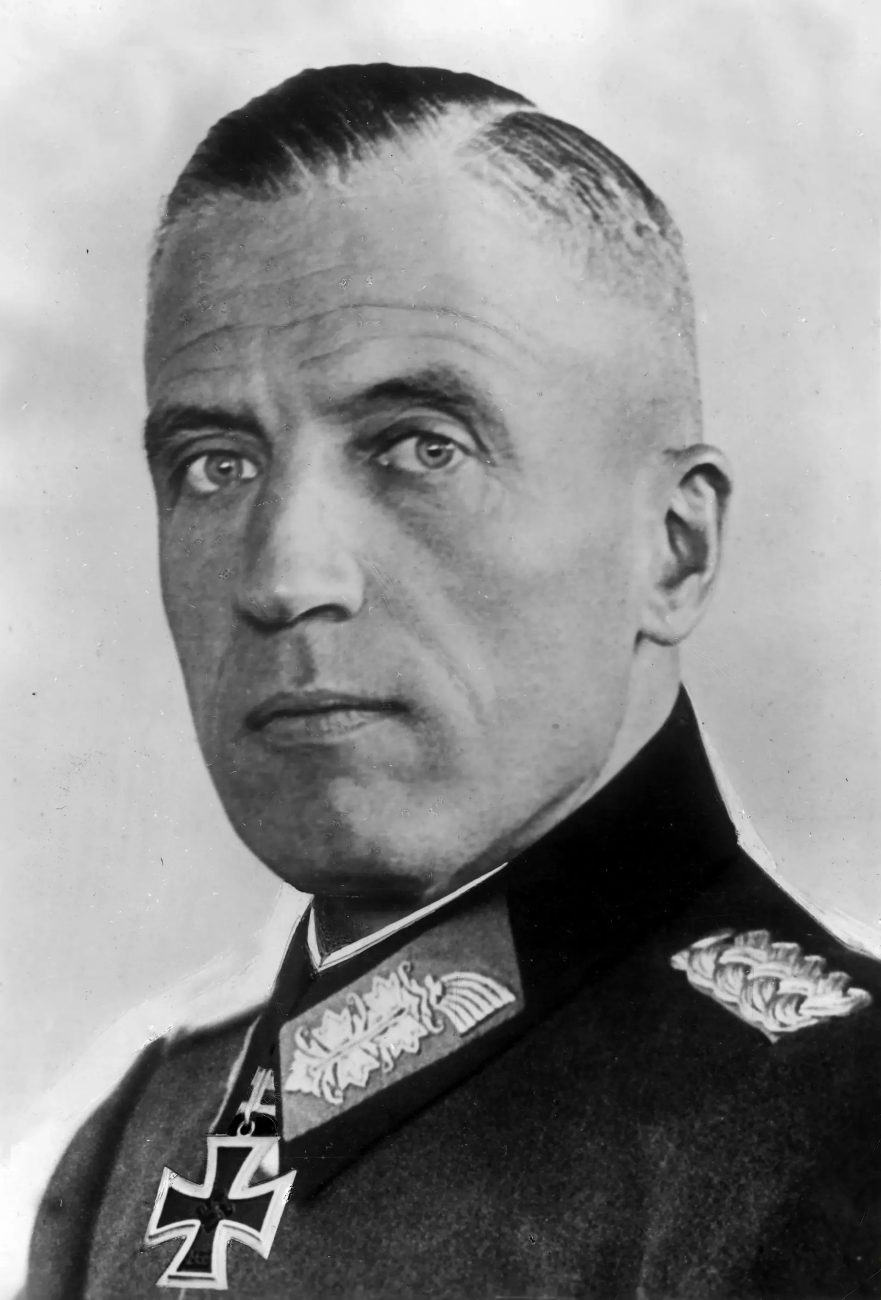
- Seydlitz-Kurzbach in 1942

Vice President of the National Committee for a Free Germany
- In office 12 July 1943 – 2 November 1945
- President: Erich Weinert
- Preceded by: Position established
- Succeeded by: Position abolished

President of the League of German Officers
- In office 14 September 1943 – 2 November 1945
- Preceded by: Position established
- Succeeded by: Position abolished

Personal details
- Born: 22 August 1888 Eppendorf, Hamburg, German Empire
- Died: 28 April 1976 (aged 87) Bremen, West Germany
- Awards: Iron Cross; House Order of Hohenzollern; Hanseatic Cross; Wound Badge; Wehrmacht Long Service Award; Knight's Cross with Oak Leaves

Military service
- Allegiance: German Empire; Weimar Republic; Nazi Germany; NKFD
- Branch/service: German Army
- Years of service: 1908–1943
- Rank: General der Artillerie
- Commands: 12th Infantry Division; LI Corps
- Battles/wars: World War I; World War II; Demyansk Pocket; Battle of Stalingrad

Walther Kurt von Seydlitz-Kurzbach (German: [ˈvaltɐ fɔn ˈzaɪdlɪts ˈkʊʁtsbax]; 22 August 1888 – 28 April 1976) was a German general during World War II who commanded the LI Army Corps during the Battle of Stalingrad. At the end of the battle, he gave his officers freedom of action and was relieved of command. He assisted the Soviet Union as a prisoner-of-war as one of the leaders of the National Committee for a Free Germany formed mostly of the German prisoners of war in the USSR. After the war, he was convicted by the Soviets of war crimes. In 1996, he was posthumously pardoned by Russia.

== Early life ==
Seydlitz-Kurzbach was born in Hamburg, Germany, into the noble Prussian Seydlitz family.

== Military career ==
During World War I, he served on both fronts as an officer. During the Weimar Republic, he remained a professional officer in the Reichswehr. From 1940 to 1942, he commanded the 12th Infantry Division of the German Army. When the division was encircled in the Demyansk Pocket, Seydlitz was responsible for breaking the Soviet cordon and enabling German units to escape from encirclement. For this action, he was promoted to General of the Artillery and appointed commander of the LI Corps.

The corps was subordinated to the Sixth Army during the Battle of Stalingrad. When the entire army was trapped in the city in the course of the Soviet Operation Uranus, Seydlitz was one of the generals who argued most forcefully in favour of a breakout or a surrender, against Hitler’s orders. On 25 January 1943, he told his subordinate officers that they were free to decide for themselves on whether to surrender. Friedrich Paulus immediately relieved him of command of his three divisions (the 100th, 71st and 295th Infantry Divisions).

A few days later, Seydlitz fled the German lines under fire from his own side with a group of other officers. He was taken into Soviet custody, where he was interrogated by Captain Nikolay Dyatlenko.

He was identified by his interrogators as a potential collaborator. In August 1943 he was taken with two other generals to a political re-education centre at Lunovo. A month later he was sent back to prisoner-of-war camps to recruit other German officers.

Seydlitz was a leader in the forming, under Soviet supervision, of an anti-Nazi organisation, the League of German Officers, and was made a member of the National Committee for a Free Germany. He was condemned by many of his fellow generals for his collaboration with the Soviet Union. He was sentenced to death in absentia by Hitler's government. Seydlitz's idea of creating an anti-Nazi force of some 40,000 German prisoners-of-war to be airlifted into Germany was never seriously considered. In Germany, his family was taken into Sippenhaft, detention for the crimes of a family member. Seydlitz was ultimately exploited by both Soviet and German propaganda. He was used by the former in broadcasts and literature to encourage German soldiers to surrender, and the latter cultivated the idea of "Seydlitz Troops" (German: Seydlitztruppen).

In 1949, he was charged with war crimes. He was put on trial for responsibility for actions against Soviet POWs and the civilian population while in Wehrmacht service. In 1950, a Soviet tribunal sentenced him to 25 years of imprisonment, but in 1955 he was released to West Germany, where in 1956, his Third Reich death sentence was nullified. However, he was despised by his former army colleagues both for his role in the Battle of Stalingrad and for his later collaboration with the Soviet Union. He was denied the restoration of his retired rank and pension by the Bundeswehr.

== Death ==
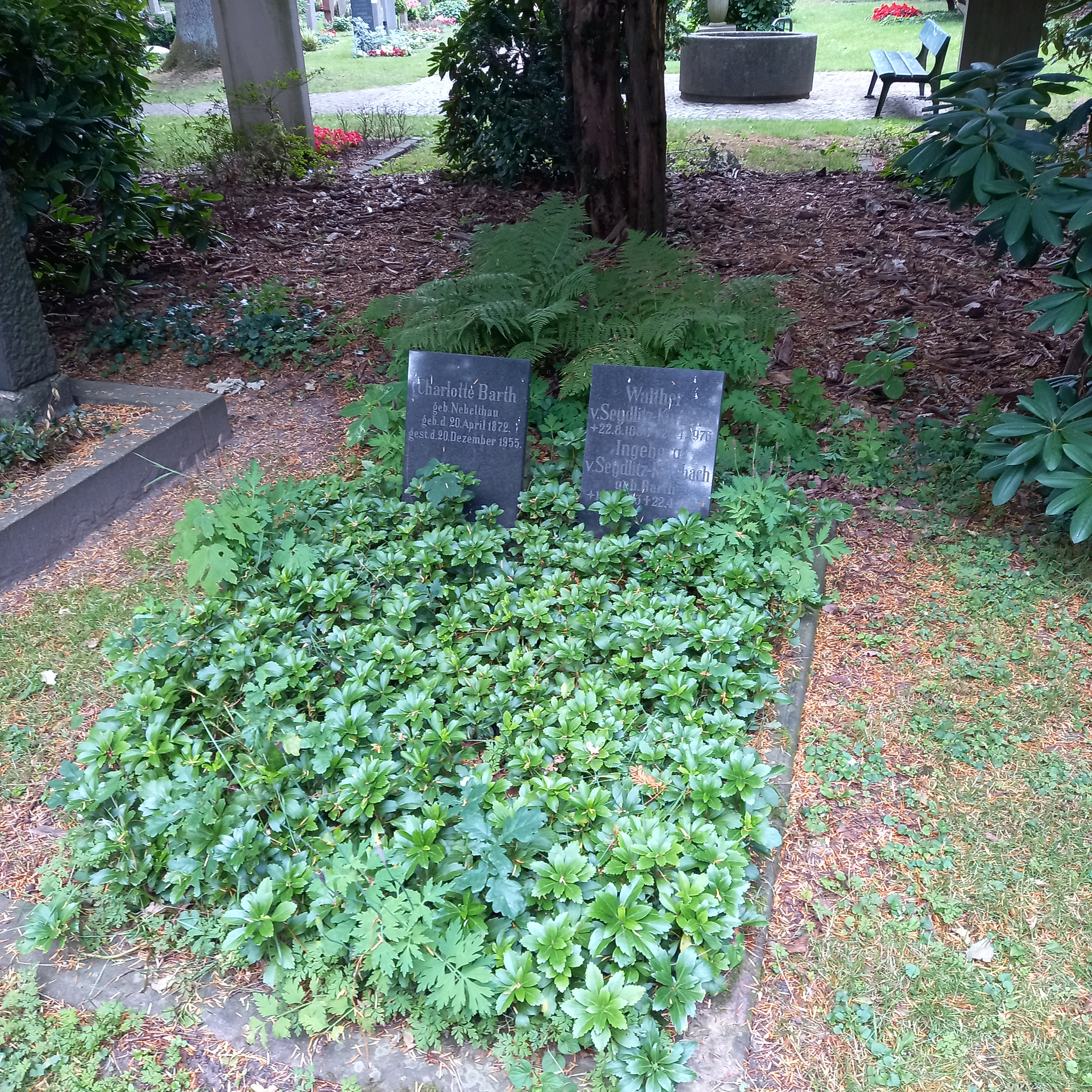
The grave of Walther von Seydlitz-Kurzbach and his wife in the Riensberg cemetery in Bremen

Seydlitz died on 28 April 1976 in Bremen. On 23 April 1996, a posthumous pardon was issued by the Russian authorities.

== Awards ==
- Iron Cross (1914) 2nd Class (19 September 1914) & 1st Class (21 October 1915)
- Knight's Cross of the Royal House Order of Hohenzollern with Swords (16 October 1918)
- Hanseatic Cross of Hamburg
- Wound Badge
- Wehrmacht Long Service Award, 4th with 1st Class
- Clasp to the Iron Cross (1939) 2nd Class (17 May 1940) & 1st Class (22 May 1940)
- Knight's Cross of the Iron Cross with Oak Leaves
  - Knight's Cross on 15 August 1940 as Generalmajor and commander of 12. Infanterie-Division
  - Oak Leaves on 31 December 1941 as Generalmajor and commander of 12. Infanterie-Division

Ribbon bar

Iron Cross with 1939 Clasp	Knight's Cross of the Royal House Order of Hohenzollern with Swords	Hamburg Hanseatic Cross	The Honour Cross of the World War 1914/1918	Wehrmacht Long Service Award 1st Class	Wehrmacht Long Service Award 3rd Class

== Bibliography ==
- Adam, Wilhelm; Ruhle, Otto (2015). With Paulus at Stalingrad. Translated by Tony Le Tissier. Pen and Sword Books Ltd. ISBN 9781473833869.
- Beevor, Antony (1998). Stalingrad. Viking, London. ISBN 978-0-14-103240-5.
- Scherzer, Veit (2007). Die Ritterkreuzträger 1939–1945 Die Inhaber des Ritterkreuzes des Eisernen Kreuzes 1939 von Heer, Luftwaffe, Kriegsmarine, Waffen-SS, Volkssturm sowie mit Deutschland verbündeter Streitkräfte nach den Unterlagen des Bundesarchives [The Knight's Cross Bearers 1939–1945 The Holders of the Knight's Cross of the Iron Cross 1939 by Army, Air Force, Navy, Waffen-SS, Volkssturm and Allied Forces with Germany According to the Documents of the Federal Archives] (in German). Jena, Germany: Scherzers Militaer-Verlag. ISBN 978-3-938845-17-2.
- Thomas, Franz (1998). Die Eichenlaubträger 1939–1945 Band 2: L–Z [The Oak Leaves Bearers 1939–1945 Volume 2: L–Z] (in German). Osnabrück, Germany: Biblio-Verlag. ISBN 978-3-7648-2300-9.

Military offices
Preceded by Generalleutnant Ludwig von der Leyen	Commander of 12. Infanterie-Division; 10 March 1940 – 1 January 1942	Succeeded by Oberst Karl Hernekamp
Preceded by General der Infanterie Hans-Wolfgang Reinhard	Commander of LI Army Corps; 8 May 1942 – 25 January 1943	Succeeded by Corps destroyed
