= National Committee for a Free Germany =

German anti-fascist organisation in the Soviet Union

National Committee for a Free Germany Nationalkomitee Freies Deutschland
- Other name: "Seydlitz Troops"
- President: Erich Weinert
- Vice-President: Walther von Seydlitz-Kurzbach
- Founded: 12 July 1943; 83 years ago
- Dissolved: 2 November 1945; 81 years ago
- Headquarters: Lunjowo POW camp 27, Krasnogorsk, Moscow Oblast
- Newspaper: Freies Deutschland [im Bild]
- Military wing: League of German Officers
- Ideology: Anti-fascism
- Political position: Big tent
- Part of: German resistance to Nazism: Free German Movement
- Allies: Soviet Union
- Opponents: Nazi Germany
- Battles and wars: Eastern Front of WWII: Rail War; Siege of Danzig; Courland Pocket; Battle of Königsberg; Siege of Breslau; Battle of Berlin (alleged)

Flag of the NKFD

The National Committee for a Free Germany (German: Nationalkomitee Freies Deutschland, NKFD) was an anti-fascist political and military organisation formed in the Soviet Union during World War II, composed mostly of German defectors from the ranks of German prisoners of war and also of members of the Communist Party of Germany who moved to the Soviet Union after the Nazi seizure of power. Although it initially conducted primarily propaganda and psychological warfare activities, later it formed small military units known as Combat Units (German: Kampfgruppen) and Partisan Units (German: Freischärlergruppen) which were sent to the Wehrmacht rear areas where they combined propaganda with collecting intelligence, performing military reconnaissance, sabotage and combat against the Wehrmacht, and to East Prussia, where they attempted to launch a popular guerrilla movement. Towards the end of the war its volunteers were sent to the front where they participated in combat with the Nazis. The creation of the organisation formed the Movement for a Free Germany, the anti-Nazi German movement in countries beyond Germany, including occupied Greece (AKFD) and France (KFDW).

== History ==
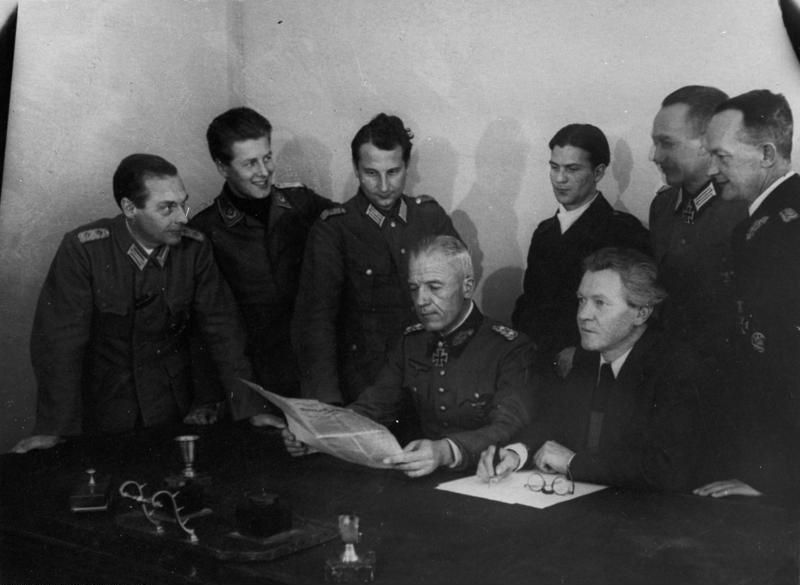
Members of the NKFD, including Hans-Günther van Hooven, Heinrich Graf von Einsiedel, Karl Hetz, Walther von Seydlitz-Kurzbach, Erich Weinert and Luitpold Steidle.

The rise of the Nazi Party to power in Germany in 1933 led to the outlawing of the Communist Party of Germany (KPD) and persecutions of its members, many of whom fled to the Soviet Union.

With the German invasion of the Soviet Union in Operation Barbarossa, German prisoners of war began to fall into Soviet hands. Attempts were made to establish an anti-Nazi organization from these POWs.

With the German defeat at the Battle of Stalingrad, the number of German POWs increased and their belief in a victorious Germany weakened, hence they were more open to the idea of membership of an anti-Nazi organization.

At the beginning of June 1943, Alfred Kurella and Rudolf Herrnstadt began writing a Committee manifesto. This text praised historical figures from the Kingdom of Prussia who had allied with Imperial Russia against Napoleon in the German Campaign of 1813; figures such as Heinrich Friedrich Karl vom und zum Stein, Carl von Clausewitz and Graf Yorck were depicted as exemplary Germans. The National Committee for a Free Germany (NKFD) was founded in Krasnogorsk, near Moscow, on 12 July 1943; its president was the exiled German communist writer Erich Weinert, with his deputies Lieutenant Heinrich Graf von Einsiedel and Major Karl Hetz. Its leadership consisted of 38 members, including 28 Wehrmacht POWs and 10 exiled communists including Friedrich Wolf.

=== League of German Officers ===
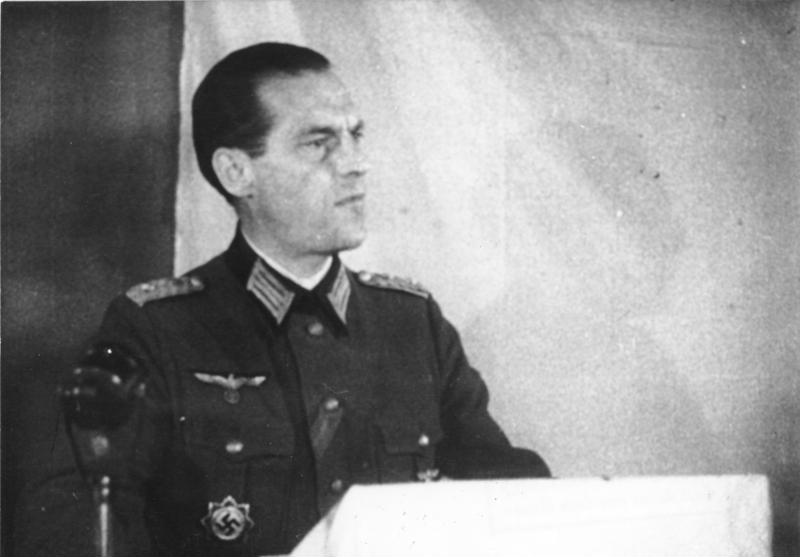
Colonel Hans-Günther van Hooven, photographed at the BDO foundation ceremony

After several failed attempts to recruit officers into the NKFD, it was suggested by Lieutenant-Colonel Alfred Brette that a special organization for officers be set up so that they would not have to come into contact with communists and common soldiers.

Two months after the founding of the NKFD, the League of German Officers (Bund Deutscher Offiziere, or BDO) was founded; its leader was General Walther von Seydlitz-Kurzbach. The main task of the BDO was to deliver propaganda aimed at the German armed forces. A number of officers held as Soviet prisoners of war eventually joined the BDO, the most prominent of them being Field-Marshal Friedrich Paulus, commander of the Sixth Army captured at the Battle of Stalingrad. The BDO later merged with the NKFD.

== Ideology and symbols ==
Variation of an NKFD member armband in colors of the Reichsflagge which was used by the Committee. The other variation had the letters "NKFD" instead of "Freies Deutschland" over the colors of the flag

During their discussions of Fascism, Nazism, the idea of a democratic government and the history of Germany, many prisoners of war said of their disgust or hatred towards the "weakness" of the Weimar Republic and that mainly because of this hatred they joined the NSDAP or even the SS. In one of his speeches, Ernst Hadermann, one of the leaders of the NKFD, insisted that by advocating democracy he did not intend a resurrection of the Weimar Constitution which he described as feeble. He described the principles of the NKFD as opposition to any Fascist dictatorship and imperialist war, support for unrestricted democracy, peaceful international cooperation, and respect for law and especially international law from a broad platform which united all the views presented in the NKFD, from the Communists to the conservatives among the POWs.

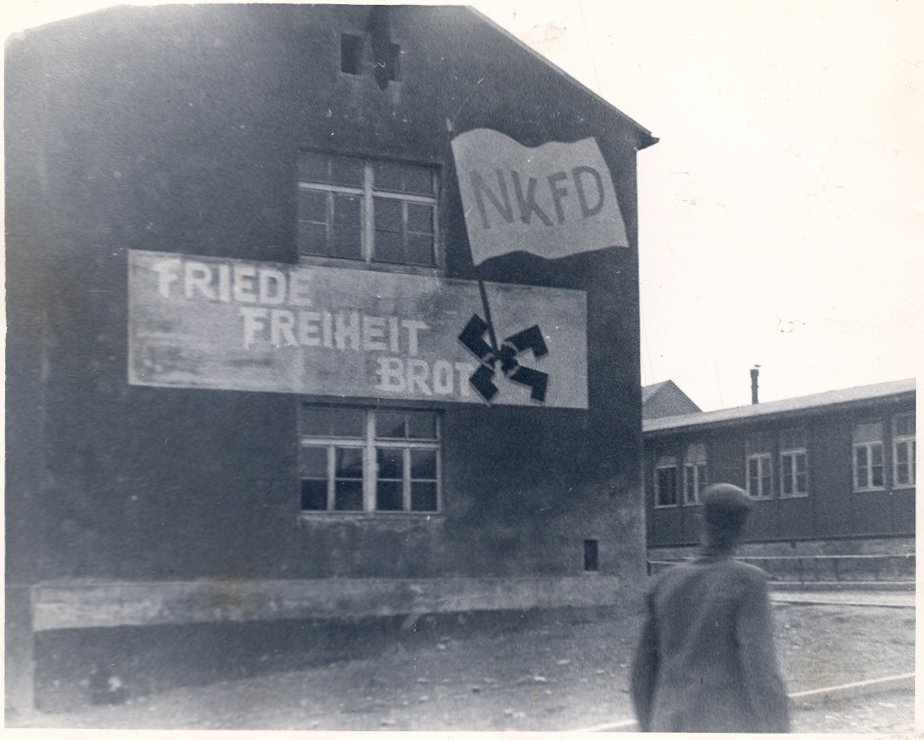
NKFD headquarters c. 1943–1945, promising Friede, Freiheit, Brot ("Peace, Freedom and Bread," a callback to Lenin's slogan of "peace, land, and bread")

These points along with the criticism of the Weimar Germany were added in the Manifesto of the NKFD; since the KPD was not fond of the Weimar Germany either, its members supported these criticisms. The Manifesto set a democratic "genuine German government" as one of its goals and contrasted this future "truly popular" government to the "powerless" Weimar Republic, as this government had to be strong to crush the remains of the Nazi regime. Criticism of Weimar Germany became one of the reason of the choice of the flag: the NKFD used the Reichsflagge,which was used by the German Empire and earlier the North German Confederation, the conservative politicians of the Weimar Republic and by the Third Reich during its first two years; the other reason for this choice was that the KPD leaders wanted to reassure its non-Marxist majority that the NKFD was not a Communist outfit but a union with all kind of views opposed to Nazism. However, after the war both the BRD and the DDR did not adopt this flag. The Politbureau of the KPD was split on this issue, with Anton Ackermann and Peter Florin voting against, while Walter Ulbricht and Wilhelm Pieck voted for the adoption of the flag.

== Activity ==
=== Propaganda and psychological warfare ===
The NKFD declared the overthrow of Hitler by the German people and a return to the borders of 1937 to be its main goals. Initially its main activities were political re-education, propaganda and psychological warfare aimed at the Wehrmacht. Seydlitz participated only in this side of the NKFD while disassociating himself from the armed struggle also conducted by the organisation, being the author and a spokesperson of pro-Soviet radio broadcasts and a parlimentaire while negotiating surrenders of German troops. The biggest action Seydlitz participated in as the leader of the NKFD was his involvement in the Battle of Korsun–Cherkassy, as Seydlitz and the other leaders of the NKFD urged the Germans to surrender and as Seydlitz established personal communications with German commanders of the operation to urge them to do so. The members of the NKFD were sent to the battlefield where they spread NKFD leaflets which served as safe conduct passes into captivity showing that the surrender was voluntary and that soldiers with such leaflets should be handed over to the NKFD. The operation was relatively successful, and out of the 18,200 captured Germans each third produced an NKFD leaflet. Seydlitz also proposed the creation of a pro-Soviet German army in German uniform, an analogue of the Vlasov army, but Stalin rejected this idea; in contrast, Stalin formed two Red Army divisions of Romanian prisoners of war after their request.

Despite that the overthrow of Hitler by the Germans was included in the Manifesto of the NKFD, the Soviet leadership initially viewed it as an auxiliary vehicle against the Wehrmacht, precisely, a propaganda tool that would make the Wehrmacht surrender and desert; the NKFD propaganda urged the Wehrmacht to turn their arms against their commanders and Hitler. Wilhelm Pieck until 1944 described the Wehrmacht as the only force that could overthrow Hitler. The work with the German civil population was left to the radio station Freies Deutschland, which engaged not only in the ideological indoctrination of its listeners, but also gave recommendations and instructions on waging partisan warfare and organizing anti-fascist Resistance, providing the examples of anti-Axis Resistance and partisan movements in other countries.

The NKFD also published the newspaper Freies Deutschland. The editor-in-chief of the newspaper was Rudolf Herrnstadt, whereas the radio program was directed by Anton Ackermann. The newspaper Freies Deutschland was just one of several Soviet publications aimed at Axis prisoners of war in the USSR; the effort placed into the German-language publication was, however, significantly larger than in its various sister projects: Alba (Italian), Word of Truth (Hungarian) and Free Voice (Romanian).

=== Combat Units and guerrillas of the NKFD ===
The other side was armed struggle, which, however, was not openly proclaimed when the organisation was formed. The NKFD had been forming small armed Combat Units, or Kampfgruppen since Summer 1943, and the first such unit was parachuted North-East of Pskov on 8 December 1943. Although these units were equipped with weapons, armed struggle was not their main purpose, and they were supposed to avoid any combat if possible: they were supposed to land in Wehrmacht rear areas and spread propaganda of their parent organisation and create NKFD groups within rearguard Wehrmacht units which would surrender to the Soviets at the front. Kampfgruppen constituted both of German and Soviet soldiers, but eventually they would be composed solely of Germans and participate in combat against the Wehrmacht towards the end of the war. After the first Kampfgruppe successfully landed, the Red Army requested them to carry out intelligence missions. As the captured German officers failed to justify their roles as Soviet "mouthpieces", the influence in the organisation had been flowing to the KPD leaders, and in January 1944, they announced the "second phase" of the movement. The main goal of the KPD was a creation of a popular partisan movement which would at least launch a full-scale guerrilla warfare in Germany if not mass anti-Nazi uprisings or even overthrow Hitler. Throughout 1944, Kampfgruppen and Freischärlergruppen (Partisan Units), along with carrying out tasks at the Soviet territories occupied by the Third Reich, were sent to East Prussia where they were expected to create such a movement. However, East Prussia turned out to be an extremely conservative and nationalist region, and the locals aided the authorities immeasurably with repressions against the NKFD partisans, so even if the idea of creating a partisan movement in Germany was not doomed from the start, the choice of the region determined its failure. After numerous attempts, Ulbricht admitted defeat only in March 1945. The failure of the attempt to create a popular anti-Fascist movement in Germany led to a moral decline and "crisis" within the NKFD.

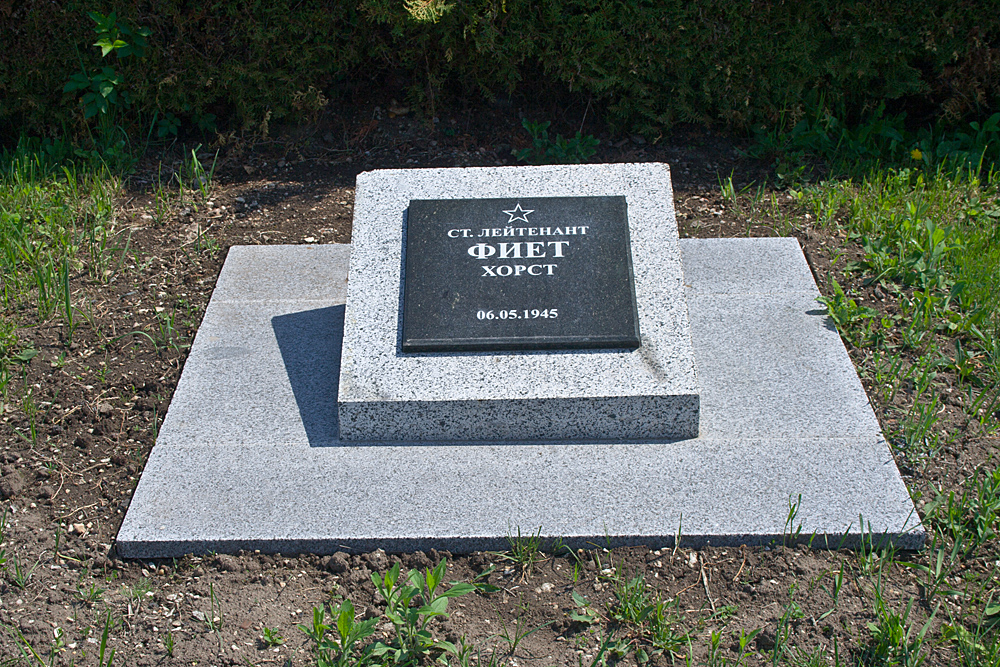
Grave of Lt. Horst Vieth killed in combat with Wehrmacht during the siege of Breslau

Although the attempt to create a partisan movement had failed, an independent NKFD group emerged in Cologne and was involved in some of the underground activity in over the fall and winter of 1944-1945. A few hundred German POWs in the United States and Britain, some of whom had joined the Freies Deutschland movement, helped the Western Allies organize several guerrilla and counter-guerrilla bands trained for parachute deployment in the Alps. One such operation, codenamed "Homespun," was broken up by the Sicherheitspolizei in April 1945. Apparently, Western and Southern Germany were more suitable for partisan activities than East Prussia.

Despite the "crisis", the NKFD continued operating and the volunteers kept joining the Kampfgruppen. As the Red Army stepped on German soil, the significance of the NKFD as a means to demonstrate the support of its invasion among the Germans had grown; the failure of the guerrilla warfare determined the Kampfgruppen being used for such activities such as commando operations, since these had a practical use for the Red Army as a means to harass and divert the Wehrmacht and did not require popular support at the same time. Hitler warned about the danger of the NKFD commandos in his final address to the Ostheer on 15 April 1945. Neither the KPD nor the BDO were enthusiastic about such forms of combat, but both factions of the NKFD leadership had lost their influence on the Soviet leadership by Spring 1945.

The first involvement of the Kampfgruppen in actions against the Wehrmacht was on 21 December 1943: as usual, it was given a task to reach a Wehrmacht rear area and spread propaganda, but failed to cross the frontline, so it joined a Soviet partisan unit and its assault on a German convoy of 25 trucks, guarded by tanks and armoured vehicles; partisans and the NKFD unit successfully destroyed 4 of the trucks and neutralized 72 soldiers; a similar situation happened in June 1944, when an NKFD unit after failing to complete propaganda tasks became attached to the 90th Rifle Division of the Red Army and conducted propaganda and reconnaissance activities, disrupted Wehrmacht communication lines, blew up bridges and captured German soldiers until December. After that, such tasks were given to the Combat Units directly when sending them. Although the NKFD leadership was obviously aware of the Kampfgruppen and although Seydlitz bid farewell to the first Kampfgruppe, they, apparently, were subordinate to the Red Army and the Central Staff for Partisan Warfare (the latter was dissolved in 1944), not to the leadership of the NKFD. During the last months of the war, the activities of the Kampfgruppen increased, and they were thrown into combat at the front; in Winter 1945, the NKFD volunteers which were allowed to form small commandos were given permission to form separate companies (no more than 100 men in each). There are clear evidences of the NKFD units participating in combat against the Wehrmacht in the Battle of Königsberg, siege of Breslau and in the Courland Pocket, as well as in the rather minor battles for Thorn and Graudenz and the siege of Danzig. Combat was still not the main purpose of the Kampfgruppen: they pretended to be scattered Wehrmacht soldiers and attempted to enter behind the German lines, and if the latter was successful, they persuaded the troops besieged by the Red Army to surrender, and if the latter refused, they participated in combat and withdrew. The combat in Breslau is one of the best known cases of the Kampfgruppen participating at the front, although not a successful one: the group successfully overpowered the guard posts and liquidated the SS commanders, but failed to capture the Wehrmacht soldiers, and the leader of the group, Horst Vieth, was killed on 5 May.

=== "Seydlitz Troops" ===
The name "Seydlitz Troops" was based on a myth circulated among the Germans that Seydlitz had his own military formation, an analogue of the Russian Liberation Army which fought on the side of the Nazis, but it became adopted by the German High Command to describe the alleged members of the NKFD, especially the ones who appeared at the front. Mainly this name was used to the "traitor officers" who appeared at the front and misled the army by issuing or orally giving false orders: for example, the Reich's Chancellery warned of the "Seydlitz Troops" in a circular, and Hermann Fegelein wrote to Himmler that he "came to the conclusion that a significant part of the difficulties on the Eastern Front, including the collapse and elements of insubordination in a number of divisions, stem from the cunning sending to us of officers from the Seydlitz Troops and soldiers from among the prisoners of war who had been brainwashed by communists". In response, Oberkommando des Heeres issued an order to Army Group Vistula that they take strong measures against any unknown or unauthorized German soldiers, officers or generals found in their area of operations, and the families of the members of the NKFD became subject to Sippenhaft; Friedrich Hossbach was dismissed from command over the 4th Army as Hitler accused him of being complicit with "Seydlitz officers" due to the withdrawal of his troops from East Prussia. The fear of an actual army composed of Wehrmacht POWs that would create a German communist state became widespread in Germany, and Hitler devised a plan of creating a conflict between the West and the USSR by making the Western Allies believe in the existence of such an army.

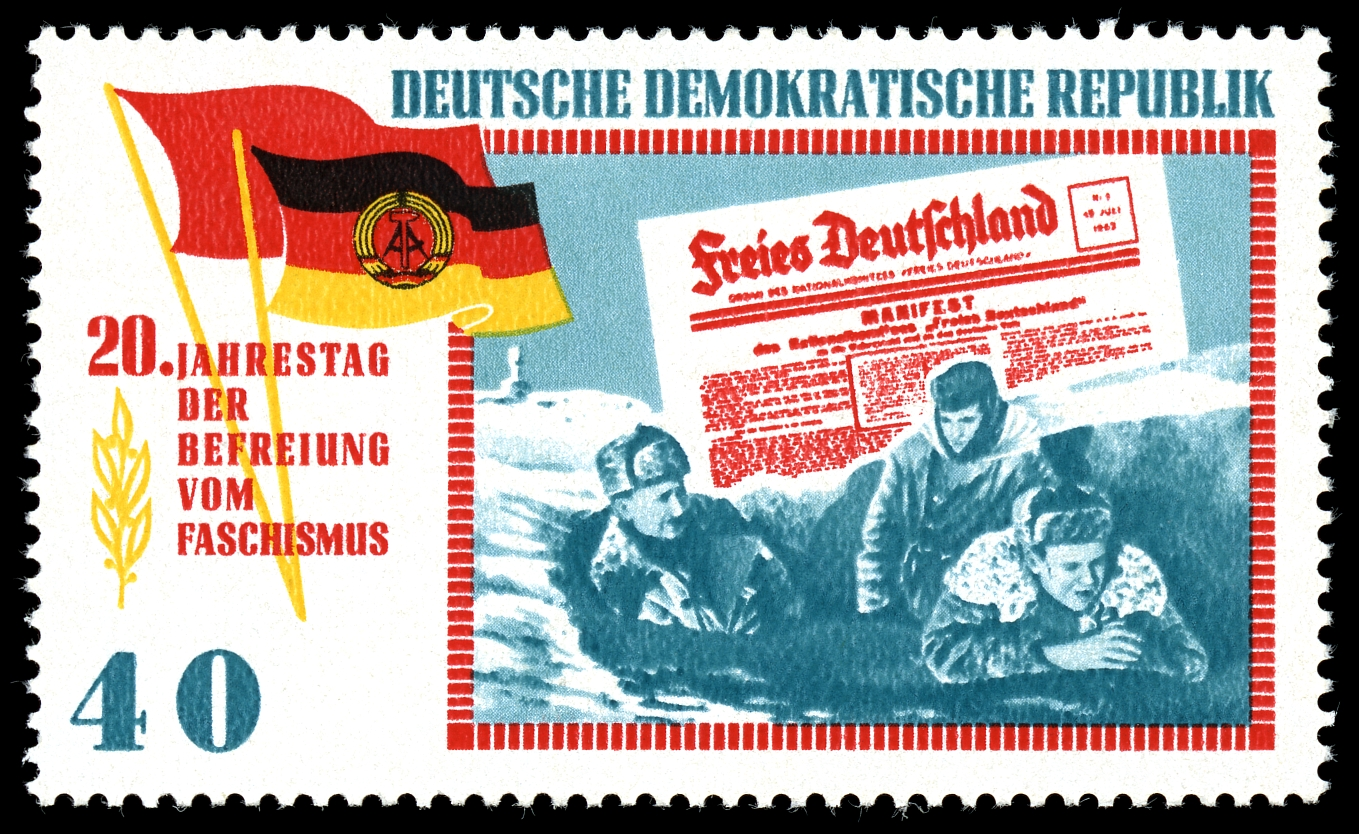
DDR commemorative stamp (1965)

There are several testimonies by the Germans who participated in the war that at the end of the war they met "Seydlitz Troops", and although usually they described suspicious officers who gave false orders, Western historians such as Stephan Hamilton and Tony Le Tissier also cite descriptions of Germans in Wehrmacht uniform directly fighting at the front alongside the Red Army, some of these mention the Freies Deutschland insignia. In March 1945, a whole "battalion" of Seydlitz men attacking the Wehrmacht was mentioned in a telephoned report to HQ 9th Army. There is no known "official documentary evidence" that would prove the German volunteers fighting alongside the Red Army during the Berlin offensive, but Le Tissier believes that these testimonies are enough to admit "that so-called Seydlitz-Troops were used in combat by the Soviets during the Berlin Operation" and the documentary evidence is "yet to be found".

== Branch groups ==
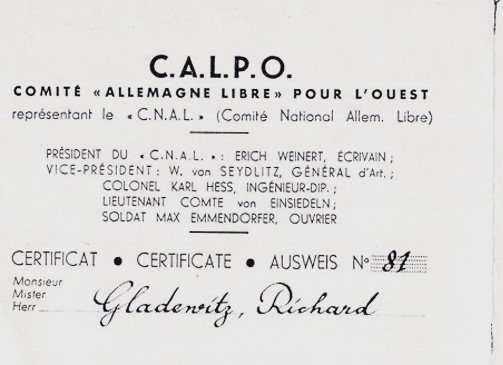
ID-card of a member of the Committee "Free Germany" for the West; on the card, the organisation is called the "representative" of the NKFD in German-occupied France

The NKFD was a part of a broader Movement for a Free Germany. Although this movement began before the creation of the NKFD, the latter profoundly affected the movement. Since 1943, participants of the movement, deserters from the Wehrmacht and German defectors, had been creating organisations modeled after the NKFD, the names of which also included the words "Committee" and "Free Germany". The best-known organisations of the movement were Anti-Fascist Committee for a Free Germany, organised by soldiers who defected to the Greek partisans, and Committee "Free Germany" for the West, which called itself the "representative" of the NKFD in German-occupied France.

== Post-war ==
After the defeat of Nazi Germany, NKFD members mostly returned to the Soviet occupation zone in Germany and had a key role in building the German Democratic Republic. Some BDO members had a key role in building the National People's Army, but others like Seydlitz were prosecuted as war criminals.

== Notable members ==
- Anton Ackermann
- Wilhelm Adam
- Johannes R. Becher
- Gerhard Bechly
- Otto Braun
- Willi Bredel
- Heinrich Graf von Einsiedel
- Wilhelm Florin
- Peter Gingold
- Edwin Hoernle
- Heinz Kessler
- Alfred Kurella
- Arno von Lenski
- Wolfgang Leonhard
- Hermann Matern
- Vincenz Müller
- Friedrich Paulus
- Wilhelm Pieck
- Theodor Plievier
- Hermann Rentzsch
- Willy Riedel
- Walther von Seydlitz-Kurzbach
- Walter Ulbricht
- Gustav von Wangenheim
- Erich Weinert
- Otto Winzer
- Friedrich Wolf
- Markus Wolf

== See also ==
- Tudor Vladimirescu Division and Horea, Cloșca și Crișan Division, formed of Romanian POWs
- Volunteer Regiment of Buda, formed of Hungarian defectors to the USSR
- Japanese People's Emancipation League, formed from Japanese POWs
- Russian Liberation Army and Committee for the Liberation of the Peoples of Russia, Nazi puppet armies formed from Russian POWs
- Anti-Nazi Freedom Movement
- Free Germany Movement, an organisation run by Otto Strasser that opposed Nazi Germany
