= Friedrich Paulus =

German field marshal (1890–1957)

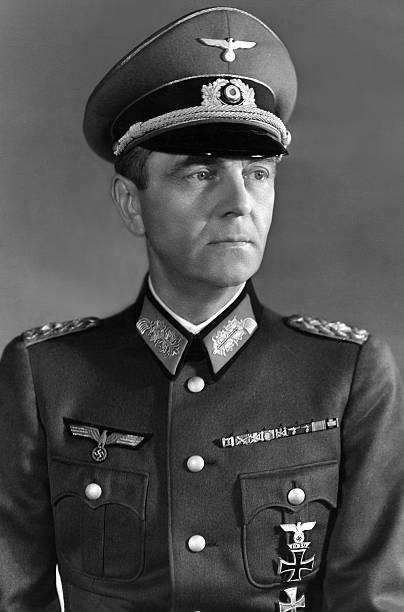
- Paulus in 1941
- Born: Friedrich Wilhelm Ernst Paulus; 23 September 1890; Breitenau (Guxhagen), Regierungsbezirk Cassel, Province of Hesse-Nassau, Kingdom of Prussia, German Empire
- Died: 1 February 1957 (aged 66); Dresden, East Germany
- Education: Marburg University
- Spouse: Constance Elena Rosetti-Solescu (m. 1912; died 1949)
- Military career
- Allegiance: Prussia; German Empire; Weimar Republic; Nazi Germany; NKFD; East Germany
- Branch: Prussian Army; Imperial German Army; Freikorps; Reichsheer; German Army; NKFD; Land Forces of the National People's Army
- Service years: 1910–1945; 1953–1956
- Rank: Generalfeldmarschall
- Commands: 6th Army
- Conflicts: World War I; France; Balkans; World War II; Invasion of Poland; Battle of France; Operation Barbarossa; Operation Blue; Battle of Voronezh; Battle of Stalingrad (POW)
- Awards: Knight's Cross of the Iron Cross with Oak Leaves

Friedrich Wilhelm Ernst Paulus (23 September 1890 – 1 February 1957) was a German Generalfeldmarschall (Field Marshal) during World War II who is best known for being the commander of the German 6th Army during the Battle of Stalingrad (July 1942 to February 1943). The battle ended in disaster for the Wehrmacht when Soviet forces encircled the Germans within the city, leading to the ultimate death or capture of most of the 265,000-strong 6th Army, their Axis allies, and collaborators.

Paulus fought in World War I and saw action in France and the Balkans. He was considered a promising officer; by the time World War II broke out, he had been promoted to major general. Paulus took part in the invasions of Poland and the Low Countries, after which he was named deputy chief of the German Army General Staff. In that capacity, Paulus helped plan the invasion of the Soviet Union.

In 1942, Paulus was given command of the 6th Army. He led the drive to Stalingrad but was cut off and surrounded in the subsequent Soviet counter-offensive. Adolf Hitler prohibited attempts to break out or capitulate, and the German defense was gradually worn down. Paulus surrendered in Stalingrad on 31 January 1943, (Note: Paulus claimed that "I didn't surrender. I was taken by surprise" in conversation with Marshal Voronov.) the day after he was informed of his promotion to field marshal by Hitler. Hitler expected Paulus to take his own life, repeating to his staff that there was no precedent of a German field marshal being captured alive.

While in Soviet captivity during the war, Paulus became a vocal critic of the Nazi regime and joined the Soviet-sponsored National Committee for a Free Germany. In 1953, Paulus moved to East Germany, where he worked in military history research. He lived out the rest of his life in Dresden.

== Early life ==
Paulus was born in Guxhagen and grew up in Kassel, Hesse-Nassau, the son of a treasurer. He tried, unsuccessfully, to secure a cadetship in the Imperial German Navy and briefly studied law at Marburg University.

Many English-language sources and publications from the 1940s to the present day give Paulus's family name the prefix "von". For example: Mark Arnold-Forster's The World At War, companion volume to the documentary of the same name, Stein and Day, 1973, pp. 139–142; other examples are Allen and Muratoff's The Russian Campaigns of 1941–1943, published in 1944 and Peter Margaritis (2019). This is incorrect, as Paulus's family was never part of the nobility and Antony Beevor refers to his "comparatively humble birth" .

== Military ==
After leaving university without a degree, Paulus joined the 3rd Baden Infantry Regiment "Margrave Ludwig Wilhelm" No. 111 in Rastatt as an officer candidate on 18 February 1910. On 4 July 1912, he married the Romanian aristocrat Constance Elena Rosetti-Solescu, a descendant of the Rosetti family and sister of a colleague who served in the same regiment. They had a daughter, Olga (1914–2003), who married Achim von Kutzschenbach (1904–1944), a member of the German nobility. In addition, they had twin sons Friedrich and Ernst Alexander (born 1918).

== World War I ==
When World War I began, Paulus's regiment was part of the thrust into France, and he saw action in the Vosges and around Arras in the autumn of 1914. After a leave of absence due to illness, he joined the Alpenkorps as a staff officer, serving in France, Romania and Serbia. By the end of the war, he was a captain.

== Interwar period ==
After the armistice ending Germany's involvement in World War I, Paulus was a brigade adjutant with the Freikorps. He was chosen as one of only 4,000 officers to serve in the Reichswehr, the defensive army that the Treaty of Versailles had limited to 100,000 men. He was assigned to the 13th Infantry Regiment as a company commander at Stuttgart. He served in various staff positions for over a decade (1921–33). In the 1920s, as part of the military cooperation between the Weimar Republic and the Soviet Union to evade the restrictions of Versailles, Paulus presented guest lectures in Moscow.

Later, Paulus briefly commanded a motorized battalion (1934–35). In October 1935, he was made chief of staff at Panzer Troop Command. This was a new formation under the direction of Oswald Lutz, which directed the training and development of the Panzerwaffe ("armored forces") of the German army.

== World War II ==
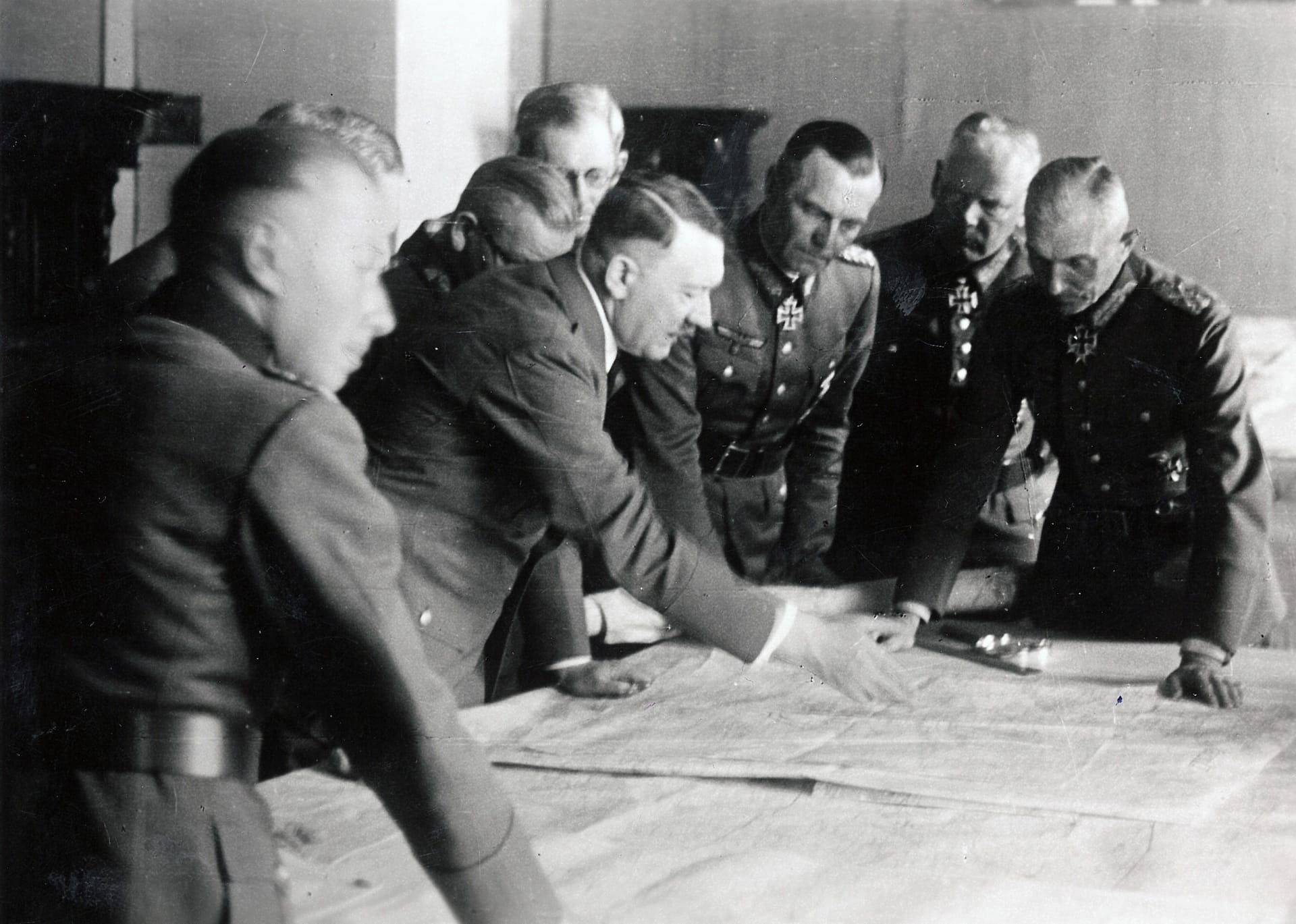
Paulus (third from right) attending a meeting at the headquarters of Army Group South with Adolf Hitler on 1 June 1942

In February 1938, Paulus was appointed Chef des Generalstabes to General Heinz Guderian's new XVI Army Corps, which replaced Lutz's command. Guderian described him as "brilliantly clever, conscientious, hard working, original and talented"; but Guderian had severe doubts about Paulus's decisiveness and toughness, and his lack of command experience. Paulus remained in that post until May 1939, when he was promoted to major general and became chief of staff for the German Tenth Army, with which he saw service in the invasion of Poland. The unit was renamed the Sixth Army and engaged in the spring offensives of 1940 through the Netherlands and Belgium. Paulus was promoted to lieutenant general in August 1940. The following month he was named deputy chief of the German General Staff (Oberquartiermeister I). In that role he helped draft the plans for the invasion of the Soviet Union, Operation Barbarossa.

=== Eastern Front and Stalingrad ===
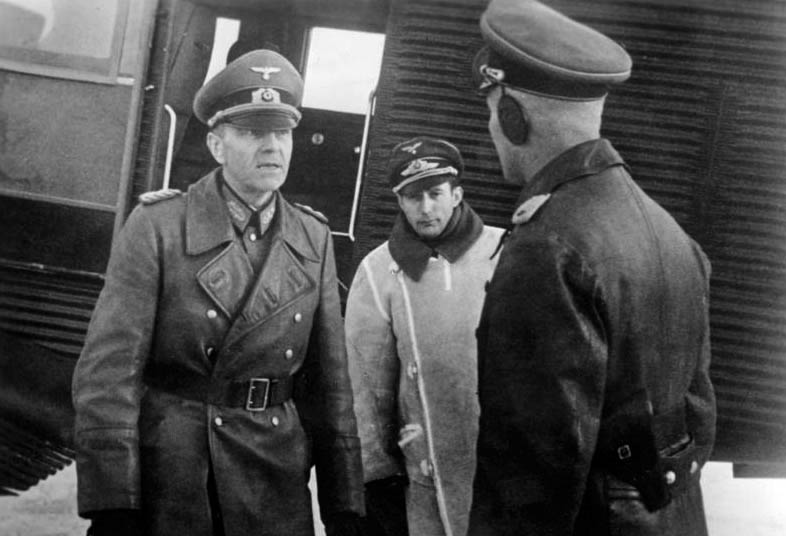
Paulus arriving in southern Russia, January 1942

In November 1941, after the German Sixth Army's commander, Field Marshal Walter von Reichenau, Paulus's patron, became commander of the entire Army Group South, Paulus, who had never commanded a larger unit than a battalion, was promoted to General der Panzertruppe and appointed commander of the Sixth Army. However, Paulus took over his new command only on 20 January, six days after the sudden death of Reichenau, leaving him on his own and without the support of his more experienced sponsor.

Paulus led the drive on Stalingrad that summer. His troops fought Soviet forces defending Stalingrad for over three months in increasingly brutal urban warfare. In November 1942, when the Soviet Red Army launched a massive counter-offensive, Operation Uranus, Paulus found himself surrounded by an entire Soviet army group. Paulus did not request to evacuate the city when the counter-offensive began.

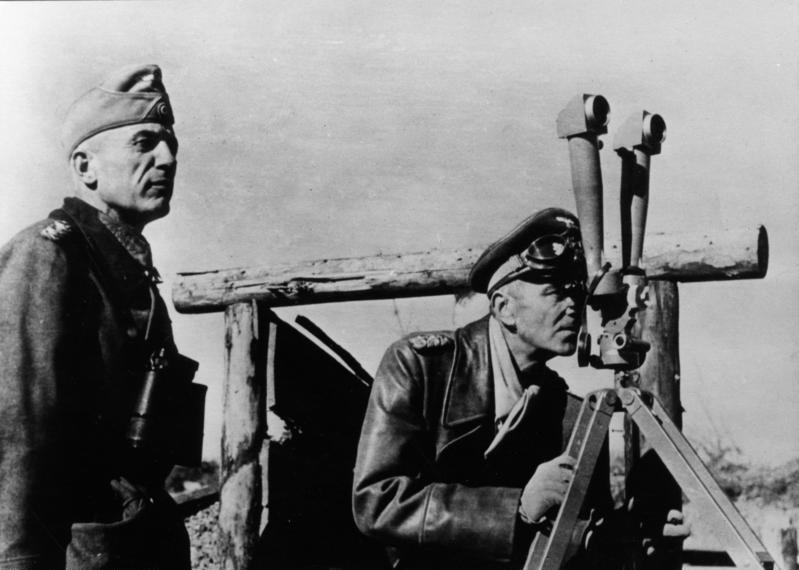
Paulus (right) with General Walther von Seydlitz-Kurzbach in Stalingrad, November 1942

Paulus followed Adolf Hitler's orders to hold his positions in Stalingrad under all circumstances, despite the fact that he was completely surrounded by strong Soviet forces. Operation Winter Storm, a relief effort by Army Group Don under Field Marshal Erich von Manstein, was launched in December. Following von Manstein's orders, Paulus prepared to break out of Stalingrad. In the meantime, he kept his army in fixed defensive positions. Manstein told Paulus that the relief would need assistance from the Sixth Army, but the order to initiate the breakout never came. Paulus remained firm in obeying the orders he had been given. Manstein's forces were unable to reach Stalingrad on their own and their efforts were eventually halted due to Soviet offensives elsewhere on the front.

Kurt Zeitzler, the newly appointed chief of the Army General Staff, eventually got Hitler to allow Paulus to break out—provided he continue to hold Stalingrad, an impossible task.

For the next two months, Paulus and his men fought on. However, the lack of food and ammunition, the equipment losses, and the deteriorating physical condition of the German troops gradually wore down the German defense. With the new year, Hitler promoted Paulus to colonel general.

About resisting capitulation, according to Adam, Paulus stated:

What would become of the war if our army in the Caucasus were also surrounded? That danger is real. But as long as we keep on fighting, the Red Army has to remain here. They need these forces for a big offensive against Army Group 'A' in the Caucasus and along the still-unstable front from Voronesh to the Black Sea. We must hold them here to the last so that the eastern front can be stabilized. Only if that happens is there a chance of the war going well for Germany.

==== Crisis ====
On 7 January 1943, General Konstantin Rokossovsky, commander of the Red Army on the Don Front, called a cease-fire and offered Paulus' men generous surrender terms: normal rations, medical treatment for the ill and wounded, permission to retain their badges, decorations, uniforms and personal effects. As part of his communication, Rokossovsky advised Paulus that he was in an impossible situation. Paulus requested permission from Hitler to surrender. Even though it was obvious the Sixth Army was in an untenable position, the German Army High Command rejected Paulus's request, stating, "Capitulation out of the question. Every day that the army holds out longer helps the whole front and draws away the Russian divisions from it."

After a Soviet offensive overran the last emergency airstrip in Stalingrad on 25 January, the Soviet command again offered Paulus a chance to surrender. Paulus radioed Hitler once again for permission. Telling Hitler that collapse was "inevitable", Paulus stressed that his men were without ammunition or food, and he was no longer able to command them. He also said that 18,000 men were wounded and were in immediate need of medical attention. Once again, Hitler rejected Paulus's request out of hand, and ordered him to hold Stalingrad to the death. On 30 January, Paulus informed Hitler that his men were only hours from collapse. Hitler responded by showering a raft of field promotions by radio on Paulus' officers to build up their spirits and bolster their will to hold their ground. Most significantly, he promoted Paulus to field marshal. In deciding to promote him, Hitler noted that there was no known record of a Prussian or German field marshal ever having surrendered. The implication was clear: Paulus was to commit suicide. Hitler implied that if Paulus allowed himself to be taken alive, he would shame Germany's military history.

==== Capitulation ====
Paulus and his staff surrendered on the morning of 31 January 1943. The events of that day were recorded by Colonel Wilhelm Adam, one of Paulus' aides and an adjutant in the XXIII Army Corps, in his personal diary:

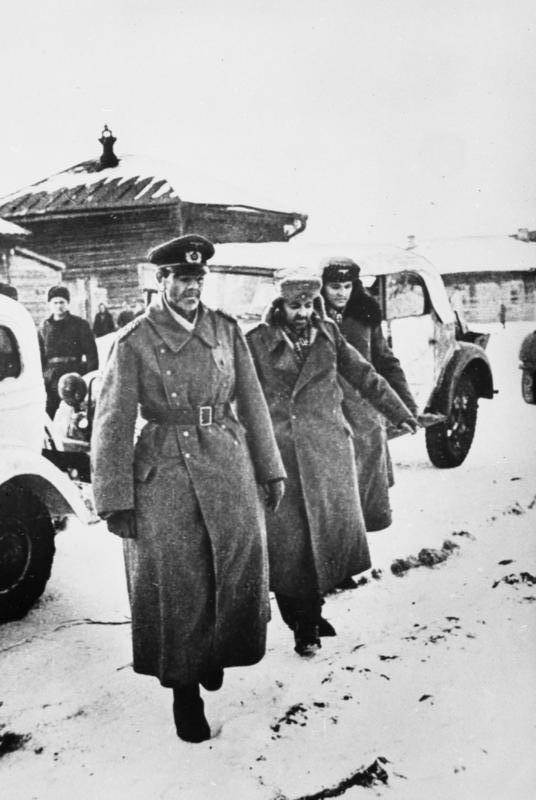
Paulus (left) and his aides Col. Wilhelm Adam (right) and Lt.-Gen. Arthur Schmidt (middle), after their surrender in Stalingrad.

January 31, 1943 – 7.00 a.m. It was still dark but day was dawning almost imperceptibly. Paulus was asleep. It was some time before I could break out of the maze of thoughts and strange dreams that depressed me so greatly. But I don't think I remained in this state for very long. I was going to get up quietly when someone knocked at the door. Paulus awoke and sat up. It was the HQ commander. He handed the colonel general a piece of paper and said: "Congratulations. The rank of field marshal has been conferred upon you. The dispatch came early this morning—it was the last one."

"One can't help feeling it's an invitation to suicide. However I'm not going to do them such a favour," said Paulus after reading the dispatch. Schmidt continued: 'At the same time I have to inform you that the Russians are at the door.' with these words he opened the door and a Soviet general and his interpreter entered the room. The general announced that we were his prisoners. I placed my revolver on the table.

"Prepare yourself for departure. We shall be back for you at 9.00. You will go in your personal car," said the Soviet general through his interpreter. Then they left the room. I had the official seal with me. I prepared for my last official duty. I recorded Paulus's new rank in his military document, stamped it with the seal then threw the seal into the glowing fire.

The main entrance to the cellar was closed and guarded by the Soviet soldiers. An officer, the head of the guards, allowed me and the driver to go out and get the car ready. Climbing out of the cellar, I stood dumbfounded. Soviet and German soldiers, who just a few hours earlier had been shooting at one another, now stood quietly together in the yard. They were all armed, some with weapons in their hands, some with them over their shoulders.

My God, what a contrast between the two sides! The German soldiers, ragged and in light coats, looked like ghosts with hollow, unshaven cheeks. The Red Army fighters looked fresh and wore warm winter uniforms. Involuntarily I remembered the chain of unfortunate events which had prevented me from sleeping for so many nights. The appearance of the Red Army soldiers seemed symbolic. At 9.00 sharp the HQ commander of the 6th Army arrived to take the commander of the vanquished German 6th Army and its staff towards the rear. The march towards the Volga had ended.

Paulus later claimed that he had not surrendered. He said that he had been taken by surprise. He denied that he was the commander of the remaining northern pocket in Stalingrad and refused to issue an order in his name for them to surrender.

On 2 February 1943, the remainder of the Sixth Army, in the Northern Pocket, capitulated. Upon finding out about Paulus's "surrender", Hitler flew into a rage and vowed never to appoint another field marshal again. In fact, he went on to appoint another seven field marshals during the last two years of the war. Speaking about the surrender of Paulus, Hitler told his staff:

In peacetime Germany, about 18,000 or 20,000 people a year chose to commit suicide, even without being in such a position. Here is a man who sees 50,000 or 60,000 of his soldiers die defending themselves bravely to the end. How can he surrender himself to the Bolshevists?!

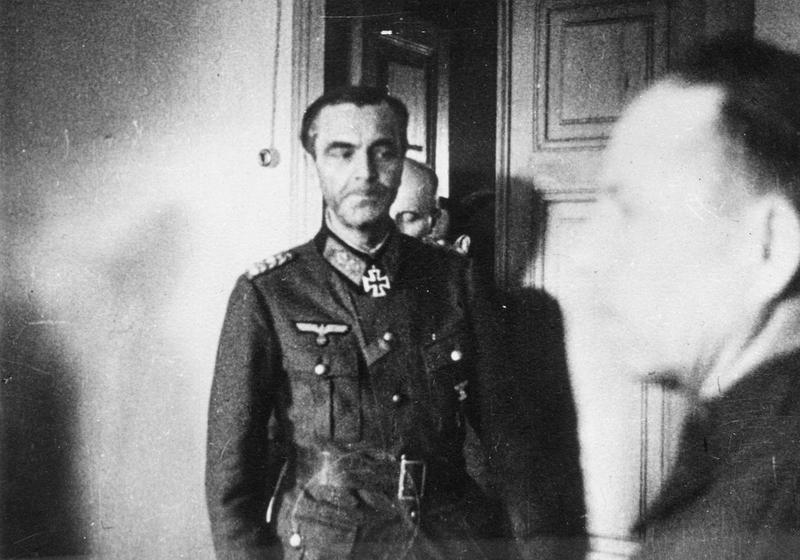
Field Marshal Friedrich Paulus surrenders to the Soviets at the 64th Army HQ, 31 January 1943

Paulus, a Roman Catholic, was opposed to suicide. During his captivity, according to General Max Pfeffer, Paulus said, "I have no intention of shooting myself for this Bohemian corporal." Paulus also forbade his soldiers from standing on top of their trenches in order to be shot by the enemy.

Shortly before surrendering, Paulus sent his wedding ring back to his wife on the last plane departing his position. He had not seen her since 1942 and would not see her again, as she died in 1949 while he was still in captivity.

== After Stalingrad and post-war era ==
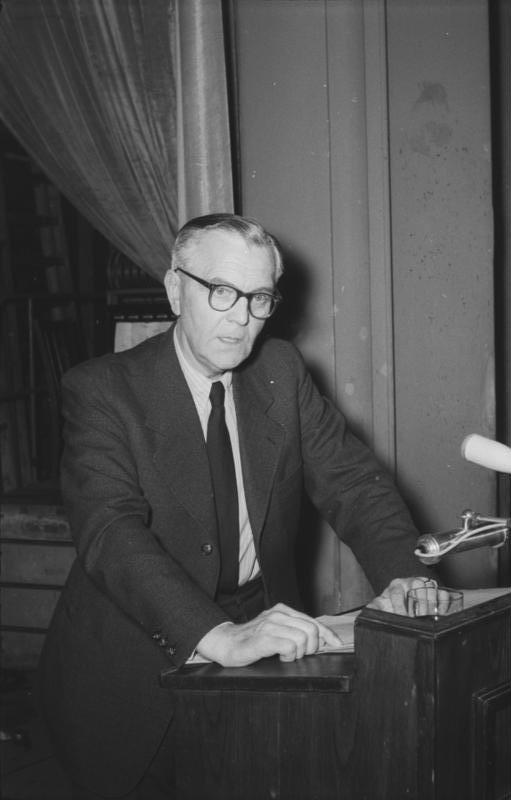
Paulus speaking at a press conference in East Berlin, 2 July 1954.

At first, Paulus refused to collaborate with the Soviets. However, after the attempted assassination of Hitler on 20 July 1944, he became a vocal critic of the Nazi regime, joining the Soviet-sponsored National Committee for a Free Germany, which appealed to Germans to surrender. These actions subjected his wife, as well as his daughter Olga von Kutzschenbach, to Sippenhaft, or collective familial punishment. He later acted as a witness for the prosecution at the Nuremberg Trials. He was allowed to move to the German Democratic Republic in 1953, two years before the repatriation of the remaining German POWs.

During the Nuremberg Trials, Paulus was asked about the Stalingrad prisoners by a journalist. He told the journalist to tell the wives and mothers that their husbands and sons were well. However, of the 100,000 German prisoners taken at Stalingrad, half had died on the march to Siberian prison camps, and nearly as many died in captivity; only about 6,000 survived and returned home.

After his return to the German Democratic Republic in 1953, Paulus gave a talk in Berlin on 2 July 1954 in the presence of Western journalists, titled "On the vital issues of our nation". In it, he paid respect to the memory of General Heinz Guderian, who had died a little over a month previously, and criticized the political leaderships of the German Empire and Nazi Germany for causing the defeats of the German Army in both world wars:

I have in mind in particular General Guderian, who died prematurely, and with whom I was particularly close, as chief of staff for the organization of the armored troops, and we were carrying out a task together. Maybe since the last time we met—more than 10 years ago—our views on specific issues differed, but I know in general, through his writings, with what sense of responsibility, how restlessly he refused to align himself with the Federal Chancellor's European Defence Community policy. He was, in any case, a defender of a united and sovereign Germany. Everyone knows that our nation used to have great military experts, known all over the world, such as Clausewitz, Moltke the Elder, Schlieffen. Certainly, in their time they assessed the political–military situation of Germany with perseverance and sobriety, developed principles and positions for the strategy and tactics of a general nature, which were valid for the special situation in which Germany would be in a state of war. There are still many people today who wonder how Germany, which no doubt possessed a highly trained army, could be defeated in two wars. The question cannot be answered in military terms. The governments responsible for this have both put their armed forces in front of insoluble problems. Even the best army is doomed to fail when it is required to perform impossible tasks, that is, when it is ordered to campaign against the national existence of other peoples.

He also criticized United States foreign policy as aggressive and called for a reconciliation between the Germans and the French:

American policy today calls itself "power politics". For us Germans, this is particularly indicative. We have been punished for pursuing the policy of violent and lightning strikes that is now being cultivated, and we know what it has cost us. We Germans have seen that in the 20th century, such "power politics" that a strong and rich country seeks to pursue at the expense of other countries is doomed to failure. This policy can have no prospect of success unless it manages to stifle the national will of other peoples, to crush their independence. But it is a misconception and dangerous idea that the age of nations is over simply because a power, the United States, relies on this position so that it can bend over and dominate other nations at the lowest cost to it. Establishing good neighborly relations with the countries that surround us from east and west is crucial for our national existence. I have in mind, first of all, France. The time has come for the old enmity that we have inherited and the many disputes to be buried once and for all. These two peoples must put aside all conflicts between them, all the more so because German-French relations are the link in the dangerous chain held by the Americans to turn one European people against the other and use them as a vehicle for their own policy.

Finally, he supported former German Chancellor Heinrich Brüning's appeal for a betterment of relations between West Germany and the Eastern Bloc, agreed with Brüning's criticism of West German Chancellor Konrad Adenauer's overtly pro-American policy, and expressed his hope for a German reunification:

Chancellor Brüning took a clear stand against Chancellor Adenauer's rigid orientation to the West, and practically against the EDC and the Bonn conventions. Like many West German economists and politicians, he was in favor of taking advantage of the slightest opportunity to negotiate with the East. Thus, another prominent and experienced German politician stressed that a final implementation of the EDC agreement would be dangerous for the German nation. No sensible person can understand why Dr. Adenauer, under American influence, strongly opposes exploiting the opportunities for the resumption of economic and cultural relations with the peoples of the East.

As a former military man and commander of a large sector, taking into account the current situation and based on my experiences, I have come to the conclusion that we must definitely take the path that, in any form, leads to the development and consolidation of relations between East and West. Only we Germans can decide the future of Germany.

When I say that we Germans must focus above all on the unity and independence of Germany, on the affirmation of the vital national rights of our nation, I realize that in this way we are best serving the cause of peace, of international détente and reconciliation between peoples. We want good relations between the German people and other peoples who respect our national rights. This is the precondition for collective security in Europe and at the same time for a happy future for our own nation. With a reunited Germany having good relations with the two great powers, not only can peace not be disrupted in Europe, but the basis for the development of general prosperity is laid.

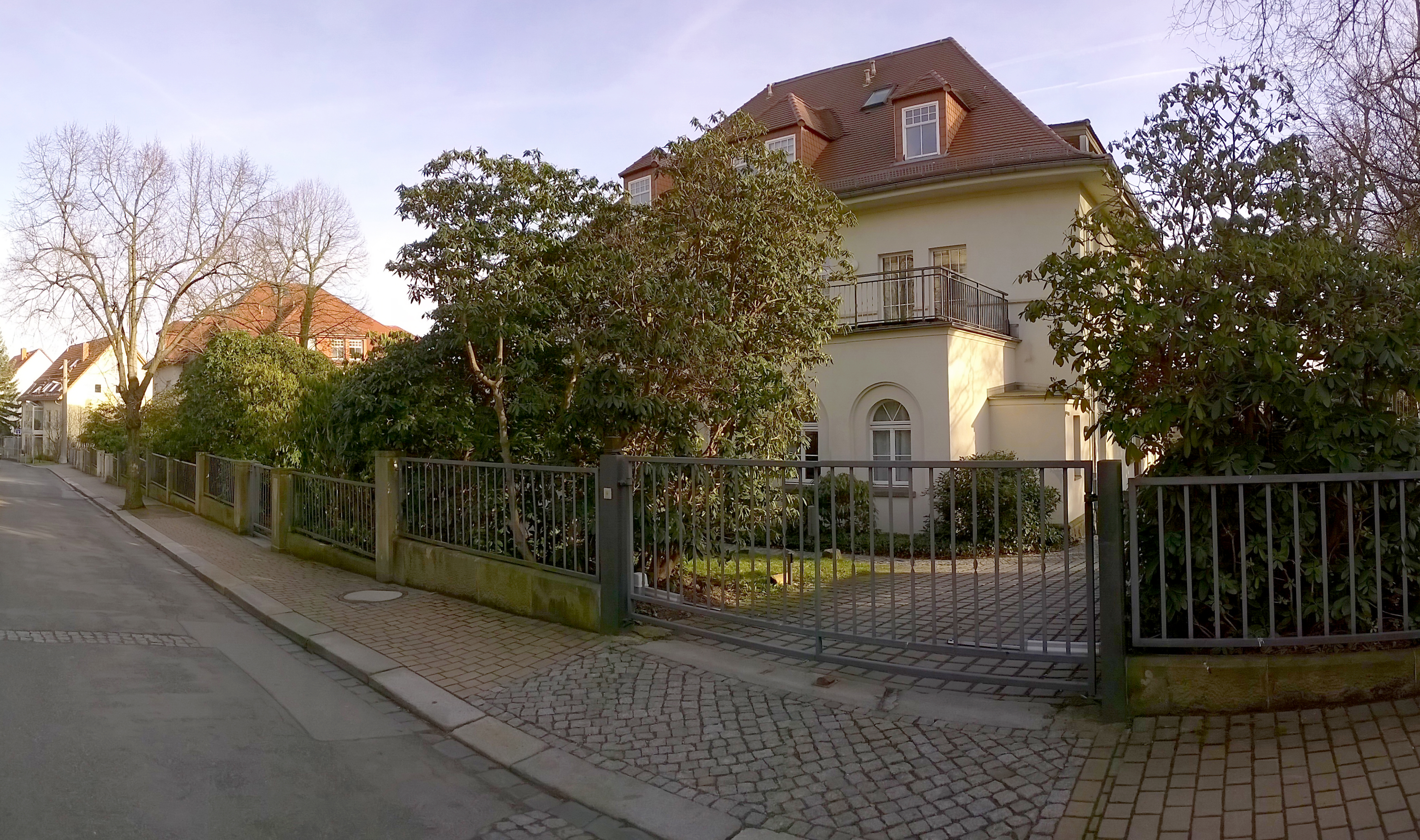
Paulus's villa in Dresden-Oberloschwitz (2017)

From 1953 to 1956, Paulus lived in Dresden, East Germany, where he worked as the civilian chief of the East German Military History Research Institute. In late 1956, he was diagnosed with amyotrophic lateral sclerosis and became progressively weaker.

== Death ==
He died a few months later, in Dresden, on 1 February 1957, aged 66. As part of his last will and testament, his body was transported to Baden-Baden, West Germany, to be buried at the Hauptfriedhof (main cemetery) next to his wife.

== Promotions ==
- 18 February 1910 Fahnenjunker (Officer Candidate)
- 18 October 1910 Fähnrich (Officer Cadet)
- 18 August 1911 Leutnant (2nd Lieutenant) with Patent from 20 August 1909
- 18 August 1915 Oberleutnant (1st Lieutenant)
- 20 September 1918 Hauptmann (Captain)
- 1 February 1931 Major with Rank Seniority (RDA) from 1 February 1929
- 1 June 1933 Oberstleutnant (Lieutenant Colonel)
- 1 June 1935 Oberst (Colonel)
- 1 January 1939 Generalmajor (Major General)
- 1 August 1940 Generalleutnant (Lieutenant General)
- 1 January 1942 General der Panzertruppe
- 1 January 1943 Generaloberst with RDA from 30 November 1942
- 30 January 1943 Generalfeldmarschall

== Awards and decorations ==
- Iron Cross of 1914, 1st and 2nd class
- Military Merit Order, 4th class with Swords (Bavaria)
- Knight's Cross Second Class of the Order of the Zähringer Lion with swords
- Military Merit Cross, 1st and 2nd class (Mecklenburg-Schwerin)
- Cross for Merit in War (Saxe-Meiningen)
- Military Merit Cross, 3rd class with War Decoration (Austria-Hungary)
- The Honour Cross of the World War 1914/1918, with Swords
- Clasp to the Iron Cross (1939)
  - 1st Class (21 September 1939)
  - 2nd Class (27 September 1939)
- Knight's Cross of the Iron Cross with Oak Leaves
  - Knight's Cross on 26 August 1942 as General der Panzertruppe and Commander-in-chief of the 6. Armee
  - 178th Oak Leaves on 15 January 1943 as Generaloberst and Commander-in-chief of the 6. Armee
- Order of the Cross of Liberty, 1st class with Oak Leaves and Swords (Finland)
- Order of Michael the Brave, 1st class (Romania)
- Military Order of the Iron Trefoil, First Class with Oak Leaves, (Independent State of Croatia)

== Notes ==
Military offices
Preceded by Generalfeldmarschall Walther von Reichenau	Commander of 6. Armee; 30 December 1941 – 3 February 1943	Succeeded by General Karl-Adolf Hollidt
