= Wilhelm Adam =

German military officer and politician (1893–1978)

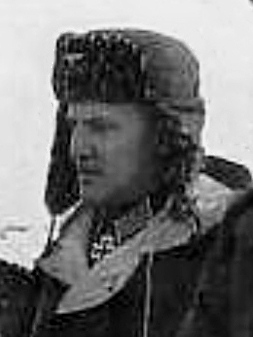
- Adam in captivity at Stalingrad (4 February 1943)

Minister of Finance State of Saxony
- In office 24 November 1950 – 23 July 1952
- Prime Minister: Max Seydewitz
- Preceded by: Carl Ulbricht
- Succeeded by: Position abolished

Volkskammer Deputy
- In office 19 April 1950 – 20 October 1963

Personal details
- Born: 28 March 1893 Eichen, Hesse-Nassau, Kingdom of Prussia, German Empire
- Died: 24 November 1978 (aged 85) Dresden, East Germany
- Party: National Democratic Party of Germany
- Other political affiliations: Young German Order; Nazi Party; German People's Party; National Committee for a Free Germany
- Known for: Member of the NKFD
- Civilian awards: Blood Order

Military service
- Allegiance: German Empire; Weimar Republic; Nazi Germany; East Germany
- Branch/service: Imperial German Army; Reichswehr; Wehrmacht; National People's Army (NVA)
- Years of service: 1913–1919; 1934–1945; 1952–1958
- Rank: Leutnant (Imperial German Army); Hauptmann (Reichswehr); Oberst (Wehrmacht); Generalmajor (NVA)
- Unit: 6th Army
- Battles/wars: World War I World War II: Battle of Stalingrad (POW)
- Military awards: Knight's Cross of the Iron Cross

Wilhelm Adam (28 March 1893 – 24 November 1978) was a German schoolteacher who fought as an officer in both world wars, in the Imperial German Army of the German Empire and in the Wehrmacht of Nazi Germany. Following the German defeat at the Battle of Stalingrad in World War II, he was taken prisoner by the Red Army and became a member of the National Committee for a Free Germany. Adam later served in the National People's Army of East Germany. Also active in politics, he served as the finance minister in the state of Saxony and as a deputy in the East German Volkskammer.

== Early life and World War I ==
Adam was born in 1893 in Eichen (today, part of Nidderau), the son of a farmer. After completing his secondary education, he attended the teacher training school in Schlüchtern from 1908 to 1913. In October 1913, he entered military service as a one-year volunteer with the 88th (2nd Nassau) Infantry Regiment. At the outbreak of the First World War, he was deployed to the western front as a Gefreiter in August 1914. He was wounded on 16 September and treated at a military hospital in Düsseldorf. He was reassigned to his regiment's reserve battalion and, in April 1915, was promoted to Feldwebel. From April to May 1915, he participated in an officer training course and received his commission as a Leutnant on 22 May. He was made a platoon leader in the XVI Army Corps and he served with the 30th (4th Rhenish) Infantry Regiment from October 1915. In July 1916, he was transferred back to 88th Infantry Regiment and, in September 1916, he became the commander of a machine-gun company in Infantry Regiment 424. From October onward, Adam served as an orderly officer with the 70th Landwehr Infantry Brigade. Following the end of the war, he was discharged from the army in January 1919, having earned the Iron Cross, 1st and 2nd class.

== Career in the inter-war years ==
Returning to civilian life, Adam worked as an elementary school teacher from 1919 to 1929 in Langenselbold. Concurrently, from 1922 to 1924, he studied at the University of Frankfurt am Main and, in 1927, passed the state examination to qualify as a middle school teacher. He joined the Langenselbold Militärverein (military association) in 1919 and was a member of the Young German Order from 1920 to 1923. In 1923, Adam joined the Nazi Party and participated in the failed Beer Hall Putsch in November of the same year, for which he later would be awarded the Blood Order. After the Party was banned, he did not rejoin it following its re-establishment in 1925. In 1926, he joined the German People's Party, remaining a member until 1929. From 1929 to 1934, he taught mathematics at the Army Technical School in Weimar.

In 1933, Adam became a member of Der Stahlhelm, the militant German veterans' association and, following its incorporation into the Nazi Sturmabteilung(SA) in February 1934, he joined the newly formed SA-Reserve I, composed of former Stahlhelm members. He held the rank of SA-Oberscharführer and was assigned to the department for ideological training on the staff of SA-Standarte 94 in Weimar. In 1934, Adam was recalled to active military service in the Reichswehr with the rank of Hauptmann. Following courses at a Kriegsschule (war school), he was promoted to Major on 1 January 1938. Until 1939, he served as an instructor at the Döberitz military training area, and subsequently at the Kriegsschule in Dresden.

== World War II ==
In 1939, Adam was appointed an adjutant in the XXIII Army Corps, under Walther von Reichenau. In March 1941, he was promoted to Oberstleutnant and was deployed to the eastern front as the chief adjutant of the 6th Army under Friedrich Paulus. He was promoted to the rank of Oberst in March 1942 and participated in the Battle of Stalingrad, being awarded the Knight's Cross of the Iron Cross on 17 December 1942. On 31 January 1943, Adam was made a prisoner of war by the Red Army after the surrender of the 6th Army in Stalingrad. He was interrogated by Nikolay Dyatlenko. While in captivity, he went to the Central Anti-Fascist School at Krasnogorsk. He became a member of the National Committee for a Free Germany in 1944. A Nazi court sentenced him to death in absentia.

Concerning the war, Adam stated, "That the Second World War started by Hitler's Germany was a crime not only against the peoples attacked by us, but also against the German nation, did not occur to us. And because of this, we did not recognize the deeper reasons for the defeat on the Volga, superiority of the socialist state and social system, whose sharp sword was the Soviet army."

== Post-war life in East Germany ==
In September 1948, Adam returned to Germany, settling in Dresden in what had become the Soviet occupation zone in Germany. He was among the co-founders of the National Democratic Party of Germany, an East German political party that acted as an organization for former members of the Nazi Party and the Wehrmacht. He became the chairman of the NDPD's state chapter in Saxony from 1949 to 1952. From 1948 to 1949, he worked as a consultant for the Saxon state government in its Ministry of Public Education. From 1950 to 1952, he was Saxony's finance minister and, from 1950 to 1963, a member of East Germany's Volkskammer.

The East German states were dissolved in July 1952 and Adam entered the paramilitary Kasernierte Volkspolizei (KVP - Barracked People's Police), the forerunner of the East German National People's Army (NVA), at Berlin in August 1952 with the rank of Oberst. In October 1953, he assumed command of the officers' college of the KVP (from March 1956, the NVA) in Dresden. In March 1958, Adam retired from the NVA, but he remained active in the Working Group of Former Officers. In 1968, he was decorated with the Banner of Labor and, on the occasion of the twenty-eighth anniversary of East Germany's founding on 7 October 1977, he was appointed Generalmajor (retired) in the East German Army.

Adam died on 24 November 1978 in Dresden.

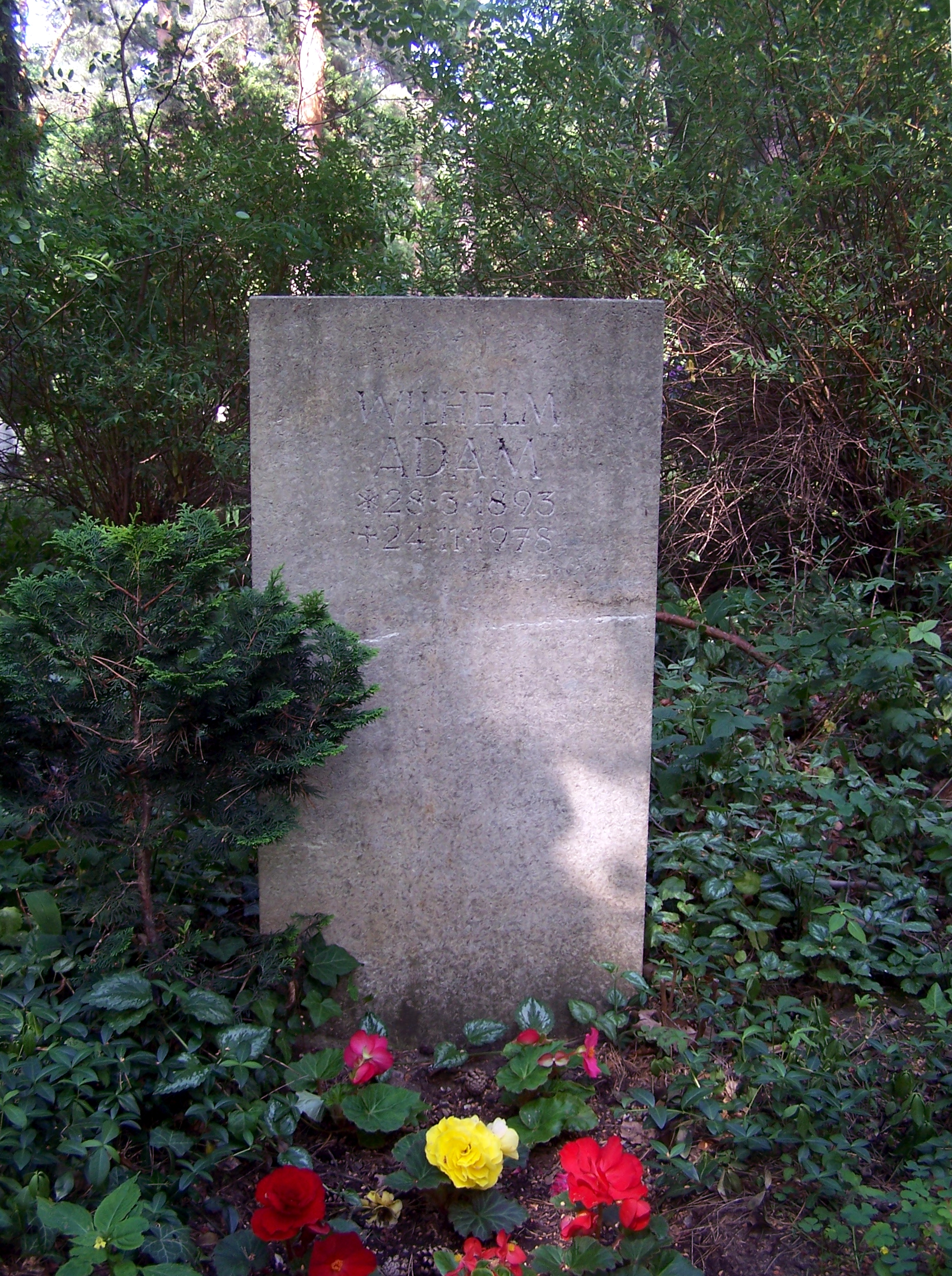
Adam's grave at the Heidefriedhof in Dresden

== Family ==
Adam and his wife had two children, a daughter and a son. His son was killed in action during the battle of France in World War II in May 1940.

== Awards ==
- Iron Cross (1914) 2nd Class (6 September 1914) & 1st Class (30 September 1917)
- Clasp to the Iron Cross (1939) 2nd Class (26 May 1940) & 1st Class (10 October 1941)
- Wehrmacht Long Service Award, 3rd class (2 October 1936)
- Knight's Cross of the Iron Cross on 17 December 1942 as Oberst and adjutant of Armeeoberkommando 6 (Supreme Command of the 6th Army)

== Works ==
- Adam, Wilhelm. Der schwere Entschluss, (autobiography), Berlin, 1965.
- Adam, W. with Otto Ruhle. With Paulus At Stalingrad, "Pen & Sword Books Ltd.", England, 2015.
