= Hermann Hoth =

German World War II general and war criminal

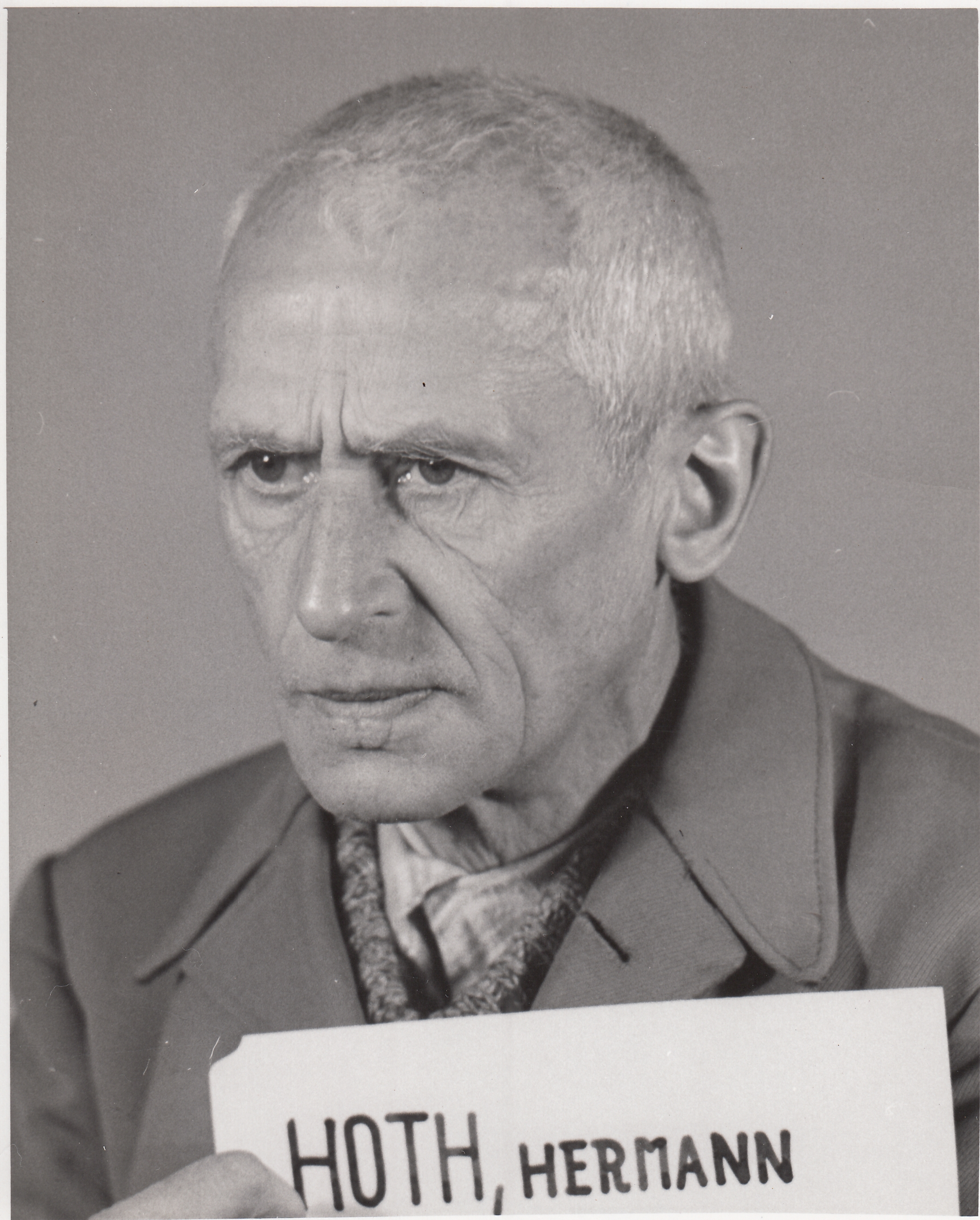
- Hermann Hoth during the High Command Trial, in 1947
- Born: 12 April 1885; Neuruppin, Province of Brandenburg, Kingdom of Prussia, German Empire
- Died: 25 January 1971 (aged 85); Goslar, West Germany
- Military career
- Allegiance: German Empire; Weimar Republic; Nazi Germany
- Service years: 1903–1945
- Rank: Generaloberst
- Nicknames: "Papa" "Giftzwerg"
- Commands: 18th Infantry Division; XV Motorised Corps; 3rd Panzer Group; 17th Army; 4th Panzer Army
- Conflicts: World War I; World War II; Invasion of Poland; Battle of France; Operation Barbarossa; Case Blue; Battle of Stalingrad; Third Battle of Kharkov; Battle of Kursk; Battle of Voronezh (1942); Battle of Kiev (1943)
- Awards: Knight's Cross of the House Order of Hohenzollern with Swords; Knight's Cross of the Iron Cross with Oak Leaves and Swords
- Criminal information
- Convictions: War crimes Crimes against humanity
- Trial: High Command Trial
- Penalty: 15 years imprisonment

Details
- Victims: Soviet prisoners of war Soviet civilians (Jews and Slavs)

Signature
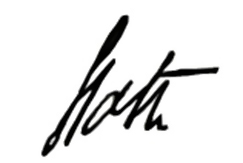

Hermann Hoth (12 April 1885 – 25 January 1971) was a German army commander, war criminal, and author. He served as a high-ranking panzer commander in the Wehrmacht during World War II, playing a prominent role in the Battle of France and on the Eastern Front. Contemporaries and later historians consider Hoth one of the most talented armoured warfare commanders of the war. He was a strong believer in Nazism, and units under his command committed several war crimes including the murder of prisoners of war and civilians.

Born in Prussia, Hoth embarked on a career as a military officer early in his youth. After graduating from the Royal Prussian Military Academy, he slowly rose in the ranks of the Imperial German Army. Hoth mainly served in various staff positions in World War I, and after the conflict's conclusion continued to do so in the armed forces of the newly formed Weimar Republic. Following Hitler's seizure of control in Germany, Hoth began to rapidly rise in the ranks and became known as a proponent of motorization in the Wehrmacht.

When World War II broke out, Hoth successfully led the XV Army Corps during the German invasions of Poland and France. He commanded the 3rd Panzer Group during Operation Barbarossa in 1941, a position in which he assisted in the destruction of several Soviet armies. From October 1941, Hoth headed the 17th Army, a period during which he advocated for a war of annihilation against the Soviet Union, the merciless destruction of partisans, and the murder of Jews. In the Wehrmacht's 1942 summer offensive, Hoth led the 4th Panzer Army and took part in the Battle of Stalingrad. When the German 6th Army was encircled at Stalingrad in November 1942, Hoth's army group made an unsuccessful relief attempt. Afterwards, Hoth was involved in the Third Battle of Kharkov as well as the Battle of Kursk, while increasingly suffering from near-burnout. He led the German defense in eastern Ukraine during the Battle of the Dnieper, but was sacked by Adolf Hitler due to the surprise Soviet reconquest of Kiev in November 1943. For the rest of the war, he was mostly relegated to powerless positions.

After the war, Hoth was convicted of war crimes and crimes against humanity in the High Command Trial, mainly regarding his implementation of the criminal Commissar Order and the mistreatment of POWs as well as civilians. He was sentenced to 15 years in prison, but released on parole in 1954. Hoth subsequently became an author, writing about armoured warfare, the development of West Germany's military, and in support of the myth of the clean Wehrmacht.

== Early life ==
=== Early career ===
Born on 14 April 1885 in Neuruppin, Hoth grew up in Demmin which like Neuruppin was located in Prussia. His parents were Hermann Hoth, a Prussian staff officer surgeon, and Margarethe Hoth (née Hübener). He attended the Gymnasium in Demmin from 1894 to 1896, followed by the Cadet Corps at Potsdam, and the Preußische Hauptkadettenanstalt (Royal Prussian Military Academy) from 1900 to 1904. During his preparation and training to become an officer, Hoth developed what he later recognised was a strong authority bias, something that he did never entirely discard even after the conclusion of his education. The educators at the Cadet Corps also instilled monarchism and the rejection of social democracy in Hoth. He was commissioned as a Leutnant in the Prussian Army in 1903, but his rise in the ranks was slow. He attended the Prussian Staff College from 1910 to 1913, where he learned Russian, and was appointed Oberleutnant in 1912 and Hauptmann in 1914. At this point, he was working at the German General Staff. His first son, Hans Joachim, was born in 1913.

Hoth spent almost all of World War I as a staff officer on higher headquarters and only four weeks on the front line. As a result of his skill in Russian, he was assigned to the 8th Army on the Eastern Front in August 1914. In this role, he witnessed the 1914 Russian invasion of East Prussia. This campaign left a deep impact on Hoth, as he saw the Russians waging war with what he regarded as "bestial cruelty". He served under Generalfeldmarschall Paul von Hindenburg during this period, including during the Battle of Tannenberg, and came to greatly admire his superior. In June 1916, he was moved to the Western Front. During the war, Hoth held positions at the German General Staff, various armies, and units, including the Luftstreitkräfte (air arm of the Imperial German Army). He was awarded both classes of the Iron Cross during the war, along with several other decorations.

When Germany surrendered in 1918 amid growing internal turmoil, Hoth felt more loyalty to Hindenburg than the newly formed democratic government in Berlin. In the German Revolution of 1918–1919, Hoth served as a Reichswehr officer and helped to put down left-wing uprisings at Halle. This period hardened his hatred for any form of Communism. Hoth also believed that the failure of the right-wing Kapp Putsch proved that the military had to prevent its misuse in politics. He also married Lola Schubering in 1918. Hoth's second son, Hermann, was born in 1923.

He remained in the Reichswehr (the armed forces of the Weimar Republic) in the interwar period, serving at the organization department of the General Staff. He was promoted to Major in 1924. Three years later, Hoth was sent to the Soviet Union as part of secret military cooperation missions. In 1929, he was promoted to Oberstleutnant.

=== Initial service under the Nazi regime ===
In the 1920s, Hoth had little interest in the Nazi Party, and even regarded its activities as disruptive for the Reichswehr. His views changed with the 1930 German federal election when the Nazi Party became the second-strongest political force. Hoth started to view Hitler's nationalist ambitions with approval, and admired the Nazis' attention to workers which he viewed as unusual for a right-wing party. He was among the officers who were most favorably disposed toward Hitler's seizure of control, regarding it as a chance to improve the military. Like several other Reichswehr officers such as Heinz Guderian and Georg-Hans Reinhardt, Hoth hoped that a Nazi-led government would allow him to push through his ideas in regards to greater motorization and armoured warfare. In the aftermath of the takeover, however, Hoth (by then promoted to Oberst) clashed with Nazi Party officials when he criticised the murder of Communists and Social Democrats in Braunschweig, resulting in his transfer to Lübeck.

According to his own account, Hoth studied the ideology of the Nazi Party in some depth over the next years; historian Johannes Hürter regarded this as quite unusual for higher-ranking German officers, most of whom believed that they could remain apolitical. Hoth generally approved of the aims and achievements of the Nazi Party, although he expressed some disquiet about the elimination of German Jews. In the end, however, he believed the fate of Jews to be less important than the elimination of Communism in Germany and the restoration of what he saw as Germany's status as an equal in world affairs. In October 1932, he was appointed head of the 17th Infantry Regiment, and transferred to command the 6th Infantry Regiment in August 1933. He was promoted to Generalmajor in 1934. Following the reorganization of the German military into the Wehrmacht in 1935, Hoth was appointed to command the 18th Infantry Division. He was regarded as one of the most modern Wehrmacht officers at the time, advocating motorization and other modernization. He was promoted to Generalleutnant in 1936, followed by General der Infanterie two years later. In 1938, he led the 18th Infantry Division during the occupation of Sudetenland.

== World War II ==
=== Invasions of Poland and France ===
Hoth was given command of the XV Motorised Corps in 1938, leading it in the invasion of Poland the following year. At the time, this corps included two "light" divisions which were mixed formations of tanks, infantry, and artillery. Convinced of Hitler's capability as leader, Hoth believed the new war served a higher purpose and would decide the fate of the German people. Under Hoth's command, the XV Motorised Corps initially encountered only light resistance and quickly advanced. By 4 September 1939, Hoth's corps had routed three Polish divisions belonging to Operational Group Kielce and broke through towards the important industrial center of Kielce. Afterwards, Hoth's XV Motorised Corps "relentlessly hound[ed] Szylling's Army Kraków to extinction". Historian Robert Forczyk described Hoth as a "hard-charging" commander during the invasion of Poland, and he received the Knight's Cross of the Iron Cross for his military achievements during this campaign. Hoth believed that the XV Motorised Corps, including its "light" divisions, had "exceeded high expectations" during the invasion of Poland. Despite this, his corps' light divisions were transformed into panzer divisions for the following Western campaign, possibly due to suffering "unnecessarily high losses".

Hoth continued to lead the XV Army Corps during the invasion of France from May 1940. The initial German advance of Generaloberst Günther von Kluge's 4th Army through the Ardennes was spearheaded by General der Panzertruppe Guderian's XIX Motorised Corps on the left and Hoth's corps on the right. Hoth's corps consisted of the 5th and 7th Panzer Divisions, the latter commanded by Generalmajor Erwin Rommel. After moving through the Ardennes, Hoth was tasked with capturing crossings of the Meuse near Dinant. His forces quickly secured two bridgeheads across the river on 12/13 May, exploiting the disorganization and overextension of the local French Army units. Initially confined to the bridgeheads due to the resistance organized by the 102nd Fortress Division, the XV Motorised Corps broke through and was pushing into the French 9th Army's left flank by 14/15 May. French counter-attacks near Maubeuge on 18 May temporarily threatened Hoth's advance, but ultimately failed to stop the XV Motorised Corps, allowing it to capture Cambrai. Amid continuing Allied counter-attacks Hoth subsequently moved toward Arras which the Germans captured on 21 May. In the Battle of Dunkirk, Hoth's corps broke through the British Expeditionary Force's defensive line at La Bassée Canal on 27 May, thus assisting in encircling the French 1st Army under René Prioux at Lille.

On 6–7 June, Hoth's divisions achieved a major breakthrough at Airaines and then Forges-les-Eaux, effectively splitting the French 10th Army into two parts. After capturing Airaines, soldiers of the XV Corps murdered French prisoners of war, mainly black colonial soldiers such as Charles N'Tchoréré. The German units, including XV Motorised Corps, exploited the breakthrough to occupy Rouen and encircle a large Allied force at Saint-Valery-en-Caux, capturing about 10,000 British soldiers. Afterwards, Hoth's corps broke through Allied defensive lines at the Seine. He then split his forces in order to capture important locations in Brittany and Normandy, before advancing south to La Rochelle. His successes in France made Hoth one of the Wehrmacht's most popular generals. He was promoted to Generaloberst in July 1940, as part of an "orgy of promotions" by Hitler.

=== Operation Barbarossa ===
==== Leading the 3rd Panzer Group ====
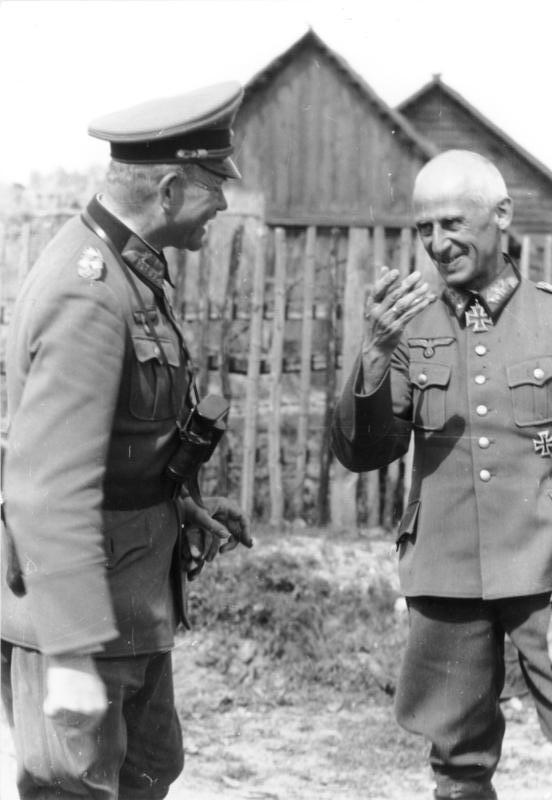
Hoth (right) with Heinz Guderian, commander of Panzer Group 2, 21 June 1941

Hoth commanded the 3rd Panzer Group during Operation Barbarossa in 1941. This unit included the XXXIX Panzer Corps, LVII Panzer Corps, V Army Corps, and VI Army Corps which consisted of four Panzer divisions (7th, 12th, 19th, and 20th), three motorized divisions (14th, 20th, 18th), and four infantry divisions (5th, 6th, 26th, 35th). The 3rd Panzer Group fielded 626 tanks at the offensive's start. In his diaries, Hoth expressed no doubts about or opposition to the invasion, mirroring the opinion of most high-ranking German commanders. From a moral and ideological standpoint, Hoth believed that Russia had been overtaken by "Jewish Bolshevism", causing the country to turn away from its European heritage, transforming it into an expansionist, Asiatic, and despotic state as well as setting it on an unavoidable collision course with Germany. Hürter argued that Hoth's beliefs showcased remarkable similarities with Hitler's. Even after the war, Hoth continued to maintain that the invasion had been just based on these arguments. Despite his belief in the necessity of the invasion, Hoth had misgivings about its strategic planning and execution. He tried to convince his superior, Generalfeldmarschall Fedor von Bock, commander of Army Group Center, that the 3rd Panzer Group had to operate with greater flexibility and prepare to strike deeper into the Soviet Union than intended by the high command (OKH). Bock rebuffed these requests. Regardless of his misgivings, Hoth generally adhered to the decided-upon plans and Bock's commands during the invasion. Researcher Robert Kirchubel described him as a "team player" and reliable in crisis situations during Operation Barbarossa.

In course of the early stages of Operation Barbarossa, Hoth's 3rd Panzer Group broke through the Soviet border defenses with relative ease. Bock consequently released Hoth from the 9th Army, allowing him to operate more freely. Guderian's 2nd Panzer Group and Hoth's 3rd Panzer Group proceeded to encircle Minsk as part of Army Group Center's operations, trapping 300,000 Red Army soldiers and capturing or destroying 2,500 tanks. At this point, Hoth again argued that the 3rd Panzer Group should move deeper into the Soviet territory and encircle more enemy troops before closing the pocket. This time he was supported by Bock, but they were overruled by the OKH. Alongside Guderian's 2nd Panzer Group, Hoth then pushed further to attack Smolensk, believing that they had to continue their advance to not allow the Red Army to reorganize. Before reaching the city, the panzer groups of Guderian and Hoth had almost outrun their supply lines, but were able to keep moving thanks to captured Soviet fuel depots. Hoth split his force into two, and secured vital crossings of the Daugava river on 3–4 July. His panzer group then kept advancing between the Daugava and Dnieper, capturing Vitebsk. The breakthrough of Hoth's 3rd Panzer Group at the Daugava-Dnieper line allowed for the encirclement of three Soviet armies.

As the Wehrmacht advanced, questions arose about the treatment of suspected Red Army soldiers or deserters in civilian clothing. Hoth ordered the 3rd Panzer Group's officers to subject such individuals to a limited examination; if the officers concluded that the prisoners were Red Army soldiers, they were to be shot. Like all German armies on the Eastern Front, Hoth's Panzer Group also implemented the Commissar Order. Following the war, Hoth was the only German general who admitted that he had agreed with the order, believing that the Soviet political commissars could not be regarded as regular soldiers. According to reports from subordinate units, the order was carried out on a widespread basis.

In mid-July 1941, the 3rd Panzer Group was subordinated to Army Group North to shore up the flanks and attempted to seize Velikie Luki. This was part of a larger operation aimed at seizing Leningrad. Hoth's forces were driven back on 20 July when Red Army forces broke through the German lines, prompting criticism from Bock for unnecessarily striking out too far to the north east. In early August, Hitler ordered a southward diversion of the German advance at Bryansk to the objection of many leading German officers, including Hoth, who advocated for a continued direct drive to Moscow. In mid to late August, Hoth's forces faced another setback owing to heavy losses and dispersal of efforts: facing the heavily reinforced Soviet 19th Army, he committed the 7th Panzer Division without infantry support, which resulted in what the historian David Stahel describes as a "debacle". The division's attack ran into fortified Soviet lines and was repulsed with the loss of 30 tanks. By September, the constant fighting had heavily depleted Hoth's force, as the 3rd Panzer Group had only about 250 tanks remaining. Hoth's panzer group subsequently assisted in Operation Typhoon, the offensive to capture Moscow. Stationed on the left flank, his force and the 9th Army were supposed to attack from Dukhovshchina toward Vyazma. As the plans for Operation Typhoon were discussed by the OKH and frontline commanders, Hoth argued for a delay of one day regarding the offensive, but was overruled.

At the start of Operation Typhoon, the 3rd Panzer Group made good progress, though was slowed down by Soviet air attacks and the worn-down state of some of its units. Hoth's force and the 9th Army successfully captured two bridges across the Dnieper east of Kholm-Zhirkovsky and were just 60 kilometres (37 mi) from Vyazma, close to achieving another encirclement, when they were stopped by counter-attacks ordered by General Ivan Konev on 3 October. The resulting fighting and the exhaustion of its fuel supplies pinned down the 3rd Panzer Group until 6 October, when Hoth was able to restart the advance and sealed the Vyazma-Bryansk pockets. He was then redirected north to capture Rzhev and Kalinin, even though this effectively removed the 3rd Panzer Group from the Battle of Moscow. Hitler and the OKH believed that the "fatal blow" to the Red Army had been already delivered at Vyazma-Bryansk, and hoped for more great encirclements.

==== Appointment as 17th Army commander ====
On 9 October, Hoth was appointed commander of the 17th Army in Ukraine. This army's previous commander, Carl-Heinrich von Stülpnagel, had been criticized for his "timid leadership", and the OKH deemed Hoth to be the right individual to get the 17th Army to advance more aggressively. This decision was motivated by the assessment of Army Group North commander Wilhelm Ritter von Leeb who had lauded Hoth as "intelligent, deliberate, good mind for operational questions, leads very well", and "suitable as an army commander". Even though the appointment as 17th Army head was a promotion, Hoth unsuccessfully asked to remain with the 3rd Panzer Group; Fedor von Bock also expressed his opposition, not wanting to lose an "outstanding armoured commander". Upon moving to the 17th Army, Hoth ordered an advance against Lozova, taking it after two days of fighting. He then split the army to attack both Izium as well as Stalino. However, the German operations in the region slowed down due to bad weather and the widespread destruction of infrastructure, causing Hitler to order a focus on Kharkov. The 17th Army was supposed to help in this operation as well, forcing it to attack in three directions. Spread across a wide area, Hoth's force also encountered heavy resistance as the Red Army mobilized about 150,000 workers to assist the defense of the Donbas. Though the 17th Army ultimately captured most of the middle Don, its advance was slow and costly. Eventually, Hoth argued for a pause of offensive operations due to logistical issues and the exhaustion of his troops.

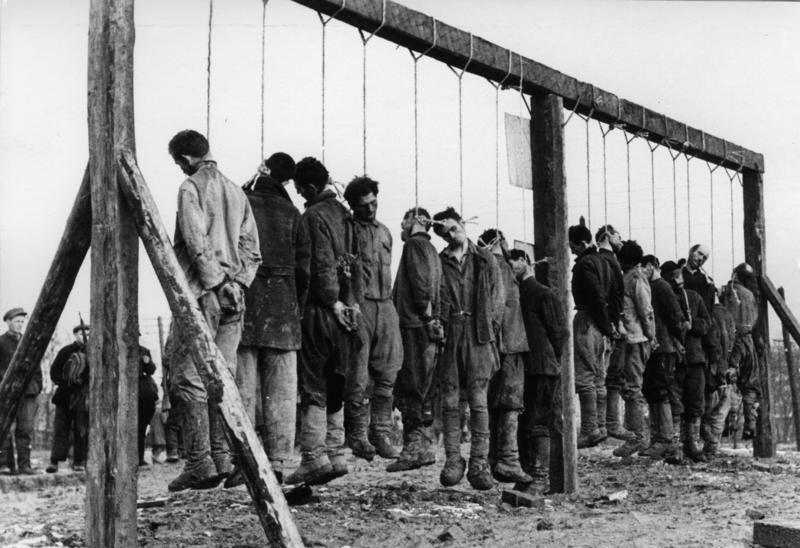
Execution of Soviet partisans by German forces

Hoth was an active supporter of the war of annihilation (Vernichtungskrieg) against the Soviet Union, calling on his men to understand the need for "harsh punishment of Jewry". Under Hoth's command, units of the 17th Army took part in the hunt for and murder of Jews in its territory of control. He had a good working relationship with the Einsatzgruppen death squads, and provided them with even more support than Stülpnagel as they carried out mass murders in the 17th Army's rear areas. In response to the issuance of the Severity Order by Walter von Reichenau, Hoth issued an order of the day in November 1941. The document began with a relatively lengthy discussion of history, decrying Jewish influence on Europe, before extolling recent German victories as part of a mission to "save European culture from Asiatic barbarism" and promising the impending collapse and complete "annihilation" of the Soviet Union, an "enslaved and joyless country". Finally, he gave the following directive to troops under his command:

Every sign of active or passive resistance or any sort of machinations on the part of Jewish-Bolshevik agitators are to be immediately and pitilessly exterminated ... These circles are the intellectual supports of Bolshevism, the bearers of its murderous organisation, the helpmates of the partisans. It is the same Jewish class of beings who have done so much damage to our own Fatherland by virtue of their activities against the nation and civilisation, and who promote anti-German tendencies throughout the world, and who will be the harbingers of revenge. Their extermination is a dictate of our own survival.

Hürter argued that this order reflected that Hoth was fully aware of the ongoing Holocaust, and evidently urged his troops to kill Jews not just due to their alleged support for anti-German elements, but also to prevent them from taking revenge in the future. According to researcher Linden Lyons, the order reflected Hoth's "obsequiousness" to Hitler, a tendency to blame the German "national trauma" of World War I on Jewish Bolshevism, and an attempt to "outdo" the extremity of Reichenau's order. Researcher and Manstein biographer Marcel Stein argued that the order as a whole "can cast doubt upon Hoth's sanity" and was "full of repetitive venom and hatred".

Based on his order's reasoning and claiming that the Red Army was also operating with extreme brutality, Hoth additionally ordered the 17th Army's soldiers to kill all suspected partisans. He advised subordinate officers to cultivate the growing hatred for Soviet troops among the common German soldiers. Hoth also ordered the shooting of any civilians encountered in the woods, as these could potentially support or be partisans. He also agreed with and ordered the mass requisitioning of food, despite causing starvation in occupied cities. In his diaries, Hoth expressed his belief that leniency was the main reason for resistance in the rear areas; accordingly the German security forces should exterminate any opposition without mercy. In December 1941, the Einsatzgruppen, namely Sonderkommando 4b and Einsatzkommando 6, initiated a series of massacres in the 17th Army's rear areas in the Donbas, killing thousands of civilians. At the same time, Hoth moderated some of the most extreme orders from the OKH; for instance, he ordered his troops to not treat Ukraine as a colony, and to show local civilians some respect. Hoth believed that the Ukrainians would become part of the new order in Europe.

=== Operations in 1942 ===
==== Soviet winter offensive and Case Blue ====
In early January 1942, Hoth became the acting commander of the entire Army Group South, just before the start of the Soviet winter offensives. In the Barvenkovo–Lozovaya offensive, the Red Army successfully drove the 17th Army back and created a bulge in the German frontline around Izium. Hoth's requests to orderly retreat during this campaign were denied by Bock who had assumed control of Army Group South. As the Soviet military had greatly enlarged the Izium bridgehead by 25 January, Hoth told Bock that the 17th Army should focus on defending Dnipropetrovsk and that only two options remained to the German defenders: a "desperate" counter-attack to stop the Red Army from reaching Dnipropetrovsk or the "quick" shifting of troops from other areas to shore up the defenses along the bulge. Bock interpreted these proposals as Hoth threatening to move his entire army westward, and ordered him to remain where he was until reserves arrived. Concluding that Hoth and his staff were "overtired", Bock also decided to temporarily transfer the 17th Army's leadership to Paul Ludwig Ewald von Kleist. "Less a prima donna than many German army commanders," Hoth did not oppose this change. Despite having been temporarily replaced, he avoided being sacked, and helped to stabilize the southern frontline after the Germans lost Rostov-on-Don. In the Second Battle of Kharkov during May 1942, Hoth initially led the 17th Army, but took over from General Richard Ruoff as commander of 4th Panzer Army on 15 May 1942.

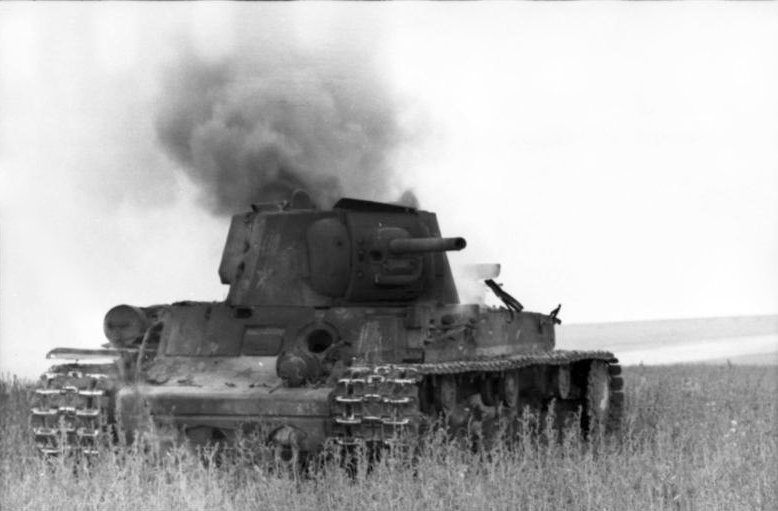
Destroyed Red Army KV-1 tank during the Battle of Voronezh.

As part of Case Blue, the German summer offensive in the southern Soviet Union, Hoth demonstrated "great operational command skill". Under his leadership, the 4th Panzer Army initially broke through the Soviet defensive lines of the Bryansk Front at the start of Case Blue on 28 June 1942, making quick progress despite Soviet counter-attacks. The army reached the Don River and assaulted Voronezh by 5 July; Hoth's force quickly secured most of the city. Significant pockets of resistance remained in the city, but Hitler ordered Hoth to keep advancing. The Soviet military responded by launching a counter-offensive led by Alexander Lizyukov to retake Voronezh. The OKH initially did not recognize that the 4th Panzer Army faced an entire Soviet tank army and several tank corps, and dismissed the counter-offensive as "insignificant". The 4th Panzer Army was thus not properly reinforced, but Hoth was still able to organize an effective defense. By 15 July, the Soviet counter-offensive had been repulsed, and the 4th Panzer Army was advancing again.

Hoth and his force were subsequently redirected by Hitler to support Army Group A in the Donbas, disregarding the original plans of Case Blue in which the 4th Panzer Army would have continued to support the direct advance toward Stalingrad. Though the 4th Panzer Army and other German forces participating in this "gambit" were short on fuel at this time, the redirected attack initially met considerable success. Hoth's force and the 1st Panzer Army encircled five Soviet armies west of Millerovo, but the pocket could not be contained and much of the Soviet force was able to retreat. Regardless of the result, this diversion of forces to assist Army Group A had greatly slowed down the direct German advance toward Stalingrad. Frustrated at this development, Hitler transferred the majority of Hoth's force to help the 6th Army's attempt to capture Stalingrad, leaving 4th Panzer Army with just two corps and some support forces. On 31 July, most of the remaining 4th Panzer Army was also reassigned to the 6th Army, though Hoth was ordered to leave one panzer corps behind in the south. This reorganization was received poorly by the 4th Panzer Army, as its members had expected to be used in the pursuit of Soviet forces over open terrain into the Caucasus instead of having to take part in urban warfare. On his part, Hoth reacted to the change of plans by working out an operation of the 4th Panzer Army to encircle Stalingrad.

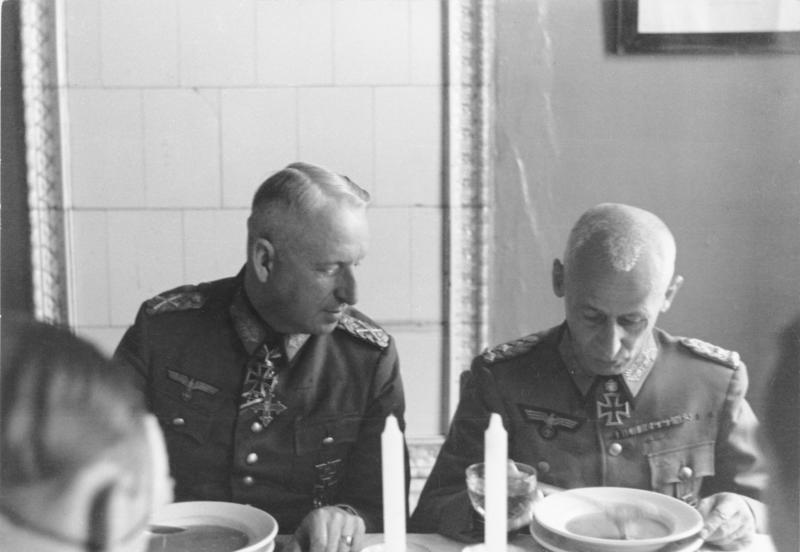
Hoth (right) with Erich von Manstein during Case Blue, June 1942

Hoth's tanks attempted to flank Stalingrad from the south-west through the Kalmyk Steppe, forcing the Soviet Stalingrad Front commander Andrey Yeryomenko to concentrate most of his forces to slow down the 4th Panzer Army. With his force being reduced to two corps and facing growing Soviet resistance, the advance of Hoth's troops slowed down. The encirclement attempt had failed by 11 August, as Hoth had too few forces to overcome the increasingly effective Soviet defenses. Thus, the panzer army was redirected to take part in the direct attack on Stalingrad. From 17 August to 2 September, it advanced northward, helping to take off pressure from the 6th Army and breaking through several Soviet armies despite being weakened in manpower and tank numbers. By the time it fully linked up with the 6th Army and had reached Stalingrad's outskirts, the 4th Panzer Army was a "panzer army in name" with just one weakened tank corps.

By mid-September, the 4th Panzer Army attacked Stalingrad's concrete grain elevator; despite greatly outnumbering the defenders, the Germans only captured the location after an extended battle on 21 September. At this point, the Red Army was massing forces for large-scale counter-offensives. Most German generals believed the Soviet military to be close to exhaustion and only capable of one offensive, expected to target Army Group Centre. Hoth was one of the few German commanders who realized that a possible Soviet attack from south of Stalingrad could pose a grave threat to the 6th Army. His warnings regarding the 6th Army's southern flank were largely ignored. In October, Hitler ordered Hoth to transfer his last full tank division to the 6th Army.

==== Operations Uranus, Winter Storm, and Little Saturn ====
By 12 November, Hoth had noticed that the Red Army was massing forces opposite 4th Panzer Army and concluded that the Soviet military was evidently not just improving its defenses. On 19 November 1942, the Soviet Operation Uranus began with a major attack on Romanian Third Army in the north. The Third Army was soon overrun, and the Germans responded by shifting forces from the south to reinforce their collapsing left flank. This left their southern flank even more exposed. The Red Army subsequently attacked south of Stalingrad, breaking through Axis lines as Hoth attempted to muster a defense. Even his own headquarters came under threat, and 4th Panzer Army was forced to withdraw. As the Soviet troops advanced and threatened to encircle the 6th Army, Hitler ordered it to "stand firm" with Hoth being assigned to assist Paulus in keeping the railway lines open. By late November, however, the 6th Army was trapped in Stalingrad, as was half of Hoth's 4th Panzer Army.

Outside the pocket, the remainder of the 4th Panzer Army and the Romanian VI and VII Corps were designated "Army Group Hoth" and attempted to slow the Red Army's advance north of Kotelnikovo. Hoth subsequently worked out a plan for the 4th Panzer Army to relieve the 6th Army, called Operation Winter Storm, and outlined it on 3 December. However, he did not receive the 17th Panzer Division to complete his strike force on time; his understrength force began its relief attempt under the overall command of Generalfeldmarschall Erich von Manstein's Army Group Don on 12 December. Hoth's army was stalled at Verkhnekumsky until 15 December, allowing the Soviet 2nd Guards Army to reinforce its positions at the Myshkova River and prepare for Operation Little Saturn. On 16 December, three Soviet armies began Operation Little Saturn, threatening Army Group Don's flank and stopping the 4th Panzer Army. By 25 December, Operation Winter Storm had failed, and Manstein ordered Hoth to abandon his breakthrough attempts. He was instead directed to help shore up the German defenses as the Soviet Operation Little Saturn threatened Army Group Don's rear. However, the 4th Panzer Army was no longer in the position to cover a large section of the frontline. Overall, Hoth's forces suffered heavy losses during these operations and were forced to retreat 600 kilometres (370 mi) into the eastern Ukraine.

=== Third Battle of Kharkov ===
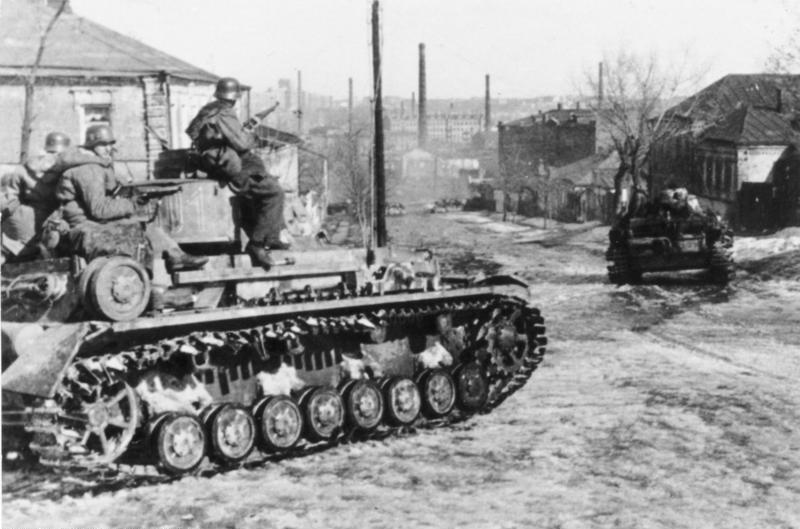
Troops of 2nd SS Panzer Division Das Reich, then part of Hoth's army, during the Third Battle of Kharkov

On 18 February, Hoth passed the command of his troops, by then part of the Mius-Front, to Karl-Adolf Hollidt. He then met with Manstein at Dnipropetrovsk where he was informed that the 4th Panzer Army was being refounded, consisting of two tank corps, two tank divisions, two infantry divisions, and Waffen-SS units, including the II SS Panzer Corps, Das Reich and Totenkopf. Under his command, this force was ordered to halt the Soviet 1st Guards and 6th Army east of Dnipropetrovsk and push them back across the river Samara. This operation was part of the Third Battle of Kharkov, a counteroffensive against the Soviet forces advancing in the Donbass region.

The newly refounded 4th Panzer Army launched its attack on 21 February. The German forces cut off the Soviet mobile spearheads and continued the drive north, with Hoth's force starting its attack on Kharkov on 28 February. By early March, however, an early thaw threatened the German advance; Hoth and Manstein decided that the 4th Panzer Army should press on regardless. Kharkov was retaken by the Germans on 15 March and Belgorod on 18 March. Exhaustion of both the Wehrmacht and the Red Army coupled with the loss of mobility due to the onset of the spring rasputitsa resulted in the cessation of operations for both sides by mid-March. The counteroffensive left a salient extending into the German area of control, centered around the city of Kursk, and leading up to Operation Citadel.

=== Battles of Kursk, the Dnieper, and last commands ===
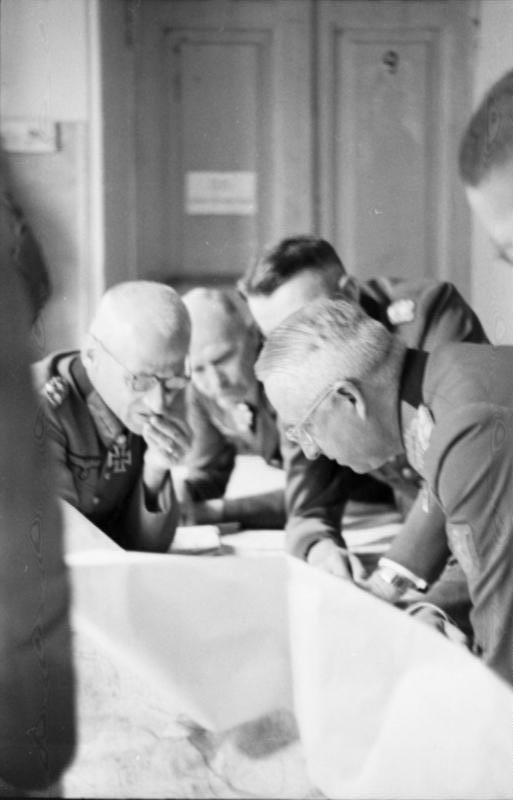
Hoth (first from left) and other German officers discuss the plans for Operation Citadel.

In July 1943, Hoth commanded the 4th Panzer Army in the Battle of Kursk as part of Army Group South. Operation Citadel called for a double envelopment, directed at Kursk, to surround the Soviet defenders and seal off the salient. The Army Group South committed Hoth's 4th Panzer Army, alongside Army Detachment Kempf. At this point, Hoth was considered one of the Wehrmacht's most experienced senior-level tank commanders, but his leadership was less effective compared to earlier periods of the war. Forczyk argued that Hoth showed signs of "approaching burnout". As the offensive at Kursk was repeatedly delayed, Hoth became increasingly pessimistic about Operation Citadel's chances of success due to the increasing Soviet defenses. Despite this, both Hoth as well as Werner Kempf, commander of the eponymous army detachment, decided not to prepare for obstacle breaching at Kursk, assuming that the German engineers would remove Soviet minefields without much difficulty. They also did not realize the depth and strength of Nikolai Vatutin's defense lines. As a result of German mistakes in planning, coordination between Hoth and Kempf would be poor during the offensive, with each fighting a separate battle.

When Operation Citadel started, Hoth's divisions, reinforced by the II SS Panzer Corps under Paul Hausser, penetrated several Soviet defensive lines, before being brought to a halt in the Battle of Prokhorovka. This was partially the result of Hoth hesitating to keep advancing as his flanks were threatened by Soviet counter-attacks, while Kempf's force had been unable to keep up. On the other side, Forczyk argued that Hoth "rightly" chose to ignore orders by Manstein to reinforce failing attacks by Hermann Breith. Overall, the Battle of Kursk was a major Soviet victory.

In the aftermath of Kursk, the Red Army mounted a series of successful offensives that crossed the Dnieper. Hoth was unable to destroy the Soviet bridgeheads across the river. In September 1943, Hoth's army was operationally penetrated by Red Army units and was unable to maintain a continuous front line even in retreat. The army crossed the Dnieper south and north of Kiev with heavy losses. Despite this, he received the Knight's Cross of the Iron Cross with Oak Leaves and Swords for this strategic withdrawal and his defense at the Dnieper. In November, the Red Army broke through Hoth's defenses in a surprise offensive which retook Kiev and ultimately pushed the Germans out of eastern Ukraine. The rapid loss of Kiev "humiliated" Hoth who was blamed by Hitler for this defeat. Historian Earl F. Ziemke also contended that by this point Hitler "wanted generals who would hold without giving an inch", whereas Hoth was an expert in mobile defense. In November 1943, Hoth was put on leave, officially "to unwind", and relieved of command on 10 December 1943. Forczyk argued that the German failures in the battle of the Dnieper had resulted from both Hitler's interferences in tactical matters as well as the inability of the Wehrmacht commanders, including Hoth, to anticipate Soviet actions. According to him, they had not recognized the rapid improvement of the Red Army.

After being removed from his position, Hoth was denounced by Hitler as "a bird of ill-omen" and "an instigator of defeatism of the worst sort". Hoth spent the following time in the Führerreserve. Though he was named commander of the Ore Mountains in April 1944, this position was "completely meaningless". Hoth was only properly recalled in April 1945. He was appointed commander of the Saale, and ordered to defend the Halle-Leipzig area until the 12th Army was combat-ready again. He organized a defensive line at Mulde and Elbe and offered some resistance to the advancing United States Armed Forces before his forces broke. Afterwards, he served as commander of the Ore Mountains again before surrendering to U.S. American troops on 7 May 1945.

== Trial ==
Following the end of the war, Hoth was tried at the Subsequent Nuremberg Trials, in the High Command Trial.

=== Indictment ===
Hoth was charged on four counts:

1. Crimes against peace by waging aggressive war against other nations and violating international treaties.
2. War crimes by being responsible for murder, ill-treatment and other crimes against prisoners of war and enemy belligerents.
3. Crimes against humanity by participating or ordering the murder, torture, deportation, hostage-taking, etc. of civilians in military-occupied countries.
4. Participating and organizing the formulations and execution of a common plan and conspiracy to commit aforementioned crimes.

=== Hoth's evidence ===
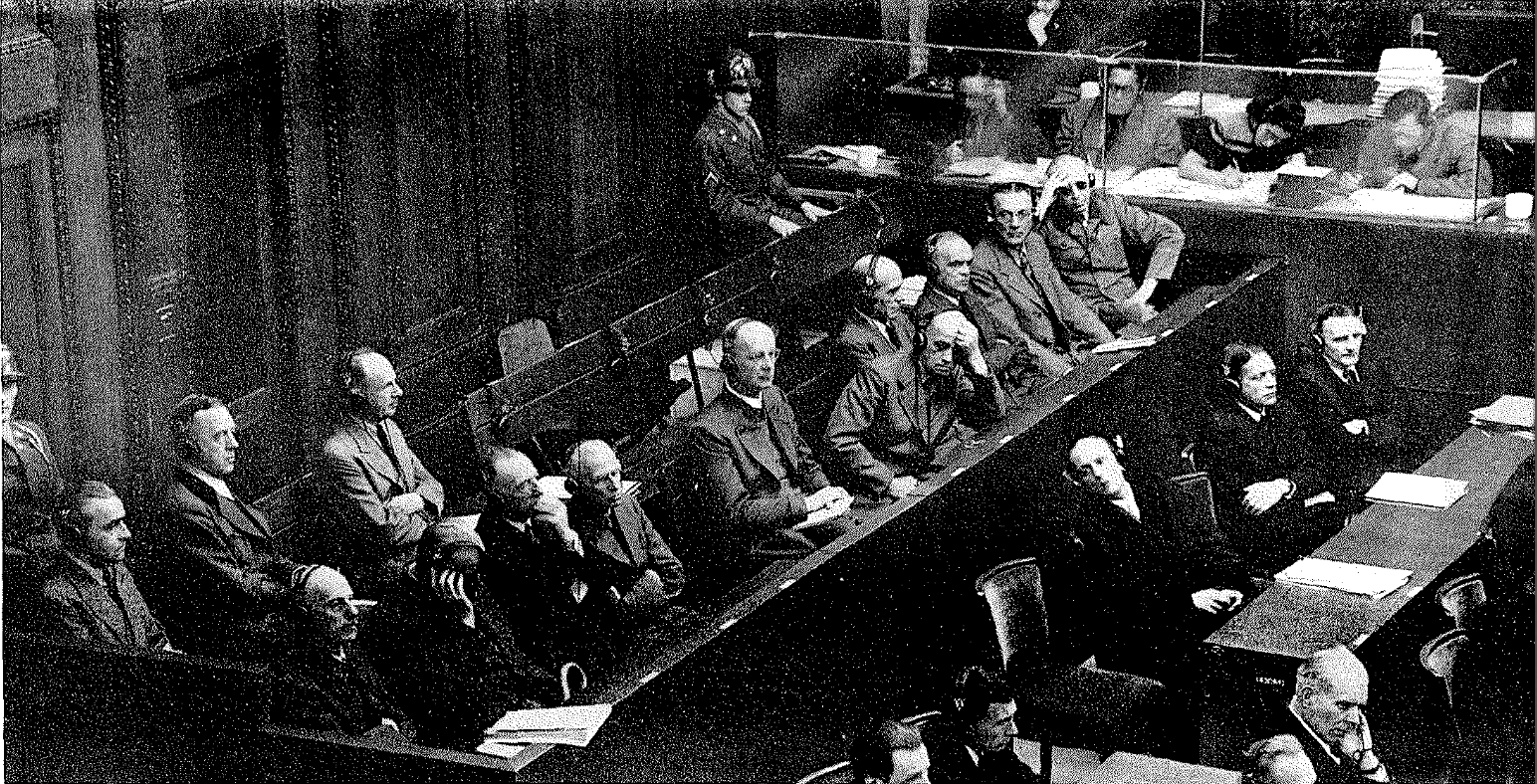
Hoth (front row, fourth from left) among the High Command Trial defendants

During his testimony he sought to explain his November 1941 order as being only aimed at the elimination of the "Bolshevik-Jewish resistance". He denied any knowledge of the Holocaust, and claimed that his instructions only meant that his troops should be vigilant and were intended to improve morale: "The German soldier in his good nature ... easily forgot that he was still in enemy territory" and that the "power of Bolshevism [had to be] broken". He insisted that no physical harm came to civilians as the result of this measure, which his troops executed with "clean hands". Hoth maintained that if any Jews had been killed it was due to their connection to crimes against the German forces. "It was a matter of common knowledge in Russia that it was the Jew in particular who participated in a very large extent in sabotage, espionage, etc.," Hoth claimed. However, he also maintained that the Russians were instinctually adjusted to a severe form of leadership, regarding leniency as weakness. Hoth believed this argument to sufficiently justify the brutality of the German occupation.

In regard to the criminal Commissar Order, Hoth claimed that he had been "compelled" to transmit it to the troops under his command, as otherwise he would have been replaced by a more compliant officer. He also denied having demanded that the Commissar Order be carried out, maintaining that he had opposed it. He expressed the view that his subordinates would have known of his disapproval of the order even though he had never actually voiced any opposition to it. Despite this, he made contradictory remarks as well. For once, he argued that Hitler would not have ordered his commanders to do anything criminal, claiming that the Führer had only wanted to "protect" soldiers from the commissars who had been "bloodthirty beast[s]". Hoth also maintained that any orders by Hitler superseded Section 48 of the German Military Penal Code which affirmed that soldiers were under no obligation to adhere to clearly criminal orders. In response to evidence of his troops killing hostages, Hoth denied this as well. He instead posited that only partisans were executed, while blaming the brutality of partisan warfare on Soviet leader Joseph Stalin. Furthermore, he stated that Soviet prisoners of war had always been treated well, arguing that the usage of the nickname "Ivan" for the POWs showcased the "family-like relationship that our soldiers had to the Russian prisoners of war". In an attempt to sway the tribunal, Hoth's attorney submitted 92 affidavits testifying to his good character.

The International Military Tribunal found Hoth's arguments unconvincing. According to Stein, "apart from Wöhler, no other general was subject to more mockery" during the High Command Trial. Relating to Hoth's alleged lack of knowledge of the massacre of Jews, the tribunal pointed out the Artemovsk massacre. On 14 December 1941, the Sicherheitsdienst (SD) had murdered 1,224 Jews and 93 other prisoners at Artemovsk in an area of Hoth's command; he admitted that he had been informed of the mass killing. The tribunal concluded that he was thus fully aware of the SD's murder of Jews, but the 17th Army under Hoth still continued to hand over prisoners to the SD and continued to cooperate with the agency.

Furthermore, there was clear evidence that Hoth had transmitted the Commissar Order with his full knowledge and approval, and several reports confirmed that he had been aware of the execution of hundreds of captured commissars. There was also a large amount of evidence showcasing Hoth's knowledge and approval of the mass execution of not just partisans, but also "partisan suspects or sympathizers". Relating to the mistreatment of POWs under Hoth's command, the tribunal referenced a report by the 17th Army's Oberquartiermeister (chief quartermaster) to Hoth on 25 November 1941, outlining cases of murder, deliberate starvation, usage as human shields, and a general neglect of the POWs' welfare. The tribunal admitted that "not all of these conditions" could be attributed to Hoth, but that the commander had made no efforts to counteract and in some cases approved the mistreatment. Hoth had also ordered POWs to be used for forced labour and as ammunition loaders.

=== Judgement and sentence ===
Hoth was acquitted under counts one and four. He was convicted under count two relating to the Commissar Order and the unlawful treatment of POWs. He was also convicted under count three for war crimes and crimes against humanity consisting of crimes against civilians in regard to the murder of civilians suspected to be associated with partisans and Jews. The International Military Tribunal gave the following verdict against Hoth:

His testimony tends to show that his subordinates should have cathoderay-tubes in their brains, enabling them to grasp the ideas that resulted from his honourable character. He thought that they should have the courage to disobey an order, while he himself lacked such courage. Either the rays which resulted from his character were too weak or the brains of his subordinated were not sophisticated enough to comprehend them.

On 27 October 1948, he was sentenced to 15 years in prison. Hoth served his time in the prison of Landsberg am Lech. He complied with his prison duties, though continued to maintain his innocence. In January 1951, Hoth's sentence was reviewed with no changes. He was released on parole in April 1954; his sentence was reduced to time served in 1957.

== Later life and legacy ==
After his release, he settled down in Goslar where he spent the rest of his life. He took up walking the Harz mountains as a hobby, and began writing on topics related to World War II. In 1956, Hoth wrote a book titled Panzer-Operationen. The book was translated into Russian under the title Tankovye operacii in 1961, and as Panzer Operations: Germany's Panzer Group 3 During the Invasion of Russia, 1941 into English in 2015. Chris Buckham, reviewer of the English translation, described it as "very readable and thought-provoking". (Note: Buckham specifically lauded it for outlining Hoth's views on the command of armoured forces in the field, which Buckham found convincing, and for describing the interactions between Hitler, the strategic command, and operational units in a way which is "both relevant and insightful even today". Buckham's main criticism of Panzer Operations was a section added by translator Linden Lyons which detailed Hoth's social and political views; Buckham found this part "somewhat jarring".) Hoth also penned several articles for the journal Wehrkunde. In one of these articles, Hoth made an "almost hysterical" appeal for the Bundeswehr, West Germany's new armed forces, to mobilize strong tank divisions. He maintained contacts with Wehrmacht officers who had been recruited into the Bundeswehr such as Friedrich Foertsch.

In the 1960s, he began to speak out against German historians who began to study the war and highlight the crimes committed by Nazi Germany. Hoth claimed that German veterans were the ones who should have the "greater right" to shape the perception on the war. In his view, accounts of the conflict should not focus on defeats and instead maintain a "heroic image" of the Wehrmacht in order to protect the ability of the Bundeswehr to motivate potential officers to enlist. He spent his last years trying to "preserve" the German military's public perception, giving interviews to journalists and historians. In addition, Hoth, Fritz Bayerlein, and several ex-SS officers worked closely with Paul Carell, assisting him to write a book titled Unternehmen Barbarossa (published 1963). Carell had worked as a German propagandist during World War II, and Unternehmen Barbarossa supported the myth of the clean Wehrmacht as well as the portrayal of Waffen-SS members as regular soldiers, ignoring the Holocaust and other German war crimes. In the writing process for Unternehmen Barbarossa, Hoth influenced Carell to portray Manstein's performance in the campaigns of Stalingrad in a positive light. Reviewer Raymond L. Garthoff argued that the English translation of Unternehmen Barbarossa, called Hitler Moves East: 1941-1943, was a "first-class military historical narrative", though exhibited a pro-Wehrmacht bias and tended to "skip over more reprehensible German accomplishments". Michael Parrish was more critical, characterizing the book as an attempt "to glorify the German Army, and heap blame on that most convenient of all scapegoats, Adolf Hitler", while also suffering from factual errors and deliberate omissions. Historians Ronald Smelser and Edward J. Davies concurred, stating that Hitler Moves East: 1941-1943 is often misleading, portraying the "Wehrmacht as heroes" fighting "the Asiatic hordes of Communism", while solely blaming Hitler for atrocities and the ultimate German defeat.

From 1965, Hoth developed close contacts with Ulrich de Maizière, Inspector General of the Bundeswehr. The two men had already known each other since World War II, as they had first met while serving in the Wehrmacht. Their first post-war meeting was organized by their common acquaintance, Friedrich Foertsch, and de Maizière discovered that they shared the belief that tank units should form the core of the West German military. The two began to regularly discuss topics, and the Inspector General publicly voiced his high opinion of Hoth.

Hoth died in Goslar on 25 January 1971. He was survived by his wife Lola.

Historians David M. Glantz and Jonathan M. House described Hoth as "one of Germany's most experienced armored tacticians". Ziemke argued that Hoth displayed "mastery of the mobile defense" in his campaigns. According to Buckham, Hoth "is considered by many to have been one of the greatest armoured commanders serving in the German Army during the Second World War". Researcher Linden Lyons, translator of Panzer Operations, argued that Hoth "was undoubtedly one of the most brilliant tank commanders of the Second World War, yet this is overshadowed by his strong enthusiasm for the expansionist and racist ideology of Nazism". Stein described Hoth as "an outstanding Panzer commander. But in the larger historic context of the war, he was a nobody". In course of the war, Hoth had written down extensive notes, comparable in length to The Halder Diaries. Even though these notes were long ignored in historiography, Hürter argued that Hoth's writings were of high value as they complement the information contained in Halder's diaries. For instance, Hoth documented Hitler's speech to his high-ranking officers before Operation Barbarossa in much more detail than any other source, outlining German strategic and ideological aims.

== Summary of military career ==
=== Awards ===
- Iron Cross
  - 2nd Class (20 September 1914)
  - 1st Class (2 August 1915)
- Knight's Cross of the House Order of Hohenzollern with Swords (16 August 1918)
- Hanseatic Cross of Hamburg
- Military Merit Cross of Austria-Hungary, 3rd class with war decoration
- Gallipoli Star
- Knight of the Order of Military Merit of Bulgaria
- Knight's Cross of the Iron Cross with Oak Leaves and Swords
  - Knight's Cross on 27 October 1939 as General der Infanterie and commander of XV Army Corps
  - 25th Oak Leaves on 17 July 1941 as Generaloberst and commander-in-chief of Panzer Group 3
  - 35th Swords on 15 September 1943 as Generaloberst and commander-in-chief of 4th Panzer Army

=== Promotions ===
27 January 1905:	Leutnant (equivalent to second lieutenant)
19 June 1912:	Oberleutnant (equivalent to first lieutenant)
8 November 1914:	Hauptmann (equivalent to captain)
11 January 1924:	Major
1 February 1929:	Oberstleutnant (equivalent to lieutenant colonel)
1 February 1932:	Oberst (equivalent to colonel)
1 October 1934:	Generalmajor (equivalent to brigadier general)
2 October 1936:	Generalleutnant (equivalent to major general)
10 November 1938:	General der Infanterie (equivalent to lieutenant general)
19 July 1940:	Generaloberst (equivalent to general)

== Publications ==
- "Flugzeuge als Kampfmittel" [Aircraft as Weapons]. Militär-wissenschaftliche Mitteilungen (in German). 2 (7). 1922. ISSN 0935-3623. OCLC 602538332.
- Panzer-Operationen: Die Panzergruppe 3 u.d. operativ Gedanke d. dt. Führung. Sommer 1941 (in German). Heidelberg: Vowinckel. 1956. OCLC 73459162.
  - Tankovye operacii (in Russian). Translated by M. N. Mel'nikova. Moscow: Voennoe Izd. Ministerstva oborony Sojuza SSR. 1961.
  - Panzer Operations: Germany's Panzer Group 3 During the Invasion of Russia, 1941. Translated by Linden Lyons. Havertown: Casemate Books. 2015. ISBN 978-1-61200-269-9.
  - 装甲作战 : 赫尔曼·霍特大将战争回忆录 (in Chinese). Translated by Yuan Zhu. Beijing: Zhong guo chang an chu ban she. 2016. OCLC 1099444502.
  - パンツァー・オペラツィオーネン : 第三装甲集団司令官「バルバロッサ」作戦回顧錄 / (in Japanese). Translated by Ōki Takeshi. Tokyo: Sakuhinsha. 2017. OCLC 1099444502.
- "Buchbesprechung zu Jacobsen, 'Fall Gelb'" [Book Review of Jacobsen's "Fall Gelb"]. Wehrkunde [Military Studies]. 7 (2): 118–119. 1958. ISSN 0043-213X.
- "Mansteins Operationsplan für den Westfeldzug 1940 und die Aufmarschanweisung des O.K.H. vom 27. Februar 1940". Wehrkunde. 7 (3): 127–130. 1958. ISSN 0043-213X.
- "Das Schicksal der französischen Panzerwaffe im 1. Teil des Westfeldzugs 1940". Wehrkunde. 7 (7): 367–377. 1958. ISSN 0043-213X.
- "Zu "Mansteins Operationsplan für den Westfeldzug 1940 und die Aufmarschanweisung des O.K.H. vom 27. Februar 1940"". Wehrkunde. 7 (8): 459. 1958.
- "Der Kampf von Panzerdivisionen in Kampfgruppen in Beispielen der Kriegsgeschichte". Wehrkunde. 8 (7): 567–584. 1959.
- "Die Verwendung von Panzern in der Verteidigung und die Neugliederung der deutschen NATO-Divisionen 1959". Wehrkunde. 8 (12). 1959.

== Notes ==
Military offices
Preceded by none	Commander of XV Army Corps; 10 October 1938 – 16 November 1940	Succeeded by Panzergruppe 3
Preceded by XV Army Corps	Commander of Panzergruppe 3; 16 November 1940 – 4 October 1941	Succeeded by Generaloberst Georg-Hans Reinhardt
Preceded by General der Infanterie Karl-Heinrich von Stülpnagel	Commander of 17. Armee; 5 October 1941 – 19 April 1942	Succeeded by Generaloberst Hans von Salmuth
Preceded by Generaloberst Richard Ruoff	Commander of 4. Panzer-Armee; 31 May 1942 – 26 November 1943	Succeeded by Generaloberst Erhard Raus
