= 17th Army (Wehrmacht) =

Field army of Nazi Germany during WWII

- German: 17. Armee
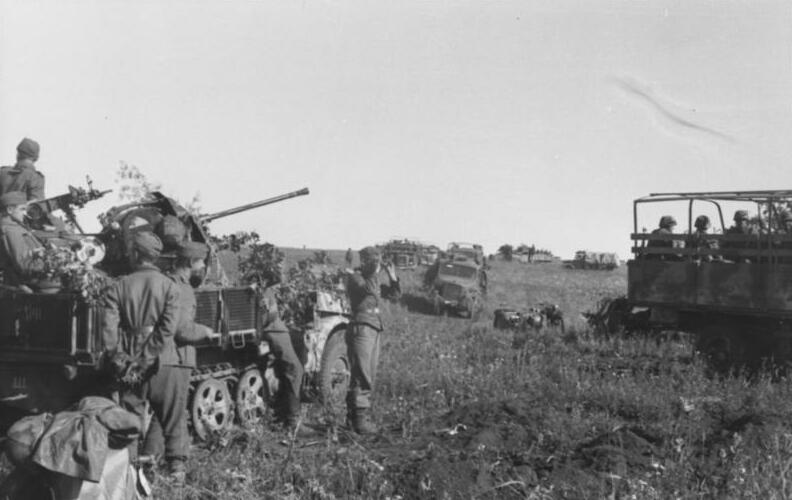
- June 1943, German troops in Southern Russia
- Active: 20 December 1940 – 7 May 1945
- Country: Germany
- Branch: German army ( Wehrmacht)
- Size: Field army

Commanders
- Notable commanders: Carl-Heinrich von Stülpnagel; Hermann Hoth; Richard Ruoff; Erwin Jänecke; Karl Allmendinger; Friedrich Schulz; Wilhelm Hasse

The German Seventeenth Army (German: 17. Armee) was a field army of Nazi Germany during World War II.

== Operation Barbarossa ==
On 22 June 1941, the 17th Army was part of Army Group South when Nazi Germany launched Operation Barbarossa and invaded the Soviet Union. From 1 July, the Hungarian "Mobile Corps" (Gyorshadtest) was subordinated to the 17th Army. Along with 1st Panzer Army, the 17th Army encircled Soviet forces in central Ukraine during the Battle of Uman. Approximately 100,000 Soviet troops were captured. The 17th Army participated in the Battle of Kiev. Army Group South was ordered to resume the offensive, with the objective of capturing Rostov-on-Don, the gateway to the Caucasus oil fields, and Kharkov, a major center of heavy industry for the Soviet Union.

In October 1941, the army came under the command of Hermann Hoth, who was convicted post-war in the High Command Trial. Hoth was an active supporter of the war of annihilation (Vernichtungskrieg) against the Soviet Union. He called upon his men to understand the need for "harsh punishment of Jewry". In support of the Severity Order issued by Walter von Reichenau in October 1941, in November 1941 Hoth issued the following directive to troops under his command:

Every sign of active or passive resistance or any sort of machinations on the part of Jewish-Bolshevik agitators are to be immediately and pitilessly exterminated ... These circles are the intellectual supports of Bolshevism, the bearers of its murderous organisation, the helpmates of the partisans. It is the same Jewish class of beings who have done so much damage to our own Fatherland by virtue of their activities against the nation and civilisation, and who promote anti-German tendencies throughout the world, and who will be the harbingers of revenge. Their extermination is a dictate of our own survival.

Under Hoth's command, units of the 17th Army took part in the hunt for and murder of Jews in its territory of control.

== Battle of Stalingrad ==
In 1942, Army Group South was to spearhead the German summer offensive in Russia known as Case Blue. The 17th Army was to give flank protection to 1st Panzer Army as it struck towards the Don River. From June to July, the German 17th Army, the Italian Expeditionary Corps in Russia, and the Romanian 3rd Army were organized as "Army Group Ruoff". In August 1942, Hitler sub-divided Army Group South into two new army groups: Army Group A and Army Group B. Army Group A included the 17th Army, the 1st Panzer Army, and the 4th Panzer Army. Army Group B included the 2nd Army, the 6th Army, the Italian 8th Army, and the Hungarian 2nd Army. By October 1942, the Romanian 3rd Army and the Romanian 4th Army were added to further bolster Army Group B.

While Army Group B struck towards Stalingrad, Army Group A and the 17th Army attacked towards the Caucasus oilfields in what was to be known as the Battle of the Caucasus. However, by December with Soviet forces en-circled the 6th Army at Stalingrad, Army Group A withdrew from Southern Russia but 17th Army was ordered to hold the Kuban bridgehead. Hitler demanded a three-mile road and rail bridge across the Strait of Kerch in spring 1943 to support a push through the Caucasus to Persia, although the Cable Railway (Aerial tramway) which went into operation on 14 July with a daily capacity of one thousand tons was adequate for the defensive needs of the 17th Army in the Kuban bridgehead. Because of frequent earth tremors, vast quantities of extra-strength girders would be required, and their transport would curtail shipments of military material to the Crimea.

== Crimea ==
By October 1943, the 17th Army was forced to retreat from the Kuban bridgehead across the Kerch Strait to Crimea. During the following months, the Red Army pushed back the German forces in the southern Ukraine. In November 1943, they eventually cut off the land-based connection of 17th Army through the Perekop Isthmus. Hitler forbade a sea evacuation of 17th Army because he thought the Red Army could use the Crimean Peninsula to launch air attacks against Romanian oil refineries. By the end of 1943, the Soviet command began landing troops in Kerch Strait.

On 2 February 1944, the 17th Army trapped on Crimea consisted of the V Army Corps with the 73rd German Infantry Division, 98th German Infantry Division, 3rd Romanian Mountain Division and 6th Romanian Cavalry Division, the "Group Conrad" constructed around the German XXXXIX Mountain Corps and the Romanian Cavalry Corps with the 10th Infantry Division and 19th Infantry Division under the Cavalry Corps and the 50th German Infantry Division, 336th German Infantry Division and 9th Romanian Cavalry Division under the XXXXIX Corps, and finally the 1st Romanian Mountain Corps with Fortress Commander Sevastopol and the Romanian 1st Mountain and 2nd Mountain Divisions. Additionally, the 17th Army had the 111th Infantry Division in reserves.

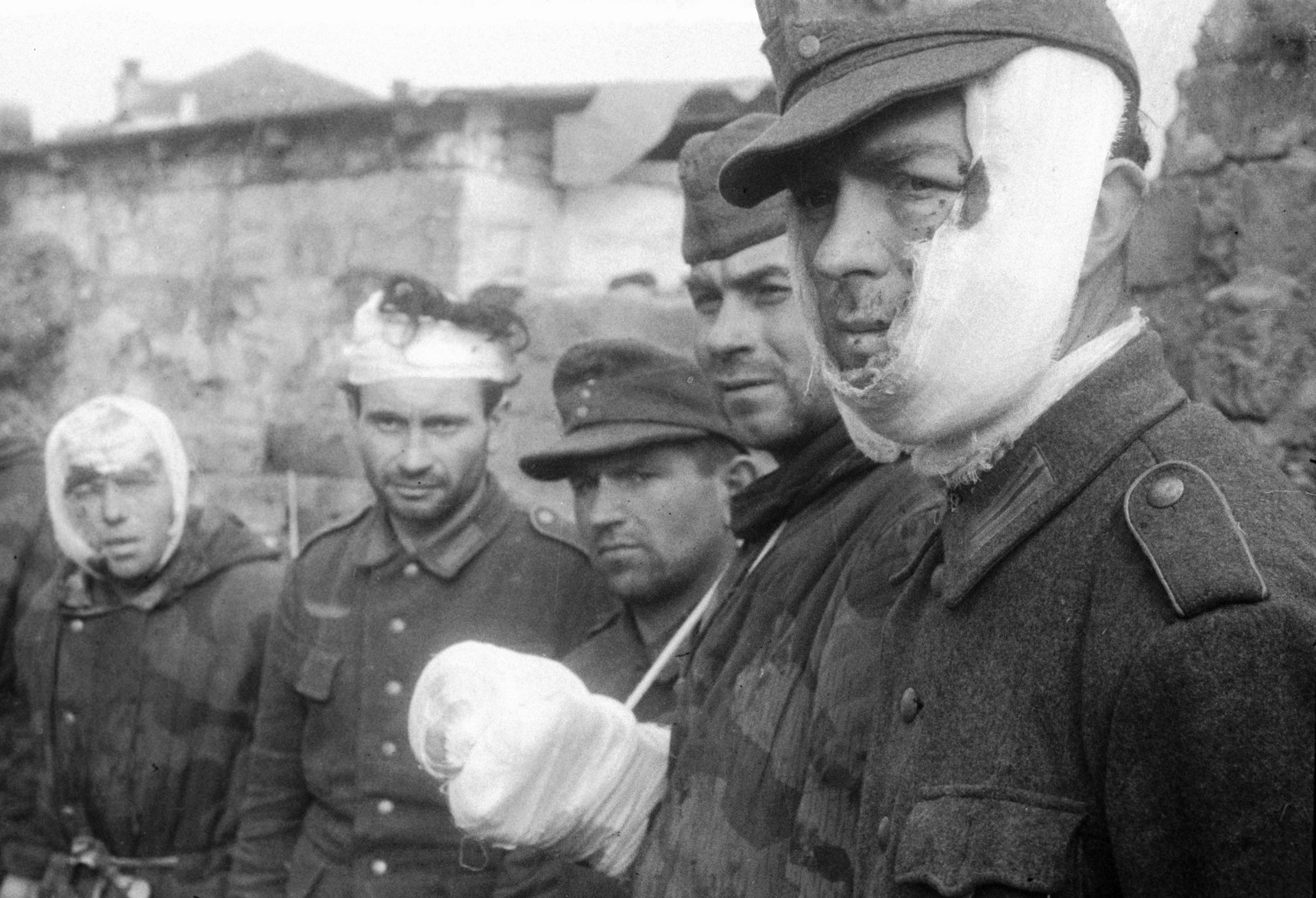
Wounded soldiers of the 17th Army taken prisoner during the liberation of Sevastopol

By 10 April 1944, moving troops near the Sivash and together with an attack at the Perekop Isthmus forced 17th Army to fall back to Sevastopol. The German Supreme Command of the Armed Forces (Oberkommando der Wehrmacht, or OKW) intended to hold Sevastopol as a fortress, much as the Red Army had done during the first battle for the Crimea from 1941 to 1942. Inadequate repair to the defenses of Sevastopol made this impossible and, on 9 May 1944, Sevastopol fell in less than one month after the start of the battle.

The Army lost much of its heavy equipment in the Crimea. Considerable losses were suffered in terms of men lost in battle and losses associated with the sea evacuation. The commander-in-chief of the 17th Army, General Karl Allmendinger, described the presentation of the Knight's Cross of the Iron Cross to Kriegsmarine officers commanding the sea evacuation as an outrage, believing the naval evacuation was poorly carried out because of the abandonment of some units. Historian Robert Forczyk noted that the German Army was quick to point to the Kriegsmarine and the Romanians as scapegoats during the final campaign in the Crimea, and that Allmendinger and the other commanders of the 17th Army had committed their own fair share of mistakes in Crimea and in the final weeks of fighting around Sevastopol.

== Eastern Front mainland, 1944/45 ==
The Army was subsequently reorganized and continued to fight on the Eastern Front, including in the Battle of Bautzen.

On 1 January 1945, the 17th Army (then under Army Group A) contained the 78th, 320th, 544th and 545th Volksgrenadier Divisions as well as the 359th and 371st Infantry Divisions. These six divisions had a total strength of 57,088 men.

== Subordinate foreign units ==
- Hungarian Mobile Corps - 1 July 1941 to 24 November 1941
- Italian Expeditionary Corps in Russia - 3 June to July 1942
- Slovak Mobile Command (Pilfousek Brigade), reorganized in early August 1941 as Slovak 1st Division

== Commanders ==
No.	Portrait	Commander	Took office	Left office	Time in office
1	Carl-Heinrich von Stülpnagel	General der Infanterie; Carl-Heinrich von Stülpnagel (1886–1944)	20 December 1940	4 October 1941	288 days
2	Hermann Hoth	Generaloberst; Hermann Hoth (1885–1971)	5 October 1941	19 April 1942	196 days
3	Hans von Salmuth	Generaloberst; Hans von Salmuth (1888–1962)	20 April 1942	31 May 1942	41 days
4	Richard Ruoff	Generaloberst; Richard Ruoff (1883–1967)	1 June 1942	24 June 1943	1 year, 23 days
5	Erwin Jaenecke	Generaloberst; Erwin Jaenecke (1890–1960)	25 June 1943	1 March 1944	250 days
6	Ferdinand Schörner	Generalfeldmarschall; Ferdinand Schörner (1892–1973)	2 March 1944	31 March 1944	29 days
(5)	Erwin Jaenecke	Generaloberst; Erwin Jaenecke (1890–1960)	1 April 1944	28 April 1944	27 days
7	Karl Allmendinger	General der Infanterie; Karl Allmendinger (1891–1965)	1 May 1944	25 July 1944	85 days
8	Friedrich Schulz	General der Infanterie; Friedrich Schulz (1897–1976)	26 July 1944	30 March 1945	247 days
9	Wilhelm Hasse	General der Infanterie; Wilhelm Hasse (1894–1945)	1 April 1945	7 May 1945	36 days
