= Walter Weiss =

Walter Weiss may refer to:

- Walter Weiß (1890–1967), German army general
- Walt Weiss (born 1963), American baseball player and manager
