= Otto Schulz (admiral) =

- Born: 12 March 1900
- Died: 28 March 1974 (aged 74)
- Military career
- Allegiance: Nazi Germany
- Branch: Kriegsmarine
- Rank: Konteradmiral
- Commands: Seekommandant Krim
- Conflicts: World War II
- Awards: Knight's Cross of the Iron Cross

Otto Schulz (12 March 1900 – 28 March 1974) was a German admiral during World War II. He was a recipient of the Knight's Cross of the Iron Cross of Nazi Germany.

Otto Schulz received the Knight's Cross of the Iron Cross on 17 May 1944 for the evacuation of the 17th Army from the Crimean peninsula. The commander-in-chief of the 17th Army, General Karl Allmendinger, described the presentation of the Knight's Cross of the Iron Cross to Kriegsmarine officers commanding the sea evacuation as an outrage, believing the naval evacuation was poorly carried out because of the abandonment of some units. Historian Robert Forczyk noted that the German Army was quick to point to the Kriegsmarine and the Romanians as scapegoats during the final campaign in the Crimea, and that Allmendinger and the other commanders of the 17th Army had committed their own fair share of mistakes in Crimea and in the final weeks of fighting around Sevastopol.

== Awards ==
- Clasp to the Iron Cross (1939) 2nd Class (15 April 1940)
- War Merit Cross 1st Class with Swords (30 January 1942)
- Naval Artillery War Badge (1944)
- Knight's Cross of the Iron Cross on 17 May 1944 as Konteradmiral and Seekommandant Krim (sea commander Crimea)
