= 389th Infantry Division =

German 389th Infantry Division
- German: 389. Infanterie-Division
- Active: 27 January 1942–1945
- Country: Nazi Germany
- Branch: Army
- Type: Infantry
- Size: Division, 15,000
- Garrison/HQ: Milowitz near Prague
- Nickname: Rheingold Division (Rhine Gold Division)
- Engagements: German-Soviet War Second Battle of Kharkov Battle of Stalingrad

The 389th Infantry Division was a German division of the Wehrmacht in the Second World War, which fought for example in the Battle of Stalingrad. It was formed on 27 January 1942 in Milowitz.

== History ==
The 389th Infantry division was formed on 27 January 1942 as a division of the 18th mobilization wave on the training area in Milowitz near Prague. The Motto of the division was "Der Sonne Rad mit Schild und Speer, dem Rhein, dem Reich zu Wehr und Ehr".

It was designed as a "Sturm- und Stoß" division (English: storm and impulse division), whose soldiers had to run through a hard training and a long conscription to fight on the foremost part of the front. The soldiers were mostly veterans of the previous campaigns on the Western Front and the Invasion of Poland. From May 1942 onwards, it was employed in battles on the Eastern Front as a part of the 6th Army under the command of General der Panzertruppe Friedrich Paulus. After he had taken over the command in January 1942, the Red Army launched an offensive near the city of Kharkov. The German troops could repel the attack and conducted a successful counter-offensive, during which they encircled the Soviet formations. In this engagement, the Red Army sustained great casualties.

The 389th Infantry Division also participated in the German summer offensive Operation Blau, which had the aim to capture the Caucasus and Stalingrad. Stalingrad should then be used to prevent the Soviet forces from using the Volga as a supply route. The 6th Army should advance to Stalingrad. After the start of the offensive on 28 June 1942, Axis forces of Army Group B could advance quickly. By 23 August, German units reached the Volga north of the city. It was then planned that the 6th Army should encircle the Soviet 62nd and 64th Army together with 4th Panzer Army. The 4th Panzer Army started the attack regularly on 29 August. However, the 6th Army was still confronted with a Soviet counter-attack. Therefore, it could only attack 3 days later. This gave the Soviet forces to withdraw from the future pocket. During the Battle of Stalingrad, the 389th Infantry Division was the main force of the failed attack on the tractor factory. During the Soviet counter-offensive beginning under the codename Operation Uranus on 19 November 1942, the division's remnants were captured after the Axis capitulation on 2 February 1943.

The division was reformed from 17 February 1943 onwards in France. Its forces consisted of survivors and persons, who had been in furlough. In the end of September 1943, the 389th Infantry Division was redeployed on the Eastern Front, where it took part in fierce engagements in Dnjepr section causing high casualties among the division's forces. Afterwards, on 25 January, the 2nd Ukrainian Front conducted a massive attack, due to which forces of the 57th Infantry Division were sent to help the 389th Infantry Division. However, the support arrived too late and the division could just take up remnants of the 389. ID. As the 2nd Ukrainian Front then marched North, this division was pushed into the Korsun-Cherkassy Pocket.

Again, the 389. ID was reformed in Hungary in March 1944 and employed as part of Army Group North in the Kurland Pocket, where it fought until February 1945. Then, it was redeployed to Western Prussia. In the end of the war, it was captured by Soviet forces on the Hel Peninsula.

== Commanders ==
- Generalleutnant Erwin Jaenecke (February 1942 – November 1942)
- Generalmajor Erich Magnus (November 1942 – January 1943)
- Generalmajor Martin Lattmann (January 1943 – April 1943)
- Generalmajor Erwin Gerlach (April 1943 – November 1943)
- Generalleutnant Kurt Kruse (November 1943 – March 1944)
- Generalmajor Paul Herbert Forster (March 1944 – April 1944)
- General der Infanterie Walther Hahm (April 1944 – September 1944)
- Generalleutnant Fritz Becker (September 1944 – End)

== Organization ==
- Infanterie-Regiment 544 (Kassel)
- Infanterie-Regiment 545 (Wiesbaden)
- Infanterie-Regiment 546 (Nuremberg)
- Artillerie-Regiment 389
  - I. Btl.
  - II. Btl.
  - III. Btl.
  - IV. Btl.
- Feldersatz-Bataillon 389 - Field Replacement battalion
- Pionier-Bataillon 389 - Pioneer battalion
- Panzerjäger-Abteilung 389 - Tank hunter battalion
- Aufklärungs-Abteilung 389 - Reconnaissance battalion
- Füsilier-Bataillon 389 - Fusilier battalion
- Infanterie-Divisions-Nachrichten-Abteilung 389 - Signals battalion
- Infanterie-Divisions-Nachschubführer 389- Supply battalion

== Recipients of the Knight's Cross of the Iron Cross ==
The following members of the 389th Infantry Division were awarded the Knight's Cross of the Iron Cross, Germany's highest military decoration of the Second World War:

- Erwin Jaenecke, Generalleutnant, commander of the 389th Infantry Division (9 October 1942)
- Reinhard Hörning, Hauptmann der Reserve, commander of the I. Bataillon, Grenadier-Regiment 546; awarded 22 August 1943 (posthumous). Killed in action at Stalingrad, 17 October 1942.
- Wilhelm Durchdenwald, Oberleutnant, commander of the II. Bataillon, Grenadier-Regiment 544; awarded 13 November 1942. Killed in action at Stalingrad, 17 October 1942.
- Hans Gütschow, Leutnant der Reserve, company commander in Grenadier-Regiment 545; awarded 25 October 1942. Missing in action at Stalingrad, January 1943.
- Hugo Zumfelde, Hauptmann, commander of the II. Bataillon, Grenadier-Regiment 546; awarded 9 December 1944.
