= XV Army Corps (Wehrmacht) =

- XV. Armeekorps
- Active: 10 October 1938–16 November 1940
- Country: Nazi Germany
- Branch: Army
- Type: Corps
- Engagements: World War II Invasion of Poland Battle of France

Insignia
- Abbreviation: XV AK

The XV Army Corps / XV AK (German: XV. Armee-Korps) was a corps level command of the German Army before and in the early stages of World War II.

It was set up on 10 October 1938. It was also known as Gruppe Hoth / Panzergruppe Hoth during the invasion of France. It was reorganized into Panzergruppe 3 on 16 November 1940.

== Combat chronicle ==
The Corps participated in the Invasion of Poland in 1939 as part of 10th Army, Army Group South. It was part of 4th Army, Army Group A in the invasion of France in 1940.

== Organisation ==
The Corps had the following organisation on 8 June 1940:

5th Panzer Division
7th Panzer Division
2nd Infantry Division (mot.)

== Commanders ==
XV Corps was commanded throughout its existence by General der Infanterie (later Generaloberst) Hermann Hoth.
