= V Army Corps (Wehrmacht) =

- V. Armeekorps
- Active: October 1934 – 8 May 1945
- Country: Nazi Germany
- Branch: Army
- Size: Corps
- Engagements: World War II: Battle of Belgium; Battle of France; Battle of Brody (1941); Battle of Uman; Battle of Rostov (1942); Kuban bridgehead; Crimean Offensive; Battle of Halbe

Commanders
- Notable commanders: Richard Ruoff

V Army Corps (V. Armeekorps) was a corps in the German Army during World War II.

== Commanders ==
- Infantry General (General der Infanterie) Hermann Geyer, 16 May 1935 – 30 April 1939
- Infantry General (General der Infanterie) Richard Ruoff, 1 May 1939 – 1 June 1942
- Infantry General (General der Infanterie) Wilhelm Wetzel, 1 June 1942 – 1 July 1943
- Infantry General (General der Infanterie) Karl Allmendinger, 1 July 1943 – 1 May 1944
- Lieutenant-General (Generalleutnant) Hermann Böhme, 1 May 1944 – 4 May 1944
- Lieutenant-General (Generalleutnant) Friedrich-Wilhelm Müller, 4 May 1944 – 2 June 1944
- Infantry General (General der Infanterie) Dr. Franz Beyer, 2 June 1944 – 19 July 1944
- Artillery General (General der Artillerie) Dr. Ing. Kurt Wäger, 26 January 1945 – 8 May 1945

== First formation ==
The V corps was formed a Corps level formation of the 17th Army assigned to Army Group South. By 1943, the deteriorating situation on the Eastern Front forced the evacuation of the V corps along with the rest of 17th army to the Crimea. However, Red Army advances in the Dnieper Campaign forced more and more divisions to be diverted to the newly reconstituted 6th Army in an ultimately unsuccessful attempt to stem the onslaught. By October 1943, the whole of 17th army order of battle consisted of just two German and four Romanian divisions, all of which were under strength. During the course of the Crimean Offensive, the Red Army captured the Peninsula and marched the remnants of 17th army, including most of the V Corps, into captivity.

== Second formation ==
In January 1945 a new V Army Corps was set up in Military District XIII, for which remnants of the staff of the 221st Security Division and the 20th Luftwaffe Storm Division were used, and deployed in the area of the 4th Panzer Army. On April 19, the V Corps with the 35th and 36th SS Grenadier Divisions and the 275th and 342nd Infantry Divisions, were subordinated to the 9th Army, which was surrounded by the Red Army.
When on April 28, General Busse ordered the 9th Army to break out of the Halbe pocket, the V Army Corps organized the protection of the southern flank. The Corps suffered heavy casualties and the survivors went into western captivity by crossing the destroyed Elbe bridge at Tangermünde.

== Area of operations ==
- Western Front - September 1939 - May 1940
- France - May 1940 - June 1941
- Eastern Front, southern sector - June 1941 - May 1944
- Crimea - May 1944 - July 1944 (bulk destroyed in May 1944; command disbanded in July 1944)
- Eastern Front - January 1945 - April 1945; command reestablished and then destroyed in the Halbe Pocket in April 1945

== See also ==
- List of German corps in World War II

== Notes ==
- Georg Tessin. Verbände und Truppen der deutschen Wehrmacht und Waffen-SS 1939-1945. Volume 2. Osnabrück: Biblio Verlag, 1973
