= Hans von Salmuth =

German general (1888-1962)

Hans Eberhard Kurt von Salmuth
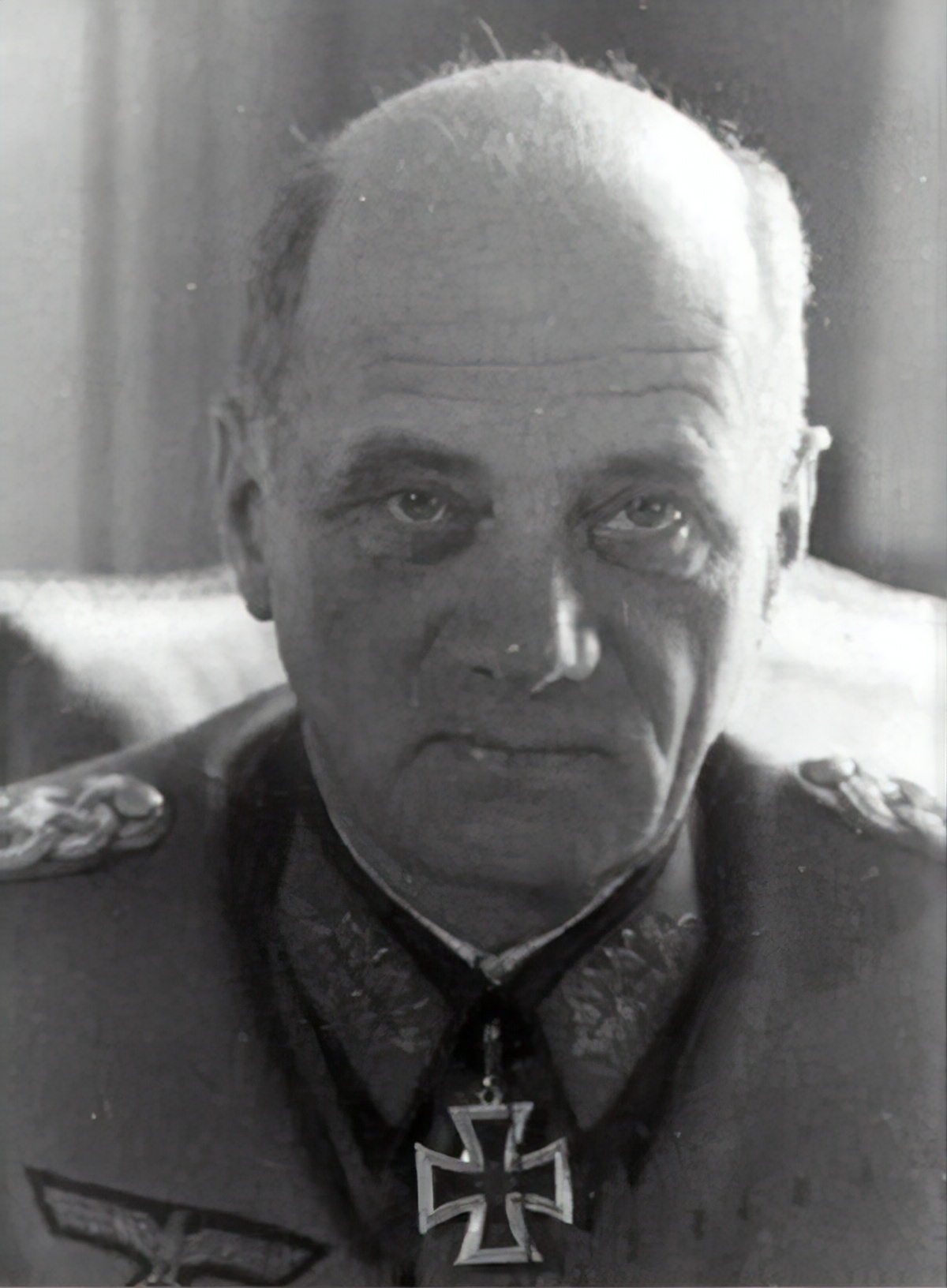
- Von Salmuth in 1943
- Born: 11 November 1888; Metz, Elsass-Lothringen, Germany
- Died: 1 January 1962 (aged 73); Heidelberg, Baden-Württemberg, West Germany
- Military career
- Allegiance: Nazi Germany
- Branch: German Army
- Service years: 1907–1945
- Rank: Generaloberst
- Unit: Army Group B
- Conflicts: World War I World War II
- Awards: Knight's Cross of the Iron Cross

Hans Eberhard Kurt Freiherr von Salmuth (11 November 1888 – 1 January 1962) was a German general of the Wehrmacht during World War II. Salmuth commanded several armies on the Eastern Front, and the Fifteenth Army in France during the D-Day invasion. Following the war, he was tried in the High Command Trial, as part of the Subsequent Nuremberg Trials. He was found guilty of war crimes and crimes against humanity and sentenced to 20 years. He was released in 1953.

== World War II ==
Hans von Salmuth, son of Oberstleutnant Friedrich Ernst Werner Anton Freiherr von Salmuth (1853–1926), joined the Prussian Army in 1907 and served in the German Army in World War I. Salmuth remained in the army and served as chief of staff of II Corps from 1934 to 1937. He was assigned as chief of staff to the First Army Group Command. In 1938 he was transferred as Chief of Staff to the Second Army. In 1939 he was Chief of Staff for Army Group North, commanded by General Fedor von Bock, during the invasion of Poland. Salmuth continued as Chief of Staff to Bock, when the latter was given command of Army Group B for the invasion of Belgium and France, in May 1940. In July 1940 Salmuth was awarded the Knight's Cross of the Iron Cross. On 1 August 1940, he was promoted to lieutenant-general.

In 1941, Salmuth was assigned to the Eastern Front and given command of XXX Corps. He participated in Operation Barbarossa and took part in the Battle of Sevastopol. As all German corps on the Eastern Front, Salmuth's corps implemented the criminal Commissar Order. In 1942, he was made acting commander of the Seventeenth Army (20 April 1942 to 1 June 1942). For a short time, 6 June 1942 to 15 July 1942, he was assigned to command the Fourth Army, replacing the former commander, Gotthard Heinrici, who went on leave. In mid-July 1942 he was given command of the Second Army.

In January 1943 Salmuth was promoted to Generaloberst, the second highest German officer rank in the Wehrmacht. At that time, he was faced with the Soviet Voronezh-Kastornensk Operation, in which the Second Army was almost destroyed. On 3 February 1943, he was given command of the Fourth Army until July 1943. In August 1943, Salmuth was reassigned to command the Fifteenth Army stationed at Pas-de-Calais, France. Salmuth was relieved of his command, in late August 1944, following the disintegration of the German front line, after the Allied breakout from Normandy (Operation Cobra), receiving no further command.

== Trial and conviction ==
Salmuth was tried in the High Command Trial, as part of the Subsequent Nuremberg Trials. Salmuth was found guilty of war crimes and crimes against humanity, including murder and mis-treatment of Soviet prisoners of war, and of murder, deportation, and hostage-taking of civilians in occupied countries. He was sentenced to 20 years imprisonment. His sentence was reviewed in 1951, commuted to 12 years and backdated to June 1945. Salmuth was released in July 1953. He died in 1962.

== Service record ==
Commissions

- XXX Corps - 10 May 1941 - 27 December 1941
- Seventeenth Army - 20 April 1942 - 1 June 1942
- Fourth Army - 6 June 1942 - 15 July 1942
- Second Army - 15 July 1942 - 3 February 1943
- Fourth Army - c. June 1943 - 31 July 1943
- Fifteenth Army - 1 August 1943 - 25 August 1944

Awards

- Knight's Cross of the Iron Cross on 19 July 1940 as Generalleutnant and Chief of the general staff of Heeresgruppe B

Military offices
Preceded by Generalleutnant Eugen Ott	Commander of XXX. Armeekorps; May 10, 1941 – December 27, 1941	Succeeded by General der Artillerie Maximilian Fretter-Pico
Preceded by Generaloberst Hermann Hoth	Commander of 17. Armee; April 20, 1942 – May 31, 1942	Succeeded by Generaloberst Richard Ruoff
Preceded by Generaloberst Gotthard Heinrici	Commander of 4. Armee; June 6, 1942 - July 15, 1942	Succeeded by Generaloberst Gotthard Heinrici
Preceded by General Maximilian Reichsfreiherr von Weichs	Commander of 2. Armee; July 14, 1942 - February 3, 1943	Succeeded by General Walter Weiß
Preceded by Generaloberst Gotthard Heinrici	Commander of 4. Armee; June 1943 - July 31, 1943	Succeeded by Generaloberst Gotthard Heinrici
Preceded by General Heinrich von Vietinghoff gennant Scheel	Commander of 15. Armee; August 8, 1943 - August 24, 1944	Succeeded by General Gustav-Adolf von Zangen
