= Hermann Geyer =

German general (1882-1946)

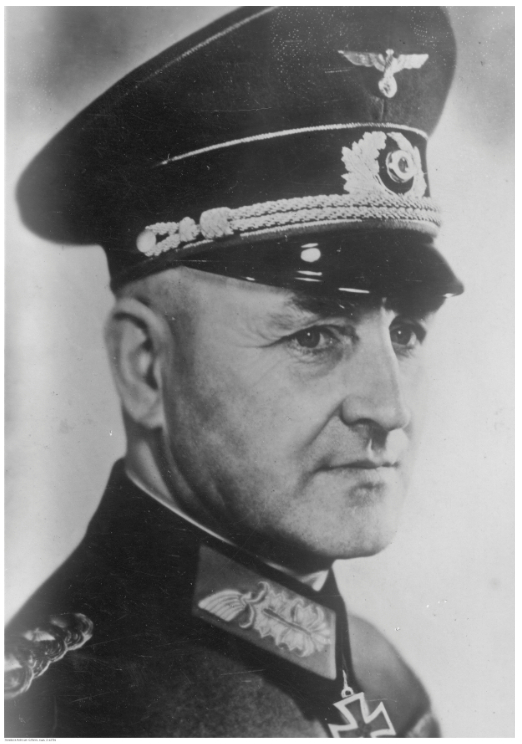
- Geyer, July 1940
- Born: 7 July 1882; Stuttgart, Kingdom of Württemberg, German Empire
- Died: 10 April 1946 (aged 63) near Wildsee, French occupation zone in Germany
- Military career
- Allegiance: German Empire; Weimar Republic; Nazi Germany
- Branch: Army of Württemberg; Reichswehr; German Army
- Service years: 1900–1943
- Rank: General der Infanterie
- Commands: V Army Corps; IX Army Corps
- Conflicts: World War I; World War II; Battle of Belgium; Battle of France; Battle of Dunkirk; Operation Barbarossa; Battle of Białystok–Minsk; Battle of Smolensk (1941); Yelnya Offensive; Battle of Moscow
- Awards: Knight's Cross of the Iron Cross; Clasp to the Iron Cross, 1st and 2nd class

Hermann Geyer (7 July 1882 – 10 April 1946) was a German professional army officer who served the German Empire, the Weimar Republic and Nazi Germany. He fought in both world wars and attained the rank of General der Infanterie. In the First World War, he held both command and staff positions but for most of the war served on the General Staff. During the interwar years, he was the commander of Wehrkreis (military district) V in southwest Germany until he was dismissed by Adolf Hitler for expressing skepticism about his war plans. Recalled to military service in the Second World War, Geyer commanded the IX Army Corps until he was dismissed in December 1941 after the failure of the German assault on Moscow. He was awarded the Knight's Cross of the Iron Cross, retired in 1943 and committed suicide after the end of the war.

== Early life ==
Hermann Geyer was born in Stuttgart in the Kingdom of Württemberg. He sought a career as a professional army officer and joined the Army of Württemberg as a Fahnenjunker (officer cadet) with Grenadier Regiment 119 "Queen Olga" (1st Württemberg) in Stuttgart on 4 July 1900. He was promoted to Fahnrich on 25 February 1901, and to Leutnant on 18 October. He attended the Prussian War Academy from October 1909 to July 1912, being promoted to Oberleutnant on 19 February 1910. He was assigned to the General Staff in March 1913.

== World War I ==
With the outbreak of the First World War, Geyer was promoted to Hauptmann and remained assigned to the General Staff in August 1914. In May 1916, he was transferred to Fusilier Regiment 33 (East Prussian) and fought at the front as a company commander and the commander of the 1st battalion before being transferred back to the General Staff on 3 July 1916. For a short time, Geyer was a member of the staff of the 199th Infantry Division before being reassigned to the General Staff on 15 September 1916, under Generalfeldmarschall Paul von Hindenburg, the Chief of the General Staff, where he remained until the end of the war.

On 1 January 1918, the German Army published a pamphlet written by Geyer entitled The Attack in Position Warfare. This described infantry infiltration tactics, the role of following supporting forces and the role of aviation. These tactics were used in the 1918 German spring offensive or Kaiserschlacht (Kaiser's Battle).

On 13 November 1918, Geyer was assigned to the Armistice Commission in Spa and, from 14 March 1919, he was a member of the German peace delegation at Versailles. During the course of the war, Gayer was awarded the House Order of Hohenzollern, the Iron Cross, 1st and 2nd class, and many other decorations.

== Interwar Period ==
Under the Weimar Republic, Geyer was retained in the reduced 100,000 man army, the Reichswehr, and initially was assigned to the Ministry of the Reichswehr. In March 1922, he was assigned to the staff of the commandant's office at the Döberitz military training area and promoted to Major. On 1 May 1922, he became a company commander in the 13th (Württemberg) Infantry Regiment. In 1923, he was assigned to the staff of the 5th Division and, on 1 February 1927, he was promoted to Oberstleutnant and commanded the 2nd battalion of the 13th Infantry Regiment. On 1 October 1928, he returned to the Reichswehr Ministry, where he became a department head on 1 November 1928, and was promoted to Oberst on 1 February 1930. On 1 February 1931, he was appointed commander of the 17th Infantry Regiment in Braunschweig. Geyer relinquished this command on 1 October 1932 and was appointed Infanterieführer V and promoted to Generalmajor on 1 December 1932.

Following the Nazi seizure of power, Geyer was appointed chief of staff of Group Command 2 on 1 February 1933, and promoted to Generalleutnant on 1 January 1934. He was named the commander of the 5th Division and commander of Wehrkreis V in Stuttgart on 1 August 1934. In March 1935, the Reichswehr was reorganized into the German Army and subsequently began an expansion from seven to twenty-one divisions, organized into seven corps. On 16 May 1935, Geyer was named the commanding general of the V Army Corps and retained the command of Wehrkreis V. He was promoted to General der Infanterie on 1 August 1936. By January 1938, Geyer ranked number sixteen in the seniority of German Army officers.

Geyer retained his command in Stuttgart until 30 April 1939 when he, along with three other high-ranking officers, was dismissed early because of his critical assessments of the likely outcome of the war of aggression being planned by Adolf Hitler. Because of the realistic viewpoint he presented regarding what was militarily possible in 1938, he was deemed politically unreliable, and Hitler ordered his removal.

== Second World War ==
Geyer was recalled to military service on 25 August 1939 just before the start of the Second World War, and was named commanding general of the IX Army Corps, which he led during the Battle of France and the German invasion of the Soviet Union. During his war service, he was awarded the Clasp to the Iron Cross, 1st and 2nd class and the Knight's Cross of the Iron Cross. On 31 December 1941, following the Russian counteroffensive that stopped the German advance on Moscow, he was relieved of command and transferred to the Führer Reserve. Not being assigned another position, Geyer was discharged from the Wehrmacht and retired on 31 December 1943.

== Death ==
After his retirement, Geyer returned to Württemberg and lived in Höfen an der Enz. At the end of the war, he was serving as the Bürgermeister of Höfen, which was located in the French occupation zone. When General Marie-Pierre Kœnig, the commander-in-chief of the French occupation forces, ordered displaced Germans from the East to be housed in refugee camps in Höfen, Geyer refused to carry out the order. He wrote a letter of protest to General Kœnig and took his own life on 10 April 1946.

== Awards and decorations ==
- Knight's Cross of the Iron Cross on 25 June 1940 as General der Infanterie and commander of IX. Armeekorps
- House Order of Hohenzollern
- Iron Cross (1914) 1st and 2nd class
- Clasp to the Iron Cross 1st and 2nd class
- Military Merit Order of Bavaria, 4th class with swords
- Knight's Cross 1st class with swords of the Albert Order
- Knight's Cross 1st class with swords of the Friedrich Order
- Knight's Cross of the Württemberg Military Merit Order
- Hanseatic Cross of Hamburg
- Friedrich-August Cross, 1st class
- Military Merit Cross of Austria-Hungary, 3rd class with war decoration
- Liakat Medal in silver with swords
- Order of Military Merit of Bulgaria

Military offices
Preceded by None	Commander of V Armeekorps; 16 May 1935 - 30 April 1939	Succeeded by General der Infanterie Richard Ruoff
Preceded by General der Artillerie Friedrich Dollmann	Commander of IX Armeekorps; 25 October 1939 - 31 December 1941	Succeeded by General der Infanterie Hans Schmidt
