= Richard Ruoff =

German Nazi general (1883–1967)

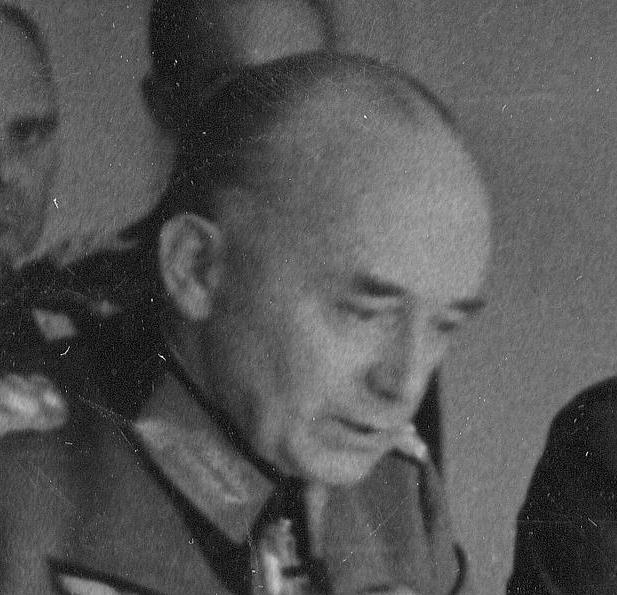
- Ruoff in March 1943
- Born: Karl Richard Ruoff; 18 August 1883; Meßbach, German Empire
- Died: 30 March 1967 (aged 83); Tübingen, West Germany
- Relatives: ∞ 1909 Martha Fuchs; 4 children
- Military career
- Allegiance: German Empire; Weimar Republic; Nazi Germany
- Branch: German Army
- Service years: 1903–1943
- Rank: Generaloberst
- Commands: 4th Panzer Army; 17th Army
- Conflicts: World War I World War II
- Awards: Knight's Cross of the Iron Cross

Karl Richard Ruoff (18 August 1883 – 30 March 1967) was a general in the Wehrmacht of Nazi Germany during World War II. He commanded the 4th Panzer Army and the 17th Army on the Eastern Front.

== Life ==
After Ruoff graduated from Gymnasium in Heilbronn, Kingdom of Württemberg, he joined the 10th Württemberg Infantry Regiment No. 180 of the Württemberg Army in Tübingen as a flag cadet on 15 April 1903. He was promoted to 2nd lieutenant on 18 August 1904 with patent from 19 August 1903, was battalion adjutant in 1910 and, as a first lieutenant (since 18 August 1912), was appointed to regimental adjutant in February 1913.

With the outbreak of the First World War, Ruoff was promoted to captain on 28 November 1914 and was used several times as a company commander. During the course of the war he was adjutant of the 51st Reserve Infantry Brigade and assigned to the general staff of the 26th Reserve Division. For his achievements, Ruoff was awarded both classes of the Iron Cross, the Knight's Cross of the Order of Military Merit, the Knight's Cross 1st Class of the Order of Frederick and the Wounded Badge in Black.

=== World War II ===
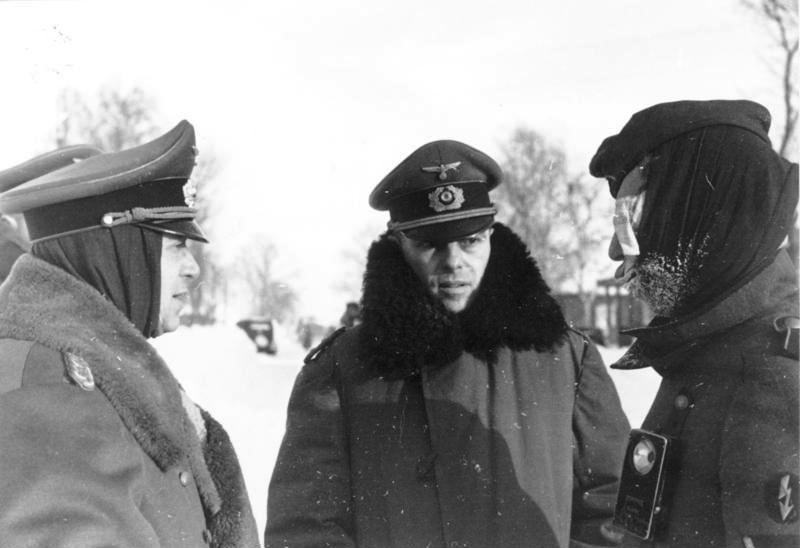
Ruoff (left) and Hans Röttiger (center) in the Soviet Union, November 1941

Ruoff took command of V Army Corps on 1 May 1939, and led this unit into World War II. He also concurrently commanded V Wehrkreis in Stuttgart. Ruoff then was given command of the 4th Panzer Army from 8 January 1942 to 31 May 1942. The 4th Panzer Army was part of Army Group A which was formed when Army Group South was split into two formations for the summer offensive of 1942.

Ruoff commanded the 17th Army from 1 June 1942 to 24 June 1943. The 17th Army was also part of Army Group A. Ruoff was the commander of the 17th Army when, on 3 June 1942, the Italian Expeditionary Corps in Russia (CSIR) was briefly subordinated to it. From June to July, the German 17th Army, the CSIR, and the Romanian 3rd Army were organized as "Army Group Ruoff". By July 1942, Ruoff lost the Italian unit. The CSIR was subsumed by the larger Italian Army in Russia (Armata Italiana in Russia, or ARMIR) and transferred to Army Group B (Heeresgruppe B).

During the late summer, as part of Army Group A, Ruoff and the 17th Army attacked towards the Caucasus oilfields. By December, Soviet forces had destroyed the armies defending its flanks (including the ARMIR) and had en-circled the German 6th Army at Stalingrad. Army Group B was withdrawn from southern Russia but Ruoff and the 17th Army were ordered to hold the "Kuban bridgehead." In June 1943, he was moved to the command reserve, and saw no further action during the war.

Serious allegations of war crimes were levied against the 17th Army under Ruoff's command in the 1943 Krasnodar Trial conducted by the military tribunal of the Soviet North Caucasian Front. However, post-war, the Soviet Union did not seek Ruoff's extradition.

== Command history ==
- General Officer Commanding, 4th Panzer Army, Eastern Front - 1942
- General Officer Commanding, 17th Army, Eastern Front - 1942 to 1943

== Awards and decorations ==
- Iron Cross (1914)
- Knight's Cross of the Military Merit Order (Württemberg)
- Knight's Cross, First Class of the Friedrich Order (Württemberg)
- Repetition Clasp 1939 to the Iron Cross 1914, 2nd and 1st Class
- Winter Battle in the East 1941–42 Medal
- Knight's Cross of the Iron Cross on 30 June 1941 as General der Infanterie and commander of V. Armeekorps

== See also ==
- Battle of the Caucasus
- Battle of Stalingrad

Military offices
Preceded by General der Infanterie Hermann Geyer	Commander of V. Armeekorps; 1 May 1939 – 12 January 1942	Succeeded by General der Infanterie Wilhelm Wetzel
Preceded by Generaloberst Erich Höpner	Commander of 4. Panzer-Armee; 8 January 1942 – 31 May 1942	Succeeded by Generaloberst Hermann Hoth
Preceded by Generaloberst Hans von Salmuth	Commander of 17. Armee; 1 June 1942 – 24 June 1943	Succeeded by Generaloberst Erwin Jaenecke
