= 545th Volksgrenadier Division =

German Army unit in World War II

The 545th Volksgrenadier Division (German: 545. Volksgrenadier-Division) was a Volksgrenadier infantry division of the German Army during World War II, active from 1944 to 1945.

== History ==
=== 545th Grenadier Division ===
The division was created as the 545th Grenadier Division around 10 July 1944, in Military District XII (Wiesbaden) as a so-called Sperrdivision ("blocking division") belonging to the 29th Aufstellungswelle ("Wave of formations"). Kampf-Marsch-battalions 1049, 1051, and 1052 were utilized for its establishment. From August 1944, the division was placed under the command of the 17th Army (Army Group North Ukraine) and deployed to the Krosno area in Poland. On 14 September 1944, elements of Grenadier Regiment 1070, an independent Army unit, were incorporated into the division, and the 2nd Battalion of Grenadier Regiment 1136 was redesignated as Fusilier Battalion 545.

On 9 October 1944, the 545th Grenadier Division was redesignated as the 545th Volksgrenadier Division. The reorganization was intended to bring the unit up to the standard of a division belonging to the 32nd wave of formations.

=== 545th Volksgrenadier Division ===
In February 1945, following heavy losses at the Baranow bridgehead during the Vistula–Oder offensive, the division was disbanded, and its remnants were incorporated into the 78th Volkssturm Division. In February, the division, operating as a Kampfgruppe (combat group), was attached to the 1st Panzer Army within Army Group Centre in Upper Silesia.

=== Second formation ===
The 545th Volksgrenadier Division was reconstituted in Silesia in March 1945. Its anti-tank battalion was formed from Anti-Tank Battalion 178 of the 78th Volkssturm Division, and Grenadier Regiment 1087 was newly formed from Security Regiment Ostland 2.

In April 1945, the division, again serving as a Kampfgruppe, was attached to the 4th Panzer Army within Army Group Centre and fought in Lusatia.
At the end of the war, the remnants of the division were taken prisoner by Soviet forces near Guben.

== Commanders ==
- Major General Otto Obenaus (October 1944 - January 1945) (MIA)
- Colonel Emmanuel von Kiliani (January - February 1945)
- Major General Hans Kohlsdorfer (February - May 1945)

== Sources ==
- Samuel W. Mitcham (2007). German Order of Battle. Volume Two: 291st–999th Infantry Divisions, Named Infantry Divisions, and Special Divisions in WWII. Stackpole Books. ISBN 978-0-8117-3437-0, p. 146.
- Georg Tessin: Verbände und Truppen der deutschen Wehrmacht und Waffen-SS im Zweiten Weltkrieg 1939–1945. Volume 11. Die Landstreitkräfte 501–630. Biblio-Verlag, Bissendorf 1975, ISBN 3-7648-1181-1, p. 123.
