= Wilhelm Wetzel =

German General Second World War

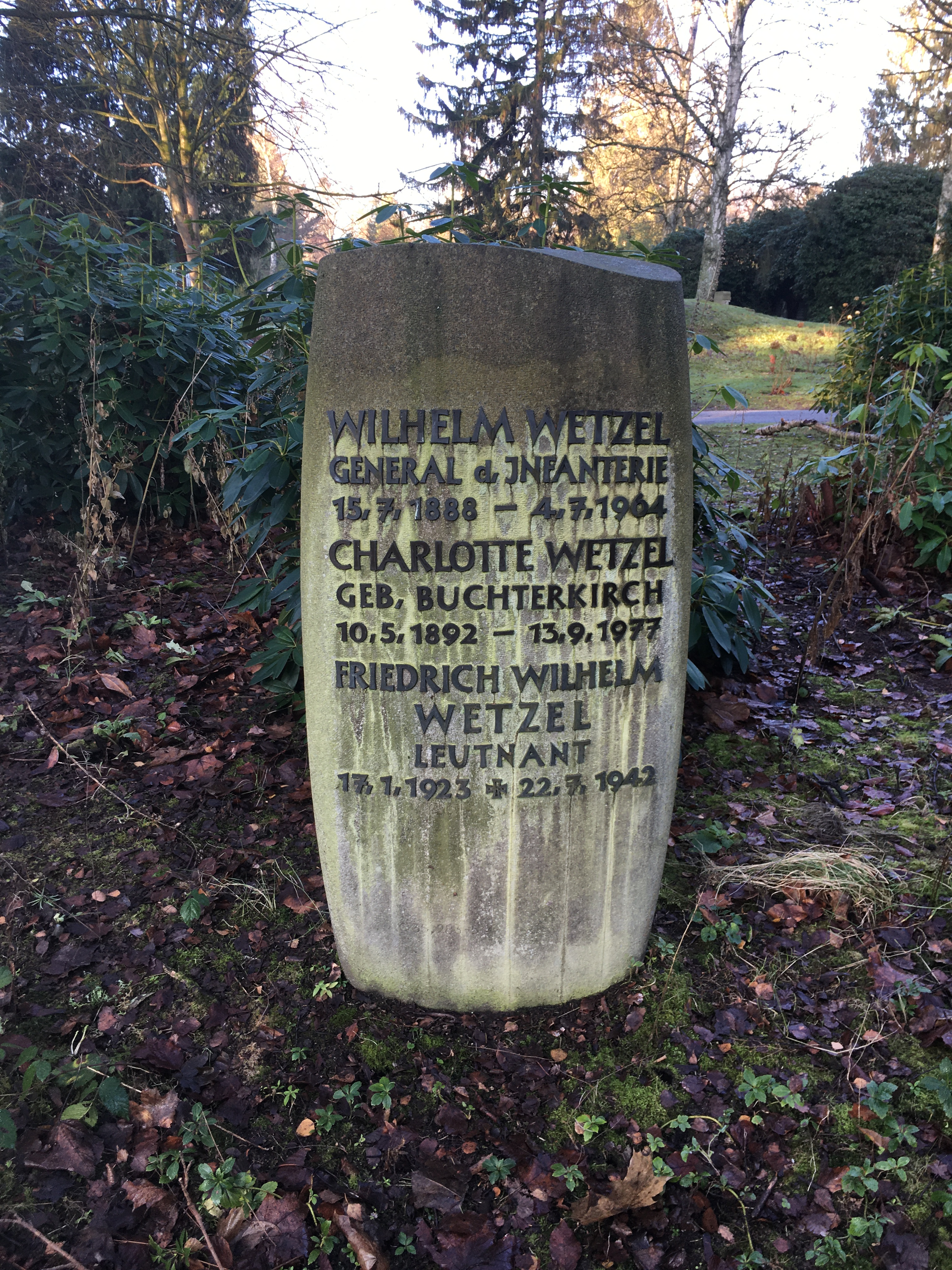
- Born: 15 July 1888; Sarbske, Kreis Lauenburg, Province of Pomerania, Kingdom of Prussia, German Empire
- Died: 4 July 1964 (aged 75); Hamburg, West Germany
- Relatives: ∞ 1920 Charlotte Buchterkirch, 1 son (19-year-old 2nd Lieutenant Friedrich Wilhelm Wetzel was † on 22 July 1942 on the Eastern Front)
- Military career
- Allegiance: Kingdom of Prussia; German Empire; Weimar Republic; Nazi Germany
- Branch: Prussian Army; Imperial German Army; Freikorps (Grenzschutz Ost); Reichsheer; German Army
- Service years: 1907–1945
- Rank: General der Infanterie
- Commands: 255th Infantry Division; V Army Corps; LXVI Army Corps
- Conflicts: World War I World War II: Battle of France; Operation Barbarossa; Battle of Białystok–Minsk; Battle of Smolensk (1941); Battle of Moscow; Battle of the Caucasus
- Awards: Knight's Cross of the Iron Cross

Friedrich Wilhelm Ludwig Wetzel (15 July 1888 – 4 July 1964) was a German officer, finally General of the Infantry in the Wehrmacht of National Socialist Germany during World War II. He was a recipient of the Knight's Cross of the Iron Cross.

== Promotions ==
- 19 February 1907 Fahnenjunker (Officer Candidate)
- 11 August 1907 Fahnenjunker-Unteroffizier (Officer Candidate with Corporal/NCO/Junior Sergeant rank)
- 18 August 1908 Leutnant (2nd Lieutenant) with Patent from 17 September 1906
- 28 November 1914 Oberleutnant (1st Lieutenant)
- 18 April 1916 Hauptmann (Captain)
- 1 February 1929 Major
- 1 July 1933 Oberstleutnant (Lieutenant Colonel)
- 1 June 1935 Oberst (Colonel)
- 30 January 1939 Generalmajor (Major General) with effect and Rank Seniority (RDA) from 1 February 1939 (2)
- 20 November 1940 Generalleutnant (Lieutenant General) with effect and RDA from 1 December 1940 (5)
- 24 January 1942 General der Infanterie (General of the Infantry) with effect from 1 February 1942 and without RDA (ernannt)
  - 28 February 1942 received RDA from 1 March 1942 (4)

== Awards and decorations ==
- Iron Cross (1914) 2nd and 1st Class
  - 2nd Class on 15 September 1914
  - 1st Class on 30 April 1915
- Hanseatic Cross of Lübeck (LübH/LüH) on 19 September 1917
- Ducal Anhalt Friedrich Cross (AF/AK) on 4 February 1918
- Wound Badge (1918) in Black on 1 June 1918
- House Order of Hohenzollern, Knight's Cross with Swords (HOH3X) on 1 September 1918
- Honour Cross of the World War 1914/1918 with Swords
- Wehrmacht Long Service Award, 4th to 1st Class on 2 October 1936
- Repetition Clasp 1939 to the Iron Cross 1914, 2nd and 1st Class
  - Clasp to EK II on 27 May 1940
  - Clasp to EK I on 1 July 1940
- German Cross in Gold on 26 December 1941
- Winter Battle in the East 1941–42 Medal on 1 August 1942
- Kuban Shield
- Romanian Order of Michael the Brave, 3rd Class on 3 March 1943
- War Victory Cross, 2nd Class with Swords
- Knight's Cross of the Iron Cross on 7 August 1942 as General der Infanterie and Commanding General of V. Armeekorps
- Loyalty Pin (Treuenadel) of the Association of German Soldiers (VdS) on 25 May 1960 for 10 years of loyal membership

Military offices
Preceded by None	Commander of 255. Infanterie-Division; 26 August 1939 – 12 January 1942	Succeeded by Generalleutnant Walter Poppe
Preceded by General der Infanterie Richard Ruoff	Commander of V. Armeekorps; 12 January 1942 – 1 July 1943	Succeeded by General der Infanterie Karl Allmendinger
Preceded by General der Infanterie Baptist Kniess	Commander of LXVI. Reservekorps; 7 September 1943 – 1 November 1943	Succeeded by General der Artillerie Walther Lucht
