= Kuban bridgehead =

1943 German military position on the Eastern Front of World War II

The Kuban Bridgehead
- Part of the Battle of the Caucasus on the Eastern Front of World War II
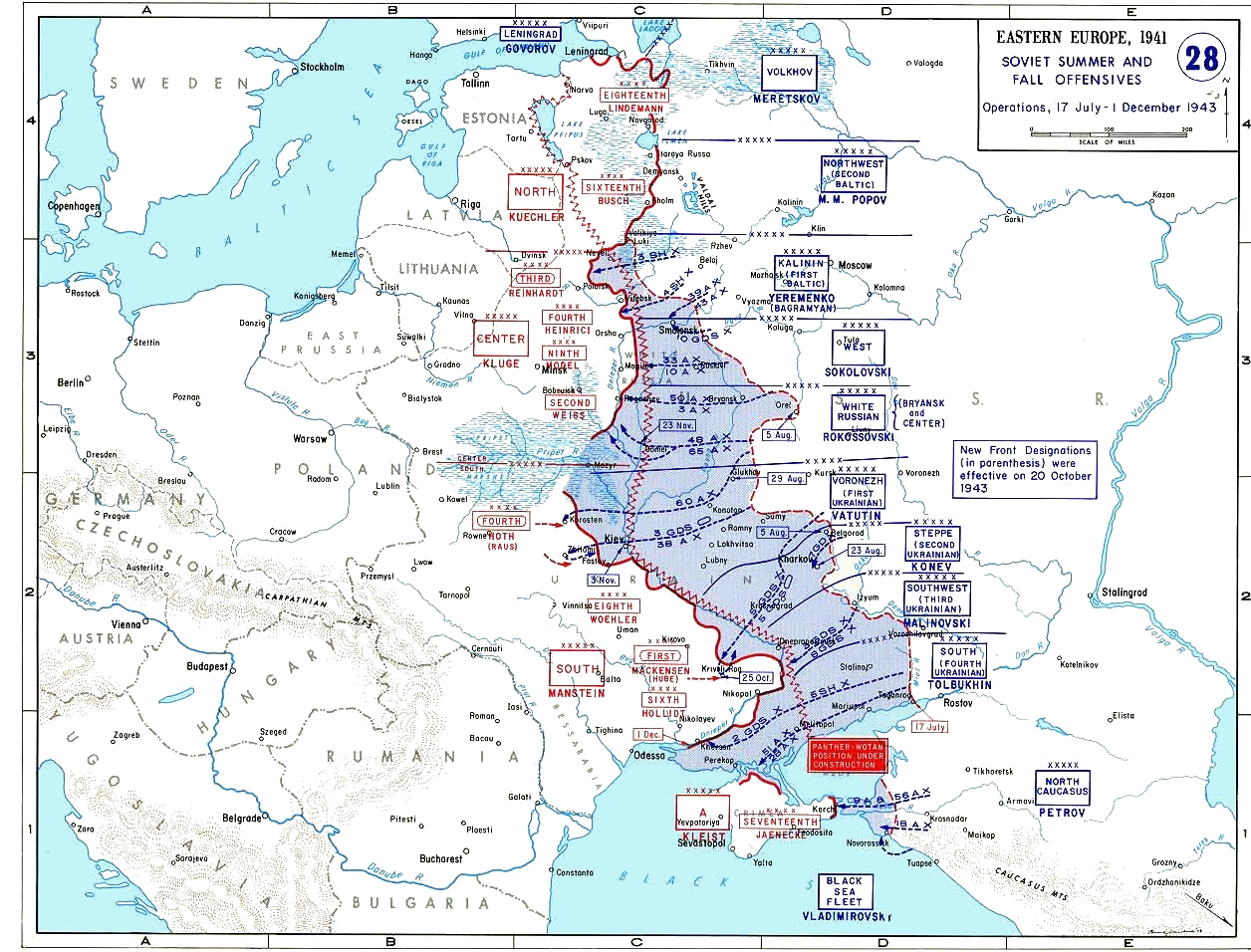
- Map of July–December 1943 positions of the Eastern Front. The Kuban Bridgehead starts by Novorossiysk
Date	1 January – 9 October 1943
Location	Taman Peninsula
Result	Axis withdrawal to Crimea in October 1943

Belligerents
Germany; Romania (Slovak Republic (1939–1945)) Slovakia	Soviet Union

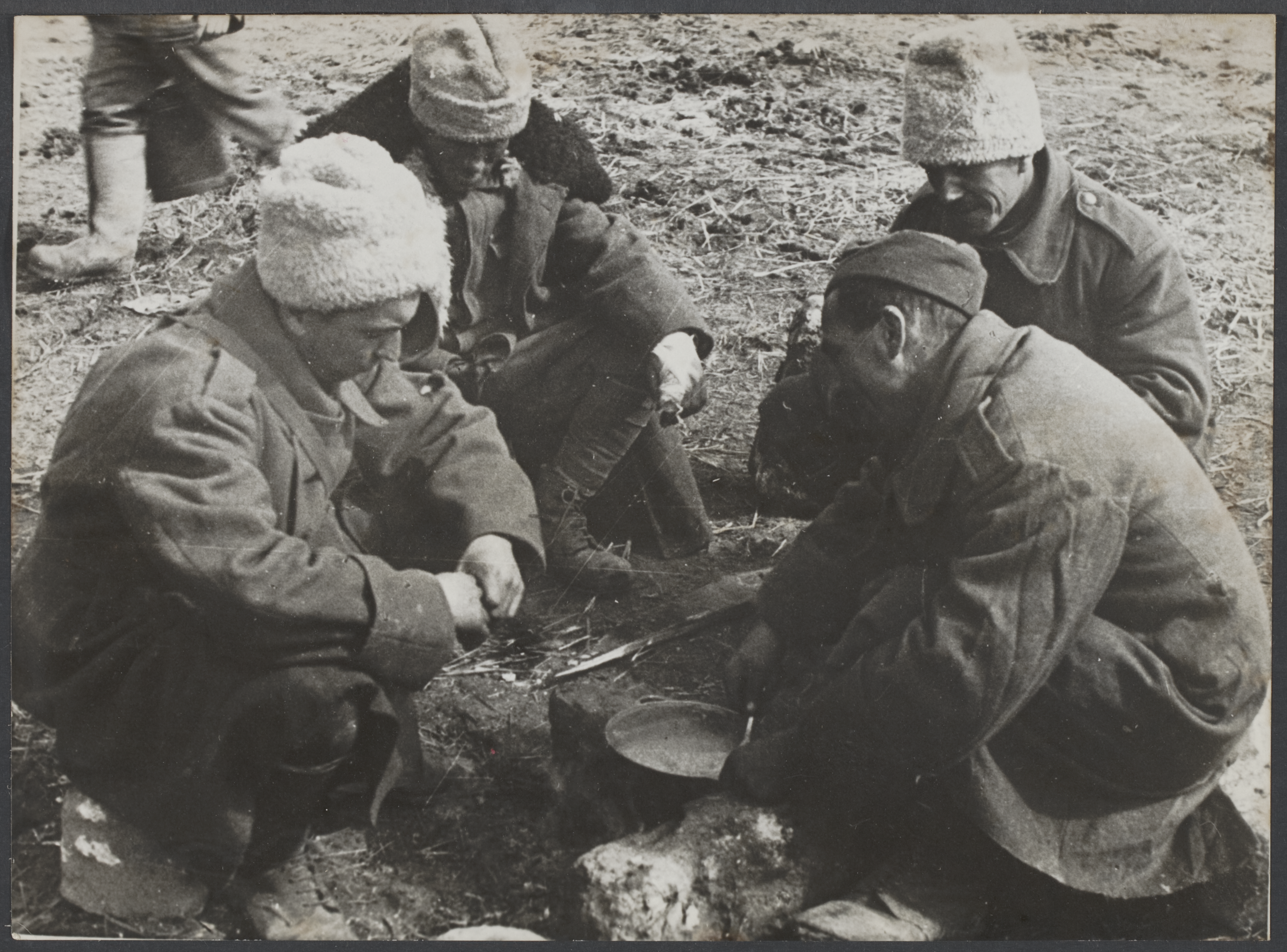
Romanian soldiers at the Kuban bridgehead making coffee, 25 May 1943.

The Kuban Bridgehead (German: Kuban-Brückenkopf), also known as the "Goth's head position" (Gotenkopfstellung), was a German military position on the Taman Peninsula, Russia, between the Sea of Azov and the Black Sea. Existing from January to October 1943, the bridgehead formed after the Germans were pushed out of the Caucasus. The heavily fortified position was intended as a staging area for the Wehrmacht which was to be used to renew attacks towards the oil wells of the Caucasus. Axis positions in the bridgehead were repeatedly subjected to large Soviet offensives, but none ever comprehensively broke the Axis defensive lines. The bridgehead was abandoned when the Red Army breached the Panther–Wotan line, forcing an evacuation of the German forces across the Kerch Strait to Crimea.

== Prelude ==
Case Blue (Fall Blau), launched 28 June 1942, saw Army Group South divided into two Army Groups, Army Group A and Army Group B, the former participating in the Battle of the Caucasus. Throughout the operation the German situation, especially that of Army Group B centered on Stalingrad, began to deteriorate. As Army Group B began collapsing in the North, Army Group A quickly found itself at risk of being flanked. It was forced to abandon its task of securing the oilfields of the Caspian, and began withdrawing down the Terek River toward the Taman Peninsula.

== Bridgehead ==
Following the encirclement of the 6th Army at Stalingrad, Army Group A withdrew towards the Black Sea and Crimea. The 17th Army, commanded by Richard Ruoff and Erwin Jaenecke, constructed a defensive position across the Kuban River delta in the Taman Peninsula, which was completed in January 1943. The main, first defense line started by Novorossiysk and ran roughly northwards all the way across the peninsula. Consisting of 5 defense lines, the total depth of the defense area was up to 60 km. German forces, moving from positions along the Terek River, fully occupied the new defensive network in February 1943 while under constant attack by the Red Army. The bridgehead, originally intended to provide a staging area for future attempts to gain control of the Caspian oil fields, was re-tasked on 3 September 1943, as the German situation on the Eastern Front continued to deteriorate. The Kuban Bridgehead then served to evacuate German forces as the withdrawal of Army Group South to the Dnieper Line had become inevitable.

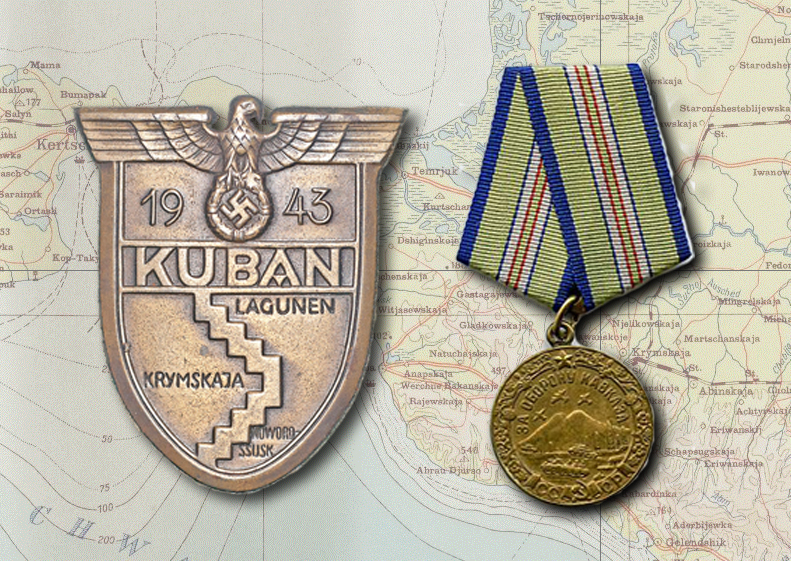
The Kuban Shield (German medal for service in the battle) and the Soviet Medal "For the Defence of the Caucasus"

The first defenses of the Kuban Bridgehead were breached on 15–16 September 1943 in the area of Novorossiysk during the Novorossiysk–Taman Operation of the Soviet North Caucasian Front. The Taman Peninsula was completely cleared of German forces on 9 October 1943.

== See also ==
- Kuban Shield — a military decoration given to Germans who fought in the Kuban bridgehead
- Kerch–Eltigen operation
- Courland Pocket
- Malaya Zemlya
- 2nd Guards Taman Motor Rifle Division
- Cross of Iron, 1977 film set in the Kuban bridgehead
- The Willing Flesh, 1955 novel set in the Kuban bridgehead
