= Karl Allmendinger =

German general (1891–1965)

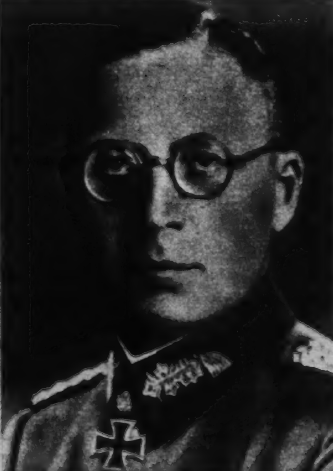
- Born: 3 February 1891; Abtsgmünd, Oberamt Aalen, Kingdom of Württemberg, German Empire
- Died: 2 October 1965 (aged 74); Ellwangen, Baden-Württemberg, West Germany
- Relatives: ∞ 1921 Irene Hundert; 2 daughters
- Military career
- Allegiance: German Empire; Weimar Republic; Nazi Germany
- Branch: Royal Württemberg Army; Imperial German Army; Reichsheer; German Army
- Service years: 1910–1945
- Rank: General der Infanterie
- Commands: 5th Infantry Division; V Army Corps; 17th Army
- Conflicts: World War I World War II
- Awards: Knight's Cross of the Iron Cross with Oak Leaves

Karl Maria Blasius Allmendinger (3 February 1891 – 2 October 1965) was a general in the Wehrmacht of Nazi Germany during World War II. He commanded the 5th Infantry Division, V Army Corps then 17th Army on the Eastern Front. He was a recipient of the Knight's Cross of the Iron Cross with Oak Leaves.

== Career ==
Allmendinger was appointed to command the 5th Infantry Division as a Generalmajor on 25 October 1940. His division was committed to the invasion of the Soviet Union in June 1941, and he was awarded the Knight's Cross of the Iron Cross on 17 July. He was promoted to Generalleutnant on 1 August 1942, and was awarded the Oak Leaves to his Knight's Cross on 13 December 1942. He was relieved of command of the division on 4 January 1943.

On 1 July 1943, he was recalled into active service and appointed commanding general of the V Army Corps which operated in the Crimea. Assigned to command the 17th Army in early May 1944, his mission was to evacuate Sevastopol and lead his units back to Romania across the Black Sea. Considerable losses in men and material were suffered.

On 25 July 1944, Allmendinger was again relieved from command and transferred to the Führerreserve, where he remained without further active assignment until the end of the war.

He was taken prisoner of war by U.S. forces on 16 May 1945 and was released on 22 December 1947.

== Family ==
Allmendinger was the son of Karl Allmendinger (1863 – 1946), a teacher, poet and writer.

== Promotions ==
- 1 October 1910 Einjährig-Freiwilliger (one-year volunteer)
- 1 April 1911 Gefreiter (Private E-2/Lance Corporal)
- 1 July 1911 Unteroffizier (NCO/Corporal/Junior Sergeant)
- 29 January 1912 Fahnenjunker (Officer Candidate)
- 22 April 1912 Fähnrich (Officer Cadet)
- 27 January 1913 Leutnant (2nd Lieutenant) with Patent from 29 January 1911
- 18 April 1916 Oberleutnant (1st Lieutenant)
  - 1 July 1922 received Reichswehr Rank Seniority (RDA) from 18 April 1916 (14)
- 25 January 1923 Hauptmann (Captain) with effect from 1 January 1923
  - 1 October 1923 renamed Rittmeister
  - 1 October 1924 renamed Hauptmann
  - 1 October 1926 renamed Rittmeister
  - 1 April 1928 renamed Hauptmann
- 1 February 1932 Major with Rank Seniority (RDA) from 1 February 1931 (25a)
- 1 July 1934 Oberstleutnant (Lieutenant Colonel) with RDA from 1 July 1934 (14)
- 2 August 1936 Oberst (Colonel) with effect and RDA from 1 August 1936 (23)
- 19 July 1940 Generalmajor (Major General) with effect and RDA from 1 August 1940 (3)
- 15 July 1942 Generalleutnant (Lieutenant General) with effect and RDA from 1 August 1942 (3)
- 10 March 1943 General der Infanterie (General of the Infantry) with effect and RDA from 1 April 1943 (2)

== Awards and decorations ==
- Iron Cross (1914), 2nd and 1st Class
  - 2nd Class on 30 September 1914
  - 1st Class on 24 November 1916
- Austrian Military Merit Cross, 3rd Class with the War Decoration (ÖM3K) on 3 July 1915
- Württemberg Military Merit Order, Knight’s Cross (WMV3/WM3) on 9 December 1916
- Friedrich Order, Knight's Cross 2nd Class with Swords (WF3bX) on 24 April 1918
- Wound Badge (1918) in Black on 22 December 1918
- Order of the Lithuanian Grand Duke Gediminas, 3rd Class (Commander's Cross) on 16 February 1928
- Honour Cross of the World War 1914/1918 with Swords on 18 January 1935
- Wehrmacht Long Service Award, 4th to 1st Class (25-year Service Cross) on 2 October 1936
- Repetition Clasp 1939 to the Iron Cross 1914, 2nd and 1st Class
  - 2nd Class on 20 September 1939
  - 1st Class on 21 May 1940
- Winter Battle in the East 1941–42 Medal on 27 July 1942
- Order of the Cross of Liberty, 1st Class with Swords on 29 March 1943
- Order of Michael the Brave, 3rd Class on 12 July 1944
- Knight's Cross of the Iron Cross with Oak Leaves
  - Knight's Cross on 17 July 1941 as Generalmajor and Commander of the 5. Infanterie-Division
  - 153rd Oak Leaves on 13 December 1942 as Generalleutnant and Commander of the 5. Jäger-Division

Military offices
Preceded by General Wilhelm Fahrmbacher	Commander of 5th Infantry Division; 25 October 1940 – June 1942	Succeeded by Oberst Walter Jost
Preceded by Oberst Walter Jost	Commander of 5th Jäger Division; July 1942 – 4 January 1943	Succeeded by General der Infanterie Helmut Thumm
Preceded by General der Infanterie Wilhelm Wetzel	Commander of V Army Corps; 1 July 1943 – 1 May 1944	Succeeded by Generalleutnant Hermann Böhme
Preceded by Generaloberst Erwin Jaenecke	Commander of 17th Army; 1 May 1944 – 25 July 1944	Succeeded by General der Infanterie Friedrich Schulz
