= Walter Weiß =

German general (1890-1967)

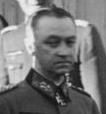
- Born: 5 September 1890; Tilsit, Province of East Prussia, Kingdom of Prussia, German Empire
- Died: 21 December 1967 (aged 77); Aschaffenburg, Bavaria, West Germany
- Military career
- Allegiance: German Empire; Weimar Republic; Nazi Germany
- Branch: German Army
- Service years: 1908–1945
- Rank: Generaloberst
- Commands: 26 Infantry Division; XXVII Army Corps; 2nd Army; Army Group North
- Conflicts: World War I World War II
- Awards: Knight's Cross of the Iron Cross with Oak Leaves

Walter Weiß, also spelt Weiss (5 September 1890 – 21 December 1967), was a German general during World War II. In 1945 he became commander in chief of Army Group North on the Eastern Front. He was a recipient of the Knight's Cross of the Iron Cross with Oak Leaves.

== Career ==
Weiss was born in Tilsit, East Prussia and joined the Army on 19 March 1908.

At the beginning of the Second World War, during the Polish Campaign, he was given command of I. Army Corps, holding the position chief of the general staff on 1 September.

On 15 December 1940 he took command of the 97th Jäger Division, leading the division with the rank of major-general until 15 January 1941.

On 15 January 1941 command of the 26th Infantry Division. This Division was subordinated to Army Group Centre and participated in Operation Barbarossa.

Weiss took command of the XXVII Army Corps on 1 July 1942. Weiss led the 2nd Army on the Eastern Front from 3 February 1943 on. From 27 July to 5 August 1944, this involved leading the 2nd Army's defence and withdrawal battles during the Russian summer offensive Operation Bagration between the Pripyat and Bug River, including the evacuation of Brest-Litovsk on 28 July 1944.

In January 1945, he asked Adolf Hitler for permission to withdraw his forces further west as a result of attacking forces under the leadership of Konstantin Rokossovsky having reached the Vistula Lagoon. Hitler denied the request. He also requested to withdraw his forces from the town of Grudziądz but was denied permission by Reichsführer Heinrich Himmler, resulting in a significant battle that destroyed much of the town.

He received command of Army Group North on 12 March 1945 and was tasked with the defence of Gdańsk Bay which his forces were unable to achieve. He later surrendered the Army Group to the American forces.

He died 21 December 1967.

== Awards ==
- Iron Cross (1914) 2nd Class (9 September 1914) & 1st Class (15 December 1915)
- Clasp to the Iron Cross (1939) 2nd Class (19 September 1939) & 1st Class (2 October 1939)
- German Cross in Gold on 19 February 1943 as General der Infanterie and commanding general of the XXVII. Armeekorps
- Knight's Cross of the Iron Cross with Oak Leaves
  - Knight's Cross on 12 September 1941 as Generalmajor and commander of the 26.Infanterie-Division
  - Oak Leaves on 5 November 1944 as Generaloberst and Commander-in-Chief of the 2. Armee

Military offices
Preceded by None	Commander of 97. leichte-Division; 15 December 1940 – January 15, 1941	Succeeded by General der Infanterie Sigismund von Förster
Preceded by General der Infanterie Sigismund von Forster	Commander of 26. Infanterie-Division; 15 January 1941 – 15 April 1942	Succeeded by General der Infanterie Friedrich Wiese
Preceded by General Hans von Salmuth	Commander of 2. Armee; 4 February 1943 – 9 March 1945	Succeeded by General Dietrich von Saucken
Preceded by Generaloberst Dr. Lothar Rendulic	Commander of Heeresgruppe Nord; 12 March 1945 – 2 April 1945	Succeeded by none
