= 2nd Army (Wehrmacht) =

- German: 2. Armee
- Insignia
- Active: August 1939; October 1939 – April 1945
- Country: Nazi Germany
- Branch: German army ( Wehrmacht)
- Type: Field army
- Engagements: Battle of France; Eastern Front

Commanders
- Notable commanders: Fedor von Bock; Maximilian von Weichs; Rudolf Schmidt; Hans von Salmuth; Walter Weiß

The 2nd Army (German: 2. Armee) was a field army of the German Army during World War II.

== History ==
=== 1939–1941 ===
The 2nd Army headquarters was briefly established in Berlin from Group Command 1 on 26 August 1939 and at the beginning of the Invasion of Poland it was renamed Army Group North on 2 September.

The 2nd Army was reestablished on 20 October 1939, with Generaloberst Maximilian von Weichs in command, by renaming the 8th Army, which had been moved from Poland to the west. After the beginning of the Battle of France the army was assigned to Army Group A in June 1940, when it fought across the Aisne and around Reims. In April 1941, the army was involved in the invasion of the Balkans, capturing Belgrade in a rapid offensive.

=== 1941–1945 ===
From 1941 until the end of the war the army was deployed in the Eastern Front, starting with the Operation Barbarossa as part of Army Group Centre. It advanced from Białystok to Mogilev, Gomel, Chernigov, Bryansk successively and defended against Soviet counterattack near Kursk. In 1942 the 2nd Army covered the northern wing of Case Blue operating in the surroundings of Voronezh under Army Group B. With Hans von Salmuth as the commander, it suffered a major defeat during the Voronezh-Kastornensk operation, the Soviet winter offensive that followed the battle of Stalingrad. On 4 February 1943 Walter Weiß replaced von Salmuth as commander.

General der Panzertruppe Dietrich von Saucken became commander of the army on 10 March 1945. The army was renamed Army East Prussia (AOK Ostpreußen) on 7 April and was pivotal in the defence of East and West Prussia before end of World War II in Europe on 9 May 1945.

=== Commanders ===
No.	Portrait	Commander	Took office	Left office	Time in office
1	Fedor von Bock	Generaloberst; Fedor von Bock (1880–1945)	26 August 1939	2 September 1939	7 days
2	Maximilian von Weichs	Generaloberst; Maximilian von Weichs (1881–1954)	20 October 1939	15 November 1941	2 years, 26 days
3	Rudolf Schmidt	General der Panzertruppe; Rudolf Schmidt (1886–1957)	15 November 1941	15 January 1942	61 days
(2)	Maximilian von Weichs	Generaloberst; Maximilian von Weichs (1881–1954)	15 January 1942	14 July 1942	180 days
4	Hans von Salmuth	Generaloberst; Hans von Salmuth (1888–1962)	15 July 1942	3 February 1943	203 days
5	Walter Weiß	Generaloberst; Walter Weiß (1890–1967)	4 February 1943	9 March 1945	2 years, 33 days
6	Dietrich von Saucken	General der Panzertruppe; Dietrich von Saucken (1892–1980)	10 March 1945	7 April 1945	28 days

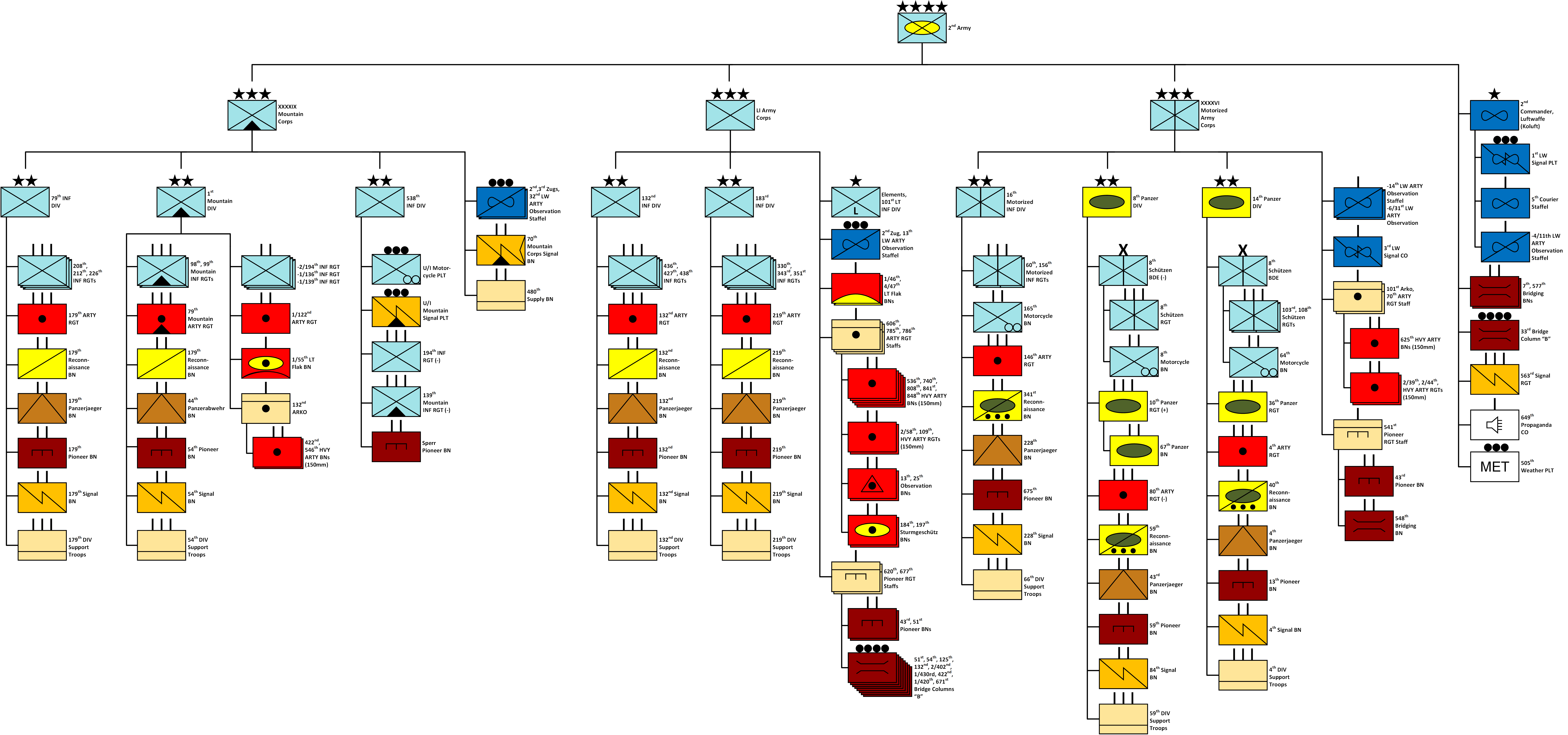
Organization of 2nd Army during operations in the Balkans

== See also ==
- 2nd Army (German Empire) for the equivalent formation in World War I
