= Erwin Jaenecke =

German general (1890–1960)

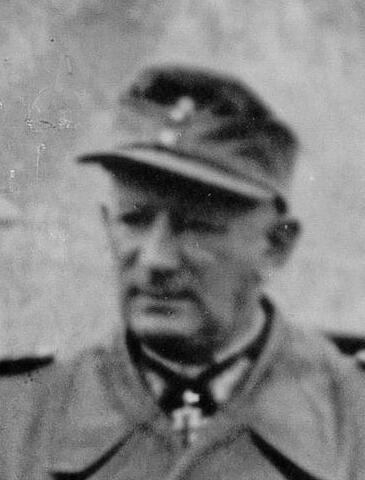
- Jaenecke in January 1944
- Born: 22 April 1890; Freren, German Empire
- Died: 3 July 1960 (aged 70); Cologne, West Germany
- Military career
- Allegiance: German Empire; Weimar Republic; Nazi Germany
- Branch: German Army
- Service years: 1911–1945
- Rank: Generaloberst
- Commands: IV Army Corps; 17th Army
- Conflicts: World War I Spanish Civil War; World War II
- Awards: Knight's Cross of the Iron Cross; Order of Michael the Brave

Erwin Jaenecke (22 April 1890 – 3 July 1960), was a general in the Wehrmacht of Nazi Germany during World War II who commanded the 17th Army.

== Biography ==
Jaenecke fought in the Spanish Civil War as part of the Condor Legion On 26 April 1937, Jaenecke was involved in the Bombing of Guernica. After the bombing, he reported the operation as a success.

"In and of itself, Guernica was a complete success for the Luftwaffe."

Jaenecke served on the Eastern Front as commander of the 389th Infantry Division and later the IV Army Corps. He was wounded at the Battle of Stalingrad and flown out as one of the last higher officers.

In April 1943 he commanded the LXXXII Army Corps, and from 25 June the 17th Army in the Caucasus and later the Crimean Peninsula. In a 29 April 1944 meeting with Adolf Hitler in Berchtesgaden, Jaenecke insisted that Sevastopol should be evacuated. He was relieved of his command afterward.

Later, he was held responsible for the loss of Crimea, arrested in Romania and court-martialed. Heinz Guderian was appointed as a special investigator in the case. Guderian proceeded slowly and eventually Jaenecke was quietly acquitted in June 1944. Jaenecke was dismissed from the army on 31 January 1945. On 15 June 1945 he was arrested by the Soviet authorities and sentenced to 25 years of hard labor for war crimes committed under his army command in 1942. He was released in 1955.

== Awards ==
- Knight's Cross of the Iron Cross on 9 October 1942

Military offices
Preceded by —	Commander of 389. Infanterie-Division; 1 February 1942 – 1 November 1942	Succeeded by Generalmajor Erich Magnus
Preceded by General der Infanterie Viktor von Schwedler	Commander of IV. Armeekorps; 1 November 1942 - 17 January 1943	Succeeded by General der Artillerie Max Pfeffer
Preceded by General der Infanterie Ernst Dehner	Commander of LXXXII. Armeekorps; 1 April 1943 - 1 June 1943	Succeeded by General der Infanterie Ernst Dehner
Preceded by Richard Ruoff	Commander of 17. Armee; 25 June 1943 – 1 March 1944	Succeeded by Ferdinand Schörner
Preceded by Ferdinand Schörner	Commander of 17. Armee; 1 April 1944 – 28 April 1944	Succeeded by Karl Allmendinger
