= Bodewin Keitel =

German general (1888–1953)

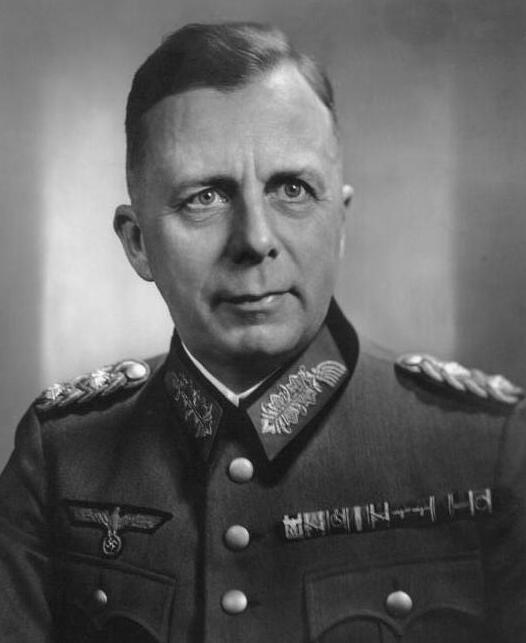

Chief of the Army Personnel Office
- In office 4 February 1938 – 1 October 1942
- Preceded by: Viktor von Schwedler
- Succeeded by: Rudolf Schmundt

Personal details
- Born: Bodewin Claus Eduard Keitel; 25 December 1888 Estate Helmscherode, Kreis Gandersheim, Duchy of Brunswick, German Empire
- Died: 29 July 1953 (aged 64) Göttingen, Lower Saxony, West Germany
- Spouse(s): ∞ 1916 Karla Marie Ilse Roth; 3 children
- Relatives: Wilhelm Keitel (brother)

Military service
- Allegiance: Kingdom of Prussia; German Empire; Weimar Republic; Nazi Germany
- Branch/service: Prussian Army; Imperial German Army; Reichsheer; German Army
- Years of service: 1909–1945
- Rank: General der Infanterie
- Battles/wars: World War I World War II

Bodewin Claus Eduard Keitel (German pronunciation: [ˈboːdəvɪn ˈkaɪtl̩]; 25 December 1888 – 29 July 1953) was a German general during World War II who served as head of the Army Personnel Office.

== Life ==
=== Pre-war career ===
Bodewin Keitel was born on 25 December 1888 in Helmscherode, the son of a landowner (Gut Helmscherode). He was the brother of Wilhelm Keitel, later a Generalfeldmarschall and head of the Wehrmacht High Command. Bodewin joined the army in 1909 and served during World War I.

After the end of World War I, he was retained in the Reichswehr, eventually reaching the rank of colonel. In 1937, he was appointed as the Chief of Training Department ("T4") and was added in the General Staff of the Army.

On 28 February 1938, he was promoted to Generalmajor (major general) and appointed head of the Army Personnel Office. He held this position until 1 October 1942.

=== World War II ===
On 1 April 1940, Keitel received his promotion to Generalleutnant (lieutenant general) and one year later the General of Infantry (general of infantry). In the period from 1 October 1942 to 28 February 1943, he was granted leave to "restore health". His successor in the Army Personnel Office was Rudolf Schmundt.

On 1 March 1943, Keitel was appointed commanding general of the Deputy Commanding General XX Army Corps and commander in the military district XX in Danzig.

The liaison officer in the military district XX at the time was Lieutenant Colonel Hasso von Boehmer, who by his friend Henning von Tresckow for his resistance to Adolf Hitler, recruited the brothers Stauffenberg to carry out the assassination of Hitler. On the day of the assassination attempt on Adolf Hitler (20 July 1944) Keitel was on an inspection tour in his command area.

As first general staff officer, Keitel took Boehmer from the Berlin Bendlerblock and a telegram to Keitel from the conspirators and prompted the first steps. Keitel then heard over the radio that the attack had failed and he returned immediately to Danzig. He confirmed by a telephone call to his brother Wilhelm Keitel that Hitler was alive. Boehmer was taken before the People's Court and executed in 1945.

On 1 December 1944, Bodewin Keitel was moved into the Führerreserve of the Army High Command (OKH). On 3 May 1945, he became a U.S. prisoner of war, then dismissed on 17 April 1947.

== Awards and decorations ==
- Iron Cross (1914), 2nd and 1st Class
  - 2nd Class on 17 September 1914
  - 1st Class on 5 November 1916
- Saxon Albert Order, Knight 2nd Class with Swords (SA3bX) on 14 January 1915
- War Merit Cross (Brunswick), 2nd and 1st Class
  - 2nd Class (BrK2) on 24 March 1915
    - Frontline Service Horse Clasp on the ribbon (Bewährungsabzeichen auf dem Band; BrK2a)
  - 1st Class (BrK1) on 1 July 1918
- Hamburg Hanseatic Cross (HH) on 12 July 1918
- Honour Cross of the World War 1914/1918 with Swords on 18 January 1935
- Wehrmacht Long Service Award, 4th to 1st Class on 2 October 1936
- German Red Cross Decoration, 1st Class (neck order with golden oak leaves) on 5 September 1938
- Hungarian Order of Merit, Commander's Cross with Star on 26 September 1938
- Anschluss Medal on 21 November 1938
- Order of the Yugoslav Crown, 2nd Class on 1 June 1939
- Sudetenland Medal with the “Prague Castle” clasp on 10 July 1939
- Repetition Clasp 1939 to the Iron Cross 1914, 2nd and 1st Class
- Imperial Order of the Yoke and Arrows, Encomienda con Placa No. 99 (Grand Commander / Grand Officer with star/plaque) on 20 January 1941
- Finnish Order of the Cross of Liberty, 1st Class with Oakleaves and Swords on 25 March 1942
- German Cross in Silver on 2 October 1942 as General der Infanterie and Chief of the Heerespersonalamt

== Sources ==
- German Federal Archives: BArch PERS 6/215 and PERS 6/299972

== Literature ==
- Deutsches Geschlechterbuch. Band 102. Görlitz 1938.
- Hans-Joachim Keitel: Geschichte der Familie Keitel. Hannover 1989.
- Dieter Lent: Keitel, Bodewin. In: Horst-Rüdiger Jarck, Günter Scheel (Hrsg.): Braunschweigisches Biographisches Lexikon: 19. und 20. Jahrhundert. Hahnsche Buchhandlung, Hannover 1996, ISBN 3-7752-5838-8, S. 315.
