= Erik von Amsberg =

Erik von Amsberg (October 21, 1908 – 1980) was a German Army colonel, serving as Adolf Hitler's aide for the Wehrmacht from July to October 1944, as temporary replacement of Gen. Rudolf Schmundt.
