= Erich von Tschischwitz =

German World War I general (1870–1958)

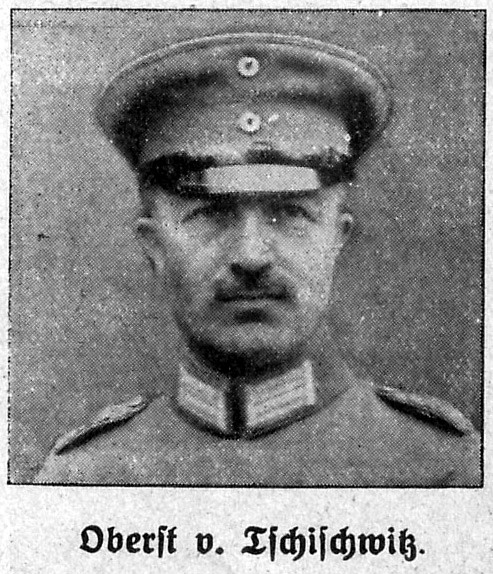
- Born: 17 May 1870; Kulm, West Prussia, Prussia, Germany
- Died: 26 September 1958 (aged 88); Berlin, West Berlin, West Germany
- Spouse: Margarete von Steinbach (m. 1902)
- Military career
- Allegiance: German Empire; Weimar Republic
- Branch: Imperial German Army; Reichsheer
- Service years: 1889 – 1929
- Rank: General of the Infantry
- Conflicts: World War I: German spring offensive

Wilhelm Ludwig Erich Felix von Tschischwitz was a German General of the Infantry who participated in World War I. He was part of the Imperial German General Staff during the German spring offensive as well as commanding the Reichswehr after the war concluded.

== Early career ==
After completing his cadet training, Tschischwitz joined the Grenadier Regiment "Graf Kleist von Nollendorf" (1st West Prussian) No. 6 of the Imperial German Army on 22 March 1889, as a second lieutenant. Tschischwitz was stationed at the cadet house at Bensberg from 1882 to 1885 before being transferred to the main institution at Lichterfelde. He was promoted to first lieutenant on 1 September 1896, and on 22 March 1902, promoted to captain. On 9 October 1902 he married Margarete von Steinbach and on 1 October 1904 he commanded the XV Corps at Strasbourg. On 1 April 1905 he returned to the General Staff and on 1 April 1906 he was appointed chief of the 1st company of the 4th Thuringian Infantry Regiment No. 72 in Torgau. On 1 October 1907 he returned to the General Staff and simultaneously with his promotion to Major, on 10 September 1908, he took over as commander of the II Battalion in the 4th Silesian Infantry Regiment No. 157 in Brieg.

== World War I ==
With the outbreak of the World War I and the German mobilization, he came with his regiment to the front, was promoted to lieutenant colonel on 19 August 1914, and at the end of October 1914 as a part of the chief of staff of the XXIII Reserve Corps. He became a colonel on 17 April 1917. On 9 November 1917, he was awarded the Pour le Mérite. From 23 February 1918 he was Chief of the General Staff of the 2nd Army and from 16 July 1918 Commander of the 172nd Infantry Brigade. On 23 March 1918, he was awarded the oak leaves to his Pour le Mérite for his service at Oesel.`

== Commander of the Reichswehr ==
After the end of the war he was taken over by the Reichswehr and initially held the position of Inspector of Verkehrstruppen in the Reichswehr Ministry in Berlin. He was promoted to Major General on 1 April 1920. On 1 February 1923 he was appointed commander of the 2nd Division in Stettin and he was also commander of the Wehrkreis II. On 1 April 1923 he was promoted to lieutenant general. On 1 February 1927 he was transferred back to Berlin and took over as commander-in-chief of the group command1 and on 1 November 1927 he was promoted to General of the Infantry. On 31 March 1929 he was honorably discharged from service and retired.

== Later life ==
Already during his active service, he worked as an author and co-author of numerous books on World War I.

In 1945 his two sons-in-law were shot: on 2 February Lieutenant General Gustav Heisterman von Ziehlberg "for disobedience in the field" due to cooperation with Ludwig Beck, who was involved in the 20 July plot, and on 22 April Major General Reinhold Gothsche because he had expressed doubts about the Endsieg.

== Awards ==
- Iron Cross
  - I Class (1914)
  - II Class (1914)
- Order of the Red Eagle, IV Class with crown
- Order of the Crown, 2nd Class with swords
- House Order of Hohenzollern, Knight's Cross with swords
- Dienstauszeichnung
- Military Merit Order with swords
- Albert Order with swords
- Friedrich Order, II class with swords
- Hanseatic Cross
  - Hamburg Cross
  - Lübeck Cross
- Military Merit Cross, II Class
- Pour le Mérite with Oak Leaves
  - Pour le Mérite on 9 November 1917
  - Oak Leaves on 23 March 1918

=== Foreign Awards ===
- Austria-Hungary: Order of the Iron Crown
- Austria-Hungary: Military Merit Cross
