= Erich Weber =

German general (1860–1933)

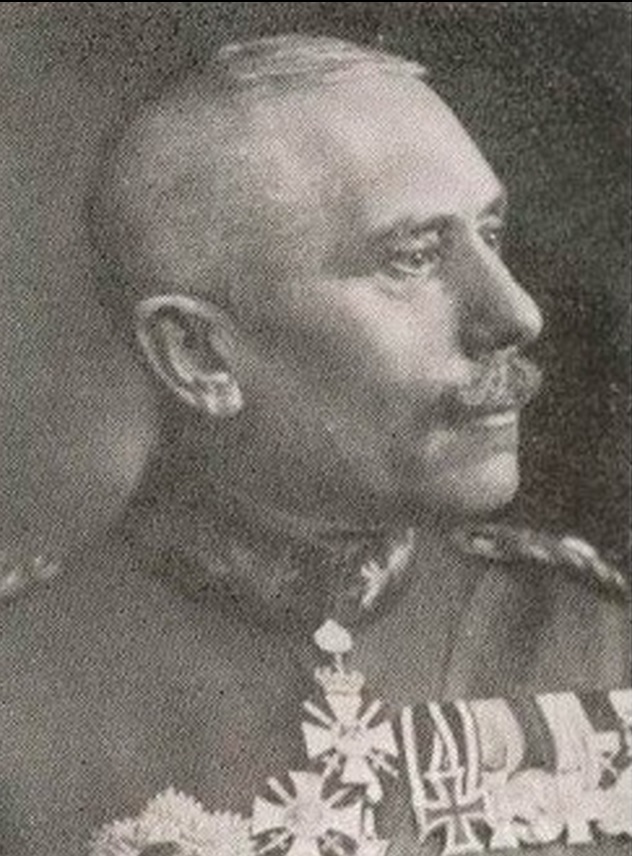
- Born: September 12, 1860
- Died: October 29, 1933 (aged 73)
- Military career
- Allegiance: German Empire: Kingdom of Prussia; Ottoman Empire; Germany
- Branch: Imperial German Army: Prussian Army; Ottoman Army; Reichsheer
- Service years: 1878–1913, 1915–1921 (Germany); 1913–1915 (Ottoman)
- Rank: General of the Infantry (Germany); Major General (Ottoman)
- Commands: XV Corps (Ottoman Empire); 100th Infantry Brigade; 9th Division
- Conflicts: World War I: Middle Eastern theater; Gallipoli campaign; Western Front

Erich Paul Weber (born 12 September 1860 in Kamen; died 29 October 1933 in Berlin) was a German army officer, who served in both the German Imperial Army and the Ottoman Army during World War I, and ultimately attained the rank of General of Infantry (General der Infanterie).

== Military career ==
Weber entered the Prussian Army and received his commission as Sekondeleutnant on 15 April 1878. A successful career as a junior regimental officer culminated in his command of the Schleswig-Holsteinische Pionier-Bataillon Nr. 9, headquartered in Harburg. On 14 April 1907, with the rank of Major, he was transferred to Engineer Inspectorate (Ingenieur-Inspektion) IV, where he served as an engineer officer in the Metz Fortification Command (Festung Metz). On 22 March 1910 he was promoted to Oberstleutnant. His transfer to Strasbourg on 22 May 1912 followed his appointment as commanding officer of the Pioneers of the XV Corps. In this position he wore the uniform of the 1. Elsässische Pionier-Bataillon Nr. 15. On 19 November 1912 he was promoted to Oberst.

On 3 December 1913 Weber was selected to participate in the newly inaugurated German Military Mission (Militärmission) to the Ottoman Empire, headed by Liman von Sanders. On 8 December Weber was formally granted retirement from active service in the German Imperial Army prior to his transfer to the Ottoman Army, and he was among the first contingent of 10 German officers to arrive in Istanbul later that month. He was initially appointed Inspector-General of Engineers (İstihkam Müfettişi) attached to the Ottoman Ministry of War, with the higher Ottoman rank of Mirliva (= German Generalmajor). As a specialist in fortifications, when the Ottoman Empire began preparing to enter World War I, Weber was assigned to strengthen the coastal defences of the Dardanelles. In late March/April 1915 he was appointed commander of the Ottoman XV Corps on the Asian shore of the Straits. During the Gallipoli Campaign, he distinguished himself in the early stages of the fighting on the Asian side of the Dardanelles. On 18 April 1915 he was promoted to the German rank of Generalmajor and thus automatically attained the higher Ottoman rank of Ferik (= German Generalleutnant), along with the honorific Ottoman title of Pasha. On 5 May Weber was appointed commander of South Group, on the southern part of the Gallipoli peninsula, during a phase of heavy fighting in this sector. Following criticism of his performance, however, Weber quarreled with Liman von Sanders and was relieved of this command on 8 July.

In October 1915 Weber returned to Germany. Formally reinstated in the German Imperial Army, from 22 October to 16 November 1915 he served on the Western Front as commanding officer of 100th Infantry Brigade. On 21 December 1916 he assumed command of 9th Division on the Western Front and remained in this post until the Armistice in 1918.

Following the end of the war, Weber was absorbed into the Provisional Reichswehr (Vorläufige Reichswehr). On 16 June 1920 he was promoted to Generalleutnant and appointed commander of Military District (Wehrkreis) II. After the formation of the Reichswehr, on 1 October 1920 he was appointed commanding officer of the 2nd Division, based in Stettin. On 15 June 1921 he retired from the Reichswehr with the brevet rank of General der Infanterie.

Weber's daughter Ingeborg married the later High Admiral Karl Dönitz in 1916.

The Bundeswehr barracks in Höxter are named after Weber.
