= Carlshof Institutions =

Carlshof Institutions Carlshöfer Anstalten
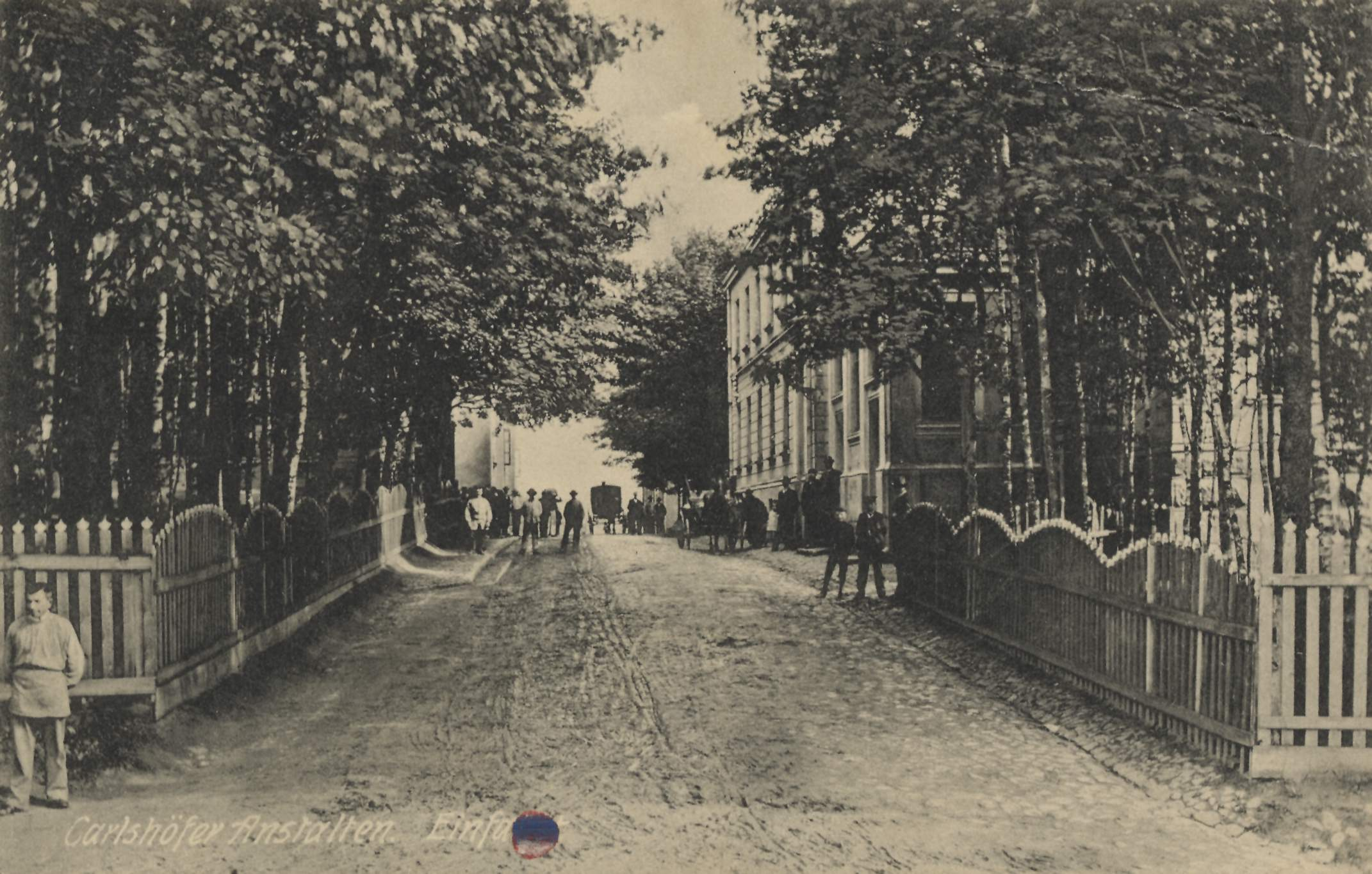
- Carlshöfer Anstalten about 1914

- Location on a map of interwar Germany Carlshof Institutions (Poland)

Geography
- Location: Carlshof, East Prussia (Karolewo, Poland)
- Coordinates: 54.0741°N 21.4218°E

Services
- Beds: 36 (1882); 554 (1898); 1500 (1914); 799 (1928); 900 (1939)

History
- Founded: October 1882 (1883)
- Closed: 1940 (1945 as military hospital)

The Carlshof Institutions (German: Carlshöfer Anstalten) was a diaconal hospital in Carlshof, East Prussia (Karolewo, Poland). Founded in 1882, it was located about 3 km (1.9 mi) east of the town center of Rastenburg (Kętrzyn). Carlshof housed up to 1,500 inmates from all over East Prussia and specialized in treating patients with epilepsy and intellectual disability; it also cared for alcoholics, elderly, and juveniles as well as homeless persons. In World War II, Carlshof served as a military hospital and barracks for Hitler's nearby headquarters at the Wolf's Lair (German: Wolfsschanze).

== History ==
=== Diaconal Institutions ===
After the Tapiau (Gvardeysk) infirmary (German: Provinzial-Armen und Siechenhaus Tapiau) released 200 patients for the lack of housing capacity in 1881, the Superintendent of Rastenburg, Christian Klapp (1832-1905), initiated a support program and bought the estate of Carlshof near Rastenburg. On 4 November 1881 the Lutheran provincial synod decided to support the project and in October 1882 (or 1883) the first 36 epileptic patients were accommodated in Carlshof. Thirty of them initially originated from East and West Prussia and returned from the Bethel Foundation near Bielefeld. Bethel and the concept of Inner Mission remained the role model of the Carlshof Institutions.

In 1884, accommodations for up to 150 homeless were built, and in 1890, an asylum for alcoholics was added. In 1905, a reformatory for 80 adolescents was added. In 1898, the Carlshof Institutions housed 554 patients. A tuberculosis ward and quarters for the educations of deacons of the Inner Mission completed the Diaconal Institutions.

At the start of World War I, Carlshof consisted of 500 hectares (1,200 acres) acreage in agricultural use for occupational therapy and housed 1,500 patients. Carlshof was partially damaged in August 1914 and occupied by Russian troops until early September 1914, the harvest was largely destroyed by a fire. After World War I, Carlshof did not return to the former importance and numbers of patients. As of 1928, Carlshof held a capacity of 850 beds and housed 799 patients.

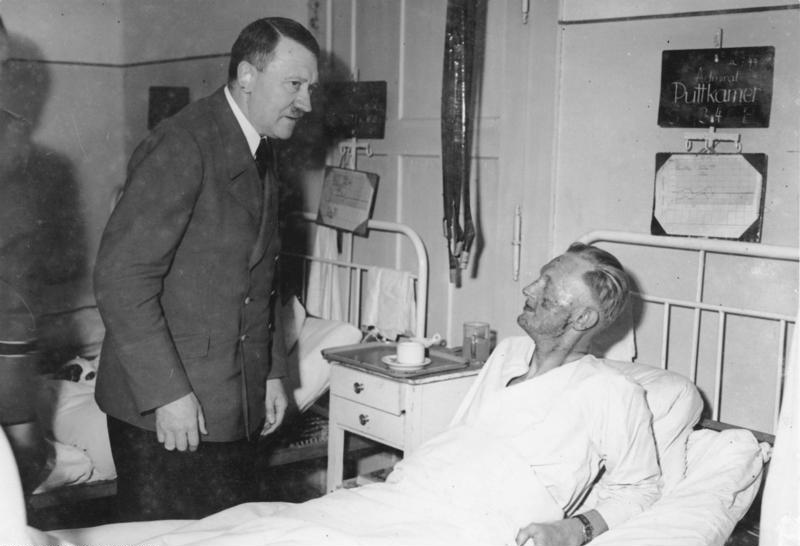
Hitler and Karl-Jesko von Puttkamer in the Carlshof military hospital

Following the Nazi takeover in 1933, 53 patients of Carlshof – 35 female and 18 male – were victims of compulsory sterilization based on the Law for the Prevention of Hereditarily Diseased Offspring executed in the municipal hospital of Rastenburg. In 1934, the outlying estate of Wilhelmsdorf (Wilamowo) had to be sold on political compulsion and was used for the construction of Rastenburg airfield. The National Socialist People's Welfare (NSV) and the East Prussian provincial government tried to expand their influence on Carlshof, especially Gauleiter Erich Koch aimed at a repression of confessionally operated institutions. From 1937 on, Erich Koch initiated the increased transfer of mentally ill to Carlshof, which had been largely specialized on epilepsy before. In 1938, the Gestapo started a criminal investigation against the director, Heinz Dembowski, and several members of the staff accusing them of "anti-state behaviour". In a board-meeting of the Carlshof Diaconal Institutions in March 1939, Dembowski was supposed to be replaced by a director closely associated with the NSV. The attempt failed, and Dembowski was finally ousted by a Gestapo decree, Carlshof was expropriated to the benefit of the East Prussian provincial government. 900 patients were sent to other psychiatric hospitals across East Prussia, 66 of them were deported to Soldau concentration camp between 21 and 31 May 1940 and murdered in a group of 1,558 inmates of East Prussian psychiatric hospitals. Many of the remaining patients were most likely killed in the Aktion T4 as 2/3 of all inmates of East Prussian psychiatric hospitals died between 1940 and 1942.

=== Wolfsschanze hospital ===
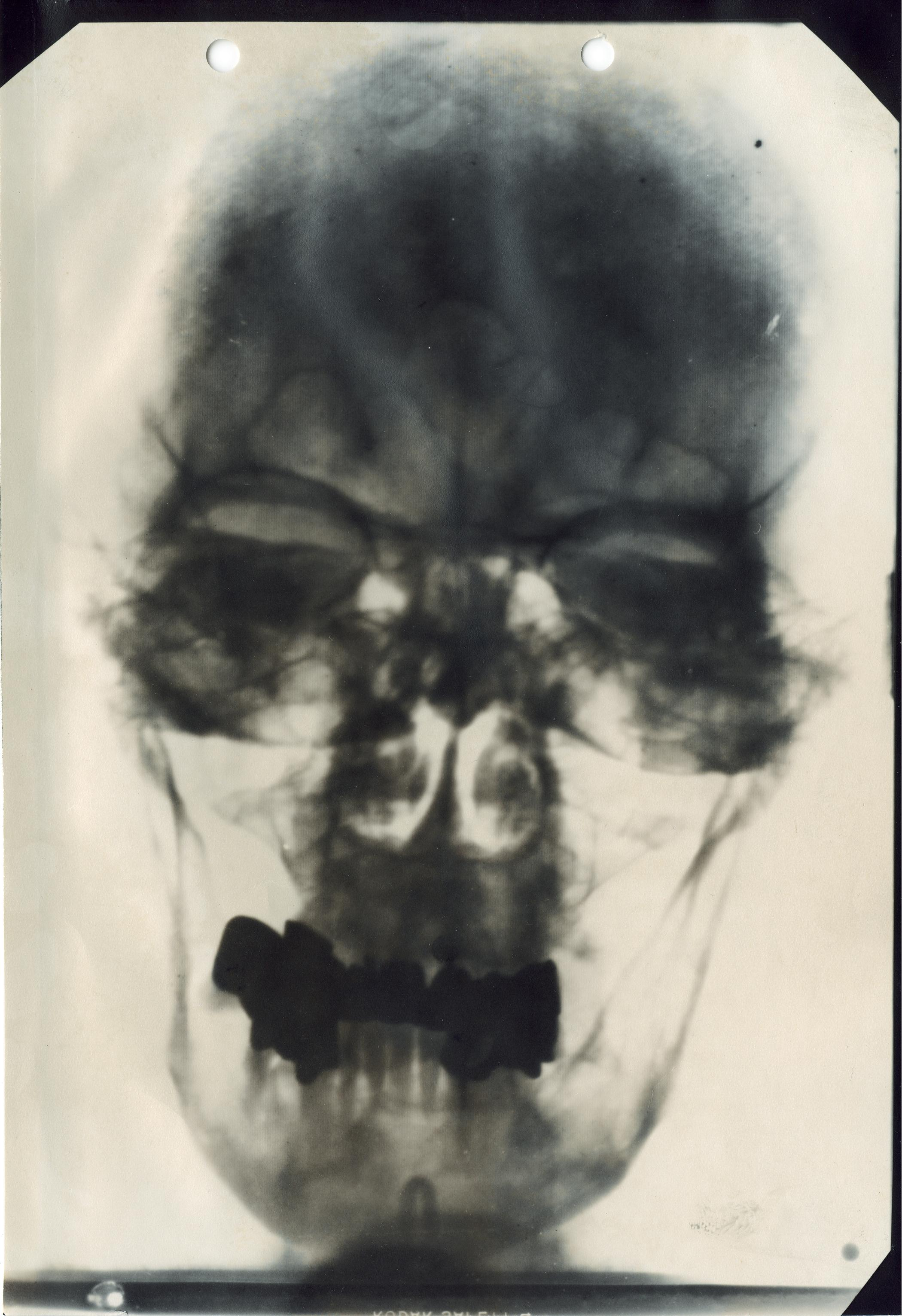
X-ray of Hitler's skull

Carlshof was taken over by the Schutzstaffel (SS) on 11 February 1941, which used the buildings as military hospital and barracks for the SS guards of the Wolf's Lair. Wilhelmsdorf became the airfield of Hitler's headquarters and the place of Fritz Todt's plane crash on 8 February 1942, the victims of the crash were laid out in the former Carlshof chapel. Claus von Stauffenberg used the airfield in the 20 July plot for his flight from and to Berlin. Hitler and the members of his staff wounded by Stauffenberg's bomb were treated in the Carlshof military hospital; Rudolf Schmundt, Günther Korten, and Heinz Brandt died here. In September and October 1944, five x-rays of Hitler's skull were made in the Carlshof hospital.

In 1947, after the expulsion of the local population, an agricultural school was established on the clinic grounds.
