= Viktor von Schwedler =

German general (1885–1954)

- Born: 18 January 1885; Sankt Goarshausen, German Empire
- Died: 30 October 1954 (aged 69); Freiburg im Breisgau, West Germany
- Military career
- Allegiance: German Empire; Weimar Republic; Nazi Germany
- Branch: German Army
- Service years: 1904–1945
- Rank: General der Infanterie
- Commands: IV Army Corps; Military District IV
- Conflicts: World War I; World War II; French Campaign; Battle of Gembloux; Operation Barbarossa
- Awards: Knight's Cross of the Iron Cross; Knight of Justice of the Order of Saint John

Viktor von Schwedler (18 January 1885 – 30 October 1954) was a general in the Wehrmacht of Nazi Germany who commanded an army corps and a military district during World War II. He was awarded the Knight's Cross of the Iron Cross.

Schwedler was made commanding general of the IV. Army Corps following the Blomberg-Fritsch Affair of 1938. He was transferred to the Führerreserve in October 1942. On 1 March 1943 he was appointed commanding general of the 4th Military District in Dresden a position he held until 31 January 1945. He was still responsible for the measures after the bombing of Dresden on 13 February and 15 February 1945.

== Early life and WW1 ==
Viktor von Schwedler was born on 18 January 1885 in Sankt Goarshausen. His father was an army officer. Viktor followed in his father's footsteps and after studying in various military schools, he joined the Imperial German army in early 1904 as a non-commissioned officer candidate. The following year, he became an officer in the 26th Infantry Regiment (1st Magdeburger) with the rank of second lieutenant. He later transferred to 88th Infantry Regiment (2nd Nassau).

Schwedler served in the German General Staff at the beginning of World War I and spent the entire war in staff duties. He was promoted to the rank of Captain in November 1914.

== Reichswehr ==
During the Weimar Republic, Schwedler served as a staff officer in the 3rd Cavalry Division in Kassel (1919), the 5th Military District in Stuttgart (1921–1919), and the Command Group 2 in Kassel. In 1923, he was promoted to the rank of major and commanded the 13th mortar company in the 15th infantry regiment in Kassel (1924-1925). Then he joined the staff of the 3rd Infantry Division in Potsdam. In early 1926, he was transferred to the Army Personnel Office in Berlin.

Schwedler with the rank of Oberstleutnant took command of the 2nd Battalion of the 9th Prussian Infantry Regiment in Berlin-Lichterfelde On February 1, 1929 . Two years later, he became Chief of Staff of the 3rd Infantry Division in Frankfurt-Oder. He was promoted to the rank of Oberst in 1932. He was selected as the head of the Army Personnel Office in October 1933. Schwedler was promoted to the rank of Generalmajor in October 1934 and exactly two years later to the rank of Generalleutnant.

== Wehrmacht ==
Following the seizure of power by the Nazi Party and the removal of some elements opposed to the state, Schwedler, who had relations with General Werner von Fritsch, the deposed commander in chief of the army, was promoted to the rank of General der Infanterie and was placed in command of military district IV with headquarters in Dresden on February 1, 1938. His previous key position was given to Bodewin Keitel who was a more reliable element.

=== World War II ===
After the start of the World War II in September 1939, most of the military districts were divided into field and regional commands. Schwedler was in charge of the field command called IV. Armeekorps. He participated in the battles of Poland (1939), Holland, Belgium and France (1940) with this corps. After the start of Operation Barbarossa, the invasion of the Soviet Union in June 1941, his corps was in the southern part of the Eastern Front.

During the Battle of Stalingrad, he was replaced by General of the Pioneers Erwin Jaenecke and transferred to the Führerreserve in October 1942. On March 1, 1943, he was appointed Commanding General of the Deputy General Command of the IV Army Corps in Dresden, thus making Schwedler commander of Wehrkreis IV again. On January 31, 1945, he was forced to relinquish his command and was not assigned a new position until the end of the war.

== Awards and decorations ==
- Knight's Cross of the Iron Cross on 29 June 1940 as General der Infanterie and commanding general of the IV. Armeekorps

Military offices
Preceded by General der Infanterie Wilhelm List	Commander of IV. Armeekorps; 4 February 1938 – 1 November 1942	Succeeded by General der Pioniere Erwin Jaenecke
