= General Hoffman =

General Hoffman, Hoffmann, or Hofmann may refer to:

- Carl W. Hoffman (1919–2016), U.S. Marine Corps major general
- Donald J. Hoffman (born 1952), U.S. Air Force four-star general
- Heinz Hoffmann (1910–1985), East German Land Forces general
- Max Hoffmann (1869–1927), Imperial German Army major general
- Robert A. Hoffmann (fl. 1960s–1990s), U.S. Air Force brigadier general
- Roy Hoffman (United States Army officer) (1869–1953), U.S. Army major general
- Rudolf Hofmann (1895–1970), German Wehrmacht general

== See also ==
- Günther Hoffmann-Schönborn (1905–1970), German Wehrmacht major general
- Attorney General Hoffman (disambiguation)
