= Russian minority in Poland =

Ethnic Group in Russia

Russians In Poland
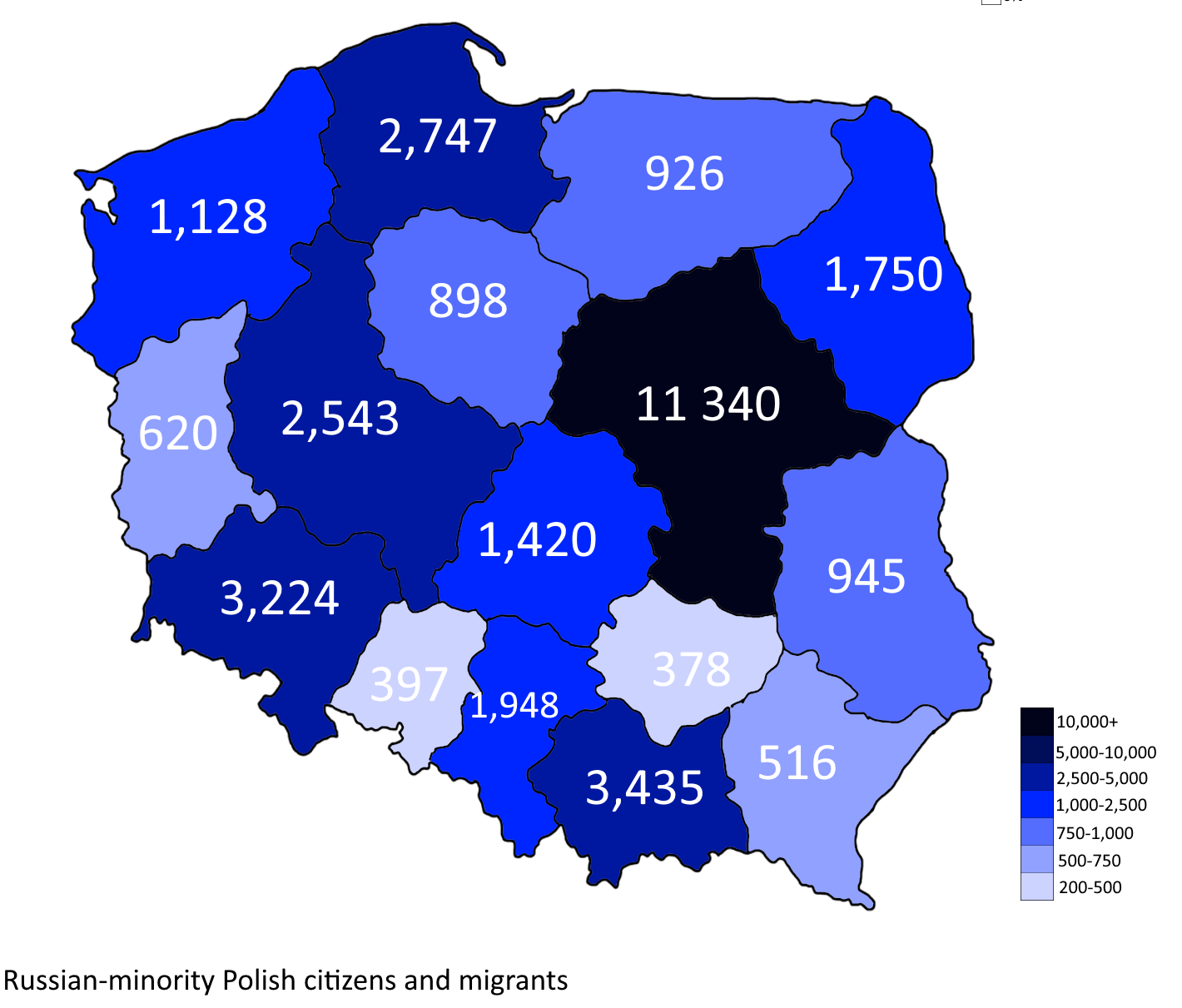
- Russian minority in Polish voivodeships

Total population
- 34,215 (2021 census and migrants)

Languages
- Polish, Russian

Religion
- Christianity (Eastern Orthodox Church, Old Believers), Jehovah's Witnesses

Related ethnic groups
- Russians, Ukrainians in Poland, Belarusian minority in Poland

The Russian minority in Poland (Russian: Русские в Польше, romanized: Russkiye v Polshe, Polish: Rosjanie w Polsce) consists of about 34,000 people (according to the Polish census of 2011).

In the past – the times of the Second Polish Republic, partitions of Poland and the Polish–Lithuanian Commonwealth – the number of Russians within Polish borders was much higher, over 100,000. Changing borders (see territorial changes of Poland) and forced resettlement after World War II drastically reduced this number.

One of the most defining cultural characteristics of that minority is their Eastern Orthodox faith.

== Notable people ==
- Aleksy Awdiejew – actor
- Ivan Vyrypaev – actor, director
- Zofia Licharewa – geologist
- Eugeniusz Malinowski – actor, singer, guitarist, conductor
- Yuriy Shatalov – football player, coach
- Maria Żuk – ballet artist
- Alina Kashlinskaya – chess player
- Jekaterina Kurakova – figure skater
- Vladimir Samoilov – figure skater
- Vladimir Siemirunniy – skater
- Jerzy Bułanow – football player
- Sasha Strunin – singer, director, visual artist, actress and former model
- Gleb Chugunov – speedway rider
- Artem Laguta – speedway rider
- Emil Sayfutdinov – speedway rider
- Valeriia Olianovskaia – tennis player

== See also ==
- Poland–Russia relations
- Polish minority in Russia
