= IV Army Corps (Wehrmacht) =

- IV. Armeekorps
- Emblem of the IV Corps
- Active: 1 October 1934 – 31 January 1943; 20 July 1943 – 10 October 1944
- Country: Germany
- Branch: Army
- Type: Corps; Panzer corps
- Role: Armoured warfare
- Size: Corps
- Garrison/HQ: Dresden
- Engagements: World War II: Invasion of Poland; Battle of France; Eastern Front; Battle of Stalingrad

IV Corps (IV. Armeekorps) was a corps level command of the German Army (Wehrmacht) before and during World War II.

== History ==
The IV Army Corps was formed on 1 October 1934 in Wehrkreis IV (4th Military District) in Dresden by the expansion of the 4th Infantry Division of the Reichswehr.

It was destroyed in the Battle of Stalingrad on 31 January 1943 and reformed on 20 July 1943.
The Corps was again destroyed in August 1944 during the Soviet Jassy–Kishinev Offensive, and its commander killed.
The Corps was redesignated as IV Panzer Corps on 10 October 1944 and as Panzer Corps Feldherrnhalle on 27 November 1944.

== Area of operations ==
- Poland (September 1939 – May 1940)
- France (May 1940 – June 1941)
- Eastern Front, southern sector (June 1941 – October 1942)
- Stalingrad (October 1942 – January 1943)
- Eastern Front, southern sector (July 1943 – October 1944)

== Commanders ==
- General der Infanterie Wilhelm List, (1 October 1935 - 4 February 1938)
- General der Infanterie Viktor von Schwedler, (4 February 1938 - 1 November 1942)
- General der Pioniere Erwin Jaenecke, (1 November 1942 - 17 January 1943)
- General der Artillerie Max Pfeffer, (17 - 31 January 1943)
- General der Infanterie Friedrich Mieth, (20 July 1943 - 10 October 1944) KIA on 2 September 1944

== See also ==
- List of German corps in World War II
