= Zofia Licharewa =

Polish geologist

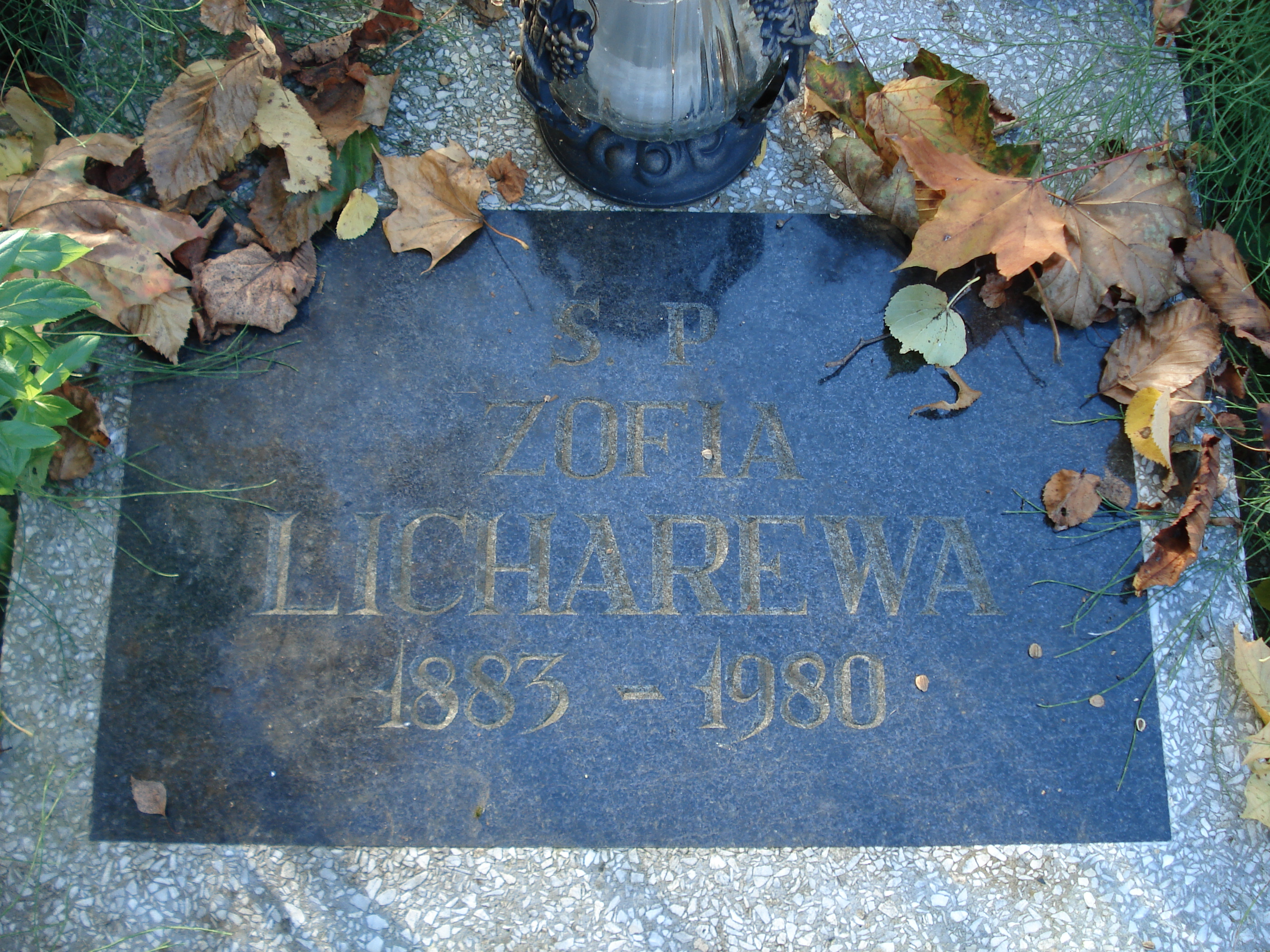
- The grave of Zofia Licharewa
- Born: 14 August 1883; Tosno, Russia
- Died: 11 October 1980 (aged 97); Kętrzyn, Poland
- Burial place: Kętrzyn municipal cemetery
- Education: Jagiellonian University
- Occupations: Geologist, museum founder
- Known for: Founding Museum Wojciech Kętrzyński

Zofia Licharewa (born 14 August 1883 in Tosno, died 11 October 1980 in Kętrzyn) was a Russia-born Polish geologist, protector of artifacts during wartime and founder of the Museum Wojciech Kętrzyński in Kętrzyn, Poland. Her last name is sometimes spelled Lichareva.

== Early years ==
Zofia Licharewa was born in Tosno (Russia, St. Petersburg Governorate) into the family of a tsarist officer. Her father, Alexei Likharev, was a major general. Mother, Maria Gruszecka, daughter of an engineering colonel, a graduate of the Pavlovsky Institute in St. Petersburg (1867), came from a Polish family. Zofia received a thorough home education. As the daughter of a major general, she participated in the coronation celebrations of Tsar Nicholas II. In 1904, Licharewa's father died and was buried in the Troitsky Sergeyevsky Orthodox Monastery in St. Petersburg.

Zofia Licharewa changed her religion from Orthodoxy to Catholicism, and beginning on 18 June 1905, she belonged to the Roman Catholic parish of Saint Catherine in St. Petersburg. Zofia entered a nunnery. With the consent of the Vatican, in 1906–1907 she studied at the Jagiellonian University in Kraków, Poland. Then in St. Petersburg she continued her studies at the Higher Women's Courses at the Faculty of Mathematics and Physics. There she studied physics and mineralogy. Licharewa knew the following languages: English, French, Latin, German, Polish and Russian.

She worked as a scientist at the Geological Committee in St. Petersburg and at the same time taught science at the Bernaskonia Gymnasium in St. Petersburg. In 1913, she was sent by the Catholic Church to China. There she worked as a teacher at the Shanghai International High School. In 1915 she returned to St. Petersburg (by then known as Petrograd), where, after completing the Sisters of Charity course at the Congregation of the Holy Trinity. She started working at the Polish Field Hospital.

During the years 1916–1918, Licharewa worked as a scientist and protector of the art monuments of Warmia and Mazury, Poland.

== After the Russian revolution ==
On 10 February 1919, she participated in a conference organized at the Russian Winter Palace about the need to organize a State Museum and the need to protect art monuments. In 1920, she participated in the expedition organized by Alexander Evgienjevich Fersman to the Arctic Circle regions of Russia where deposits of apatite were discovered in the Chibi tundras on the Kola Peninsula of northwest Russia. Regardless of her scientific work, in 1923 and 1924 she taught physics at the Polish Pedagogical Technical Secondary School. In the years 1925–1929, she worked as a scientist at the Geological Committee in Leningrad, (formerly known as St. Petersburg) and also gave lectures at the Agricultural University of Technology. The Russian Academy of Arts published her work: Strontcianite and Celestine and Clays of the Northern Regions. In 1929, she took Fersman's place at a scientific conference in Poland, where she was to remain.

== Polish citizenship ==
In the years 1929–1932, Licharewa worked at the Polish Geological Institute in Warsaw. In 1930, she conducted geological research in the Kielce and Krakow voivodeships. In 1931, Zofia Licharewa declared that she wanted to become a Polish citizen and renounced her USSR citizenship. She also presented evidence that she was of Polish origin from her mother's family. The granting of Polish citizenship was confirmed with an appropriate document by the Starosta of Grodzki, Southeastern Warsaw, MB Podhorodeński.

From 1933 on, she lived in Kraków, where she collaborated with the Slavic Study group of the Jagiellonian University. In 1939, she dealt with Polish-French relations at the Institute of Historical Research of the Jagiellonian University. From 1940 she lived in the Suwałki district on the Garbaś estate, located north of Lake Garbaś. The Garbaś estate belonged to the Gałdziewicz family. In October 1944, she was evacuated to Prussia due to the advancing Red Army at the end of World War II.

== Kętrzyn Museum ==
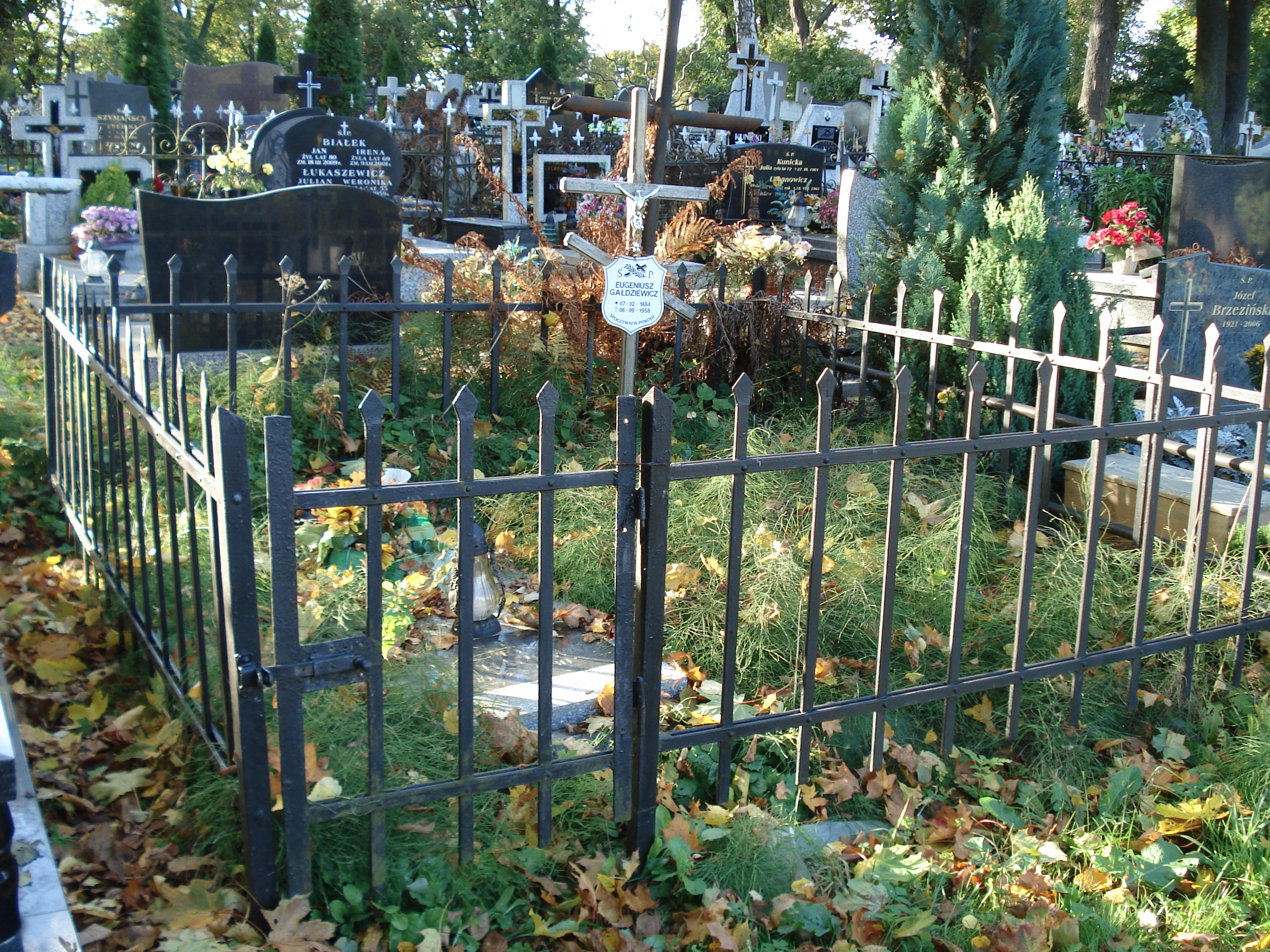
Licharewa gravesite

On 27 January 1945, Licharewa was in Krużany, Poland (now part of Kętrzyn near Kruszewiec), when the Red Army arrived there. From 14 February 1945, she lived in Wopławki, Poland. Beginning on 15 May 1945, she was an employee of the Culture Department of the District Office in nearby Rastembork. During that time, she tried to secure as many cultural assets as she could find in the city and in abandoned estates, including those that were not managed by Red Army administrators. When collecting works of art, she had a dangerous competitor, the Soviet secret police (NKVD), which stored its collections in the building of the current post office in Kętrzyn.

Licharewa was the first to reach Karolewo, which had been abandoned by the Red Army in October 1945. There, in a church turned into a warehouse, she discovered part of collections that had been taken from the Prussia Museum in Königsberg. In 1946, she organized the collected works into the Museum of Wojciech Kętrzyński in Kętrzyn in the former prison building (between the town hall and St. Catherine's Church) under her direction. (In May 1967, the small museum was finally moved to the more spacious rebuilt Teutonic castle.)

Thanks to Licharewa, the defensive walls of the old town survived - they were to be dismantled into bricks. Zofia Licharewa finished her professional career in February 1964 as the curator of the Museum she founded, by which time she was over 80 years old.

She died on 11 October 1980 and was buried in the city cemetery in Kętrzyn.

== Honors and recognition ==
- The Society of Lovers of the Kętrzyn Land operating in Kętrzyn is named after Lichareva.
- Licharewa was awarded the Silver Cross of Merit.
- A plaque honoring Licharewa stands on the Kętrzyn square named after her.
- A documentary film in Polish about Licharewa's preservation activities in Kętrzyn is titled: "We save monuments with Zofia Lichareva - make it before the looters".

== Selected works ==
Licharewa's works included the following studies: "Thought of the Orthodox Church of Ancient Russia", "About iconography and iconostasis", "Russian painting in Polish churches", "Frescoes in Sandomierz", "Old Grodno", "Hagia Sophia in Constantinople", "History of Russian Old Believers", "Old Believers in Poland", "Iconography in Nowogród" and "The Medieval Brotherhood of St. Zofia in Kraków.
