= Hugo von Kottwitz =

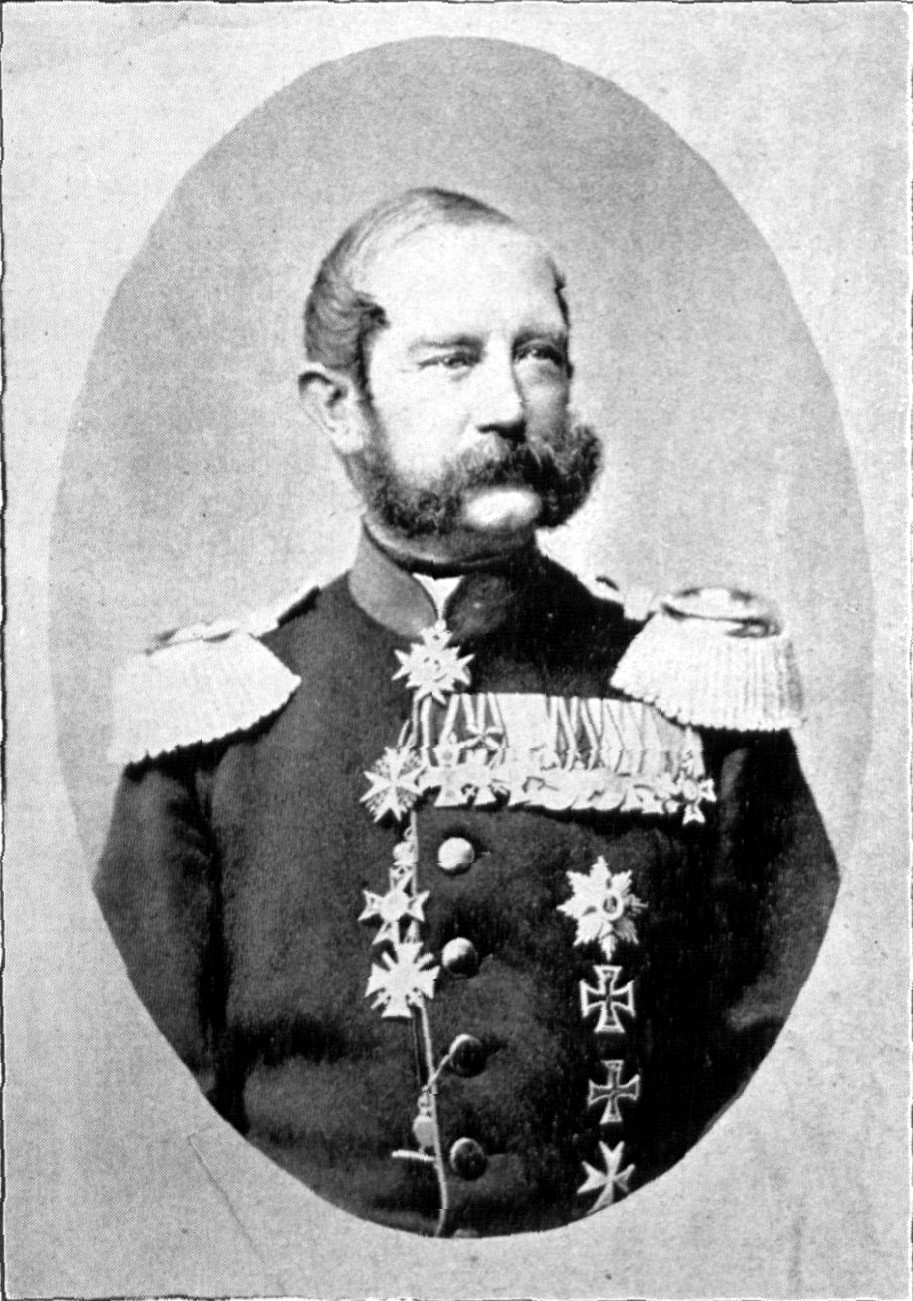
- Born: 6 January 1815; Wahlstatt, Silesia, Prussia
- Died: 13 May 1897 (aged 82); Stuttgart, Baden-Württemberg, German Empire
- Spouse: Alwine Adelaide Rosalie Charlotte von Eicke (m. 1839)
- Military career
- Service years: 1832–1878
- Rank: General of the Infantry
- Units: 11th Infantry Regiment, 4th Westphalian Infantry Regiment No. 17.
- Commands: 33rd Infantry Brigade, 76th Infantry Regiment, 33rd Infantry Brigade, 1st Division
- Conflicts: Austro-Prussian War; Battle of Königgrätz; Franco-Prussian War; Siege of Metz; Battle of Loigny and Poupry; Battle of Orléans, Battle of Le Mans
- Awards: Order of the Red Eagle, 3rd Class with Swords, Order of the Red Eagle, First Class with Oak Leaves and Swords, honorary knight of the Order of St. John

Hugo Karl Ernst Freiherr von Kottwitz (6 January 1815 – 13 May 1897) was a Silesian General of the Infantry and veteran of the Austro-Prussian War.

== Ancestry ==
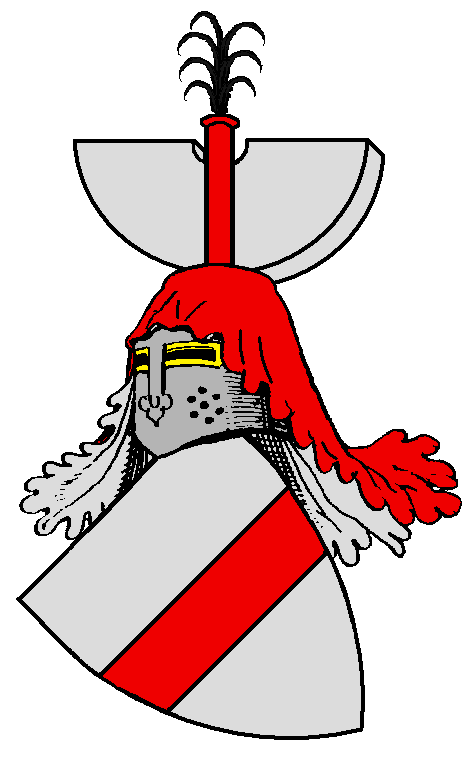
Kottwitz coat of arms

Hugo's paternal ancestry was the Kottwitz family, a Polish-Silesian family which traces it roots to the 13th century and had connections with the Order of the Teutonic Knights. The earliest Kottwitz was Hugo de Kottwitz who lived in the late 1100s and the early 1200s. The family were well-respected in the German lands and were praised by various monarchs including Frederick Barbarossa and Frederick II.

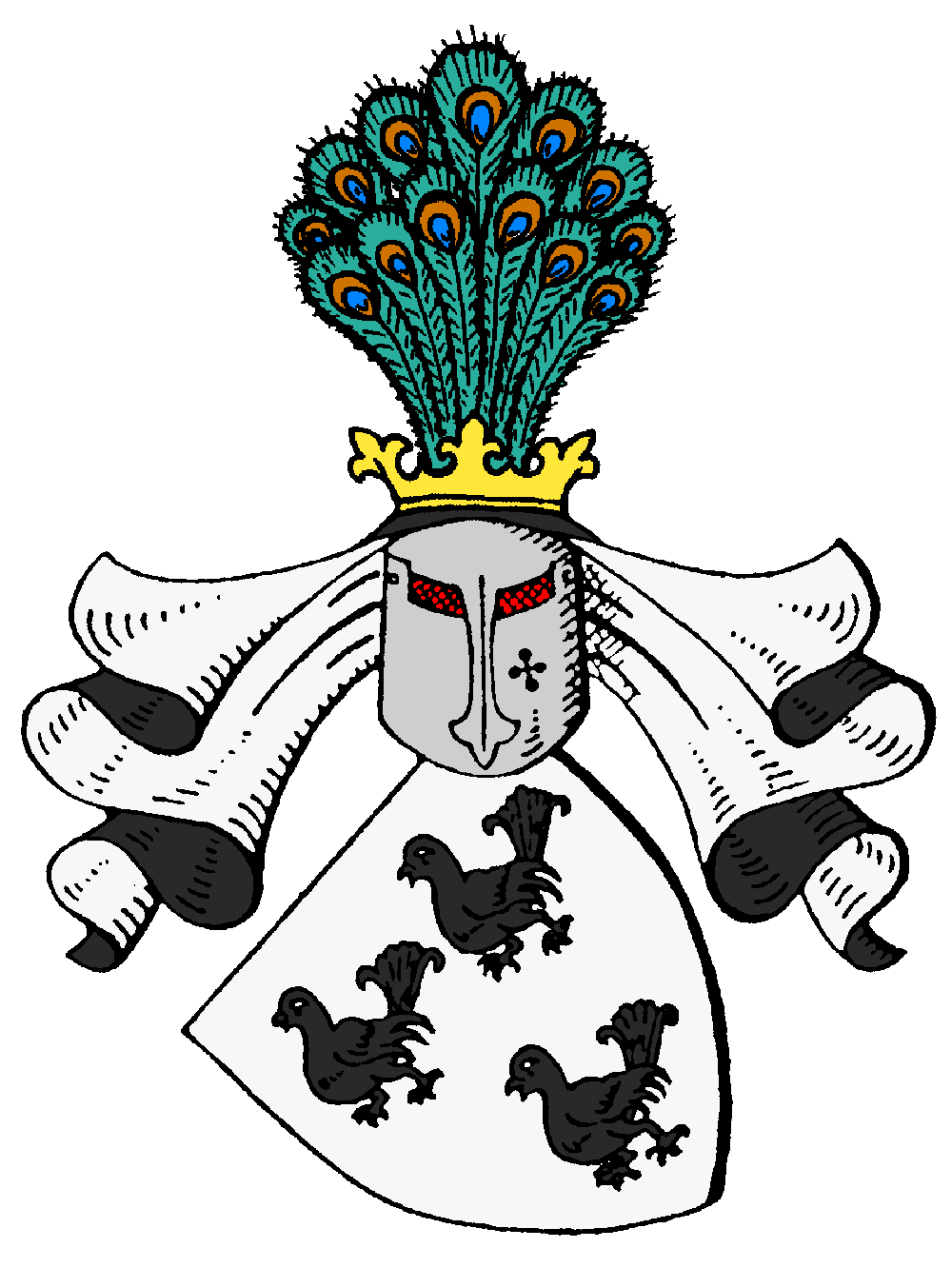
Birckhahn coat of arms

Hugo's maternal ancestry was the Birckhahn family. Birckhahn's were a noble family who traced their roots to Mecklenburg but moved to Prussia. Several Birckhahn's were high-ranking military and political figures, including: Jakob von Birckhahn (1580–1585), district administrator and chief magistrate of Riesenburg, Jakob Albrecht von Birkhahn (1733–1801), Prussian major general, Wilhelm von Birckhahn (1744–1819), District Administrator of the Pless district, Siegmund Ernst von Birckhahn, Prussian captain, 1745 Knight of the Order Pour le Mérite.

== Early life ==
Hugo was born in Silesia in 1815 to Karl Emil Rudolf Freiherr von Kottwitz (1785–1857) and Auguste von Birckhahn (1791–1863).

== Military career ==
On Hugo's 17th birthday, he joined the Prussian Army and was placed in the 11th Infantry Regiment in Breslau on his 17th birthday. He remained in this regiment until 3 April 1866, shortly before the Austro-Prussian War, when he was promoted to lieutenant colonel and appointed commander of the 4th Westphalian Infantry Regiment No. 17. His regiment belonged to the Army of the Elbe and distinguished itself at the Battle of Königgrätz by successfully storming the Bor Forest, which was held by Saxon troops. For this action, he received the Order of the Red Eagle, 3rd Class with Swords.

For the duration of the mobile deployment during the Franco-Prussian War, Kottwitz was appointed commander of the 33rd Infantry Brigade on 18 July 1870. This brigade consisted of the Hanseatic Regiments Nos. 75 and 76. It was subordinate to the 17th Infantry Division and part of the VIII Army Corps under the command of the Grand Duke of Mecklenburg. Kottwitz participated in the encirclement of Metz, Toul, and Paris. In November 1870, he was part of the German advance towards Le Mans. His brigade's successful attack on the town of Loigny and the subsequent holding of this position were crucial to the victory at the Battle of Loigny and Poupry on 2 December 1870. After the capture of Orléans, he participated in the decisive victory over the Army of the Loire at Le Mans.

On the day of the Battle of Loigny, 2 December 1870, he addressed the fusilier battalion of the 76th Infantry Regiment in the morning and urged them to "remember the valor of the Hanseatic League!" The battalion launched its attack northward while the other battalions turned toward Loigny. This thrust surprised the French so completely that they were overrun on their flank. They fled to the village of Fougeu and were driven out of there as well. When the 3rd Battalion of the 76th Infantry Regiment was later redesignated as the 2nd Battalion of the 3rd Hanseatic Infantry Regiment No. 162, this event, and thus General von Kottwitz as part of it, formed the defining myth of the Lübeck regiment.

After the war ended, Kottwitz, confirmed in his position as commander of the 33rd Infantry Brigade, was transferred from the army to the officers' corps on 13 July 1874, with the rank of division commander, and assigned to Württemberg. Initially entrusted with the command of the 26th Division in Stuttgart, Kottwitz was appointed commander on 23 July 1874, and promoted to lieutenant general on 18 January 1875. Relieved of his command in Württemberg, he finally became commander of the 1st Division in Königsberg on 22 December 1877, a position he held until 4 February 1878. He was then placed on the reserve list with a pension and awarded the Order of the Red Eagle, First Class with Oak Leaves and Swords.

== Post-war ==
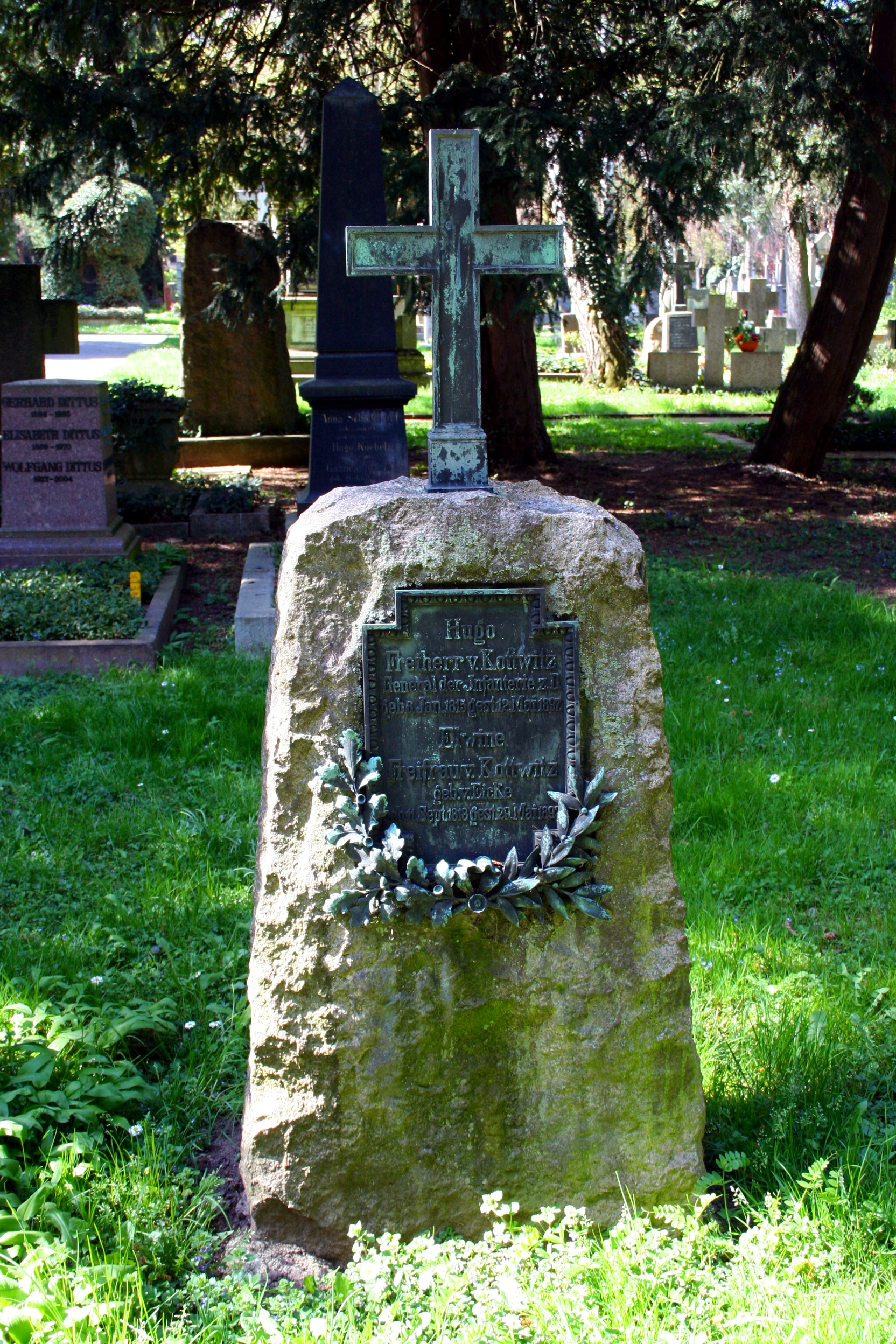
Hug von Kottwitz's grave in Stuttgart

On 2 December 1895, the 20th anniversary of the Battle of Loigny and Poupry, Kaiser Wilhelm II gave conferred upon him the honorary rank of General of the Infantry on 2 December 1895. Kottwitz was an honorary knight of the Order of St. John.

== Family ==
On 26 October 1839, Hugo married Alwine Adelaide Rosalie Charlotte von Eicke (1819–1892). Hugo and Alwine had two children: Hugo Karl Alfred Eugen Kottwitz and Alfred Kurt Ludwig Kottwitz.
