= Fritz Todt =

German engineer and senior Nazi figure (1891–1942)

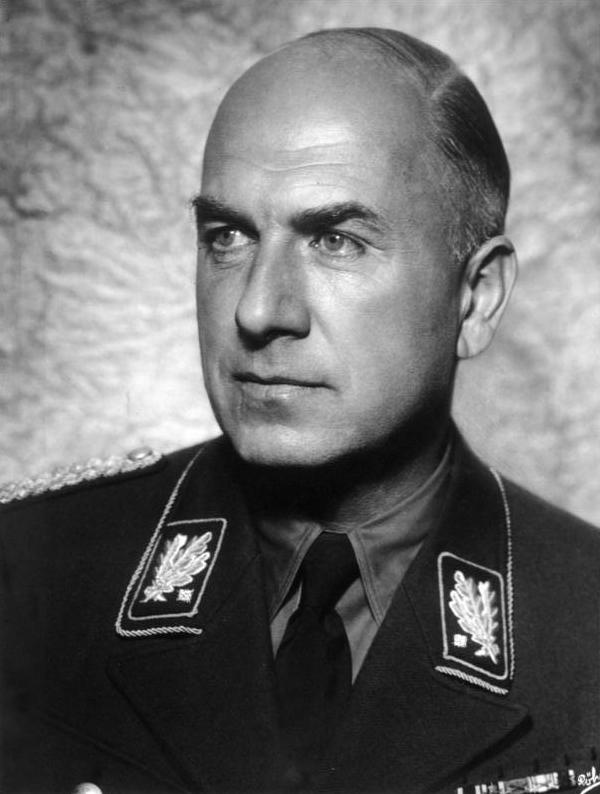
- Todt in 1940

Reich Minister for Armaments and Munitions
- In office 17 March 1940 – 8 February 1942
- Leader: Adolf Hitler (Führer)
- Preceded by: Position established
- Succeeded by: Albert Speer

Inspector General for Water and Energy
- In office 29 July 1941 – 8 February 1942
- Preceded by: Position established
- Succeeded by: Albert Speer

General Plenipotentiary for Regulation of the Construction Industry
- In office 9 December 1938 – 8 February 1942
- Preceded by: Position established
- Succeeded by: Albert Speer

Head of Organisation Todt
- In office May 1938 – 8 February 1942
- Preceded by: Position established
- Succeeded by: Albert Speer

Inspector General for German Roadways
- In office 5 July 1933 – 8 February 1942
- Preceded by: Position established
- Succeeded by: Albert Speer

Personal details
- Born: 4 September 1891 Pforzheim, Grand Duchy of Baden, German Empire (in modern Baden-Württemberg, Germany)
- Died: 8 February 1942 (aged 50) near Wilhelmsdorf, East Prussia, Nazi Germany (modern Wilamowo, Poland)
- Resting place: Invalids' Cemetery, Berlin
- Party: Nazi Party
- Parent(s): Emil Todt (father); Elise Unterecker (mother)
- Education: Technical University of Munich; Karlsruhe Institute of Technology
- Profession: Civil engineer
- Cabinet: Hitler Cabinet
- Civilian awards: German Order

Military service
- Allegiance: German Empire; Nazi Germany
- Branch/service: Luftstreitkräfte; Luftwaffe
- Years of service: 1914–1918; 1939–1942
- Rank: Leutnant of the reserves Generalmajor der Luftwaffe (Honorary); SA–Obergruppenführer
- Battles/wars: World War I World War II
- Military awards: Iron Cross

Fritz Todt ([fʁɪt͡s tɔt]; 4 September 1891 – 8 February 1942) was a German construction engineer and senior political figure of the Nazi Party. In 1938, he founded Organisation Todt (OT), a military-engineering organization that supplied German industry with forced labor, and he served as Reich Minister for Armaments and Ammunition in Nazi Germany early in World War II, directing the entire German wartime military economy from that position.

An engineer by training, Todt served in the Luftstreitkräfte during World War I and was a recipient of the Iron Cross. He joined the Nazi Party in 1922 and the Sturmabteilung (SA) in 1931. Steadily rising through the ranks, Todt became Inspector General for German Roadways after Adolf Hitler came to power. In that capacity, he was responsible for the construction of the German autobahns. Todt also directed large-scale engineering projects such as the construction of the Westwall (Siegfried Line) and the Atlantic Wall. In 1940, he was appointed Reich Minister of Armaments and War Production. During the war, OT made extensive use of upwards of 800,000 slave laborers from German-occupied territories. Todt's agency can be linked to the Holocaust as SS personnel collaborating with OT murdered many of the forced laborers (especially Jews) on the pretext of eliminating security risks or as a component of the Nazi genocidal programme.

Todt was killed along with four other people in February 1942 near Wilhelmsdorf when his aircraft crashed en route from Rastenburg to Berlin-Tempelhof. He was succeeded as Reichsminister and head of the OT by Albert Speer.

== Early life and education ==
Todt was born in Pforzheim in the Grand Duchy of Baden (now in Baden-Württemberg) to Emil Todt (1861–1909) and his wife, Elise, née Unterecker (1868–1935). His father owned a small ring factory.

In 1910, he volunteered for one-year military service. From 1911 to 1914, Todt studied engineering at Technical Hochschule of Munich and Karlsruhe, graduating with a Diplom degree in construction engineering from the latter.

During World War I, he served with the infantry and then as an observer in the Luftstreitkräfte, winning the Iron Cross; Todt had been wounded in combat. After the war he resumed his studies and completed them at Karlsruhe in 1920. In 1921, Todt married Elsbeth Müller, who bore him four children, three daughters and a son; the latter died in 1944.

== Career ==
In 1921, he worked on waterpower stations for the Grün & Bilfinger AG, Mannheim company and the same year for the civil engineering company Sager & Woerner where he worked until 1933. In January 1922, he joined the Nationalsozialistische Deutsche Arbeiterpartei (NSDAP), or Nazi Party. In 1931, he joined the Sturmabteilung (SA), which was then commanded by Ernst Röhm. He rose steadily through its ranks, attaining the rank of SA-Obergruppenführer in September 1938. In 1932, Todt completed his thesis at Technical Hochschule of Munich Fehlerquellen beim Bau von Landstraßendecken aus Teer und Asphalt ("Sources of defects in the construction of tarmac and asphalt road surfaces") and became a Doctor of Engineering (Dr.-Ing.).

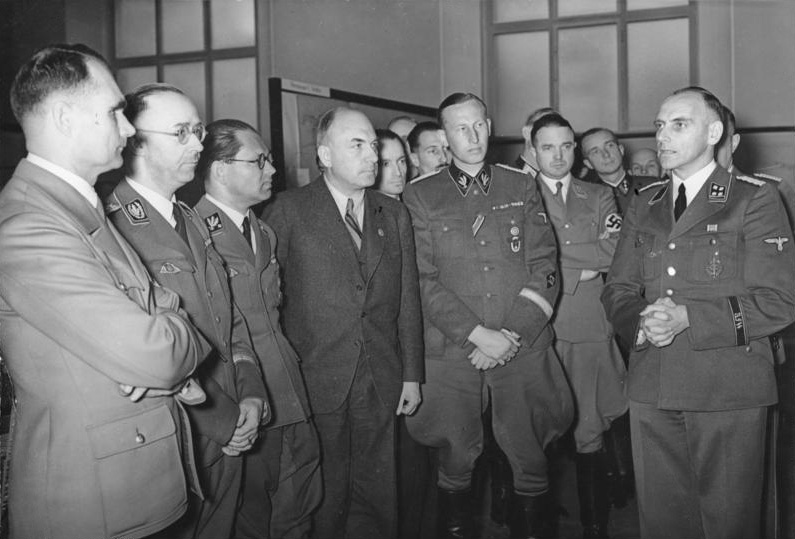
Rudolf Hess, Heinrich Himmler, Philipp Bouhler, Reich Minister Todt and Reinhard Heydrich (from left), listening to Konrad Meyer at a Generalplan Ost exhibition, 20 March 1941

On 5 July 1933, five months after Adolf Hitler became Reichskanzler, Todt was appointed Generalinspektor für das deutsche Straßenwesen (Inspector General for German Roadways). In November, Todt's public authority was raised to the status of a "Supreme Reich Authority" (Oberste Reichsbehörde) outside the hierarchy of Reich Ministries; Todt was subordinated directly to Hitler. Alan S. Milward wrote

His personal views on business questions and, what was more important, the success of the motorway project kept Todt in the inner circle of the Führer. At the same time, his deliberate pose as a technical expert, as a man without interest in internal power struggles...shielded him from the hostility of the more prominent Party leaders.

He was given the task of organizing a new construction company for the motorways (Reichsautobahnen). (Note: Meanwhile, Todt also edited the journal Die Strasse, which was a publication of his from 1934 to 1942. See: R. Vahrenkamp Register for "Die Strasse") According to historian Adam Tooze, Todt was selected for his political commitment to the Nazi cause, for being an 'old fighter' of the Nazi Party who was unquestioningly loyal to Hitler, and for his embrace of the Nazi's racial Weltanschauung. Hitler allocated 5 billion Reichsmarks for the Autobahn project over a 5-year period and entrusted Todt to oversee it in its entirety. Historian Frank McDonough avows that the extensive road network's "underlying rationale" was to "speed up military transport during a war." (Note: Tooze shares a similar opinion, writing: "the ultimate rationale for these gigantic roadways was military. Germany's fundamental strategic dilemma was its vulnerability to military attack from both east and west. The autobahns would serve as the 'lifeline' of a reconstructed national defence system.") For his work on the autobahns, Todt was recognized with the German National Prize for Art and Science by Hitler, next to Ernst Heinkel, Ferdinand Porsche and Willy Messerschmitt. Hitler donated the award during 1937, devised as a replacement for the Nobel Prize, which Hitler forbade Germans from accepting in 1936.

In December 1936, he became Leiter des Hauptamts für Technik in der Reichsleitung der NSDAP (Director of the Head Office for Engineering in the National Directorate of the NSDAP) and, in December 1938, Generalbevollmächtigter für die Regelung der Bauwirtschaft (General Plenipotentiary for the Regulation of the Construction Industry) in the Four Year Plan. At the beginning of World War II in Europe, he was also appointed to the rank of Generalmajor of the Luftwaffe.

In May 1938, he initiated the Organisation Todt—named such by Hitler himself, who announced this at a Nazi Party rally in Nuremberg—joining government firms, private companies and the Reichsarbeitsdienst (Reich Labour Service). The OT eventually used up to 800,000 forced laborers (Zwangsarbeiter) from countries that Germany occupied during World War II. Todt was responsible for the construction of the "West Wall" (commonly named the "Siegfried Line" in English-speaking countries) to defend the Reich territory. For the West Wall, Todt assembled some 350,000 workers, drawn foremost from among former autobahn construction workers, to which 100,000 Reich Labor Service workers and 90,000 army engineers were added, and he also used his "well-developed contacts" with German industry magnates from nearly 1,000 individual firms. By the time the Westwall was completed in the summer of 1939, the new fortifications consisted of 11,283 bunkers and gun emplacements.

Notwithstanding his disagreements with Reichsmarschall Hermann Göring over energy policy, it was Göring who appointed Todt Plenipotentiary for the Regulation of Construction on 9 December 1938—a mandate whose execution reveals Todt's investment in modern technology and the technocratic aspirations of the engineering profession. Todt simplified the issues complicating the Nazi state's manufacturing practices, like its "manifold regulations, intrusive price controls" and its "ill-coordinated procurement processes". The program he advanced was simultaneously technical and ideological: mechanization, fixed material quotas, labor reallocation, production rationalization, and the closure of unproductive building sites, each measure underwritten by his insistent demand that entrepreneurs, engineers, and workmen alike reconstitute themselves as "more productive Volk comrades." Resistance from the military and local Party leadership makes the program's relative success the more telling; within little more than a year, Göring elevated Todt to Inspector General for Special Tasks in the Four Year Plan, extending his technocratic remit beyond construction into the broader structural deficiencies of the war economy.

On 1 January 1939, Todt assumed the chairmanship of the Verein Deutscher Ingenieure (VDI), completing the process of professional coordination that the Party had pursued, with considerably less success, since Gottfried Feder's failed attempt to achieve the same objective in 1933. With Germany's most prestigious technical association now fully integrated into the new order, its institutional weight served as an implicit warning to any professional body within Germany that continued to withhold cooperation from the Nazi Party.

During February 1940, Göring named Todt Inspector General for Extraordinary Activities in the Four Year Plan, after which the Reichsmarschall instructed "the agencies of the state, Party, and armed forces, as well as business" to provide their "support" to the "Inspector General in every way."

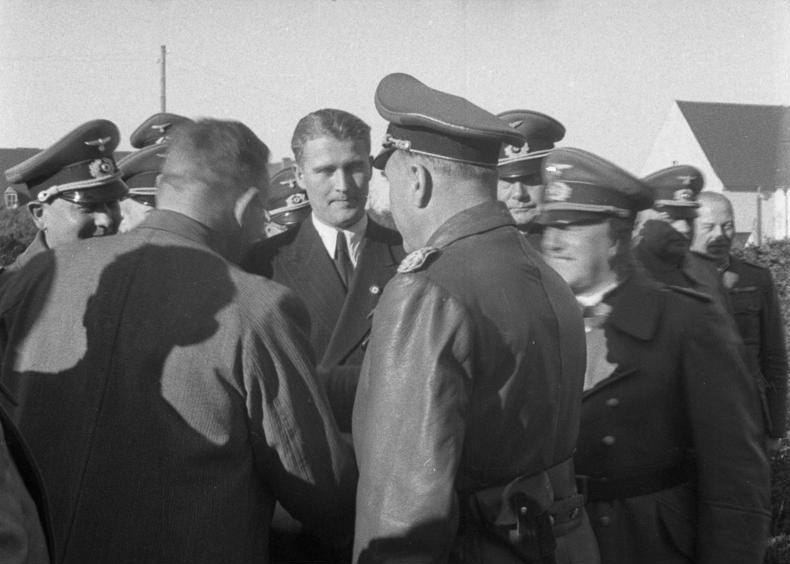
Todt with Wernher von Braun at Peenemünde, 21 March 1941

On 17 March 1940, Todt was appointed Reichsminister für Bewaffnung und Munition (Minister for Armaments and Munitions otherwise known as the Ministry of Ammunition) which meant he managed the entire military economy. This appointment was in many ways "a calculated snub" to officers in the army procurement office, which General Karl Becker attempted to reverse only to be upstaged by Erich Mueller—a weapons designer from Krupp—who had Hitler's ear and impressed upon him the need to stay with Todt in this role instead of a "soldier". Production of munitions doubled in the first half of 1940, and Hitler subsequently gave sole credit to Todt during a victory speech during the summer.

In October 1940, Todt formed a colonial working group focused on road construction in preparation for what Nazi leaders saw as an imminent return of Germany's African colonies. Todt wanted to use Fascist Italy's empire as a model for the development of a Nazi colonial empire.

Intending to maximize industrial productive output through "rationalization", Hitler met with both Todt and General Georg Thomas in May 1941 at Berchtesgaden, where he "outlined his plans for increasing the efficiency of the war economy." (Note: Todt had singled out the brick industry as emblematic of the broader problem, insisting that it "demands energetic measures of rationalization and mechanization" more urgently than any other sector of the building economy, and disparaging those producers "who still work with manual craft processes that have not changed in operation for 30 to 40 years.") In this case, rationalization entailed less technical demand from the military via the production of highly advanced specialized weaponry and instead, focused on a "return to more primitive, robust construction" that would better facilitate mass production; this was later accompanied by a Führer Order on "Simplified and Increased Efficiency in Armaments Production." Subsequent to Hitler's directive, by November 1940, Todt had established a system of committees, each responsible for specific armament types; the first ones being for "armoured vehicles, munitions, weapons, machine tools, and general military equipment." German industrialists elected to characterize Todt's ammunition committees as "a fundamental break with all previous practice"—conveniently eliding the procurement efforts of his predecessors—which revealed less a genuine rupture than a calculated embrace of "the ugly cocktail of Nazi leadership doctrine (Führertum) and the self-serving rhetoric of entrepreneurial dynamism (Unternehmertum) that was soon to become the guiding ideology of the German war economy."

After the invasion of the Soviet Union in June 1941, Todt was appointed to manage the restoration of the infrastructure there, as well as plans for more armaments production. Hitler's insistence on making the army more mobile with another 36 Panzer and 18 motorized divisions placed "exceptional demands" on Germany's industrial economy in Todt's estimation. The ideological significance of the enhanced influence with Hitler acquired by Nazi engineers like Todt during the war years was an outgrowth of the technical demands of modern warfare, individual career ambition, and the Führer's admiration for Todt's unbureaucratic methods.

In late July 1941, Todt was named Generalinspekteur für Wasser und Energie (Inspector General for Water and Energy). During that year, he became increasingly distant from the commanders of the Wehrmacht, in particular from Hermann Göring, the Oberbefehlshaber der Luftwaffe (Commander-in-chief of the Luftwaffe).

By the summer's end of 1941, Germany confronted structural crises—an acute coal shortage with direct consequences for steel and armaments production, a fuel crisis in the autumn, and severe inflationary pressures—to the degree that Tooze characterized the situation as a "bankruptcy" of the Nazi's "entire war-fighting strategy." For Todt, the situation had become untenable: the difficulties encountered by the Wehrmacht, particularly Army Group Center's failure at Moscow, the chronic shortages of arms, and the prospect of American belligerence combined to produce a settled despair about Germany's prospects for victory. Between November 29, 1941, and what appears to have been a stormy final confrontation on February 7, 1942, Todt presented Hitler on four separate occasions with statistical and factual arguments for ending the war. Walter Rohland, head of the Main Committee for tank production and Todt's emissary to the front, recorded in his memoirs that at the first of these meetings Todt told Hitler plainly: "This war can no longer be won by military means" and stressed that a political solution was necessary. (Note: Albert Speer claimed that after the meeting with Hitler, Todt "seemed strained and fatigued" but refused to discuss any details about the matter.) Hitler rejected Todt's assessment in heated discussions the night before Todt's ill-fated plane crash and elected to continue the offensive against the Soviets.

== Death ==
On 8 February 1942, sometime after taking off from the Wolfsschanze ("Wolf's Lair") airfield near Rastenburg, in East Prussia, Todt's Heinkel He 111 aircraft crashed near the village of Wilhelmsdorf and he was killed. (Note: Also see the article in The New York Times, "Todt's Death Seen as Help to Goering".) He was buried in the Invalids' Cemetery in the Scharnhorst-Strasse in Berlin. Posthumously, he became the first recipient of the new Deutscher Orden ("German Order").

During Todt's funeral oration, Hitler pronounced him as "the most powerful builder of all time," recalled the Reich Minister's early commitment to the NSDAP, his Party career, and praised his oversight of both the autobahns and Westwall's construction. Nazi theorist and ideologue Alfred Rosenberg offered a characteristically ideological gloss, casting Todt as a creative engineer possessed of deep feeling for the profound laws of nature and animated by a love of art. Hitler's funeral observations aside, it has been suggested that Todt had been the victim of an assassination orchestrated by the Führer, but that has never been confirmed and the evidence does not support this claim. A possible motive for killing Todt was that he had flown to the Wolf's Lair to recommend that Hitler sue for peace with the Soviet Union. Todt's production figures suggested that the German economy was not able to support the defeat of Russia.

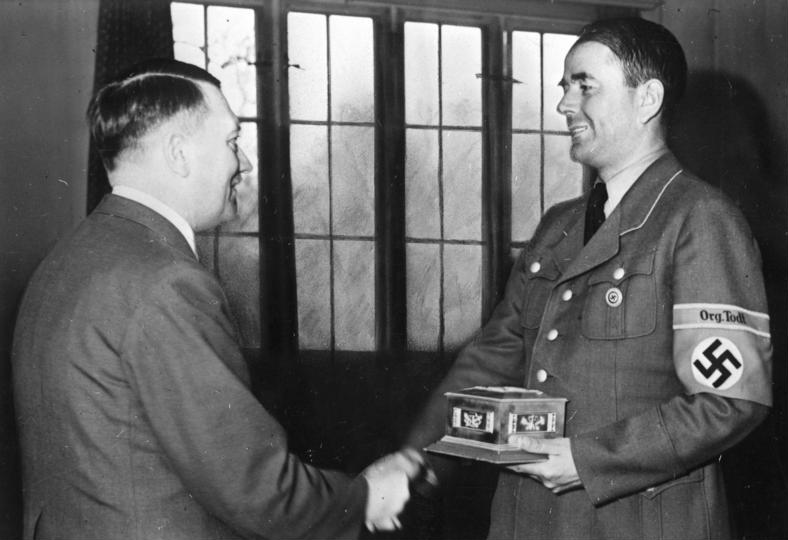
Adolf Hitler presenting Albert Speer with the Fritz-Todt-Ring, 13 May 1943.

Todt's successor as Reichsminister was Albert Speer, whom Hitler awarded the "Dr Todt Ring" on 13 May 1943. To reduce the bureaucratization, political infighting, and jurisdictional arguments that had plagued the war effort, Hitler gave his new Minister of Armaments wide executive powers and reduced the role of the military and Göring when it came to production; this allowed Speer to cite the Führer's direct support and helped eliminate technical and economic disputes under those auspices. Not long after Todt's death and Speer's ascendancy, the so-called "production miracle" of 1942–1944 ensued, begun by the former Minister of Armaments (Todt) but advanced by Speer's more sweeping authority and sway with Hitler.

=== Accident investigation ===
Speer was supposed to be on the same plane as Todt departing Rastenburg for Berlin on 8 February but had elected to sleep in that day. In his autobiography, Speer mentioned a Reich Air Ministry inquiry into the airplane accident, which he said ended with the sentence: "The possibility of sabotage is ruled out. Further measures are therefore neither requisite nor intended". Even Todt's own son Fritz (named for his father)—who became a pilot—claimed to have investigated the matter and concluded "there was no explosive device on the plane."

== Holocaust complicity ==
On 17 October 1941, Hitler expounded before Todt and Gauleiter Fritz Sauckel his programme for the conquered East—Slavic populations to be treated like "Red Indians", urban populations starved, "destructive Jewish elements" exterminated immediately—leaving no participant uninformed of the murderous campaign to which the Einsatzgruppen massacres and the Hunger Plan had already led to for Jews and Slavic peoples.

Though the Organisation Todt is conventionally characterized as a construction body rather than a criminal one, the evidence suggests a more incriminating picture. (Note: For instance, historian Fabian Lemmes makes it clear that the initiative for brutalizing "recruited" labor did not originate with the military administration but with the OT's own leadership, who pressed the military to deploy "all available means, including force" against workers deemed unwilling. Lemmes also establishes that by the time of its greatest expansion between May 1942 and May 1943, the OT employed approximately 1.5 million Germans and non-Germans and benefited indirectly from the labor of more than two million people. The workforce in France on the eve of the Normandy landings comprised nearly 300,000 persons—among them 15,000 Germans, 85,000 metropolitan French, 25,000 colonial French subjects, and 165,000 third-country foreigners, including so-called Rotspanier (Spanish Republican refugees), Poles, Czechs, Italians, Dutch, Belgians, and approximately 15,000 Ostarbeiter—as well as French and foreign Jews compelled to perform forced labor.) An example includes the deportation of Jewish men and their relatives from Antwerp to OT labor camps in northern France in the summer of 1942, rendering the OT camps "one of the most threatening steps in the racial persecution of the Jewish population in Belgium." Another telling example stems from late January 1945, when approximately 7,000 Jewish women were mercilessly force-marched from Stutthof satellite camps near Danzig to the Baltic coastal locality of Palmnicken—a column directed by 25 guards from the SS and more than 120 members of Organisation Todt. Only 3,000 women survived to reach Palmnicken; the remainder perished en route, among them over 2,000 shot after they collapsed from exhaustion. Only 15 persons amid the original 7,000 force-marched to Palmnicken survived.

Organisation Todt personnel moved between technical and lethal roles, as its architects became task-group leaders overseeing slave labor, its surveyors coordinated with SS execution squads and its medical staff conducted work fitness selections for Auschwitz. At the end of 1944, there were 130,000 concentration camp inmates working for the OT among those considered "fit" for work. The institutional flexibility that allowed the Ordnungspolizei to change from routine policing to mass murder operated within OT—personnel were assigned to whatever the regime required. Members of formally designated criminal organizations, including the SS, served within OT ranks without friction, and the organization's indifference to the motivations of its personnel extended equally to its ambivalence to their methods, provided the work in service to the Reich was completed. Commenting on Todt specifically, historian Charles Dick avows that "he viewed Jews, Slavs and other prisoners as expendable to achieve his goals." Organisation Todt and its founder (including Todt's successor, Albert Speer) bear substantial responsibility for the genocides and the catastrophic mortality of Nazi slave-labor—a culpability that warrants their unambiguous recognition among the principal instruments of the regime's criminal enterprise.

== Major awards ==
- 1918 Iron Cross
- 1937 Werner von Siemens Ring
- 1938 German National Prize for Art and Science
- 1939 Grand Cross of the Order of the Crown of Italy
- 1942 German Order

== See also ==
- Economy of Nazi Germany
- Forced labor under German rule during World War II
- Nazi architecture

== Bibliography ==
- Allen, Michael Thad (2002). The Business of Genocide: The SS, Slave Labor, and the Concentration Camps. London and Chapel Hill: The University of North Carolina Press. ISBN 978-0-80782-677-5.
- Angolia, John (1978). For Führer and Fatherland: Political & Civil Awards of the Third Reich. R. James Bender Publishing. ISBN 978-0-91213-816-9.
- Axelssonby, George A. (10 February 1942). "Todt's death". The New York Times.
- Bernhard, Patrick (11 October 2013). "Borrowing from Mussolini: Nazi Germany's Colonial Aspirations in the Shadow of Italian Expansionism". The Journal of Imperial and Commonwealth History. 41 (4): 617–643. doi:10.1080/03086534.2013.836358. S2CID 159508872.
- Dick, Charles (2025). Unknown Enemy: The Hidden Nazi Force That Built the Third Reich. New York: Bloomsbury Publishing. ISBN 978-1-63973-744-4.
- Evans, Richard (2005). The Third Reich in Power. New York: Penguin. ISBN 978-0-14303-790-3.
- Evans, Richard (2010). The Third Reich at War. New York: Penguin. ISBN 978-0-14311-671-4.
- Guse, John C. (2023). Nazi Volksgemeinschaft Technology: Gottfried Feder, Fritz Todt, and the Plassenburg Spirit. Cham: Palgrave Macmillan. ISBN 978-3-031-32055-2.
- Hayes, Peter (2025). Profits & Persecution: German Big Business in the Nazi Economy and the Holocaust. Cambridge and New York: Cambridge University Press. ISBN 978-0-52177-288-4.
- Kay, Alex J. (2021). Empire of Destruction: A History of Nazi Mass Killing. Yale University Press. ISBN 978-0-300-26253-7.
- Kirkham, James F.; Levy, Sheldon G.; Crotty, William J. (1969). Assassination and Political Violence. Vol. 8. Washington, D.C.: National Commission on the Causes and Prevention of Violence. ISBN 0-87754-281-3. OCLC 19993393.
- Klee, Ernst (2016). Personenlexikon zum Dritten Reich: Wer war was vor und nach 1945 (in German). Hamburg: Nikol Verlag. ISBN 978-3-86820-311-0.
- Kuhn, Stefan (2015). "Fritz Todt (1891–1942)". Deutsches Historisches Museum / LeMO – Lebendiges Museum Online (in German).
- Lemmes, Fabian (2010). "Zwangsarbeit im besetzten Europa. Die Organization Todt in Frankreich und Italien, 1940–1945". In Heusler, Andreas; Spoerer, Mark; Trischler, Helmuth (eds.). Rüstung, Kriegswirtschaft und Zwangsarbeit im "Dritten Reich" (in German). Oldenbourg Wissenschaftsverlag. pp. 219–252. doi:10.1524/9783486709780.219.
- Longerich, Peter (2019). Hitler: A Biography. Oxford and New York: Oxford University Press. ISBN 978-0-19005-673-5.
- Ludwig, Karl-Heinz (1982). "Todt, Fritz". Badische Biographien. Neue Folge (in German). Vol. 1. Stuttgart: Kohlhammer.
- McDonough, Frank (2021a). The Hitler Years: Triumph, 1933–1939. New York: St. Martin's Press. ISBN 978-1-25027-510-3.
- McDonough, Frank (2021b). The Hitler Years: Disaster, 1940–1945. New York: St. Martin's Press. ISBN 978-1-25027-512-7.
- Milward, Alan S. (1966). "Fritz Todt als Minister für Bewaffnung und Munition" (PDF). Vierteljahrshefte für Zeitgeschichte (in German). 14 (1). Munich: Oldenbourg Wissenschaftsverlag GmbH: 40–58.
- Overy, Richard (1994). War and Economy in the Third Reich. Oxford: Clarendon Press. ISBN 978-0-19820-599-9.
- Sofsky, Wolfgang (1997). The Order of Terror: The Concentration Camp. Princeton, NJ: Princeton University Press. ISBN 978-0-69100-685-7.
- Speer, Albert (1995). Inside the Third Reich. Translated by Richard and Clara Winston. New York: Galahad Books. ISBN 0-88365-924-7.
- Stephenson, Charles (2006). The Channel Islands 1941–45: Hitler's Impregnable Fortress. Osprey Publishing. p. 16. ISBN 978-1-84176-921-9.
- Styven, Dorien; Daelen, Veerle Vanden (2023). "Craving News from Dear Ones: The Impact of Organization Todt Forced Labour on the Survival Chances of the Families of the Jewish Workers from Antwerp". In Bonnesoeur, Frédéric; Wilson, Hannah; Zühlke, Christin (eds.). New Microhistorical Approaches to an Integrated History of the Holocaust. Berlin: De Gruyter Oldenbourg. pp. 345–360. doi:10.1515/9783110733860-019. ISBN 978-3-11073-386-0.
- Tooze, Adam (2007). The Wages of Destruction: The Making and Breaking of the Nazi Economy. New York: Viking. ISBN 978-0-67003-826-8.
- Ullrich, Volker (2020). Hitler: Downfall, 1939–1945. Knopf. ISBN 978-1-10187-400-4.
- Wistrich, Robert (1995). Who's Who in Nazi Germany. New York: Routledge. ISBN 978-0-41511-888-0.
- Zentner, Christian; Bedürftig, Friedemann (1991). The Encyclopedia of the Third Reich. New York: MacMillan Publishing. ISBN 0-02-897500-6.

=== Further reading ===
- Busch, Andreas: Die Geschichte des Autobahnbaus in Deutschland bis 1945. Rockstuhl, Bad Langensalza 2002, ISBN 3-936030-40-5.
- Kroener, Bernhard R., Rolf-Dieter Muller, and Hans Umbreit, eds. Germany and the Second World War: Volume 5: Organization and Mobilization of the German Sphere of Power. Part I: Wartime Administration, Economy, and Manpower Resources, 1939–1941 Oxford University Press, (2000)
- Miller, Michael D.; Schulz, Andreas (2017). Leaders of the Storm Troops. Vol. 2. Solihull, England: Helion & Company. ISBN 978-1-910777-84-8.
- Overy, Richard J. (1988). "Mobilization for Total War in Germany 1939–1941". English Historical Review. 103 (408): 613–639. doi:10.1093/ehr/CIII.CCCCVIII.613. JSTOR 572694.
- Schönleben, Eduard: Fritz Todt, der Mensch, der Ingenieur, der Nationalsozialist. Ein Bericht über Leben und Werk. Gerhard Stalling, Oldenburg 1943.
- Schütz, Erhard, Eckhard Gruber: Mythos Reichsautobahn. 2. Auflage. Links, Berlin 2000, ISBN 3-86153-117-8.
- Seidler, Franz W. Fritz Todt. Baumeister des Dritten Reiches. Ullstein, Frankfurt am Main/Berlin 1988, ISBN 3-548-33095-9.419 pp.
- Taylor, Blaine. Hitler's Engineers: Fritz Todt and Albert Speer-Master Builders of the Third Reich (Casemate Publishers, 2010)
- Tooze, Adam: Ökonomie der Zerstörung. Die Geschichte der Wirtschaft im Nationalsozialismus. Siedler, München 2006 (German 2007), ISBN 978-3-88680-857-1. New edition: Schriftenreihe der Bundeszentrale für politische Bildung, vol. 663, ISBN 978-3-89331-822-3. Wieder: Pantheon, München 2008, ISBN 978-3-570-55056-4.
