= Army Personnel Office (Wehrmacht) =

German military agency

The Army Personnel Office (HPA; Heeres Personal Amt, Heerespersonalamt or Heeres Personalamt) was a German military agency formed in 1920 and charged with the personnel matters of all officers and cadets of the army of the Reichswehr and later the Wehrmacht. With increased recruitment of officers in 1935 and especially in the Second World War, it was given multiple new tasks. The growing demands led to numerous organisational changes. Following the dismissal of Friedrich Hossbach as chief military adjutant to Hitler in 1938 Rudolf Schmundt the then Deputy Chief of the Personnel Department took over as de facto chief military adjutant and continued in this post when he was promoted to Chief of the Army Personnel Office in October 1942. After Schmundt died from injuries received during the assassination attempt on Hitler's life of 20 July 1944, the Deputy Chief of the Personnel Department Wilhelm Burgdorf took over the function and as chief military adjutant to Hitler.

The agency had several departments (Abteilung).

- Abteilung P 1: Planning human resources, personnel management of the officers
- Abteilung P 2: Disciplinary matters of the officers
- Abteilung P 3: Staffing of the General Staff officers; transferred to the central department of the General Staff of the Army in 1935
- Abteilung P 4: Personnel management of the officers of the special careers; was renamed P 3 on 1 April 1939
- Abteilung P 5: Orders and decorations (Orden und Ehrenzeichen) department

== Chiefs of the Heerespersonalamt ==
No.	Portrait	Chief	Took office	Left office	Time in office
1	Johann von Braun [de]	Generalleutnant; Johann von Braun (1867–1938)	7 December 1918	1 April 1922	3 years, 115 days
2	Wilhelm Heye	Generalleutnant; Wilhelm Heye (1869–1947)	1 April 1922	1 October 1923	1 year, 183 days
3	Hermann Reinicke [de]	Generalmajor; Hermann Reinicke (1870–1945)	1 October 1923	1 February 1927	3 years, 123 days
4	Joachim von Stülpnagel [de]	Oberst; Joachim von Stülpnagel (1880–1968)	1 February 1927	1 October 1929	2 years, 242 days
5	Günther von Hammerstein-Equord [de]	Oberst; Günther von Hammerstein-Equord (1877–1965)	1 October 1929	1 November 1930	1 year, 31 days
6	Erich von dem Bussche-Ippenburg [de]	Generalleutnant; Erich von dem Bussche-Ippenburg (1878–1957)	1 November 1930	1 October 1933	2 years, 334 days
7	Viktor von Schwedler	Oberst; Viktor von Schwedler (1885–1954)	1 October 1933	4 February 1938	4 years, 126 days
8	Bodewin Keitel	Generalmajor; Bodewin Keitel (1888–1953)	4 February 1938	1 October 1942	4 years, 239 days
9	Rudolf Schmundt	Generalmajor; Rudolf Schmundt (1896–1944)	1 October 1942	1 October 1944 †	2 years, 0 days
10	Wilhelm Burgdorf	General der Infanterie; Wilhelm Burgdorf (1895–1945)	12 October 1944	2 May 1945 †	202 days

== See also ==
- Chief of the Luftwaffe Personnel Office (Luftwaffe equivalent)
- Chief of the Kriegsmarine Personnel Office (Navy equivalent)
