= Attorney General Hoffman =

Attorney General Hoffman may refer to:

- John Jay Hoffman (born 1965), Acting Attorney General of New Jersey
- Josiah Ogden Hoffman (1766–1837), Attorney General of New York
- Ogden Hoffman (1793–1856), Attorney General of New York

== See also ==
- General Hoffman (disambiguation)
