= 2nd Division (Reichswehr) =

- 2. Division
- Active: 1921–1934
- Disbanded: October 1934
- Country: Weimar Republic
- Branch: Reichsheer
- Type: Infantry
- Size: Division
- Part of: Gruppenkommando 1
- Garrison/HQ: Wehrkreis II: Stettin

Commanders
- Notable commanders: Werner von Fritsch; Fedor von Bock

The 2nd Division was a unit of the Reichswehr.

== Creation ==
In the Order of 31 July 1920 for the Reduction of the Army (to comply with the upper limits on the size of the military contained in the Treaty of Versailles), it was determined that in every Wehrkreis (military district) a division would be established by 1 October 1920. The 2nd Division was formed in January 1921 out of the Reichswehr's 2nd and 9th Brigades, both part of the former Übergangsheer (Transition Army).

It consisted of 3 infantry regiments, the 4th, 5th, and 6th. It also consisted of the 2nd Artillery Regiment, an engineering battalion, a signals battalion, a transportation battalion, and a medical battalion.

The commander of Wehrkreis II was simultaneously the commander of the 2nd Division. For the leadership of the troops, an Infanterieführer and an Artillerieführer were appointed, both subordinated to the commander of the division.

The unit ceased to exist as such after October 1934, and its subordinate units were transferred to one of the 21 new divisions created in that year.

== Organization ==
- 4th Infantry Regiment
- 5th Infantry Regiment
- 6th Infantry Regiment
- 2nd Artillery Regiment
- Pioneer Battalion
- Signals Battalion
- Transportation Battalion
- Medical Battalion

== Divisional commanders ==
- General der Infanterie Erich Weber Pascha (1 October 1920 - 16 June 1921)
- General der Infanterie Hans Freiherr von Hammerstein-Gesmold (16 June 1921 - 1 February 1923)
- General der Infanterie Erich von Tschischwitz (1 February 1923 - 1 February 1927)
- General der Infanterie Joachim vom Amsberg (1 February 1927 - 30 September 1929)
- General der Infanterie Rudolf Schniewindt (1 October 1929 - 30 September 1931)
- Generalleutnant Fedor von Bock (1 October 1931 - 1 April 1935)

=== Infanterieführers ===
- Generalleutnant Waldemar Erfurth (1 October 1929 - 30 September 1931)
- Generalleutnant Wilhelm Ulex (1 August 1935 - 15 October 1935)

=== Artillerieführers ===
- Generalmajor Werner von Fritsch (1 March 1930 - 30 September 1931)

== Garrison ==
The divisional headquarters was in Stettin.

== Notes ==
- Georg Tessin: Deutsche Verbände und Truppen 1918–1939. Biblio Verlag, Osnabrück 1974, ISBN 3-7648-1000-9, S. 189 ff.
