= Rudolf Hofmann =

German general during World War II

- Born: 4 September 1895
- Died: 13 April 1970 (aged 74)
- Military career
- Allegiance: Nazi Germany
- Branch: Army (Wehrmacht)
- Rank: General of the Infantry
- Unit: Army Group North
- Conflicts: World War II
- Awards: Knight's Cross of the Iron Cross

Rudolf Hofmann (4 September 1895 – 13 April 1970) was a German general during World War II and a recipient of Knight's Cross of the Iron Cross. Hoffmann is known for his role in the Pančevo executions. Hoffmann sentenced 36 Serb civilians to death in Pančevo during the Nazi occupation of Yugoslavia. The executions were carried out by members of the German army, with assistance from the Kulturbund and Waffen-SS. Half were executed by hanging while the other half were executed by firing squad.

== Awards and decorations ==
- Knight's Cross of the Iron Cross on 7 May 1945 as General der Infanterie and Chief of the Generalstab Heeresgruppe Nord
