= Karolewo, Kętrzyn County =

Karolewo
- Village
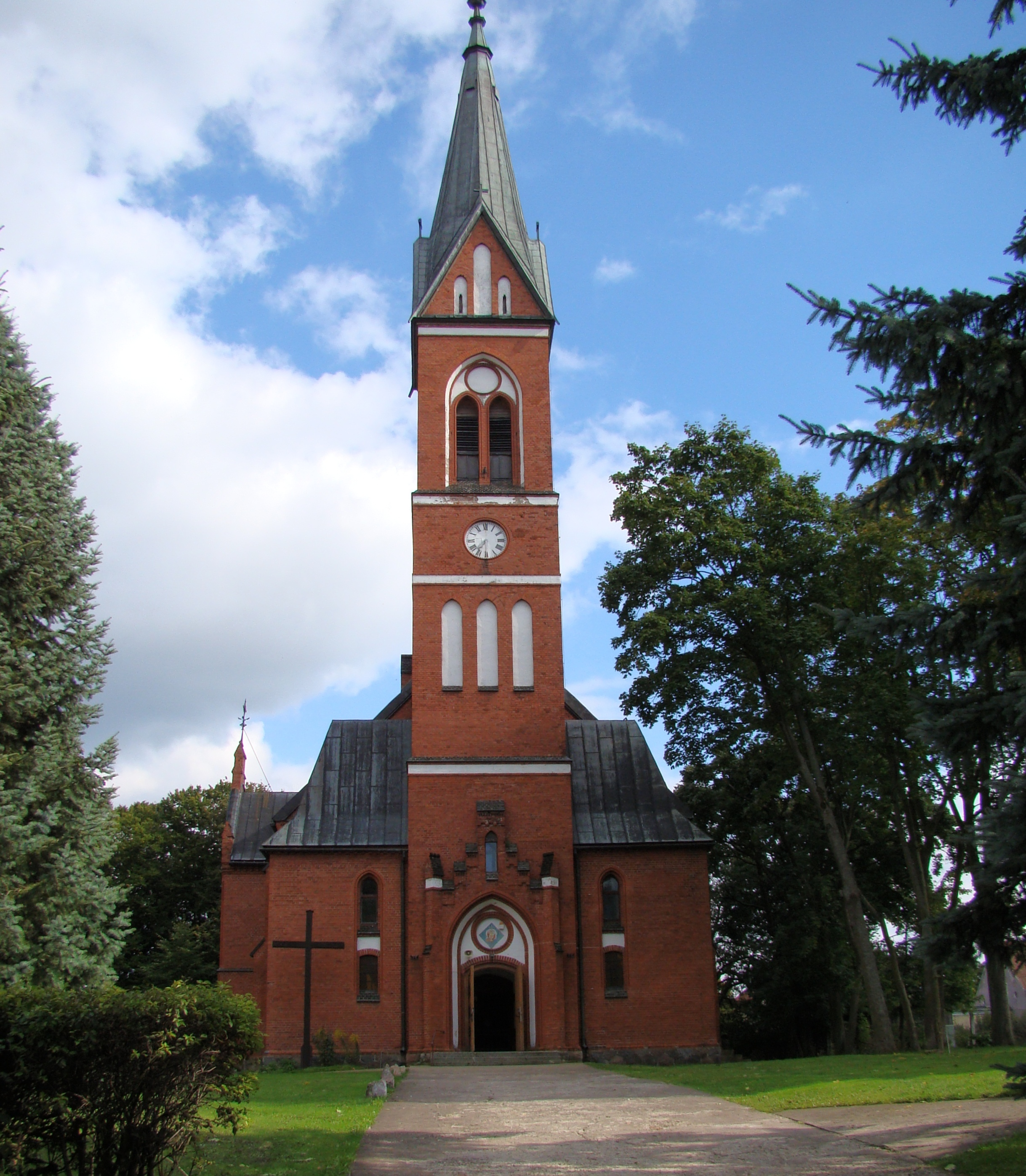

- Location within Poland
- Coordinates: 54°4′N 21°25′E
- Country: Poland
- Voivodeship: Warmian-Masurian
- County: Kętrzyn
- Gmina: Kętrzyn
- Population: 592

Karolewo [karɔˈlɛvɔ] is a village in the administrative district of Gmina Kętrzyn, within Kętrzyn County, Warmian-Masurian Voivodeship, in northern Poland.

The village was the location of the Carlshof Institutions from 1882 to 1940 which served as the Wolfschanze hospital from 1941 to 1945.
