= General of the Infantry (Germany) =

Former German army rank

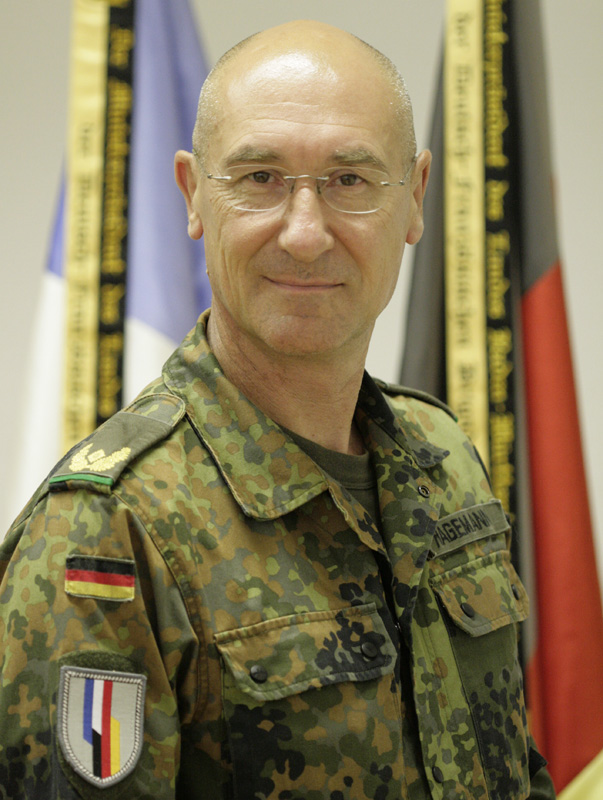
Gert-Johannes Hagemann, General d. Inf. of the Bundeswehr

General of the Infantry (German: General der Infanterie, abbr. General d. Inf.) is a former rank of the German army (Heer). It is currently an appointment or position given to an OF-8 rank officer, who is responsible for particular affairs of training and equipment of the Bundeswehr infantry.

== Former rank in the German ground forces ==
General of the Infantry General der Infanterie
- Arabesque and flecktarn suit insignia

- Army shoulder board
- Country: Nazi Germany
- Service branch: German Army
- Rank: Three-star
- NATO rank code: OF-8
- Non-NATO rank: O-9
- Next higher rank: Generaloberst
- Next lower rank: Generalleutnant
- Equivalent ranks: See list

General of the Infantry was a former rank of General of the branch OF-8 in the German land forces (Imperial Army, Reichswehr and Wehrmacht) and also in the Prussian Army and the Austro-Hungarian Army. It was the third-highest general officer rank, subordinate only to Colonel General and Feldmarschall (Field Marshal). It is equivalent to a three-star rank today. The same rank was adopted by the Finnish Army (Finnish: Jalkaväenkenraali) between the world wars.

German cavalry officers of equivalent rank were called General der Kavallerie and those in the artillery corps were General der Artillerie. In 1935 the Wehrmacht added the ranks of General der Panzertruppe (tank troops), General der Gebirgstruppen (mountain troops), General der Fallschirmtruppen (parachute troops), and General der Nachrichtentruppen (communications troops). In the Luftwaffe, the equivalent rank was General der Flieger. The rank was generally referred to only in the form of General, without specifying the specific forces the bearer commanded.

In the modern German armed forces, the Bundeswehr, the rank of Generalleutnant (Lieutenant General) corresponds to the traditional rank of General der Infanterie. There was no equivalent rank in the army of East Germany, where it was merged into that of Generaloberst.

junior Rank; Generalleutnant	(German officer rank); General der Infanterie	senior Rank; Generaloberst

== General der Infanterie in the Bundeswehr ==
In the Bundeswehr, the position of an infantry officer responsible for certain questions of troop training and equipment, usually with the rank of Brigadier Generals. The position of general of the infantry is connected with that of commander of the infantry school. Corresponding service positions also exist for other branches of the army. Since in this usage it refers to a position not a rank, an Oberst is sometimes "General of" his respective type of troops. The form of address is usually Herr General and/or Herr Oberst; the form of address Herr General der Infanterie is unorthodox, since it does not refer to a rank.

== List of officers who were Generäle der Infanterie ==
Note that a number of these officers may also have gone on to higher ranks during their careers.

=== A ===
- Erich Abraham (1895–1971)
- Viktor Albrecht (1859–1930)
- Karl Allmendinger (1891–1965)
- Constantin von Alvensleben (1809–1892)
- Gustav von Alvensleben (1803–1881)
- Gustav von Arnim (1829–1909)
- Helge Auleb (1887–1964)

=== B ===
- Max von Bahrfeldt (1856–1936)
- Eugen Ritter von Benzino (1856–1915)
- Eugen Beyer (1882–1940)
- Franz Beyer (1892–1968)
- Bruno Bieler (1888–1966)
- Johannes Block (1894–1945)
- Günther Blumentritt (1892–1967)
- Max Bock (1878–1945)
- Herbert von Böckmann (1886–1974)
- Ehrenfried-Oskar Boege (1889–1965)
- Alfred Boehm-Tettelbach (1878–1962)
- Oktavio Philipp von Boehn (1824–1899)
- Kuno-Hans von Both (1884–1955)
- Julius von Bose (1809–1894)
- Hermann von Boyen (1771–1848)
- Hermann von Brandenstein (1868–1942)
- Kurt Brennecke (1891–1982)
- Ludwig Breßler (1862–1955)
- Kurt von Briesen (1886–1941)
- Walter Graf von Brockdorff-Ahlefeldt (1887–1943)
- Heinrich von Bünau (1873–1943)
- Rudolf von Bünau (1890–1962)
- Rudolph Otto von Budritzki (1812–1876)
- Walther Buhle (1894–1959)
- Wilhelm Burgdorf (1895–1945) (committed suicide)
- Erich Buschenhagen (1895–1994)
- Theodor Busse (1897–1986)

=== C ===
- Philipp Carl von Canstein (1804–1877)
- Friedrich-Wilhelm von Chappuis (1886–1942)
- Kurt von der Chevallerie (1891–1945)
- Dietrich von Choltitz (1894–1966)
- Eugen Ritter von Clauß (1862–1942)
- Hermann von Colard (1857–1916)
- Paul von Collas (1841–1910)
- Erich Clössner (1888–1976)

=== D ===
- Ernst Dehner (1889–1970)
- Berthold Karl Adolf von Deimling (1853–1944)
- Friedrich Wilhelm Bülow von Dennewitz (1755–1816)
- Anton Dostler (1891–1945)

=== E ===
- Karl Eibl (1891–1943)
- Otto von Emmich (1848–1915)
- Werner von Erdmannsdorff (1891–1945) (executed)
- Waldemar Erfurth (1879–1971)
- Friedrich Freiherr von Esebeck (1870–1951)
- Ludwig von Estorff (1859–1943) (Char.)

=== F ===
- Alexander von Falkenhausen (1878–1966)
- Erich von Falkenhayn (1861–1922)
- Eduard Vogel von Falckenstein (1797–1885)
- Maximilian Vogel von Falckenstein (1839–1917)
- Friedrich Fangohr (1899–1956)
- Karl von Fasbender (1852–1933)
- Hans Feige (1880–1953)
- Hans-Georg Felber (1889–1962)
- Bernhard Finck von Finckenstein (1863–1945)
- Herbert Fischer (1882–1939)
- Walther Fischer von Weikersthal (1890–1953)
- Wolfgang Fleck (1879–1939)
- Karl Georg Friedrich von Flemming (1705–1767)
- Sigismund von Förster (1887–1959)
- Hermann Foertsch (1895–1961)
- Ernst Freiherr von Forstner (1869–1950)
- Hermann von François (1856–1933)
- Eduard Friedrich Karl von Fransecky (1807–1890)
- Erich Friderici (1885–1964)
- Lothar Fritsch (1871–1951)
- Georg Frotscher (1868–1943)

=== G ===
- Martin Gareis (1891–1976)
- Emil Colerus von Geldern (1856–1919)
- Hubert Gercke (1881–1942)
- Rudolf Gercke (1884–1947)
- Hermann Geyer (1882–1946) (committed suicide)
- Werner-Albrecht Freiherr von und zu Gilsa (1889–1945)
- Edmund Glaise-Horstenau (1882–1946) (committed suicide)
- Gerhard Glokke (1884–1944)
- Bruno Neidhardt von Gneisenau (1811–1889)
- August Karl von Goeben (1816–1880)
- Hans Gollnick (1892–1970)
- Friedrich Gollwitzer (1889–1977)
- Friedrich von Gontard (1860–1942)
- Konrad Ernst von Goßler (1848–1933)
- Walther Graeßner (1891–1943)
- Martin Grase (1891–1963)
- Anton Grasser (1891–1976)
- Kurt von Greiff (1876–1945)
- Hans von Greiffenberg (1893–1951)
- Horst Großmann (1891–1972)
- Julius von Groß (1812–1881)

=== H ===
- Siegfried Haenicke (1878–1946)
- Walther Hahm (1894–1951)
- Hermann Konstantin Albert Julius von Hanneken (1890–1981)
- Alexander von Hartmann (1890–1943)
- Jakob von Hartmann (1795–1873)
- Wilhelm Hasse (1894–1945)
- Arthur Hauffe (1892–1944)
- Friedrich Herrlein (1889–1974)
- Carl Hilpert (1888–1948)
- Otto Hitzfeld (1898–1990)
- Karl Friedrich von Hirschfeld (1747–1818)
- Friedrich Hochbaum (1894–1955)
- Gustav Höhne (1893–1951)
- Walter Hörnlein (1893–1961)
- Rudolf Hofmann (1895–1970)
- Albert von Holleben (1835–1906)
- Friedrich Hoßbach (1894–1980)
- Dietrich von Hülsen-Haeseler (1852–1908)

=== J ===
- Erich Jaschke (1890–1961)
- Hans Jordan (1892–1975)

=== K ===
- Georg von Kameke (1817–1893)
- Friedrich Karmann (1885–1939)
- Hugo von Kathen (1855–1932)
- Bodewin Keitel (1888–1953)
- Werner Kienitz (1885–1959)
- Eberhard Kinzel (1897–1945) (committed suicide)
- Hugo von Kirchbach (1809–1887)
- Baptist Knieß (1885–1956)
- Konstantin Schmidt von Knobelsdorf (1860–1936)
- Friedrich Köchling (1893–1970)
- Albert von Koller (1849–1942)
- Joachim von Kortzfleisch (1890–1945) (killed in action)
- Robert Kosch (1856–1942)
- Hugo von Kottwitz (1815–1897)
- Hans Krebs (1898–1945) (committed suicide)
- Karl Kriebel (1888–1961)
- Ernst-Anton von Krosigk (1898–1945)
- Hermann von Kuhl (1856–1958)
- Arthur Kullmer (1896–1953)
- Ferdinand von Kummer (1816–1900)

=== L ===
- Otto Lasch (1893–1971)
- Paul Laux (1887–1944)
- Leopold von Ledebur (1868–1951)
- Paul Emil von Lettow-Vorbeck (1870–1964)
- Alfred von Lewinski (1831–1906)
- Ernst von Leyser (1889–1962)
- Curt Liebmann (1881–1960)
- Eduard von Liebert (1850–1934)
- Kurt Liese (1882–1945)
- Anton Lipošćak (1863–1924)
- Alfred von Loewenfeld (1848–1927)
- Friedrich "Fritz" Karl von Loßberg (1868–1942)
- Erich Ludendorff (1865–1937)
- Erich Lüdke (1882–1946)
- Hartwig von Ludwiger (1895–1947) (executed)
- Rudolf Lüters (1883–1945)
- Walther von Lüttwitz (1859–1942)

=== M ===
- Albrecht Gustav von Manstein (1805–1877)
- Friedrich Materna (1885–1946)
- Franz Mattenklott (1884–1954)
- Gerhard Matzky (1894–1983)
- Johannes Mayer (1893–1963)
- Friedrich Mieth (1888–1944)
- Arnold Ritter von Möhl (1867–1944)
- Wolfgang Muff (1880–1947)
- Friedrich-Wilhelm Müller (1897–1947)
- Ludwig Müller (1892–1972)

=== N ===
- Oldwig von Natzmer (1782–1861)
- Paul Nethe (1849–1936)
- Ferdinand Neuling (1885–1960)
- August Wilhelm von Neumann-Cosel (1786–1865)
- Günther von Niebelschütz (1882–1945)
- Hermann Niehoff (1897–1980)

=== O ===
- Hans von Obstfelder (1886–1976)
- Friedrich Olbricht (1888–1944) (executed)
- Eugen Ott (1890–1966)

=== P ===
- Ernst Ludwig von Pfuhl (1716–1798)
- Carl Ludwig Wilhelm August von Phull (Pfuel) (1723–1793)
- Friedrich von Phull (1767–1840)
- Ernst von Pfuel (1779–1866)
- Wilhelm Malte I (1783–1854)
- Paul von der Planitz (1837–1902)
- Karl von Plettenberg (1852–1938)
- Paul von Ploetz (1847–1930)
- Helmuth Prieß (1896–1944)
- Karl von Prittwitz (1790–1871)
- Kurt von Pritzelwitz (1854–1935)

=== R ===
- Wilhelm Fürst von Radziwill (1797–1870)
- Siegfried Rasp (1898–1968)
- Albert von Rauch (1829–1901)
- Gustav von Rauch (1774–1841)
- Hermann Recknagel (1892–1945)
- Hermann Reinecke (1888–1973)
- Julius Riemann (1855–1935)
- Enno von Rintelen (1891–1971)
- Edgar Röhricht (1892–1967)
- Karl von Roques (1880–1949)
- Ernst von Rüchel (1754–1823)

=== S ===
- Benignus von Safferling (1824–1899)
- Friedrich August Schack (1892–1968)
- Reinhard von Scheffer-Boyadel (1851–1925)
- Walther Bronsart von Schellendorff (1833–1914)
- Kurt von Schleicher (1882–1934)
- Hans Schmidt (1877–1948)
- Rudolf Schmundt (1896–1944) (Died from injuries resulting from 20 July plot bomb)
- Wilhelm Schneckenburger (1891–1944)
- Rudolf Schniewindt (1875–1954)
- Walther Schroth (1882–1944)
- Friedrich Schulz (1897–1976)
- Albrecht Schubert (1886–1966)
- Felix Schwalbe (1892–1974)
- Viktor von Schwedler (1885–1954)
- Hans Lothar von Schweinitz (1822–1901)
- Adolf Freiherr von Seckendorff (1857–1941)
- Friedrich Siebert (1888–1950)
- Georg von Sodenstern (1889–1955)
- Hans Speth (1897–1985)
- Otto Sponheimer (1886–1961)
- Otto Stapf (1890–1963)
- Johann Baptist Stephan (1808–1875)
- Albrecht Steppuhn (1877–1955)
- Gustav von Stiehle (1823–1899)
- Erich Straube (1887–1971)
- Otto von Strubberg (1821–1908)
- Carl-Heinrich von Stülpnagel (1886–1944) (executed)
- Edwin von Stülpnagel (1876–1933)
- Otto von Stülpnagel (1878–1948)
- Richard von Süßkind-Schwendi (1854–1946)

=== T ===
- Ludwig von der Tann-Rathsamhausen (1815–1881)
- Bogislav Friedrich Emanuel von Tauentzien (1760–1824)
- Hans von Tettau (1888–1956)
- Georg Thomas (1890–1946)
- Helmut Thumm (1895–1977)
- Kurt von Tippelskirch (1891–1957)
- Lothar von Trotha (1848–1920)
- Erich von Tschischwitz (1870–1958)
- Rudolf Toussaint (1891–1968)

=== U ===
- Walter von Unruh (1877–1956)

=== V ===
- Julius von Verdy du Vernois (1832–1910)
- Erwin Vierow (1890–1982)
- Konstantin Bernhard von Voigts-Rhetz (1809–1877)
- Paul Völckers (1891–1946)

=== W ===
- Hugo von Wasielewski (1853–1936)
- Erich Weber (1860–1933)
- Wilhelm Wegener (1895–1944)
- Karl Weisenberger (1890–1952)
- August von Werder (1808–1887)
- Wilhelm Wetzel (1888–1964)
- Friedrich Wiese (1892–1972)
- Gustav Anton von Wietersheim (1884–1974)
- Mauritz von Wiktorin (1883–1956)
- Joachim Witthöft (1887–1966)
- Erwin von Witzleben (1881–1944)
- Otto Wöhler (1894–1987)
- Ludwig Wolff (1893–1968)
- Wilhelm von Woyna (1819–1896)

=== Z ===
- Gustav-Adolf von Zangen (1892–1964)
- Hans Zorn (1891–1943)

== See also ==
- General (Germany)
- Comparative officer ranks of World War II
