= Wilamowo, Kętrzyn County =

Wilamowo
- Village
- Location within Poland
- Coordinates: 54°3′12″N 21°25′45″E
- Country: Poland
- Voivodeship: Warmian-Masurian
- County: Kętrzyn
- Gmina: Kętrzyn
- Population: 10

Wilamowo [vilaˈmɔvɔ] (German: Wilhelmsdorf) is a village in the administrative district of Gmina Kętrzyn, within Kętrzyn County, Warmian-Masurian Voivodeship, in northern Poland.

Until 1934 it belonged to the Carlshof Institutions, during World War II the airfield of the Wolf's Lair, Hitler's headquarter in East Prussia, was located within the village.
