= 50th Infantry Division (German Empire) =

50th Infantry Division (50. Infanterie-Division)
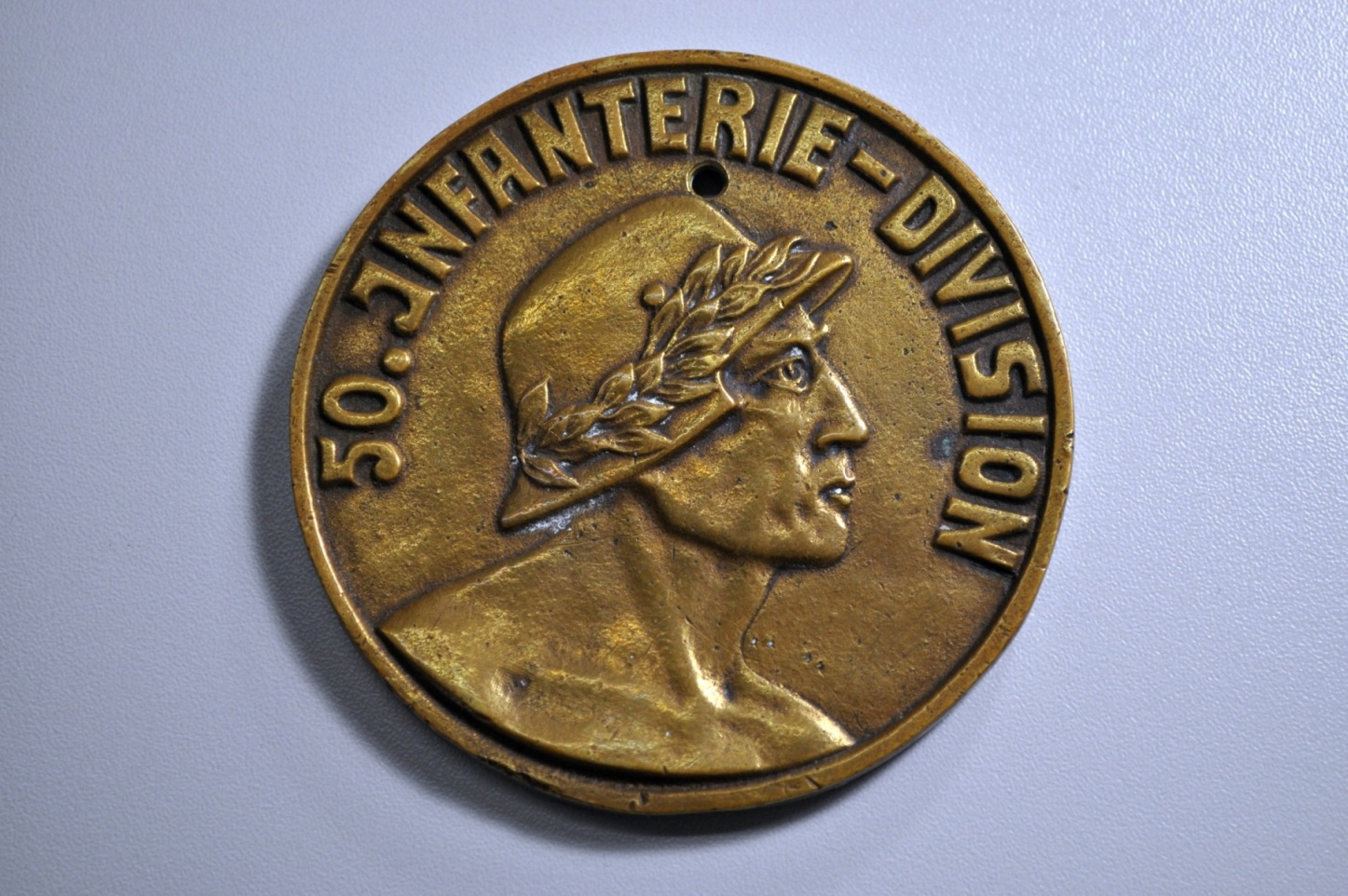
- Commemorative medal
- Active: 10 March 1915 – 1919
- Country: German Empire
- Branch: Imperial German Army
- Type: Infantry
- Size: Approx. 15,000
- Engagements: World War I: Battle of Verdun; Second Battle of the Aisne; German spring offensive

The 50th Infantry Division (50.Infanterie-Division) was a formation of the Prussian Army as part of the Imperial German Army during World War I. The division was formed on March 10, 1915 from units taken from other divisions or newly raised. Its infantry core was from Westphalia: the 39th Lower Rhine Fusilier Regiment, taken from the 14th Reserve Division, the 53rd Westphalian Infantry Regiment, taken from the 14th Infantry Division, and the 158th Lorraine Infantry Regiment, taken from the 13th Infantry Division.

The division saw extensive action in the Battle of Verdun in 1916, especially in the fight for Fort Vaux. The division fought in the Second Battle of the Aisne, also called the Third Battle of Champagne and referred to in German sources as the Dual Battle of Aisne-Champagne (Doppelschlacht Aisne-Champagne). In 1918, it was involved in the German spring offensive, called the Great Battle in France (Große Schlacht in Frankreich) or the Kaiser Battle (Kaiserschlacht) It was rated by Allied intelligence in 1917 and 1918 as a first class assault division.

== Order of battle on March 10, 1915 ==
- 100. Infanterie-Brigade
  - Niederrheinisches Füsilier-Regiment Nr. 39
  - 5. Westfälisches Infanterie-Regiment Nr. 53
  - 7. Lothringisches Infanterie-Regiment Nr. 158
  - Radfahrer-Kompanie Nr. 50
- 50.Feldartillerie-Brigade
  - Feldartillerie-Regiment Nr. 99
  - Feldartillerie-Regiment Nr. 100
  - Fußartillerie-Bataillon Nr. 50
- Pionier-Kompanie Nr. 99
- Pionier-Kompanie Nr. 100

== Late World War I organization ==
The division underwent comparatively fewer organizational changes during the course of the war than most other divisions. The 50th Infantry Division's order of battle on February 22, 1918 was as follows:

- 100. Infanterie-Brigade
  - Niederrheinisches Füsilier-Regiment Nr. 39
  - 5. Westfälisches Infanterie-Regiment Nr. 53
  - 7. Lothringisches Infanterie-Regiment Nr. 158
  - MG-Scharfschützen-Abteilung Nr. 36
- 1.Eskadron/Ulanen-Regiment Hennigs von Treffenfeld (Altmärkisches) Nr. 16
- Artillerie-Kommandeur 50
  - Feldartillerie-Regiment Nr. 99
  - Fußartillerie-Bataillon Nr. 95
- Stab Pionier-Bataillon Nr. 50
  - Pionier-Kompanie Nr. 99
  - Pionier-Kompanie Nr. 100
  - Minenwerfer-Kompanie Nr. 50
- Divisions-Nachrichten-Kommandeur 50
