= Rudolf Schmundt =

Nazi German officer (1896–1944)

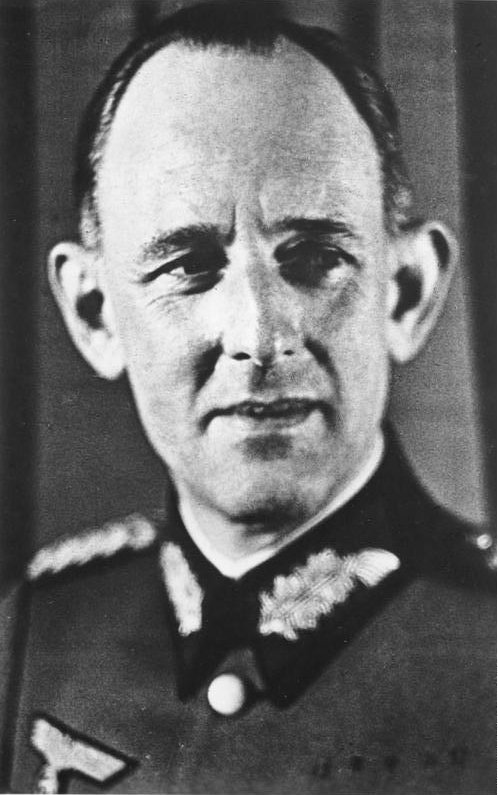
- Born: 13 August 1896; Metz, Alsace-Lorraine, German Empire
- Died: 1 October 1944 (aged 48); Carlshof, Germany
- Burial place: Invalids' Cemetery, Berlin
- Military career
- Allegiance: German Empire; Weimar Republic; Nazi Germany
- Branch: German Army
- Service years: 1914–1944
- Rank: General der Infanterie
- Commands: German Army Personnel Office
- Conflicts: World War I World War II

Rudolf Schmundt (13 August 1896 – 1 October 1944) was a German officer and adjutant to Adolf Hitler. Between 1942 and 1944, he was chief of the German Army Personnel Office. Schmundt was injured during the 20 July 1944 assassination attempt on Hitler and died a few months later from his wounds.

== Biography ==
Schmundt was born in Metz (then in Germany) and served as a lieutenant for the German Army during World War I. In World War II he became the Chief of the Personnel Department of the German Army in October 1942 and later attained the rank of General of the Infantry in 1944.

Throughout the war, Schmundt was one of Adolf Hitler's many adjutants, and flew with Erwin Rommel in early 1941, just before the Afrika Korps was created.

Approximate positions of participants at the conference meeting, Schmundt (7) was standing directly in front of the bomb.

Schmundt was one of the casualties of the failed 20 July plot, planned to kill the German dictator Adolf Hitler. One of the conspirators, Colonel Claus von Stauffenberg, placed a bomb in a briefcase beside Hitler. Colonel Heinz Brandt moved it behind a heavy table leg and unwittingly saved Hitler's life, but as a consequence, he lost his own. Severely injured in the assassination attempt, losing his left eye and suffering shrapnel wounds to both legs, Schmundt initially made a promising recovery, but ultimately died of complications resulting from his injuries on 1 October 1944 at the Carlshof hospital.

Schmundt was posthumously awarded the German Order on 7 October 1944. He was replaced as the Chief of the Personnel Department by General Wilhelm Burgdorf, the deputy chief.

== Decorations ==
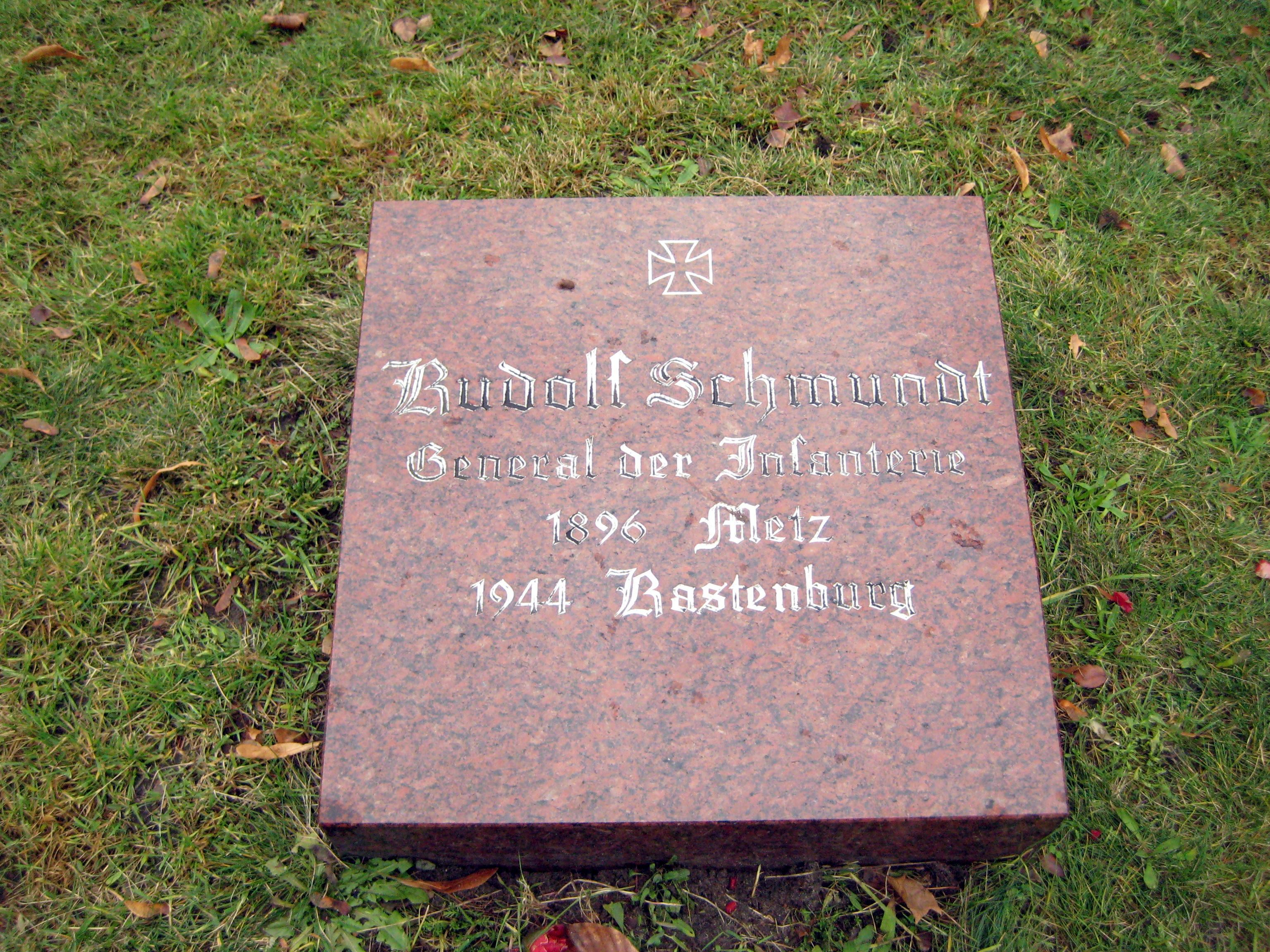
Grave at the Invalidenfriedhof, Berlin

- Iron Cross of 1914, 1st and 2nd class
- Honour Cross of the World War 1914/1918
- Wehrmacht Long Service Award
- Golden Party Badge
- German Order (7 October 1944, posthumously)
- Wound Badge of 20 July (posthumously)

== Bibliography ==
- Angolia, John (1989). For Führer and Fatherland: Political & Civil Awards of the Third Reich. R. James Bender Publishing. ISBN 978-0912138169.
- Hermann Weiß: Biographisches Lexikon zum Dritten Reich, Frankfurt, 2002, p. 411.
- Joachimsthaler, Anton (1999) [1995]. The Last Days of Hitler: The Legends, the Evidence, the Truth. Trans. Helmut Bögler. London: Brockhampton Press. ISBN 978-1-86019-902-8.
- Johannes Hürter: Schmundt, Rudolf. In: Neue Deutsche Biographie (NDB). Band 23, Duncker & Humblot, Berlin 2007, p. 267.
- Reinhard Stumpf: General der Infanterie Rudolf Schmundt; in: Gerd R. Ueberschär (Hrsg.): Hitlers militärische Elite. Vom Kriegsbeginn bis zum Weltkriegsende Bd. 2, Primus Verlag, Darmstadt 1998.
- Snyder, Louis (1994). Encyclopedia of the Third Reich. Da Capo Press. ISBN 978-1-56924-917-8.
- Zentner, Christian; Bedürftig, Friedemann (1997) [1991]. The Encyclopedia of the Third Reich. New York: Da Capo Press. ISBN 978-0-3068079-3-0.
