= Führerreserve =

World War II German military personnel pool

The Führerreserve (“Leaders Reserve” or "Reserve for Leaders") was set up in the German Armed Forces during World War II in 1939 as a pool of temporarily unoccupied high-ranking military officers awaiting new assignments. The various military branches and army groups each had their own pools that they could use as they saw fit. The officers were required to remain at their assigned stations and be available to their superiors but could not exercise any command function, which was in effect equivalent to a temporary retirement while retaining their previous active income. Especially in the second half of the war, more and more politically problematic, troublesome, or militarily incompetent officers were assigned to the Führerreserve.

== Etymology ==
The name does not allude to Adolf Hitler. The first compound, Führer, refers in plural to the members themselves as an officer (the leaders) reserve. Führer in this case is not used possessively to indicate that this was Hitler’s reserve.
