= 306th Infantry Division =

306th Infantry Division: 306. Infanterie-Division
- 306. Infanterie Division Vehicle Insignia
- Active: 15 November 1940 – 9 October 1944
- Disbanded: 9 October 1944
- Country: Nazi Germany
- Branch: Army
- Type: Infantry
- Size: Division
- Garrison/HQ: Hamm
- Engagements: Odessa Offensive

Commanders
- Notable commanders: Carl-Erik Koehler

The 306th Infantry Division (German: 306. Infanterie-Division) was an infantry division of the German Wehrmacht during World War II.

== History ==
The 306th Infantry Division was formed on 15 November 1940 as a static division of the 13th Aufstellungswelle in the Hamm area in Wehrkreis VI. The division's initial recruitment pool came from a third each of the 86th and the 291st Infantry Divisions, as well as the Field Recruit Battalion 129. The initial commander of the 306th Infantry Division was Hans von Sommerfeld.

After deployment was fully completed by May 1941, the 306th Infantry Division served in occupied Belgium until the winter of 1942 to 1943. On 12 March 1942, the division gave parts of its manpower to the newly formed 371st Infantry Division of the 19th Aufstellungswelle. On 17 July 1942, the previously incomplete Artillery Regiment 306 was completed with three additional artillery batteries to prepare for the impending deployment to the Eastern Front. On 21 October 1942, the 306th Infantry Division received orders to be restructured from a static division to an assault division. The restructuring was undertaken in November.

On 1 November 1942, the divisional commander was replaced by Georg Neymann and transported to the Eastern Front later that month. On 2 November 1943, the division fought in the area between Kremenchug and Dnjepropetrovsk on the west bank of the Dnieper and suffered heavy losses. The division was refreshed by the dissolved 328th Infantry Division, receiving from the 328th the Division Group 328, the Fusilier Battalion 328, the 2nd and 4th batteries of Artillery Regiment 328, and the Field Replacement Battalion and logistics troops. Simultaneously, the third battalions of each of the three regiments of the 306th Infantry Division were dissolved to supply the newly formed 353rd Infantry Division.

Over the year of 1943, divisional commanders of the 306th Infantry Division included, among others, Georg Pfeiffer, Theo-Helmut Lieb, and Carl-Erik Koehler. On 4 July 1944, the fourth detachment of Artillery Regiment 306 (officially designated the fourth detachment of Artillery Regiment 328) was replaced by the third detachment of Artillery Regiment 117 from the 111th Infantry Division. On 24 July 1944, the Division Group 328 became the Grenadier Regiment 549.

By April 1944, the division had retreated to the west bank of the Dniester. In August 1944, the division was destroyed on the first day of the Second Jassy–Kishinev offensive, while serving under Army Group South Ukraine. It was formally dissolved on 9 October 1944.

== Organization ==
=== Superior formations ===
Superior formations of the 306 Infantry Division of the German Wehrmacht, 1940–1944
Year	Month	Army Corps	Army	Army Group	Region
1940	December	Replacement Army, in deployment			Wehrkreis VI
1941	January – April	Replacement Army, in deployment			Wehrkreis VI
1941	May – December	XXXVII Army Corps	15th Army	Army Group D	Occupied Belgium
1942	January – May	XXXVII Army Corps	15th Army	Army Group D	Occupied Belgium
1942	June – November	LXXXII Army Corps	15th Army	Army Group D	Occupied Belgium
1942	December	Army Group reserves		Army Group D	Occupied Belgium
1943	January	None	Hollidt	Army Group Don	Don
1943	February	XVII Army Corps	Hollidt	Army Group Don	Don
1943	March	XVII Army Corps	Hollidt	Army Group South	Don
1943	April – September	XVII Army Corps	6th Army	Army Group South	Mius
1943	October – December	XVII Army Corps	1st Panzer Army	Army Group South	Nikopol
1944	January – February	XXX Army Corps	6th Army	Army Group South	Nikopol
1944	March	XVII Army Corps	6th Army	Army Group A	Mykolaiv
1944	April – July	XXX Army Corps	6th Army	Army Group South Ukraine	Chișinău
1944	August	XXIX Army Corps	6th Army	Army Group South Ukraine	Transylvania

=== Subordinate formations ===
At the point of formation in late 1940, the 306th Infantry Division consisted of the following parts:

- Infantry Regiment 579 (three battalions). (Note: Staff formed from the staff of Infantry Regiment 216 (formerly 86th Infantry Division), 1st and 3rd battalions from the 3rd battalion of that same regiment, 2nd battalion formed from the 3rd battalion of Infantry Regiment 506 (formerly 291st Infantry Division).)
- Infantry Regiment 580 (three battalions). (Note: 1st battalion from the 1st battalion of Infantry Regiment 504 (formerly 291st Infantry Division, previously the 2nd battalion of Infantry Regiment 44 (Heilsberg)), 3rd battalion from the 3rd battalion of Infantry Regiment 167 (formerly 86th Infantry Division), 2nd battalion from the Field Recruit Battalion 129.)
- Infantry Regiment 581 (three battalions). (Note: Parts of the 1st through 3rd battalions from parts the 1st battalion of Infantry Regiment 505 (formerly 291st Infantry Division, previously the 2nd battalion of Infantry Regiment 45 (Marienwerder)). Parts of the 1st and 3rd battalions from the 3rd battalion of Infantry Regiment 184 (86th Infantry Division).)
- Artillery Regiment 306 (three detachments). (Note: Formed from the regimental staff of Artillery Regiment 186 (formerly 86th Infantry Division), the 3rd detachment of Artillery Regiment 391 (formerly 291st Infantry Division), and four additional batteries.)

In late 1943, the division was restructured into a Type 1944 Infantry Division (German: Division neuer Art 44). After this restructuring, it consisted of the following parts:

- Grenadier Regiment 579 (two battalions).
- Grenadier Regiment 580 (two battalions).
- Division Group 328 with Regiment Groups 548 and 549.
  - Division Group 328. (Note: From 24 July 1944: Grenadier Regiment 549.)
  - Regiment Group 548.
  - Regiment Group 549.
- Division Fusilier Battalion 328. (Note: Renamed Division Fusilier Battalion 306 on 20 March 1944.)
- Artillery Regiment 306 (four detachments). (Note: 2nd and 4th detachments officially part of Artillery Regiment 328, but effectively subordinate to Artillery Regiment 306.)

== Divisional commanders ==
- Hans von Sommerfeld, divisional commander of the 306th Infantry Division (15 November 1940 – 1 November 1942).
- Georg Neymann, divisional commander of the 306th Infantry Division (1 November 1942 – November 1942).
- Gerhard Matthias, divisional commander of the 306th Infantry Division (November 1942 – 29 January 1943).
- Georg Pfeiffer, divisional commander of the 306th Infantry Division (29 January 1943 – 21 February 1943).
- Theo-Helmut Lieb, divisional commander of the 306th Infantry Division (21 February 1943 – 30 March 1943).
- Carl-Erik Koehler, divisional commander of the 306th Infantry Division (30 March 1943 – 1 January 1944).
- Karl Baer, divisional commander of the 306th Infantry Division (1 January 1944 – 13 January 1944).
- Carl-Erik Koehler, divisional commander of the 306th Infantry Division (13 January 1944 – 20 April 1944).
