= 6th Rocket Brigade =

- Active: 1962–1998
- Country: Soviet Union (1962–1991); Russia (1992–1998)
- Branch: Soviet Army (1962–1991); Russian Ground Forces (1992–1998)
- Type: Tactical Ballistic Missile Brigade
- Part of: 6th Army
- Garrison/HQ: Pinozero

The 6th Rocket Brigade was a Tactical ballistic missile brigade of the Soviet Army. The brigade was activated in 1962 with the 6th Army and disbanded in 1998.

== History ==
The 6th Missile Brigade was activated in 1962 at Pinozero with the 6th Army. It included three separate missile battalions and a technical battery. It was equipped with R-11 Zemlya (SS-1B Scud A) tactical ballistic missiles. In December 1991, the brigade received newer OTR-21 Tochka tactical ballistic missiles. The brigade was disbanded in 1998.
