= Theo-Helmut Lieb =

German WW2 Army general (1889-1981)

- Born: 25 November 1889; Freudenstadt, Kingdom of Württemberg, German Empire
- Died: 20 March 1981 (aged 91); Freudenstadt, Baden-Württemberg, West Germany
- Military career
- Allegiance: German Empire (to 1918); Weimar Republic (to 1933); Nazi Germany
- Branch: Imperial German Army; Reichswehr; Army (Wehrmacht)
- Service years: 1910–1945
- Rank: Generalleutnant
- Commands: 306th Infantry Division; 112th Infantry Division; XXXXII Army Corps; 34th Infantry Division
- Conflicts: World War I World War II
- Awards: Knight's Cross of the Iron Cross with Oak Leaves

Theo-Helmut Lieb (25 November 1889 – 20 March 1981) was a general in the Wehrmacht of Nazi Germany who held several divisional commands during World War II. He was a recipient of the Knight's Cross of the Iron Cross with Oak Leaves.

Lieb was born at Freudenstadt in the Kingdom of Württemberg in 1889. He entered the Imperial German Army in 1910 and fought in World War I. At the end of the war, he was an Hauptmann on the general staff of the 240th Infantry Division. He remained in the post-war Reichswehr as a career officer, serving as a commander of anti-tank forces from 1936 to 1938. He next commanded Infantry Regiment 27 from 1938 to 1940. He was the military commander of Wuppertal and Frankfurt for the next few years. He then led the 112th and 34th infantry divisions.

== Awards and decorations ==
- Iron Cross (1914)
  - 2nd Class (19 September 1914)
  - 1st Class (22 August 1915)
- Knight's Cross of the Württemberg Military Merit Order
- Knight's Cross 2nd class with swords of the Friedrich Order
- Hanseatic Cross of Hamburg
- Military Merit Cross of Austria-Hungary, 3rd class with war decoration
- Wound Badge in black
- Honour Cross of the World War 1914/1918
- Iron Cross (1939)
  - 2nd Class
  - 1st Class
- Knight's Cross of the Iron Cross with Oak Leaves
  - Knight's Cross on 7 February 1944 as Generalleutnant and commander of XXXXII. Armeekorps
  - 400th Oak Leaves on 18 February 1944 as Generalleutnant and commander of XXXXII. Armeekorps

Military offices
Preceded by General der Artillerie Georg Pfeiffer	Commander of 306. Infanterie-Division; 21 February 1943 – 30 March 1943	Succeeded by General der Kavallerie Carl-Erik Koehler
Preceded by General der Artillerie Rolf Wuthmann	Commander of 112. Infanterie-Division; 3 September 1943 – 1 February 1944	Succeeded by None
Preceded by General der Infanterie Friedrich Hochbaum	Commander of 34. Infanterie-Division; 31 May 1944 – May 1945	Succeeded by Oberst Ferdinand Hippel
