= Hans von Ahlfen =

German general (1897–1966)

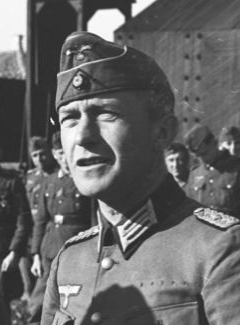
- Hans von Ahlfen in 1942
- Born: 20 February 1897; Berlin, Province of Brandenburg, Kingdom of Prussia, German Empire
- Died: 11 September 1966 (aged 69); Oberndorf am Neckar, Baden-Württemberg, West Germany
- Military career
- Allegiance: German Empire; Weimar Republic; Nazi Germany
- Branch: Imperial German Army; Reichsheer; German Army
- Rank: Generalmajor
- Commands: Breslau Fortress
- Conflicts: World War I; World War II
- Other work: Military writer

Hans Heinrich August von Ahlfen (20 February 1897 – 11 September 1966) was a general in the German Army in the Second World War. He was the commandant of 'Fortress Breslau' at the beginning of the siege of the city in early 1945, but was dismissed by Hitler because of strategic differences.

== Life ==
Ahlfen was born in Berlin and joined the army in October 1914 as an officer cadet. He served in the First World War as a lieutenant in an engineer battalion and as a commander of armoured trains. Between the wars he was retained in the Reichswehr, serving mostly with the 2nd Pioneer Battalion before becoming an instructor at the Military Academy in August 1935. His military textbook, Service with the Pioneers, was published in 1937.

=== Second World War ===
At the outbreak of the Second World War, Ahlfen was a lieutenant colonel in the army. He was given command of a motorised pioneer battalion, serving on the eastern front and later in Norway.

On 30 January 1945, Ahlfen was promoted to major general and appointed by Field Marshal Ferdinand Schörner as the commandant of the city of Breslau which Adolf Hitler had declared in August 1944 to be a ‘fortress’, to be defended at all costs. He was soon in conflict with the Gauleiter of the city Karl Hanke who had been declared Breslau’s “battle commander” by Hitler. Hanke advocated a breakout using parachute troops which Ahlfen did not consider realistic and he disagreed with him on several other issues, including the construction of an auxiliary airstrip that would be less vulnerable to attack. On the orders of Schörner and at the instigation of Hanke he was replaced as commandant by General of the Infantry Hermann Niehoff on 5 March 1945. Great loss of life and destruction then followed during the Siege of Breslau as Soviet forces sought to capture the city which held out for two months defended partly by elderly Volkssturm home guard and boys from the Hitler Youth, with little defence against air attacks.

=== Postwar author ===
Von Ahlfen was captured by the Western Allies on 17 April 1945 whilst serving with Army Group B as General of Pioneers and was released from captivity on 30 June 1947. He then wrote The battle of the fortress Breslau (published by Ernst Siegfried mediator, 1957). In the next few years, he worked with Hermann Niehoff, his successor as the commander of Fortress Breslau on this topic. In 1959, they jointly published the book So fought Breslau (Graefe and Unzer Verlag, 1959), which was a big commercial success, and a year later, a second expanded edition followed. In Battle for Silesia (Graefe and Unzer Verlag, 1961), Ahlfen considered the wider conflict in 1945.

== Death ==
Generalmajor (Ret.) von Ahlfen died in Oberndorf am Neckar aged 69 in 1966.

== Awards and decorations ==
- Iron Cross (1914) 2nd and 1st Class
  - 2nd Class on 23 December 1914
  - 1st Class on 16 April 1918
- Austrian Military Merit Cross, 3rd Class with the War Decoration (ÖM3K) on 3 April 1916
- Wound Badge (1918) in Black on 16 May 1918
- Order of the Cross of Liberty, 3rd Class with Swords on 27 May 1918
- Commemorative Medal of the Finish War of Liberation 1918 on 3 July 1919
- Honour Cross of the World War 1914/1918 with Swords
- Wehrmacht Long Service Award, 4th to 1st Class
  - 2nd Class on 2 October 1936
  - 1st Class on 17 August 1939
- Repetition Clasp 1939 to the Iron Cross 1914, 2nd and 1st Class
  - 2nd Class on 24 April 1941
  - 1st Class on 10 May 1941
- Order of the Star of Romania, Commander with Swords on the ribbon of the Order of Military Virtue on 18 August 1941
- Bulgarian Military Order for Bravery, 3rd Grade, I. Class on 18 December 1941
- Crimea Shield
- Winter Battle in the East 1941–42 Medal on 19 August 1942

== Sources ==
- German Federal Archives: BArch PERS 6/1035 and PERS 6/299309
