= Nurmalitsy (air base) =

- IATA: none; ICAO: XLPN

Summary
- Airport type: Military
- Operator: Soviet Ground Forces
- Location: Olonets, Republic of Karelia, Russia
- Elevation AMSL: 105 ft / 32 m
- Coordinates: 61°2′42″N 032°58′42″E

Map
- Location in Olonetsky District, Republic of Karelia Nurmalitsy (Russia) Nurmalitsy (Europe)

Runways
| Direction | Length | | Surface |
| Direction | ft | m | Surface |
|---|---|---|---|
| 14/32 | 6,069 | 1,850 |

Nurmalitsy is a former airfield of the Army Aviation of the Soviet Ground Forces. It was located 8 km north of Olonec in the Republic of Karelia, Russia. It appears to have been constructed during World War II.

It was home to the 88th Independent Helicopter Squadron of the 6th Combined Arms Army, Leningrad Military District, from 1967 to 1977.

It was shown on the 1974 Department of Defense Global Navigation Chart No. 3 as having jet facilities. It is now bulldozed to the ground.
