= Carl-Erik Koehler =

WW2 German Army general (1895-1958)

- Born: 3 December 1895; Mannheim, German Empire
- Died: 8 December 1958 (aged 63); Rheine, West Germany
- Military career
- Allegiance: German Empire (to 1918); Weimar Republic (to 1933); Nazi Germany (to 1945)
- Branch: Imperial German Army; Reichswehr; Army (Wehrmacht)
- Service years: 1914–1945
- Rank: General of the Cavalry
- Commands: 306. Infanterie-Division; XXXIII. Armeekorps; XX. Armeekorps
- Conflicts: World War I; World War II; Annexation of the Sudetenland; Lower Dnieper Offensive; Dnieper–Carpathian Offensive; Battle of Halbe
- Awards: Knight's Cross of the Iron Cross

Carl-Erik Koehler (3 December 1895 – 8 December 1958) was a German general during World War II. He was a recipient of the Knight's Cross of the Iron Cross of Nazi Germany.

Koehler was born at Mannheim in the Grand Duchy of Baden in 1895. He entered the Imperial German Army at the start of World War I and served throughout that conflict. At the end of the war, he was a Leutnant and the adjutant of the 11th Uhlan Regiment. He remained in the post-war Reichswehr as a career officer. He was the chief of operations in the 4th Infantry Division between 1935 and 1938, then a staff officer in OKH until 1941. During World War II, he became the chief of staff of the Replacement Army until 1943. He commanded the 306th Infantry Division until April 1944 and the XXXIII Army Corps in occupied Norway until April 1945.

== Awards and decorations ==
- Iron Cross (1914)
  - 2nd class
  - 1st class
- Hanseatic Cross of Hamburg
- Knight's Cross, 2nd class, of the Order of the Zähringer Lion
- Wound Badge in black
- Honour Cross of the World War 1914/1918
- Iron Cross (1939)
  - 2nd Class
  - 1st Class
- War Merit Cross, 1st and 2nd class with swords
- German Cross in Gold (4 February 1944)
- Knight's Cross of the Iron Cross on 4 May 1944 as Generalleutnant and commander of 306. Infanterie-Division

Military offices
Preceded by Generalleutnant Theobald Lieb	Commander of 306. Infanterie-Division; 30 March 1943 – 1 January 1944	Succeeded by Generalmajor Karl Baer
Preceded by Generalmajor Karl Baer	Commander of 306. Infanterie-Division; 12 January 1944 – 20 April 1944	Succeeded by None
Preceded by Generalleutnant Bruno Bräuer	Acting Commander of Fortress Crete; 8 April 1944 – 20 April 1944	Succeeded by Generalleutnant Bruno Bräuer
Preceded by General der Infanterie Ludwig Wolff	Commander of XXXIII. Armeekorps; 10 August 1944 – 31 March 1945	Succeeded by Generalmajor Friedrich von Unger
Preceded by General der Artillerie Rudolf Freiherr von Roman	Commander of XX. Armeekorps; 1 April 1945 – May 1945	Succeeded by None
