= SS Fortress Regiment 1 =

Improvised unit of the Waffen-SS

- Active: 1945
- Country: Nazi Germany
- Branch: Waffen-SS
- Size: Regiment
- Engagements: World War II: Siege of Breslau

Commanders
- Notable commanders: Georg-Robert Besslein

SS Fortress Regiment 1 (German: SS-Festungs-Regiment 1) was an improvised unit of the Waffen SS formed in February 1945, during World War II, for service in the defence of the German city of Breslau, during the Red Army's Siege of Breslau. The regiment engaged in savage house to house fighting against the invading Red Army that lasted 82 days but surrendered at the end of the siege on 6 May 1945.

== Commander ==
SS-Obersturmbannführer Georg-Robert Besslein
