= Gustav Jonson =

Estonian military personnel

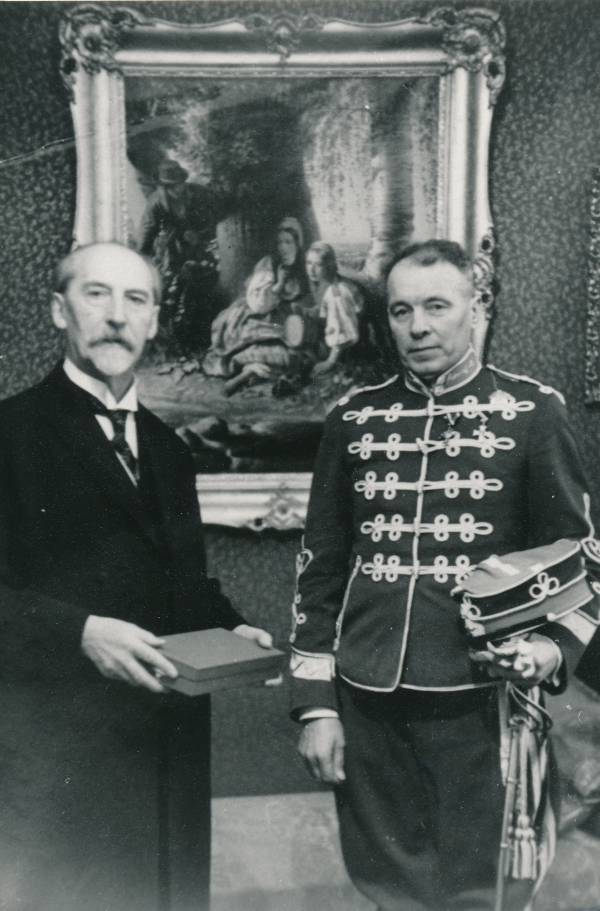
- Jaan Tõnisson (left) and Gustav Jonson (right) in 1938

Commander of the Estonian Army
- In office 22 June 1940 – 3 September 1940
- President: Konstantin Päts
- Preceded by: Johan Laidoner
- Succeeded by: Vacant

Commander of the Estonian People's Army
- In office 3 September 1940 – 6 June 1941
- Leader: Joseph Stalin
- Preceded by: Office created
- Succeeded by: Office abolished

Personal details
- Born: Gustav Joonson; 7 January 1880 Fellin, Russian Empire, (now Viljandi Parish, Estonia)
- Died: 15 November 1942 (aged 62) Chelyabinsk, Russian SFSR, Soviet Union

Military service
- Allegiance: Russian Empire (1901–1917); Estonia (1917–1940); Soviet Union (1940–1942)
- Branch: Imperial Russian Army; Estonian Army; Red Army
- Years of service: 1901–1942
- Rank: (Russian Empire) Staff Officer (Estonia) Generalmajor (Soviet Union) Lieutenant General
- Commands: 1st Cavalry Regiment; 22nd Estonian Territorial Rifle Corps
- Battles/wars: World War I; Russian Civil War; Estonian War of Independence; World War II; Operation Barbarossa

Gustav Jonson (born Gustav Joonson; 7 January 1880 – 15 November 1942) was an Estonian military soldier of the Russian Empire, Estonia, and the Soviet Union.

== Biography ==
Gustav Jonson was born Gustav Joonson to Jüri and Mari Joonson (née Adamson) at Kudu farm, Päri Parish (now in present-day Viljandi Parish). In 1914 he graduated from Riga Polytechnical Institute. He participated in World War I. In 1917 he returned to Estonia, and he formed the 1st Cavalry Regiment. The regiment participated in the Estonian War of Independence. From 1918 to 1924 he was the commander of the 1st Cavalry Regiment. From 1927 to 1928 he was the head of Estonian Military Academy. From 1934 to 1939 he was the assistant officer (Estonian: käsundusohvitser) of the state elder Konstantin Päts.

In 1939, the then 59-year-old Jonson resigned from active service with the rank of Major General due to exceeding the age limit. After the Stalinist Soviet invasion and occupation of Estonia on 16–17 June 1940, a few days later Jonson was reinstated to service and appointed Commander of the Estonian Army to replace the previous Commander-in-Chief Johan Laidoner who had been forced to resign by the Soviet authorities.

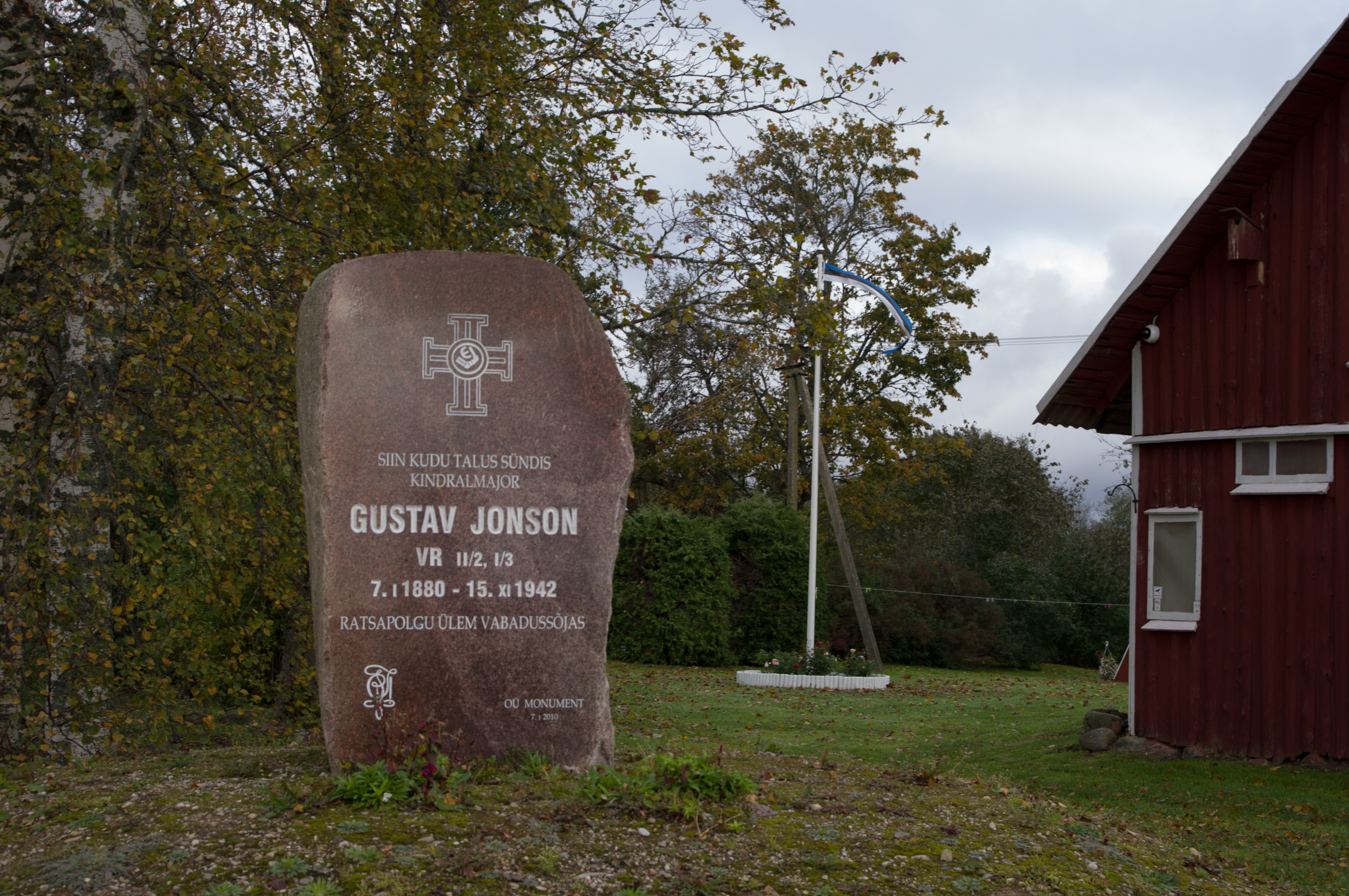
Memorial to Jonson at Kudu farm in Viljandi County, Jonson's birthplace.

Jonson formally remained commander of the armed formation after it was renamed the "Soviet Estonian People's Army", and then also after it became part of the Soviet Red Army' (as the "22nd Estonian Territorial Rifle Corps"). In that capacity he was promoted in February 1941 to Lieutenant General of the Red Army.

At the beginning of June 1941, the Stalin released all Estonian generals from the command of the "Estonian Territorial Rifle Corps". On 13 June 1941, Jonson was sent to the General Staff Academy in Moscow, where the Soviet authorities arrested him on 19 July 1941. On 15 May 1942, Jonson was sentenced to death. Jonson was executed in Chelyabinsk, Soviet Russia on 15 November 1942.

== Awards ==
=== Russian Empire ===
- (Russian Empire) Recipient of the Saint George Sword, 1917.
- (Russian Empire) Knight 3rd Class Order of Saint Anna,
- (Russian Empire) Knight 2nd Class Order of Saint Anna,
- (Russian Empire) Knight of the Order of St. Stanislaus,
- (Russian Empire) Knight Commander of the Order of St. Stanislaus,

=== Estonia ===
- (Estonia) Knight of the Cross of Liberty I Grade, 3rd Class, 1920.
- (Estonia) Knight of the Cross of Liberty II Grade, 2nd Class, 1920.
- (Estonia) Knight 1st Class Order of the Cross of the Eagle, 1933.
- (Estonia) Knight 1st Class Order of the Estonian Red Cross, 1934.

=== Soviet Union ===
- (Soviet Union) Recipient of the Order of the Red Banner,

=== Foreign ===
- (Latvia) Knight 3rd Class of the Latvian Order of Lāčplēsis, 1924.
- (Latvia) Grand Officer of the Latvian Order of the Three Stars,
- (Poland) Officer's Cross of the Polish Order of Polonia Restituta,
- (Sweden) Commander of the Swedish Order of the Sword, 1st class 1932.
- Commander Grand Cross of the Swedish Order of the Polar Star, (1936)
- (Finland) Commander of the Finnish Order of the White Rose,
