= Hermann Niehoff =

German army general (1897-1980)

- Born: 3 April 1897; Papenburg, Province of Hanover, Kingdom of Prussia, German Empire
- Died: 5 November 1980 (aged 83); Riegsee, Bavaria, West Germany
- Military career
- Allegiance: German Empire Weimar Republic Nazi Germany
- Branch: German Army
- Service years: 1915–1945
- Rank: General der Infanterie
- Conflicts: World War I World War II: Siege of Breslau (POW)
- Awards: Knight's Cross of the Iron Cross with Oak Leaves

Hermann Niehoff (3 April 1897 – 5 November 1980) was a German general during World War II. In 1944, he was a lieutenant general and commander of Heeresgebiet Sudfrankreich (Army Group Southern France) facing the US/French invasion of southern France (Operation Dragoon). From 2 March 1945, he was the garrison commander of Fortress Breslau (Festung Breslau) during the Battle of Breslau, which he surrendered to the Soviet 6th Army on 6 May 1945.

== Awards ==
- Iron Cross (1914) 2nd Class (5 August 1916) & 1st Class (12 June 1918)
- Wound Badge in Black
- Hanseatic Cross of Hamburg
- Honour Cross of the World War 1914/1918
- Clasp to the Iron Cross (1939) 2nd Class (26 June 1940) & 1st Class (7 July 1941)
- Honour Roll Clasp of the Army (29 September 1941)
- Infantry Assault Badge
- German Cross in Gold on 6 January 1942 as Oberstleutnant in Infanterie-Regiment 464
- Knight's Cross of the Iron Cross with Oak Leaves and Swords
  - Knight's Cross on 15 June 1944 as Generalleutnant and commander of the 371. Infanterie-Division
  - 764th Oak Leaves on 5 March 1945 as Generalleutnant and commander of the 371. Infanterie-Division

Niehoff was nominated for Swords in 1945 as commander of Breslau. No evidence of the award can be found in the German Federal Archives. The Association of Knight's Cross Recipients (AKCR) only assumes that the Swords were awarded. According to Niehoff's testimony he was nominated by Gauleiter Karl Hanke.

Military offices
Preceded by Generalleutnant Richard Stempel	Commander of 371. Infanterie-Division; 1 April 1943 – 10 June 1944	Succeeded by Generalmajor Hans-Joachim Baurmeister
Preceded by Generalmajor Hans-Joachim Baurmeister	Commander of 371. Infanterie-Division; 10 July 1944 – 2 March 1945	Succeeded by Generalmajor Rolf Scherenberg
