= Alfred Gause =

German Generalleutnant during World War II (1896-1967)

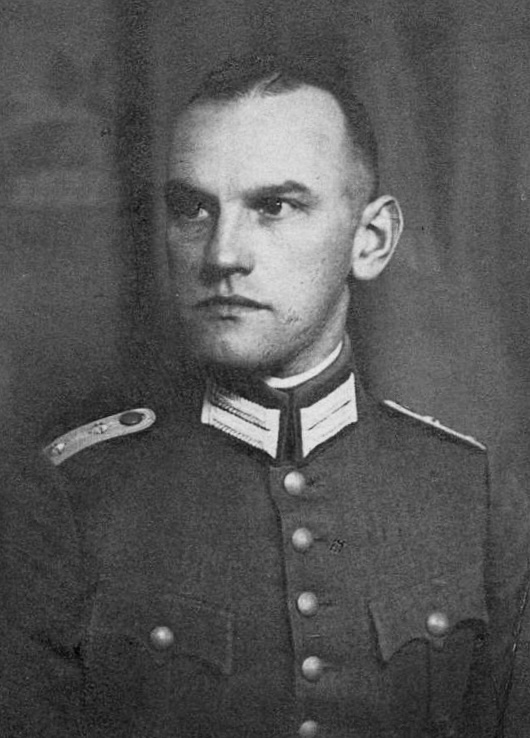
- Gause in 1922
- Born: Ernst Max Alfred Gause; 14 February 1896; Königsberg, Prussia
- Died: 30 September 1967 (aged 71); Bonn, Germany
- Spouse: Elisabeth Geres (m. 1927)
- Children: Gisela Gause
- Relatives: Fritz Gause
- Military career
- Allegiance: German Empire; Weimar Republic; Nazi Germany
- Branch: German Army
- Service years: 1914–1945
- Rank: Generalleutnant
- Commands: LXVII Army Corps; II Army Corps
- Conflicts: World War I; World War II; Anschluss; Occupation of Czechoslovakia; Battle of France; North African Campaign; Western Desert Campaign; Operation Torch; Tunisia Campaign; Italian Campaign; Courland Pocket
- Awards: Knight's Cross of the Iron Cross

Signature
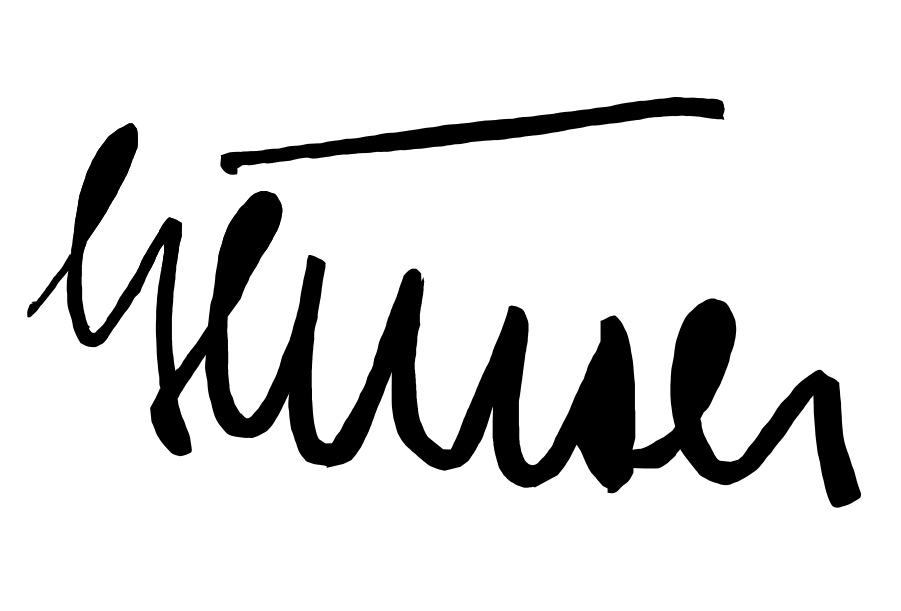

Ernst Max Alfred Gause (14 February 1896 – 30 September 1967) was a German Generalleutnant during World War II. He had served under prominent commanders as Erwin Rommel and Albert Kesselring.

== Early life and career ==
Gause was the younger brother of Fritz Gause. Entering army service on 14 March 1914, he served as Fahnenjunker in the 18th Pioneer-battalion throughout the First World War, and was awarded both the Iron Cross, both Second and First Class. Gause's unit marched with the 1st Army and mostly participated on the Western Front, including engagements in the Battle of Verdun from 21 February to 18 July 1916 and battle near Soissons and Reims from 18 to 25 April 1918, continued with operations in Veste and the last movement on 10 October 1918.

He was first promoted Fähnrich on 5 October 1914, and to Leutnant on 3 January 1915. In the first six months of 1918 he was detached to the infantry-school Lockstedter Lager and pioneer-school I at Jemmont. He became battalion adjutant on 9 October and was promoted to Oberleutnant on 18 October.

== Interwar ==
In the interwar years, he was among the 4,000 officers selected to remain in the Reichswehr, the restricted-sized German army. He served on the staff of the 1st Engineer battalion. It was followed by a tour of duty with the staff of the 1st Infantry division in 1921, which was also headquartered in his hometown Königsberg. In 1922 he was then sent back to the 1st Engineers until 1925, where he was transferred and spent a year in the 1st artillery regiment. He and his wife had their first and only daughter, Gisela, on 31 May 1925.

On 1 November 1927, he was promoted to Hauptmann and named the commander of the 2nd company and welfare-officer of the 1st pioneer battalion, in which he served until 1 October 1930 when transferred into the 16th mounted-regiment while detached to the chief of the Troop Office due to his earlier high performance in the Wehrkreis exam and was selected as a candidate for the General Staff.

Gause spent the next four years in Stuttgart after granted admission into the General Staff and posted to the staff of the 5th Division, and from 1 October 1934 to 15 October 1935 was the staff of Wehrkreis V. He then became the chief of operations (Ia) of the V Army Corps after Germany's rearmament, commanded by Hermann Geyer. Gause was promoted to Major on 1 May 1934, shortly later to Oberstleutnant on 1 October 1936, and finally to Oberst on 1 April 1939.

Colonel Gause was assigned to the Armed Forces Office of the War Ministry in October 1937, and later the Oberkommando der Wehrmacht after its reformation in February 1938. He worked under Alfred Jodl, was one of the officers constructing contacts and security within the new high command system. In 1938, he had participated in the planning and management for the annexation of the Sudetenland and Austria in Anschluss.

== Second World War ==
During the Second World War he was a highly valued staff officer, which according to Alfred Jodl was characterized with “outstanding leadership qualities, suitable for department.” Gause was named chief of staff of X Army Corps under the command of Lieutenant General Christian Hansen, participating in the movement from Warsaw to the Lower Rhine, continued the conquest of Belgium and France in 1940. After the fall of Paris, Gause was placed in the chief of the Demobilization Branch in the Oberkommando des Heeres (OKH) to demobilize the old and redundant Landwehr units. He worked closely with Franz Halder, the chief of the General Staff, who later appointed him as the liaison officer to coordinate with the Italians.

While Germany was planning to invade Britain in Operation Sea-lion, Gause served as the chief of staff of XXXVIII Army Corps, then commanded by Erich von Manstein, from 1 October 1940 to the end of 30 January 1941. He privately discounted the plan as unlikely to succeed, that in spite of Göring’s optimism on air support, the Kriegsmarine was unable to defeat the powerful British Navy and would only result in “complete destruction.”

=== North Africa ===
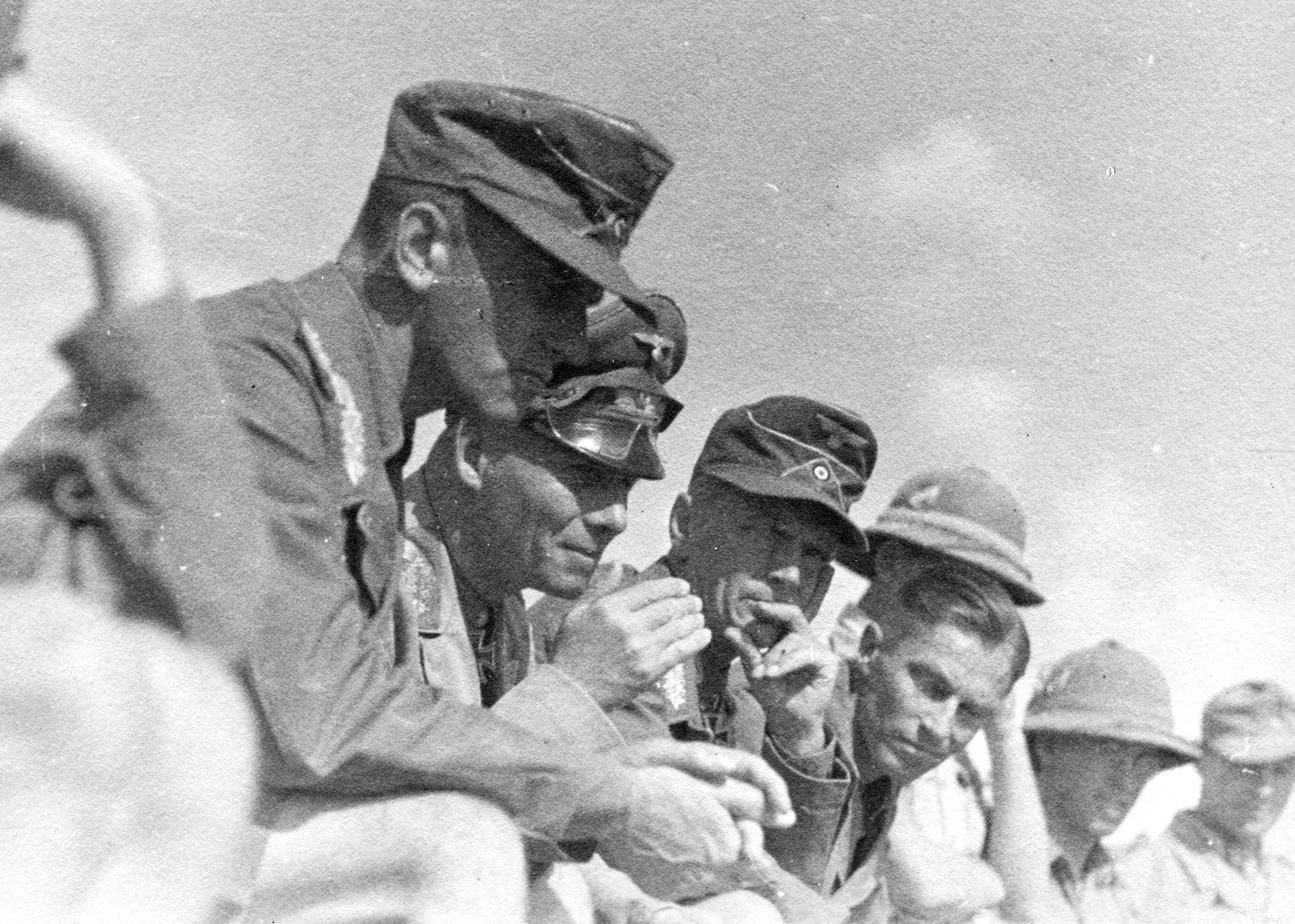
Alfred Gause (left), Rommel (second-left) and Walter Neumann-Silkow (middle) in North Africa, 1941.

Gause was initially sent to Africa by the OKH on 1 June 1941. With a large staff, he was to act as a liaison officer with the Italian high command, Comando Supremo. Freshly promoted to Generalmajor, he had specific instructions not to place himself under the command of Erwin Rommel, but did so when Rommel told him categorically that the command of all troops in Africa was vested in him. The claim is incorrect but Gause acceded and became Rommel's chief of staff from 15 August 1941. It was also suggested that such unpredicted decision was influenced by his own witnesses in Rommel’s performance facing Battleaxe, much impressed by the desert commander’s composure and self-assurance.

Nevertheless, on 13 June, Gause, the liaison officer, expressed the early encountered difficulties in a long talk with Halder. Primarily, Claus von dem Borne, Heinz Heggenreiner and Rommel were "ganging up" on Gause in his new post. Instead of a desired mutual confidence, personal relationship between them was complicated by the “inordinate ambition” of Rommel, along with his brutality and the backing he has on top level — the close relationship with Hitler. The Italian ally saw Gause as another German sent to dominate their military decisions, opposite to the fact that Gause’s role was nominally placing the Axis forces under Italian command. Challenges were evident in the overall command structure of the Axis office politics, but Gause was not a complainer and acted with a military aspect, trying his best to adapt to the unorthodox method of Rommel. In December 1941, Gause was awarded the Knight's Cross of the Iron Cross.

He proved invaluable to Rommel, who was well known to direct his forces from the front and who frequently would lose touch with his command staff during operations. Such working condition made Gause "tired and emaciated", thus difficult to make the right decision. Gause spent two and a half years serving Rommel in the Panzer Army, accompanying the commander on the frontline. According to Rommel, Gause had a "clear and energetic personality", that his tactical talent and tirelessness made him reliable and suitable as an army chief.

Regardless of the danger embedded in this command style, Gause still approved how the benefits of Rommel’s style outweighed the problems caused by his absence from headquarters, addressing the ever-changing nature of desert warfare. During the attack on Got-el-Ualeb in the Battle of Gazala on 1 June, Gause was nearly hit by a British antitank round but was hurled backward and landed on the ground with a serious brain concussion with shrapnel wounds. His position was temporarily replaced by Fritz Bayerlein. Rommel departed for health concerns on 3 September 1942, Georg Stumme took command of the Army Group, with Westphal being the chief of staff. In order to assure the troops and supplies needed for the African campaign and the newly activated 5th Panzer Army in Tunisia, on 7 December Gause was named chief of staff of Special-Staff Libya and Tunisia, a branch of the OKW in Rome. When Army Group Afrika was created in Tunisia, Gause became its chief of staff on 1 March 1943, and was promoted to Generalleutnant. Its commander Rommel was recalled involuntarily to Europe on 9 March 1943, whilst Generaloberst Hans-Jürgen von Arnim succeeded and Gause remained the chief of staff.

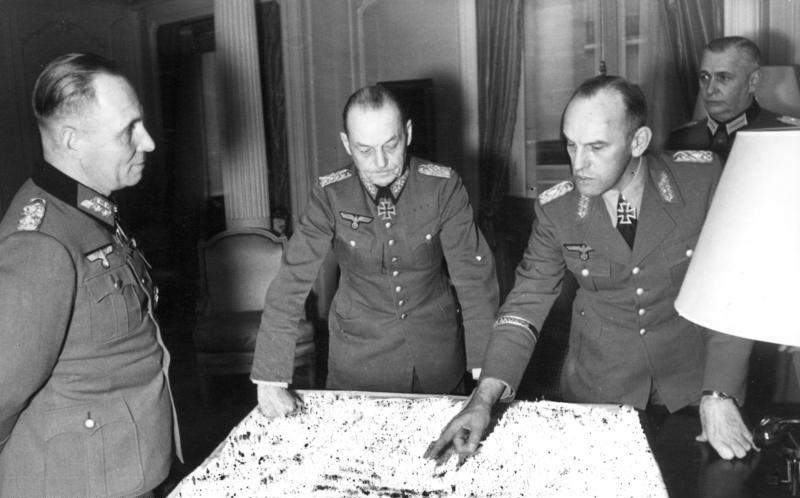
Alfred Gause (right), with Erwin Rommel (left), Gerd von Rundstedt and Bodo Zimmermann (rear) (Hotel George V, Paris; 19 Dec 1943)

In early May 1943, he was relieved to the officer reserve force by Hans-Jürgen von Arnim to prevent a burden of the trained officer, and thus was off the continent when the Axis forces in Africa surrendered.

Gause rejoined Rommel in his postings in Italy and Northern France. To defend the upcoming Allied invasion in the Mediterranean, on 20 May he was detached to a special staff of Rommel for the planning and execution of Operation Alarich, the disarm and occupation of North Italy.

=== France ===
Rommel naturally brought his staff along with him after the rearrangement to France on 10 July 1943. Gause served as the chief of staff of Army Group B and occupied by communication tasks. He recommended Friedrich Ruge as the Naval liaison officer and advisor for the project Atlantic Wall, whom he met in Italy, 1943. Based on the experiences in the southern theatre, Gause had also emphasized on the necessity of quick action in the case of a landing, clarifying that the army group did not intend to “tie down” the mobile units and guaranteed the flexibility.

He was relieved on 15 April 1944, where Rommel again praised his organizational and tactful talents with a hardness on himself, but hesitated on his future performance under heavy pressure, specifically referring to the unhealed concussion in the Battle of Gazala. However, whether this is the truth had remained unearthed. Rommel's wife, Lucie, had demanded Rommel to discharge Gause in order to remove his wife from their house in Herrlingen, due to arguments over the quality of the two ladies' wedding ceremonies. Meanwhile, it was also mentioned that Gause scolded Aldinger, Rommel's private adjutant and friend, for being late to gardening. Rommel privately asked Gause to resign and hoped that he could receive a panzer division afterward, which Burgdorf noted as a possible panzer commander in the West on 23 April; Gause was appointed as the commander of the 9th Panzer Division on 10 May but nullified on the same day. A cherishing farewell party for Gause was held on 20 April with Rommel’s speech and intimate talks within the staff until late night. He had already handed his successor, Hans Speidel, the informations and tasks, and departed to Berlin the next morning at 7:30.

Gause was then put in reserves for two months until the appointment on 15 June to Panzergruppe West, later renamed the 5th Panzer Army, that participated in the retreat of German forces in France. After the Normandy landing, he served as Geyer von Schweppenburg's new chief of staff. Visited by Ruge at the Panzer Army headquarters, he welcomed him with fried eggs and brandy. In mid-August, Gause successfully got the men and all the important fighting vehicles to the opposite bank when the Allies did not immediately attack with the anticipated strength against the German position near the Risle River, although the equipment losses were heavy. After the Allied had run over the Kitzinger Line on 31 August, Sepp Dietrich expressed his doubts and merely told Gause to give up the constant attempt to establish contact with the subordinate troops. On 1 September, when Walter Model ordered the 15th Army and 5th Panzerarmee to prevent the total annihilation of the pushed 15th Army by closing the frontline, Gause referred the order as a mere “war diary order.” He stated that “there was no normal front line anymore”, where the units were no longer units, cannot “be given any impossible orders.” His blunt words described the shattered condition of the Western Front.

In September 1944 he became Chief of Staff of the 6th Panzer Army, which he held through the end of November. During the postponement of the later Ardennes counter-offensive from 20 October to 10 December for extra preparation, on 20 November, Hitler ordered Fritz Kraemer to take over Gause as Dietrich's chief of staff with no given explanation. It is probable that Hitler suspected that Gause, being a classic Wehrmacht officer, as opposed to Waffen-SS, did not have sufficient "fire in the belly", whereas Kraemer had already proved his courage in Normandy and formally transferred to the Waffen-SS. Gause had briefed the successor on the impending offensive during their handover-takeover, although Dietrich stated that this counter-offensive was only known to him on 12 December in postwar interrogations. On the other hand, Hitler had previously ordered General Krebs, the new chief of staff of Army Group B, to purge this "totally contaminated" staff after Rommel's death on 14 October. Although Gause had been removed earlier, Hitler's mistrust of Rommel's officers could remain.

=== Courland ===
From 4 to 31 January 1945, he attended the course for commanding generals and received no further orders. Brennecke, after the third course for commanding generals and corps chiefs, commented Gause with a "distinct East Prussian tribal stamp", and approved his firm performances with no concern for health condition.

On 5 April 1945, a month before Germany surrendered, he was ordered by Hitler to be assigned to II Army Corps in Courland. Gause was captured by Soviet troops in the Courland Pocket on 10 May 1945. He was a prisoner of the Soviets in the Prisoner-of-war camp 5110/48 Woikowo. The physical labor work started in 1950, until his release on 10 October 1955, as one of the last German prisoners.

== Postwar ==
After returning to Karlschule, Gause joined the Control Group of the US Foreign Military Studies, Historical Division. Although he did not publish any books, he had written several military articles about his experiences in the Second World War.

== Works ==
=== Articles ===
- "The campaign in North Africa 1941", Wehrwissenschaftliche Rundschau, 1962
- "The campaign in North Africa 1942", Wehrwissenschaftliche Rundschau, 1962
- "The campaign in North Africa 1943", Wehrwissenschaftliche Rundschau, 1962
- "Command techniques employed by field marshal Rommel in Africa", Bundesarchiv, 1957. Later published in magazine, ARMOR, 1958

== Awards and decorations ==
- Iron Cross 2nd Class and 1st Class in 1914
- Wound Badge in Black in 1914
- Honour Cross of the World War 1914/1918 with swords in 1934
- Anschluss Medal
- Sudetenland Medal with Prague Castle clasp on 1 October 1938
- Clasp to the Iron Cross 2nd Class on 14 May 1940 and 1st Class on 4 June 1940
- Knight's Cross of the Iron Cross on 13 December 1941 as Generalmajor and Chef der Generalstab Panzer Gruppe "Afrika"
- Medaille für den italienisch-deutschen Feldzug in Afrika on 19 January 1942
- Panzer Badge in Silver on 9 February 1942
- Italian Silver Medal of Military Valor
- Italian Military Order of Savoy
- Wehrmacht Long Service Award in Silver on 25 August 1943
- Africa Cuff Title on 15 March 1943

Military offices
Preceded by General der Infanterie Walther Fischer von Weikersthal	Commander of LXVII. Armeekorps; 1 June 1944 - 7 June 1944	Succeeded by General der Infanterie Walther Fischer von Weikersthal
Preceded by General der Infanterie Dr. rer. pol. Dr.-Ing. Johannes Mayer	Commander of II. Armeekorps; 1 April 1945 - 8 May 1945	Succeeded by None
