= Walther Fischer von Weikersthal =

WW2 German Army general (1890–1953)

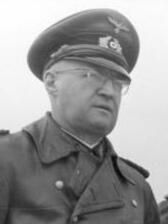
- Born: 15 September 1890
- Died: 11 February 1953 (aged 62)
- Military career
- Allegiance: German Empire; Weimar Republic; Nazi Germany
- Branch: German Army
- Service years: 1909–1945
- Rank: General der Infanterie
- Commands: 35th Infantry Division; LIII Army Corps; LXVII Army Coprs
- Conflicts: World War I; World War II; Annexation of Austria; Battle of France; Operation Barbarossa; Battle of Białystok–Minsk; Battle of Smolensk; Battle of Moscow
- Awards: Knight's Cross of the Iron Cross

Walther Fischer von Weikersthal (15 September 1890 – 11 February 1953) was a German general in the German Army during World War II. A career officer who also served in the Army of Württemberg in World War I and the Weimar Republic's Reichswehr, Weikersthal was a recipient of the Knight's Cross of the Iron Cross.

During Operation Barbarossa, the invasion of the Soviet Union, and the Battle of Moscow, Weikersthal was implicated in war crimes, including approvals for the execution of hostages, the burning of villages, and public hangings of alleged partisans. He was dismissed from command in late December 1941, during the Soviet winter counter-offensive, for disobeying Hitler's "no-retreat" order.

== Early life and World War I ==
Weikersthal was born in 1890 to an aristocratic family, the son of a captain in the Army of Württemberg. He attended Gymnasium in Rottweil and Stuttgart, then entered the 1. Württembergisches Grenadier-Regiment in 1909.

Weikersthal served on both fronts in World War I, including sixteen months on the Western Front and nine months on the Eastern Front (from December 1914 to September 1915). He was wounded in France in September 1914. Fighting in the 26th Infantry Division, he served in Poland before his division was transferred to Serbia. As general staff officer of XIII Army Corps, he assisted with secretive troop demobilizations in autumn 1918.

== World War II ==
Under the Nazi regime, Weikersthal supported Adolf Hitler's opposition to the Treaty of Versailles and his promises of military rearmament. His family later recounted that his first impressions of the Nazis were "very positive." Shortly before the 1938 annexation of Austria, Weikersthal was promoted to the rank of general.

In October 1940, Weikersthal was appointed commander of the 35th Infantry Division, which was earmarked for Operation Barbarossa, the German invasion of the Soviet Union. Before the invasion, the German military's Supreme Command issued the Commissar Order on 6 June 1941, ordering the Wehrmacht to summarily execute captured Soviet political officers. While Freiherr von Welck claims that Weikersthal "expressly forbade the passing of this order down to [his] troops", the division shot three commissars by the end of its first week of combat in Barbarossa.

Weikersthal's 35th Division fought in the battles of Białystok–Minsk, Smolensk, and Vyazma, the three major battles of encirclement on the Eastern Front, in which German forces captured over 1.2 million Soviet prisoners. At Smolensk, Weikersthal was awarded the Knight's Cross. In intense fighting against determined Soviet troops, the German military became increasingly brutalized; a "no-prisoners mentality" became predominant among the 35th Division, which executed Red Army prisoners and shot Jews in reprisals. David Wildermuth notes that Weikersthal's position on prisoner executions was one of "silent acquiescence," and his stance on the murder of Soviet Jews "[lay] between silent acquiescence and undocumented approval."

At the same time, Weikersthal attempted to curb the forced requisitioning by his troops, concerned about maintaining the public image of the German military "as the representative of Anti-bolshevism." Still, although he urged the "correct and respectful comportment" of his troops towards Soviet POWs and civilians, incidents of looting, rape, and violence against the populace were widespread in the Ninth Army by August.

From August to September, the 35th Division was situated in the Wassiljewa region while it prepared for Operation Typhoon. Seeking to cultivate an ally in the Soviet populace against the partisans, Weikersthal forbade the plundering of the civilian population and provided sufficient food for them. When the Ninth Army on 10 September ordered the summary executions of partisans and hostage-taking, Weikersthal emphasized that "every hostile action toward the German army and its facilities will be punishable without exception with death," but also encouraged rewards for civilian collaborators. Even still, the residents of Wassiljewa remained the targets of German requisitions, and Weikersthal approved the execution of hostages, the burning of Bielica, and the November public hanging of eight alleged partisans in Wolokolamsk.

On 1 December Weikersthal was promoted to General der Infanterie. Additionally, he was given command of LIII Corps, part of Heinz Guderian's Second Panzer Army under Army Group Center. By December, his units were exhausted from the severe cold and attrition. While Hitler urged his military to stand fast against Soviet counterattacks, Weikersthal was forced to pull his depleted units back, reserving the right to "act as my conscience dictates" and resign if necessary. Retreating across the Oka River, Weikersthal ordered a scorched-earth policy of destroying "all structures that could be possibly used for shelter."

When Guderian was dismissed on 26 December, after disobeying Hitler's no-retreat order, Rudolf Schmidt was promoted to command Second Panzer Army. Schmidt soon ordered the retreat of Weikersthal's units from Kosjolsk, but the Second Panzer Army command soon insisted that "not one foot of ground should be surrendered." Weikersthal attempted to improve morale and discipline by forming squads to punish deserters, but his control over the tactical situation was beginning to erode as Schmidt gained control over his forces. In January 1942, Weikersthal insisted to Schmidt that counterattacks to restore the German lines were unfeasible due to a lack of reinforcements, and that "abandoning... some present positions" might be necessary. However, this led to a direct order from Hitler for LIII Corps to hold its positions "to the last moment." When Weikersthal ordered some of his units under pressure to retreat, leading to another argument between LIII Corps and Second Panzer Army, he was relieved of command on 25 January and placed in the Führerreserve, under the guise of health problems.

From the end of April 1942 to mid-June 1942, he was mentioned as commander of Höheres Kommando z.b.V. XXXIII in Central Norway. In September 1942, he was appointed commanding general of the LXVII Reserve Army Corps in Brussels. He led this general command, also after the renaming into LXVII Army Corps in January 1944, until the summer of 1944. Then he was again transferred to the Führer Reserve. In March 1945 he was reappointed, now as commanding general of the Higher Command Oberrhein.

Weikersthal was released from American custody in 1947, and died in 1953.

== Awards ==
- Knight's Cross of the Iron Cross on 6 August 1941 as Generalleutnant and commander of 35. Infanterie-Division

Military offices
Preceded by Generalleutnant Hans-Wolfgang Reinhard	Commander of 35. Infanterie-Division; 25 November 1940 – 1 December 1941	Succeeded by Generalmajor Rudolf Freiherr von Roman
Preceded by General der Infanterie Karl Weisenberger	Commander of LIII. Armeekorps; 1 December 1941 – 15 January 1942	Succeeded by General der Infanterie Heinrich Clößner
Preceded by General der Kavallerie Georg Brandt	Commander of XXXIII. Armeekorps; 30 April 1942 - 15 June 1942	Succeeded by General der Artillerie Erwin Engelbrecht
Preceded by None	Commander of LXVII. Armeekorps; 25 September 1942 – 1 June 1944	Succeeded by Generalleutnant Alfred Gause
Preceded by Generalleutnant Alfred Gause	Commander of LXVII. Armeekorps; 7 June 1944 – 24 July 1944	Succeeded by Generalleutnant Carl Püchler
