= 6th Guards Combined Arms Army =

Soviet and Russian field army

- 6-я гвардейская общевойсковая армия
- Great emblem of the 6th Combined Arms Army
- Active: 1939–1945; 1960–1998; 2010–present
- Country: Soviet Union; Russia
- Branch: Red Army; Soviet Army; Russian Ground Forces
- Type: Combined Arms
- Size: Field army
- Part of: Northern Military District (1951-1960); Leningrad Military District (1960–1998); Western Military District (2010–2024); Leningrad Military District (2024–present)
- Garrison/HQ: Agalatovo, Leningrad Oblast
- Engagements: World War II; Soviet invasion of Poland (1939); Operation Barbarossa; Second Battle of Kharkov; Russo-Ukrainian War; Kharkiv offensive; Luhansk Oblast campaign; Kupiansk offensive; 2024 Kursk offensive
- Decorations: Guards

Commanders
- Current commander: Lieutenant general Sergei Storozhenko
- Notable commanders: Lieutenant general Alexander Vasilyevich Peryazev

Insignia
NATO Map Symbol
6
ОА

The 6th Guards Combined Arms Army (Russian: 6-я гвардейская общевойсковая армия) is a field army of the Red Army and the Soviet Army that was active with the Russian Ground Forces until 1998 and has been active since 2010 as the 6th Combined Arms Army (MUN в/ч 31807).

It was first formed in August 1939 in the Kiev Special Military District from the Volochiskaya Army Group (a corps-sized formation).

== First Formation ==
In September 1939 it participated in the Soviet invasion of Poland. At the beginning of war the Army (6th Rifle Corps, 37th Rifle Corps (which included the 80th, 139th, and 141st Rifle Divisions), 4th and 15th Mechanized Corps, 5th Cavalry Corps, 4th Fortified Region, and 6th Fortified Region (Rava-Ruska), and a number of artillery and other units) was deployed on the Lviv direction. It started the Great Patriotic War as part of the Southwestern Front. The army's headquarters was disbanded 10 August 1941 after the Battle of Uman. In this battle, the 6th Army was caught in a huge encirclement south of Kiev along with the 12th Army.

== Second Formation ==
It was immediately reformed within the Southern Front on the basis of the 48th Rifle Corps and other units, and defended the west bank of the Dnepr River northwest of Dnipropetrovsk. On 1 September 1941 it consisted of 169th, 226th, 230th, 255th, 273rd, and 275th Rifle Divisions, 26th and 28th Cavalry Divisions, 47th Rifle Regiment (15th NKVD Rifle Division), 269th, 274th, and 394th Corps Artillery Regiments, 522nd High-power Howitzer Artillery Regiment гап б/м, 671st Artillery Regiment of the Reserve of the Supreme High Command (ап РВГК), 14th, 27th Separate Anti-Aircraft Artillery Divisions, and 8th Tank Division. It was then transferred to the Soviet Southwestern Front and took part in defensive actions in the Donbas, the Barvenkovo-Lozovaia operation, and the Second Battle of Kharkov, but along with the 57th Army, was surrounded in the Izium pocket with the loss of 200,000 plus men in casualties alone, and afterwards formally disbanded.

== Third Formation ==
The Army was reformed in July 1942 for the third time from the 6th Reserve Army, comprising the 45th, 99th, 141st, 160th, 174th, 212th, 219th, and 309th Rifle Divisions plus the 141st Rifle Brigade. It was assigned in sequence to the Voronezh, Southwestern, and 3rd Ukrainian Fronts. In January 1943, the 6th Army smashed through the defensive lines of the Alpini divisions of the Italian 8th Army as part of Operation Little Saturn.

In September 1943 it consisted of the 4th Guards Rifle Corps (38th Guards, 263rd, 267th Rifle Divisions), 26th Guards Rifle Corps (25th Guards, 35th and 47th Guards Rifle Divisions), and the 33rd Rifle Corps (50th, 78th, 243rd Rifle Divisions).

In 1944 it took part in the Nikopol-Kryvyi Rih, Bereznogova-Snigorovka, and Odessa offensives. It was disbanded in June 1944.

== Fourth Formation ==
The 6th Army was reformed in December 1944 with troops from 3rd Guards and 13th Armies. On 1 January 1945 the Army consisted of the 22nd Rifle Corps (218th and 273rd Rifle Divisions), the 74th Rifle Corps (181st and 309th Rifle Divisions), the 359th Rifle Division, the 77th Fortified Region, and other support units.

During 1945 the Army took part in the Sandomierz–Silesia, and the Lower Silesia offensives. During the Lower Silesia offensive in February 1945, 6th Army, commanded by Marshal Ivan Koniev, besieged Fortress Breslau (Festung Breslau) in the Battle of Breslau. The army besieged the city on February 13, 1945, and the encirclement of Breslau was completed the following day. The 1st Ukrainian Front forces besieged the city with the 22nd and 74th Rifle Corps, and the 77th Fortified Region, as well as other smaller units. Even approximate estimates vary greatly concerning the number of German troops trapped in Breslau. Some sources claim that there were as many as 150,000 defenders, some 80,000 and some 50,000. The Siege of Breslau consisted of destructive house-to-house street fighting. The city was bombarded to ruin by artillery of the 6th Army, as well as the 2nd Air Army and the 18th Air Army. During the siege, both sides resorted to setting entire districts of the city on fire.

After the end of the Second World War, the 6th Army was withdrawn from Germany and stationed briefly in the Orel Military District before being disbanded in the Voronezh Military District late in 1945.

== Fifth Formation ==
The 6th Army was (re)formed from the 31st Rifle Corps on 2 April 1952 in Murmansk, Murmansk Oblast. That year it comprised the 45th Rifle Division (Pechenga, Murmansk Oblast); the 67th Rifle Division (Murmansk, Murmansk Oblast); the 341st Rifle Division (Alakurtti, Murmansk Oblast); and the 367th Rifle Division (Sortavala, Karelian ASSR). The army was disbanded at Murmansk in early 1960.

The army was reformed again from Headquarters Northern Military District in May–June 1960 with headquarters at Petrozavodsk. On 15 January 1974, this formation was awarded the Order of the Red Banner.

In 1977 the 88th Independent Helicopter Squadron was moved from Nurmalitsy to Apatity.

In 1988 the army consisted of:

- 16th Motor Rifle Division (Petrozavodsk) (mobilisation)
- 109th Motor Rifle Division (Alakurtti) (mobilisation)
- 116th Motor Rifle Division (Nagorniy/Нагорный) (Murmansk) (mobilisation)
- 54th Motor Rifle Division (Alakurtti) Established on 4 June 1957 in Alakurtti from the 54th Rifle Division. Composed of 338th Guards Tank Regiment, 221st Guards и 251 (Кандалакша), 281st Motor Rifle Regiments, 441st Artillery Regiment, 454 зрап. In 1987 the 338th Guards Tank Regiment was reduced and renamed 82nd independent Tank Battalion.
- 111th Motor Rifle Division (Sortavala), 379th Tank Regiment (Lakhdenpokhya, Karelian ASSR) 182* и 185 (Лахденпохья), 184 109 ап, 1037 зрап. In 1987 the tank regiment was reduced to a battalion.
- 131st Motor Rifle Division (Pechenga)
- 88th Independent Helicopter Squadron (Apatity, Murmansk Oblast, from 1977) Disbanded 1991 or 1994. (Kirovsk-Apatity Airport)
- 840th Independent Engineer-Sapper Battalion
- 6th Missile Brigade (Pinozero, Murmansk Oblast), equipped with R-11 and R-17 SRBMs until 1991, and then OTR-21 Tochka SRBMs until its disbandment in 1998
- and several other independent brigades, regiments, and battalions

In 1989 the 16th Motor Rifle Division (mobilisation) became the 5186th Base for Storage of Weapons and Equipment (БХВТ) (30th мотострелковая бригада), and the 37th similarly became a weapons and equipment storage base (VKhVT). In 1994-95 the 111th Motor Rifle Division (Sortavala) became the 20th Independent Motor Rifle Brigade and shifted into the 30th Guards Army Corps.

In January 1996 it consisted of the 161st Artillery Brigade, the 182nd MRL Regiment, the 485th Separate Helicopter Regiment, the 54th Motor Rifle Division (Allakurtti), and the 131st Motor Rifle Division (Pechenga). It finally disbanded after the fall of the Soviet Union in 1997–98.

== Sixth Formation ==
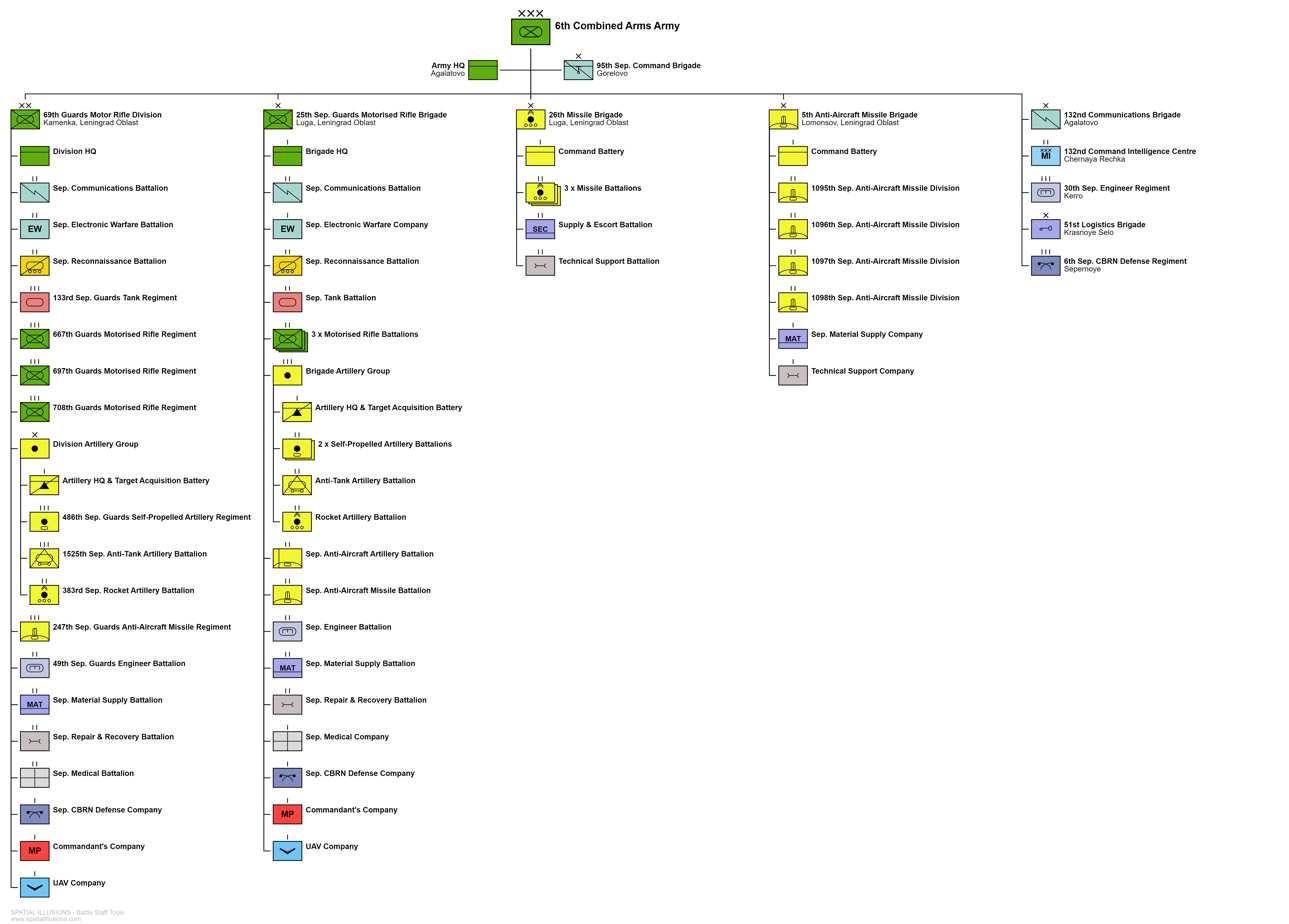
Organization structure of the 6th CAA in 2024.

In 2010, as part of the creation of the Western Military District/Western Operational-Strategic Command with headquarters at St. Petersburg, the army was reformed. The new 6th Army may include:

- 6th Combined Arms Army Headquarters in Agalatovo, Leningrad Oblast
- 95th Command Brigade in Gorelovo, Leningrad Oblast
- 132nd Signals Brigade in Agalatovo, Leningrad Oblast
- 68th Guards Motor Rifle Division ( в/ч 29760) Vladimirsky Lager, Pskov Oblast
- 69th Guards Motor Rifle Division (в/ч 02511) Kamenka, Leningrad Oblast
- 9th Guards Artillery Brigade (в/ч 54006) Luga, Leningrad Oblast
- 5th Anti-Aircraft Rocket Brigade (в/ч 74429) Lomonosov, Leningrad Oblast
- 26th Rocket Brigade, Luga, Leningrad Oblast (surface-to-surface missiles)
- 30th Engineering Regiment, Kerro, Leningrad Oblast
- 6th Chemical, Biological, Radiological, and Nuclear Regiment in Sapyornoye, Leningrad Oblast (MUN 12086)
- 51st Logistics Brigade in Saint Petersburg, Leningrad Oblast

The army took part in the 2022 Russian invasion of Ukraine. Its units fought during the Northeastern Ukraine offensive around Kharkiv, but failed to capture the city. Reportedly, the army's commander, Lieutenant General Yershov, was dismissed and placed under house arrest at the end of March. As of April 2023, the army is conducting operations along the Svatove-Kreminna line in Luhansk Oblast. In May 2024, the 138th Guards Motor Rifle Brigade was expanded into the 69th Guards Motor Rifle Division.

In January 2025, the 25th Guards Motor Rifle Brigade was reformed into the 68th Motor Rifle Division. In September and October 2025, it was reported that units of the 6th Combined Arms Army were taking part in combat in and around the city of Kupiansk in the Kharkiv region. On 6 October 2025, the army was awarded the "Guards" status.

== Commanders ==
- Lieutenant-General Filipp Golikov (09/28/1939 – July 1940)
- Lieutenant-General Ivan Muzychenko (07.26.1940 – 08/10/1941) (captured)
- Major General, Lieutenant-General Rodion Malinovsky (08/25/1941 – 12/24/1941)
- Major General, Lieutenant-General Avksenty Gorodnyansky (01/25/1942 – 05/27/1942) (KIA 05/27/1942)
- Major General, Lieutenant-General Fyodor Kharitonov (07/08/1942 – 05/20/1943) (died 05/28/1943)
- Lieutenant-General Ivan Shlemin (05/21/1943 – 05/28/1944)
- Colonel General Vyacheslav Tsvetayev (September 12, 1944 – September 28, 1944)
- Major General Fyodor Kulishev (09/29/1944 – 12/06/1944)
- Lieutenant-General Vladimir Gluzdovsky (12/07/1944 – 05/09/1945)
- ...
- Lieutenant General Yevgeny Alekseyevich (January 2011 – April 2013)
- Lieutenant General Sergei Vasilyevich Kuralenko (May 2013 – December 2015)
- Lieutenant General Andrei Vladimirovich Kuzmenko (February 2016 – February 2019)
- Lieutenant General Vladislav Nikolaevich Yershov (February 2019 – March 2022 [dismissed])
- Lieutenant General Andrey Peryazev (August 2023 – ? 2023)
- Lieutenant General Sergei Storozhenko (2023 – present)
