= XXXIII Army Corps (Wehrmacht) =

Höheres Kommando z.b.V. XXXIII XXXIII. Armeekorps
- Active: 18 October 1939 – 8 May 1945
- Country: Nazi Germany
- Branch: Army
- Size: Corps
- Engagements: World War II: Battle of France; German occupation of Norway

Commanders
- Notable commanders: Erwin Engelbrecht

German XXXIII. Corps (XXXIII. Armeekorps) was a corps in the German Army during World War II.

== History ==
The Corps was first known as Höheres Kommando z.b.V. XXXIII (H.Kdo.) and was established on 18 October 1939 from the Border Guard Section Command 3 (Oppeln) after the end of the Polish campaign.

It was initially deployed under the 6th Army on the Lower Rhine, but in March 1940 it was transferred to the Upper Rhine to Army Group C, where it was part of the 7th Army. Towards the end of the Battle of France, the Corps advanced with the 213th, 239th, 554th and 556th Infantry Divisions and captured Mulhouse. After the armistice with France, it was temporarily stationed in the Dijon area.

In August 1940, the command was transferred to Central Norway, together with the Höheres Kommando z.b.V. XXXVI. Here, it served as an occupation and coastal defense force around Trondheim at the head of the 181st and 196th Infantry Divisions. As of August 30, 1940, the staff also acted as Territorialbefehlshaber Mittelnorwegen. The H.Kdo. was not involved in any fighting in Norway.

The Höheres Kommando z.b.V. XXXIII was renamed 33rd Army Corps on 23 January 1943.
The 33rd Army Corps capitulated to the British on 8 May 1945, together with all other German troops in Norway .

== Commanders ==
=== Höheres Kommando XXXIII ===
- General der Kavallerie Georg Brandt (18 October 1939 - 30 April 1942)
- General der Infanterie Walther Fischer von Weikersthal (30 April 1942 - 15 June 1942)
- General der Artillerie Erwin Engelbrecht (15 June 1942 - 23 January 1943)

=== XXXIII Corps ===
- General der Artillerie Erwin Engelbrecht (23 January 1943 - 25 December 1943)
- General der Infanterie Ludwig Wolff (25 December 1943 - 10 August 1944)
- General der Kavallerie Karl-Erik Köhler (10 August 1944 - 31 March 1945)
- Generalmajor Friedrich von Unger (31 March 1945 - 5 April 1945)
- Generalleutnant Friedrich-Wilhelm Neumann (5 April 1945 - 8 May 1945)

== Area of operations ==
- France : October 1939 – August 1940
- Norway : August 1940 - May 1945

== See also ==
- List of German corps in World War II

== Sources ==
- This is a translation of the article in the Dutch Wikipedia, Höheres Kommando z.b.V. XXXIII.
- This is a translation of the article in the Dutch Wikipedia, 33e Legerkorps (Wehrmacht).
- "Höheres Kommando z.b.V. XXXIII". Lexikon der Wehrmacht.
- "XXXIII. Armeekorps". Lexikon der Wehrmacht.
