= 94th Infantry Division (Wehrmacht) =

- 94. Infanterie-Division
- Active: September 1939 – January 1943; March 1943 – April 1945
- Country: Nazi Germany
- Branch: Army
- Type: Infantry
- Size: Division
- Garrison/HQ: Naumburg; Bautzen; Zwickau
- Engagements: World War II: Eastern Front; Battle of Kiev; Battle of Kalach; Battle of Stalingrad; Italian Campaign

Commanders
- Notable commanders: General of the Artillery Georg Pfeiffer

The 94th Infantry Division (German: 94. Infanteriedivision) was a German Army infantry division in World War II.

== History ==
=== Formation and the west campaign ===
The 94th Infantry Division was raised in September 1939 as part of the fifth wave from men of Military District number 4 (Wehrkreis 4), which comprised Saxony and Thuringia. The division was then sent to the Saarland in December, should the French invade. The division then aided the 6th Army in their border-crossing the following year. Following a fatal car collision in August 1940, General of the Infantry Hellmuth Volkmann was replaced by Major General Georg Pfeiffer.

=== The east campaign and destruction ===
In June 1941, the 94th Division attacked the Soviet Union with a large number of other German divisions. However; until October 1942, the 94th was assigned to the occupied Ukraine. In June 1942, Major General Pfeiffer was promoted to Lieutenant General. During the Case Blue offensive, the division was sent with the 6th Army as a component of LI Corps to capture the industrial Russian city of Stalingrad, which was considered important in crushing Soviet morale. 94th Infantry Division was cut off from supplies and reinforcements outside of Stalingrad, as a Soviet pincer-movement left the 6th Army surrounded.

The commander Lieutenant General Pfeiffer and his staff were flown out on December 11. The remnants of the 94th division surrendered in the last days of January 1943.

=== Recreation and surrender ===
The 94th was recreated later in 1943 and later moved to the Mediterranean, where the Allies opened up a new front in Italy. In Autumn 1944, remnants of the 95th Infantry and 278th Volksgrenadier Divisions were reconstituted as part of the 94th Infantry. The division surrendered on 22 April 1945.

== War crimes ==
The division has been implicated in the San Polo massacre (Tuscany), on 14 July 1944, when 63 civilians were executed.

== Order of battle ==
1942

- 267th Grenadier Regiment
- 274th Grenadier Regiment
- 276th Grenadier Regiment
- 194th Schnelle Abteilung
- 194th Artillery Regiment
- 194th Engineer Battalion
- 194th Signal Battalion
- 194th Supply Detachment

1943

- 267th Grenadier Regiment
- 274th Grenadier Regiment
- 276th Grenadier Regiment
- 194th Reconnaissance Battalion
- 194th Artillery Regiment
- 194th Engineer Battalion
- 194th Anti-tank Battalion
- 194th Signal Battalion
- 194th Field-replacement Battalion
- 194th Supply Detachment

== Commanders ==
- General of the Infantry Hellmuth Volkmann (25 September 1939 – 21 August 1940)
- General of the Artillery Georg Pfeiffer (21 August 1940 – 2 January 1944)
- Lieutenant General Bernhard Steinmetz (2 January 1944 – 22 April 1945)
