= Vladimir Gluzdovsky =

Soviet military leader (1903–1967)

Vladimir Alekseyevich Gluzdovsky (Russian: Владимир Алексеевич Глуздовский; 27 May [O.S. 14 May] 1903 – 16 November 1967) was a Soviet Army lieutenant general who held field army command during World War II.

== Prewar service ==
Vladimir Alekseyevich Gluzdovsky was born on 27 May 1903 in Tiflis. During the Russian Civil War he was conscripted into the Red Army in May 1919 and fought as part of the Oryol Komsomol and Communist Detachment on the Eastern Front. From October 1919 he continued his service in the volunteer communist detachment of the 1st Workers Regiment of the 9th Rifle Division, which as part of the 13th Army of the Southern Front fought against the Armed Forces of South Russia, participating in the Orel–Kursk operation. Gluzdovsky became a military censor in Oryol in January 1920 and in April became political commissar and deputy military commissar of the district territorial forces, and from May 1921 was a soldier for special assignments with the 25th Separate Battalion of the Cheka Troops.

After the end of the Russian Civil War, Gluzdovsky continued serving in the Cheka troops from February 1922. In November 1926 he was sent to study at the Vystrel course, and upon graduation in November 1927 was posted to the 11th Separate Battalion in Batumi, where he served as a company commander and assistant battalion commander. In January 1930 he was transferred to the 4th Rifle Division in Barnaul, with which he served as head of the junior commanders' school. From April 1932 to July 1936 he studied at the Frunze Military Academy, then was chief of staff of the 1st Belorussian Motorized Mechanized Regiment. In January 1938 Gluzdovsky was appointed head of a section of the combat training department of the Border Troops Directorate in Minsk, and from May of that year he commanded the 73rd Regiment of the NKVD Troops. From October 1938 he was deputy head of the 4th Department of the Main Naval Staff, and in October 1939 appointed chief of staff of the 118th Rifle Division in the North Caucasus Military District. From November 1939 to October 1940 he served as a military adviser in China. Upon returning to the Soviet Union in November 1940 then-Colonel Gluzdovsky was appointed deputy commander of the 1st Motorized Division of the 7th Mechanized Corps in the Moscow Military District.

== World War II ==
After Operation Barbarossa began, the 1st Motorized Division fought in the Battle of Smolensk as part of the 20th Army of the Western Front. From October 1941 Gluzdovsky served as head of the operations department of the 26th Army, forming in the Moscow Military District. Without completing its formation, the army was sent into defensive battles. Suffering heavy losses near Mtsensk during the Battle of Moscow the army was disbanded at the end of October, and Gluzdovsky appointed chief of staff of the 31st Army, which as part of the Kalinin Front participated in the Kalinin defensive and offensive operations during the Battle of Moscow. During the winter and spring of 1942 the army participated in the Rzhev–Vyazma Offensive, after which from 20 April it went on the defensive east of Zubtsov. Gluzdovsky was promoted to major general on 3 May. In July and August the army joined the Western Front and fought in the Rzhev–Sychyovka operation. From February 1943 Major General Gluzdovsky commanded the 31st Army, which as part of the Kalinin Front fought in the Rzhev–Vyazma Offensive. From July 1943 the army was part of the Western Front, fighting in the Smolensk, Spas-Demensk, and Yelnya-Dorogobuzh operations. Gluzdovsky was promoted to lieutenant general on 9 September 1943. He led the army in unsuccessful positional battles during the winter of 1943 to 1944 in eastern Belorussia. After the failed Vitebsk offensive, he was relieved of command of the 31st Army and placed at the disposal of the Main Personnel Directorate in April 1944.

Appointed commander of the 7th Army of the Karelian Front in August 1944, Gluzdovsky commanded it in the continued advance in Karelia. By the end of September the army reached the Soviet-Finnish border, and on 8 October it was withdrawn to the reserve. In December he was appointed commander of the 6th Army of the 1st Ukrainian Front, which he led in the Vistula–Oder offensive, the Sandomierz–Silesian offensive, and the Lower Silesian offensive. Gluzdovsky ended the war in command of the army which besieged Breslau from March.

== Postwar ==
After the end of the war, Gluzdovsky continued to command the 6th Army. From January 1946 he was posted to the Frunze Military Academy, where he served as head of the advanced training courses for rifle division commanders, head of the military history faculty, and from July 1951 as head of the higher unit tactics department. He returned to operational posts in January 1955 as chief of staff of the Baltic Military District, and then served in the same position with the Taurida Military District from January 1956 and the Transbaikal Military District from July 1956. Placed at the disposal of the Ground Forces Commander-in-Chief in September 1960, he retired in February 1961. Gluzdovsky died 16 November 1967 in Simferopol.

== Awards ==
- Order of Lenin
- Order of the Red Banner (4)
- Order of Suvorov, 1st class (2)
- Order of Kutuzov, 1st class
