= Ludwig Wolff (general) =

German general (1893–1968)

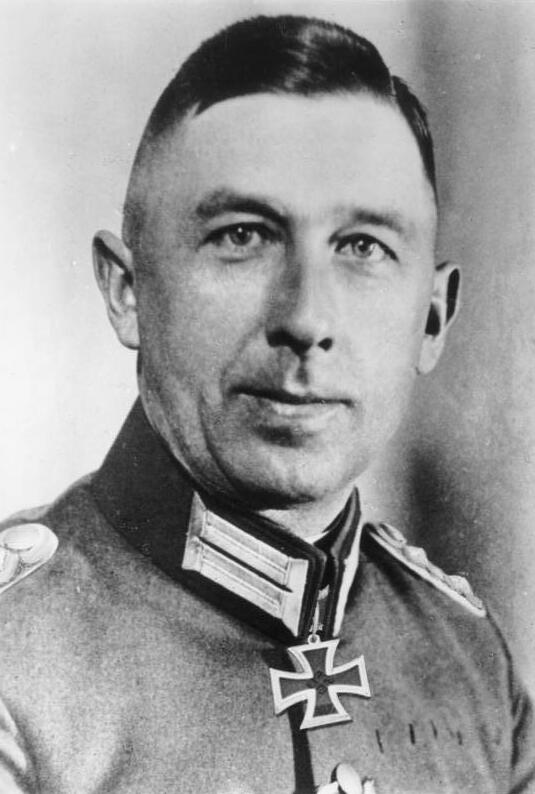
- Born: 3 April 1893; Chemnitz, Kingdom of Saxony, German Empire
- Died: 9 November 1968 (aged 75); Mannheim, Baden-Württemberg, West Germany
- Military career
- Allegiance: German Empire; Weimar Republic; Nazi Germany
- Branch: Army
- Service years: 1912–1945
- Rank: General of the Infantry
- Commands: 22nd Air Landing Division; XXXIII Army Corps
- Conflicts: World War II
- Awards: Knight's Cross of the Iron Cross with Oak Leaves

Ludwig Wolff (3 April 1893 – 9 November 1968) was a general in the Wehrmacht of Nazi Germany during World War II who commanded the XXXIII Army Corps. He was a recipient of the Knight's Cross of the Iron Cross with Oak Leaves.

== Awards and decorations ==
- Iron Cross (1914) 2nd Class (November 1914) &1st Class (28 June 1917)
- Clasp to the Iron Cross (1939) 2nd Class (13 May 1940) &1st Class (18 May 1940)
- German Cross in Gold on 8 February 1942 as Generalmajor in the 22 Infanterie-Division
- Knight's Cross of the Iron Cross with Oak Leaves
  - Knight's Cross on 26 May 1940 as Oberst and commander of Infanterie-Regiment 192
  - Oak Leaves on 22 June 1942 as Generalmajor and commander of 22 Infanterie-Division (Luftlande) 55

Military offices
Preceded by Generalleutnant Hans Graf von Sponeck	Commander of 22. Infanterie-Division (Luftlande); 10 October 1941 – 1 August 1942	Succeeded by Generalmajor Friedrich-Wilhelm Müller
Preceded by General der Artillerie Erwin Engelbrecht	Commander of XXXIII. Armeekorps; 25 December 1943 – 10 August 1944	Succeeded by General der Kavallerie Carl-Erik Koehler
