= 273rd Rifle Division =

- Active: 1st formation: July–November 1941; 2nd formation: February 1942 – summer 1945
- Country: Soviet Union
- Branch: Red Army
- Type: Rifle division
- Engagements: World War II
- Decorations: Order of the Red Banner (2nd formation); Order of Bogdan Khmelnitsky 2nd class (2nd formation)
- Battle honours: Bezhitsa (2nd formation)

The 273rd Rifle Division (Russian: 273-я стрелковая дивизия) was an infantry division of the Soviet Union's Red Army during World War II, formed twice.

The division was first formed in the summer of 1941 and was destroyed in Ukraine during the fall of that year, Reformed in the spring of 1942, the division served through the entire war before being disbanded postwar in the summer of 1945.

== History ==
=== First Formation ===
The 273rd began forming on 10 July 1941 at Dniprodzerzhinsk, part of the Odessa Military District. Its basic order of battle included the 967th, 969th, and the 971st Rifle Regiments, as well as the 812th Artillery Regiment. With its formation delayed by a shortage of machine guns and other heavy weapons, the division was still forming up on 7 August, and was not assigned to the Southern Front's 6th Army until the end of the month. In October, the 273rd was transferred to the 12th Army but disbanded after 1 November, presumably destroyed in the fighting.

=== Second Formation ===
The 273rd began forming for a second time from February to 16 May 1942, initially part of the Ural Military District. It was moved west before it finished forming, being relocated to Podolsk in the Moscow Military District during March. After receiving its commander, the 273rd was assigned to the Moscow Defence Zone on 16 May and in late August transferred to the Voronezh Front reserves. In late September, it was transferred to the front as part of the Don Front's 1st Guards Army, north of Stalingrad. Between November 1942 and February 1943, the 273rd fought in Operation Uranus and Operation Koltso as part of the 24th Army and the 66th Army. After the end of the Battle of Stalingrad in February, the division became part of the Stalingrad Group of Forces in the Reserve of the Supreme High Command (RVGK). In April, the 273rd was assigned to the 11th Army, which was sent to the Bryansk Front in July. On 17 September, during the Battle of Smolensk, the division participated in the recapture of Bezhitsa and was awarded the honorific "Bezhitsa" for its actions.

In October, the division became part of the army's 25th Rifle Corps, now in the Belorussian Front. At the end of the year, the corps and the 273rd were transferred to the 48th Army. In March the division was withdrawn to the RVGK and became part of the 3rd Guards Army's 120th Rifle Corps there. In April it returned to the front with the army and corps, remaining part of these commands until October. By the end of the spring fighting in Ukraine, the 812th Artillery Regiment had been depleted so much that each 76 mm gun was manned by only 3 men, and each 122mm howitzer by 4, which made it almost impossible to the weapons without horses or trucks. In September, the division transferred to the 76th Rifle Corps, and a month later to the 21st Rifle Corps. At the end of the year, the 273rd transferred to the 6th Army and for most of 1945 was part of the 6th Army's 22nd Rifle Corps, except for a few weeks with the 74th Rifle Corps in early February. The division fought in the Siege of Breslau, receiving the Order of the Red Banner for its actions on 4 June. The division received the honorifics "Bezhitsa Red Banner Order of Bogdan Khmelnitsky" for its actions, and was disbanded in the summer of 1945 with the Central Group of Forces.
