= 22nd Rifle Corps =

Soviet Union military unit

- 22-й стрелковый корпус
- Active: 1st formation: June 1940 – September 1941; 2nd formation: November 1942 – summer 1945; 3rd formation: 1949–1956
- Country: Soviet Union
- Branch: Red Army (Soviet Army from 1946)
- Size: Corps

Commanders
- Notable commanders: Gustav Jonson; Alexander Ksenofontov; Konstantin Provalov; Vasily Sergatskov

The 22nd Rifle Corps was a corps of the Red Army, formed thrice. It was initially formed from the Estonian Army after the Soviet occupation of that country in June 1940. The corps was destroyed during the Baltic Operation. After large-scale desertions of its troops, the corps disbanded in September 1941. Its soldiers were used in construction battalions in the Urals, where many of them died. The corps was reformed in November 1942 with the Transcaucasian Front. It fought in the Dnieper–Carpathian Offensive, Lvov–Sandomierz Offensive, Sandomierz–Silesian Offensive and the Prague Offensive during the war. The corps was disbanded in the summer of 1945. Reformed in 1949 in the Transcaucasian Military District, it was disbanded in 1956.

== 22nd Territorial Rifle Corps ==
The 22nd Territorial Rifle Corps was originally formed after the Soviet occupation of the Baltic States. Originally based upon the Estonian Army, reorganised as the 180th and 182nd Rifle Divisions, part of 27th Army, Baltic Special Military District Estonian Territorial Rifle Corps. It came under the command of Major General Mikhail Dukhanov. The Cavalry regiments of the Estonian Ground Force were dissolved and incorporated into the corps, and the Estonian Air Force became the corps aircraft squadron.

Operation Barbarossa began on 22 June 1941, and German formations of Army Group North came sweeping north from East Prussia heading for Leningrad. From 30 June 1941, corps elements were tasked to 1 July 1941 to focus on the front of overseeding, Hills, except Porkhov. Units of the formation to make for stubborn defense front in the south-west and south. On 1 July 1941 the corps concentrated in Porkhov, overseeding, Hills, completely took up defensive positions only by 8 July 1941 at the turn of the Riverlands (45 kilometers south-east of Pskov a), Vertoguzovo (30 kilometers south-west of Porkhov a), Zhgilevo (40 kilometers north of Novorzhev a), is involved in exploration in the island a. Corps headquarters are located 3 kilometers west of the village Pazherevitsy. On 7–8 July 1941 battles took place with advanced German reconnaissance elements 9 July 1941 in the evening clash with attack from the area in the direction of Shmoilova Porkhov and from the area in the direction of Bukhara Dedovichi.

During the fighting, 9–10 July 1941 mass desertions of the 22nd Corps' Estonian personnel took place to the enemy. Among the famous defectors was the Deputy Chief of Operations, Division Staff 180th Rifle Division, Ain-Ervin Mere. 11.10 in July 1941 is fighting for Porkhov. On 10 July 1941 the 111th Motorized Division broke the defense of the 182nd Rifle Division at the station seeding and 11 July 1941 of the case finally left the city, and partly moved to the east bank of the river Shelon, where the defense took the 182nd Rifle Division - east Porkhov, 180th Rifle Division - to the south at the turn of the Red Porkhov Korchilovo, Logovino, Vyshegorod . 12 July 1941. The 182nd Rifle Division was fighting against troops of the enemy trying to break through to Dno.

On 15 August 1941 the 22nd Territorial Rifle Corps, participating in the counterattack, come from the area Parfino at Staraya Russa, to 17 August 1941 corps troops liberated most of the city, but failed to take the city completely. On 20–21 August 1941 part of the body left Staraya Russa. On 22 August 1941, after the re-crossing on the eastern shore of the Lovat, the corps derived from the direct control of fights. By 31 August 1941, the corps was not listed as part of the 'operational army,' fighting the Germans.

On 22 September 1941 the headquarters of the 22nd Territorial Rifle Corps was disbanded. The corps had numbered about 7,000 Estonians. It was destroyed while fighting for the Soviets; 2,000 were killed, and 4,500 taken prisoner by the Germans. The rest, the recruits, were initially used in Construction battalions, effectively mobile forced labour.

== Subsequent formations ==
Second formation formed 20 February 1943 and served with 40th, 18th, 38th Armies, 3rd Guards Army, and the 6th Army. It included the 112th, 135th, 181st, and 273rd Rifle Divisions. The corps was disbanded in the summer of 1945.

The corps headquarters was reformed on 1 September 1949 at Yerevan with the 7th Guards Army of the Transcaucasian Military District, assigned the 261st and 414th Rifle Divisions. By 1955 it included the 26th Mechanized Division in addition to the 261st and 414th, which were renumbered as the 37th and 74th Rifle Divisions, respectively. The corps was disbanded on 9 June 1956, followed by the 74th Rifle Division. Its other two divisions remained with the 7th Guards Army.

== Citations and references ==
=== Cited sources ===
- Feskov, V.I.; Golikov, V.I.; Kalashnikov, K.A.; Slugin, S.A. (2013). Вооруженные силы СССР после Второй Мировой войны: от Красной Армии к Советской [The Armed Forces of the USSR after World War II: From the Red Army to the Soviet: Part 1 Land Forces] (in Russian). Tomsk: Scientific and Technical Literature Publishing. ISBN 9785895035306.
