= Erwin Engelbrecht =

German general (1891–1964)

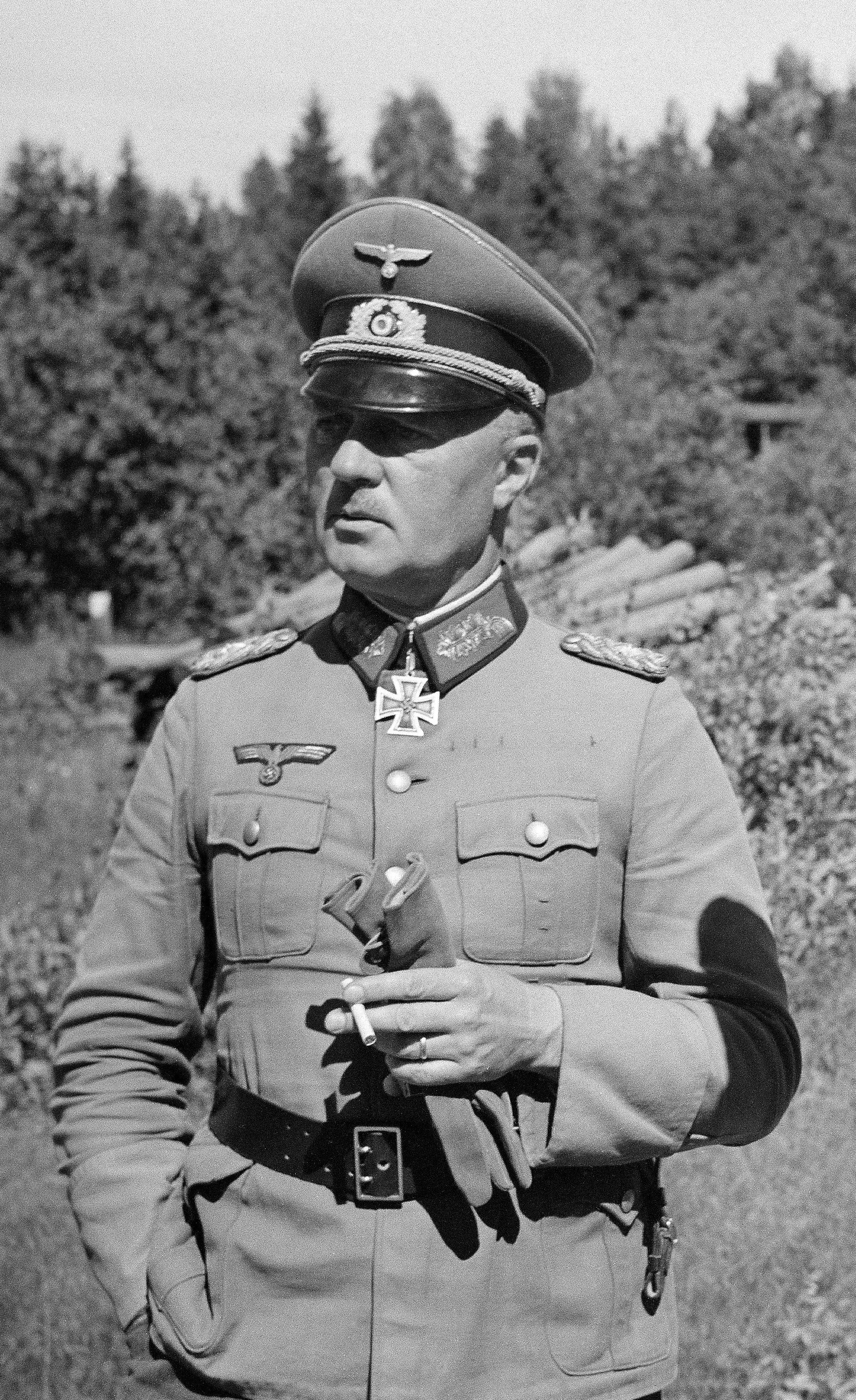
- Born: 12 November 1891; Potsdam, German Empire
- Died: 8 June 1964 (aged 72); Munich, West Germany
- Military career
- Allegiance: German Empire; Weimar Republic; Nazi Germany
- Branch: Army
- Service years: 1913–1945
- Rank: General der Artillerie
- Units: 163. Infanterie-Division; XXXIII Army Corps
- Conflicts: World War II; Operation Weserübung (POW); Finnish invasion of East Karelia
- Awards: Knight's Cross of the Iron Cross

Erwin Engelbrecht (12 November 1891 in Wildpark Potsdam – 8 April 1964 in Munich) was a German military officer.

== Career ==
In January 1939 Engelbrecht was promoted to General, in September 1942 to General of the Artillery. During 1939-1942 he was the commander of the 163rd Infantry Division (Engelbrecht Division); later he was assigned to special forces.

On 9 April 1940, on board the German cruiser Blücher, he led the staff of the forces designated to occupy Oslo during the invasion of Norway. When the ship was sunk, he managed to swim ashore. Along with hundreds of other survivors, Engelbrecht was detained by Norwegian guardsmen at a farm near Drøbak for several hours before being abandoned by their captors.

In 1941 his division was allowed to cross Sweden to join Finnish forces in the Finnish invasion of East Karelia (1941), the only such large scale transit at the time. (See the transit of German troops through Scandinavia for details.)

Engelbrecht took over the leadership of the Höheren Kommandos z.b.V. XXXIII in Trondheim on 15 June 1942, at the same time commander of Central Norway and was promoted to general of the artillery on 1 September 1942. On 23 January 1943 the Higher Command was renamed the XXXIII Army Corps and Engelbrecht remained in command. On 25 December 1943 he was forced to hand over his command to Lieutenant General Ludwig Wolff and was transferred to the Army's Führer Reserve. It was not until 13 September 1944 that he was re-called as leader of the newly formed Higher Command of Saarpfalz, which, however, included only fortification and construction troops.

Engelbrecht surrendered to the American troops in April 1945 and was released from captivity in 1947.

Engelbrecht was awarded the Knight's Cross of the Iron Cross (Ritterkreuz).

== Awards and decorations ==
- Iron Cross (1914)
  - 2nd Class (6 October 1914)
  - 1st Class (31 May 1917)
- Knight's Cross of the House Order of Hohenzollern with Swords (24 June 1918)
- Honour Cross of the World War 1914/1918 (18 January 1935)
- Clasp to the Iron Cross (1939)
  - 2nd Class
  - 1st Class
- Eastern Front Medal (13 July 1942)
- Order of the Cross of Liberty 1st Class with Swords (21 September 1941)
- Knight's Cross of the Iron Cross on 9 May 1940 as Generalleutnant and commander of 163. Infanterie-Division

Military offices
Preceded by none	Commander of 163. Infanterie-Division; 25 October 1939 – 15 June 1942	Succeeded by General der Infanterie Anton Dostler
Preceded by General der Artillerie Walther Fischer von Weikersthal	Commander of XXXIII. Armeekorps; 15 June 1942 - 25 December 1943	Succeeded by General der Kavallerie Ludwig Wolff
