= Agalatovo =

Agalatovo Агалатово
- Selo
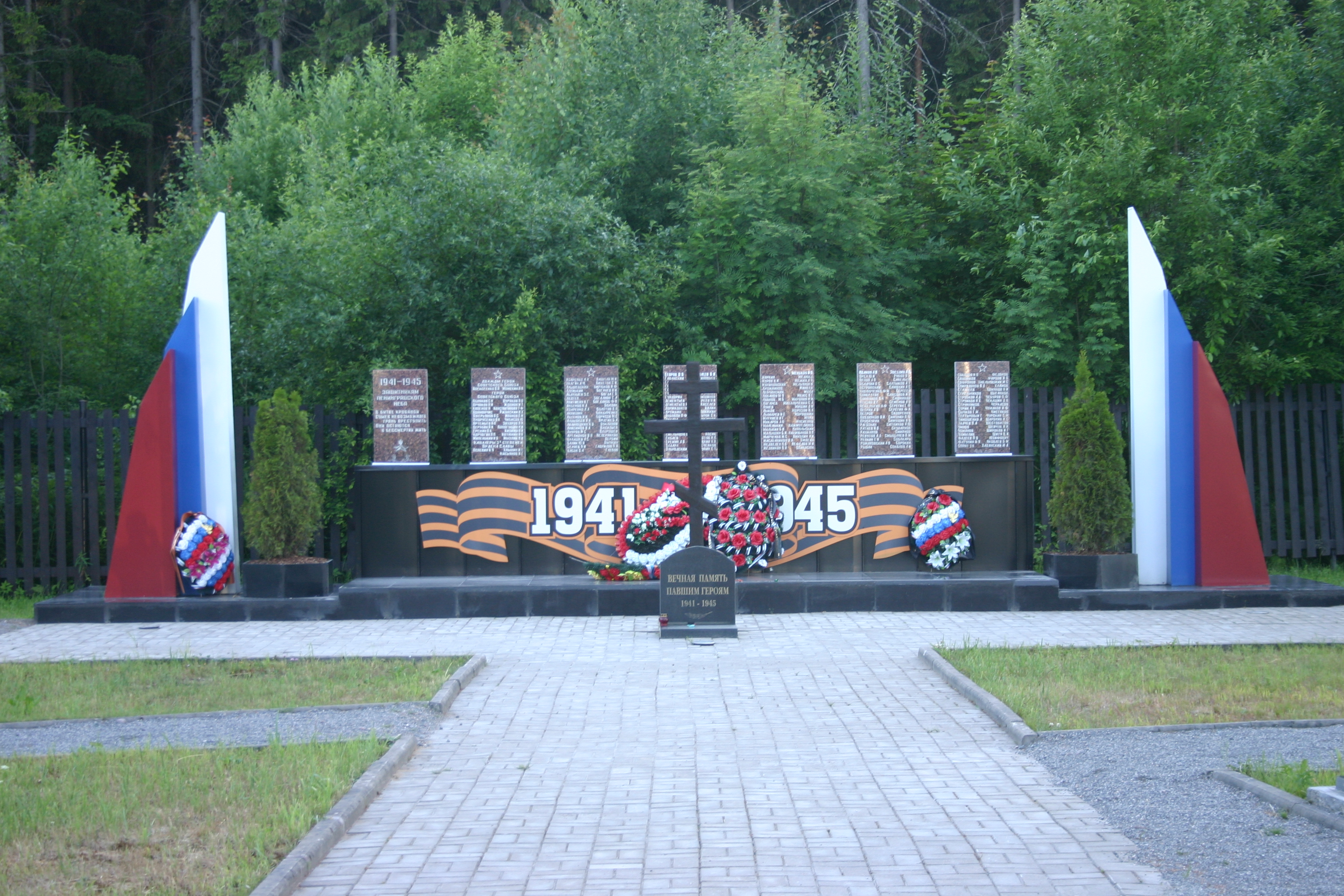
- Interactive map of Agalatovo
- Location of Agalatovo Agalatovo (Leningrad Oblast)
- Coordinates: 60.2203°N 30.2987°E
- Country: Russia
- Federal subject: Leningrad Oblast
- Administrative district: Vsevolozhsk District
- Rural settlementSelsoviet: Agalatovskogo Rural Settlement
- Elevation: 84 m (276 ft)

Population
  - Estimate (2021): 6,249 )

Administrative status
  - Capital of: Agalatovskogo Rural Settlement
- Time zone: UTC+3 (MSK)
- Postal code: 188653
- Dialing code: +7 81370
- OKTMO ID: 41612408101

Agalatovo (Russian: Агала́тово; Finnish: Ohalatva) is a rural locality (a selo) in Vsevolozhsk District of Leningrad Oblast, Russia. It is the 6th Combined Arms Army garrison.

== Demographics ==
=== Population ===
As of 2019, the population of Agalatovo was 5,497.

=== Ethnicity ===
According to the 2002 census, the ethnic composition of Agalatovo was:

- Russians – 4,034 (79.8%)
- Ukrainians – 403 (8.0%)
- Belarusians – 141 (2.8%)
- Tatars – 68 (1.4%)
- Other – 407 (8.1%)
