= Siege of Breslau =

1945 siege of the German city of Breslau during World War II

- Part of the Eastern Front of World War II
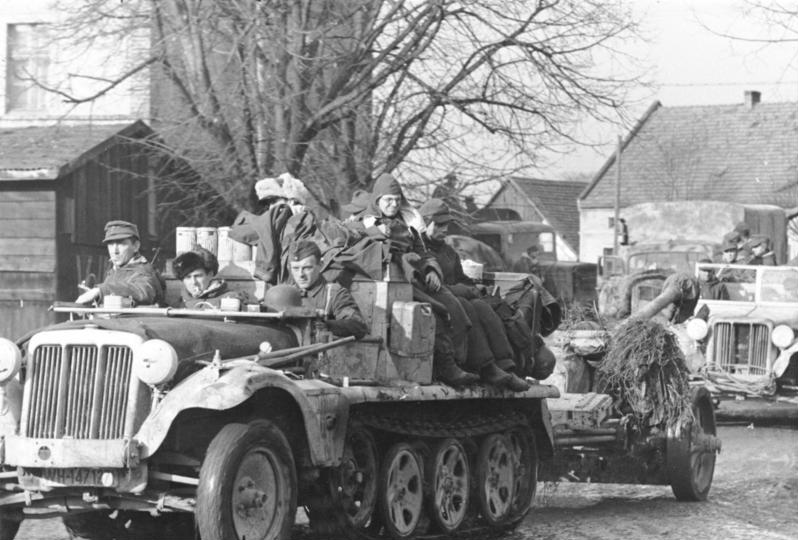
- German troops in Breslau on 2 February 1945
Date	13 February – 6 May 1945 (2 months and 24 days)
Location	Breslau, Nazi Germany (now Wrocław, Poland) 51°07′N 17°02′E
Result	Soviet victory

Belligerents
Soviet Union: (German Empire) National Committee for a Free Germany	Germany

Commanders and leaders
6th Army: (Soviet Union) Vladimir Gluzdovsky	Festung Breslau: (Nazi Germany) Hans von Ahlfen; (Nazi Germany) Hermann Niehoff

Strength
(Soviet Union) 87,334	(Nazi Germany) 50,000

Casualties and losses
31,604: 7,177 – 13,000 killed; 24,427 – 33,000 wounded	44,848 captured, including 6,678 – 12,000 hospitalised

The siege of Breslau, also known as the battle of Breslau, was a three-month-long siege of the city of Breslau in Lower Silesia, Germany (now Wrocław, Poland), lasting to the end of World War II in Europe. From 13 February 1945 to 6 May 1945, German troops in Breslau were besieged by the Soviet forces which encircled the city as part of the Lower Silesian Offensive Operation. The German garrison's surrender on 6 May was followed by the surrender of all German forces two days after the battle.

== Background ==
In August 1944, Adolf Hitler declared the city of Breslau a fortress (Festung), and ordered that it must be defended at all costs. He named Karl Hanke, Gauleiter of Silesia since 1941, to be the city's "Battle Commander" (Kampfkommandant).

On 19 January 1945, the civilian population was forced to leave. Many thousands died in the bitter cold of the makeshift evacuation; many more arrived in Dresden. The German Army, aided by the Home Guard (Volkssturm), then turned the city into a military fortress: Breslau was to be capable of a lengthy defense against the advancing Soviets. A large area of the city center was demolished and turned into an airfield. Late in January, a regiment of Hitler Youth (Hitler-Jugend) was sent to reinforce the garrison of Festung Breslau. SS regiment "Besslein" (which included volunteers from France and the Netherlands) also took part.

On 2 February 1945, Hanke presented colors to the newly formed Home Guard units in Breslau. On the same day, Major General Hans von Ahlfen became the garrison commander of Fortress Breslau. Ahlfen, who commanded for only three weeks, had been personally selected by the Commander-in-Chief of Army Group Center (Heeresgruppe Mitte), Ferdinand Schörner.

== Prelude ==
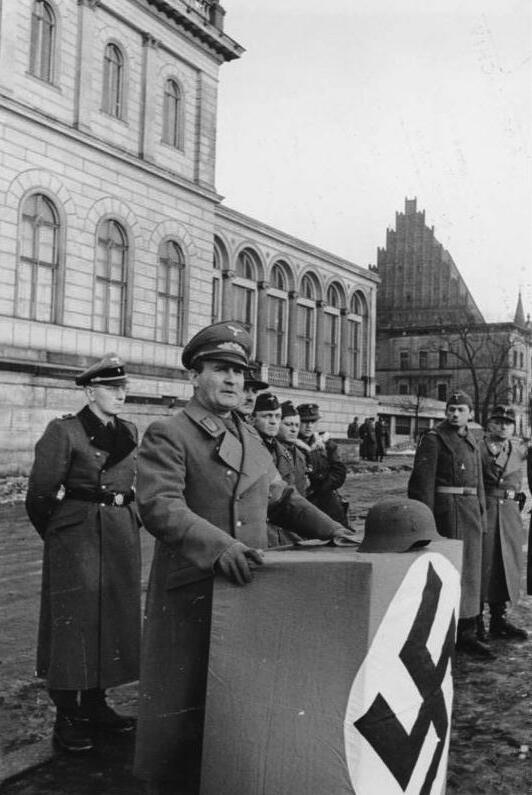
Gauleiter Hanke addresses a new battalion of Volkssturm in Breslau, February 1945.

The capture of a bridgehead on the west bank of the Oder by the 1st Ukrainian Front during the Vistula–Oder Offensive allowed the Soviet forces to encircle Breslau. Breslau fell in the sector of the Soviet 6th Army, commanded by Lieutenant General Vladimir Gluzdovsky. Gluzdovsky, who had been relieved of his army command for his performance in positional fighting in eastern Belarus during the winter of 1943–1944, commanded the 6th Army on a secondary attack axis during the Vistula–Oder Offensive. Marshal of the Soviet Union Ivan Konev, commander of the 1st Ukrainian Front, in a 31 January directive, ordered the 6th Army to attack the rear of the German forces defending Breslau, and to capture the city within four days of the beginning of the attack, part of the Lower Silesian Offensive. The Breslau attack was not a priority for Konev, as the same directive also tasked his troops with reaching the Elbe and capturing Berlin. However, the capture of Breslau would secure a crucial road junction, ensuing uninterrupted supply of the front.

The start of the attack of the 6th Army was delayed for two days, from 6 to 8 February, by the overstretched supply lines of the front, which resulted from the advances it made during the Vistula–Oder Offensive. Due to a lack of rail transport, fuel and ammunition had to be transported from the right bank of the Vistula to the Oder bridgeheads by road. Despite securing vehicles from the units defending the bridgehead, the 6th Army scraped together just 170 vehicles to transport 350 tons of ammunition and 180 tons of fuel. By the morning of 8 February, artillery and mortar units had enough ammunition for between two and five units of fire and infantry guns enough for between one and a half and two units of fire. The only tank support for the army was provided by the 7th Guards Mechanized Corps of Lieutenant General Ivan Korchagin, which late on 7 February fielded 186 T-34 tanks, and 21 each of the ISU-122 and SU-76 self-propelled gun, and the SU-85 tank destroyer – almost at its authorized strength. Only six T-34s were listed as under repair.

=== Encirclement of Breslau ===
Nearly an hour of artillery bombardment, begun at 08:35 on 8 February, preceded the start of the 6th Army attack. Elements of the 7th Guards Mechanized Corps crossed to the bridgehead, accompanied by the artillery bombardment, and by 12:00 its first echelon, which consisted of the 24th Guards Mechanized and 57th Guards Tank Brigades, outran their infantry support and advanced into the rear of the German defenses. The two forward brigades ran into fierce German resistance on the railway line from Breslau to the southwest on 10 and 11 February, with the 25th Guards Mechanized Brigade and 57th Guards bogged down at the Domslau station and Koberwitz village and station, respectively. They suffered heavy losses in tanks and men to German tanks and artillery, as well as panzerfausts fired from house basements. Combining their attacks, the 25th and 57th Guards broke through between Domslau and Koberwitz, but were stopped. During the same days, the corps' 24th and 26th Guards Mechanized Brigades, holding defensive positions, were struck by a German tank counterattack between Gross-Baudis and Kostenblut; the latter attempted to break through to Breslau and prevent the encirclement, although the failure of the Soviet attack soon made further counterattacks meaningless.

The 24th and 26th Guards Brigades were relieved by the 309th Rifle Division, fresh from the fighting at Liegnitz, early on 12 February. The bringing up of infantry units strengthened the Soviet defense on the outer edge of the partial encirclement. Another German counterattack, involving the 8th and 19th Panzer Divisions as well as Volkssturm and flak units, began at 18:20 on that day, lasting until 13 February; this extended from Kostenblut to Kanth, to the east of the 10–11 February counterattack as the former was the narrowest part of the encirclement, where the outer and inner rings were separated by only 30 kilometers. It achieved temporary success with the capture of Gross Peterwitz, but was soon pushed back to its jumping-off positions by a Soviet counterattack on its flank. The German situation further deteriorated with the arrival of the 273rd Rifle Division, which approached the fighting from the west and north, pushing the German forces further to the south and taking up defensive positions on the line of Strigauer Wasser river, securing the outer encirclement ring. At 14:00 on 13 February, the 309th Rifle Division, after repulsing the German counterattack, began advancing on Breslau from the southwest.

At 08:00 on 13 February a patrol from the corps' 25th Guards Mechanized Brigade discovered a self-propelled artillery regiment of the 5th Guards Army in Rotsurben, a road junction to the south of Breslau. The encirclement was closed when the brigade's 12th Tank Regiment linked up near Rotsurben with the 252nd Tank Brigade of the 31st Tank Corps of the 5th Guards Army. A last breakout attempt was made on the night of 13–14 February by elements of the 269th Infantry Division and other units trapped in Breslau, who attacked the inner ring of the encirclement. Simultaneously, the 19th Panzer Division again attacked the outer ring, with both German forces meeting in the area of Tinz. Two brigades of the 7th Guards Mechanized Corps were involved in heavy night fighting, only restoring their positions by 11:00 on 14 February. The brief corridor created by the German attack enabled the escape of civilians trapped in Breslau in addition to the German soldiers, according to German historian Rolfe Hinze. With the city having been declared a fortress, thousands of forced laborers from local prisons and concentration camps were brought in to build defenses and clear rubble. Many would be executed or would die in the crossfire.

== Siege ==
The infantry units of the 6th Army consolidated the advances of the 7th Guards Mechanized Corps between 14 and 16 February, solidifying the inner ring of the siege. The 7th Guards Mechanized Corps was withdrawn on the night of 15 February due to a German counterattack in the Strigau area; by the evening of 14 February, Korchagin's command was down to 108 T-34s, nine ISU-122s, seventeen SU-85s, and thirteen SU-76s, showing its heavy losses in the encirclement of Breslau. In preparation for the transfer of the 5th Guards Army to another sector, its 294th Rifle Division, advancing on Breslau from the east, was transferred to the 6th Army. The latter also received the 77th Fortified Region from the 52nd Army, which defended the northern bank of the Oder. Beginning on 18 February, the 273rd Rifle Division and the reserve regiments of the 6th Army began relieving the units of the 5th Guards Army to the southeast of Breslau; the composition of the 6th Army remained unchanged for the rest of the siege. The 6th Army besieged the city with the 22nd and 74th Rifle Corps, and the 77th Fortified Region, as well as other smaller units. 50,000 German troops defended the city.

Meanwhile, 22nd Rifle Corps commander Major General Fyodor Zakharov ordered his unit at midday on 14 February to capture the southwestern part of the city and advance to the city center by the end of the day. However, the corps' attacks on the Breslau outskirts in the following days proved unsuccessful. The 309th overcame the Lohbrück–Opperau line, while the 218th Rifle Division took Krietern; the German resistance rendered a speedy advance to the city center in a day unfeasible. The 218th began an attack on the key railway embankment in the southwest of the city on 18 February and captured it on the next day, bringing the Soviet forces within two miles of the city center. The 667th Rifle Regiment of the 218th advanced into the Südpark but was forced to retreat back to the railway line on 20 February by a counterattack of the 55th Volkssturm Battalion, made up of Hitler Youth, supported by the garrison's assault guns. An exaggerated account of the Hitler Youth counterattack was published in the Nazi propaganda newspaper Völkischer Beobachter in an attempt to show the resolution of the defenders.

Failing to storm the city, Gluzdovsky paused to prepare a thoroughly planned attack. According to the plan prepared by his headquarters on 18 February and approved by Konev a day later, the main attack on the city would be delivered from the south along a two-and-a-half kilometer front from Oltashin to the Südpark with the 273rd and 218th Divisions, reinforced by two regiments from the 309th, forming the shock group; these units comprised the army's strongest divisions in terms of manpower, with the 218th and 309th numbering little more than 5,000 men and the 273rd with slightly above 5,400. Despite being at about half of the authorized strength like many Red Army units by this point in the war, these divisions were well equipped with submachine guns, reflecting Soviet infantry tactics, but had a shortage of heavy and light machine guns. Artillery totalling 572 guns was massed in the attack sector. A secondary attack was ordered on both banks of the Oder to eliminate the German defenses that extended along the river to the northwest. By the end of the first day of the attack, the shock group was planned to advance to the city center and reach the Stadtgraben, the old city moat. Another day was given for the storming of the central island as well as the university, post office, and telegraph. The intelligence directorate of the 6th Army estimated German strength at 18,060, with 141 guns and 45 tanks and assault guns at its disposal. To support the assault, the 280 mm mortars of the 315th Battalion were transferred from the northern sector to the southern sector of the 22nd Rifle Corps. The plan assumed that the forces involved would be ready by 20 February.

For the attack, one assault battalion in each regiment was specially formed for urban combat, totalling ten in the entire shock group, including the 22nd Rifle Corps reserve. Each assault battalion was ordered to include a rifle battalion, two 152 mm guns, and either two ISU-152 self-propelled guns or 203 mm guns, a battery of 76 mm guns, and a sapper group with demolitions, a sapper group with obstacle clearing equipment, a group of backpack flamethrowers, a group of anti-tank riflemen, a sniper group, a machine gunner group, and a group of soldiers armed with captured Panzerfausts. For example, the three assault battalions of the 273rd totalled 872 men, with roughly half armed with submachine guns. The ISU-152s were drawn from the understrength 349th Guards Heavy Self-Propelled Artillery Regiment, Gluzdovsky's only armored force, which fielded eight combat-ready self-propelled guns with six under repair on 19 February. The 6th Army headquarters further recommended that subordinate commanders form assault groups integrating single rifle companies with artillery – operating in direct fire mode – and sappers to capture fortified strongpoints.

On the night of 21–22 February, the forces of the 6th Army regrouped and took up jumping off positions for the impending assault. At this time, the 273rd had only two regiments present as the third was still marching into the city from the Strigau area. The divisions of the 22nd Rifle Corps advanced in the traditional manner – two rifle regiment in the first echelon and the third in the second. The assault began at 08:00 with an artillery preparation of two hours and forty minutes. Between 22 and 23 February the 315th Battalion fired 113 280 mm shells, at a relatively short range of four to 5.5 kilometers.

The siege of Breslau consisted of destructive house-to-house street fighting. The city was bombarded to ruin by artillery of the Soviet 6th Army, as well as the Soviet 2nd Air Army and the Soviet 18th Air Army, and the destruction caused by the German defenders.

On 15 February, the German Luftwaffe started an airlift to the besieged garrison. For 76 days, until 1 May, the Luftwaffe made more than 2,000 sorties with supplies and food. More than 1,486 tonnes (1,638 short tons) of supplies were delivered. On 2 March, Infantry General Hermann Niehoff replaced Ahlfen as garrison commander. Niehoff held the position until the final surrender on 6 May 1945. On 22 February, 6th Army occupied three suburbs of Breslau, and during the next day, the 6th Army troops were in the southern precincts of the city itself. By 31 March there was heavy artillery fire into the north, south, and west of Breslau suburbs. On 4 May the clergy of Breslau – Pastor Hornig, Dr. Konrad, Bishop Ferche, and Canon Kramer – demanded that Niehoff surrender the town. Hanke ordered Niehoff not to have any further dealings with the clergy.

=== Involvement of the NKFD ===
Local German communists called for an end to the resistance of the city in flyers. In a pamphlet titled the "Freiheits-Kämpfer" (freedom fighters) it called for an end to the fighting and told the local population "not to be afraid of the Red Army who came as liberators". Seventeen members of the resistance group were executed on Gauleiter Hanke's orders.

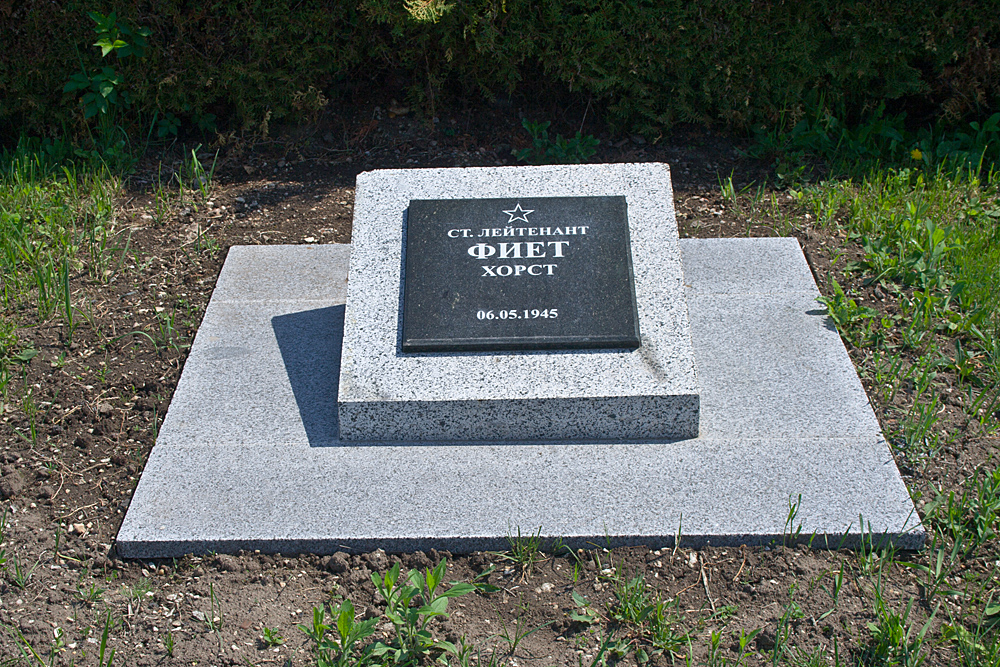
Grave of Lieutenant Horst Viedt killed in combat with the Wehrmacht on 5 May

In May 1945, a small Combat Group (German: Kampfgruppe) of the National Committee for a Free Germany (NKFD), an organization formed mostly of the German POWs in the USSR, took part in combat on the side of the Red Army. It was one of the small units sent for reconnaissance and infiltration of German troops and subsequent disarmament and capture of the latter, or for auxiliary combat operations. Throughout 1944, NKFD created commandos, and as 1945 began, it was allowed for the NKFD to form companies; members of the Combat Groups carried German weapons and were dressed in Wehrmacht uniforms. The group sent to Breslau consisted of approximately 80 people; upon arrival, they pretended to be scattered Wehrmacht soldiers. The group successfully overpowered the guard posts, liquidated the SS commanders and persuaded the other German troops to surrender. Heavy combat took place which resulted in casualties on both sides, and the operation of the NKFD failed in its main objectives. Lieutenant Horst Vieth was killed on 5 May while leading the Kampfgruppe in this combat.

== Surrender ==
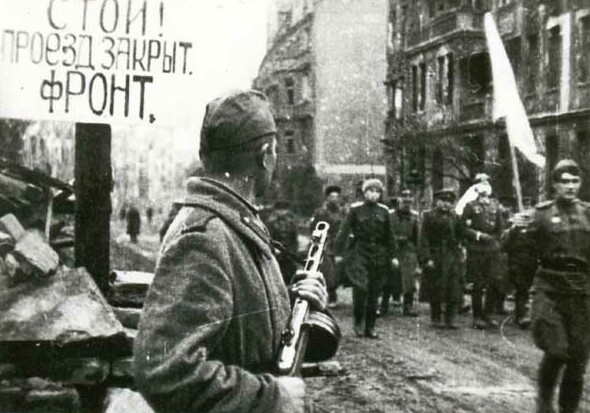
Delegation of German officers walking to negotiations for the capitulation of Festung Breslau, 6 May 1945

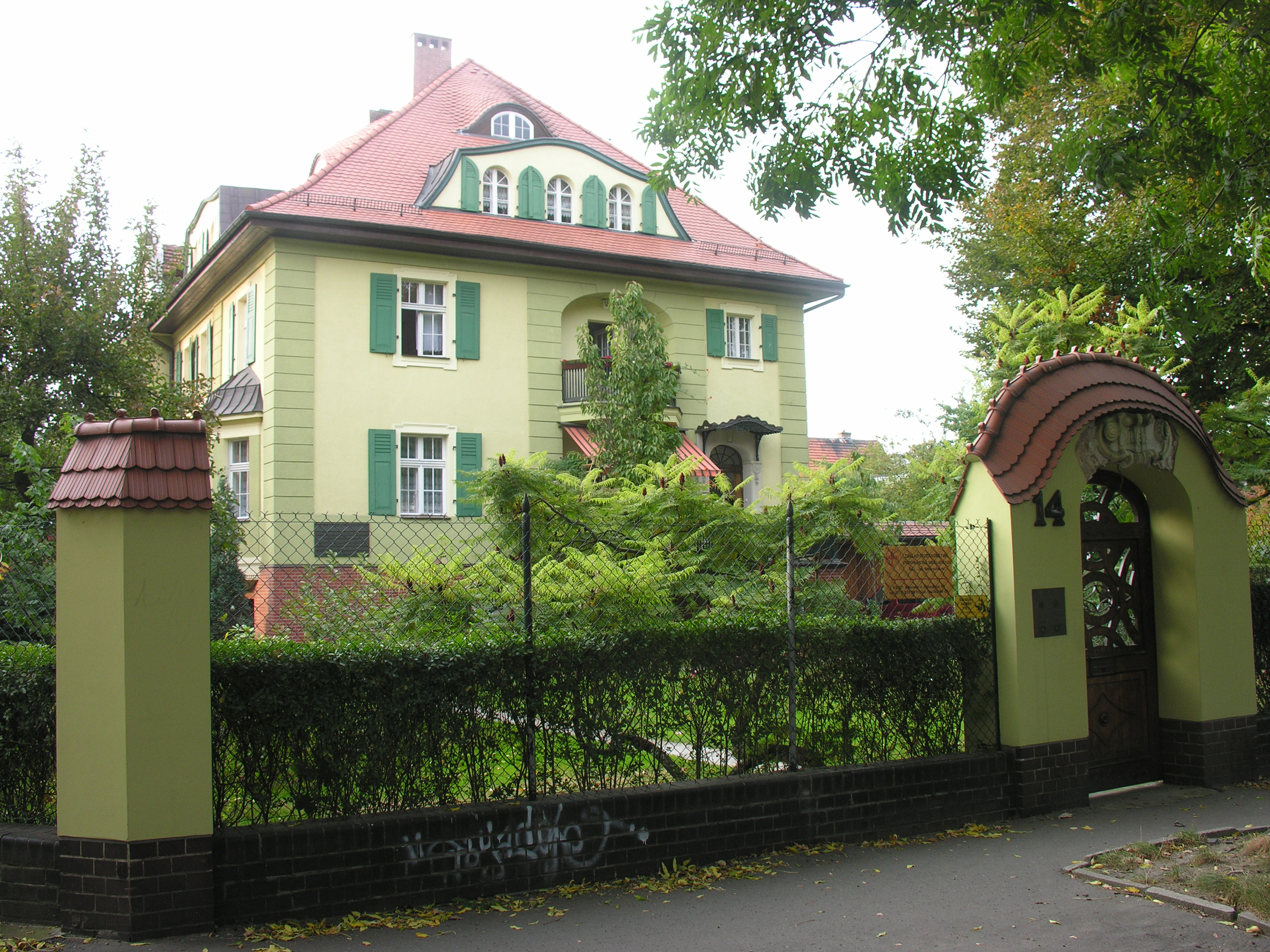
Villa Colonia at Rapacki Street 14 (former Kaiser-Friedrich-Strasse), where the instrument of surrender for the Breslau garrison was written

Hanke flew out to Prague on 5 May in a small Fieseler Storch plane kept in reserve for General Niehoff. On 6 May, after 82 days of siege and shortly before the unconditional surrender of Germany in World War II, General Niehoff surrendered Festung Breslau to the Soviets. During the siege, German forces lost 6,000 dead and 23,000 wounded defending Breslau, while Soviet losses were possibly as high as 60,000. Civilian deaths amounted to as many as 80,000. Breslau was the last major city in Germany to surrender, capitulating only two days before the end of the war in Europe. Gauleiter Hanke had fled to Prague by the time of the city's surrender.

Hanke attached himself to the 18th SS-Freiwilligen-Panzer-Grenadier-Division "Horst Wessel" in the uniform of an SS private, to conceal his identity in the event of capture. The group surrendered to Czech partisans on 6 May and were marching when a train passed their route. Hanke and several other POWs ran to the train and clung on to it. The Czechs opened fire, with Hanke falling first while two other POWs slumped on the track. They were then beaten to death with rifle butts.

== Aftermath ==
Not only because of Soviet aerial and artillery bombardment, but also as a result of the self-destructive actions of the SS and the NSDAP, 80 to 90 per cent of Breslau was destroyed . . . after the Soviet capture of the Gandauer airfield, the Wehrmacht destroyed many houses and three churches to build a provisional airstrip 200 to 400 meters wide and two kilometers long.

— August 1945 report of damage to Breslau by employees of the Saxony state administration

Breslau was transferred to Poland in the aftermath of the war and renamed Wrocław. Most of the German inhabitants in Wrocław fled or were forcibly expelled between 1945 and 1949 and moved to Allied Occupation Zones in Germany. A small German minority still remains in the city. The post-war Polish mayor of Wrocław, Bolesław Drobner, arrived in the city four days after the surrender, on 10 May, finding the city in ruins.

== See also ==
- Courland Pocket
- German World War II strongholds
- Prague Offensive
- Second Army (Poland)
- SS Fortress Regiment 1
