= 371st Infantry Division =

371st Infantry Division: 371. Infanterie-Division
- Active: 17 February 1942 - 8 May 1945
- Country: Nazi Germany
- Branch: Army
- Type: Infantry
- Size: Division
- Nickname: Ähren-Division
- Engagements: World War II: Battle of Stalingrad; Kamenets-Podolsky pocket; Lvov–Sandomierz Offensive; Upper Silesian Offensive

Commanders
- Notable commanders: Hermann Niehoff

The 371st Infantry Division, (German: 371. Infanterie-Division) was an infantry division of the German Army during World War II, active from 1942 to 1945 in two separate instances.

== History ==
The 371st Infantry Division, part of the nineteenth wave of infantry divisions formed during the war, was formed at Beverloo Camp in Belgium on 17 February 1942 under the command of the 15th Army. The division nominally fell within the responsibility of Wehrkreis VI (military district VI) and had a home station at Münster.

The division sent to the Eastern Front in June 1942 and was annihilated during the Battle of Stalingrad on 31 January 1943 while subordinated to the 6th Army.

The division was re-established on 17 February 1943 in Brittany from recovered soldiers and replacement troops and reached again full division strength on 9 June 1943. The division was then initially entrusted with coastal protection tasks in Italy and were in December 1943 moved to Croatia to participate in anti-partisan operations.

The 371st Infantry Division was assigned to 2nd Panzer Army from early December 1943 until late January 1944, having been placed there after pressure by Oberbefehlshaber Südost on OKW to strengthen the 2nd Panzer Army with additional forces. The addition of forces was intended to reverse gains made by the National Liberation Army since the announcement of the Armistice of Cassibile on 8 September 1943, after which the Royal Italian Army had largely ceased fighting against the Yugoslav partisans.

From the Balkan theater, the division was deployed to northern Ukraine, Poland and Upper Silesia, where it fought in several defensive battles.

At the end of the war, the division surrendered to the Soviets in the Iglau – Deutsch-Brod area in the present-day Czech Republic.

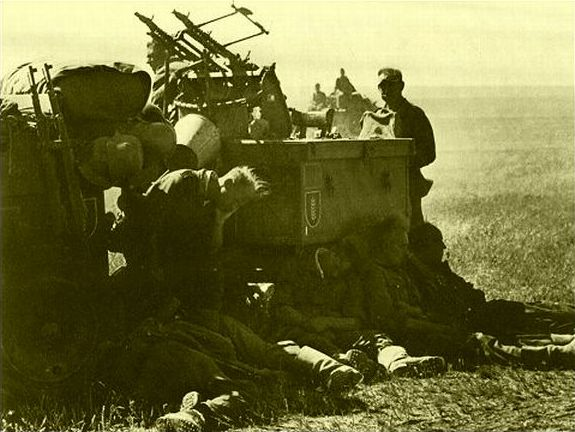
Advance of the 371. Infantry Division to the east towards Stalingrad

== Commanding officers ==
- Generalleutnant Richard Stempel : 1. April 1942 - 26 January 1943 (suicide to avoid surrender)
- Generalleutnant Hermann Niehoff : 1. April 1943 - 10 June 1944
- Generalmajor Hans-Joachim Baurmeister : 10 June - 10 July 1944
- Generalleutnant Hermann Niehoff : 10 July 1944 - 2 March 1945
- Generalmajor Rolf Scherenberg : 2 March 1945 - 8 May 1945
