= 86th Infantry Division (Wehrmacht) =

- 86. Infanterie-Division
- 86. Infanterie Division Vehicle Insignia
- Active: 26 August 1939 – 3 November 1943
- Country: Nazi Germany
- Branch: Army
- Type: Infantry
- Size: Division
- Garrison/HQ: Altenburg

Commanders
- Notable commanders: Helmuth Weidling

The German 86th Infantry Division (German: 86. Infanterie-Division) was created on 26 August 1939. The division was disbanded on 3 November 1943.

== Commanding officers ==
- General der Infanterie Joachim Witthöft, 26 August 1939
- General der Artillerie Helmuth Weidling, 1 January 1942

== Order of battle ==
- Infanterie-Regiment 167
- Infanterie-Regiment 184
- Infanterie-Regiment 216
- Artillerie-Regiment 186
- Divisionseinheiten 186
