= Georg Pfeiffer =

German General and Knight's Cross recipient (1890–1944)

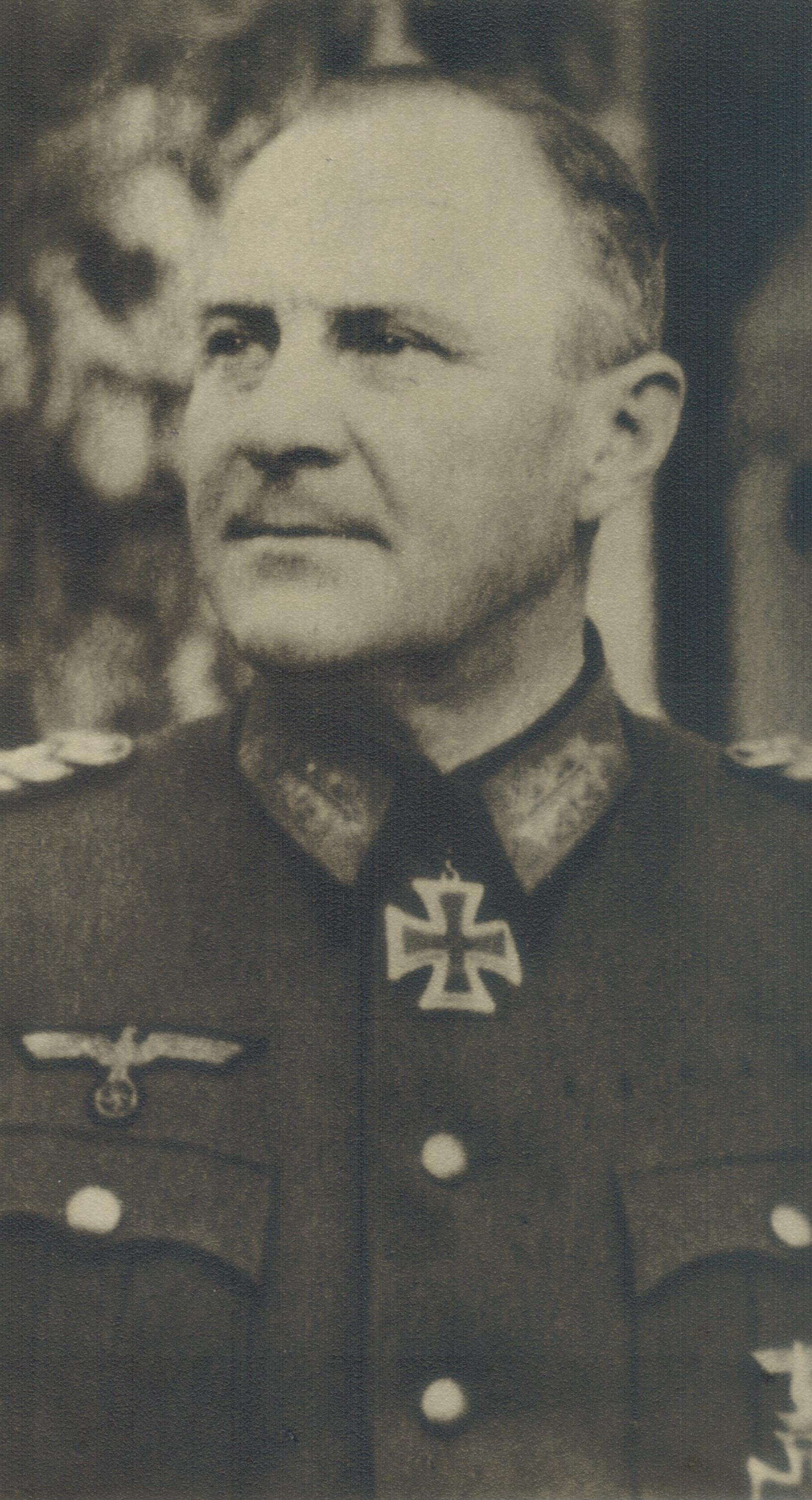
- Born: 5 May 1890; Wendessen near Wolfenbüttel, Duchy of Brunswick, German Empire
- Died: 28 June 1944 (aged 54); Mogilev, Eastern Front, Soviet Union
- Relatives: ∞ Käthe Klara Sophie Fleck
- Military career
- Allegiance: German Empire; Weimar Republic; Nazi Germany
- Branch: Prussian Army; Imperial German Army; Reichsheer; Police; German Army
- Service years: 1909–1914; 1914–1918; 1919–1920; 1920–1935; 1935–1944
- Rank: General of the Artillery
- Commands: 94th Infantry Division; 306th Infantry Division; VI Army Corps
- Conflicts: World War I World War II: Invasion of Poland; Battle of France; Operation Barbarossa; Battle of Kiev (1941); Battle of Stalingrad; Italian Campaign; Battle of Monte Cassino; Mogilev Offensive †
- Awards: Knight's Cross of the Iron Cross

Georg Gustav Pfeiffer (5 May 1890 – 28 June 1944) was a general in the Wehrmacht of Nazi Germany who commanded the VI Army Corps. He was a recipient of the Knight's Cross of the Iron Cross. Pfeiffer was killed in a Soviet air attack on 28 June 1944 at Mogilev during Operation Bagration, the Soviet 1944 summer offensive.

Pfeiffer had served as a police officer, including as a member of the Weimar Sicherheitspolizei, from 1920 to 1935.

== Promotions ==
=== Army ===
- April 1909 Fahnenjunker (Officer Candidate)
- 1909 Fahnenjunker-Unteroffizier (Officer Candidate with Corporal/NCO/Junior Sergeant rank)
- 19 November 1909 Fähnrich (Officer Cadet)
- 22 August 1910 Leutnant (2nd Lieutenant) with Patent from 22 August 1908
- 25 February 1915 Oberleutnant (1st Lieutenant)
- 27 January 1918 Hauptmann (Captain)

=== Police ===
- 3 January 1920 Polizei-Hauptmann (Captain of the Police)
- 1 April 1924 Polizei-Major (Major of the Police)
- 1934 Polizei-Oberstleutnant (Lieutenant Colonel of the Police)

=== Wehrmacht ===
- 1 October 1935 Oberstleutnant (Lieutenant Colonel) with Rank Seniority (RDA) from 1 June 1934
- 1 August 1936 Oberst (Colonel)
- 1 June 1940 Generalmajor (Major General)
- 1 June 1942 Generalleutnant (Lieutenant General)
- 1 May 1944 General der Artillerie (General of the Artillery)

== Awards and decorations ==
- Iron Cross (1914), 2nd and 1st Class
- Honour Cross of the World War 1914/1918 with Swords
- Wehrmacht Long Service Award, 4th to 1st Class on 2 October 1936
- Repetition Clasp 1939 to the Iron Cross 1914, 2nd and 1st Class
  - 2nd Class in October 1939
  - 1st Class in July 1940
- German Cross in Gold on 17 January 1942
- Winter Battle in the East 1941–42 Medal on 2 August 1942
- Referenced by name in the Wehrmachtbericht on 3 July 1944
- Knight's Cross of the Iron Cross on 16 January 1943 as Generalleutnant and Commander of the 94. Infanterie-Division

== Sources ==
- German Federal Archives: BArch PERS 6/22647 and PERS 6/300343

Military offices
Preceded by General der Infanterie Helmuth Volkmann	Commander of 94. Infanterie-Division; 21 August 1940 – 29 January 1943	Succeeded by Destroyed at Stalingrad
Preceded by Reconstituted after Stalingrad	Commander of 94. Infanterie-Division; 1 March 1943 – 2 January 1944	Succeeded by Generalleutnant Bernhard Steinmetz
Preceded by General der Infanterie Hans Jordan	Commander of VI. Armeekorps; 20 May 1944 – 28 June 1944	Succeeded by General der Artillerie Helmuth Weidling
