= Pinozero =

Pinozero Пинозеро
- Railway station
- Interactive map of Pinozero
- Location of Pinozero Pinozero (Murmansk Oblast)
- Coordinates: 67°19′N 32°30′E
- Country: Russia
- Federal subject: Murmansk Oblast
- Administrative district: Kandalakshsky District
- Territorial OkrugSelsoviet: Nivsky Territorial Okrug

Population (2010 Census)
  - Total: 149
  - Estimate (2021): 24 (−83.9%)

Municipal status
  - Municipal district: Kandalakshsky Municipal District
  - Urban settlement: Kandalaksha Urban Settlement
- Time zone: UTC+3 (MSK)
- Postal code: 184071
- OKTMO ID: 47608101131

Pinozero (Russian: Пинозеро) is a rural locality (a railway station) in Kandalakshsky District of Murmansk Oblast, Russia, located beyond the Arctic Circle at a height of 105 meters (344 ft) above sea level. Population: 149 (2010 Census).
