= Army Group A =

- German: Heeresgruppe A
- Active: 26 October 1939 – 22 June 1941; 7 July 1942 – 5 April 1944; 23 September 1944 – 25 January 1945
- Country: Nazi Germany
- Branch: Heer ( Wehrmacht)
- Size: Army group
- Engagements: Battle of France; Battle of Sedan; Battle of Arras; Battle of Dunkirk; German occupation of France; Eastern Front; Case Blue; Battle of the Caucasus; Operation Edelweiss; Kuban Bridgehead; Kerch–Eltigen operation; Nikopol–Krivoi Rog offensive; Odessa offensive; Bereznegovatoye offensive; Vistula–Oder offensive

Commanders
- Commanders: Gerd von Rundstedt; Wilhelm List; Adolf Hitler; Ewald von Kleist; Hubert Lanz; Ferdinand Schörner; Josef Harpe
- Staff chiefs: Erich von Manstein; Georg von Sodenstern; Hans von Greiffenberg; Alfred Gause; Hans Röttiger; Walther Wenck; Wolf-Dietrich von Xylander

Army Group A (German: Heeresgruppe A) was the name of three distinct army groups of the Heer, the ground forces of the Wehrmacht, during World War II.

The first Army Group A, previously known as "Army Group South", was active from October 1939 to June 1941 and notably served in the Battle of France as the decisive army group in the implementation of the "Sickle Cut" military plan that inflicted crushing subsequent defeats on the French armed forces at occasions such as the Battle of Sedan, Battle of Boulogne and Battle of Dunkirk and that ultimately led to the Armistice of 22 June 1940. Army Group A was subsequently used in the German occupation of France and temporarily became the first Oberbefehlshaber West in German-occupied France. It was eventually replaced in this function by Army Group D and redeployed to German-occupied Poland in preparation for Operation Barbarossa. At the commencement of that attack, Army Group A was renamed "Army Group South" on 22 June 1941, ending the first deployment.

The second Army Group A was inserted into the German line on 7 July 1942, when Army Group South was split during the German 1942 summer offensive ("Case Blue") into Army Group B in the north (directed towards Stalingrad) and Army Group A in the south (directed towards the Caucasus). It advanced towards the Terek river, but was eventually forced to withdraw by the winter of 1942/43, concurrent with the decisive defeat of Army Group B in the Battle of Stalingrad. Initially confined to the Kuban bridgehead and the Crimean peninsula, Army Group A fought a rearguard action against the Red Army during its westwards withdrawal through Ukraine. On 2 April 1944, it was renamed "Army Group South Ukraine".

The third and final Army Group A came into existence on 23 September 1944, when the previous Army Group North Ukraine was renamed "Army Group A". It existed for about five months that were marked by constant withdrawals from the advancing Red Army and eventually left Army Group A at the Oder river line. On 25 January 1945, Army Group A was one of several army groups to be renamed, receiving the designation "Army Group Center". No subsequent Army Group A was formed.

== First deployment, 1939–41 ==
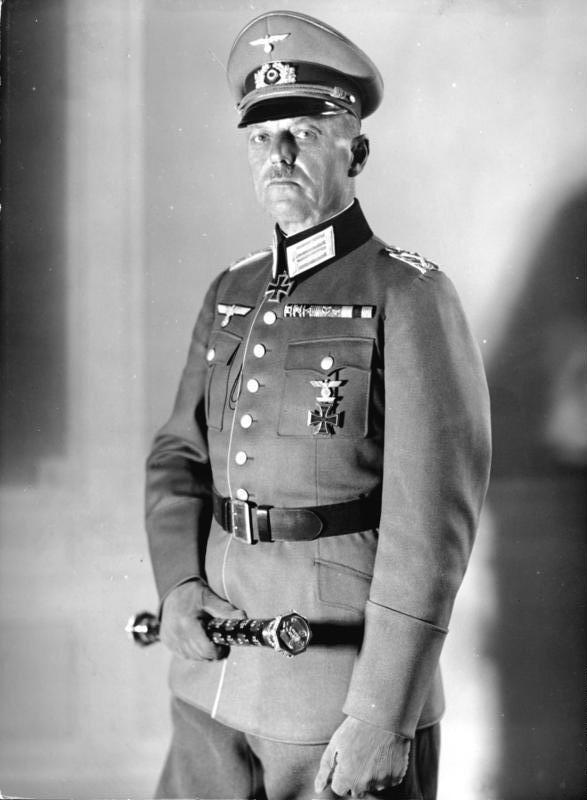
Gerd von Rundstedt, first commander of Army Group A

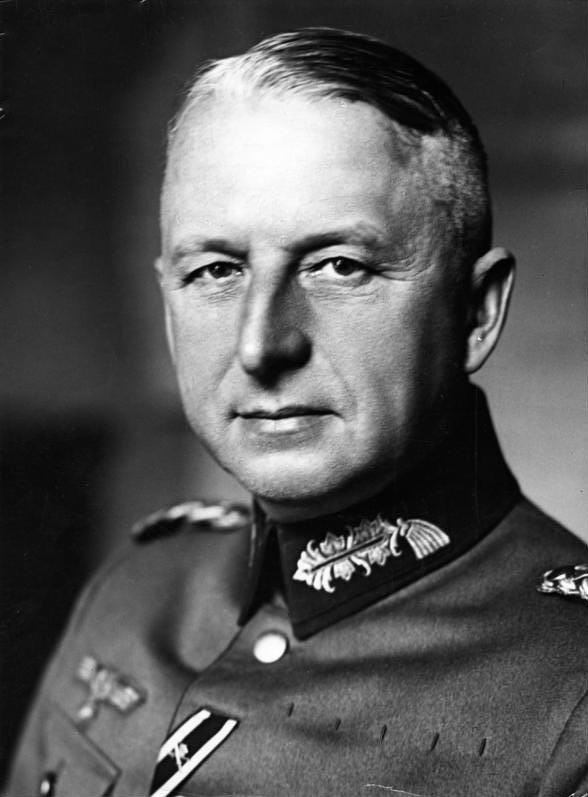
Erich von Manstein, first chief of staff of Army Group A

Army Group A was formed, through the redesignation of Army Group South, on 26 October 1939 in the central sector of Germany's western frontiers, along the France–Germany border and Belgium–Germany border, in the broader area of the Eifel and Hunsrück mountain ranges. Under its previous name, the army group had fought in the Invasion of Poland in September and October 1939. The initial commander and chief of staff of Army Group A were the same persons who held these portfolios during the time of Army Group South in Poland, Gerd von Rundstedt as commander and Erich von Manstein as chief of staff.

=== Preparations for the Battle of France ===
Enthusiasm among the higher echelons of Army Group A for a repetition of the armored thrusts of the Poland Campaign was initially limited; Army Group A chief of staff Georg von Sodenstern predicted as late as 5 March 1940 that a repetition of the swift advances through what was estimated to be a well-developed French defensive line was less than likely.

Nonetheless, the military preparations that the Wehrmacht ultimately settled for in regards to the upcoming Western Campaign was in accordance with the "Manstein Plan", developed by then-chief of staff of Army Group A Erich von Manstein on his post in the Koblenz Electoral Palace, where the HQ of Army Group A was then located. Manstein had developed the first drafts of his conception in late October 1939 upon his first receival of the original deployment plan against France. Whereas this original plan envisaged to place the focus of operations with the northernmost army group, Army Group B, Manstein instead demanded that the focus be shifted towards Army Group A and the German center. In total, Manstein issued seven memoranda (31 October, 6 & 21 & 30 November, 6 & 12 December, 12 January) arguing for his proposal in various ways. As Manstein's insistence annoyed the army's general chief of staff, Franz Halder, he was removed from the position of Army Group A chief of staff and instead moved to the command of the upcoming XXXVIII Army Corps, thus eliminating him from a major command post in the upcoming campaign. The Mechelen incident in January 1940, which provoked a response by the Allied armies and allowed the Germans to observe the Allied defensive movements, gave additional credibility to the Manstein Plan, as it made the encirclement of Allied forces in the Low Countries appear plausible.

The Manstein Plan found its way to Hitler's desk through the interventions of Günther Blumentritt, Henning von Tresckow and Rudolf Schmundt, and Hitler received Manstein for a private meeting on 17 February 1940 in Berlin. Hitler, who found thought experiments that he had himself had in the previous weeks confirmed in Manstein's more elaborate presentation and ordered its implementation, resulting in a complete shift of plans by OKH, placing the German Schwerpunkt southwards in accordance with the Manstein Plan. Nonetheless, even though Franz Halder was eventually swayed, many detractors remained. Especially the commander of Army Group B (the army group that stood to lose the most materiel from the change of plans), Fedor von Bock, believed the change of military focus to be an irresponsible gamble. Additionally, the implementation of the plan was not helped by the fact that Halder's intrigue to replace Manstein had resulted in the appointment of Georg von Sodenstern as chief of staff of Army Group A. A conservative-minded planner, von Sodenstern had initially been selected by Halder precisely because he opposed the Manstein Plan, and was now left to oversee its realization. Indeed, there were now serious reservations in the upper echelons of Army Group A whether or not the motorized and armored formations should truly be in the vanguard during the advance, or whether it would not be preferable to attack with the infantry first. Such doubts were voiced by von Sodenstern, Blumentritt, and notably by army group commander Gerd von Rundstedt himself. This scepticism was not shared by the advocates of rapid armored assaults, such as Heinz Guderian of XIX Army Corps.

Army Group A would be equipped with 4th Army, 12th Army, 16th Army and Panzer Group Kleist, commanded by generals Kluge, List, Busch and Kleist, respectively. This assignment left the army group with four out of the eight field-army level commands assigned to the three army groups along the western frontier. Each of these armies as well as the panzer group were equipped with three army corps each, placing the army group at a total of twelve army corps. Additionally, Army Group A also received the concentration of German armored and motorized formations, as 5th and 7th Panzer Divisions (XV Corps, Hoth) were assigned to 4th Army and 1st, 2nd, 6th, 8th and 10th Panzer Division (divided among XXXXI Corps (Reinhardt) and XIX Corps (Guderian)) assigned to Panzer Group Kleist. Additionally, Panzer Group Kleist also received the 2nd, 13th and 29th Motorized Infantry Divisions (divided among XXXXI Corps and XIV Corps (von Wietersheim). In total, this left Army Group A with seven panzer divisions and three motorized infantry divisions, compared to just three each for Army Group B further north and none of either type for Army Group C in the south. Whereas Army Groups B and C had 29 1/3 and 17 divisions, respectively, Army Group A was equipped with 44 1/3 divisions, leaving it as the clear Schwerpunkt of the German thrust. Additionally, most of the 42 available reserve divisions were earmarked to support Army Group A rather than either of the other two army groups. The overall task of Army Group A was to breach the Meuse river line between the cities of Sedan and Dinant using a rapid breakthrough of motorized formations and to then advance towards the Somme river estuary. In this, 4th Army was to cross the Meuse at Dinant, the 12th Army at Sedan. The 16th Army was to protect the southern flank from Allied counterattack, whereas the 2nd Army, initially posted in reserves, would be used to follow the advancing 4th and 12th Armies. Once the latter turned towards the Somme estuary, 2nd Army could then be used to cover the spaces vacated by the two other armies. Panzer Group Kleist was to carry the momentum and speed of the assault, receiving a total of 41,140 motorized vehicles including 1,222 tanks (around half of the entire German tank arm's stock) spread across two armored corps and one motorized infantry corps, with a total personnel strength of 134,370. This left Panzer Group Kleist as by far the strongest single motorized formation ever used in warfare up to this point. However, Panzer Group Kleist fell victim to a strange compromise that was caused in no small part by its novelty factor: Rundstedt allowed the panzer group to initially operate autonomously, but placed the condition that it would be placed subservient to either of the infantry armies if it managed to catch up to the panzer group. As a result, the leadership of Panzer Group Kleist had a strong incentive during the campaign for single-minded and daring operations to preserve their organizational autonomy.

=== Battle of France ===
During the Battle of France, Army Group A was pivotal in the implementation of the German breakthrough in the central sector of the front (in accordance with the "Manstein Plan"), with Army Group A forces crossing the Ardennes mountain range, and then swiftly turning northwestwards to rush towards the English Channel and trap the Allied armies in the Low Countries. In this, Army Group A (von Rundstedt) would cooperate with Army Group B (von Bock) and Army Group C (von Leeb), all under the joint supervision of OKH.

4th Army advanced on the army group's right flank (with 6th Army of Army Group B as its right-hand neighbor) from the Monschau sector along the Liège—Namur axis as well as towards Dinant. To its left, 12th Army stood in the army group's center, with its initial thrust directed from the Prüm sector via northern Luxembourg towards Neufchâteau (Belgium) and then towards the Meuse river. Furthest in the south, the 16th Army held the army group's left flank and aimed to advance from the Trier—Merzig sector over Luxembourg City towards Longuyon. In its entire sector, Army Group A developed a large numerical advantage, advancing its own 45 divisions through territories held by only 18 enemy divisions.

Within days of the beginning of the campaign, the troops of Army Group A achieved what one of the army group's staff officers, Günther Blumentritt, would later refer to as a "three-fold miracle": The Allied air forces failed to attack the lengthy tank columns that were stuck for hours on end in traffic jams trying to cross the Ardennes, the Germans succeeded with high speed and low casualties to cross the Meuse river with the breakthrough in the Battle of Sedan, and the German tank divisions finally won a stunning victory in what was at times a more than reckless advance towards the channel coast, dangerously abandoning the cover of the German thrust's flank against a potential Allied counterattack that never materialized.

There was a repeated tendency during the early days of the campaign where the Army Group A high command and the political leadership would advocate caution, but their instructions overruled and ignored by the divisional and corps commanders on the ground. Georg-Hans Reinhardt of XXXXI Corps ignored a direct order by the army group and instead advanced with his troops out of their bridgehead at Monthermé. A similar action was undertaken by Heinz Guderian of XIX Corps, who on 14 May was dissatisfied with the prospect of Army Group A leadership using his tanks to safeguard the bridgehead rather than to exploit the momentary disarray in the French army's rear. The leader of the panzer group, Ewald von Kleist, found himself in the difficult situation of mediating between his superior army group and his subordinate corps commanders; Kleist had initially covered Reinhardt's autonomous actions but was forced on 17 May to give a definitive holding order to Guderian, as Hitler personally had decreed a deceleration of the armored advance. This order remained in place until 19 May.

When the operational delay of 17 May was revoked on 19 May, the tanks' thrust into the Allied rear continued. There was temporary panic among Army Group A higher-ups when on 21 May, a British attack hit the exposed German flank at Arras, resulting in the Battle of Arras. This attack was however repelled within hours. The first German forces had already reached the channel coast at 02:00 in the morning on 20 May, when 2nd Rifle Regiment of 2nd Panzer Division reached Noyelles-sur-Mer. This left the northern sector of the French Army, the Belgian Army and the British Expeditionary Force cut off in the Low Countries.

Western front, 21 May – 4 June

By 24 May, the Germans had encircled the critical channel ports of Boulogne-sur-Mer and Calais and were just 15 km off the last partially unobstructed port that the encircled Allied forces could use, Dunkirk, where the Allies began to rapidly implement an evacuation of their forces. Particular historical interest has been given to a sequence of events on 24 May 1940 known as the "halting order" (German: Haltebefehl), where the armored formations were ordered to halt outside of Dunkirk and to instead prioritize infantry formations in the Battle of Dunkirk. Popular imagination of both German and Western Allied postwar observers was captured by the idea that the German tanks might have inflicted horrific casualties on the encircled and tightly packed Allied infantry, if they had not been stopped by undue meddling by higher military command. Hitler had personally insisted on the preservation of the remaining tank forces on 24 May, overruling even Walther von Brauchitsch, the commander-in-chief of the German army, after a worrying 23 May report by Ewald von Kleist had placed the casualties of his panzer group at "over 50%". Hitler in this concurred with the leadership of Army Group A and went against the intuition of von Brauchitsch, who even attempted to transfer the 4th Army away from Army Group A to insist on his own vision. Due to a coincidence, Hitler happened to be present at Army Group A headquarters on 24 May, and overruled Brauchitsch's instructions, implementing instead the "halting order". The halting order was revoked on 26 May and Dunkirk captured on 4 June. While the British army had been forced to leave behind much of its heavy equipment (including 475 tanks), some 340,000 British and Allied soldiers were successfully evacuated out of Dunkirk.

After the Allied evacuation at Dunkirk, Army Group A tuned southeast and advanced in the general direction of the Vosges mountains and the France–Switzerland border, thus encircling the static French forces positioned along the Maginot Line.

=== Occupation of France ===
On 10 October 1940, Army Group A became the first army group upon whose commander the designation of Supreme Commander in the West was bestowed, thus placing them in charge of the military dimension of the German occupation of France. On 15 April 1941, this responsibility was passed to Army Group D. Army Group A had in the meantime been repurposed on 1 April 1941 and earmarked for deployment to German-occupied Poland.

=== Preparations for Barbarossa ===
Starting on 1 April 1941, Army Group A was assigned the cover name Section Staff Winter (Abschnittsstab Winter), later changed to Section Staff Silesia (Abschnittsstab Schlesien), to prepare for Operation Barbarossa, the German invasion of the Soviet Union. On the day that this offensive began, 22 June 1941, Army Group A was formally renamed "Army Group South", thus ending the first deployment of Army Group A.

== Second deployment, 1942–44 ==
Army Group A was prepared for a second deployment starting on 24 April 1942, when an army group organization with the cover name Staff Anton (Stab Anton) was formed in the German homeland. This cover name was later adapted to become Coastal Staff Azov (Küstenstab Asow) on 22 May. On 7 July 1942, Army Group South, which was currently advancing towards the Caucasus and southwestern Russia as part of the German summer offensive 1942 ("Case Blue"), was split to be divided between two army groups to be newly inserted into the line, Army Group A and Army Group B. This split resulted from additional considerations by Adolf Hitler, who hoped to multiply the offensive gains made by Army Group South by splitting its offensive thrust in two. Whereas Army Group B was to take over the northern sector and the German thrust to the Volga that would climax in the Battle of Stalingrad, Army Group A, under command of Wilhelm List, was assigned to the southern sector of the former Army Group South and placed in charge of the advance into the Caucasus.

=== Edelweiß, the advance into the Caucasus ===
On 23 July 1942, the day that German forces captured Rostov-on-Don in the Battle of Rostov, Hitler issued Führer Directive No. 45, making the split of Army Group South permanent by finalizing the orders to be issued to each of the two army groups. Army Group A was assigned the execution of Operation Edelweiss (Unternehmen Edelweiß). The task was to destroy the retreating Soviet forces that had survived the engagement at Rostov and to subsequently capture the Soviet Black Sea coast and to thus deny the Black Sea Fleet its bases. The ultimate goal of the operation was placed at Batumi on the Soviet-Turkish border. Concurrently, Army Group B was to advance to the Don line, secure the Don river, reach the Volga river at Stalingrad, capture that city and subsequently advance to Astrakhan on the Caspian Sea to settle into a defensive line from the Don via Stalingrad and the Volga to Astrakhan. Hitler's split of the operation into two divergent attacks had significant implications on the distribution of forces; it especially weakened Luftwaffe air support, as the overstretched aerial formations were now forced to cover two army groups with the tendency to increase rather than decrease their distance from each other.

On 1 August, Army Group A was equipped with the 1st German Panzer Army (von Kleist), the 17th German Army (Ruoff) and the 3rd Romanian Army (Dumitrescu) and received air support from elements of Luftflotte 4 (von Richthofen). 1st Panzer Army was equipped with four corps (including three panzer corps), 17th Army fielded three corps and the Romanian 3rd Army had two corps, leaving Army Group A at a total strength of nine army corps of German or Romanian nationality.

On 26 August, Army Group A's commander Wilhelm List caused Hitler significant anger by dispatching an urgent warning to either choose between immediate reinforcement for his army group or his army group's preparations of winter positions. Hitler then dispatched Alfred Jodl to List's HQ on 7 September, hoping that Jodl would find List to have to some degree failed his duties. When Jodl instead returned to Hitler with a report of List as a faithful and conscientious commander, Hitler subsequently flew into rages against Jodl and then against List, ending in the latter's dismissal on 9 September. Instead of naming another officer to succeed him, Hitler then proceeded to assume direct command of Army Group A himself. He would hold this command until 22 November.

=== Withdrawal from the Caucasus, 1942/43 ===
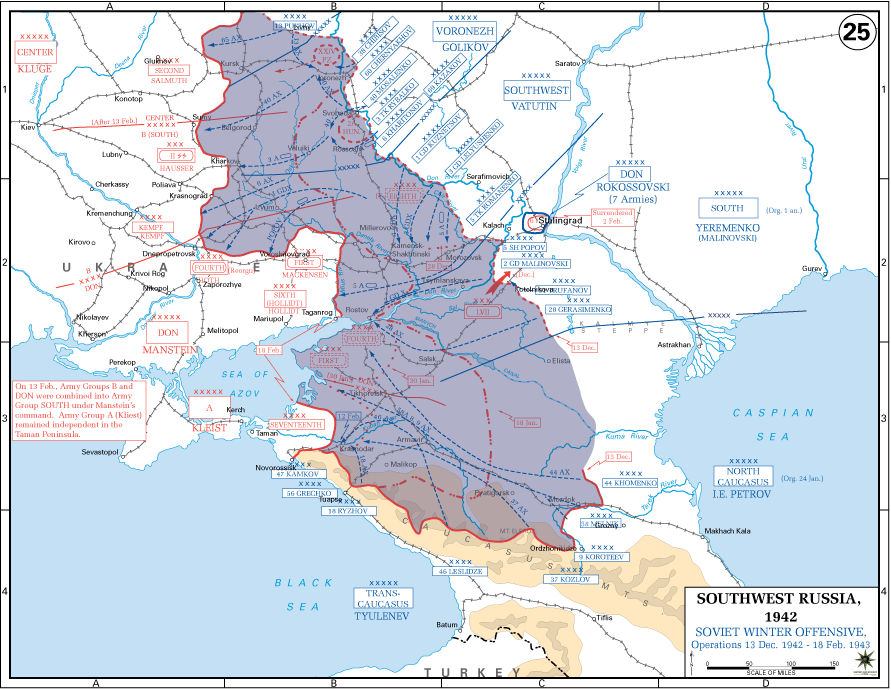
Soviet advances in the winter of 1942/43, Army Group A is visible in the southern sector of the front.

As the Soviet Operation Uranus encircled parts of Army Group B in the cauldron of Stalingrad, Army Group A (along with Army Group Don) became the target of intensive Soviet offensive preparations. On this background, Hitler gave up direct command of the army group and instead named Ewald von Kleist, until then in command of 1st Panzer Army (where he was succeeded by Eberhard von Mackensen), to lead Army Group A as commander. By December 1942, there was a desperate desire among higher-ranking German officers to withdraw the forces of Army Group A, still partially south of the Terek river, to the Don river and thus to more defensible ground. Hitler initially resisted the idea of withdrawal, but the partial collapse of the central sectors of Army Group B in December 1942 made the withdrawal critically urgent and Kurt Zeitzler was at last allowed to order the retreat. However, Hitler continued to intervene in the withdrawal operations, and forbade the full retreat behind the Don. Instead, 1st Panzer Army was ordered to split its forces, leading a northern segment across the Don at Rostov and placing a southern segment in the Taman Peninsula, thus creating the Kuban bridgehead.

=== Kuban, 1943 ===
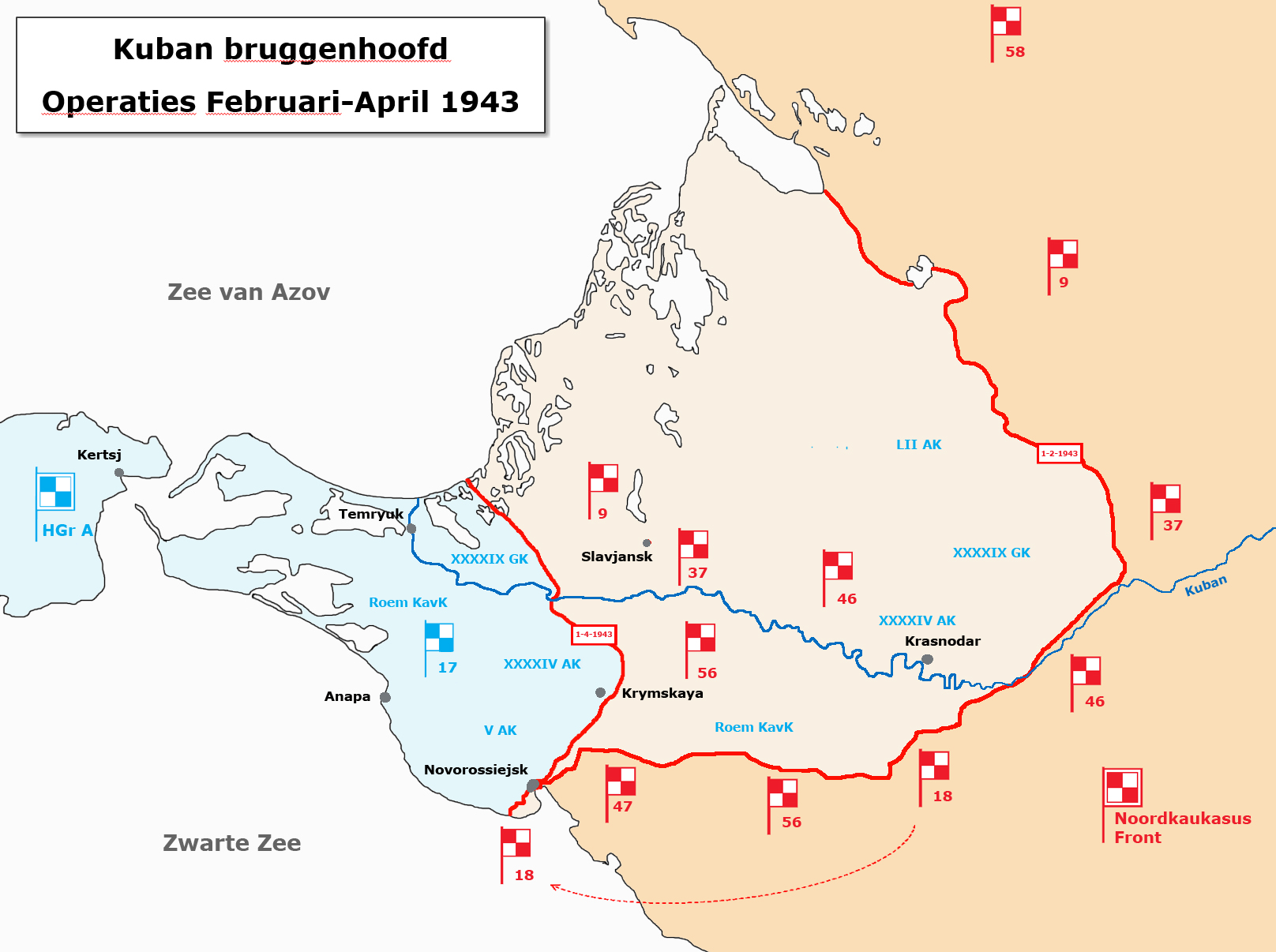
Kuban bridgehead, February – April 1943

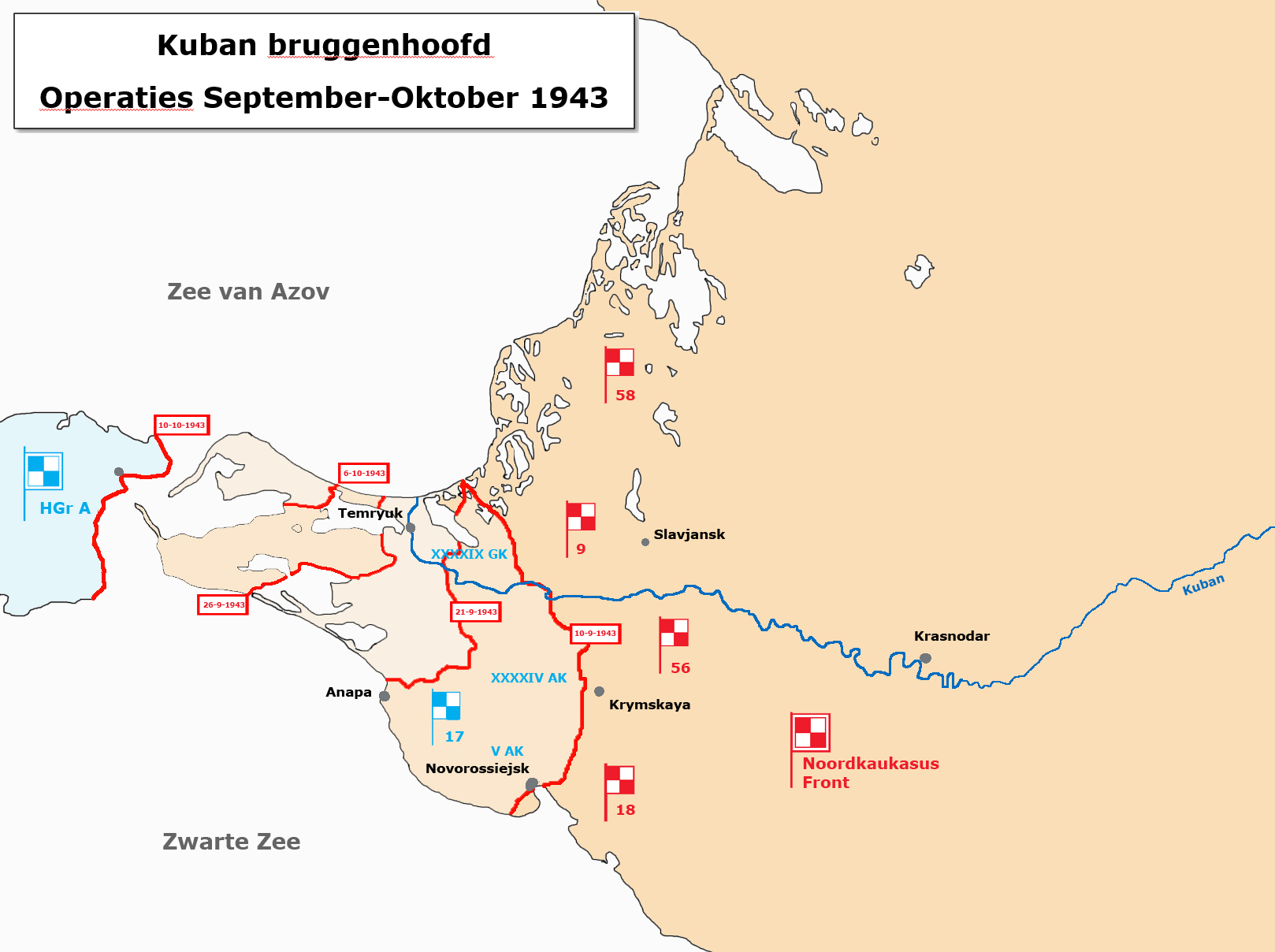
Kuban bridgehead, September/October 1943

As a result of this split, a broad reorganization of army groups was implemented on 27 January 1943. Army Group A had to transfer the northern group of 1st Panzer Army (including the army's command) as well as four additional divisions to Army Group Don, whereas the southern group of 1st Panzer Army in the Kuban Bridgehead was detached and added to 17th Army. Army Group A was assigned the task to hold the Kuban bridgehead and to defend the Crimean peninsula from Soviet threat. The strategic idea cherished by Hitler was to hold the Kuban bridgehead long enough to commence a major offensive in summer of 1943 in order to recapture the Maykop oil fields. Additionally, Hitler feared that a loss of the Kuban bridgehead and a subsequent loss of the Black Sea coast might lead neutral Turkey as well as two of Germany's allies, Bulgaria and Romania, to reconsider their respective diplomatic alignments to the disadvantage of Germany. The Luftwaffe additionally feared the loss of well-developed air strips.

Between the detachment of 1st Panzer Army in January and the addition of 6th Army in October, Army Group A consisted only of the 17th Army as well as several German command posts concerned with the defense of the Black Sea region, such as "Commander Crimea" and "Commander Kerch Strait".

The Soviets applied additional pressure through the execution of amphibious landings at Novorossiysk on 4 February. The 83rd Naval Rifle Brigade, 255th Naval Rifle Brigade and 165th Rifle Brigade were deployed to Myskhako, where they were divided by the sea and the Novorossiysk urban area from their own lines, notably the 318th Rifle Division. At this point, the Soviets pressured the line, from north to south, with 58th Army west of Lake Lebyazhiy, 9th Army between Lake Lebyazhiy and Korenovskaya, 37th Army between Korenovskaya and Voronezhskaya, 46th Army between Voronezhskaya and Starokorsunskaya, 56th Army between Shendzhy and west of Smolenskaya, and finally 47th Army between west of Smolenskaya and Novorossiysk and the city as well as the naval landing group isolated at Myskhako. The landing force managed to surprise the German garrison of Novorossiysk, roughly a third of 73rd Infantry Division, but the poorly-chosen landing ground prevented any Soviet land grabs in the immediate aftermath of the landing.

In early February 1943, Army Group A completed the withdrawal into the defenses in the Kuban bridgehead, dubbed "Goth's head position" (Gotenkopf-Stellung), assembling 20 divisions with around 400,000 troops in the Kuban and in Crimea. In coordination with Kriegsmarine landing craft and army engineer boats, Army Group A began the evacuation of superfluous troops not urgently needed in the Kuban itself towards the Crimean peninsula (in part also to reduce supply consumption in the bridgehead). 105,000 persons, 45,000 horses, 7,000 motor vehicles and 12,000 horsedrawn vehicles were thus brought to safety without major casualties. The naval craft were subsequently used to supply Army Group A across the Kerch Strait, where the initial requirement of 1,500 tons of supplies per day was soon upgraded to 4,000 tons per day. Between March and August 1943, the Germans shipped 337,353 tons of supply goods, 6,365 soldiers, 2,566 horses, 1,099 motor vehicles, 534 horsedrawn vehicles and 197 heavy guns from Crimea to the Kuban as reinforcements. These shipments were constantly under bombardment by the Soviet Air Forces.

The leaders of both Army Group A and Army Group Don would indeed have favored to concede control of the entire Kuban outright and to instead use all available forces to strengthen the line of Army Group Don further north, in order to protect the Donbas region. Opposed by the Red Army's North Caucasus Front (headquartered at Krasnodar) with five Soviet field armies, the German defenders of the Kuban bridgehead were obliged to gradually give ground. Along the line, Army Group A deployed four corps in the Kuban bridgehead itself: V Army Corps (organized as "Group Wetzel", Wilhelm Wetzel), XXXXIV Army Corps, XXXXIX Mountain Corps and Romanian Cavalry Corps, for a total of six German and two Romanian divisions in the Kuban bridgehead. Axis strength in the bridgehead numbered roughly 200,000 soldiers, and they were opposed by roughly 350,000 Soviet troops of the North Caucasus Front. Beginning in late March, air support was provided to the Germans and Romanians by the 1st German Air Corps, which helped roughly equalize the aerial balance of powers.

Whereas the frontline had run east of Kurchanskaya, Kiyevskoye, Krymskaya and Novorossiysk on 4 April 1943, all of these towns had been abandoned by 19 September. After a directive by Stavka had reached the North Caucasus Front on 16 March, the Soviet forces initially were placed on defense to prepare offensive operations, to begin in April. The first such attack was launched on 4 April, but the thrust by the 56th Soviet Army against the German XXXXIV Corps in the central southern sector did not achieve any major success and was hindered by bad weather and a lack of Soviet air support. After Georgy Zhukov had personally inspected the Soviet lines along the North Caucasus Front's field armies, he issued orders on 17 April to temporarily cease offensive operations.

Soviet attacks were resumed on 27 April, but again failed to attain any noteworthy success and had to be aborted. In the meantime, Army Group A's 17th Army had attempted its own offensive operations against the Soviet landing at Novorossiysk.

Starting in mid-September, Army Group A was assigned the task to supervise 6th Army, which was to secure the lower Dnieper river line and to thwart advances by Southern Front forces. On 4 October 1943, the entirety of Army Group A was thus organized into two field armies (6th and 17th) with a total of five corps. The ground forces assigned to this defensive task were entirely insufficient, and were further hindered in their preparations by a general Soviet aerial supremacy over the southern sectors of the frontline. The tardiness with which German planners evacuated the Kuban bridgehead and later the Crimean peninsula critically weakened the defensive capabilities of Army Group A further; the unwillingness to withdraw troops from the Black Sea bridgeheads placed the defenses on the mainland in significant peril. The weak Wotan-Stellung defensive position was soon dislodged, thus leaving Soviet encirclement of the Crimean peninsula imminent.

On 9 October at 02:00 in the morning, the German evacuation of 17th Army's forces from the Kuban peninsula was completed.

=== 17th Army's preparations in Crimea, 1943 ===
After the evacuation of the Kuban bridgehead had been completed, 17th Army was tasked with the defense of the Crimean peninsula, dubbed in Nazi parlance as "Fortress Crimea". While the commitment of 17th Army left it in danger of being cut off by a Soviet advance through Ukraine, the Crimean peninsula was deemed as an important base to project air power and to control the Black Sea and the Sea of Azov. Additionally, Crimea provided a role to play for the weakened Romanian army; 17th Army was equipped in late 1943 with only one and a half German divisions but with seven Romanian divisions. The other forces that had been freed up by the evacuation of the Kuban bridgehead had been immediately passed along to the Ukrainian mainland, where they were needed against the pressure of the Red Army.

In the second half of October, 6th Army was pushed out of the Wotan-Stellung defensive position, which made the threat of 17th Army's encirclement imminent. In this situation, the commander of 17th Army, Erwin Jaenecke, decided autonomously to initiate preparations for the evacuation of the peninsula. Both Army Group A and OKH favored Jaenecke's withdrawal plan, Operation Michael, but the evacuation was vetoed by Hitler's personal intervention, which was intensified by Hitler's order that Crimea be held on 25 October. OKH accordingly instructed 17th Army to defend Crimea even if the land connection to Axis forces were to be cut. On 28 October, Soviet armored spearheads reached the Isthmus of Perekop, where they were briefly halted. By 1 November, the connection between 6th Army and 17th Army was lost, leaving the 17th Army trapped on the Crimean peninsula. Hitler's view clashed with those of Ion Antonescu, the autocrat of Romania, whose troops made up the majority of 17th Army and who doubted the prospects of defending the isolated peninsula against strong Soviet formations and who feared similar Romanian casualties in Crimea as had been suffered at Stalingrad, which he believed to be politically unsustainable for his government. Hitler on 29 October made promises to Antonescu that the peninsula could and would be held and promised the insertion of additional German battalions by land, sea and air for the peninsula's defense. These promises were in reality completely unrealistic, but Hitler had received the support of Karl Dönitz of the Kriegsmarine on the 27th. Dönitz estimated the resupply of the 17th Army by sea to be possible, much to the annoyance of his army colleague Kurt Zeitzler, who viewed the German-Romanian position on the peninsula to be untenable. On 2 February 1944, the 17th Army trapped on Crimea consisted of the V Army Corps with the 73rd and 98th Infantry Divisions, 3rd Mountain Division and 6th Cavalry Division, the "Group Conrad" constructed around the XXXXIX Mountain Corps and the Cavalry Corps with the 10th and 19th Infantry Divisions under the Cavalry Corps and the 50th and 336th Infantry Divisions and 9th Cavalry Division under the XXXXIX Corps, and finally the 1st Mountain Corps with Fortress Commander Sevastopol and the 1st Mountain and 2nd Mountain Divisions. Additionally, the 17th Army had the 111th Infantry Division in reserve.

On 21 November, the 17th Army was informed by Army Group A command that Hitler still intended to restore the connection with Crimea, though with the caveat that neither OKH nor Army Group A could predict when such an operation would be possible, with Hans Röttiger adding his personal prediction to the dispatch that the relief of Crimea would not be possible in the near future. This uncertainty turned into impossibility when Erich von Manstein of Army Group South demanded the evacuation of the Nikopol bridgehead in January 1944, thus removing the jumping-off point from which the relief of Crimea would have had to be launched. Manstein's demands to evacuate the 17th Army to re-insert it into the line on the mainland were rejected by Hitler, who insisted on the continued defense of the Crimean peninsula.

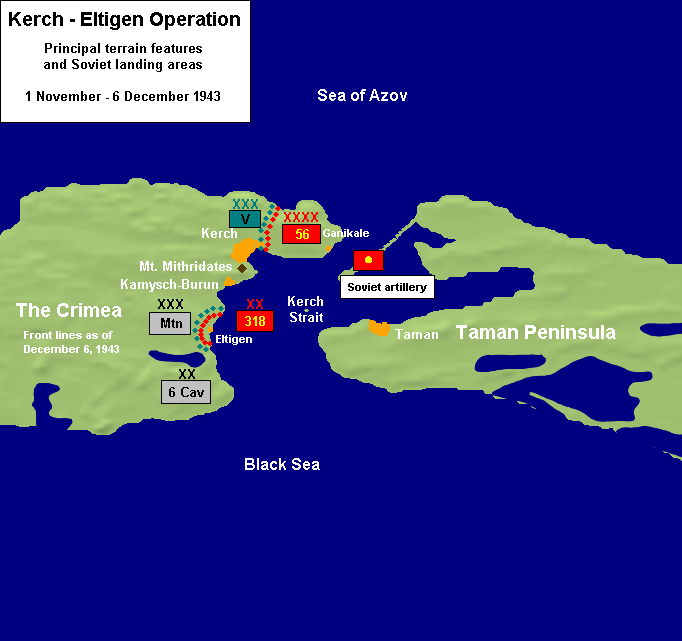
The V Corps of Army Group A's 17th Army in Crimea had to defend against the Soviet Kerch–Eltigen operation in November and December 1943.

In late October 1943, the Soviet 51st Army launched probing attacks against the Perekop isthmus, defended by XXXXIX Mountain Corps. Attack across the Syvash bay by forces of the 4th Ukrainian Front in early November could still be mostly deflected by the German defenders, though minor territorial losses had to be accepted. In early November, the Soviets also crossed the Strait of Kerch and established bridgeheads north and south of Eltigen in the Kerch–Eltigen operation. As the Soviet offensive thrust decelerated in December 1943, 17th Army command endeavored to crush the Soviet landing site. After a weeks-long blockade against the Soviet landing forces by Kriegsmarine craft, a German-Romanian counter-thrust defeated the Soviet landing forces and recaptured the bridgeheads within three days of fighting.

17th Army spent the winter of 1943/44 by establishing defenses all around the Crimean coastline using forces of XXXXIX Mountain Corps, V Corps and Romanian 1st Mountain Corps. XXXXIX Corps was charged with the defense of the Perekop isthmus and the western shore, the Romanian Mountain Corps was deployed against Soviet partisans in the mountains in the south of the peninsula, and V Corps was stationed at the Kerch peninsula to provide cover against any Soviet amphibious landing from the east. The sole reserve of the 17th Army was the Mountain Regiment Crimea (Gebirgsjägerregiment Krim), and its armored forces were limited to 45 assault guns that were to be supported in anti-tank operations by elements of the 9th Flak Division.

=== 3rd and 6th Armies' loss of Nikopol, January 1944 ===
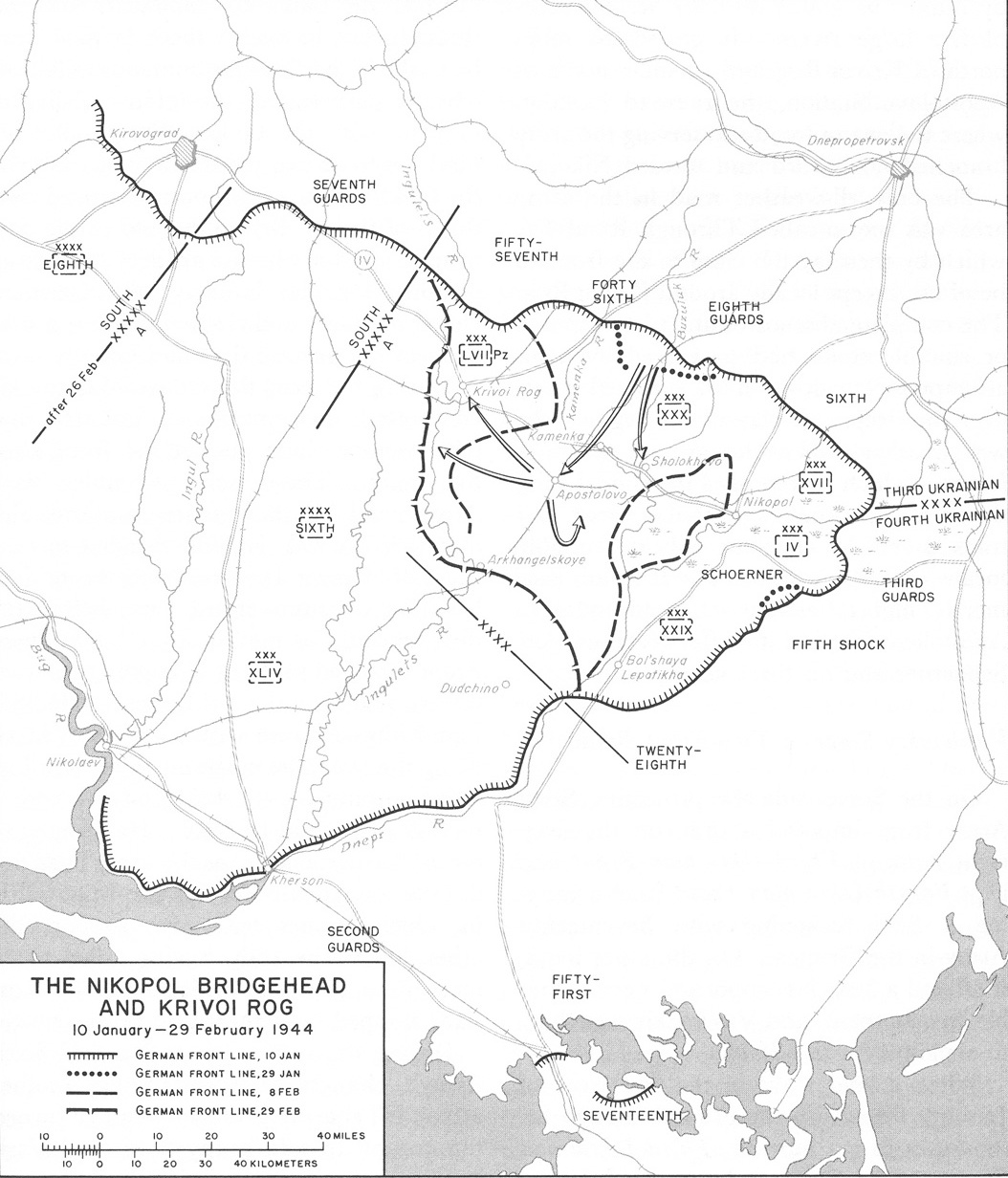
The Soviet Nikopol–Krivoi Rog offensive struck Army Group A's 6th Army from late January to late February 1944.

In the meantime, Army Group A had been nominally strengthened on the mainland in December and January 1943/44 through the addition of the 3rd Romanian Army. The 3rd Army was to cooperate with the 6th Army to defend the Nikopol ore area, which took central stage in Hitler's strategic considerations due to its manganese production (although this production had been idle for weeks due to the proximity to the warzone). On 30 January 1944, the 3rd Ukrainian Front launched a heavy assault, the Nikopol–Krivoi Rog offensive. The initial thrust east of Krivoi Rog was a diversion from the main attack, which struck two days later against Apostolove. It was in this situation that 6th Army was formally re-attached to Army Group A, which now pushed for an urgent withdrawal of all 6th Army forces to the Kamenka river line.

On 5 February, Apestolovo was captured by the Soviet 46th Army. Kleist ordered a counterattack to be launched by IV Corps on 8 February, but this counter-thrust proved entirely ineffective due to Soviet ground and air superiority and adverse weather conditions. On 10 February, Army Group A inquired to OKH about an urgent large-scale retreat to the Bug—Inhul position, which would shortened its frontline from 320 to 200 km and allowed to place three to four divisions in reserve for additional operations. But as the HQ of Army Group A at Mykolaiv waited for OKH's response, the Soviets launched another two-pronged attack against Krivoi Rog to trap LVII Panzer Corps. Army Group A issued orders to 6th Army to initiate a counterattack, and on 19 February XXIX Corps managed to restore the short-term operational integrity of the German forces in the area. The German ad-hoc formation "Group Schörner" (a combination of XXXX Corps, XXIX Corps, IV Corps, XVII Corps under command of XXXX Corps leader Ferdinand Schörner; for a total strength of 10 infantry divisions, a Jäger division and a mountain division) managed to resist annihilation, but had lost most of its heavy equipment in the process, rendering 6th Army even less capable of offensive operations than it had previously been. On 21 February, Kleist allowed 6th Army command to abandon Krivoi Rog, which was under heavy pressure by the Soviet 46th Army.

On 22 February, Hitler at last formally allowed 6th Army to withdraw (to the line Dudchina—Arkhangelskoye—Ternovatka). Until late February, 6th Army managed under significant Soviet pressure to reshape a somewhat ordered defensive line. On 26 February, 6th Army (and thus Army Group A) was expanded to include LII Army Corps, which had formerly been its left neighbor, to better coordinate the cover of the Ukrainian salient's northern flank against the 2nd and 3rd Ukrainian Fronts (who with the 7th Guards Army had advanced as far as Kirovograd). While this measure expanded the frontline of Army Group A by another 110 kilometers, it offered the chance to coordinate the defensive strategy along the entire southern sector of the Eastern Front. However, Hitler's repeated interventions in military decisionmaking again prevented a necessary withdrawal, as the LII Corps was ordered to stand its ground southeast of Kirovograd while Stavka was already preparing the next offensive step against the beleaguered Germans.

=== 6th Army's withdrawal to the Bug river ===
Army Group A inflicted significant setbacks to the 3rd and 4th Ukrainian Fronts, causing disappointment in the ranks of Stavka about the results of the Soviet winter operations of 1943/44. The Soviets had managed to push the Germans away from the Dniepr line and to recapture the Krivoi Rog—Nikopol sector with its manganese production sites, but the goal of destruction of Army Groups South and A as well as the reconquest of the entirety of Soviet Ukraine had not been attained. Whereas the 1st and 2nd Ukrainian Fronts had made significant territorial gains in northern Ukraine, the 3rd and 4th Ukrainian Fronts remained comparatively far behind. In mid-February, Stavka had been forced to reduce the operational goals issued to the 3rd and 4th Ukrainian Fronts. The 3rd Ukrainian Front under Rodion Malinovsky was repurposed to break for the significantly reduced ambition to breach the German defenses on the lower Inhulets river line and to capture the major town of Mykolaiv (where Army Group A had established its HQ). The 4th Ukrainian Front was pulled out of the mainland frontline entirely and instead tasked with the recapture of Crimea, still held by Army Group A's 17th Army.

After northern elements of 6th Army had settled into their defensive lines on the Inhulets, the Eastern Front saw a short lull in combat activity due to the rasputitsa mud season, though Army Group A high command expected the resumption of Soviet offensive operations against German lines as soon as the climate was more accommodating to such combat. OKH suspected that the southern front sector, with the weakened Army Groups South and A in exposed position, would be the focus of Soviet spring operations in 1944. This prediction came true on 3 March, when the Red Army resumed its attack against the southern part of the Eastern Front. 6th Army stood exposed, as only its left wing was west of the Inhul, the center along the Inhulets and the rightmost elements still on parts of the Dniepr line. The shoddy German defenses had not been sufficiently supplied with laborers or construction materiel to allow swift expansion, and the Soviet 3rd Ukrainian Front had used the combat pause to assemble several field armies (7th Guards Army, 8th Guards Army, 6th Army, 37th Army, 46th Army, 57th Army) for its offensive, whereas the 4th Ukrainian Front on the lower Dniepr covered the 3rd Ukrainian Front's left flank with two additional field armies (5th Shock Army, 28th Army).

Malinovsky resumed the 3rd Ukrainian Front's offensive by deploying two of his armies south and one of his armies north of Krivoi Rog and opened a new phase of the attack on 3 March. By 7 March, the Soviets were already just outside Novyi Buh, which the Germans were forced to abandon on the 8th. Army Group A reiterated its ambition to urgently withdraw the 6th Army westwards into a shortened and more compact line, but this plan was once again overruled by Hitler, who ordered on 8 March that the 6th Army would have "to hold and to close the gap". As the 6th Army attempted to attain this goal, the Soviet 8th Guards Army, having conquered Novyi Buh, turned southwest and resumed its advance towards the Dnieper–Bug estuary. This dash to the sea threatened four corps of Army Group A, still far to the east, with encirclement and complete destruction. Only on 9 March, a retreat was ordered for the forces of the Dniepr to go back to the Inhulets, after Hitler had belatedly accepted that this was required by the military situation. This delayed withdrawal robbed Army Group A of any time it could have used to build preliminary defensive lines, and placed additional pressure by the Soviets against the retreating Germans. Whereas the two corps on the German right withdrew somewhat easily and formed a bridgehead southeast of Mykolaiv on 13 March, the withdrawal from the area between Krivoi Rog and Beryslav proved to be very problematic as 8th Guards Army's vanguard reached Barmasovo on 11 March, thus blocking the route of withdrawal for the majority of 6th Army's threatened forces. It proved fortunate for the Germans, however, that Malinovsky had split his offensive thrust, leaving the 8th Guards Army alone in the Novyi Buh—Dnieper–Bug estuary sector. Under the concentrated air support of 1st Air Corps, the southern group of 6th Army broke the flank protection of the 8th Guards Army and reached until mid-March the bridgehead Mykolaiv—Trikati as well as the Bug river, where it established a preliminary defensive line. The northern group of 6th Army, "Corps Group Kirchner" (Korpsgruppe Kirchner), cooperated with the southern stragglers of Army Group South and reached a line 50 km east of the Bug river.

While Army Group A attempted desperately to escape annihilation by the 3rd Ukrainian Front, its northern neighbor, Army Group South, was heavily battered by the 2nd Ukrainian Front, which now also became a threat to Army Group A as the 2nd Ukrainian Front's forces had already crossed the Bug river that Army Group A desired to use as its defensive line. After crossing the river at Haivoron and advancing against Army Group South's backup line at Bălți—Balta—Pervomaisk, the 2nd Ukrainian Front's vanguard became a lethal threat to Army Group A, whose easternmost forces were still well short of the Bug river line. Additionally, the war had now reached the core territory of the Kingdom of Romania, rendering the political future of Hitler's most important ally, Ion Antonescu, as well as the continued support of the German Army Group A by its Romanian divisions, more than questionable.

=== 6th Army's withdrawal to the Dniestr–Iasi line and the addition of the 4th and 8th Armies ===
Army Group A gained political as well as military significance with the Red Army's advance across the Bug, as the civilian and military control of Romania's "Transnistria" Governorate, previously overseen by Gheorghe Potopeanu on behalf of Ion Antonescu, now fell to Army Group A, thus effectively ending Romanian rule in the conquered regions across the Dniestr. Army Group A still desperately attempted to stabilize the Bug river against its pursuer, the 3rd Ukrainian Front, but was threatened by the weakness of its left neighbor, Army Group South, against the advances of the 2nd Ukrainian Front. The 2nd Ukrainian Front had managed in early March west to breach the left flank of Army Group South's 8th Army west of Zvenyhorod and to thus critically sever the connection between the 8th Army and the 1st Panzer Army. This was followed in mid-March by 2nd Ukrainian Front's thrust across the Bug at Haivoron. On 19 March, the commanders of Army Groups South and A, Erich von Manstein and Ewald von Kleist, were received by Hitler at Obersalzberg to request Army Group A's withdrawal to the Dniestr and to thus free up German forces to stabilize the situation in the northern line of Army Group South. This was rejected by Hitler, who decreed that Army Group A would have to remain on the Bug river position. In the meantime, Stavka issued new orders to the 2nd and 3rd Ukrainian Fronts as well. Ivan Konev was to take the 2nd Ukrainian Front to the Prut river and to capture northern Bessarabia, whereas Malinovsky's 3rd Ukrainian Front was tasked to prevent Army Group A's 6th Army from permanently settling down on the west bank of the Bug. Additionally, 3rd Ukrainian Front was ordered to recapture Odesa and Tiraspol and to eventually reach the Prut and the lower Danube. Additionally, 4th Ukrainian Front opposite Army Group A's 17th Army in Crimea was tasked to prepare the commencement of hostilities against Crimea once 3rd Ukrainian Front captured the Mykolaiv region and advanced against Odesa.

In mid-March, 6th Army pulled back IV Corps to deploy it to the Chișinău area. At this point, 6th Army still had five corps on the west bank of the Bug river, which was now additionally threatened by 8th Guards Army's successful formation of a small Soviet bridgehead at Nova Odesa. As the situation of 8th Army worsened, 6th Army continuously pulled troops from the Bug to the Balta sector. Finally, on 24 March, Karl-Adolf Hollidt of 6th Army decided to autonomously press for the withdrawal of 6th Army from the Bug. He threatened Army Group A to order the withdrawal himself unless they did it forced, resulting in Army Group A command's decree on 25 March to withdraw German 6th Army and Romanian 3rd Army. Additionally, Ewald von Kleist also went against OKH organization and subordinated 8th Army to his own army group to better coordinate the front. One day later, the Romanian high command further strengthened Army Group A with the addition of the 4th Romanian Army. While OKH retroactively approved the subordination of 8th Army, Zeitzler refused to accept 6th Army's withdrawal from the Bug to the Dniepr and instead referred Kleist to Hitler's personal approval. Hitler surprised both generals by accepting 6th Army's withdrawal with minimal resistance, although he still insisted on 17th Army's continued presence in Crimea.

On 28 March, 6th Army's full withdrawal from the Bug commenced. Army Group A, which now contained three German and two Romanian armies, organized its left wing with the German 8th and Romanian 4th Army into the joint "Army Group Wöhler" (Armeegruppe Wöhler) under the leadership of 8th Army commander Otto Wöhler. This ad-hoc formation was in turn subordinated to the Romanian 3rd Army of Petre Dumitrescu as "Army Detachment Dumitrescu" (Armeeabteilung Dumitrescu). This organization defied military logic, as the Romanian 3rd Army was physically detached from Army Group Wöhler by the presence of German 6th Army, which was inserted in the line between the two. This rendered General Dumitrescu's task to oversee not just his own army but also the far-off Army Group Wöhler on the other flank of Army Group A as more than difficult.

Army Group A's hope to settle into a solid line along the Dniestr and Iași was soon foiled, as 6th Army's withdrawal was hindered and heavily damaged by continuous attacks by the 46th Army. The German XXIX Corps was split in two by a Soviet advance, thus rendering the plan of an organized retreat from Odesa utopian. A German counterattack failed, and Odesa had to be hurriedly abandoned starting on 9 April. The entire German line hurried, with Hitler's approval, to the west bank of the Dniestr. This move was generally complete only by 14 April (when Army Group A had already stopped existing due to its redesignation). The beginning of Soviet operations in Crimea on 8 April against 17th Army added to the pressure.

=== Redesignation ===
On 2 April 1944, Hitler decreed the redesignation of several army groups. Accordingly, Army Group A was renamed "Army Group South Ukraine" on 5 April, whereas its northern neighbor Army Group South became "Army Group North Ukraine". Both of these names were politically, rather than geographically, chosen: the two army groups had been pushed out of most of Ukraine, so Hitler signalled his willingness to reconquer Ukraine as soon as possible. A few days later, 17th Army, which for so long had formed one of the core formations of the former Army Group A, fell under heavy attack in Crimea as the 4th Ukrainian Front on 8 April began its Crimean offensive.

== Third deployment, 1944–45 ==
=== Formation ===
The final deployment of Army Group A began on 23 September 1944 in the south of German-occupied Poland and in the Carpathian Mountains when Army Group North Ukraine was renamed to become Army Group A. After the Red Army's breakthrough at the Sandomierz bridgehead and the commencement of the Vistula–Oder offensive in early January 1945, Army Group A began a general withdrawal towards the Oder river.

=== Defensive preparations ===
On 1 January 1945, Army Group A, with a total of 29 German infantry divisions, 2 German autonomous brigades and 3 Hungarian infantry divisions in the vanguard, and 5.5 German mobile divisions and a Jäger division as well as two Hungarian divisions in reserve, commanded 93,075 infantrymen on a length of 700 km (or around 133 men per kilometer), not counting the temporarily attached 1st Hungarian Army. Additionally, the entire army group possessed 1,816 artillery guns, 318 combat-ready tanks, 616 combat-ready assault guns and 793 combat-ready anti-tank cannons. All segments of the German front were outnumbered in a direct comparison between Soviet and German armored vehicles. Of the 700 km of frontline, 163 km were held by 1st Panzer Army, 128 km by 17th Army, 187 km by 4th Panzer Army and 222 km by 9th Army.

The final year of the war was marked by the overwhelming disparity of forces between the Germans and the advancing Allies; on 10 January 1945, high-ranking Luftwaffe officer Robert Ritter von Greim estimated the opposing strengths of the Allied and Axis air forces in the sectors of Army Groups Center and A to be 300 German planes versus 10,500 Allied planes, or a ratio of 35:1 in favor of the Allies.

=== Soviet winter offensive and the collapse of Army Group A ===
On 12 January 1945, the Red Army launched its major winter offensive along the entire line with the 1st Ukrainian Front and the 4th Ukrainian Front. These were joined on 13 January by the 1st Baltic Front, 2nd Byelorussian Front and 3rd Byelorussian Front with a major attack against East Prussia, and on 14 January by 1st Byelorussian Front in the center. The initial attack on 12 January at 04:00 in the morning from the Baranow bridgehead caused significant troubles in the staff of Army Group A, who had broad strategic information about Soviet avenues of attack, but lacked tactical specifics about individual Soviet divisions and corps and their respective directions of thrust. Additional trouble was caused by the cooperation between the advancing Soviet forces and the Polish Home Army, who supported the Red Army's attacks with partisan activities behind the German lines. Initial attempts at German counterattacks by the Jagdpanzers and assault guns of the XXXXVIII Panzer Corps were repelled by elite Soviet armored formations including the 3rd Guards Tank Army and 4th Guards Tank Army, as well as by the 31st Tank Corps and the 4th Guards Tank Corps.

On 17 January, the Soviet leadership reacted to the ongoing collapse of Army Group A, which was a surprise even to the Soviets, by ordering 1st Byelorussian Front to reach the line Bromberg—Posen no later than 4 February. 1st Ukrainian Front was assigned Breslau as a target, and to reach the Oder river and form bridgeheads on its west bank no later than 30 January. The 1st Ukrainian Front crossed the prewar German border on 19 January into Silesia and reached the Oder on 22 January. On the following day, the 1st Byelorussian Front captured Bromberg.

Following the disaster on the Vistula, Hitler reacted with several established themes, such as the replacement of commanders and the redesignation of army groups. The new Army Group Vistula was ordered for deployment on 21 January and assigned to Heinrich Himmler. Army Group Vistula was to be inserted in the northern sector of the mainland of the Eastern Front, to prevent the Soviet breakthrough towards Danzig and Posen. On 25 January 1945, the final deployment of Army Group A ended as Hitler renamed three army groups: Army Group A became the new "Army Group Center", the old Army Group Center became "Army Group North", and the old Army Group North, which was trapped in the Courland Pocket, became "Army Group Courland".

== Organizational history ==
=== Commanders ===
- Gerd von Rundstedt (15 October 1939 – 1 October 1940)
- Wilhelm List (10 July – 9 September 1942)
- Adolf Hitler (9 September – 21 November 1942)
- Ewald von Kleist (22 November 1942 – June 1943)
- Hubert Lanz (June – July 1943)
- Ewald von Kleist (July 1943 – 25 March 1944)
- Ferdinand Schörner (25–31 March 1944)

=== Chiefs of staff ===
- Erich von Manstein (26 October 1939 – 1 February 1940)
- Georg von Sodenstern (6 February – 1 October 1940)
- Hans von Greiffenberg (10 July 1942 – 23 February 1943)
- Alfred Gause (23 February – 13 May 1943)
- Hans von Greiffenberg (13 May – 16 July 1943)
- Hans Röttiger (16 July 1943 – 24 March 1944)
- Walther Wenck (24 March – 22 July 1944)
- Wolf-Dietrich von Xylander (28 September 1944 – 15 February 1945)

=== Subordinate formations ===
Subordinate formations of Army Group A
| Deployment | Timespan | Subordinate formations |
|---|---|---|
| First deployment | November 1939 – April 1940 | 12th Army, 16th Army |
| First deployment | May 1940 | 4th Army, 12th Army, 16th Army, (+2nd Army) |
| First deployment | June 1940 | 2nd Army, 12th Army, 16th Army, (+Panzer Group Guderian) |
| First deployment | July 1940 | 6th Army, 9th Army, 16th Army |
| First deployment | August 1940 | 9th Army, 16th Army |
| First deployment | September – October 1940 | 9th Army, 16th Army, Commander of German Troops in Holland |
| First deployment, concurrently OB West | November – December 1940 | 9th Army, 16th Army |
| First deployment, concurrently OB West | January – March 1941 | 9th Army, 16th Army |
| First deployment, concurrently Section Staff Winter/Silesia | April 1941 | 9th Army, 16th Army |
| First deployment, concurrently Section Staff Winter/Silesia | May 1941 | 6th Army, 17th Army; staff elements of Panzer Group 1, 11th Army |
| Second deployment | August 1942 | 1st Panzer Army, Army Group Ruoff (17th Army + 3rd Romanian Army), 11th Army |
| Second deployment | September – December 1942 | 1st Panzer Army, Army Group Ruoff (17th Army + 3rd Romanian Army), Commander Crimea (XXXXII Army Corps) |
| Second deployment | January 1943 | 1st Panzer Army, 17th Army, Commander Crimea |
| Second deployment | February 1943 | 17th Army, Commander Crimea |
| Second deployment | March – September 1943 | 17th Army, Commander Kerch Strait, Commander Crimea |
| Second deployment | October – December 1943 | 6th Army, 17th Army |
| Second deployment | January – February 1944 | 3rd Romanian Army, 17th Army, Commander of German Troops in Transnistria |
| Second deployment | March 1944 | 6th Army, 3rd Romanian Army, 17th Army |
| Third deployment | October 1944 | 4th Panzer Army, 17th Army, Army Group Heinrici (1st Panzer Army + 1st Hungarian Army) |
| Third deployment | November 1944 | 4th Panzer Army, 17th Army, 1st Panzer Army |
| Third deployment | December 1944 | 9th Army, 4th Panzer Army, 17th Army, 1st Panzer Army |
| Third deployment | January 1945 | 9th Army, 4th Panzer Army, 17th Army, Army Group Heinrici (1st Panzer Army + 1st Hungarian Army) |

== Sources ==
=== Documents ===
- Army Group A (25 October 1939 – 20 February 1940). "Kriegstagebuch Heeresgruppe A (Westen)" [War Diary Army Group A (West)]. German Federal Archive (in German).
- Army Group A (21 February – 31 May 1940). "Kriegstagebuch Heeresgruppe A (Westen)" [War Diary Army Group A (West)]. German Federal Archive (in German).
- Army Group A (1–24 June 1940). "Kriegstagebuch Heeresgruppe A (Westen)" [War Diary Army Group A (West)]. German Federal Archive (in German).
- Army Group A (25 June – 17 October 1940). "Kriegstagebuch Heeresgruppe A (Westen)" [War Diary Army Group A (West)]. German Federal Archive (in German).
- Army Group A (18 October – 31 December 1940). "Kriegstagebuch Heeresgruppe A (Westen)" [War Diary Army Group A (West)]. German Federal Archive (in German).
- Army Group A (1 January – 14 April 1941). "Kriegstagebuch Heeresgruppe A (Westen)" [War Diary Army Group A (West)]. German Federal Archive (in German).
- Army Group South (1939–1940). "Heeresgruppe A – Anlagen zum Kriegstagebuch: Kriegsgliederungen der Heeresgruppe A – Änderungen" [Army Group A – Attachments to the War Diary: Orders of Battle of Army Group A – Changes]. German Federal Archive (in German).
- Army Group South (2 February – 21 June 1941). "Kriegstagebuch Nr. 1 Heeresgruppe Süd (Vorbereitung Barbarossa)" [War Diary No. 1 Army Group South (Preparation Barbarossa)]. German Federal Archive (in German).
- Burenin, Ivan N.; Potalin (1944). "Журнал боевых действий войск 3 УкрФ, Период с 01.01.1944 по 31.01.1944 г." [Combat Journal of the 3rd Ukrainian Front, 1–31 January 1944]. Pamyat Naroda (in Russian). Russian Ministry of Defense.
- Tarasov; Levshuk (1944a). "Журнал боевых действий войск 4 УкрФ, Период с 01.01.1944 по 31.01.1944 г." [Combat Journal of the 4th Ukrainian Front, 1–31 January 1944]. Pamyat Naroda (in Russian). Russian Ministry of Defense.
- Tarasov; Levshuk (1944b). "Журнал боевых действий войск 4 УкрФ, Период с 01.02.1944 по 29.02.1944 г." [Combat Journal of the 4th Ukrainian Front, 1–29 February 1944]. Pamyat Naroda (in Russian). Russian Ministry of Defense.

=== Literature ===
- Schönherr, Klaus (2007). "The Withdrawal of Army Group A through the Crimea to Romania". In Frieser, Karl-Heinz (ed.). Eastern Front 1943–1944: The War in the East and on the Neighbouring Fronts. Germany and the Second World War. Vol. 8. Translated by Smerin, Barry. London: Clarendon Press. pp. 446–486.
