= Paul Ludwig Ewald von Kleist =

German field marshal (1881–1954)

Ewald von Kleist
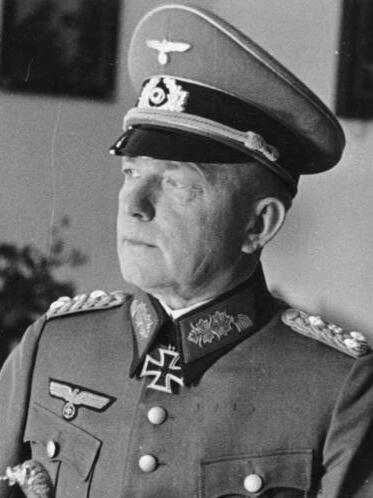
- Kleist in 1940
- Born: Paul Ludwig Ewald von Kleist; 8 August 1881; Braunfels, Germany
- Died: 13 November 1954 (aged 73); Vladimir Prison, Soviet Union
- Relatives: Ewald von Kleist-Schmenzin (cousin)
- Military career
- Allegiance: Germany
- Branch: Imperial German Army; Reichswehr; German Army
- Service years: 1900–1944
- Rank: Generalfeldmarschall
- Commands: XXII Motorised Corps; Panzer Group Kleist; 1st Panzer Army; Army Group A
- Conflicts: World War I; Eastern Front; Battle of Tannenberg; Estonian War of Independence; World War II; Invasion of Poland; Battle of France; Invasion of Yugoslavia; Eastern Front; Operation Barbarossa; Battle of Brody; Battle of Uman; Battle of Kiev; Battle of the Sea of Azov; Battle of Rostov; Second Battle of Kharkov; Case Blue; Dnieper Campaign
- Awards: Knight's Cross of the Iron Cross with Oak Leaves and Swords
- Criminal information
- Conviction: War crimes
- Penalty: 15 years (Yugoslavia); 25 years (Soviet Union)

Paul Ludwig Ewald von Kleist (8 August 1881 – 13 November 1954) was a German Generalfeldmarschall (Field Marshal) of the Wehrmacht during World War II. Born into the Prussian noble family von Kleist, Kleist entered the Prussian Army in 1900 and commanded a cavalry squadron during World War I. Kleist joined the Reichswehr of inter-war Germany before being discharged in 1938.

Recalled to active duty at the beginning of World War II, Kleist commanded a motorised corps in the Invasion of Poland. He then became the commander of Panzer Group Kleist (later 1st Panzer Army), the first operational formation of several Panzer corps in the Wehrmacht during the Battle of France, the Battle of Belgium, the Invasion of Yugoslavia and Operation Barbarossa, the invasion of the Soviet Union.

During the Battle of France, units under Kleist's command included Heinz Guderian's armoured corps and spearheaded the "blitzkrieg" attack through the Ardennes forest, outflanking the Maginot Line. His panzer divisions eventually pushed deep into France, resulting in Allied defeat. He then commanded the 1st Panzer Group as it drove deep into Ukraine and the Caucasus during Operation Barbarossa.

Kleist was appointed commander-in-chief of Army Group A during the last days of Case Blue, the 1942 German summer offensive in southern Russia. His disagreements with Hitler over strategic decisions led to his dismissal in March 1944 after the German defeat in right-bank Ukraine.

Following the war, Kleist was extradited to the Soviet Union where he was sentenced to 25 years in prison for war crimes; he died in prison.

== Early military career ==
Paul Ludwig Ewald von Kleist was born in Braunfels into the House of Kleist, an old Pomeranian noble family with a long history of military service. There had been two previous Prussian field marshals, numerous generals and Pour le Mérite recipients in the family. He was the son of Geheimer Studienrat Christof Hugo Albrecht August von Kleist (1848-1886), a high-ranking civil servant, and his wife, Elisabeth Gley (b. 1856).

At the age of 18, Kleist joined the Prussian field artillery regiment, "General Feldzeugmeister" No. 3 on 9 March 1900 as a fahnenjunker. He was commissioned as a leutnant on 18 August 1901. He became a battalion adjutant in 1904 and regimental adjutant in 1907. After attending the cavalry school at Hanover from 1908 to 1909, he was promoted to oberleutnant in 1910 and was sent to the prestigious War Academy in Berlin, to undergo general staff training. On 22 March 1914 he was promoted to captain and joined the 1st Life Hussars Regiment (Leib-Husaren-Regiment No. 1).

During the First World War, Kleist served on the Eastern Front and commanded a cavalry squadron at the Battle of Tannenberg. From 1915 to 1918 he served as a staff officer of the Guards Cavalry Division on the Western Front.

== Inter-war period ==
After the First World War ended, Kleist joined the Freikorps and participated in the Latvian and Estonian Wars of Independence as a member of the Iron Division. In June 1919, he led an attack group during the Battle of Cēsis.

Kleist joined the Reichswehr in 1920. From 1924 to 1928, he was assigned as a tactics instructor at the Hannover Cavalry School. In 1928, he served as the chief of staff of the 2nd Cavalry Division in Breslau, then from 1929 to 1931, he held the same position in the 3rd Division in Berlin. Kleist was promoted to Colonel in 1931 and was given command of the 9th (Prussian) Infantry Regiment in Potsdam. At the beginning of 1932, he was given command of the 2nd Cavalry Division. In October 1932, he was promoted to Major General.

Kleist was a monarchist, and did not heavily involve himself in the politics of the Weimar Republic. He openly favored the restoration of the House of Hohenzollern. After the Nazis seized power, the Reichswehr was united with the newly formed Wehrmacht. On 1 December 1933, he was promoted to lieutenant general. In October 1934, he was given command of the "Breslau Army", which was later reorganized into the VIII. Army Corps. In 1935, he was given command of the newly formed military district VIII responsible for Silesia while simultaneously serving as the commanding general of the VIII. Army Corps. On 1 August 1936, he was promoted to General of the Cavalry.

Kleist was a member of the Order of Saint John, an ancient Protestant religious order. In 1935, Prince Oskar of Prussia, the Order's Grand Master, made him a Knight of Justice of the Order.

After the war, Kleist claimed that being forced to listen to the proclamation of the antisemitic Nuremberg Laws was a "great humiliation" of his life. On February 5, 1938, during the Blomberg–Fritsch affair when Hitler purged the army of staff who were unsympathetic to the Nazi regime, Kleist was forced to retire from service for his monarchist attitudes. Despite his forced retirement, Kleist received a significant departing honor when he was authorized to wear the uniform of the 8th Cavalry Regiment. According to Kleist, he withdrew from the army because he spoke out too loudly in favor of Christianity and the church, which clashed with Nazi ideology. To secure his retirement, he acquired a property near Breslau.

== World War II ==
At the outbreak of the Second World War, Kleist was recalled to active duty and led the XXII Motorised Corps in the Invasion of Poland. Kurt Zeitzler, the future chief of the Army General Staff, served as his chief of staff. His corps broke through the southern wing of the Polish army. According to Kleist, during the campaign, he successfully utilized cavalry tactics with his motorized units. Kleist's units also encountered friendly Soviet units invading Poland from the east; his first impression of them was positive. He particularly noted their surprising extent of motorization, good behavior and advanced military technique.

=== Invasion of France ===
In May 1940, Panzer Group Kleist was formed, the first operational formation of several Panzer corps in the Wehrmacht. Zeitzler continued to serve as Kleist's Chief of Staff. Panzer Group Kleist, consisting of XIV Corps under Wietersheim, XLI Panzer Corps under Reinhardt, and XIX Panzer Corps under Heinz Guderian, played a pivotal role in the Invasion of Belgium, France and the Low Countries. On 10 May, it spearheaded the German breakthrough in the Ardennes. As it advanced through southern Belgium, Kleist and Guderian clashed over where the main point of effort should fall. Kleist, Guderian's immediate superior, pressed for the main point to come at Flize, further west than Sedan. Kleist argued that the blow would avoid a double river crossing at the Meuse (at Sedan) and Ardennes canal (to the west of Sedan). Moreover, the blow would strike at the dividing line between the French Ninth Army and the French Second Army. Guderian saw things differently, and pointed out that a thrust along the lines of Kleist's plan would put the flank of the advance within range of the fortress artillery at Charleville-Mézières, some 25 kilometres (16 mi) northwest of Sedan. The shift of operations further north would also disperse concentration (or Schwerpunkt) and disrupt the intense planning of the German tactical units, who had been in training for the Sedan attack and an advance north-west, for months. He also felt that a regrouping period in front of Sedan would delay the assault for 24 hours and allow the French to bring up reinforcements. Kleist agreed that such a delay was unacceptable, so he agreed to Guderian's plan. Panzer Group Kleist overwhelmed the French defenses at Sedan, advanced west and reached the sea, forming a huge pocket containing several Belgian, British, and French armies. Kleist said of his role in the French campaign after the war:

Without being unduly modest I can assert that I was the most active army commander in France and that I shortened the French campaign by many months by my panzer actions.

=== Invasion of Yugoslavia ===
Kleist was promoted to Generaloberst on 19 July 1940 and received the Knight's Cross of the Iron Cross. In April 1941, Panzer Group Kleist was renamed to 1st Panzer Group, and spearheaded the invasion of Yugoslavia. Deployed against central Yugoslavia (Serbia), units of the 1st Panzer Group were the first to enter Belgrade.

=== Invasion of the Soviet Union ===
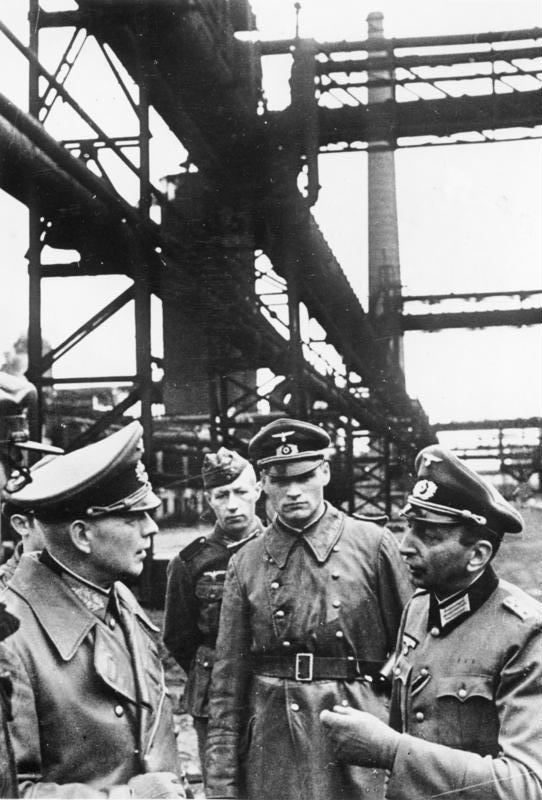
Kleist (left) inspects a large iron and steel works in Ukraine recently taken over by his troops, 1941

In June 1941, with the launching of Operation Barbarossa, Kleist led the 1st Panzer Group as part of Army Group South – tasked with the capture of Moldavia and Ukraine – and saw success in the initial phase of the invasion, advancing deep into Ukraine. The 1st Panzer Group broke through the Stalin Line, then defeated the five mechanized corps of the Soviet 5th Army and 6th Army in the Battle of Brody (23 to 30 June 1941). In July 1941, during the Battle of Uman, the 1st Panzer Group broke through the Soviet Southern Front's lines, leading to the encirclement and annihilation of the Soviet 6th and 12th armies to the southeast of Uman city (in present-day Cherkasy Oblast). During the First Battle of Kiev of August–September 1941, 1st Panzer Group's northward turn from central Ukraine in conjunction with 2nd Panzer Group's southward advance from Smolensk led to the encirclement and destruction of the entire Soviet Southwestern Front east of Kiev, inflicting over 600,000 losses on the Red Army. However, the campaign had been costly, leaving the German forces with just half the tanks they had had three months earlier.

Kleist was very favorably impressed by the Red Army. He remarked after the war: "The men were first-rate fighters from the start, and we owed our success simply to superior training. They became first-rate soldiers with experience. They fought most toughly, had amazing endurance, and could carry on without most of the things other armies regarded as necessities. The Staff were quick to learn from their early defeats, and soon became highly efficient." On Soviet technical innovation and arms, he noted: "Their equipment was very good even in 1941, especially the tanks. Their artillery was excellent, and also most of the infantry weapons – their rifles (SVT-40) were more modern than ours, and had a more rapid rate of fire. Their T-34 was the finest in the world."

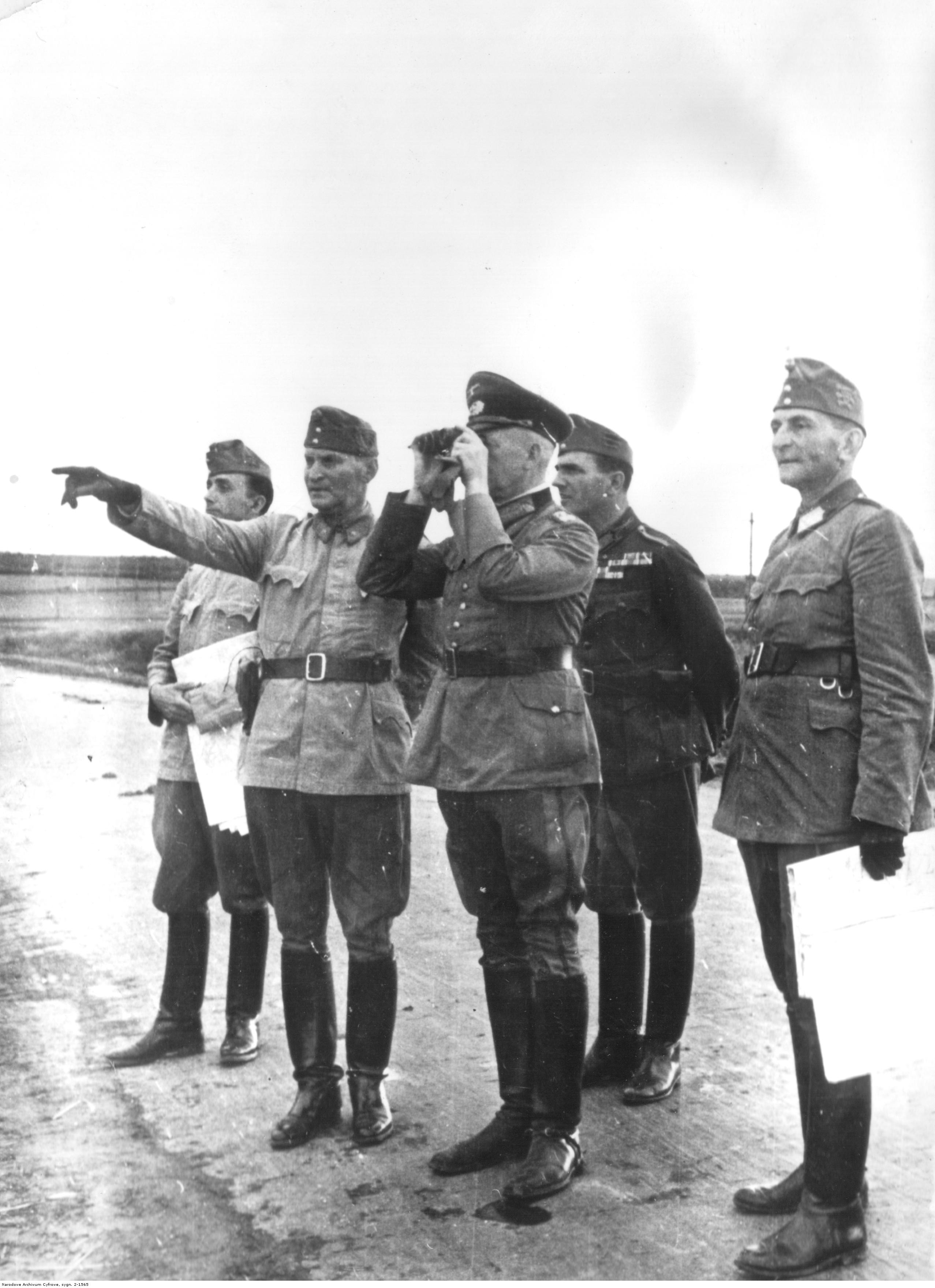
Hungarian general Béla Miklós (2nd from left) and Kleist (with binoculars) at the Dnieper river, September 1941

After operations at Kiev concluded, Kleist's 1st Panzer Army advanced east to capture the important industrial Donbas region. On 26 September 1941, the Battle of the Sea of Azov began as the Southern Front launched an attack on the northern shores of the Sea of Azov against the German 11th Army advancing into the Crimea. On 1 October, the 1st Panzer Army swept south and encircled the two attacking Soviet 9th and 18th armies at Melitopol (Zaporizhzhia Oblast); by 11 October, both Soviet armies had been destroyed and the 1st Panzer Army had taken the Donbas. The 1st Panzer Army then attacked east along the shore of the Sea of Azov toward Rostov near the mouth of the Don river, the last barrier before the Caucasus.

On 17 November 1941, the German forces forced their way across the Mius River and launched an offensive against the Southern Front at Rostov. On 19 November 1941, the 1st Panzer Army reached Rostov and the following day, they seized bridges over the river Don. Three days after reaching Rostov, the 1st Panzer Army had captured the city. However, on 27 November, the Southern Front, as part of the Rostov Strategic Offensive Operation, counter-attacked the 1st Panzer Army's over-extended spearhead from the north, forcing them to pull out of Rostov. By 2 December 1941, the Soviet forces had retaken Rostov and forced the 1st Panzer Army to withdraw back to the Mius River, near Taganrog. This marked the first major German withdrawal of the war. On 18 February 1942, Kleist was awarded the Oak Leaves to his Knight's Cross.

In 1942, Kleist was given an estate worth 567,000 Reichsmarks by the Nazi regime. A Silesian estate already owned by Kleist was extended by 100-hectares; this particular extension concerned a confiscated Jewish-owned tract that was being divided up. This was a part of Hitler's policy of buying the loyalty of his senior commanders.

==== Operation Fredericus ====
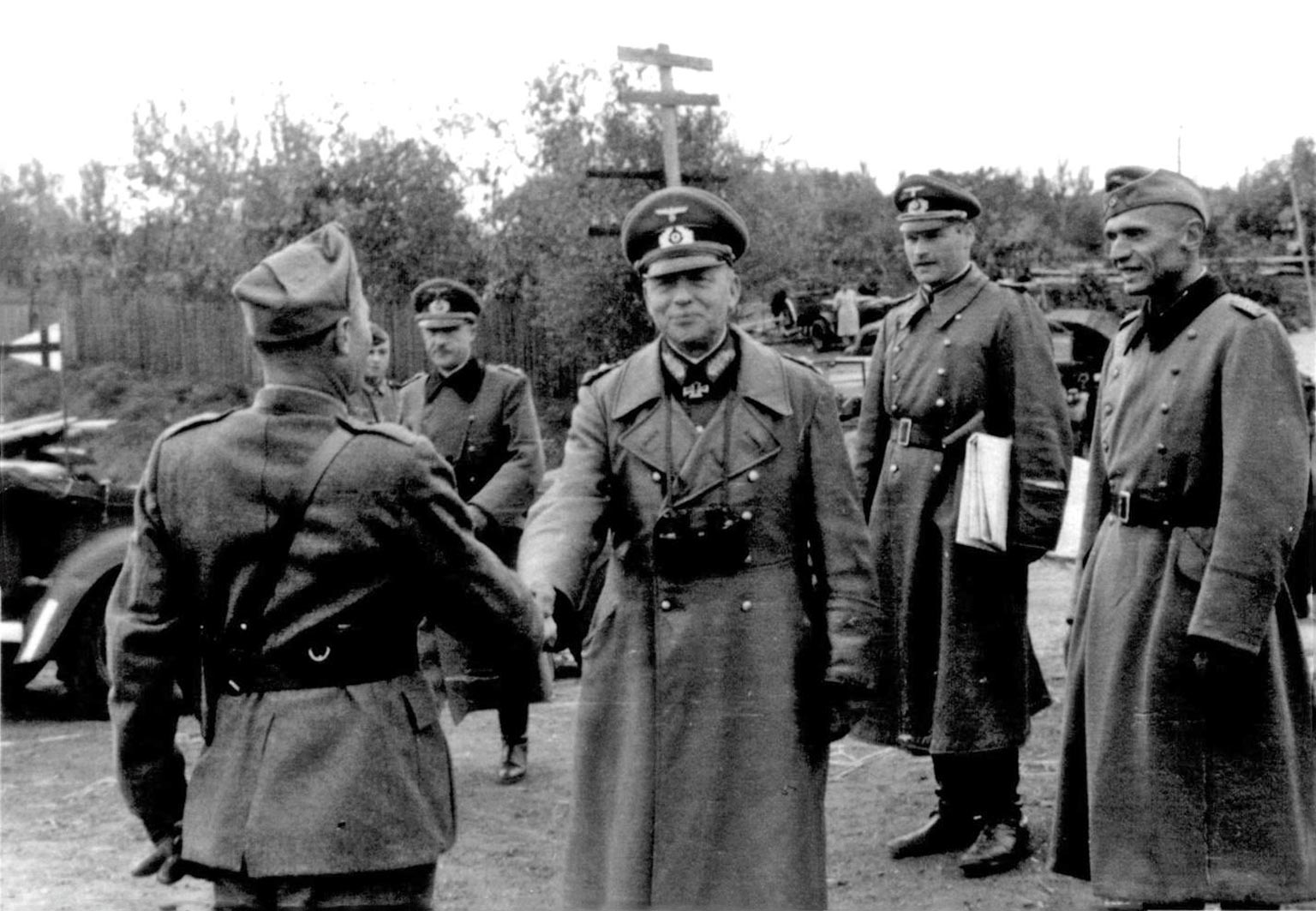
Kleist greeting an Italian officer near Dnepropetrovsk, 1941

During the Second Battle of Kharkov on 17 May 1942 as part of Operation Fredericus, Kleist's 1st Panzer Army attacked the Barvenkovo bridgehead from the south, advancing up to ten kilometres in the first day of the attack. On 19 May, the German 6th Army led by General Friedrich Paulus launched an offensive north of the bridgehead, encircling the Soviet 6th Army and 57th Army. After six days of encirclement, both armies were destroyed. By 28 May Kleist and Paulus' armies had captured 240,000 prisoners and destroyed or captured over 1250 Soviet tanks and 2000 artillery pieces.

==== Caucasus offensive and withdrawal ====
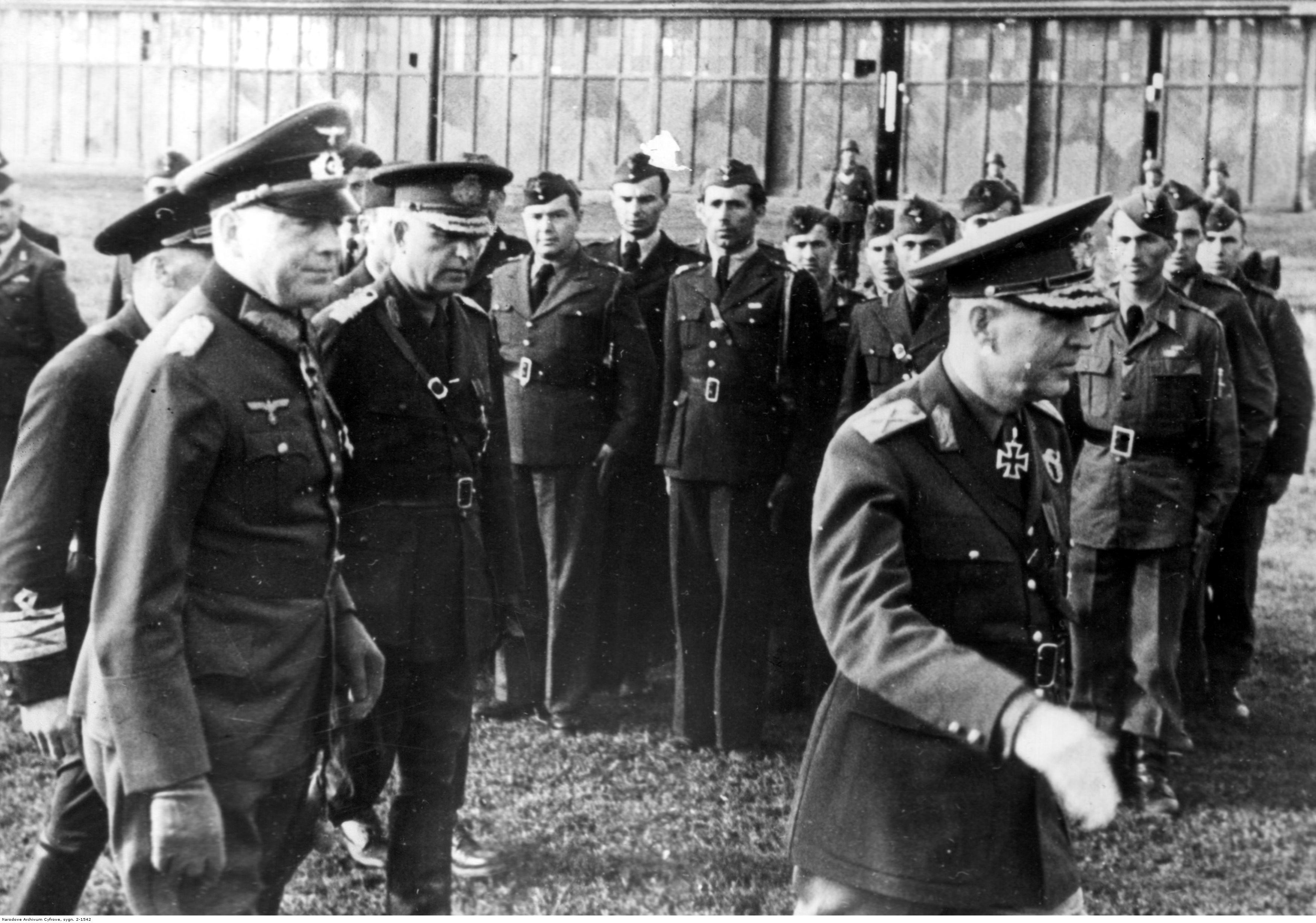
Ion Antonescu (right) of Romania with Kleist during a visit to the front, June 1942

The summer of 1942 saw Army Group South subdivided into Army Group A and B. Army Group A, which included Kleist's 1st Panzer Army, had the task of leading the Axis thrust into the Caucasus in the execution of Case Blue, the German offensive which aimed to capture the important oilfields of Grozny and Baku. The 1st Panzer Army was to spearhead the attack. Army Group A advanced deep into Southern Russia, capturing Rostov-on-Don, the oil city of Maykop, Krasnodar and the Kuban region. However, heavy Soviet resistance and the long distances from Axis sources of supply eventually reduced the Axis offensive to local advances only, and prevented Army Group A from capturing their ultimate objectives.

On 22 November 1942, Kleist replaced Field Marshal Wilhelm List as commander of Army Group A near the end of Case Blue. Hitler ordered him to hold position and to resume the offensive should the Axis forces take Stalingrad. This possibility ended after the Soviets launched counter-offensives Operation Uranus (November 1942), which encircled the German 6th Army in Stalingrad, and Operation Little Saturn (December 1942 to February 1943). Little Saturn aimed to cut off Army Group A in the Caucasus, however, the limited scope of the Soviet offensive gave Kleist enough time to withdraw his Army Group A in the direction of the Kuban, abandoning the Caucasus. Kleist later said after the war:

The capture of Stalingrad was subsidiary to the main aim. It was only of importance as a convenient place, in the bottleneck between Don and the Volga, where we could block an attack on our flank by Russian forces coming from the east. At the start, Stalingrad was no more than a name on the map to us.

Kleist also said that he tried to persuade Hitler against using Romanian, Hungarian and Italian troops to cover the advancing German armies' long exposed flank. However, Hitler did not listen. Hitler told Kleist that these troops "would only be used to hold the flank along the Don river from Voronezh to its southerly bend, and beyond Stalingrad to the Caspian," which, according to Hitler, were the "easiest sectors to hold."

==== Battle of the Dnieper and dismissal ====
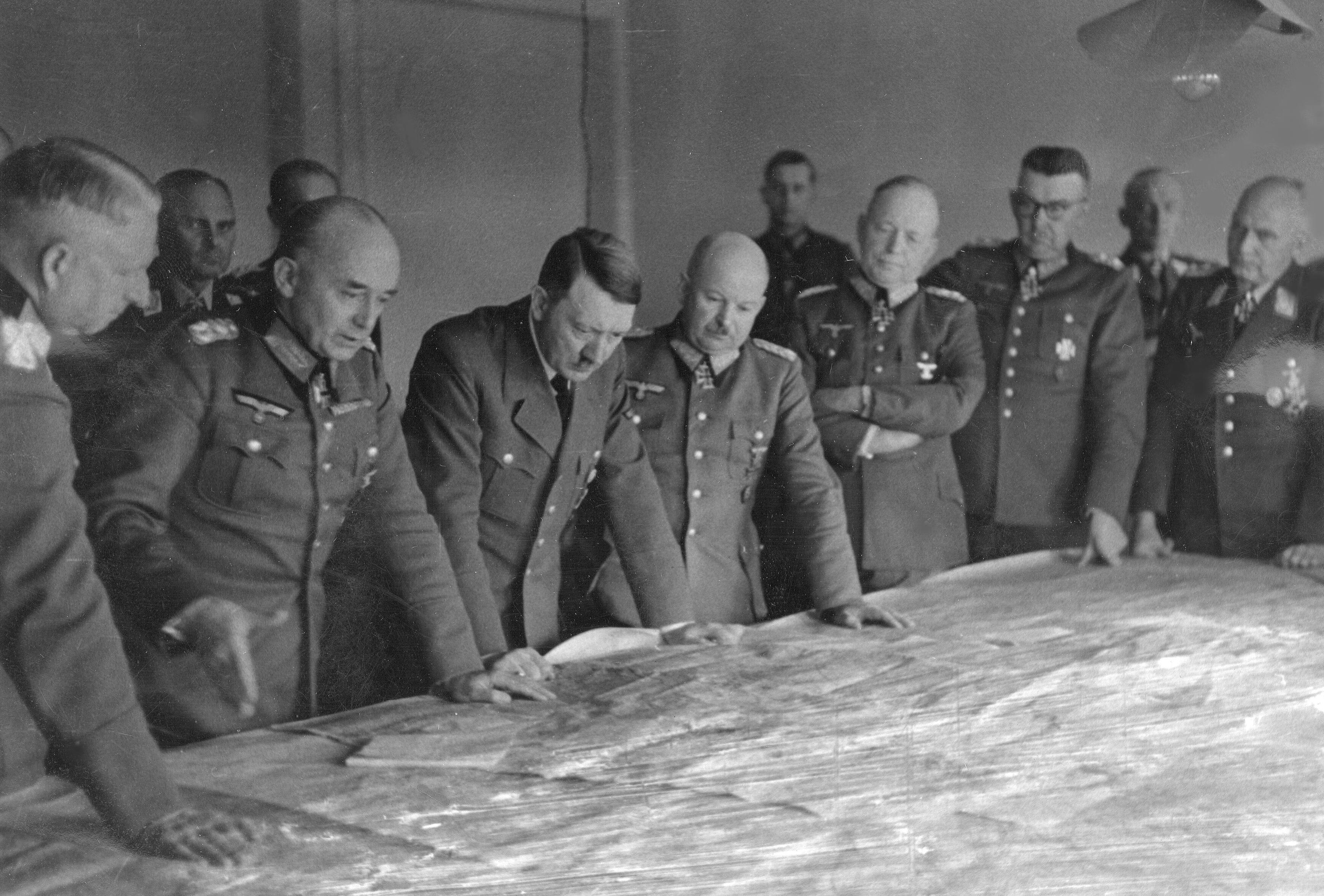
Hitler at a staff conference with Field Marshals Kleist, Manstein (far left) and army Chief of Staff Kurt Zeitzler, March 1943

On 1 February 1943, Kleist was promoted to Field Marshal. In July 1943, the Red Army launched a massive offensive along the Dnieper river. By October 1943, the 17th Army, a part of Army Group A, was forced to retreat from the Kuban bridgehead across the Kerch Strait to Crimea. Erwin Jaenecke, commander of the 17th Army, declared that he refused to take the responsibility for another Stalingrad, and proposed to execute a command to evacuate, which Army Group A had issued on the 26th and Hitler had canceled. Kleist countered with an order to hold the Crimea no matter how the battle went. Kleist, who personally opposed Hitler on the question of holding the Crimea, called Jaenecke on the 28th and said to him: "As a soldier I have often had to struggle with myself in similar situations. You will not save a single man. What is to come will come one way or another. This attitude only undermines the confidence of the troops..."

In November 1943, the Soviets eventually cut off the land-based connection of 17th Army through the Perekop Isthmus. By December 1943, the Soviets had conquered the west bank of the Dnieper, and Kleist's Army Group A was forced to retreat to southwest Ukraine. In December 1943, the Soviets launched the Dnieper-Carpathian Offensive against Erich von Manstein's re-constituted Army Group South, intending to capture all of the Ukrainian and Moldavian territories under the Axis forces. As part of the initial phase of the offensive, the Soviet 3rd Ukrainian Front to the south launched the Nikopol–Krivoi Rog Offensive against Kleist's Army Group A. Proceeding slowly at first, the front eventually destroyed the salient projecting around Kryvyi Rih and Nikopol, costing the Germans the important mining operations there as well as nearly encircling the reformed German 6th Army. On 11 March, Kleist declared that Army Group A would retreat into Bessarabia "in spite of the Führer and in spite of Antonescu." By the end of March 1944, the German Dnieper line was broken and the Soviets had recovered most of right-bank Ukraine. This defeat, along with other Soviet offensive, resulted in heavy German casualties. German losses, while less than Soviet losses, were much more difficult to sustain, as there were no further reserves of men and materiel to draw on. Kleist had disagreed with Hitler over the withdrawal of Army Group A during the offensive. He had demanded permission to pull back his forces to more defensible positions, however, Hitler ordered his armies to stand where they were. Hitler blamed his generals for the overall strategic success of Soviet armies, and on 30 March 1944, Kleist was dismissed and replaced by Ferdinand Schörner.

After the 20 July plot to assassinate Hitler failed (1944), the Gestapo implicated and arrested Kleist due to the involvement of his cousin Ewald von Kleist-Schmenzin in the Oster conspiracy. Kleist avoided trial and was later released.

=== Treatment of civilians ===
Historian Samuel W. Mitcham writes that Kleist had tried to "win over" the local population of the Caucasus and Ukraine. In September 1942, Kleist remarked: "these vast spaces depress me. And these vast hordes of people! We're lost if we don't win them over." He appointed two former military attachés to Moscow to his staff, Ernst August Köstring and Oskar von Niedermayer, who advised Kleist on the treatment of non-Russian ethnic minorities. Neidermeyer had also been a professor of geopolitics at the University of Berlin. Partly as a result of Kleist's policies, around 800,000 Soviet citizens were recruited as collaborators in the fight against the Soviet Union. These men included minorities such as Azerbaijanis, Uzbeks, Georgians, and Cossacks, many of whom would serve in Ostlegionen and Russian Liberation Army units. Kleist employed these recruits in Cossack cavalry regiments under his command, which would lead to the creation of the 1st Cossack Cavalry Division. He also commanded the 162nd Infantry Division, which drew from Ostlegion recruits.

According to Mitcham and Boris Khavkin, a professor of history at the Russian State University for the Humanities, Kleist's more "humane" policies led to clashes with Fritz Sauckel, General Plenipotentiary for Labour Deployment (head of slave labor importation for Nazi Germany), and Erich Koch, Reichskommissar of Ukraine. Mitcham writes that Kleist once ordered subordinates to make sure that 'voluntary' labor recruitment programs in his area were actually voluntary, which enraged Sauckel and Koch. Kleist also once summoned SS, Gestapo and 'Police' officials to his headquarters and told them that he would not allow "excesses" in his zone of command.

According to Khavkin, on December 6, 1942, Kleist abolished the mandatory wearing of the Star of David in the Nalchik Ghetto. When he was told to destroy the Mountain Jews, Kleist asked for a reexamination of them by the Office of Racial Policy. Under Kleist's supervision, the Mountain Jews of Nalchik established a council which succeeded in convincing the Germans that they were not Jewish, but part of the indigenous population of the Caucasus. As a result of this, the Nazis focused on the killing of Ashkenazi Jews in Nalchik, between 600 and 1,000 of whom were murdered between November and December 1942 in his area of command. The majority of the Mountain Jews however, survived when Nalchik was liberated by Soviet troops on January 4, 1943. Between 1941 and 1944, thousands of Jews were massacred in Bessarabia, mostly by Romanian forces. Although in early 1944, Bessarabia and its capital Kishinev (Chișinău) was an area occupied by some units under his command, he claimed that he thought the Romanian forces had committed such massacres alone.

After his capture by the Americans, Kleist admitted to psychologist Leon Goldensohn that in the winter of 1941 to 1942 he was aware of rumors that Jews were being deported in order to be assembled somewhere, he was also aware of antisemitic actions such as the Lviv pogroms. However, according to him, he did not believe rumors of atrocities committed by German forces on the Eastern Front, as he was reassured that they were just rumors or that "non-Germans had done these beastly things". He claimed that in January 1943, after he heard that Jews were to be murdered in his territory, he called for SS police chief Gerret Korsemann and told him that he "would not tolerate any actions against the Jews", and that Korsemann subsequently denied he had any orders to do so. He further claimed that he had only heard of the atrocities committed in Auschwitz after the war, although he was aware of the Oranienburg and Dachau concentration camps, where some of his friends and relatives were interned for political reasons.

After his forced retirement, Kleist was in contact with generals of the German resistance, although there is no direct evidence of his participation in the conspiracy against Hitler. Khavkin opines that Kleist was not a Nazi, but a servant of a criminal regime and became involved in war crimes as a result.

== Trial and death ==
Kleist was arrested in late April 1945 in Mitterfels by the American 26th Infantry Division, and handed over to the British Army. Kleist testified in the Nuremberg trials. In September 1946, he was extradited to Yugoslavia, where he was tried and sentenced to 15 years in prison for war crimes. He also testified in Yugoslavia that Operation Retribution, the 1941 bombing of Belgrade, "had a primarily political-terrorist character and had nothing to do with the war. That air bombing was a matter of Hitler's vanity, and his personal revenge." Kleist was the highest ranking Wehrmacht commander to stand trial in Yugoslavia; the second-highest ranking commander was Generaloberst Alexander Löhr, who commanded German forces in Southeastern Europe and Operation Retribution. In 1947, Löhr was sentenced to death and executed for war crimes along with several other more junior Wehrmacht officers in Belgrade. The historian Khavkin opines that Kleist's trial and the evidence brought against him were partly political and that, although the Germans committed terrible war crimes in Yugoslavia, his personal guilt could not be proven.

In 1949, he was extradited to the Soviet Union, where he was charged with war crimes. Kleist was one of the three German field marshals captured by Soviet forces, the other two being Ferdinand Schörner and Friedrich Paulus. The Soviet prosecutors presented evidence that Kleist carried out and issued criminal orders. The verdict stated that in the Krasnodar territory alone, German forces, including units under the command of Kleist, killed more than 61,000 Soviet citizens, destroyed more than 63,000 industrial and economic buildings, looted from collective farms, stole hundreds of thousands of livestock, burned dozens of villages and destroyed many schools, hospitals and children's institutions. Kleist was sentenced to 25 years in a correctional labour camp.

In 1952, the Military Collegium of the Supreme Court recognized Kleist as a particularly dangerous criminal and demanded strict isolation of him from society. Kleist's verdict was changed from a correctional labour camp term, to a prison term, and he was then sent to Vladimir Central Prison.

On 13 November 1954, Kleist died of heart failure in Vladimir Central Prison. He was the most senior-ranking soldier among the German prisoners of war in the Soviet Union to die in Russian captivity. Kleist was buried at the Prince Vladimir cemetery near the prison walls.

In October 1955, after German Chancellor Konrad Adenauer's visit to Moscow, the Soviet Union repatriated the remaining 14,000 German prisoners of war convicted of war crimes. Kleist's body was exhumed, dressed in a field marshal's uniform and sent home to Germany. Kleist had two sons, Johannes Jürgen Christoph Ewald and Hugo Edmund Christoph Heinrich.

== Awards ==
- Iron Cross (1914) 2nd Class (4 October 1914) & 1st Class (27 January 1915)
- Clasp to the Iron Cross (1939) & 2nd Class (17 September 1939) & 1st Class (27 September 1939)
- Hanseatic Cross (Hamburg)
- Knight's Cross of the Iron Cross with Oak Leaves and Swords
  - Knight's Cross on 15 May 1940 as General der Kavallerie and commanding general of XXII. Armeekorps (Panzergruppe "von Kleist")
  - Oak Leaves on 17 February 1942 as Generaloberst and Commander-in-chief of Panzergruppe 1
  - Swords on 30 March 1944 as Generalfeldmarschall and Commander-in-chief Heeresgruppe A
