= XXII Army Corps (Wehrmacht) =

XXII Army Corps Panzer Group Kleist
- German: XXII. Armeekorps; Panzergruppe Kleist
- Active: 26 August 1939 – 16 November 1940
- Country: Nazi Germany
- Branch: Heer ( Wehrmacht)
- Size: Corps; Field army (as panzer group)
- Engagements: Battle of Poland; Battle of France

Commanders
- Commander: Ewald von Kleist

The XXII (Motorized) Army Corps (German: XXII. Armeekorps (mot.)) was a German army corps during World War II.

== History ==
The XXII (Motorized) Army Corps was created on 26 August 1939 in Wehrkreis X. The Corps participated the next month in the Invasion of Poland, during which it broke through the southern wing of the Polish Army.

In May 1940, the High Command of the XXII Corps also received command over the XIV (von Wietersheim), XXXXI (Reinhardt) and XIX Army Corps (Guderian), and renamed as Panzer Group Kleist (Panzergruppe Kleist), was engaged in the Battle of France under command of Ewald von Kleist. It played a crucial role in the German victory, when it overwhelmed the French defenses at Sedan, and advanced west reaching the sea at Abbeville. In June 1940, during Fall Rot, the second phase in the Battle of France, Panzergruppe von Kleist was in control of the XIV (von Wietersheim) and XVI Panzer Corps (Hoepner), and advanced as far as the Spanish border.

In July 1940, the Corps was again reverted from a Panzer Group to the XXII Army Corps.

On 16 November 1940 the XXII Corps was converted into Panzergruppe 1, still under command of Von Kleist.

== Commanders ==
- Generaloberst Ewald von Kleist
- Chief of Staff : Colonel Kurt Zeitzler

== Area of operations ==
- Poland - September 1939 to October 1939
- France - June 1940 to July 1940

== Sources ==
- XXII. Armeekorps on Lexikon-der-wehrmacht.de
