= Helmuth Schlömer =

German Wehrmacht general (1893–1995)

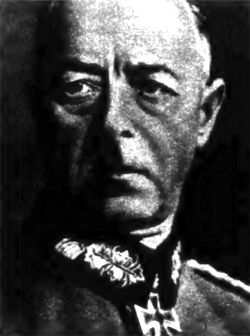
- Born: 20 May 1893; Hausberge (district Minden)
- Died: 18 August 1995 (aged 102); Minden
- Military career
- Allegiance: German Empire; Weimar Republic; Nazi Germany
- Branch: Army
- Service years: 1913–1945
- Rank: Generalleutnant
- Commands: 3rd Infantry Division; XIV Panzer Corps
- Conflicts: World War I; World War II; Invasion of Poland; Battle of Brest-Litovsk; Western Front; Battle of France; Battle of Dunkirk; Eastern Front; Operation Barbarossa; Battle of Białystok–Minsk; Battle of Smolensk (1941); Battle of Moscow; Battle of the Caucasus; Battle of Stalingrad (POW)
- Awards: Knight's Cross of the Iron Cross with Oak Leaves
- Other work: NKFD

Helmuth Schlömer (20 May 1893 – 18 August 1995) was a German general in the Wehrmacht during World War II and commanded the XIV Panzer Corps in the Battle of Stalingrad in 1943.

Schlömer joined the army in March 1913 and was an officer in World War I. After the War, he remained in the armed forces, then renamed to Reichswehr. When the Reichswehr was turned into the Wehrmacht, he became a teacher at the military school (Kriegsschule) in Munich. In World War II he took part in the Invasion of Poland, the Battle of France and the Siege of Leningrad. In 1942 he was promoted to Generalmajor and in January 1943 to Lieutenant general. At that time he fought in the Battle of Stalingrad as commander of the XIV Panzer Corps.

On 29 Jan 1943 Friedrich Paulus learned "Lieutenant-General Schlömer and other generals had received Red Army envoys and were negotiating a surrender with them." While in Soviet captivity he joined the National Committee for a Free Germany (Nationalkomitee Freies Deutschland, NKFD) and was released in 1949.

== Awards and decorations ==
- Clasp to the Iron Cross (1939) 2nd Class (14 September 1939) & 1st Class (31 October 1939)
- Knight's Cross of the Iron Cross with Oak Leaves
  - Knight's Cross on 2 October 1941 as Oberst and commander of Schützen-Regiment 5
  - 161st Oak Leaves on 23 December 1942 as Generalmajor and commander of 3. Infanterie-Division (mot.)

Military offices
| Preceded by Generalleutnant Curt Jahn | Commander of 3. Infanterie-Division (mot.); 1 April 1942 – 17 January 1943 | Succeeded by Oberst Jobst Freiherr von Hanstein |
| Preceded by Generaloberst Hans-Valentin Hube | Commander of XIV Panzer Corps; 17 January 1943 – 2 February 1943 | Succeeded by Generaloberst Hans-Valentin Hube |
