= Kurt Zeitzler =

Nazi Chief of the Army General Staff (1942–1944)

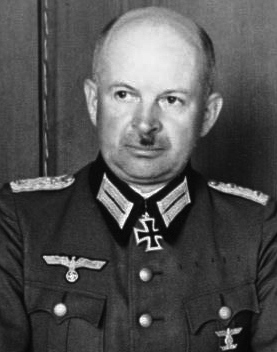
- Zeitzler in 1941

Chief of the General Staff of the German Army High Command
- In office 24 September 1942 – 10 June 1944
- Leader: Adolf Hitler
- Preceded by: Franz Halder
- Succeeded by: Adolf Heusinger

Personal details
- Born: 9 June 1895 Goßmar, German Empire
- Died: 25 September 1963 (aged 68) Hohenaschau, West Germany
- Awards: Knight's Cross of the Iron Cross

Military service
- Allegiance: German Empire; Weimar Republic; Nazi Germany
- Branch/service: German Army
- Years of service: 1914–1945
- Rank: Generaloberst
- Battles/wars: World War I; World War II; Invasion of Poland; Battle of France; Balkan Campaign; Operation Uranus; Battle of Stalingrad

Kurt Zeitzler (German pronunciation: [ˈkʊʁt ˈtsaɪtslɐ]; 9 June 1895 – 25 September 1963) was a Chief of the Army General Staff in the Wehrmacht of Nazi Germany during World War II.

Zeitzler was almost exclusively a staff officer, serving as chief of staff in a corps, army, and army group. In September 1942, he was selected by Adolf Hitler as Chief of the Army General Staff, replacing Franz Halder. In early 1943 he was one of the key figures in the decision to launch Operation Citadel, the last major German attack on the Eastern Front, which ended in defeat. Zeitzler lost faith in Hitler's judgement, and abandoned his position in June 1944 after suffering a nervous breakdown. Zeitzler was regarded as an energetic and efficient staff officer, noted for his ability in managing the movement of large mobile formations.

== World War I and interwar period ==
Born in Goßmar in the Province of Brandenburg, Zeitzler came from a family of pastors. At the age of 18 he joined the 4th Thuringian Infantry Regiment of the German Army on 23 March 1914. Five months later Germany was at war. Zeitzler was promoted to lieutenant in December 1914, and commanded various units, including a pioneer detachment. At the end of the war he was a regimental adjutant.

Zeitzler was chosen as one of the 4,000 officers selected to serve in the Reichswehr, the small German army permitted under the limits of the Treaty of Versailles. He was promoted to captain in January 1928. In 1929 he began three years of service as a staff officer of the 3rd Division. In February 1934 he was transferred to the Reichswehrministerium ('defense ministry' of the Weimar Republic) and promoted to major. In 1937 he became a staff officer in the operations office for the Oberkommando des Heeres (OKH), the headquarters of the German Army. In April 1939 he took command of Infantry Regiment 60, and was promoted to full colonel in June.

== World War II ==
During the invasion of Poland in September 1939, Zeitzler was chief of staff to General Wilhelm List, commanding the XXII (Motorized) Corps in the 14th Army. In March 1940 he became chief of staff to General von Kleist, commanding Panzergruppe A, later redesignated 1st Panzer Army. During the Battle of France, Zeitzler brilliantly organized and managed the panzer drive through the Ardennes. He continued in this post through the successful invasion of Yugoslavia and Battle of Greece. On 18 May 1941 Zeitzler was awarded the Knight's Cross of the Iron Cross.

His greatest success came during Operation Barbarossa, the 1941 invasion of the Soviet Union. During the first two months of Barbarossa, 1st Panzer Army plunged east into Soviet territory, then moved south to the Black Sea to cut off Soviet forces in the Battle of Uman, then north to encircle Soviet forces around Kiev, then south again across the Dnieper River, and then further south to cut off Soviet forces near the Sea of Azov. Through all this strenuous campaigning, Zeitzler kept 1st Panzer Army moving smoothly and ensured that supplies arrived. In appreciation of Zeitzler, Kleist commented "The biggest problem in throwing about armies in this way was that of maintaining supplies."

In January 1942, Zeitzler was made chief of staff to General Gerd von Rundstedt, OB West ('Commander in Chief West') and commander of Army Group D. He played an important role in responding to the Canadian raid on Dieppe on 19 August 1942.

=== Chief of Staff, OKH ===
On 24 September 1942 Zeitzler was promoted to General der Infanterie ('General of the Infantry') and simultaneously was appointed Chief of the OKH General Staff, replacing Franz Halder. Hitler had been impressed by Zeitzler's optimistic and vigorous reports, and chose him over several higher-ranked and more senior officers. Albert Speer stated Hitler wanted a reliable assistant who "doesn't go off and brood on my orders, but energetically sees to carrying them out."

Following Zeitzler's promotion, Hitler was initially impressed with his dedication to his task and fighting spirit. In November 1942, Soviet counterattacks surrounded the German Sixth Army in Stalingrad. Zeitzler recommended that the Sixth Army immediately break out and withdraw from Stalingrad to the Don bend, where the broken front could be restored. Hitler became enraged, overruled Zeitzler, and personally ordered the Sixth Army to stand fast around Stalingrad, where it was eventually destroyed.

During early 1943, Zeitzler developed the initial plans for Operation Citadel, the final major German offensive in the east, and convinced Hitler to undertake the offensive despite the objections raised by several other senior officers. The offensive ended in a strategic defeat for the Germans, and a series of defensive battles ensued.

Zeitzler was promoted to the rank of colonel general in January 1944, but his relationship with Hitler deteriorated during that year. Hitler blamed him for the German defeat in the Crimea during April and May. This caused Zeitzler to signal his desire to resign. By the middle of the year, Zeitzler had lost all faith in Hitler's tactics as a result of the deteriorating situation in Western Europe after the Allied landing at Normandy and Hitler's refusal to allow Army Group Centre to withdraw to more defensible positions on the Eastern Front. On 1 July, Zeitzler suffered a nervous breakdown, and fled Hitler's Berghof residence. Hitler never spoke to him again, and had him dismissed from the Army in January 1945, refusing him the right to wear a uniform.

== Postwar life ==
At the end of the war, Zeitzler was captured by British troops and remained a prisoner of war until the end of February 1947. He appeared as a witness for the defense during the Nuremberg trials, and worked with the Operational History Section (German) of the Historical Division of the US Army.

Zeitzler died of lung cancer in 1963 in Hohenaschau of Upper Bavaria.

== Positions in World War II ==
1939	Commanding Officer 60th Regiment
1939–1940	Chief of Staff XXII Corps, Poland
1940–1941	Chief of Staff Panzer Group von Kleist, France
1941	Chief of Staff 1st Panzer Group, Yugoslavia and the Eastern Front
1941–1942	Chief of Staff 1st Panzer Army, Eastern Front
1942	Chief of Staff Army Group D, France
1942–1944	Chief of Staff of the OKH
1944–1945	In reserve

== Awards ==
- Knight's Cross of the Iron Cross on 18 May 1941 as Oberst i.G. and Chef des Generalstabes Panzer-Gruppe 1

== Sources ==
- Fellgiebel, Walther-Peer (2000) [1986]. Die Träger des Ritterkreuzes des Eisernen Kreuzes 1939–1945 — Die Inhaber der höchsten Auszeichnung des Zweiten Weltkrieges aller Wehrmachtteile [The Bearers of the Knight's Cross of the Iron Cross 1939–1945 — The Owners of the Highest Award of the Second World War of all Wehrmacht Branches] (in German). Friedberg, Germany: Podzun-Pallas. ISBN 978-3-7909-0284-6.
- Kershaw, Ian (2000). 1936–1945: Nemesis. Hitler. Vol. 2. London: Allen Lane. ISBN 978-0-7139-9229-8. OCLC 917323631. OL 21776763M. Wikidata Q138306768.
- Liddell Hart, B.H. (1948). The German Generals Talk. New York, NY: Morrow.
- Scherzer, Veit [in German] (2007). Ritterkreuzträger 1939–1945 [The Knight's Cross Bearers 1939–1945] (in German) (2nd ed.). Ranis: Verlag Veit Scherzer. ISBN 978-3-938845-17-2. OCLC 891773959. Wikidata Q131160320.

Military offices
Preceded by Franz Halder	Chief of Staff of the OKH; September 1942 – June 1944	Succeeded by Adolf Heusinger
