= Hans von Greiffenberg =

German general (1893–1951)

Hans Ulrich Ferdinand von Greiffenberg
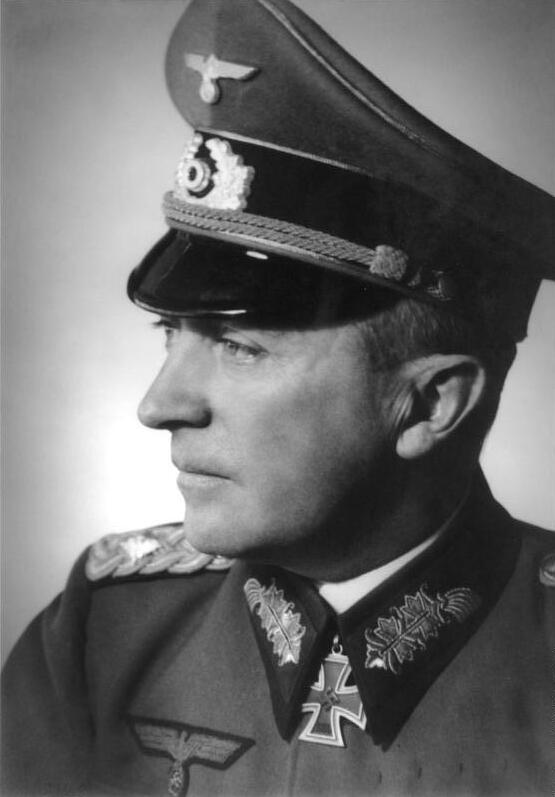
- Born: 12 October 1893
- Died: 30 June 1951 (aged 57)
- Military career
- Allegiance: German Empire; Weimar Republic; Nazi Germany
- Branch: German Srmy
- Service years: 1914–1945
- Rank: General der Infanterie
- Conflicts: World War I; World War II; Invasion of Yugoslavia; Battle of Greece; Operation Barbarossa; Battle of Białystok–Minsk; Battle of Smolensk (1941); Battle of Moscow; Battles of Rzhev; Battle of the Caucasus
- Awards: Knight's Cross of the Iron Cross

Hans von Greiffenberg (12 October 1893 – 30 June 1951) was a general in the army of Nazi Germany during World War II. He was a recipient of the Knight's Cross of the Iron Cross.

== Awards and decorations ==
- Knight's Cross of the Iron Cross on 18 May 1941 as Generalmajor and chief of the general staff of the 12. Armee
