= Hans-Valentin Hube =

German general (1890–1944)

Hans Hube
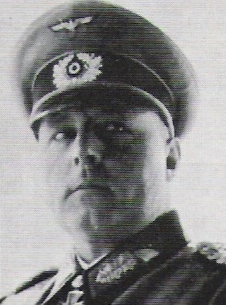
- Hube, c. 1942
- Born: Hans-Valentin Robert Friedrich Hube; 29 October 1890; Naumburg an der Saale, German Empire
- Died: 21 April 1944 (aged 53); Salzburg, Nazi Germany
- Burial place: Invalidenfriedhof, Berlin
- Military career
- Allegiance: German Empire; Weimar Republic; Nazi Germany
- Branch: German Army
- Service years: 1909–1944
- Rank: Generaloberst
- Unit: 7th Division
- Commands: 3rd Infantry Regiment; 16th Infantry Division; 16th Panzer Division; XIV Panzer Corps; 1st Panzer Army
- Conflicts: See battles: World War I; World War II; Battle of France; Invasion of Yugoslavia; Operation Barbarossa; Battle of Kiev; Battle of Stalingrad; Italian Campaign; Allied invasion of Sicily; Operation Avalanche; Korsun-Cherkassy pocket; Kamenets-Podolsky pocket
- Awards: Knight's Cross of the Iron Cross with Oak Leaves, Swords and Diamonds

Hans-Valentin Robert Friedrich Hube (29 October 1890 – 21 April 1944) was a German general during World War II who commanded armoured forces in the invasions of Poland, France and the Soviet Union. In the course of the war, Hube led the 16th Infantry Division, the XIV Panzer Corps and the 1st Panzer Army, rising to the rank of Generaloberst. He died in an air crash on 21 April 1944.

== Early career ==
Hans-Valentin Robert Friedrich Hube was born on 29 October 1890, in Naumburg an der Saale, German Empire to Margarete and Richard Hube. Hube volunteered for military service in the Prussian Army in 1909, and served during World War I where he saw action during the Race to the Sea, and was awarded the Iron Cross 2nd Class and the Knight's Cross of the House Order of Hohenzollern. He had his left arm amputated as a result of injuries sustained at the battle of Verdun. In 1918, following the end of the war which ended with the German Empire's defeat and subsequent collapse, Hube briefly served with the right-wing Freikorps paramilitary during the instability. Hube joined the Reichswehr, the successor of the Imperial German Army after the establishment of the Weimar Republic, and continued his army service in the Wehrmacht after the founding of Nazi Germany, reaching the rank of Oberst in 1936.

== World War II ==
Hube took part in the invasion of Poland and the Battle of France as a regimental commander. During the war with France he issued a pamphlet to his soldiers stating "the deployment of black and colored troops against the German army contradicts the conception of the white race's master role towards the colored people" and that it is "a shame and dishonor, all the more so because our division has had to wage the hardest fights against the Negroes".

Hube was appointed commander of 16th Infantry Division in June 1940. As commander of the 16th Panzer Division, he took part in Operation Barbarossa as part of Field Marshal Gerd von Rundstedt's Army Group South. For this action during the campaign, Hube received the Knight's Cross of the Iron Cross. On 16 January 1942, he was awarded the Oak leaves to the Knight's Cross for his actions in the Battle of Kiev. Hube then led the division during Fall Blau and the Battle of Stalingrad. On 16 September 1942, Hube was given command of XIV Panzer Corps, the parent formation of the 16th Panzer Division.

Hube commanded the XIV Corps during the Soviet counter-offensive, Operation Uranus. He was promoted to General der Panzertruppe and received the Swords to the Knight's Cross with Oak leaves from Adolf Hitler personally on 21 December 1942. During his time at the Führer-Headquarters in Rastenburg, Hube argued strongly, but to no avail, for Hitler to allow the 6th Army to attempt a breakout. Instead, Hitler promised a new relief attack beginning in the middle of February.

After the destruction of the 6th Army, Hube was sent to the Mediterranean front. He created Gruppe Hube in Sicily, a four-division force whose task was to defend the island. With the advent of Operation Husky on 10 July, Hube commanded the overall German defence. On 17 July 1943 Hube was given command of all army and Flak troops on the island. Hube organised the evacuation to the Italian peninsula. He had prepared a strong defensive line, the 'Etna Line' around Messina, that would enable the Germans to make a progressive retreat while evacuating large parts of his army to the mainland. George S. Patton began his assault on the line at Troina, but it was a linchpin of the defense and was stubbornly held. Despite three 'end run' amphibious landings the Germans managed to keep the bulk of their forces beyond reach of capture, and maintain their evacuation plans. Withdrawing a large number of troops from the threat of capture on Sicily represented a major success for the Axis. Hube later took part in the battles defending positions at Salerno during the Allied Operation Avalanche.

Afterward, Hube was moved back to Germany and transferred to the Führerreserve. On 23 October 1943, Hube was designated commander of the 200,000 man 1st Panzer Army, then serving with Army Group South under Field Marshal Erich von Manstein. In February 1944, Hube was officially confirmed as commander of the 1st Panzer Army. Shortly after, III Panzer Corps, one of Hube's units, was required to assist German forces breaking out of the Korsun-Cherkassy pocket. Soon after this, Hube's force was encircled in a pocket near Kamenets-Podolsky. Hube led the breakout, which lasted from 27 March 1944 until 15 April 1944.

== Death ==
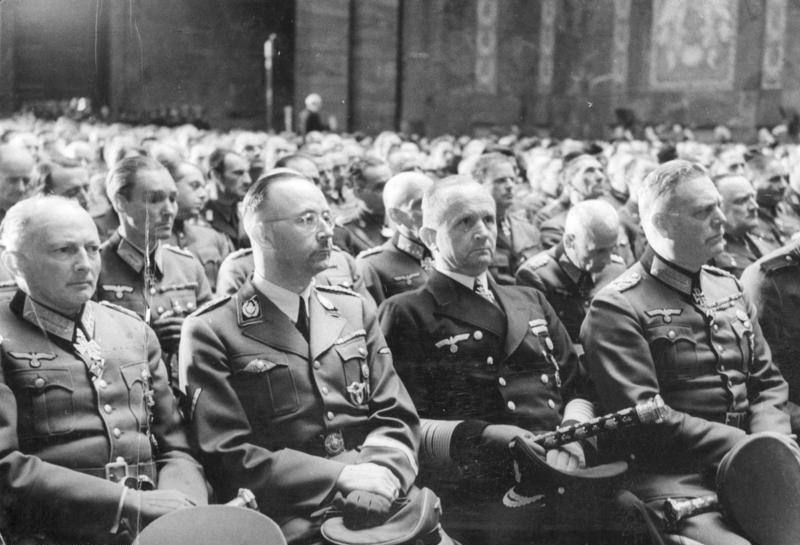
Günther von Kluge, Heinrich Himmler, Karl Dönitz and Wilhelm Keitel (from left to right) at Hube's funeral

On 20 April 1944, Hube returned to Germany to attend Adolf Hitler's 55th birthday celebrations at the Obersalzberg, where Hitler personally awarded him the Diamonds to the Knight's Cross, one of just 27 recipients, and promoted him to Generaloberst for his actions in Sicily, Salerno, and in the Kamenets-Podolsky pocket. Hube was killed the following day when the Heinkel He 111 that was transporting him from Reichenhall-Berchtesgaden Airport in Ainring to the Eastern Front crashed shortly after take-off on 21 April 1944. His adjutant, Major von Schwanenfeld, was not on the flight as he was going on leave. Walther Hewel, who was also in the aircraft, survived, though he was badly injured.

Hube was given a state funeral attended by Adolf Hitler in Berlin on 26 April 1944. His coffin was laid out in the Reich Chancellery, and the eulogy was delivered by Heinz Guderian. The guard of honour consisted of the generals Walther Nehring, Hermann Breith, Heinrich Eberbach and Hans Gollnick. Hube was buried at the Invalids' Cemetery in Berlin.

== Personal life ==
Hube married Annamarie Elisabeth Klara Helene Kosak in Magdeburg, Saxony-Anhalt, on 5 September 1919. His wife, who was born on 23 November 1894, died in Magdeburg on 11 April 1922. The couple had at least two children, Rose-Maria (28 June 1920 – 4 November 2014) and Ulrich Valentin Richard Hube (29 July 1921 – 24 July 1941).

Hube subsequently married Wilhelmine Luise Klara Philippine Ruth Bollert in Berlin on 30 January 1925. Wilhelmine was born on 22 March 1902 and died on 1 March 1942.

Hube's son Ulrich was serving as a lieutenant when he was killed near Michalkina on the Eastern Front in 1941.

Rose-Maria married Fritz von Randow (18 July 1908 – 1 April 1995) on 29 December 1942. At Hitler's request, Randow changed his name to "von Randow-Hube" so that the Hube name would live on following the death of Hube's son. The couple had a daughter in 1943 and a son in 1945. Following the end of the war, Randow dropped the "Hube" from his name. Rose-Maria and von Randow divorced on 1 September 1959.

== Works by Hube ==
- Hube, Hans-Valentin (1925). Der Infanterist [The Infantryman] (in German). Charlottenburg, Germany: Offene Worte. OCLC 643823983.
- Hube, Hans-Valentin (1928). Schützendienst [Rifleman Service] (in German). Charlottenburg, Germany: Offene Worte. OCLC 833701714.
- Hube, Hans-Valentin (1935–1936). Der Infanterist Band 1—Für Kasernenstube und Unterrichtsraum [The Infantryman Volume 1—For Barracks and Classrooms] (in German). Berlin, Germany: Offene Worte. OCLC 248627859.

== Awards ==
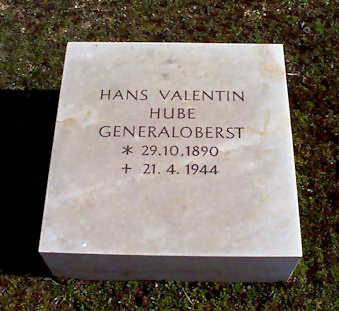
Hube's grave on the Invalids' Cemetery, Berlin

- Iron Cross (1914) 2nd Class (1915) & 1st Class (1916)
- Knight's Cross of the House Order of Hohenzollern with Swords (1918)
- Clasp to the Iron Cross (1939) 2nd Class (24 May 1940) & 1st Class (3 June 1940)
- Knight's Cross of the Iron Cross with Oak Leaves, Swords and Diamonds
  - Knight's Cross on 1 August 1941 as Generalmajor and commander of the 16th Panzer Division
  - 62nd Oak Leaves on 16 January 1942 as Generalmajor and commander of the 16th Panzer Division
  - 22nd Swords on 21 December 1942 as Generalleutnant and commanding general of the XIV Panzer Corps
  - 13th Diamonds on 20 April 1944 as General der Panzertruppe and commander in chief of the 1st Panzer Army
- Promoted to Generalleutnant on 1 January 1942; General der Panzertruppe on 1 October 1942; Generaloberst on 20 April 1944

Military offices
Preceded by Generalleutnant Heinrich Krampf	Commander of 16th Infantry Division; 1 June 1940 – 1 November 1940	Succeeded by General der Infanterie Friedrich-Wilhelm von Chappuis
Preceded by Generaloberst Eberhard von Mackensen	Commander of 1st Panzer Army; 29 October 1943 – 21 April 1944	Succeeded by Generaloberst Erhard Raus
