= Gustav Anton von Wietersheim =

Wehrmacht general (1884–1974)

- Born: 11 February 1884; Breslau, German Empire
- Died: 25 April 1974 (aged 90); Bonn, West Germany
- Military career
- Allegiance: German Empire; Weimar Republic; Nazi Germany
- Branch: German Army
- Service years: 1902–1942
- Rank: General of the Infantry
- Commands: 29th Motorized Infantry Division; XIV Panzer Corps, 1938–1942
- Conflicts: World War I; World War II; Invasion of Poland; Battle of France; Invasion of Yugoslavia; Operation Barbarossa; Case Blue; Battle of Stalingrad
- Awards: Knight's Cross of the Iron Cross and The Clasp to the Iron Cross for the first and second class of the Iron Cross

Gustav Anton von Wietersheim (11 February 1884 – 25 April 1974) was a German general during World War II. He led the XIV Motorized Corps (after 21 June 1942, XIV Panzer Corps) from its creation in 1938 until 14 September 1942 during the Battle of Stalingrad. (Note: Notes on dates related to XIV Motorized/Panzer Corps from Mitcham (2000), p. 263.)

== World War I and inter-war period ==
Born in Breslau in 1884, Wietersheim attended a Kadettenanstalt ('an institute for military cadets') and began his military career in 1902. (Note: Wingate & Kessler (1991) refer to Wietersheim as an "aristocratic Prussian officer.") From 1903 until the end of World War I, Wietersheim continued to serve in the army and was awarded the Iron Cross, 1st and 2nd Class.

After the war, Wietersheim had two simultaneous General Staff assignments as a captain in the staff of the 3rd Division, and also the general staff of the XXV Reserve Corps. (Note: See Wietersheim's bio, from Keiling (1983), p. 370.) He was promoted to major and was made an Abteilungsleiter, or department manager, at the Reich Defense Ministry (Reichswehrministerium), the governmental organ that determined the overarching policy of the Reichswehr in relation to the Weimar Republic. (Note: Wietershiem's bio from Keiling (1983) says, "Anschließend diente er als Major und Abteilungsleiter im Reichs-Kriegsministerium" (transl. subsequently, Wietersheim served as a major and department manager in the Reichs-Kriegsministerium), which is a misleading comment, as this body was not called the Reichskriegsministerium until it was reorganized out of the Weimar's/Reichswehr's Reichwehrministerium upon the formation of the Wehrmacht in 1935; further, Wietersheim's rank of major only lasted until 1930. He did however continue to serve in the ministry until 1936, after the transition and his promotion to lieutenant colonel in 1930.)

During the early 1930s, Wietersheim served as the Chief of Staff of the 3rd Division and continued his work with the Defense Ministry. He was promoted to Oberst ('colonel') in November 1932 and to Generalmajor ('major general') in July 1934. When the Defense Ministry was reorganized as the War Ministry (Reichskriegministerium) under Adolf Hitler, chancellor of Germany and dictator since 1933, in 1935 to match Hitler's simultaneous dissolution of the Reichswehr and creation of the greatly expanded, war-oriented Wehrmacht, Wietersheim was made the Oberquartiermeister I (O. Qu. I) of the General Staff. This position, "immediately subordinated to the Chief of the General Staff," entailed the control of several departments of General Staff, "carrying command of the operations, transport and supply sections." As the General Staff was put on a war footing, this high-level logistics command was a "key position," and Wietersheim, "a brilliant Generalmajor", held this role from March 1935 until later-Field Marshal Erich von Manstein, at that time junior to Wietersheim, took over for him in October 1936. During this time, Wietersheim had been promoted to Generalleutnant, and, after handing over his post as O. Qu. I to Manstein, he took over command of the 29th Infantry Division on 1 October 1936 – his first real position outside the internal command structure of the General Staff.

On 1 February 1938, Wietersheim was promoted to General der Infanterie, and was given command of XIV Motorised Corps, later renamed to XIV Panzer Corps, on 1 April 1938, upon the formation of this unit.

On 10 August 1938, Wietersheim had been called to the Berghof, Hitler's Bavarian retreat, along with a group of other high-ranking Wehrmacht chiefs of staff in order that Hitler could attempt to persuade them that invading Czechoslovakia was a good plan of action. Most of the generals were not convinced by Hitler's arguments, but Generals Jodl and Manstein later commented that Wietersheim, who was the highest-ranking officer in attendance (and the Chief of Staff of General Wilhelm Adam's Second Army Group, which was in charge of any potential Western Front), was the only one present to argue with Hitler directly about the faults in his plan, namely that an invasion of Czechoslovakia would leave the West Wall along the German-French border weak and in risk of being overrun within a few weeks should a French force decide to attack. Jodl reported in his diary that Hitler "became furious" and yelled at Wietersheim: "I say to you Herr General...[the West Wall] will be held not only for three weeks but for three years!"

== World War II ==
Wietersheim's XIV Motorised Corps participated in the Invasion of Poland in 1939, where it fought in the Battle of Radom and the Siege of Warsaw, as well as in the Battle of Kock. The corps later took part in the Battle of France in 1940 as the Wehrmacht drove from the Ardennes to the English Channel.

In June 1941, the unit under Wietersheim participated in Operation Barbarossa, where, as part of the First Panzer Group, it served with Army Group South on the southern sector of the eastern front, advancing via Lviv, Tarnopol and Zhitomir to Kremenchug and Mirgorod, and south to Marfinskaya in the Mius sector. The corps spearheaded First Panzer Group's difficult and impressive drive to Kiev during the Battle of Kiev (1941), and participated in the Battle of Rostov (1941).

Early in the Battle of Stalingrad, Wietersheim used his tanks to protect the advance from the Don River to the Volga, which was criticized for being an inappropriate use of an armored formation. Soon after, having encountered exceptionally strong resistance from Red Army troops, he suggested a partial withdrawal to the Don, due to high casualties among his troops in the salient north of Stalingrad, just to the west of the Volga. Deemed acts of incompetence and defeatism, he was relieved of command on 14 September by the head of the German Sixth Army, Friedrich Paulus, and subsequently dismissed by Hitler.

Historian Alan Clark reported that Wietersheim returned to Germany after his dismissal, only reappearing in any military context in 1945 as a private in a Pomeranian Volkssturm unit.

== Post-war ==
Wietersheim, like most high-ranking German generals, gave his testimony to the post-war Nuremberg Military Tribunals, held from 1946 to 1949. The Telford Taylor Papers, held at the Diamond Law Library at Columbia University Law School, list Wietersheim as having been interrogated on 13 February 1948. He died in 1974 in Bonn, the capital of West Germany.

== Sources ==
- Clark, Alan (n.d.). Barbarossa: The Russian German Conflict, 1941–1945. New York: W. Morrow.
- Duffy, James P.; Ricci, Vincent L. (1992). Target Hitler: The Plots to Kill Adolf Hitler. Westport: Greenwood Publishing Group.
- Glantz, David M.; House, Jonathan (2009). To the Gates of Stalingrad: Soviet-German Combat Operations, April-August 1942. Lawrence, Kansas: University Press of Kansas. ISBN 9780700616305.
- Keiling, Wolf (1983). Die Generale des Heeres (in German). Archived from the original on 18 May 2011.
- Lippman, David H. (n.d.). "World War II Plus 55 - Sept. 20th to 26th, 1942". USS Washington BB56 - WWII+55. Archived from the original on 6 August 2007.
- Mitcham, Samuel W. (2000). The Panzer Legions: A Guide to the German Army Tank Divisions of World War II and Their Commanders (Westport. Greenwood Publishing Group.
- Mitcham, Samuel W.; Mueller, Gene (2012). Hitler's Commanders: Officers of the Wehrmacht, the Luftwaffe, the Kriegsmarine, and the Waffen-SS. Rowman & Littlefield Publishers. ISBN 9781442211544.
- Shirer, William Lawrence (1960), The Rise and Fall of the Third Reich: A History of Nazi Germany, New York City: Simon & Schuster, ASIN B0766DKDLR, LCCN 60006729, OCLC 1286630, OL 5794925M, Wikidata Q138029595
- Taylor, Telford (n.d.). "Telford Taylor (1908-1998) (Papers: 1918-1998; Bulk: 1949-1992)". Series 5, Nuremberg Military Tribunal (NMT) (1946-1949). Telford Taylor Papers, Diamond Law Library, ref: NMT-OCCWC: Evidence Division, Interrogation Branch - Interrogation Summary - Wietersheim, Gustav Anton von (13 February 1948), Box 4, Folder 57. Archived from the original on 4 July 2008.
- Wingate, John; Kessler, Leo (1991). Betrayal at Venlo: The Secret Story of Appeasement and Treachery, 1939–1945. London: L. Cooper.

Military offices
Preceded by None	Commander of 29th Infantry Division (Motorized); 1 October 1936 – 1 March 1938	Succeeded by Generalleutnant Joachim Lemelsen
Preceded by none	Commander of XIV Army Corps (Motorized); 1 April 1938 to 14 September 1942	Succeeded by General der Panzertruppe Hans-Valentin Hube
