= XIV Panzer Corps =

- XIV. Panzerkorps
- Active: 1 April 1938 – 8 May 1945
- Country: Nazi Germany
- Branch: Army
- Type: Panzer corps
- Role: Armoured warfare
- Size: Corps
- Engagements: World War II

Commanders
- Notable commanders: Hermann Balck; Hans-Valentin Hube; Fridolin von Senger und Etterlin

XIV Panzer Corps (also: XIV Army Corps or XIV. Armeekorps) was a corps-level formation of the German Army which fought on both the Eastern Front and in the Italian Campaign.

== History ==
The XIV Panzer Corps was originally formed as the XIV Motorised Corps in Magdeburg on 1 April 1938 to take command of units in the process of motorisation, where it was placed under the leadership of Gustav von Wietersheim. The Corps participated in the Invasion of Poland in 1939 where it fought in the Battle of Kock. The Corps later saw action in the Battle of France in 1940, as part of Panzer Group Kleist, where the 2nd Motorised Division, 13th Motorised Division and the 29th Motorised Division served under it. It was renamed the XIV Panzer Corps on 21 June 1942.

In June 1941, it participated in Operation Barbarossa, where as part of Panzer Group 1, it served with Army Group South on the southern sector of the eastern front, advancing via Lviv, Ternopil and Zhytomyr to Kremenchuk and in the Mius sector.

It took part in Case Blue where it commanded the 60th Motorised Infantry Division, 16th Panzer Division and the 3rd Motorised Infantry Division. Elements of the Corps were the first German units to reach Stalingrad. It was surrounded in the Stalingrad pocket in November 1942. Hitler ordered its commander, General der Panzertruppe Hans-Valentin Hube, to be flown out of the Stalingrad pocket on 15 January 1943. Generalleutnant Helmuth Schlömer, who succeeded Hube, surrendered the Corps to the Soviets.

Re-formed and reorganized at Dnipro and Zaporizhzhia in 1943, it was transferred to the West and directed all German forces in the Battle of Sicily under Hube where it commanded the 1st Parachute Division, 15th Panzergrenadier Division, 1st Paratroop Panzer Division Hermann Göring and elements of the 29th Panzergrenadier Division. It was briefly commanded by Hermann Balck in September and October 1943, before he was seriously injured in a plane crash.

The Corps also participated in the Battle of Monte Cassino under the command of General von Senger und Etterlin and included among its formations, the 1st Parachute Division, the 15th Panzergrenadier Division and the 29th Panzergrenadier Division, which had previously fought under it in Sicily. It remained on the Italian front until its surrender at the end of the war.

== Commanders ==
- General der Infanterie Gustav Anton von Wietersheim 1 April 1938 – 13 September 1942
- Generalleutnant Hans-Valentin Hube 14 September 1942 – January 1943
- Generalleutnant Helmuth Schlömer 17 January 1943 – 4 March 1943
- General der Panzertruppe Hans-Valentin Hube 5 March 1943 – 1 September 1943
- General der Panzertruppe Hermann Balck 2 September 1943 – 30 September 1943
- General der Panzertruppe Hans-Valentin Hube 1 October – 21 October 1943
- General der Panzertruppe Fridolin von Senger und Etterlin 22 October 1943 – May 1945
