= 206th Field Artillery Regiment =

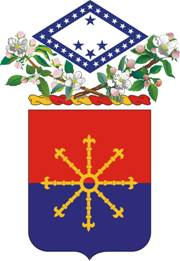
- Coat of arms
- Active: 1917–present
- Country: United States
- Allegiance: Arkansas
- Branch: Army National Guard
- Type: Light artillery
- Role: Direct support artillery
- Size: One battalion
- Garrison/HQ: Russellville, Arkansas
- Nickname: Aleutian
- Motto: Never Give Up
- Anniversaries: 3 June, Dutch Harbor Day
- Equipment: M119 howitzer, 105mm towed; M777 howitzer, 155mm towed
- Engagements: World War I; World War II; Aleutian Islands Campaign; Battle of Dutch Harbor; Rhineland; Central Europe; Operation Iraqi Freedom; Transition of Iraq; Iraqi Governance; Iraqi Surge

Commanders
- Battalion Commander: Eric E. Gonzalez

Insignia
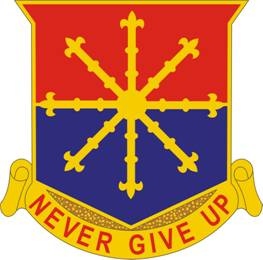
- Distinctive unit insignia

- 39th Infantry Brigade Combat Team shoulder sleeve insignia

The 206th Field Artillery Regiment is a United States artillery regiment, currently represented in the Arkansas Army National Guard by the 1st Battalion, 206th Field Artillery, Headquartered at Russellville, Arkansas. The 1–206th FA is an element of the 39th Infantry Brigade Combat Team.

The regiment's history begins with the creation of the 3rd Arkansas Infantry in 1917 as a part of the expansion of the guard following the Mexican Expedition and just before World War I. The unit was reorganized for World War I as the 141st Machine Gun Battalion, an element of the 39th Infantry Division. The unit deployed to France but did not see combat before the end of the war. Between World War I and II, the unit was reorganized as the 206th Coast Artillery (Anti-Aircraft) and many of its units were stationed at state colleges. The 206th CA was mobilized for World War II and participated in the Battle of Dutch Harbor, Alaska, on 3 and 4 June 1942. Following World War II the unit was reorganized as the 206th Artillery and served as the Division Artillery (DIVARTY) for the 39th Infantry Division.

After the re-organization and redesignation of the 39th Infantry Division as the 39th Infantry Brigade (Separate), the regiment was represented by the 5th Battalion, 206th Field Artillery, which served as the direct support artillery battalion to the brigade until 1996. The regiment's current active battalion, 1st Battalion, 206th Field Artillery serves as the direct support battalion to the 39th Brigade and has been mobilized to two deployments in support of Operation Iraqi Freedom.

== History ==
=== World War I ===
==== Activation of the 3rd Arkansas Infantry Regiment ====
The United States declared war on Germany 6 April 1917 less than two months after the last Arkansas National Guard units completed mustering out from duty on the Mexican border. At this time the Arkansas Guard consisted of two infantry regiments, the 1st and 2nd Arkansas, which had each been mobilized for service on the Mexican border. The National Defense Act of 1916 had provided for a massive expansion of the National Guard, from a force of just over 100,000 to over 400,000.

While a 3rd Arkansas Infantry had existed in the Arkansas State Guard prior to the Spanish–American War, the unit had been inactivated and never reorganized following the war with Spain. On 17 April 1917, plans for the 3rd Arkansas Regiment were formulated: new units were to be raised in sixteen cities to support the new regiment. On 16 May 1917, it was announced that Little Rock was one of the cities to be allowed a new infantry company which would be part of the 3rd Arkansas Regiment. 1LT Hower Brewer, a doctor from Johnson county, had returned from medical service on the Mexican Border to form a company for the new regiment. When Brewer issued a call for volunteers, 415 men reported for enlistment, and 161 passed the physically exam. During the summer of 1917 these recruits camped on the Johnson courthouse lawn until they were mustered into the service as Company L, of the Third Arkansas. Enlistments were to be for the duration of the war. The pay per month for the enlisted men was as follows:

Rank	Pay
Sergeants, First Class	$45
Sergeants	$36
Privates, First Class	$18
Privates	$15
Cooks	$30

To qualify for a commission in the Guard, an individual had to be a former officer or private of the Guard, officer on reserve or unassigned list, active or retired officer of the regular Army, Navy or Marine Corps; graduate of the United States Military or Naval Academy or graduate of a school, college or university where military science under a regular army officer was taught.

The age limits that were established for officers of the new units were these:

Rank	Age requirements
Colonel	21 to 65 years
Lieutenant Colonel	21 to 50 years
Majors	21 to 45 years
Captain	21 to 40 years
First Lieutenant	21 to 30 years

Recruitment for men in Little Rock was carried out by seventeen girls wearing badges bearing the words, "If You Are A Real Man Enlist". The girls distributed buttonhole tags with, "Are You A Slacker?" The other side of the tag read, "Are You A Man?" The girls worked until 5 June 1917, when the draft law became effective.

==== Mobilization ====
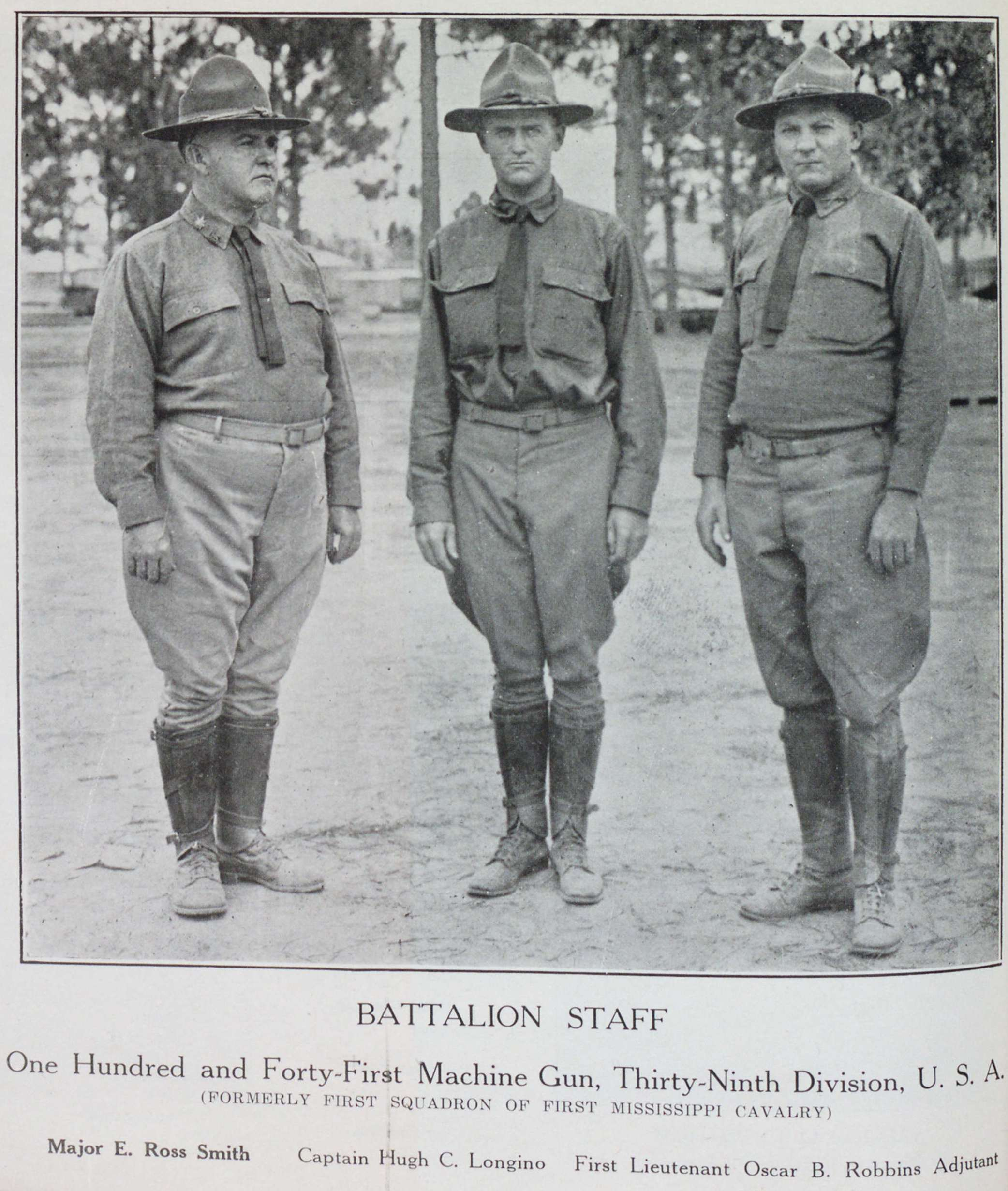
While the caption indicates that the 141st MG BN was formed from a Mississippi unit, the unit was actually formed from 3rd Battalion, 3rd Arkansas Infantry Regiment

On 18 May 1917, the Arkansas National Guard was notified that on 5 August 1917, the Guard as a whole would be called into federal service. On 16 July 1917, the 3rd Arkansas included the following units:

Regiment	Unit	Station	Officers	Enlisted
3rd Regiment	Company A	Augusta	3	150
	Company B	Little Rock	3	150
	Company C	Hot Springs and Camden	3	160
	Company D	Morrilton	3	150
	Company E	Newport	3	150
	Company F	Batesville	3	160
	Company G	Walnut Ridge	3	160
	Company H	Paragould	3	160
	Company I	Ashdown and Nashville	3	150
	Company K	Magnolia	3	150
	Company L	Fordyce	3	150
	Company M	Clarksville	3	150
	Headquarters Company	Little Rock	2	97
	Supply Company	Little Rock	2	37
	Machine Gun Company	Helena	4	74
	Medical Corps,	Eureka Springs	4	33

On 18 July 1917, it was announced that Arkansas National Guard would move to Alexandria, Louisiana, for training as part of the Eighteenth Division. Alexandria, Louisiana, was the location of Camp Beauregard which was named after General P. G. T. Beauregard, C.S.A.

The 3rd Arkansas Infantry Regiment mobilized 5 August and was encamped around the new state capitol by 8 August. The 2nd and 3rd Infantry Regiments were examined for Federal service on 6 August 1917, at Ft. Brough (located on the Capital grounds). The regiments, under the control of General Wood, were sent to Ft. Roots and moved to Camp Pike by 24 August 1917. The Commander of the supply company of the 3rd Arkansas received instructions from the Augusta Arsenal to go into the open market and buy mess kits to complete the equipment needed for the new regiments. In mid-September the Arkansas units were notified that they were to be part of a newly created division, initially called the 18th but later re-designated as the 39th Division.

The 3rd Arkansas Regiment used sixty coaches, three standard Pullmans, six baggage cars, twelve boxcars, and one stock car, and set off on a train journey to Camp Beauregard, Louisiana, lasting about fourteen hours; they mustered into federal service 27 September – 18 October 1917.

==== Creation of 141st Machine Gun Battalion ====
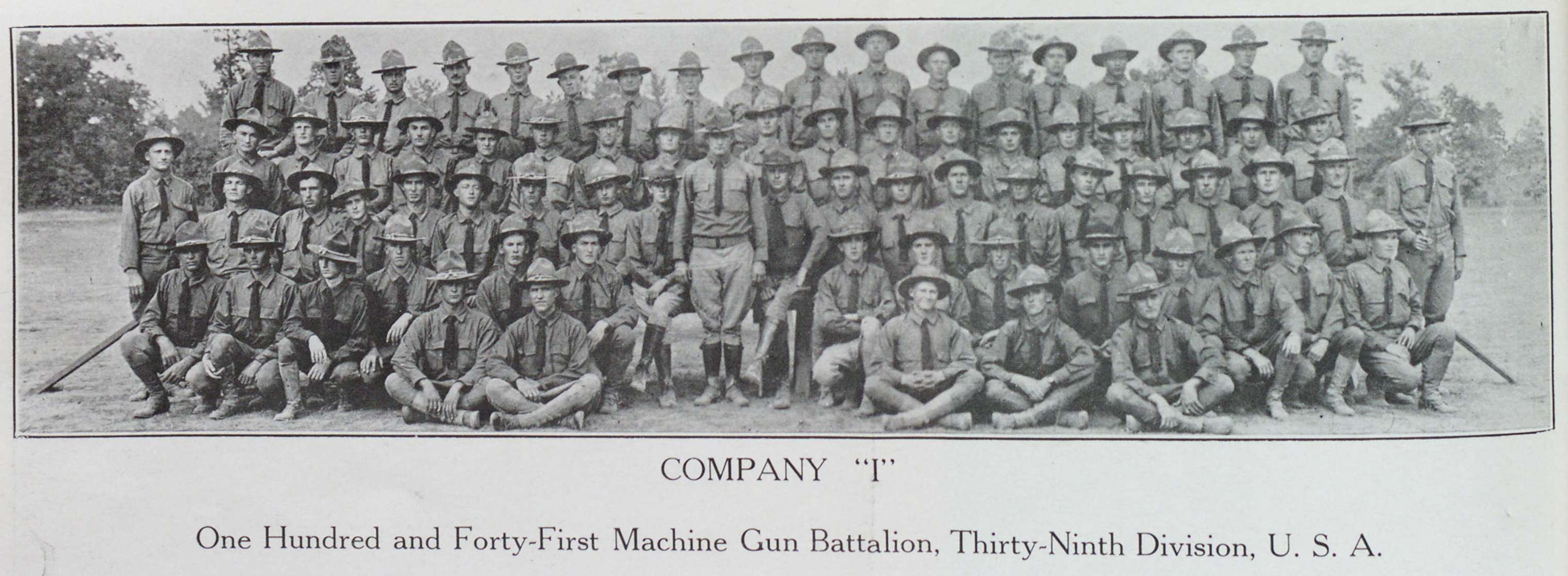

The Arkansas troops were reorganized after their transfer to Camp Beauregard under a new national system for numbering army regiments. The 1st Arkansas Infantry became the 153rd Infantry Regiment, the 2nd Regiment (minus its Machine Gun Company) became the 142nd Field Artillery Regiment. The 3rd Arkansas Infantry, which had reported to Camp Beauregard with over 1800 soldiers, was divided into two new units. The following units were created, from the old 3rd Arkansas Infantry Regiment:

  - 154th Infantry Regiment
  - 141st Machine Gun Battalion.

The 141st Machine Gun Battalion was composed of members of the former 3rd Battalion, 3rd Arkansas Infantry Regiment and the Machine Gun Company from the 2nd Arkansas Infantry.

The 18th Infantry Division was re-designated as the 39th "Delta" Division, U.S.N.G., and the Arkansas units were assigned to the 77th Infantry Brigade (153rd Infantry, 154th Infantry, and the 141st Machine Gun Battalion).

==== Deployed to France ====
In May 1918, twenty percent of the privates of the 39th Division were given the opportunity to volunteer for immediate overseas duty. In the rush to help end the war officers resigned their commissions so they would be qualified for duty overseas before the war was over. The officers did not accompany their troops but remained at Camp Beauregard with the other eighty percent of the troops who were still in training. As result the first Arkansas National Guard soldier to die in combat during World War I, Private Robert Springer, a former member of the 3rd Arkansas, was killed before the unit had even left Camp Beauregard.

The first unit of the 39th Division arrived in France on 12 August 1918, and the last unit arrived on 12 September 1918. It was then sent to the St. Florent area, southwest of Bourges, where it was designated as a replacement division. In November 1918, it moved to St. Aignan. There several of the units were transferred to combat divisions. The 141st Machine Gun Battalion was deployed to near Chaumont, Department of Haute-Marne, France. Soon after reaching its billets an order was received from G. H. Q. designating this unit as the 141st Anti-aircraft Machine Gun Battalion and ordering it to proceed to Langres, France for training. The organization finished the war at Noigent waiting for transportation. Letters from soldier of the 3rd Arkansas were received in Arkansas.

The unit returned to the United States and was discharged in 1919. Demobilized 13 January 1919 at Camp Beauregard, Louisiana.

=== Between the World Wars ===
As a part of the reorganization and expansion of the National Guard that followed the passage of the National Defense Act of 1916 Arkansas was allotted an Anti Aircraft Machine Gun Battalion and was authorized under orders from the War Department to reorganize the 141st Machine Gun Battalion. The unit received federal recognition on 21 June 1921. At the same time, orders were issued placing all anti-aircraft units under the Coast Artillery Corps. Arkansas (and other Middle West states) had several units transferred to this branch of the service regardless of the fact that the nearest coast line was some 700 miles away. 141st Machine Gun Battalion was a Corps unit and not a part of any Coast Artillery Regiment. The unit was stationed as follows:

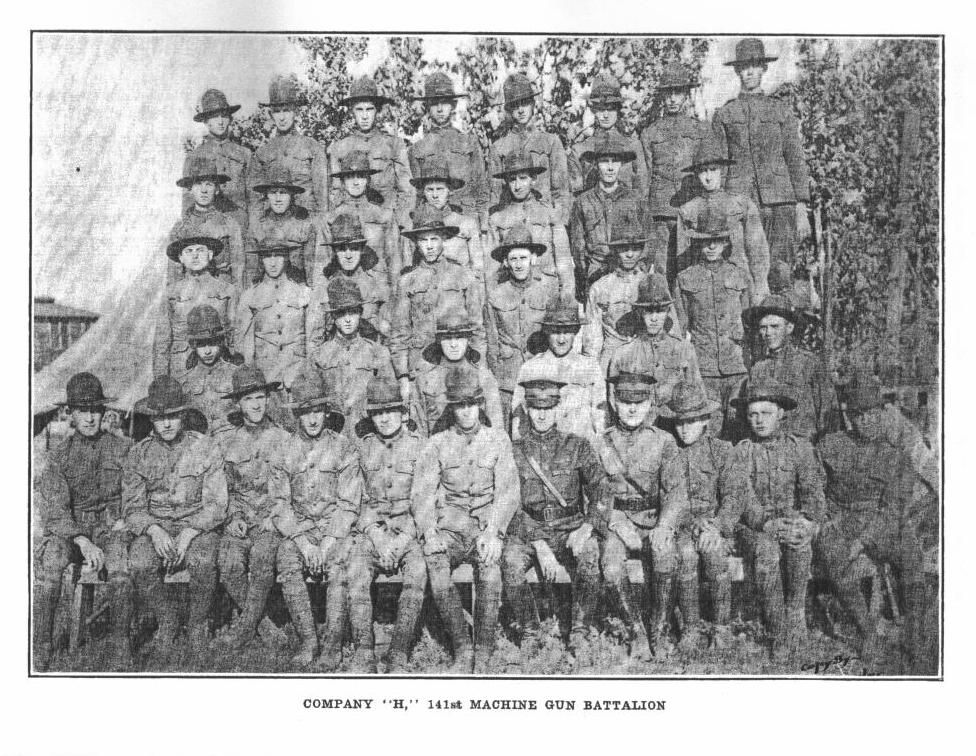
Company H, 141st Machine Gun Battalion, Arkansas National Guard, 1921–1923

Unit	Station	Commander	Federal Recognition Dates
Headquarters Battery,	Nashville	MAJ Charles S. Garrett	21 June 1921
Battery E	Heber Springs	Captain Sam C. Herrin	7 June 1921
Battery F	Blue Mountain	Captain H. W. TrIey	11 June 1921
Battery G	Ozark	Captain O. W. Kayer	23 June 1921
Battery H	Little Rock	Captain Harry W. Smith	24 June 1921

==== Birth of 206th ====
The 141st Machine Gun Battalion (Anti Aircraft) was reorganized and redesignated in 1923 as the 206th Coast Artillery (Anti Aircraft). The units of the former 141st became the 2nd Battalion of the newly formed 206th Coast Artillery (Anti Aircraft). MAJ Charles Garrett, who had commanded the 141st Machine Gun Battalion was promoted to Lieutenant Colonel and designated as the Regimental Executive Officer of the newly formed, 206th Coast Artillery. The 206th Coast Artillery took its coat of arms from Chaumont, one of the principal towns in the Department of Haute-Marne, France, where the 141st Machine Gun Battalion was stationed during World War I. While the 2nd Battalion headquarters initially remained at Nashville, this changed in the mid-1920s when several of the 206th Coast Artillery units were restationed in order to place them at the state's colleges. The 206th batteries stationed at state colleges were made up of the cadet corps for the newly formed Reserve Officer's Training Corps (ROTC) located at the colleges. Often the officers of these batteries were drawn from the college faculty while the soldiers were students. By 1932 the unit was stationed as follows:

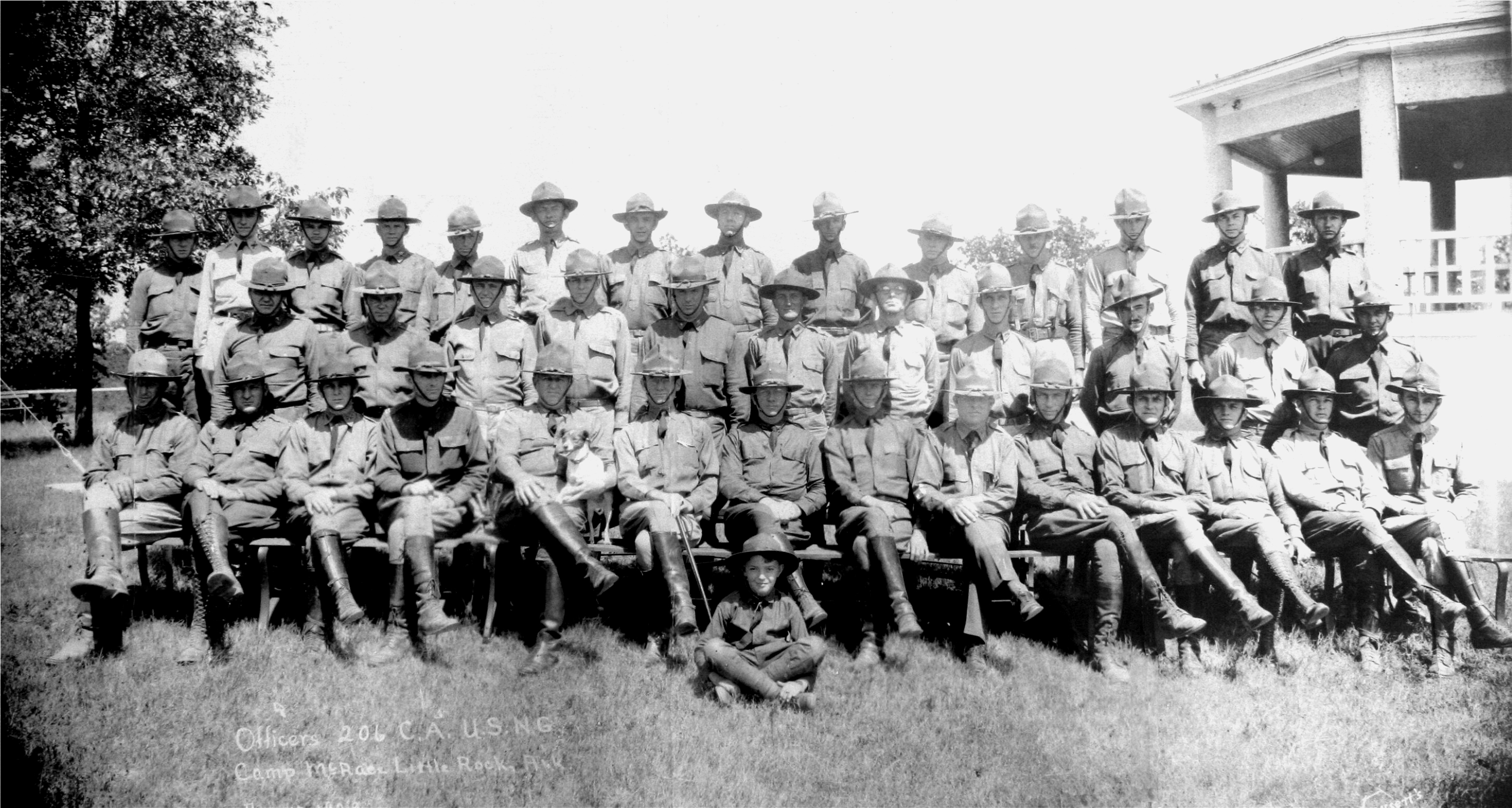
Officers of the 206th C.A. U.S.N.G. Camp McRae, Little Rock, 1920s

Battery A(Searchlight) 206 Coast Artillery (Anti Aircraft) 1932, Camp Pike, Little Rock, Arkansas

Unit	Station	College
Headquarters and Headquarters Battery,	Marianna	
Regimental Band	Marianna	
Regimental Medics	North Little Rock	
Headquarters 1st Battalion and Ammunition Train	El Dorado	
Battery A	Little Rock	
Battery B	Monticello	Arkansas Agricultural and Mechanical College
Battery C	Jonesboro	Arkansas State College
Battery D	Russellville	Arkansas Polytechnic College
Headquarters 2nd Battalion and Ammunition Train *	Newport	
Battery E	Camden	
Battery F	Russellville	Arkansas Polytechnic College
Battery G	Helena	
Battery H	Hot Springs	

==== Training ====
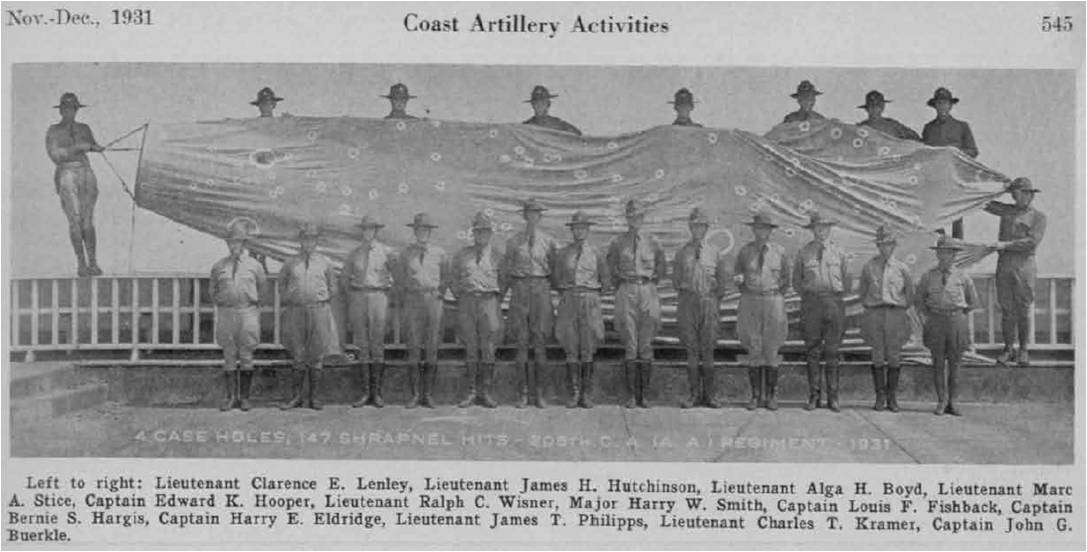
Photo of the results of target practice at Fort Barrancas Florida, 23–29 August 1931.

206th Coast Artillery often traveled out of state to conduct training at U.S. Army facilities due to the lack of artillery ranges within the state. The 206th Coast Artillery conducted summer encampments at:

- Fort Sill, OK, 1925, 1926, and 1927
- Fort Barrancas, FL, 1931, 1932, 1933 and 1934,
- Fort Sheridian, IL, 1935
- Camp Palacios, Texas
- Fort Snelling, MN, 1940
- and Camp Pike, AR.

=== World War II ===
The 206th Coast Artillery Regiment (CA) was inducted into federal service 6 January 1941 at home stations as a part of a one-year mobilization of the National Guard in preparation for World War II. Later the regiment moved to Fort Bliss, Texas and conducted its initial training.

==== "To the Nickel" ====
The 206th (CA) competed with the 200th Coast Artillery (United States) from New Mexico to determine which would deploy to either the Philippine Islands or the Aleutian Islands. The Aleutians are an island chain off the southwest coast of Alaska. The 200th CA was a former cavalry unit recently converted to coast artillery. The 206th CA actually provided cadre to assist with the training of the 200th CA, however many of the members of the 200th CA spoke fluent Spanish, which would be a great advantage in the Philippines. According to legend, the final determination was made by the flip of a nickel. The 200th CA won the coin toss and was selected to deploy to the Philippine Islands. The 200th CA was decimated in the fall of the Philippine Islands and its survivors participated in the Bataan Death March. To this day, members of the 206th traditionally offer the toast "To the Nickel" at all formal gatherings in memory of this fateful decision.

==== Battle of Dutch Harbor ====
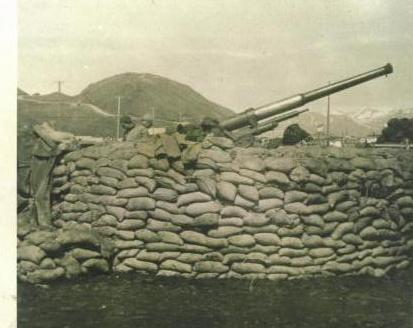
3-inch anti aircraft gun section from Battery D, 206th Coast Artillery at its second position during the Battle of Dutch Harbor, 4 June 1942

The 206th Coast Artillery Regiment was deployed to Dutch Harbor in the Aleutian Islands, Alaska and had been on station for approximately four months when the Japanese Navy attacked Pearl Harbor on 7 December 1941. The 206th CA was equipped with the M1918 3-inch Gun (an older model with a vertical range of 8,200 m), .50-caliber machine guns, and 60-inch (1.5 m) Sperry searchlights. In June 1942, as part of the Japanese operations against Midway Island, the Japanese attacked the Aleutian Islands, starting with the Battle of Dutch Harbor, beginning what would become known as the Aleutian Islands Campaign. A Japanese task force led by Admiral Kakuji Kakuta bombed Dutch Harbor on Unalaska Island twice, once on 3 June and again the following day. Many members of the 206th were awakened on 3 June by the sound of bombs and gunfire. While the unit had been on alert for an attack for many days, there was no specific warning of the attack before the Japanese planes arrived over Dutch Harbor. With no clear direction from headquarters, other than an initial cease fire order which was quickly withdrawn, gun crews from every battery quickly realized the danger, ran to their guns stationed around the harbor and began to return fire. In addition to their 3-inch guns, 37mm guns and .50 caliber machine guns, members of the unit fired their rifles and one even claimed to have hurled a wrench at a low flying enemy plane. Several members reported being able to clearly see the faces of the Japanese aviators as they made repeated runs over the island. The highest casualties on the first day occurred when bombs struck barracks 864 and 866 in Fort Mears, killing seventeen men of the 37th Infantry and eight from the 151st Engineers.

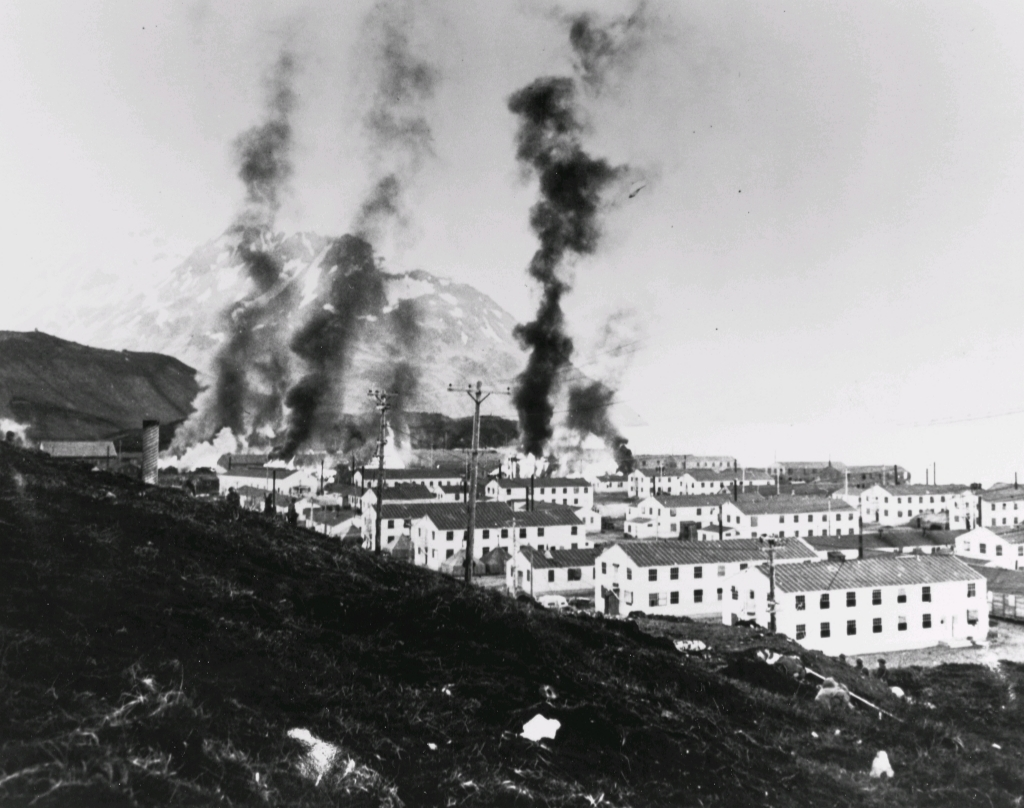
Buildings burning after the first enemy attack on Dutch Harbor, 3 June 1942.

The 206th CA spent much of the night of 3 to 4 June moving their guns down off the mountain tops surrounding the harbor and into the city. Civilian contractors offered to help and were put to work filling sandbags to protect the new gun positions. When the Japanese returned on 4 June, the Zeros concentrated on strafing the gun positions while their bombers destroyed the fuel tanks located at the harbor. After the fuel tanks, the enemy concentrated on the ships in the harbor, the Fillmore and the Gillis. Driven away from these two targets by intense anti aircraft fire, they finally succeeded in destroying the Northwestern which was mistaken for a warship because of its large size. The Northwestern was actually a transport ship that was beached and its power plant was being used to produce steam and electricity for the shore installations. The damage caused to the Dutch Harbor Naval facilities and nearby Fort Mears, including the destruction of gas storage facilities and the destruction of the Northwestern, was strategically insignificant. The significant outcomes of the battle were the discovery of a secret U.S. airbase in the Aleutian Islands, previously unknown to the Japanese, and the recovery of a Japanese Zero aircraft by U.S. forces following the battle. The regiment sustained seven killed in action during the bombing of Dutch Harbor.

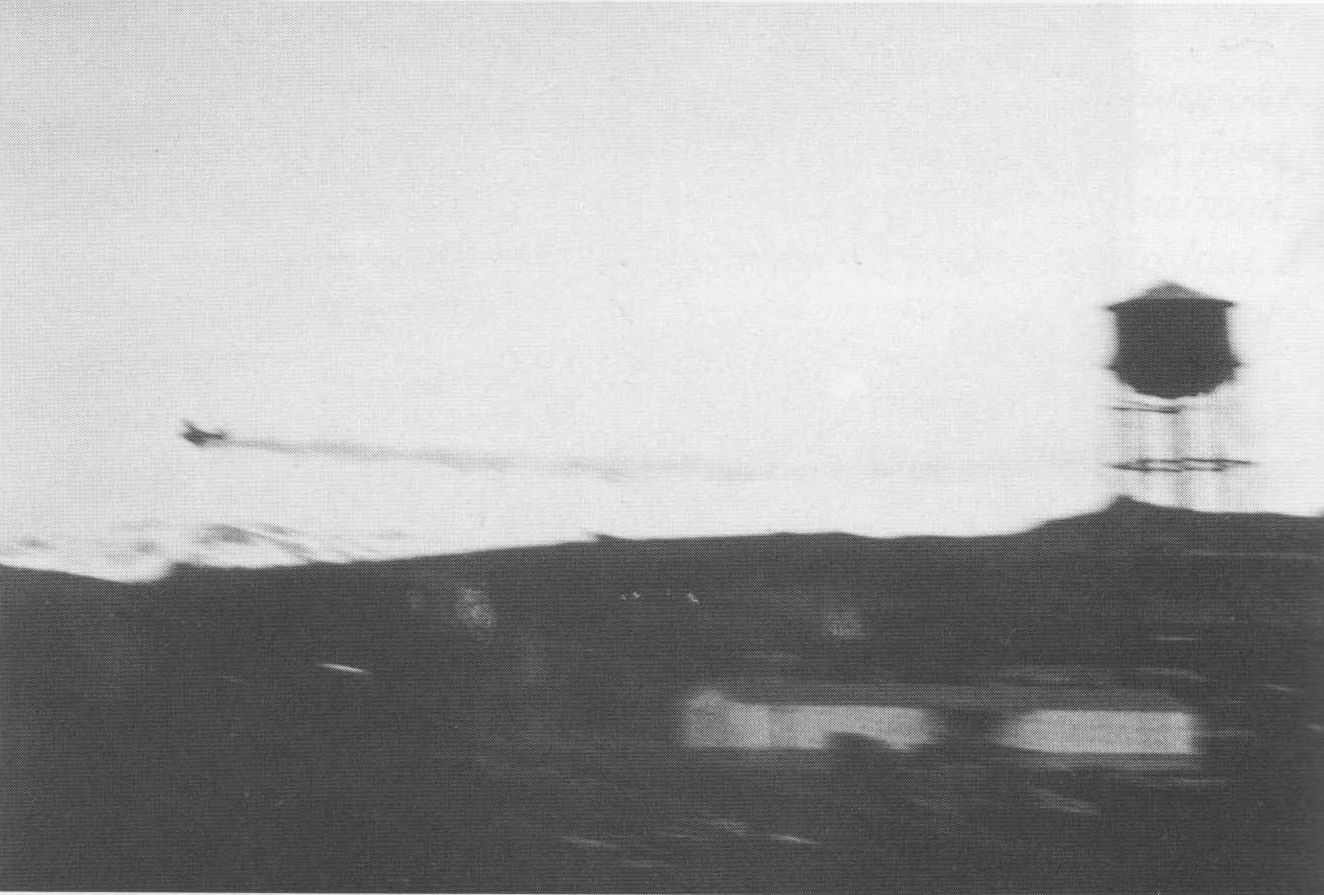
An Imperial Japanese Navy Zero aircraft piloted by Tadayoshi Koga is damaged by anti-aircraft fire over Dutch Harbor, Alaska on 3 June 1942.

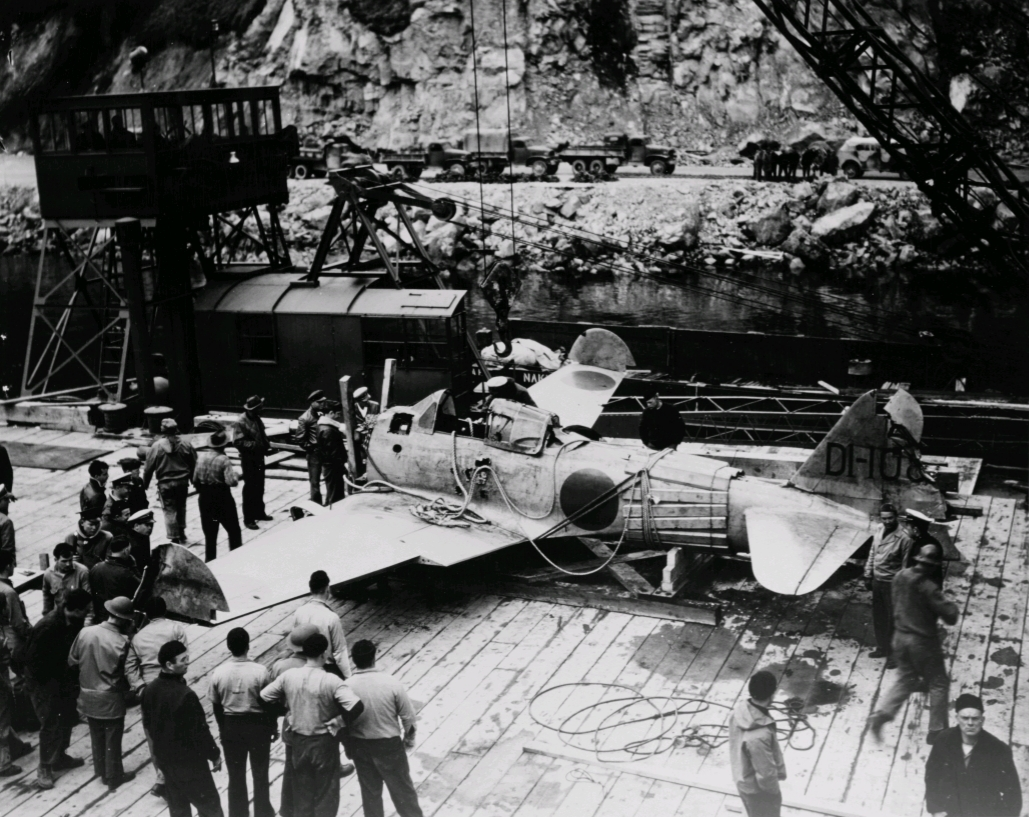
Loading of the Akutan Zero onto a barge

Members of the 206th CA claimed credit for the shoot down of the Akutan Zero flown by Flight Petty Officer Tadayoshi Koga, which was captured intact following the battle and became the second flyable Zero acquired by the United States during the war. Following its capture the aircraft was repaired, and then flown by American test pilots. As a result of information gained during these tests American tacticians were able to devise tactics to defeat the Zero, which was the Imperial Japanese Navy's primary fighter plane throughout the war. The Akutan Zero has been described as "a prize almost beyond value to the United States".

Following the bombing, Admiral Kakuta utilized his invasion force to occupy the Islands of Attu and Kiska in the Aleutian Island chain. Attu was eventually retaken by U.S. forces on 29 May 1943 after a spectacular Banzai charge by Japanese forces. Only 28 of the estimated 2500 Japanese defenders survived the battle. Kiska was retaken on 15 August 1943 by U.S. Forces, including the 2nd Battalion, 153rd Infantry Regiment, Arkansas National Guard. The Japanese had secretly abandoned Kiska only days before the invasion by U.S. forces. The recapture of Kiska brought the Aleutian Islands Campaign to a close.

==== Breakup and reorganization ====
With the threat to the Aleutian Islands at an end, the regiment was redeployed back to Fort Bliss in March 1944. As part of an elimination of regiments in all arms except the infantry, the 206th was broken up. On 25 March, the regimental headquarters was disbanded, while on 1 April, the 2nd Battalion was reorganized and redesignated as the 597th Antiaircraft Artillery Battalion (Automatic Weapons) and the 3rd Battalion as the 339th Antiaircraft Artillery Searchlight Battalion. As a result of the dwindling threat from Axis aircraft and a shortage of infantry replacements, the number of American antiaircraft units began to be reduced and their personnel reassigned for retraining in other arms, particularly infantry. The former 1st Battalion, which was not redesignated, moved to Camp Chaffee, Arkansas, where it was inactivated on 9 May 1944, and the 339th Antiaircraft Artillery Searchlight Battalion was inactivated at Fort Bliss on 12 June 1944.

Most former members of the 206th were assigned to the 86th Infantry Division, stationed at Camp Livingston, Louisiana, or the 87th Infantry Division, stationed at Fort Jackson, South Carolina. These two divisions were among nearly two dozen other low-priority divisions that had given up large numbers of their own men as overseas replacements, and were replenished with men reassigned from inactivated antiaircraft and tank destroyer units, former Army Specialized Training Program students, former aviation cadets, and men who were given the opportunity to volunteer for the infantry from other branches of the Army.

The 597th Antiaircraft Artillery Battalion (Automatic Weapons) departed for Europe via the New York Port of Embarkation on 10 December 1944, arriving in England on 16 December and moving to France on 2 March 1945. After seeing action in the Rhineland and Central Europe campaigns, the battalion arrived back in the United States on 11 December 1945 and was inactivated on 12 December 1945 at Camp Kilmer, New Jersey.

=== Cold War ===
After World War II the regiment underwent several consolidations and reorganizations described in the regiment's Lineage and Honors Certificate as follows:

The Headquarters and Headquarters Battery (HHB), 206th Coast Artillery was reconstituted 25 August 1945 in the Arkansas National Guard.

==== Stationing of 437th FA, 1946 ====
The 1st Battalion, 206th Coast Artillery, was reconstituted 25 August 1945 in the Arkansas National Guard and consolidated 21 October 1946 with the 437th Field Artillery Battalion (constituted 27 May 1946 in the Arkansas National Guard and assigned to the 39th Infantry Division) designated as the 437 Field Artillery Battalion. The 437th FA was reorganized and federally recognized 26 November 1946 with headquarters at Hazen, Arkansas.

Headquarters	Battery	Station
437th Field Artillery Battalion	Headquarters and Headquarters Battery	Hazen
	Battery A, 437th FA	Hot Springs
	Battery B, 437th FA	Newport
	Battery C, 437th FA	Dumas
	Service Battery, 437th FA	Brinkley

==== Stationing of the 445th FA, 1946 ====
The 597th Antiaircraft Artillery Automatic Weapons Battalion (formerly the 2nd Battalion, 206th Coast Artillery) was consolidated 21 October 1946 with the 445th Field Artillery Battalion (constituted 27 May 1946 in the Arkansas National Guard and assigned to the 39th Infantry Division) and designated as the 445th Field Artillery Battalion. The 445th was reorganized and federally recognized 19 November 1946 with headquarters at Marianna, Arkansas.

Headquarters	Battery	Station
445th Field Artillery Battalion	Headquarters and Headquarters Battery	Marianna
	Battery A, 445th FA	Helena
	Battery B, 445th FA	Newport
	Battery C, 445th FA	Brinkley
	Service Battery, 445th FA	Wynne

==== Stationing of 206th Artillery, 1959 ====
The Headquarters and Headquarters Battery, 206th Coast Artillery, and the 437th and 445th Field Artillery Battalions were consolidated 1 June 1959 with the 326th Antiaircraft Artillery Battalion (organized and Federally recognized 22 June 1955 with headquarters at West Memphis) to form the 206th Artillery, a parent regiment under the Combat Arms Regimental System, consisting of the 1st, 2nd and 3rd Battalions, elements of the 39th Infantry Division (United States). The 1st and 2nd Battalions were "composite" units with one battery equipped with the M101 howitzer and one battery equipped with the M114 howitzer. The 3rd Battalion was designated as a Rocket Howitzer Battalion, with one battery equipped with the MGR-1 Honest John rocket, and one battery equipped with the towed, 8 inch M115 howitzer. During this period the battalions were composed of two batteries each.

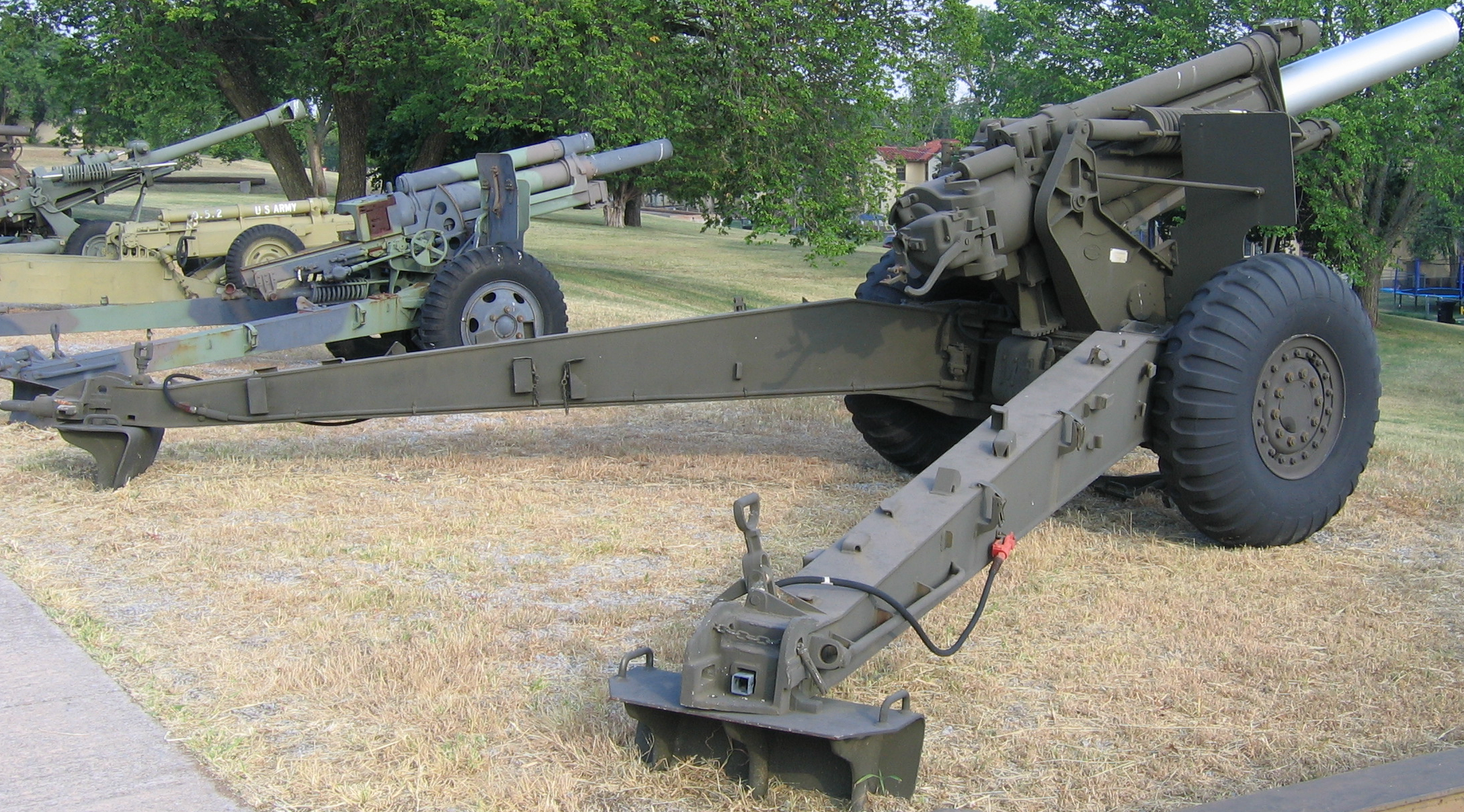
155 mm Howitzer M-114 at the U.S. Army Field Artillery Museum, Ft. Sill, Oklahoma

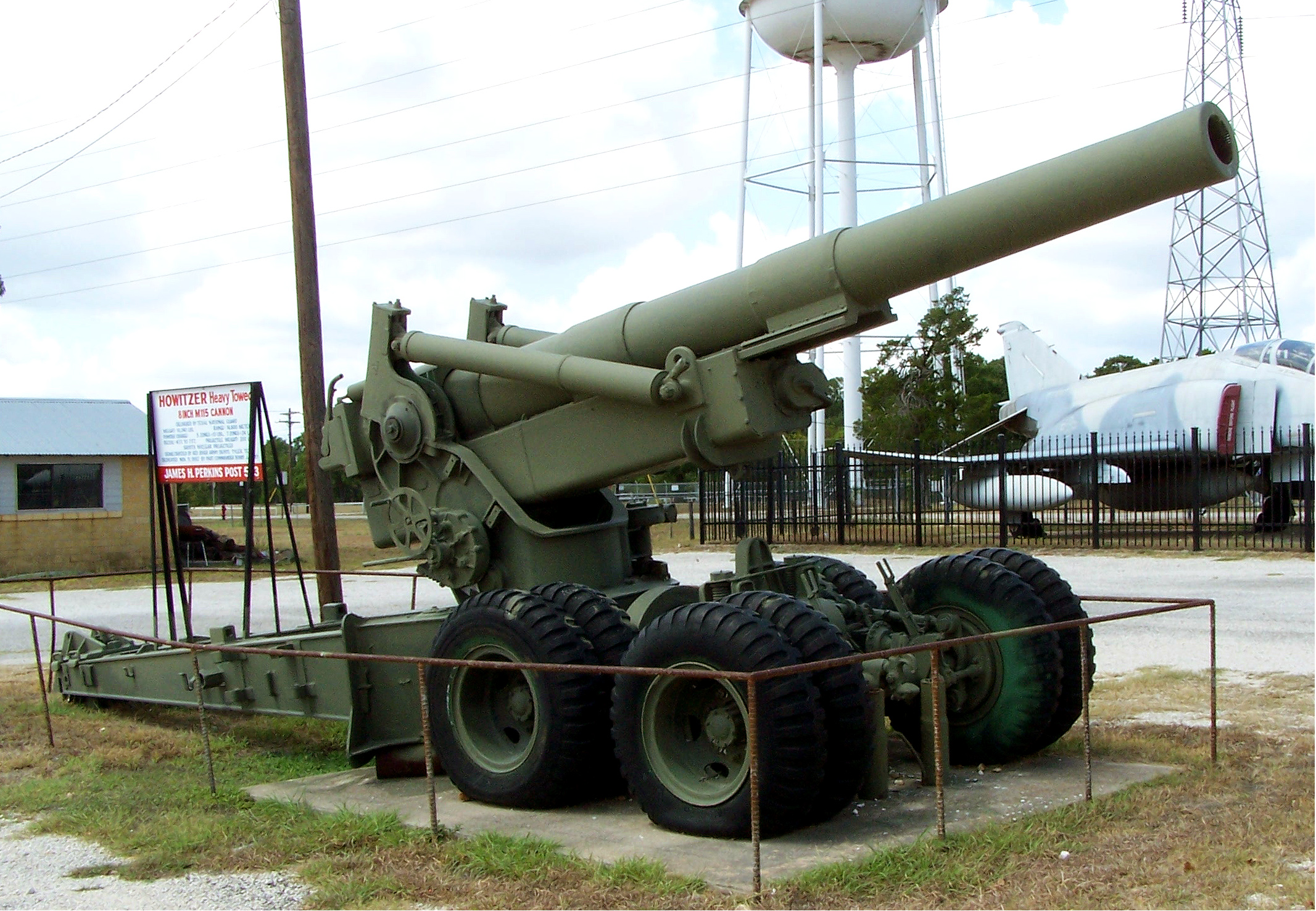
A M-115 203 mm howitzer on display at Bastrop, Texas, United States

Headquarters	Battery	Station
39th Division Artillery (DIVARTY)	Headquarters and Headquarters Battery	Little Rock
1st Howitzer Battalion (105mm/155mm)(Towed)	Headquarters and Headquarters Battery	Pine Bluff
	Battery A, (105mm)	Sheridan
	Battery B, (155mm)	Dumas
2nd Howitzer Battalion (105mm/155mm)(Towed)	Headquarters and Headquarters Battery	Hazen
	Battery A, (105mm)	Stuttgart
	Battery B, (155mm)	Brinkley
3rd Rocket Howitzer Battalion (Honest John/8 in)	Headquarters and Headquarters Battery	Marianna
	Battery A, (8 in)(Towed)	Helena
	Battery B, (Honest John)(SP)	West Helena

==== Stationing of 206th Artillery, 1963 ====
The 206th Artillery was reorganized 1 May 1963, when the 1st Battalion was inactivated. The remaining units of the regiment were the 2nd and 3rd Battalions, elements of the 39th Infantry Division.

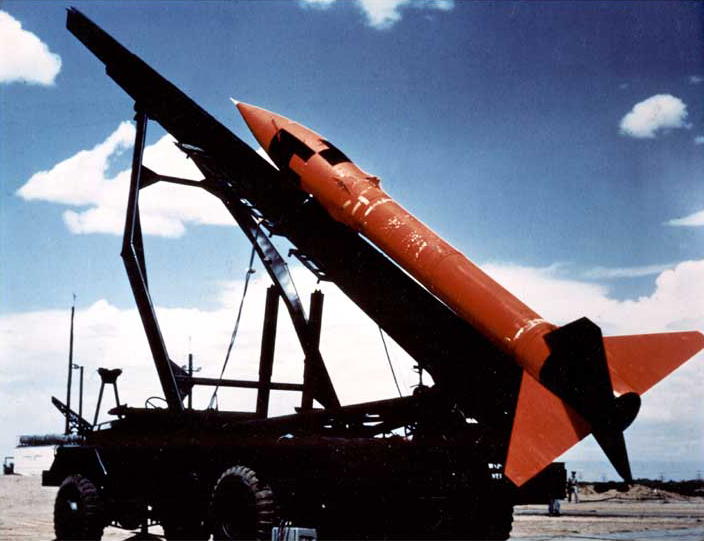
An "Honest John" rocket on truck.

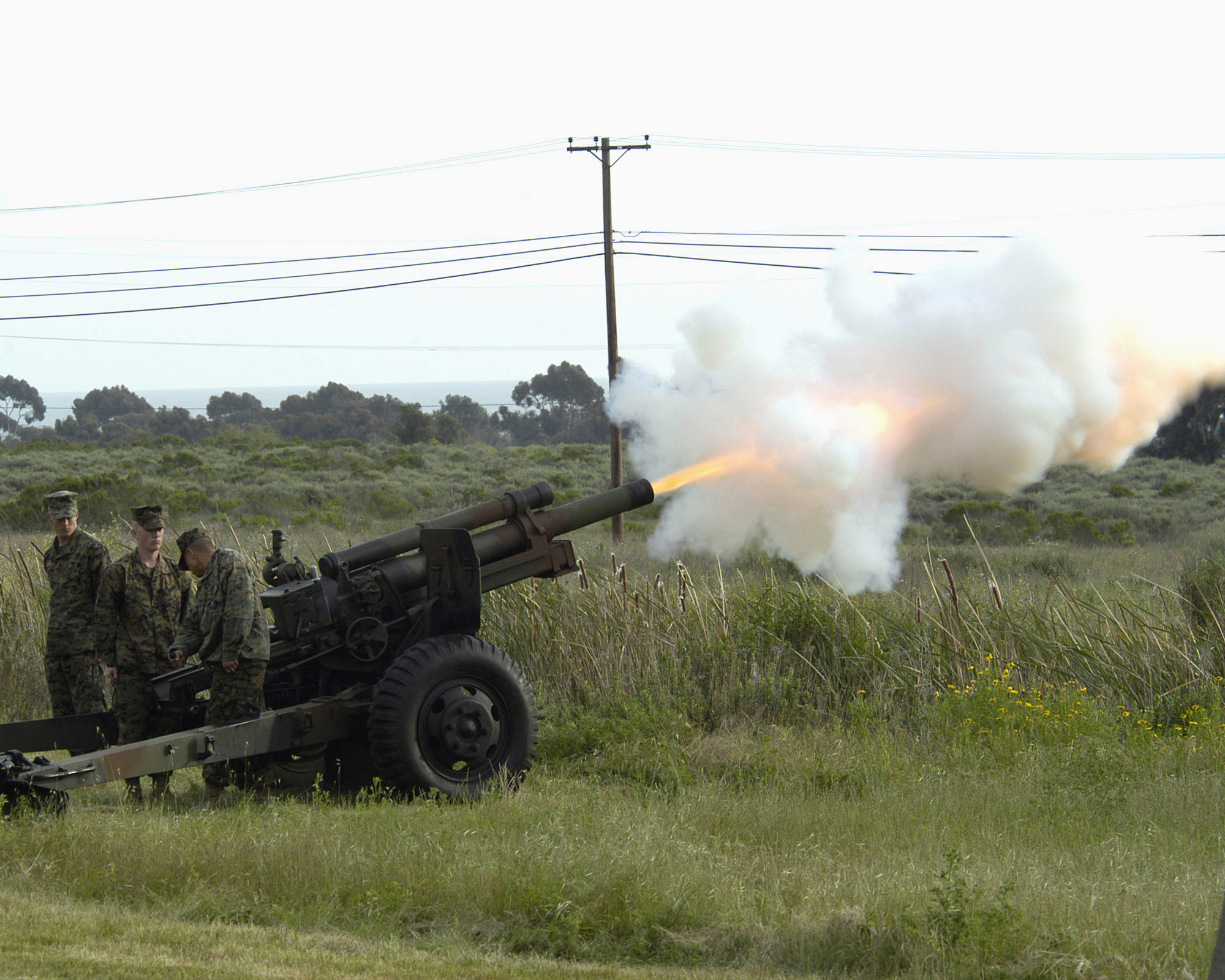
Marines from 11th Marines, 1st Marine Division fire an M101 105 mm Howitzer

Headquarters	Battery	Station
39th Division Artillery (DIVARTY)	Headquarters and Headquarters Battery	Little Rock
2nd Battalion (105mm)(Towed)	Headquarters and Headquarters Battery	Hazen
	Battery A, (105T)	Augusta
	Battery B, (105T)	Brinkley
	Battery C, (105T)	West Helena
3rd Battalion (Honest John)	Headquarters and Headquarters Battery	Marianna
	Battery A, (Honest John)	Helena

==== Reorganization as separate brigade ====
1 December 1967 the 39th Division was reorganized to become the 39th Infantry Brigade (Separate). The 2nd Battalion and 3rd Battalion, 206th Artillery were consolidated with the 5th Battalion, 142nd Field Artillery (organized and Federally recognized 22 June 1955 with headquarters at West Memphis) to form the 5th Battalion, 206th Artillery, with headquarters in West Memphis, Arkansas, an element of the 39th Infantry Brigade. This connection to the 5th Battalion, 142nd Field Artillery is not listed in the unit's Lineage and Honors certificate, but the units of the newly created 5–206th FA were stationed in the same cities as the units of the former 5–142nd FA, with the exception of the addition of the Service Battery which was moved to Marianna, Arkansas.

Old Unit	Station	New Unit
Headquarters and Headquarters Battery, 5–142nd FA	West Memphis	Headquarters and Headquarters Battery, 5–206th FA
Battery A, 5–142nd FA	Wynne	Battery A, 5–206th FA
Battery B, 5–142nd	Forrest City	Battery B, 5–206th FA
Battery C, 5–142nd	Harrisburg	Battery C, 5–206th FA
Headquarters and Headquarters Battery, 3–206th FA	Marianna	Service Battery, 5–206th FA.

In the late 1980s Service Battery, 5–206th FA was combined with the Headquarters and Headquarters Battery at West Memphis to form Headquarters and Headquarters Service Battery (HHSB). Troop E, 151st Cavalry Regiment was moved to Marriana. In 1993, Detachment 1 (Fire Support), HHSB was created on Camp Robinson to provide for the consolidation of all fire support elements from the 39th Brigade into one armory for training.

==== Restationing of 1996 ====
The 5th Battalion, 206th Field Artillery was consolidated with the 217th Maintenance Battalion and the 1st Battalion, 233rd Air Defense Artillery on 30 September 1996 and the consolidated unit was designated as the 1st Battalion, 206th Field Artillery with headquarters in Russellville, Arkansas.

Old Unit	Station	New Unit
Headquarters and Headquarters Detachment, 217th Maintenance Battalion, and Headquarters and Headquarters Service Battery, 5th Battalion, 206th Field Artillery	Russellville	Headquarters and Headquarters Service Battery, 1st Battalion, 206th Field Artillery
Detachment 1, HHSB, 5–206th FA	Camp Robinson, North Little Rock	Detachment 1 HHSB, 1–206th FA
Battery A, 1–233rd ADA	Morrilton	Battery A, 1–206th FA
Battery B, 1–233rd ADA	Paris	Battery B, 1–206th FA
Battery C, 1–233rd ADA	Dardanelle	Battery C, 1–206th FA

=== Global War on Terrorism ===
==== OIF II ====
===== Alert, train, deploy =====
The 1–206th FA received an alert for mobilization in support of Operation Iraqi Freedom on 28 July 2003. The 1–206th was inducted into federal service 12 October 2003, at home stations. The battalion learned that it would be deployed along with the rest of the 39th Infantry Brigade Combat Team (United States), as an element of the 1st Cavalry Division (United States). At this time the 1st Battalion adopted the nickname "Aleutian" as the unit's fixed call sign. The unit underwent training at Fort Hood, Texas for three months of intensive training in Force Protection, Convoy Security, Route Clearance and Urban Operations. The 1–206th FA became the first Army unit to field and conduct artillery live fire exercises with the new ANGYK-57 Advanced Field Artillery Tactical Data System (AFATDS). Each battery conducted two days of artillery live fire training during post mobilization training. At this time the 1–206th FA received the attachment of Battery A, 1st Battalion, 103rd Field Artillery, Rhode Island National Guard. The 1–206th FA had arrived at mobilization station approximately 80 soldiers short of its required strength, most vacancies being in the Fire Support Teams. The National Guard Bureau supplied this shortage by activating A/1-103rd and attaching it to 1–206th for deployment. A/1-103rd FA quickly became known as the "Rhody" Battery. While the 1–206th was at Fort Hood, the battalion commander, battalion operations officer, and three battery commanders accompanied the brigade staff and other battalion commanders and staff on a Pre-Deployment Site Survey (PDSS) to Iraq. The commanders spent 10 days traveling to the Baghdad Area of Operations, being hosted by the 16th Engineer Battalion, 1st Brigade, 1st Armored Division. In late January 2004 the 1–206th FA moved to the Joint Readiness Training Center (JRTC) at Fort Polk, Louisiana for a Mission Rehearsal Exercise to validate the brigade training for the deployment. While at Fort Polk the 39th Brigade staff was informed by the 1st Cavalry Division that due to a scheduling gap and the need to assume responsibility of the base defense operations center at Camp Taji, Iraq, the brigade would have to deploy one battalion approximately three weeks ahead of the rest of the brigade. The 39th Brigade selected the 1–206th to assume this mission and the battalion was prioritized on the brigade's movement plan. The advance party of the 1–206th FA departed Fort Polk on 28 February 2004. Due to a mechanical breakdown en route the advanced party arrived in Kuwait on 8 March 2004. By this time the 1–206th had been officially designated as the division main effort, with orders to conduct pre-combat checks and rehearsals and move to Camp Taji, Iraq via ground convoy as quickly as possible.

===== Operation Dutch Harbor =====
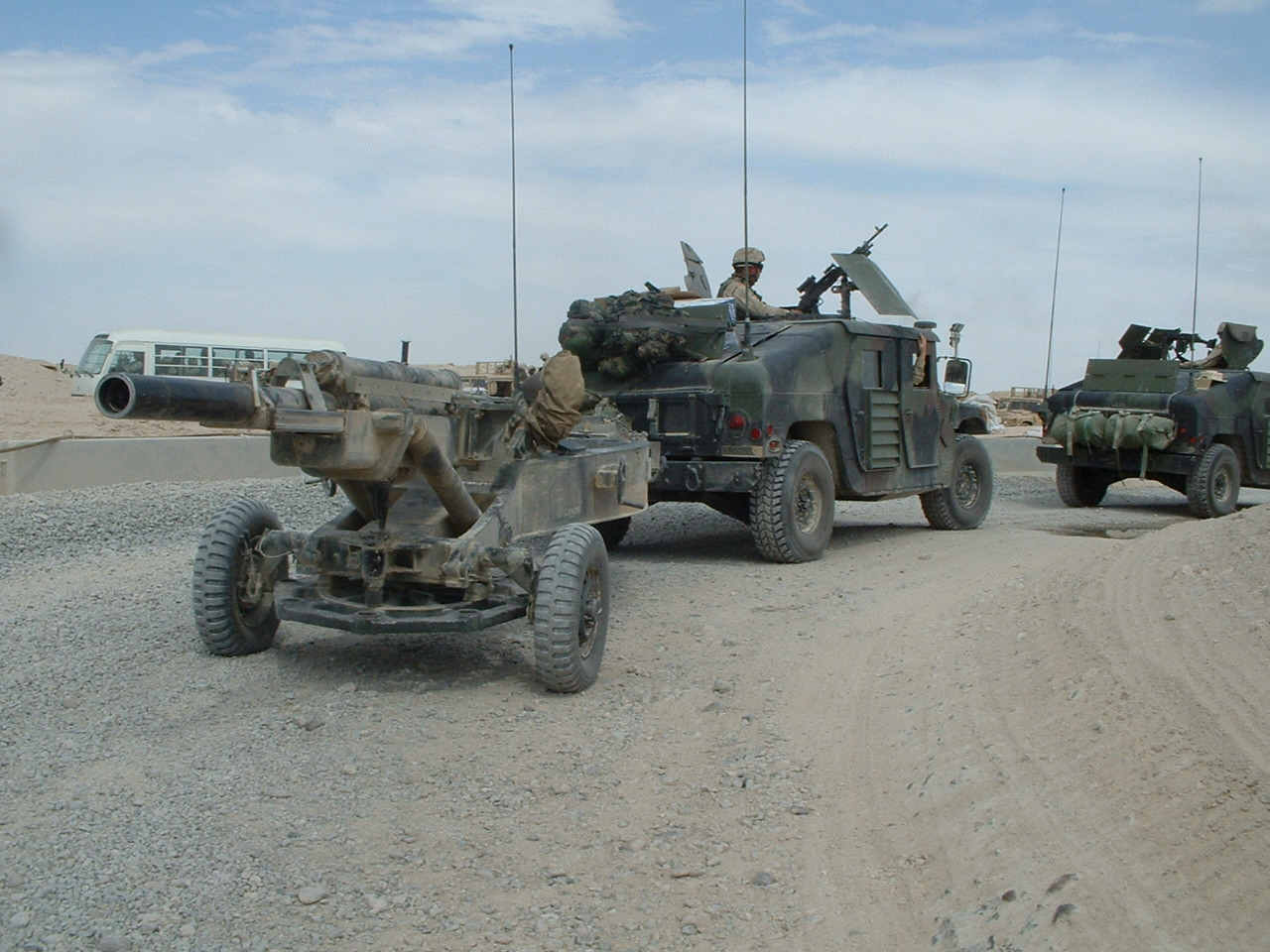
M102 howitzer belonging to Battery A, 1–206th FA, is towed north from Camp New York, Kuwait by a M1114 Up-Armored HMMWV.

The 1–206th FA conducted the 300 mile road march from Camp New York, Kuwait to Camp Taji, Iraq 15–17 March 2004, moving over 150 vehicles and over 450 soldiers with no serious incidents or injuries. The battalion was the first element of the 39th Brigade and the 1st Cavalry Division main body, to enter Iraq. The battalion named its base operations order for the defense of Camp Taji and field artillery support to the 39th IBCT, Operation Dutch Harbor in deference to the regiment's World War II heritage. Upon arriving at Camp Taji, the battalion learned that the force which they were to relieve was substantially larger than originally believed. The 1st Armor Division had actually directed the 3rd Brigade, 1st Armored Division to relieve the Division Artillery (DIVARTY) of the 4th Infantry Division of responsibility for the security of Camp Taji on approximately 1 February 2004. 3rd Brigade, 1st Armor Division deployed the 4th Battalion, 1st Field Artillery, 70th Engineer Battalion and elements of the 1 Battalion, 64th Armor to Camp Taji. In addition to conducting base defense operations, 3rd BCT had actually assumed responsibility for patrolling a large area surrounding Camp Taji as well as escorting explosive ordnance disposal teams on route clearance missions.

The 1–206th FA relieved the 3rd BCT, 1st Armor Division on 24 March 2004 and conducted its first fire mission in combat on that afternoon. The battalion quick reaction force, composed of the Battalion Survey Section, the Brigade Combat Observation Laser Teams (COLT) and one platoon from Battery A, 1–206th FA assumed responsibilities for reacting to distress calls from convoys and escorting EOD teams operating along Main Supply Route (MSR) Tampa (Iraqi Highway 1) which ran north to south for 26 Kilometers through the battalion's area of operations.

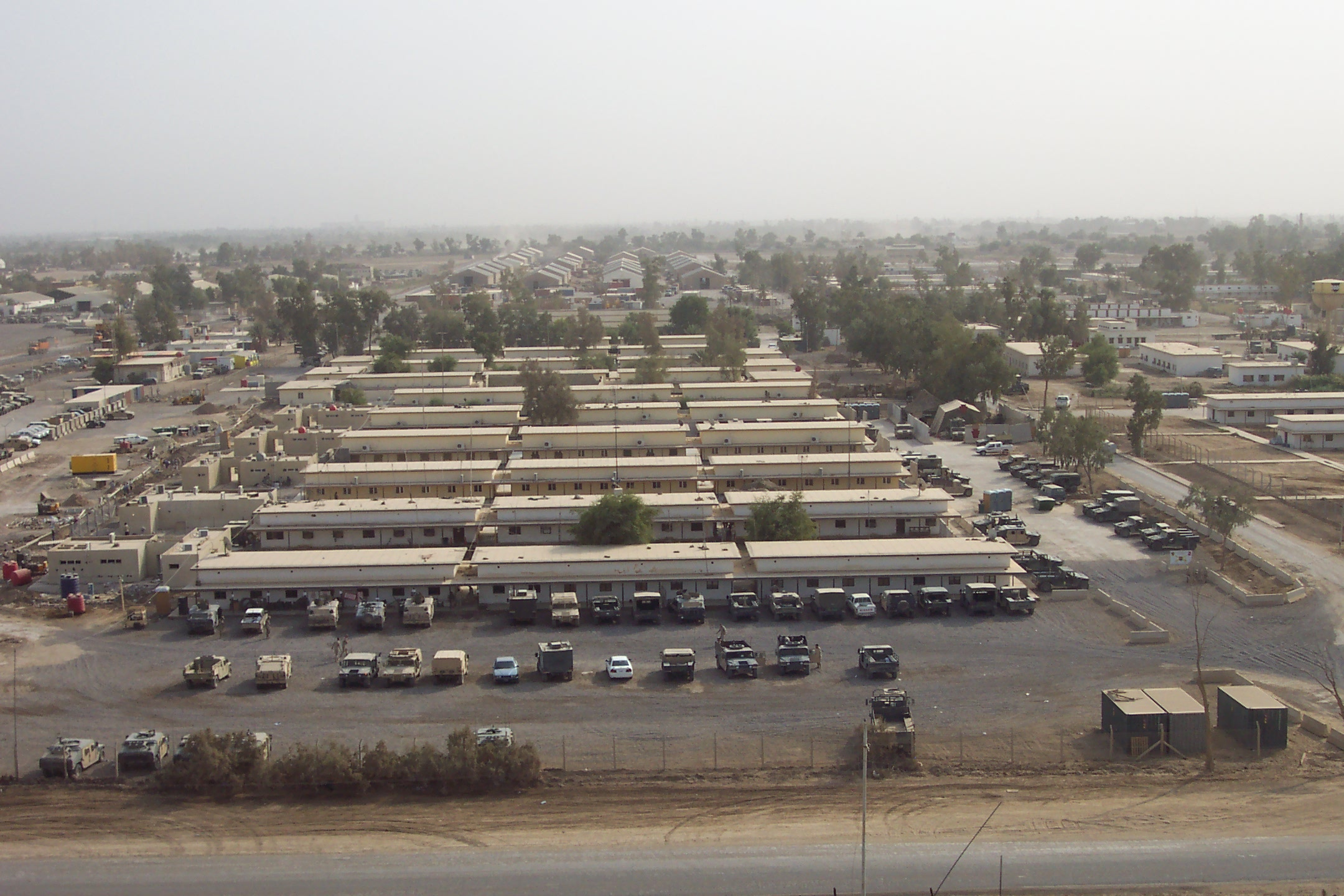
1–206th Field Artillery Tactical Operations Center and battery orderly rooms, Camp Taji Iraq, 2005.

The first combat operation of the war for the 39th BCT occurred on 3 April 2004, when the 1–206th Tactical Operations Center (TOC) received a request for support from 1st Battalion, 25th (Attack) Aviation Regiment. An OH-58 from the 1–25th AVN had identified and engaged an insurgent mortar team north of Camp Taji along a canal. The 1–206th dispatched its QRF team, led by the Targeting Warrant and the Battalion Operations Sergeant, and quickly captured one mortar team member, recovered the 60 mm mortar, one rocket propelled grenade (RPG) and several 60 mm mortar rounds. The team spent several hours searching the area for the second mortar team member. This search eventually turned into a joint operation, another first for the 39th BCT, with members of the 2nd Iraqi Army Battalion joining in a larger cordon and search operation of the surrounding houses. The captured 60mm mortar tube was utilized as a flag stand for the 1–206th Battalion colors for the remainder of the deployment. QRF teams conducted route clearance operations and escorted EOD teams to numerous IED sites until relieved of escort duty by elements of the 239th Engineer Company.

The battalion was originally scheduled to be relieved of responsibility for patrolling the area of operations around Camp Taji by the 2nd Squadron, 7th Cavalry Regiment (2–7 CAV) on 9 April 2004, but the relief had to be delayed until 12 April 2004 due to the fact that the Heavy Equipment Transport System (HETS) transporting the M2/M3 Bradley Fighting Vehicles belonging to 2–7 CAV were delayed in transit by attacks against the 39th IBCT main body convoys south of Baghdad. After the arrival of the 2–7 CAV and the remainder of the 39th BCT main body, 1–206th FA provided fires in support of 39th Brigade Combat Team operations; served as the base defense operations center (BDOC); manned the main entry control point, Gunner Gate; provided the camp's quick reaction force (QRF); conducted convoy and VIP escorts; and, trained, equipped and organized the 307th Iraqi National Guard Battalion. The battalion's AN/TPQ-36 Firefinder radar section was located at Camp Taji to provide early warning and detection of insurgent fires against the 1st Cavalry Division. The 1–206th was augmented with one AN/TPQ-37 Firefinder radar from C Battery (Target Acquisition) 1–21st FA, 1st Cavalry Division Artillery.

During this time the 1–206th FA made substantial improvements to the security of Camp Taji. Over six kilometers of triple standard concertina wire were installed along the camps perimeter, secure radio communications were established between the BDOC and all forty one guard towers along the perimeter, and living quarters were hardened with sandbags and concrete barriers. When it was discovered that insurgents had actually penetrated the perimeter to raid captured ammunition storage facilities on the camp, the battalion stationed its sniper team, known by call sign "Poacher", along the infiltration routes. The sniper teams destroyed one insurgent team attempting to enter the perimeter, and captured another.

The most significant attack on the perimeter of Camp Taji during the OIF II came on 5 June 2004 when two Vehicle Borne Improvised Explosive Devices (VBIED) exploded just outside Castle Gate. The VBIED struck during the morning rush hour, just after 0800. The two vehicles detonated within a few seconds of each other, one directed against workers attempting to enter Camp Taji through Castle Gate to work at various construction sites, and one directed at a group of Iraqi men who were waiting in line to apply for work at an Iraqi security firm across the street from Camp Taji. Eighteen Iraqis were killed in the attack and approximately forty were wounded. Amazingly no U.S. soldiers were killed in this attack. Quick reaction teams from the 1-206ht FA spent hours clearing the site, restoring the perimeter and directing traffic around the area.

===== Operation Aleutian Fury =====
In August 2004, 1–206th FA was notified by 39th BCT that 2–7 CAV was being detached from Multi National Division Baghdad (MND-B)to Multi National Division-South (MND-S) as part of the Battle of Najaf (2004) and 1st Battalion was ordered to assume responsibility for AO Ghost, the former 2–7 Area of Operations around Camp Taji. Task Force 1–206th FA received the attachment of the following units:

1st Platoon, Alpha Troop, 2–7 CAV;
B Company (-), 2-162 IN (Oregon National Guard);
1st Platoon, 239th Engineer Company;
D Company, 307th Iraqi Army Battalion (with assigned Military Assistance Training Team from 2–7 CAV);
a Civil Affairs Team; and,
Macedonian Special Forces Platoon located at Camp Taji.

Operation Aleutian Fury began at 1600 on 9 August 2004 and ended at 0900 on 17 September 2004 when the 1–206th FA was relieved by the 2–7 CAV returning from the Najaf Operation. The battalion was successful in reducing Improvised Explosive Device (IED) attacks against coalition convoys on MSR Tamp during this period of time. The key to this success was an aggressive campaign to search suspected cache sites along the major supply route utilizing the ability the motorized infantry from B/2-162 IN, the Macedonian Special Forces Platoon and the 307th Iraqi Army Battalion to enter areas previously inaccessible by the M3 Bradleys and M1A2 Abrams Main Battle Tanks of 2–7 CAV. During this time 1st Battalion, now known as Task Force Aleutian, suffered three casualties, all from attached units. SPC Brandon R Sapp, 1st Platoon, A Troop, 2–7 CAV was killed on 15 August 2004 when an IED exploded under the Bradley Fighting Vehicle that he was driving. SGT Benjamin W. Isenberg and SSG David J. Weisenburg, Company B, 2–162nd IN, died on 13 September 2004 when and IED exploded under their HMMWV north of Camp Taji.

===== Operation Aleutian Providence =====
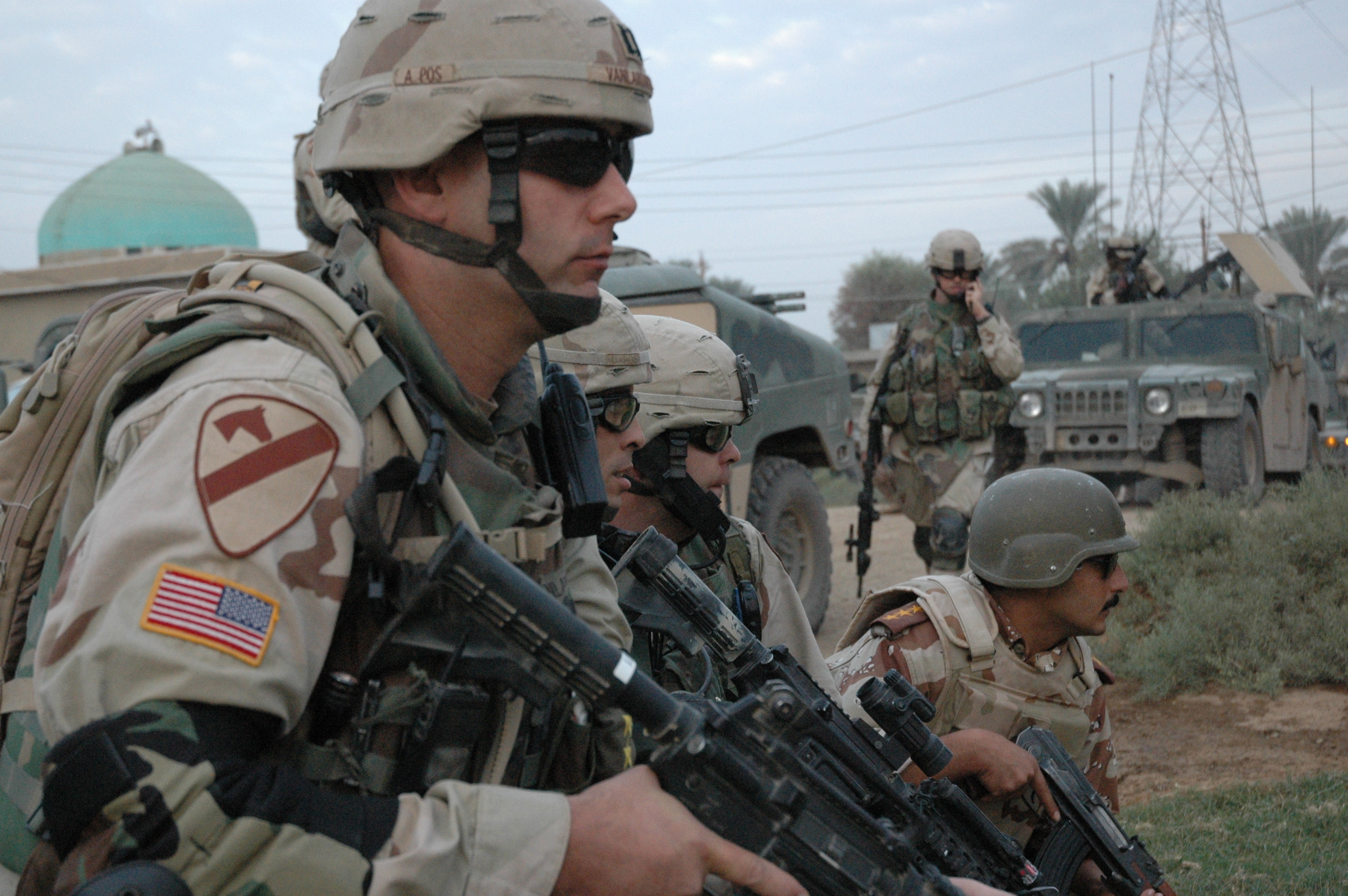
CPT John Vanlandingham, HHB, 1–206th Field Artillery; SSG Shaw Buffalo, HHC 39th BCT; 1LT Mark Bourgery, Battery A, 1–103rd FA; CPT Muhommad, S2, 307th ING Battalion; MAJ Christian Neary, Battery A, 1–103rd FA Operation Aleutian Providence, 5 October 04

After being relieved by 2–7 CAV, the 1–206th FA retained control of an area of operations south of Camp Taji. On 3 October 2004 the battalion suffered two additional casualties when SSG Christopher Potts (Battery A, 1–103rd FA) and SGT Russell "Doc" Collier were killed in a fire fight with insurgents near the village of Musurraf, south of Camp Taji along the Tigris River. SGT Collier was posthumously awarded the Silver Star for his actions when he moved forward under heavy enemy fire in order to render aid to SSG Potts who had been shot while attempting to silence an enemy automatic weapon. SSG Potts was posthumously awarded the Bronze Star Medal with V Device for his actions that day.

On 5 October 2004 the 1st Battalion launched Operation Aleutian Providence, the battalion's largest operation of the deployment to retake Musurraf village and capture individuals responsible for the ambush of SSG Potts and SGT Collier. The battalion was reinforced for this operation by one platoon of B/2-162 INF and the Macedonian Special Forces Platoon located at Camp Taji. The operation was conducted as a joint operation with the 307th Iraqi Army Battalion. The operation resulted in the discovery of a massive weapons cache and improvised explosive device manufacturing facility which was described as the largest uncovered in Multi-National Division Baghdad at that time.

===== Operation Aleutian Fury II =====
On approximately 1 November 2004 the 1–206th FA was ordered by 39th BCT to resume responsibility for AO Ghost, the area of operations assigned to 2–7 CAV due to that unit's impending tasking to take part in Operation Al-Fajr, Second Battle of Fallujah, Iraq. In order to conduct this Economy of Force Mission, 1st Battalion received the attachment of the following units from 2–7 CAV:

B Company (-) 2-162 IN (Oregon National Guard);
1st Platoon, 239th Engineer Company;
D Company 307th Iraqi Army Battalion with assigned Military Assistance Training Team from 2–7 CAV;
a Civil Affairs Team; and
the Macedonian Special Forces Platoon located at Camp Taji.

This was essentially the same task organization from Operation Aleutian Fury, with the major exception of the M3 Bradley Fighting Vehicles of 1st Platoon, A/2-7 CAV which were assigned elsewhere in the 39th BCT's area of operations in the northeastern part of Baghdad. The 1–206th experienced its most significant fighting of the deployment during this period. Insurgent forces escaping from the siege of Fallujah infiltrated into the city of Tarimayah, Iraq in the northeastern corner of AO Ghost. These displaced insurgents focused their efforts on interdicting Coalition supply convoys moving along MSR Tamp from Balad Air Base and Logistics Support Area Anaconda south to Baghdad and west to support the fighting around Fallujah. As the fighting ebbed and flowed during this period, the 1–206th was additionally reinforced with:

two platoons from E Troop, 151 CAV;
one platoon from B Company, 3-153 IN; and,
Battery F, 1st Battalion, 202 Air Defense Artillery.

Route clearance operations from 1–206th encountered multiple complex ambushes along MSR Tampa during this period, especially in the area around Mushada, Iraq, in the northern part of AO Ghost. On 14 November 2004, a patrol of 307th Iraqi National Guard Soldiers with an adviser team from 1st Battalion, 206th Field Artillery led by CPT John Vanlandingham, and an escort platoon from B Company, 3-153 IN was ambushed north of Mushada. CPT Vanlandingham received the Silver Star medal for his actions to save several wounded Iraqi Army Soldiers who had become separated from the patrol during the ambush.

During this period, the sniper teams from 1–206th, call sign "Poachers", conducted a series of very successful engagements in coordination with the Macedonian Special Forces Platoon along MSR Tamp. On one occasion the team destroyed an eight-man insurgent team which was attempting to ambush the battalion quick reaction force from Battery C, 1–206th FA, just north of Camp Taji near a former missile factory known as the Nasser Factory. 1–206th FA was reinforced during one fight in this period by a section of M2 Bradleys belonging to the 1-69th Infantry, New York National Guard, which was deployed as part of the 256th Infantry Brigade Combat Team, Louisiana National Guard. A platoon from B/2-162 IN had four of its five vehicles disabled by a complex ambush in the city of Mushada. While this platoon was being refitted with M1114s requisitioned from the 39th BCT Commander, the BCT Deputy Commander and the BCT S3, the 1–206th asked for assistance from the 1–69th. The 1–69th supplied two M2 Bradleys to help clear this complex ambush site. This was notable because the 1–69th had just arrived at Camp Taji and the M2s were in the process of being downloaded from their Heavy Equipment Transport System (HETS) carriers at the time of the request. 1–69th eventually conducted a relief in place with 1–206th, assuming responsibility for a vast area of operations which stretched from just west of MSR Tamp westward to the boundary with the 1st Marine Expeditionary Forces, just east of Fallujah.

1–206th FA was relieved by the 2–7 CAV at the close of the Fallujah Campaign on 28 November 2004. The 1–206th FA retained an area west of Camp Taji, in addition to an area south of Camp Taji as its area of operations in addition to conducting base defense, providing counter fire operations and convoy escorts.

===== Fire mission =====
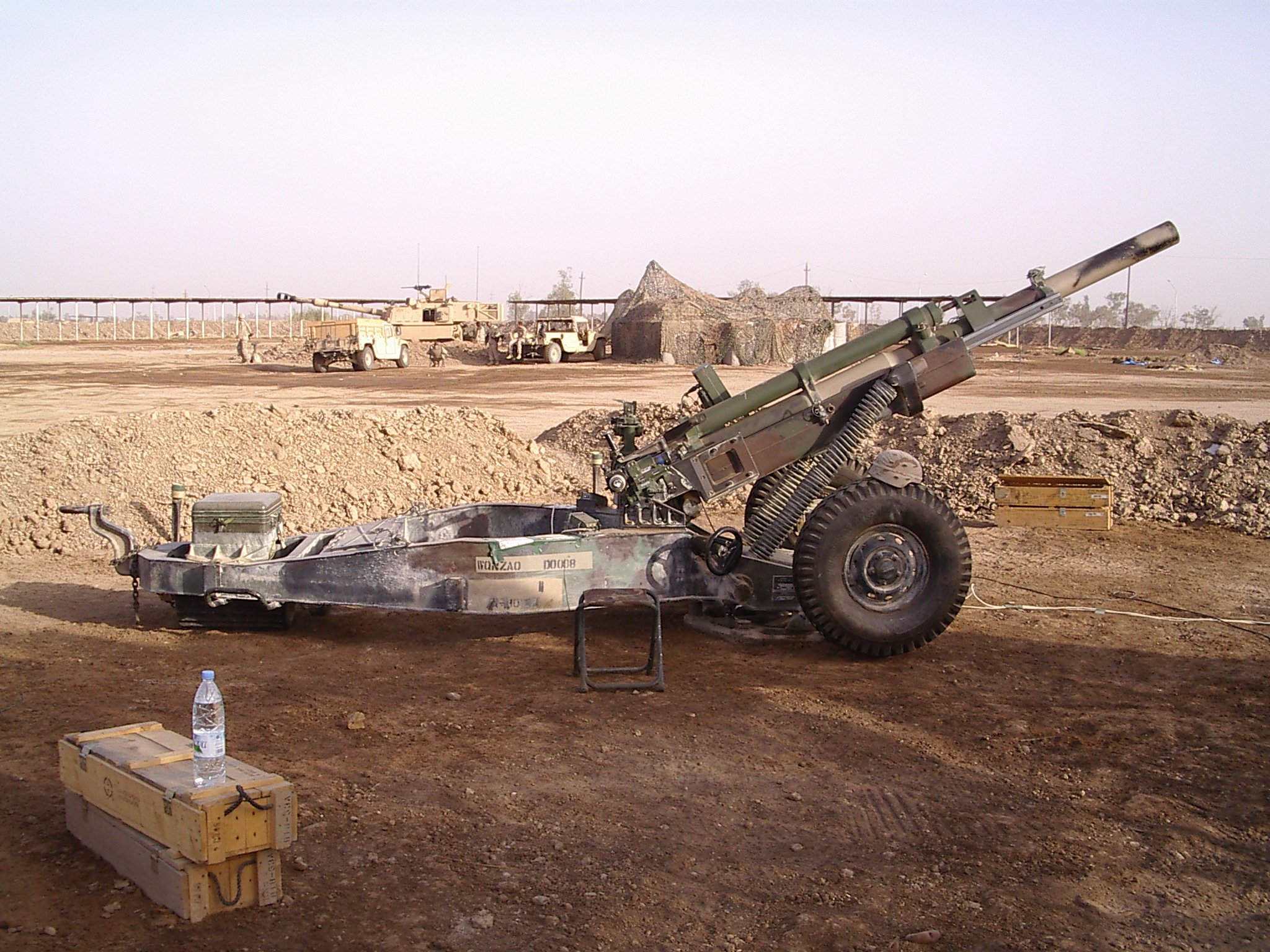
M102 Howitzer belonging to Battery A, 1st Battalion, 206th Field Artillery, 39th Brigade Combat Team, in position at Camp Taji, Iraq 29 May 2004

During OIF II, the 1–206th FA was equipped with the M102 howitzer, a Vietnam War era, 105mm, towed howitzer. The battalion fired over 1500 rounds in 154 fire missions in support of 39th BCT combat operations. The 1–206th FA was the only U.S. Army unit to deploy the M102 howitzer to Iraq. The battalion was also equipped with the M1114 "Up-Armored" HMMWV which were utilized for patrolling and convoy escorts. The 1–206th was reinforced by two M109A6 Paladin Howitzers from 2nd Battalion, 82nd Field Artillery, which assisted with counterfire missions beyond the range of the 1–206th FA's howitzers. The Paladin could range targets out to thirty kilometers from Camp Taji, while the M102 howitzers could only range targets to eleven kilometers.

Two key events in the life of the new Iraqi Republic occurred during the deployment of the 1–206th FA, the return to Iraqi sovereignty in accordance with United Nations Security Council Resolution 1546 on 28 June 2004, and the first Iraqi National Elections on 30 January 2005. The 39th BCT was instrumental in the January 2005 elections. The battalion was responsible for working with the 307th ING Battalion to establish and secure six different polling sites within the battalion's area of operations. In order to avoid jeopardizing the credibility of the election process, it was necessary to avoid a United States Military presence at the polling sites. This meant that the security at the polling sites would be the responsibility of 307th ING Battalion alone. Battalion leaders spent countless hours planning and coordination with Iraqi counterparts and governmental elections officials. The task at one polling site was even more complicated. Over 3000 Iraqi army soldiers living on the Iraqi side of Camp Taji wished to vote, but in order to prevent a perception of military control of the ballot box, it was determined that these soldiers would have to vote outside the camp at the village of Assyria, and they would be unarmed. This obviously presented a very lucrative target for insurgents.

The test of all the preparations came at 1000 hrs on election day. Iraqi citizens were standing in one line and Iraqi army soldiers in another when two 107mm rockets burst in the air over the polling site. The 155mm Paladins reinforcing the 1–206th instantly replied with counter battery fire against the insurgent rocket launch sites, while leaders rushed to the polling site fearing the worse. What they found were Iraqi citizens and soldiers doggedly standing in line, refusing to be driven away. At the close of voting not one site in the 1–206th area of operations was disrupted or forced to close. One battery of the 1–206th was detached to support the voting in Baghdad during this time. On approximately 23 January 2005, 1–206th FA received orders to detach Battery A, to 2nd Battalion, 162nd Infantry, in order to secure key bridges and routes to ensure that citizens could reach the polling sites, but the primary threat, vehicle born improvise explosive devices (VBIED) could not. Battery A reverted to battalion control on 31 January 2009.

===== Relief in place =====
The 1–206th FA transferred responsibility for Base Defense Operations at Camp Taji, Iraq and the surrounding battle space to 4th Battalion, 1st Field Artillery, an element of 3rd BCT, 1AD, assigned to 3rd Infantry Division (United States) on 5 March 2005 4-1 FA and the 3rd BCT/1AD are the same organizations that the 1–206th FA relieved in March 2004. 3rd BCT/1AD had only 10 months at home between deployments in support of OIF I and OIF III.

The 1–206th FA departed Camp Taji 4 March through 10 March en route to Camp Doha Kuwait via air and ground convoy. The main body departed Kuwait on 16 March 2005 and redeployed to Fort Sill, OK, for demobilization.

==== Operation Iraqi Freedom 07-08 ====
===== Alert, train, deploy, again =====
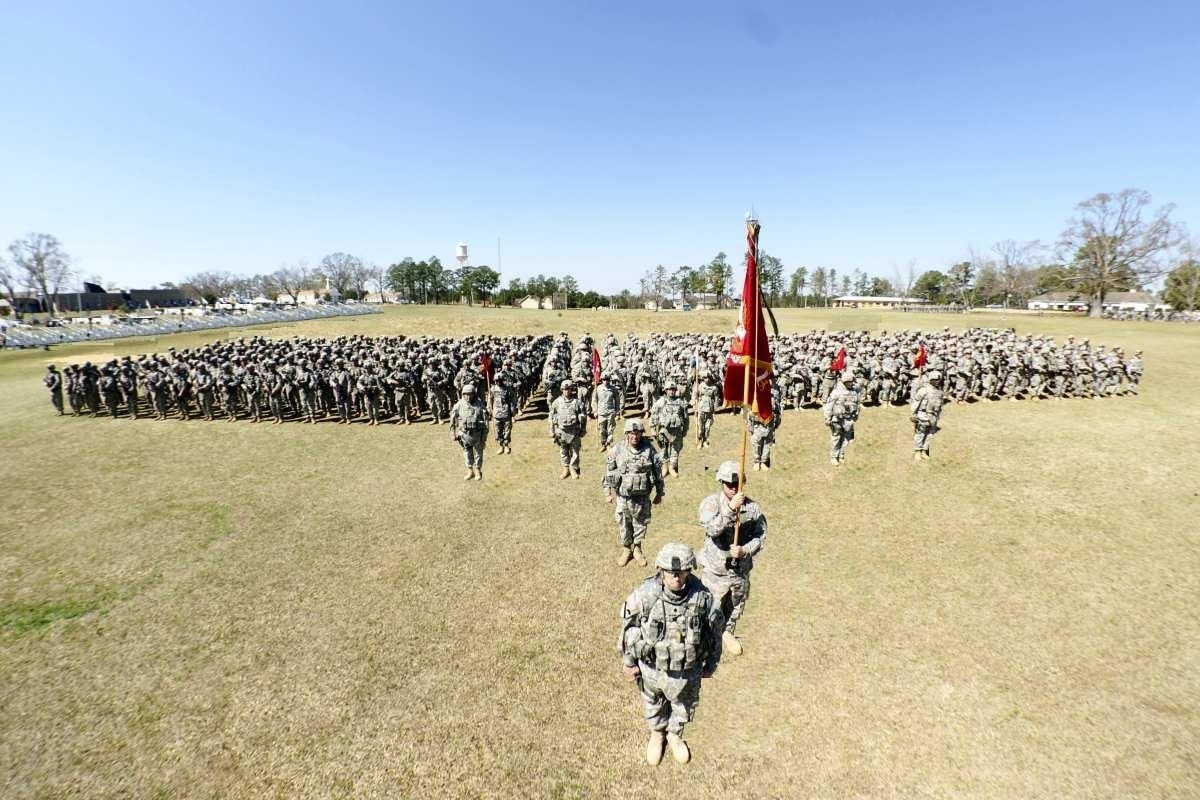
1st Battalion, 206th Field Artillery, 39th Brigade Combat Team, on parade, Camp Shelby Mississippi March 2008

The 1–206th Battalion received an alert for a second deployment in support of Operation Iraqi Freedom in April 2007. The battalion began a 90-day pre-mobilization training period on Title 32 Active Duty within the State of Arkansas on 1 October 2007. The battalion mobilized at home stations and began movement to Camp Shelby, Mississippi for post mobilization training on 2 January 2008. The battalion was designated as a security forces battalion with 697 soldiers task organized as follows:

===== Task organization =====
Headquarters and Headquarters Battery was designated as a 42-man Rear Area Operations Center and assigned to the 4th Infantry Division to provide the Garrison Command Staff for Camp Taji, Iraq

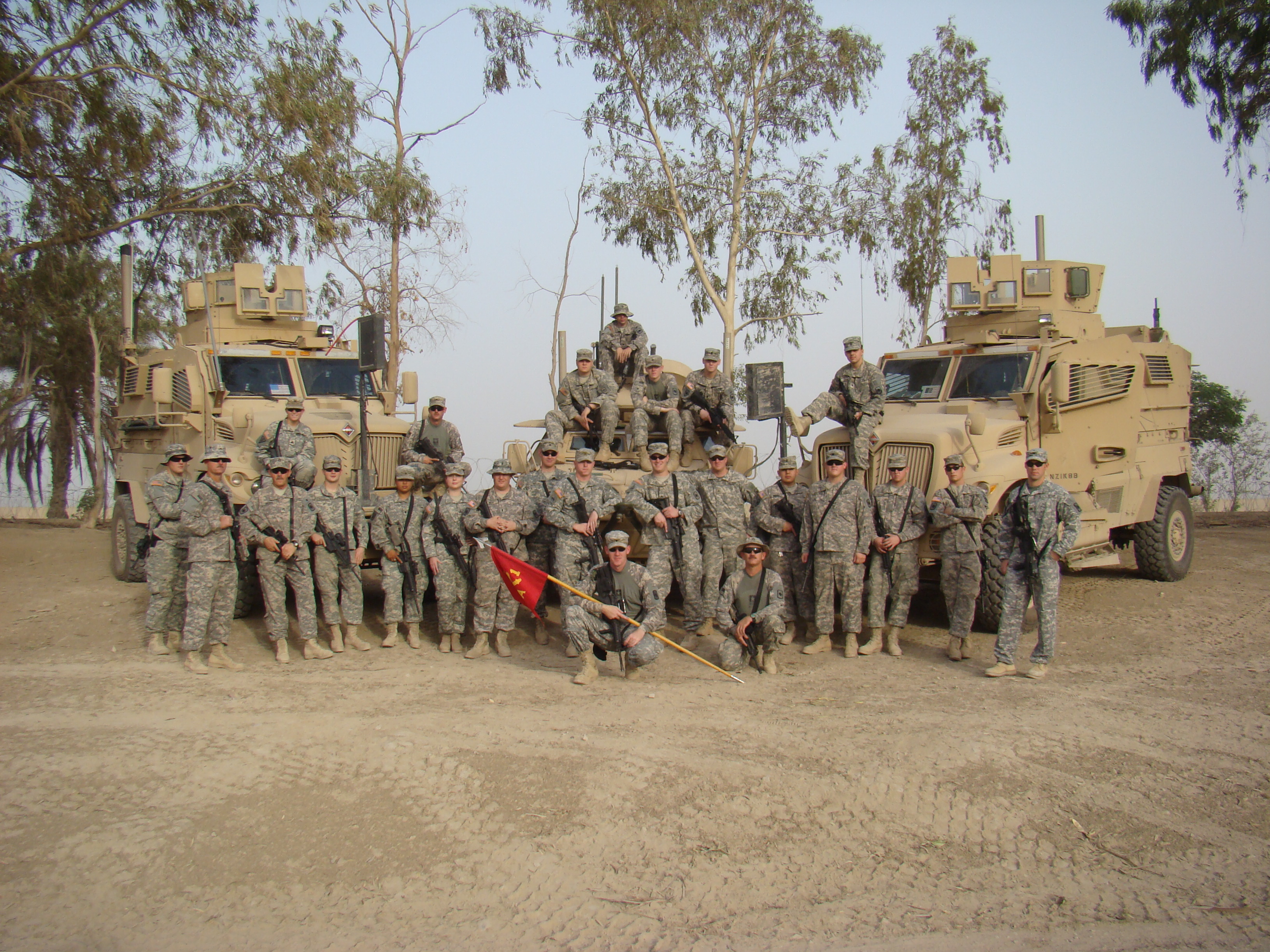
Members of 1st Platoon, Battery A, 1–206th FA at Camp Liberty with their MRAP vehicles

Battery A, 1–206th FA was organized as a convoy security company, with 131 soldiers and was subsequently assigned to convoy security duty at Camp Liberty, Iraq, in support of the 168th Brigade Support Battalion, and element of the 1st Sustainment Brigade, 3rd Expeditionary Sustainment Command. The battery received the attachment of two Regular Army platoons, bringing the strength the unit to 175 soldiers during the deployment. Battery A safely executed over 700 combat logistic patrols totaling more than 575,000 miles throughout the MND-B Area of Operations. Seven soldiers from Battery A were awarded the Bronze Star Medal. Battery A soldiers also received three impact Army Commendation Medals, two Combat Action Badges, and several Army Achievement Medals and Drivers badges.

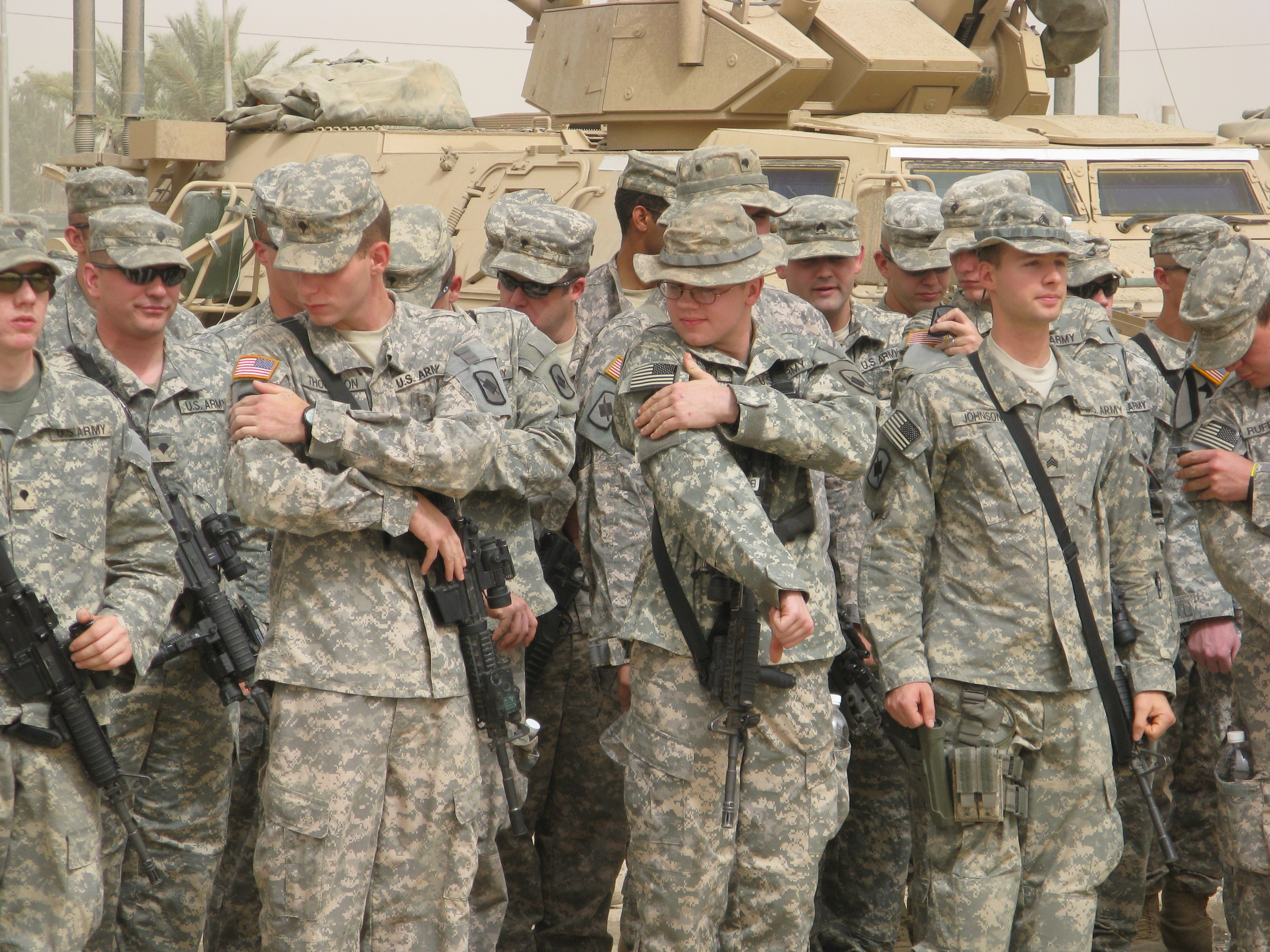
Members of Battery B, 1–206th FA place the 39th Brigade Combat Patch on their right shoulder during a combat patch ceremony at Camp Taji, Iraq, 3 June 2008

Battery B, 1–206th FA was organized as a convoy security company, with 131 soldiers and was subsequently assigned to convoy security duty at Camp Taji Iraq, in support of the 165th Corps Sustainment Support Battalion, from the Louisiana National Guard, an element of the 1st Sustainment Brigade, 3rd Expeditionary Sustainment Command. Battery B received the attachment of one regular army platoon, bringing its deployed strength to 147 soldiers. The battery was responsible for sixty three assorted gun trucks and completed over 600 combat logistics patrols.

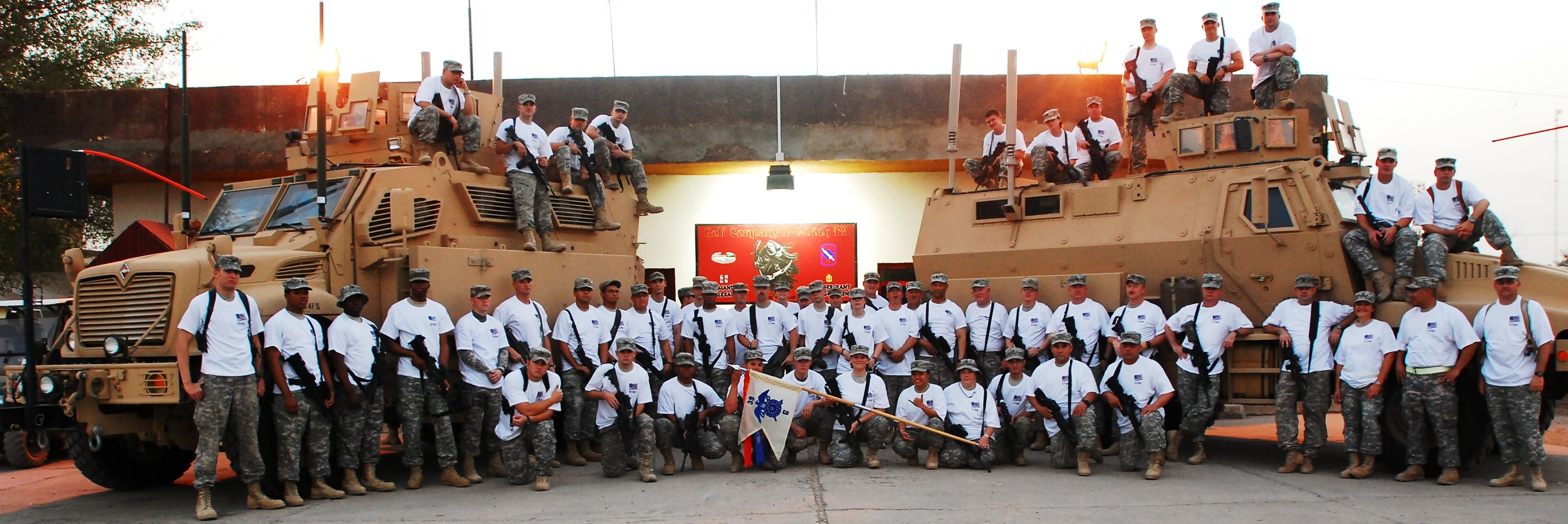
Member of Company G, 39th Brigade Support Battalion model T-shirts made for them by a member of the Family Readiness Group, June 2008, Camp Taji, Iraq, in front of their MRAP vehicles

Company G, 39th BSB, the battalion's forward support company, was organized as a convoy security company, with 131 soldiers and was subsequently assigned to Convoy Security Duty at Camp Taji Iraq, in support of the 165th Corps Sustainment Support Battalion, from the Louisiana National Guard, an element of the 1st Sustainment Brigade, 3rd Expeditionary Sustainment Command. Company G was assigned seventy eight gun trucks during the deployment and completed over 112 combat missions that consisted of over 210,000 accident free miles. Convoy security elements from Company G traveled as far north as Mosul, in northern Iraq, and made repeated runs to Kuwait. The company was recognized for inventing the first rolling RETRANS system, a radio relay system, which allowed combat logistics patrols to communicate at nearly triple the normal distance.

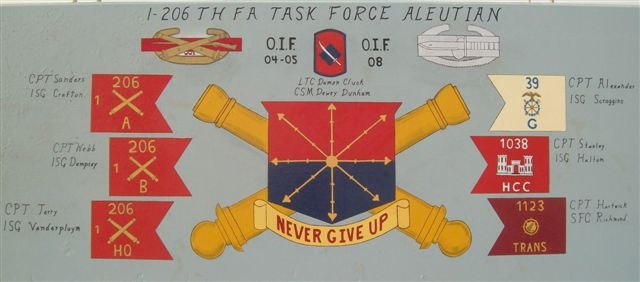
A Concrete Barrier at Camp Buerhing, Kuwait painted with the units that made up Task Force Aleutian during OIF 08-09

The 1–206th FA also received the attachment of the 1123rd Transportation Company, of the 871st Troop Command for the deployment. The 1123rd was organized as a force protection company with 131 soldiers and was subsequently assigned to the 1–152 Cavalry Squadron, an element of the 1st Sustainment Brigade, 3rd Expeditionary Sustainment Command, in order to asst with base defense operations at Camp Taji, Iraq.

Finally the 1–206th FA also received the attachment of the 1038th Horizontal Construction Company, of the 875th Engineer Battalion. The 1038th was organized as a force protection company with 131 soldiers and was subsequently assigned to the 1–152 Cavalry Squadron, an element of the 1st Sustainment Brigade, 3rd Expeditionary Sustainment Command, in order to asst with base defense operations at Camp Taji, Iraq.

===== Sadr City =====
The most significant combat actions of the second deployment of the 1–206th to Iraq occurred when Batteries A and B and Company G were tasked to escort convoys of concrete barriers to Baghdad during the Siege of Sadr City. The "Clear, Hold, Build Concept" as it was employed in Sadr City involved cordoning several city blocks by emplacing twelve to fourteen foot tall concrete barriers around the area to be sealed off. These barriers weighed several tons each, so an entire convoy might move only thirty to forty barriers. The convoy escort team would escort the civilian trucks hauling the barriers from Camp Taji or Camp Liberty to Sadr City, and then provide security on the site for up to six hours while cranes lifted and emplaced each barrier. These missions often came under small arms fire and the threat of improvised explosive devices was constant. The units of the 1–206th, while attached to the 1st Sustainment Brigade, emplaced hundreds of barriers as part of the effort to pacify this volatile area of Baghdad.

The 1–206th FA suffered no killed in action during this second deployment, although Battery B had one killed in action from an attached Regular Army unit. SGT Jose Ulloa, of 515th Transportation Company was killed on 8 August 2008 when the LMTV that he was riding in was struck by an improvised explosive device during a convoy security mission in Sadr City, Baghdad. SGT Ulloa's platoon was attached to Battery B as a convoy security platoon at the time of his death.

===== Homecoming =====
The battalion demobilized at Camp Shelby, Mississippi, 23 December 2008.

== Significant non-combat deployments ==
In May 1927 the 206th Coast Artillery's Captain Harry Smith was commended by the Little Rock Chamber of Commerce for breaking up a mob that had rioted after the Ku Klux Klan staged lynching in the city.

The 206th Coast Artillery was called to state active duty to support the citizens of eastern Arkansas during the Arkansas River floods of 1927 and 1937. The regiment was responsible for setting up to refugee camps and providing relief to thousands of survivors. Colonel Robertson directed the 1927 relief operations in the Marianna area from the towboat St. Augustine.

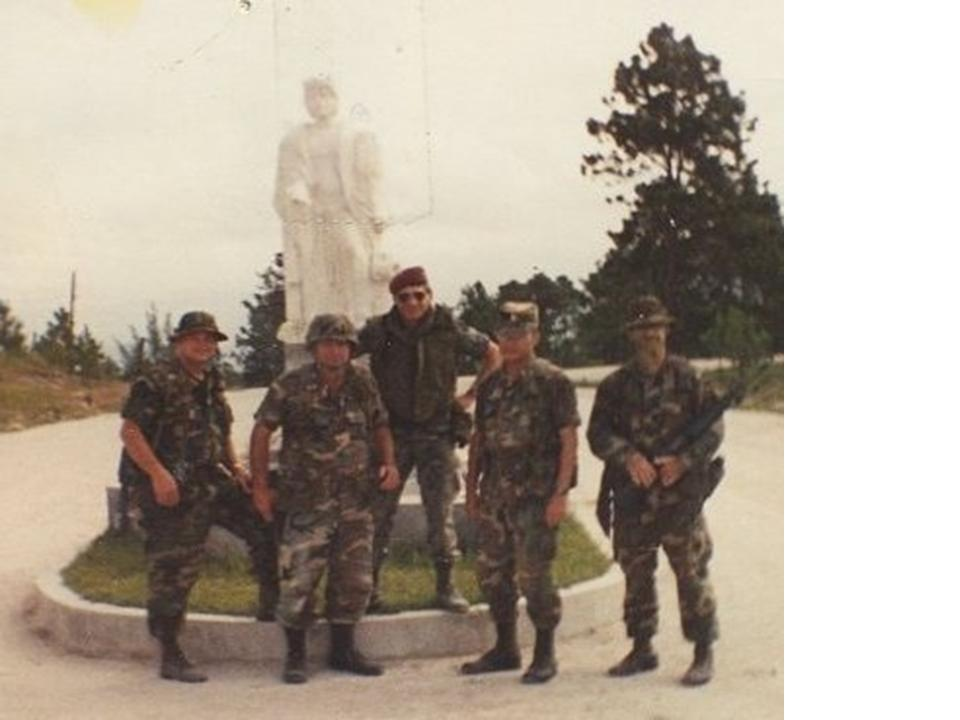
Battalion Staff of the 5th Battalion, 206th Field Artillery in front of a statute of St. Barbara at the Honduran Artillery School, Zambrano, Honduras, June 1990. From Right to Left, 1LT Al Parsons; MAJ John Brackin, Battalion S3; MAJ Herb Lawrence, Battalion XO; CPT John Brady, Battalion S2, CW4 James S. Keeton, Target Acquisition Warrant Officer

The 437th Field Artillery Battalion and the 445th Field Artillery Battalion were ordered into active federal service 24 September 1957 at home stations, in support of the Little Rock Central High School Integration Crisis in Little Rock Arkansas; The 437th Field Artillery Battalion was released 22–24 October 1957 from active Federal service and reverted to state control while the 445th Field Artillery Battalion was released 23 October 1957 from active Federal service and reverted to state control.

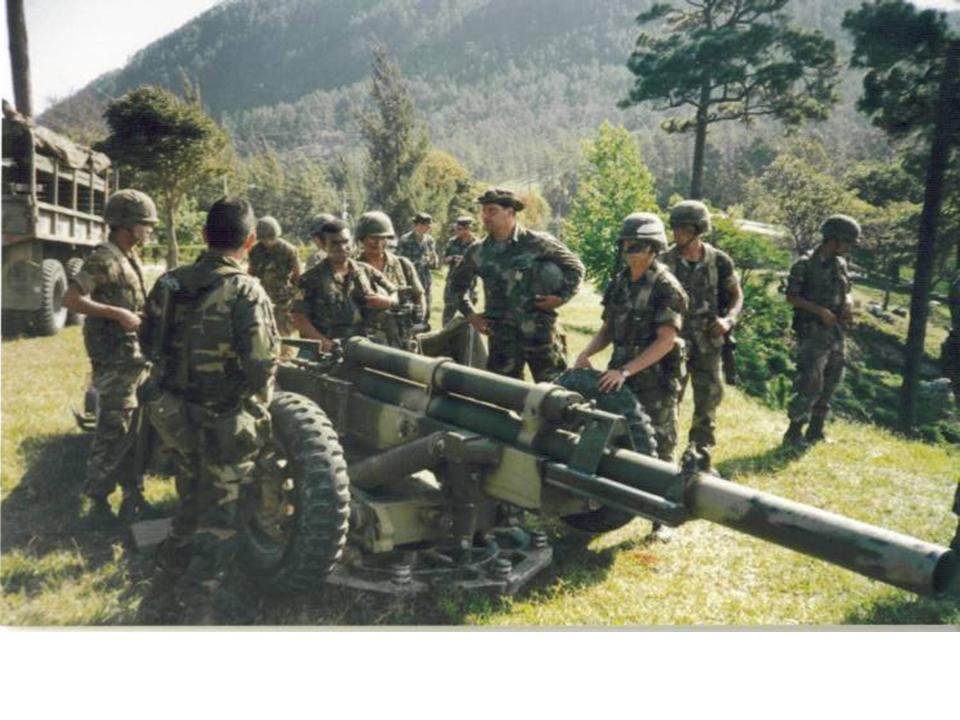
Member of Battery B, 5th Battalion, 206th Field Artillery train with a Honduran Army artillery section in June 1990

The 5th Battalion, 206th FA was deployed to the Republic of Honduras in the summer of 1988 and again in the summer of 1990 in order to provide training with the Honduran Army. This was part of a larger deployment of National Guard troops into the region in order to help strengthen ties during a period of Marxist activity in Central America.

In October 2001, the 1st Battalion deployed a seventy-man detachment of Battery C to secure the Arkansas Nuclear One power plant at Russellville, Arkansas in wake of the 11 September 2001 terrorist attacks. Members of the 206th were on duty at the site for approximately three months.

In September 2005, the 1st Battalion was activated in support of Operation Katrina to provide hurricane relief to the residents of Louisiana. Members of the 206th served in Louisiana until February 2006.

In December 2006, the 1st Battalion deployed a seventy-man detachment of Headquarters and Headquarters Battery for service on the south west border in support of Operation Jump Start, serving there until the 1st Battalion received its alert for mobilization in support of OIF 07–09.

Most recently the 1st Battalion activated a fifty-man County Recovery Team under state control in order to support Ice Storm Recovery Operations in Sharp County, Arkansas, 30 January 2009 to 6 February 2009.

== 206th Artillery fallen soldiers ==
=== Operation Iraqi Freedom II ===
- Staff Sergeant Christopher Potts, Battery A, 1–103rd Field Artillery, Killed in Action, Musurraf, Iraq, 3 October 2004
- Sergeant Russell Collier, Headquarters and Headquarters Service Battery, Killed in Action, Musurraf, Iraq, 3 October 2004

=== World War II ===
- Private Claude H. Biggs, Battery F, Killed in Action, Dutch Harbor, Alaska, 3 June 1942
- Private Allen C. Collier, Jr., HQ Battery, 2nd Battalion, Dutch Harbor, Alaska, Killed in Action, 3 June 1942
- Private James E. Harrington, Battery E, Killed in Action, Dutch Harbor, Alaska, 3 June 1942
- Private Hugh Bryan Timberlake, Battery B, Killed in Action, Dutch Harbor, Alaska, 3 June 1942
- Private James R. Wiles, Battery C, Killed in Action, Dutch Harbor, Alaska, 3 June 1942
- Private Charles W. Hill, Battery F, Killed in Action, Dutch Harbor, Alaska, 4 June 1942
- Private Ambrose D. Regalia, Battery F, Killed in Action, Dutch Harbor, Alaska, 4 June 1942

==== Killed in action ====
The Battery C, 206th CA monument in Jonesboro, Arkansas includes the names of several former 206th Coast Artillery members who were killed in action with other units after the breakup of the 206th Coast Artillery Regiment in 1944.

- Kenneth Burkhart
- Clifford Cloud
- Joseph J. Eble
- John H. Franklin
- Charles Hutton
- Cletis Jeffers
- Fred Johnson
- James Lemmer
- Owen "H" Lynch
- Carl Neal
- Ray Shreeve
- Frank Sweeney
- Roy Wiles (probably the same as Pvt. James R. Wiles listed as KIA from Dutch Harbor)

== Campaign participation credit ==
=== World War I ===
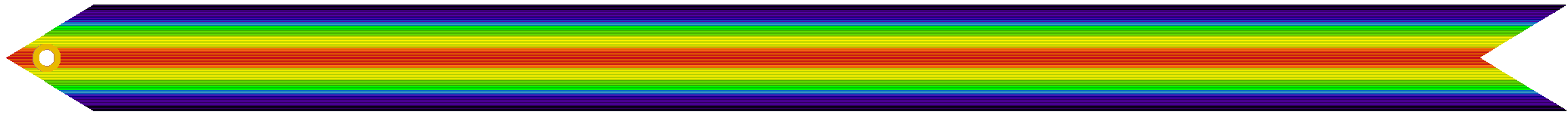

=== World War II ===
- Aleutian Islands 1942–1943
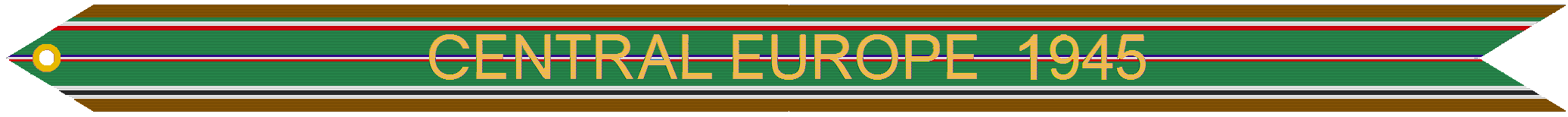
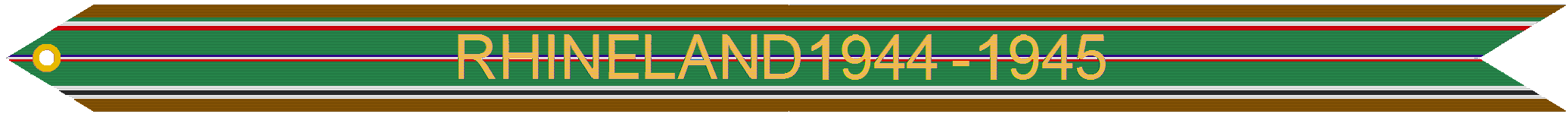

=== War on Terrorism ===
- Transition of Iraq – 2003 to 2004
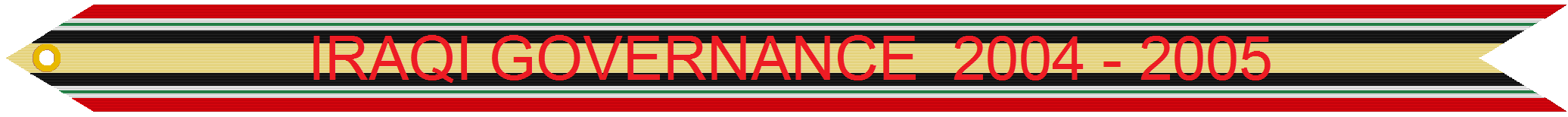
- Iraqi Governance – 2004 to 2005
- Iraqi Surge – 2007 to 2008

==== Headquarters Battery (Russellville and Paris), 1st Battalion, additionally entitled to ====
Southwest Asia

  - Defense of Saudi Arabia 1990–1991
  - Liberation and Defense of Kuwait 1991
  - Cease-Fire 1991–1995

===== World War I =====
- Silver Band without inscription

===== World War II =====
- European-African-Middle Eastern
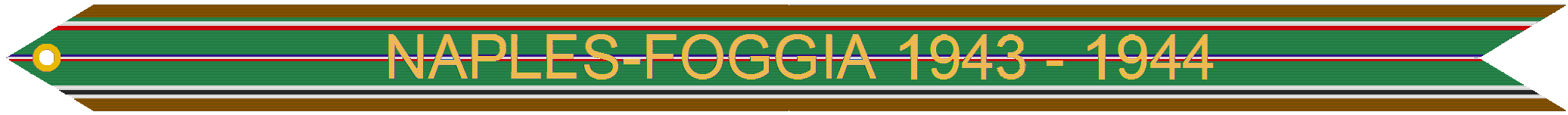
- Naples-Foggia
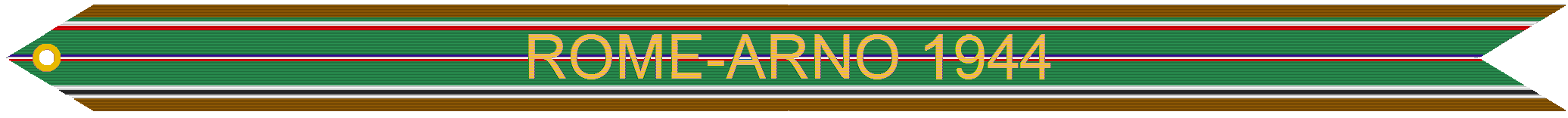
- Rome-Arno
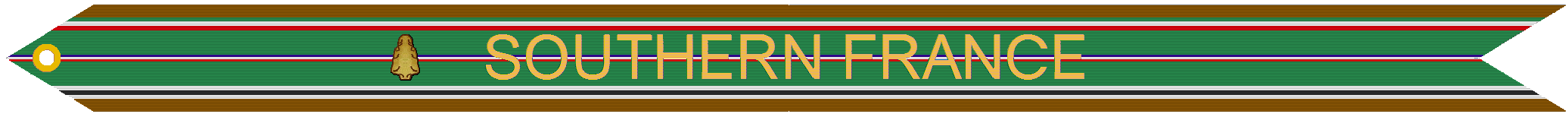
- Southern France 1944
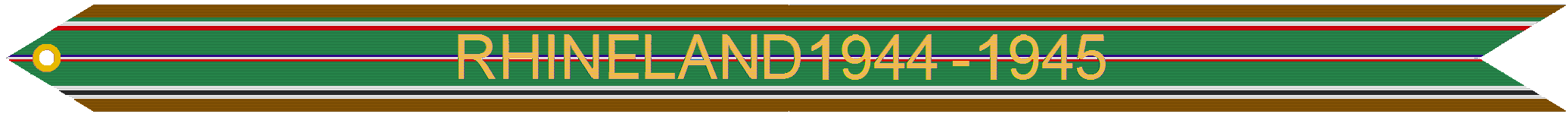
- Rhineland
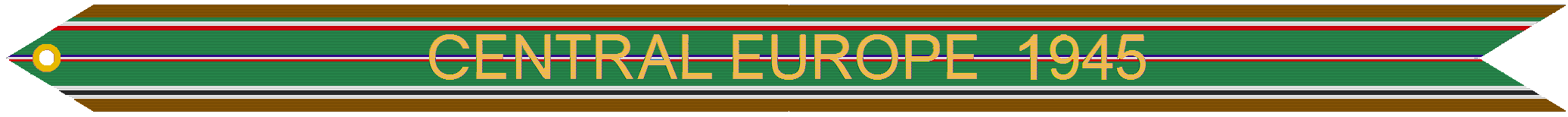
- Central Europe 1945
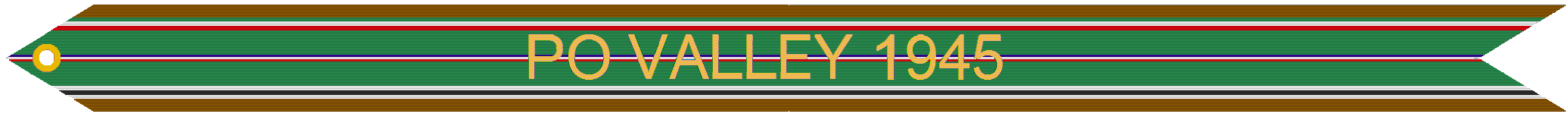
- Po Valley

===== Korean War =====
- 1st U.N. Counter Offensive 1951
- CCF Spring Offensive 1951
- U.N. Summer-Fall Offensive 1951
- Second Korean Winter 1951–1952
- Korea Summer-Fall, 1952
- Third Korean Winter 1952–1953
- Korea Summer 1953

== Unit awards ==
1st Battalion, 206th Field Artillery

- Combat Action Battalion, 2004–2005
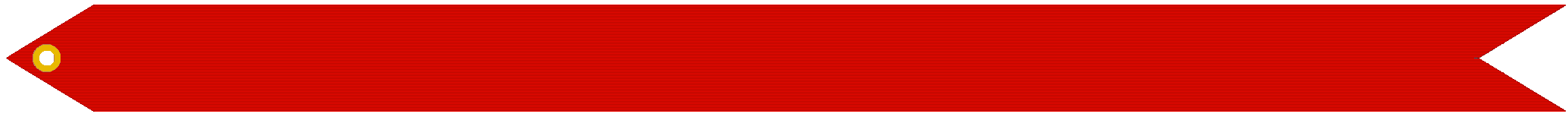
- Meritorious Unit Commendation 2004–2005

Headquarters and Headquarters Battery (Russellville), 1st Battalion, additionally entitled to:

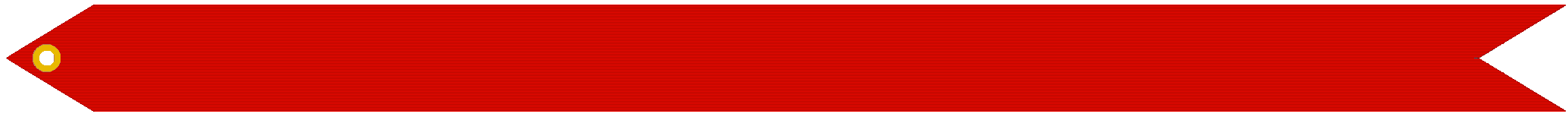
- Meritorious Unit Commendation 1991

B Battery (Dardanelle and Paris), 1st Battalion, additionally entitled to:

- Republic of Korea Presidential Unit Citation
- Steamer Embroidered Korea 1951–1952

== Past commanders ==
=== 141st Machine Gun Battalion ===
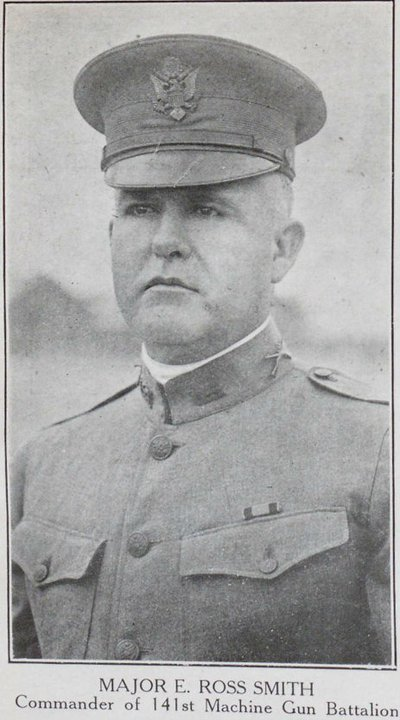
MAJ E Ross Smith, 1918

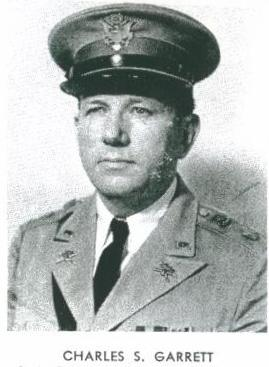
Major Charles S. Garrett, commanded the 141st Machine Gun Battalion during World War I, 1918–1919, 1921–1923

=== 206th Coast Artillery ===
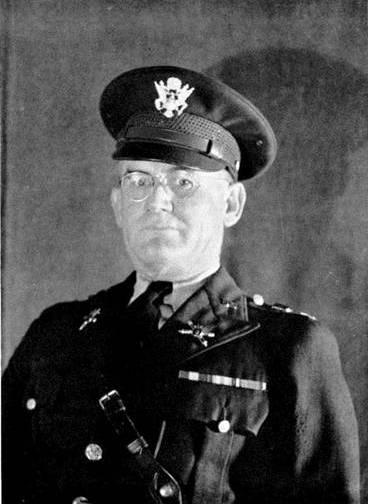
COL Elgan Clayton Robertson, 1924–1944, Commanded the 206th CA during World War II, until the regiment was disbanded in 1944

=== 437th Field Artillery Battalion (1–206th Field Artillery) ===
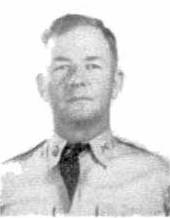
LTC Sherman T. Clinger, 1950

=== 445th Field Artillery Battalion(2–206th Field Artillery) ===
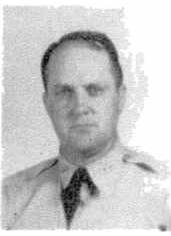
William L. Ward, Jr, 1950

=== 5th Battalion, 206th Field Artillery ===
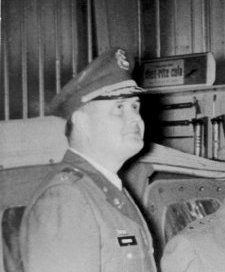
LTC Paul Burrus Benham, Jr., 1967–1969

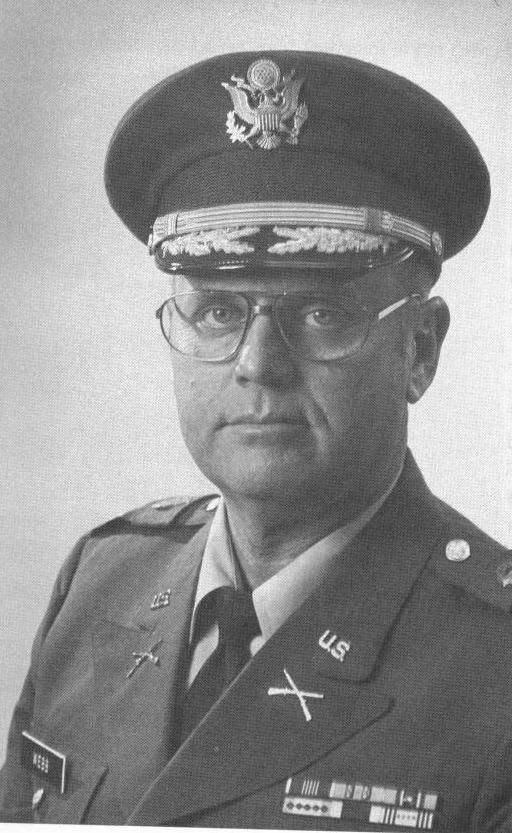
LTC John B. Webb, Jr., 1969–1972

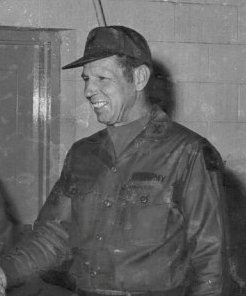
LTC Wendall Workman, 1972–1974

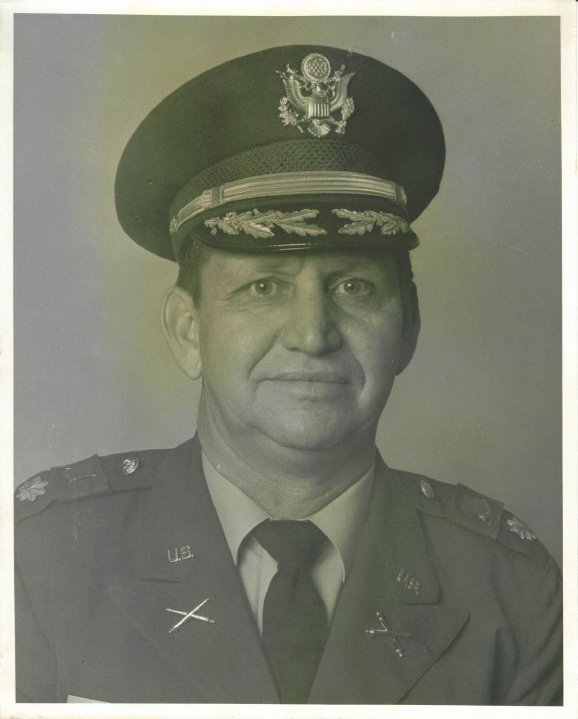
LTC Oliver W. Myers, 1974–1976

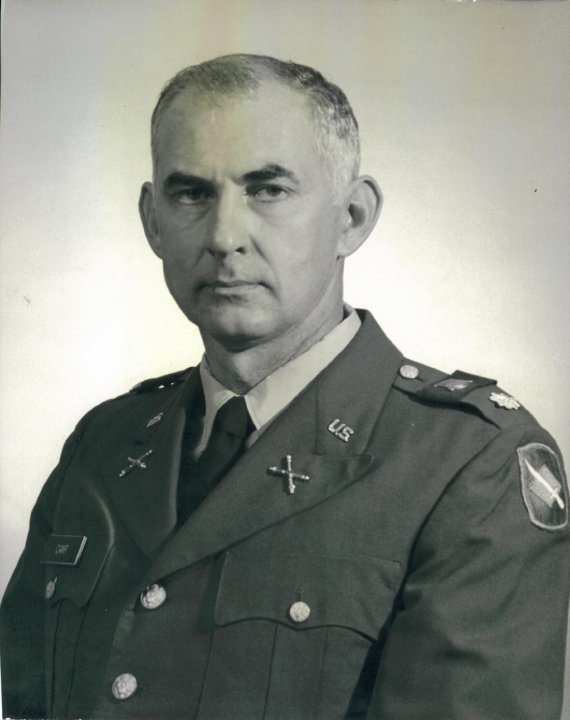
LTC Leon R. Camp, 1976–1978

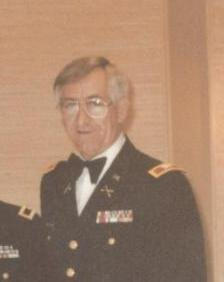
LTC Ken O. McClanahan, 1978–1981

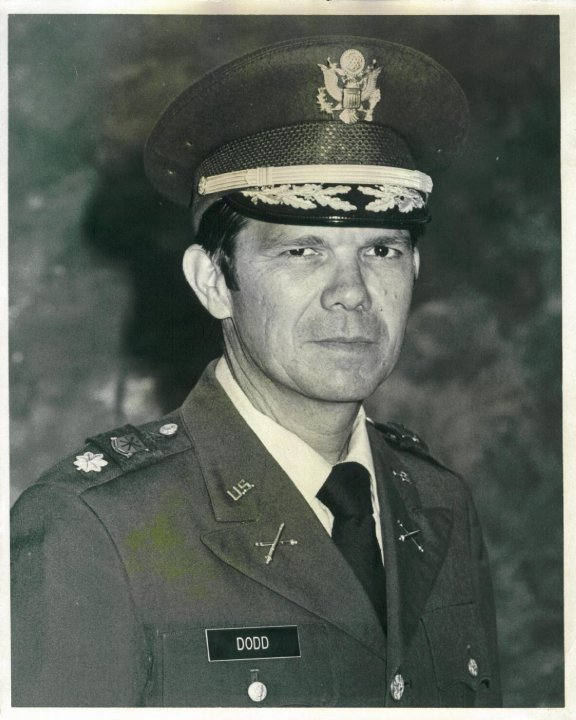
LTC David G. Dodd, 1981–1984.jpg

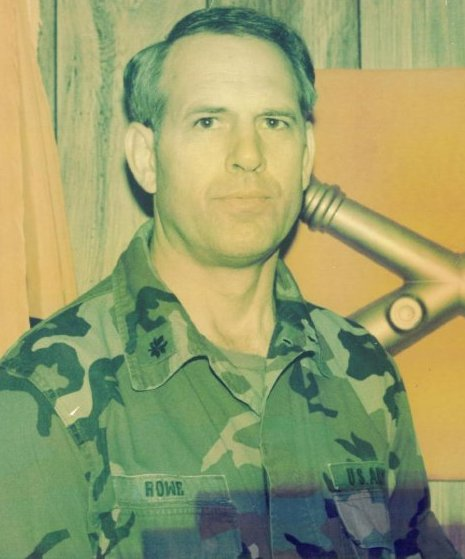
LTC Roy Rowe, 1984–1987

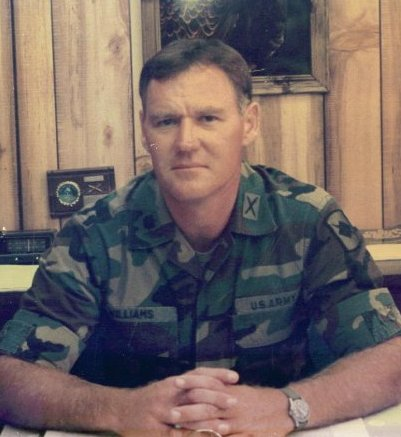
LTC Anderson H. Williams III, 1987–1989

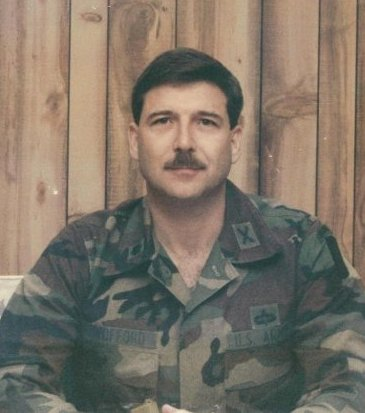
LTC William D. Wofford, 1989–1990

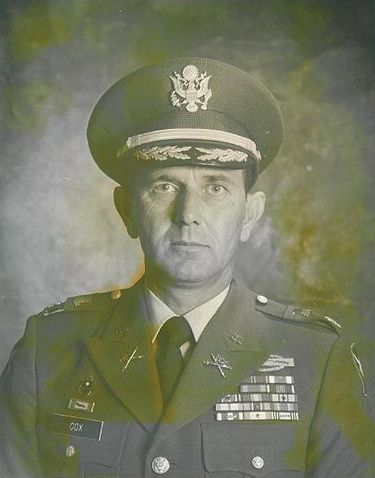
LTC John Cox, 1990–1993

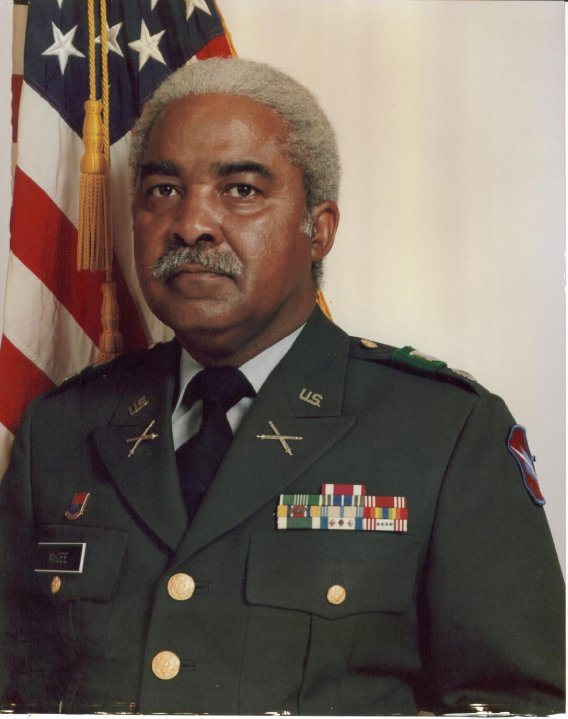
LTC Nathanal McGee, 1993–1995

=== 1st Battalion, 206th Field Artillery ===
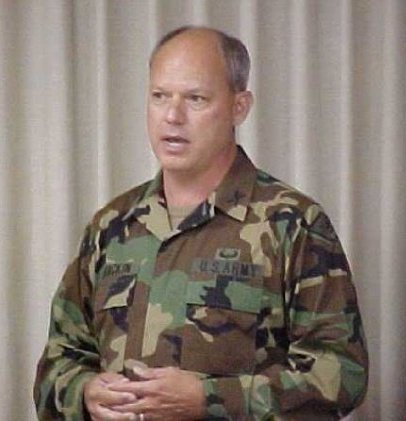
LTC John L. Brackin, Last commander of the 5–206th FA, 1995–1996, and the first commander of the 1–206th FA, 1996–1997.

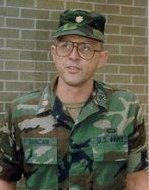
LTC David Duncan, 1997–1999

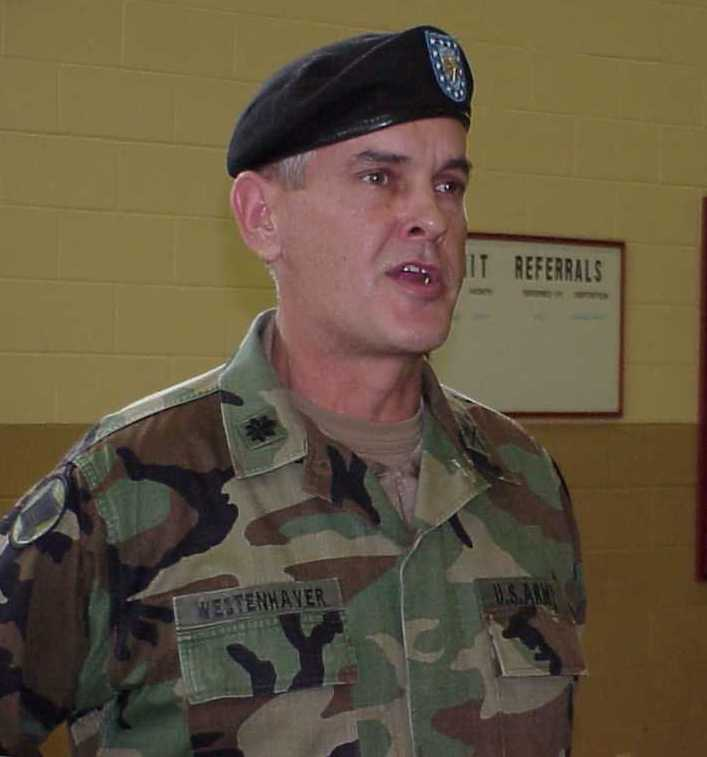
LTC Randal C. Westenhaver 1999–2002

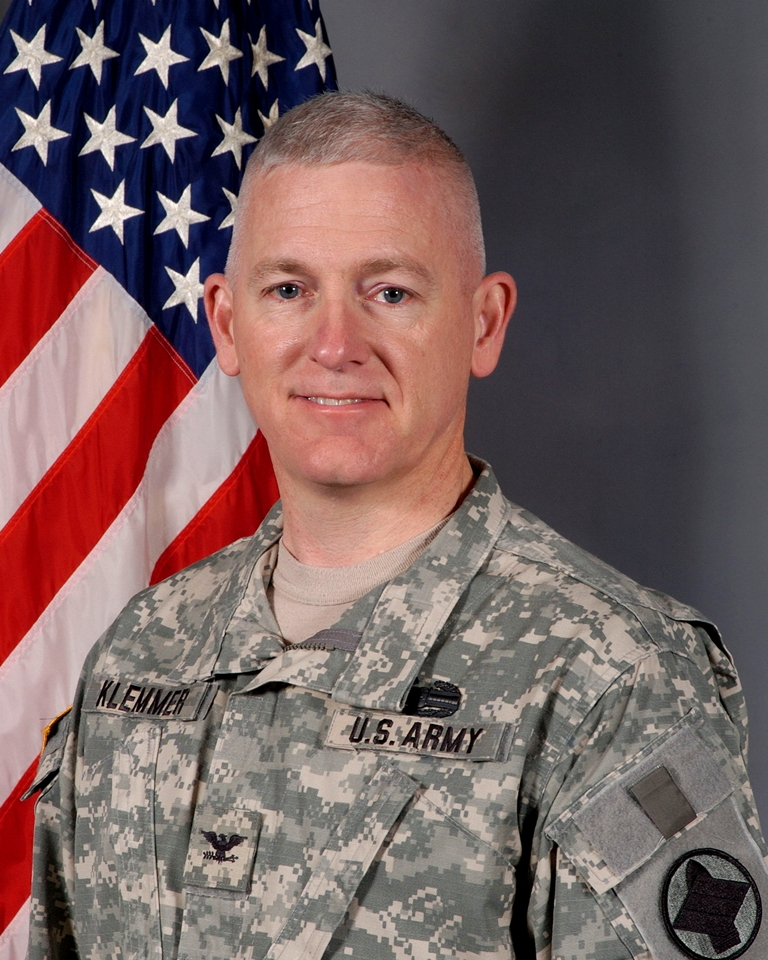
LTC Keith A. Klemmer, 2002–2005, Commanded the 1–206th FA during Operation Iraqi Freedom II

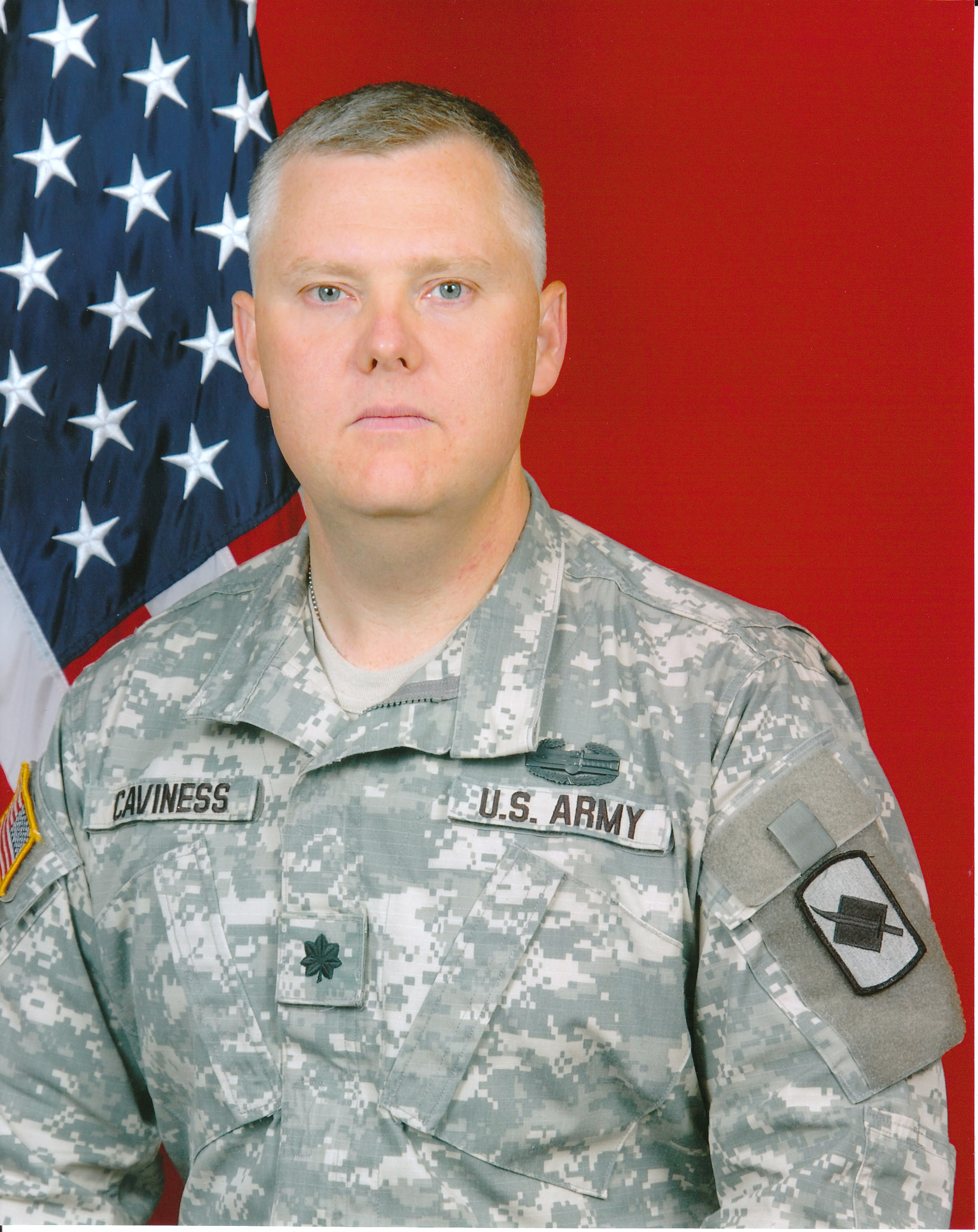
LTC Paul Caviness, 2005–2007

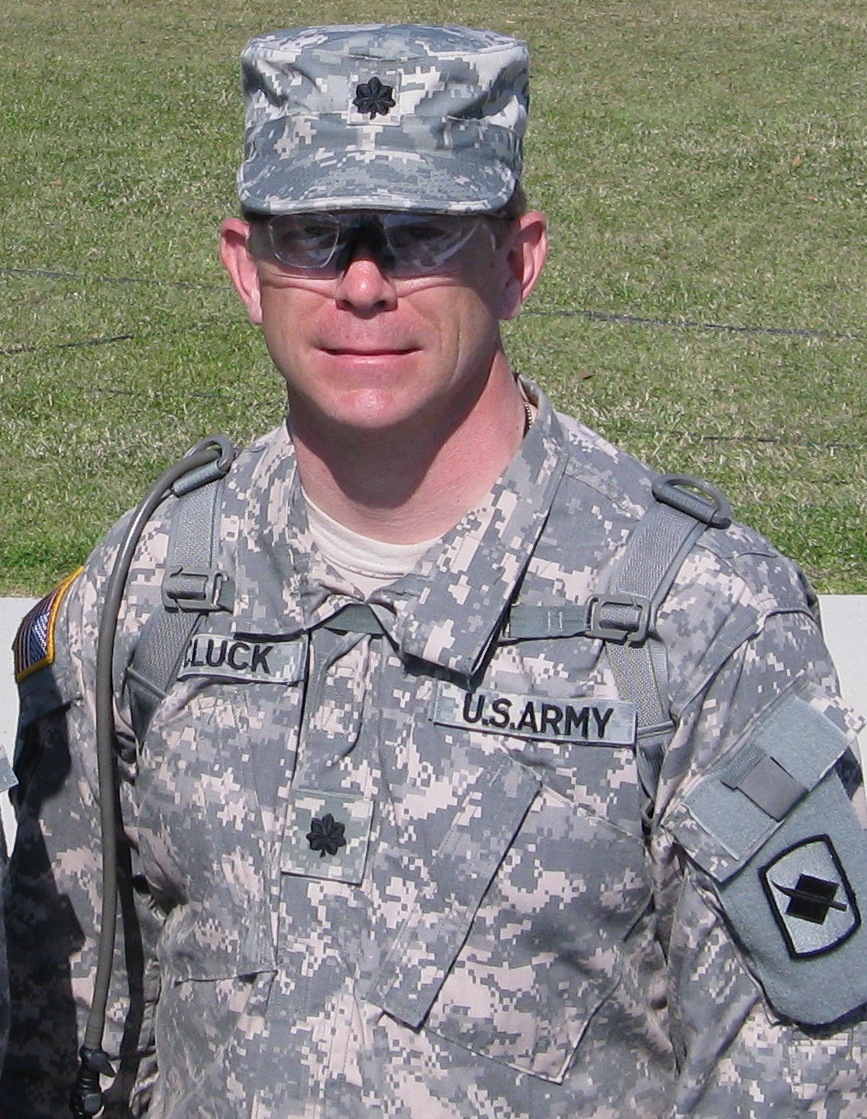
LTC Damon N. Cluck 2005–2007, Commanded the 1–206th FA during Operation Iraqi Freedom 08-09

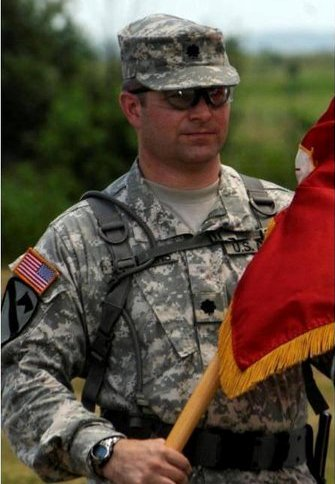
LTC Michael E. "Mike" Spraggins, 2010 to 2012

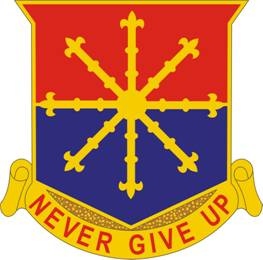
LTC Richard E. Hamby, 2012 to 2014

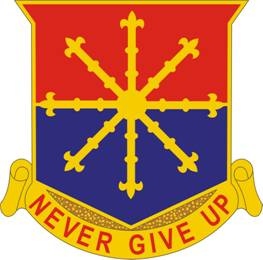
LTC Daniel K. Cox, 2014 to 2016

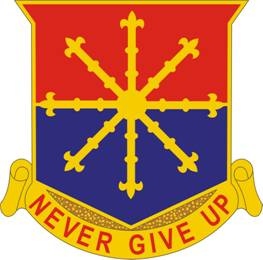
LTC Joseph M. Rhees, 2016 to 2018

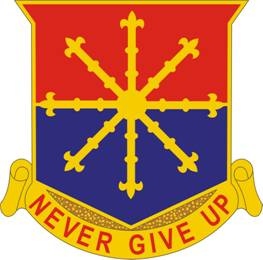
LTC Ross E. Brashears, 2018 to 2020

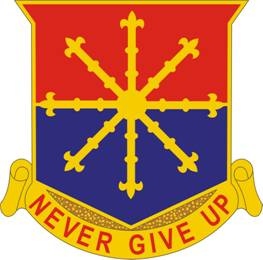
LTC Jonathan M. Smith, 2020 to 2022

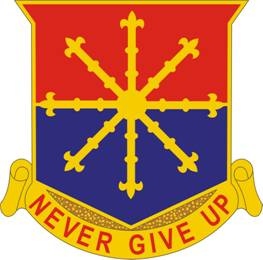
LTC Eric E. Gonzalez, 2022 to present

== Former members ==
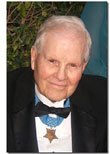

Nathan Green Gordon enlisted in Battery D, 206th Coast Artillery while attending Arkansas Polytechnical College at Russellville, Arkansas, 1935–1938. After graduating from Arkansas Polytechnical College, Mr. Gordon attended the University of Arkansas Law School at Fayetteville, Arkansas. Mr. Gordon enlisted in the United States Navy in May 1941. After qualifying as a naval aviator, he was sent to the southwest Pacific Ocean, where he would serve more than two years. By 15 February 1944, he was a lieutenant, junior grade, in command of a Catalina, Bureau Number 08139, which he nicknamed Arkansas Traveler. On that day, Gordon rescued 15 survivors of several downed aircraft of the United States Army Air Forces, for which he was awarded the Medal of Honor. In 1946, when he was elected Lieutenant Governor of Arkansas under Governor Benjamin Travis Laney. He took office in January 1947 and was re-elected to nine more two-year terms, finally leaving office in January 1967. During his tenure he served under four different Governors: Laney (1945–1949), Sid McMath (1949–1953), Francis Cherry (1953–1955), and Orval Faubus (1955–1967). Lt Governor Gordon died 8 September. 2008 and is buried in Morrilton, Arkansas.

Two former members of the 206th Field Artillery have gone on to serve as the Adjutant General of the State of Arkansas.

Major General Sherman T. Clinger commanded the 437th Field artillery from 1946–1950. MG Clinger had previously commanded the 1st Battalion, 142nd Field Artillery during World War II. MG Clinger was appointed to serve as the Adjutant General of Arkansas from 1955–1966 by Governor Orval Faubus. MG Clinger is most remembered for his role in the Little Rock Central High School Integration Crisis when the Arkansas National Guard was first ordered to keep the peace by preventing the integration of the Little Rock School System and was later federalized by President Eisenhower to protect African American students.

Major General William D. Wofford commanded the 5th Battalion, 206th Field Artillery from 1989–1990. MG Wofford left command of the 5–206th in order to assume command of the 2nd Battalion, 142nd Field Artillery during that battalion's deployment in support of Operation Desert Storm\Desert Shield. MG Wofford's other assignments included, Chief of Staff, Arkansas Army National Guard, and Deputy Commander, United States Forces Command. MG Wofford was appointed as the Adjutant General of Arkansas by Governor Mike Beebe in 2007 and served in this position until his retirement in 2015.

One additional former member of the 206th Field Artillery also rose to the rank of Major General:

Major General Elder Granger began his military career as an enlisted medic assigned to the Headquarters and Headquarters Service Battery, 5th Battalion, 206th Field Artillery in West Memphis, Arkansas. He earned a Bachelor of Science degree from Arkansas State University in 1976. A distinguished military graduate, Dr Granger was commissioned through the Reserve Officers' Training Corps (ROTC). Upon graduation from the University of Arkansas School of Medicine in 1980, he was awarded the Henry Kaiser Medical Fellowship for Medical Excellence and Leadership. Dr Granger completed a residency in internal medicine in 1983 and a fellowship in hematology-oncology in 1986 at Fitzsimmons Army Medical Center. MG Granger retired in 2009 while serving as the Deputy Director and Program Executive Officer of the TRICARE Management Activity, Office of the Assistant Secretary of Defense (Health Affairs), Washington, DC.

== Current unit locations ==
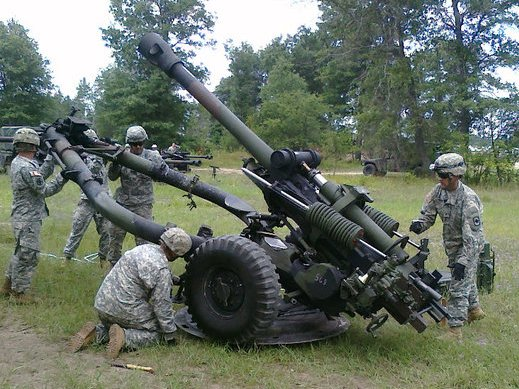
1–206th FA soldiers conduct new equipment training on the M119A2 Howitzer at Camp Grayling, Michigan, 4 August 2010

Unit	Station
Headquarters and Headquarters Battery (HHB)	Russellville
Detachment 1, HHB (Fire Support)	Paris
Battery A (-)	Morrilton
Detachment 1, Battery A	Dardanelle
Battery B	Rogers
Battery C	Booneville

== Current weapon system ==
The 1st Battalion, 206th Field Artillery conducted New Equipment Training on the M119A2 howitzer at Camp Grayling, Michigan in August 2010. The unit received the M119A2s in November 2010.

== Heraldry ==
=== Distinctive unit insignia ===
Description: A gold color metal and enamel device 1 inch (2.54 cm) in height overall consisting of a shield blazoned: Per fess Gules and Azure, an escarbuncle Or. Attached below the shield a gold scroll inscribed "NEVER GIVE UP" in red letters.

Symbolism: Scarlet and blue were the colors of the machine gun battalions during World War I and refer to the service of the 141st Machine Gun Battalion which became a part of the regiment when it was originally organized. The scarlet is also the color used for artillery. The escarbuncle is taken from the coat of arms of Chaumont, one of the principal towns in the Department of Haute-Marne, France, where the 141st Machine Gun Battalion was stationed during World War I.

Background: The distinctive unit insignia was originally approved for the 206th Coast Artillery (AA) on 14 January 1930. It was redesignated for the 206th Artillery Regiment on 12 May 1970. The insignia was redesignated for the 206th Field Artillery Regiment on 19 July 1972.

=== Coat of Arms ===
Blazon: Shield: Per fess Gules and Azure, an escarbuncle Or.

Crest: That for the regiments and separate battalions of the Arkansas Army National Guard: On a wreath of the colors Or and Gules above two sprays of apple blossoms Proper a diamond Argent charged with four mullets Azure, one in upper point and three in lower, within a bordure of the last, bearing twenty-five mullets of the second.

Motto: NEVER GIVE UP.

Symbolism:

Shield: Scarlet and blue were the colors of Machine Gun Battalions during World War I and refer to the service of the 141st Machine Gun Battalion which became a part of the regiment when it was originally organized. The scarlet is also the color used for Artillery. The escarbuncle is taken from the coat of arms of Chaumont, one of the principal towns in the Department of Haute-Marne, France, where the 141st Machine Gun Battalion was stationed during World War I.

Crest: The crest is that of the Arkansas Army National Guard.

Background: The coat of arms was originally approved for the 206th Coast Artillery (AA) on 14 January 1930. It was redesignated for the 206th Artillery Regiment on 12 May 1970. The insignia was redesignated for the 206th Field Artillery Regiment on 19 July 1972.

== Bibliography ==
- Goldstein, Donald M. and Katherine V. Dillon. The Williwaw War: the Arkansas National Guard in the Aleutians in World War II. Fayetteville: University of Arkansas Press, 1992.
