= 198 =

198 may also refer to:

- 198 (number)
- AD 198
- 198 BC
- 198 (New Jersey bus)
- Jordan 198
- UFC 198
- 198 Ampella
- Arado Ar 198
- X-Men: The 198
- Radical 198
- Lectionary 198
- NGC 199

== See also ==
- 198th (disambiguation)
