= Transbaikal Military District =

Soviet and Russian military command

- Boundaries of the Transbaikal Military District (in red) on 1 January 1989
- Active: May 17, 1935 – December 1, 1998
- Country: Soviet Union; Russia
- Type: Military district
- Headquarters: Chita
- Engagements: World War II

The Transbaikal Military District (Russian: Забайкальский военный округ) was a military district of first the Soviet Armed Forces and then the Armed Forces of the Russian Federation, formed on 17 May 1935 and included the Buryat Republic, Chita Oblast, and Yakutia. Chita was the headquarters of the district. It was finally disbanded on 1 December 1998 by being amalgamated with the Siberian Military District, though Chita remained the headquarters of the new amalgamated district.

== History ==
=== Formation and World War II ===
The district was formed on 17 May 1935 in response to the Japanese invasion of China and military escalation in the region from the Transbaikal Group of the Special Red Banner Far Eastern Army, previously responsible for the region. The district was covered the territory of the East Siberian Krai and the Yakut Autonomous Soviet Socialist Republic.

By 1937 the district, headquartered at Chita, included the 57th and 93rd (Chita) Rifle Divisions, 15th and 22nd Cavalry Divisions, Separate Buryat-Mongolian Cavalry Brigade (Ulan-Ude), and the 11th Mechanized Corps with the 6th and 32nd Mechanized Brigades, the 25th Armored Brigade, and the Transbaikal Fortified Region. The air force of the district, under the 5th Aviation Corps, included the 29th and 101st Heavy Bomber, 64th High-Speed Bomber, and 109th Light Assault Aviation Brigades, and a special purpose aviation group.

In the district and the 57th Special Rifle Corps, 112 command personnel were executed and 108 arrested or imprisoned during the Great Purge, exceeding the 35 command personnel lost at Khalkhin Gol. Those executed included district commander Ivan Gryaznov and his successor Mikhail Velikanov. Most of the district's senior command personnel when the purge began were executed or sentenced to imprisonment, including the chief of staff and his successor, political commissar, the chief of the political department, deputy commander, the assistant commander for the air force and his successor, and the assistant commander for logistical support, chief of armored and mechanized forces, chief of staff of the air force, and chief of artillery. Repression affected all levels of senior command with almost all of the district's corps, division, and brigade commanders executed, sentenced to imprisonment, or arrested.

By August 1939 the district had an actual strength of 188,219 personnel, including 3,810 in military schools. The armies and corps of the district took part in the battle of Khalkhin Gol under General Georgy Zhukov. In June 1940 the 16th Army was formed in the District before being transferred to the west. On June 22, 1941, the District comprised the 17th Army, Air and Air Defence commands, 12th Rifle Corps (65th and 94th Rifle Divisions), 93rd Rifle Division, the Transbaikal Fortified Region, two gun artillery regiments, a howitzer artillery regiment, and smaller units. The Transbaikal Military District became the Transbaikal Front; a front formed on September 15, 1941 in order to prevent a possible attack by the Japanese Kwantung Army. Against the general trend of Soviet tank divisions being disbanded in the first few months of the German invasion during the Second World War, due to heavy losses, the 57th and 61st Tank Divisions were active in the District in 1941.

=== Cold War ===
On 30 September 1945 the Transbaikal Front was disbanded and reorganized as the Transbaikal-Amur Military District, following the success of the Soviet invasion of Manchuria. On 10 July 1947, Headquarters Transbaikal-Amur Military District was amalgamated with HQ 36th Army to become the Transbaikal Military District (second formation). The district included the Buryat-Mongol Autonomous Soviet Socialist Republic, Chita Oblast, and Khabarovsk Krai (not including Kamchatka and Sakhalin Oblasts, then included in this krai). Until 1953 the district was subordinate to the Commander-in-Chief of the forces of the Far East. After the abolition of the East Siberian Military District in October 1953, the territory of the Irkutsk Oblast and the Yakut ASSR was included in the district boundaries, with the 31st Rifle Corps. The boundaries of the district remained constant from this time, and the Soviet group of forces in Mongolia reported to the district commander.

In 1955 the 61st Tank Division became the 13th Tank Division, then two years later the 13th Motor Rifle Division (Ulan Ude), but was then disbanded in 1957. The 6th Guards Tank Army was stationed in Mongolia for fifteen years after the end of the war, reporting to the Transbaikal Military District. The then friendship with China and the Khrushchev reductions in the Soviet Ground Forces' strength meant the 6th Guards Tank Army was relocated to Dnipro in the Kiev Military District by summer 1957. Perhaps as a consequence, the 9th Guards Motor Rifle Division was disestablished.

On October 1, 1961, in accordance with the directive of the General Staff of the USSR Armed Forces No. OSH/2/347491 dated August 26, 1961, the 806th independent Company of Special Designation (or in Western terms Special Forces) (Military Unit 64656) numbering 117 people was formed in the Transbaikal Military District with direct subordination to the district headquarters.

In the late 1960s the situation on the Sino-Soviet border became more tense and many new units were sent to Siberia, or formed there, such as the 29th Army. Among these formations was the 11th Guards Motor Rifle Division, which was transferred from Smolensk to Bezrechnaya in May 1968. Thanks to this buildup, Chita became one of the developed cities in Eastern Siberia. Units of the district participated in the Battle of Damansky Island in 1969. In 1988 the District included the 29th Army at Ulan-Ude (5th Guards Tank Division, 52nd, 91st and 245th Motor Rifle Divisions), the 36th Army at Borzya (11th Guards, 38th Guards, and 122nd Guards Motor Rifle Divisions), the 212th Guards District Training Centre at Chita (just renamed from the 49th Tank Training Division), the 150th Training Motor Rifle Division, and the 39th Army, controlling Soviet troops in Mongolia, which had its headquarters at Ulan-Bator and included the 2nd Guards Tank Division, 51st Tank Division, and 12th, 41st, and 91st Motor Rifle Divisions. The Soviet troops in Mongolia were finally withdrawn between 1989 and 1992. Air support to the troops in Mongolia was provided for a time by the 44th Mixed Aviation Corps headquartered at Choybalsan, from 1982 until 1988.

A Mil Mi-8 helicopter of the 36th Combined Arms Army's 112th Independent Helicopter Regiment crashed while attempting to assist in Ukraine after the 1986 Chernobyl disaster.

=== Russian Ground Forces and disbandment ===
In 1998, the Trans-Baikal Military District was merged with the Siberian Military District, in accordance with Presidential Decree № 900 of 27.07.1998, and the order of the Ministry of Defence of the Russian Federation № 048 of August 11, 1998. The new composition of the Siberian Military District actually began operations on December 1, 1998.

== Air Forces ==
Air Force support to the district in the immediate post Great Patriotic War years may have been drawn from 12th Air Army (its headquarters was at Chita from 1945). In January 1949 12th Air Army was redesignated 45th Air Army. In July 1957 the 45th Air Army became the Air Forces of the Transbaikal Military District (ZabVO). On 29 July 1967 the Air Forces of the ZabVO became 23rd Air Army. According to the directive of the USSR Ministry of Defense on July 22, 1967 in ZabVO were collected two dozen air regiments, grouped within the 23rd Air Army. The predominance of these shock bomber and fighter-bombers in a fair extent permitted offset the numerical superiority of the opposing factions, the blessing of the "wild steppes of Transbaikalia" became those for aviation comparatively easy prey.

In 1980 the 23rd Air Army became Air Forces of the ZabVO. In 1990 the 23rd Air Army was reformed from the Air Forces of the Transbaikal Military District. Commander of the 23rd Air Army, General Lieutenant Dimitri Kutsekon, was killed in a helicopter crash in August 1996. A late 1980s(?) order of battle for the 23rd Air Army is at . In 1998 the 23rd Air Army was merged with the 14th Army of the Air Defense Forces and the 50th Independent Air Defence Corps of the Air Defence Forces to become the new 14th Air and Air Defence Forces Army.

== Commanders 1921-1996 ==
- Stepan Mikhailovich Seryshev 1921
- Albert Lapin 1921-1922
- Komkor Ivan Gryaznov (1935-1937)
- Komandarm 2nd rank Mikhail Velikanov (1937)
- Komkor Mikhail Yefremov (1937-1938)
- Kombrig Vsevolod Yakovlev 1938-1939
- Kombrig Fedor Remezov 1939-1940
- Colonel General Ivan Konev 1940-1941
- Lieutenant general Pavel Kurochkin 1941
- Lieutenant general Mikhail Kovalyov 1941
- General Andrey Yeryomenko ( - July 1941)
- Colonel-General Mikhail Kovalyov (July 1941 - 1945)
- Marshal of the Soviet Union Rodion Malinovsky (1945–1947)
- Colonel-General Konstantin Koroteev (1947–1951)
- Colonel-General Dmitry Gusev (1951–1952)
- Lieutenant-General (Colonel-General since 1954) Yefim Trotsenko (1952–1956)
- Colonel-General Dmitry Lelyushenko (1956–1958)
- Colonel-General Yakov Kreizer (1958–1960)
- Colonel-General Dmitry Alekseev (1960–1966)
- General Pyotr Belik (1966–1978)
- General Grigory Salmanov (1978–1984)
- General Stanislav Postnikov (1984–1987)
- Colonel-General Anatoly Betekhtin (1987–1988)
- General Lieutenant Vladimir Semyonov (1988–1991)
- General Lieutenant Valery Tretyakov (1991–1996)
