= Tsaydam =

Tsaydam Цайдам
- Ulus
- Location within Republic of Buryatia Location within Russia
- Coordinates: 51°06′N 106°21′E
- Country: Russia
- Region: Republic of Buryatia
- District: Selenginsky District
- Time zone: UTC+8:00

Tsaydam (Russian: Цайдам; Buryat: Сайдам, Saidam) is a rural locality (an ulus) in Selenginsky District, Republic of Buryatia, Russia. The population was 206 as of 2010. There are 5 streets.

== Geography ==
Tsaydam is located 36 km southwest of Gusinoozyorsk (the district's administrative centre) by road. Gusinoye Ozero is the nearest rural locality.
