= Nur-Tukhum =

Nur-Tukhum Нур-Тухум
- Ulus
- Location within Republic of Buryatia Location within Russia
- Coordinates: 50°48′N 106°26′E
- Country: Russia
- Region: Republic of Buryatia
- District: Selenginsky District
- Time zone: UTC+8:00

Nur-Tukhum (Russian: Нур-Тухум; Buryat: Нуур Тγхэм, Nuur Tükhem) is a rural locality (an ulus) in Selenginsky District, Republic of Buryatia, Russia. The population was 674 as of 2010. There are 30 streets.

== Geography ==
Nur-Tukhum is located 69 km south of Gusinoozyorsk (the district's administrative centre) by road. Novodesyatnikovo is the nearest rural locality.
