= Sulfat =

Sulfat Сульфат
- Settlement
- Location within Republic of Buryatia Location within Russia
- Coordinates: 51°21′N 106°33′E
- Country: Russia
- Region: Republic of Buryatia
- District: Selenginsky District

Population (2010)
  - Total: 18
- Time zone: UTC+8:00 (Irkutsk Time)
- Postal code: 671282
- Area code: +7 30145

Sulfat (Russian: Сульфат) is a rural locality (a settlement) in Selenginsky District, Republic of Buryatia, Russia. The population was 18 as of 2010.

== Geography ==
Sulfat is located 16 km northeast of Gusinoozyorsk (the district's administrative centre) by road. Tokhoy is the nearest rural locality.
