= Burgastay =

Burgastay Бургастай
- Ulus
- Location within Republic of Buryatia Location within Russia
- Coordinates: 51°09′N 106°37′E
- Country: Russia
- Region: Republic of Buryatia
- District: Selenginsky District
- Time zone: UTC+8:00

Burgastay (Russian: Бургастай; Buryat: Бургаастай, Burgaastai) is a rural locality (an ulus) in Selenginsky District, Republic of Buryatia, Russia. The population was 96 as of 2010.

== Geography ==
Burgastay is located 38 km south of Gusinoozyorsk (the district's administrative centre) by road. Novoselenginsk is the nearest rural locality.
