= Bilyutay, Selenginsky District, Republic of Buryatia =

Bilyutay Билютай
- Selo
- Location within Republic of Buryatia Location within Russia
- Coordinates: 50°52′N 106°14′E
- Country: Russia
- Region: Republic of Buryatia
- District: Selenginsky District
- Time zone: UTC+8:00

Bilyutay (Russian: Билютай; Buryat: Бγлюутэ, Büliuute) is a rural locality (a selo) in Selenginsky District, Republic of Buryatia, Russia. The population was 212 as of 2010. There are 11 streets.

== Geography ==
Bilyutay is located 96 km southeast of Gusinoozyorsk (the district's administrative centre) by road. Podlopatki and Verkhny Mangirtuy are the nearest rural locality.
