= Nizhny Ubukun =

Nizhny Ubukun Нижний Убукун
- Selo
- Location within Republic of Buryatia Location within Russia
- Coordinates: 51°31′N 106°53′E
- Country: Russia
- Region: Republic of Buryatia
- District: Selenginsky District
- Time zone: UTC+8:00

Nizhny Ubukun (Russian: Нижний Убукун; Buryat: Доодо Бγхэн, Doodo Bükhen) is a rural locality (a selo) in Selenginsky District, Republic of Buryatia, Russia. The population was 207 as of 2010.

== Geography ==
Nizhny Ubukun is located 42 km northeast of Gusinoozyorsk (the district's administrative centre) by road. Khargana is the nearest rural locality.
