= Andrei Kolesnikov (general) =

Russian general (born 1977)

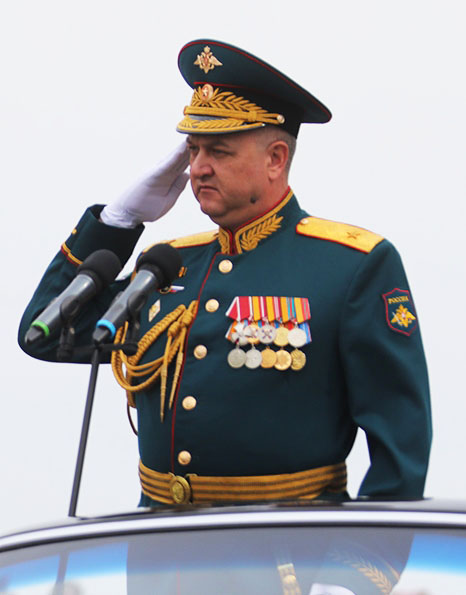
- Kolesnikov in 2021
- Born: 6 February 1977 (age 49); Oktyabrskoye, Voronezh Oblast, Russian SFSR, Soviet Union
- Military career
- Allegiance: Russia
- Branch: Russian Ground Forces
- Service years: 1999–?
- Rank: Major general
- Commands: 29th Combined Arms Army
- Conflicts: Russo-Ukrainian War; Russian invasion of Ukraine; Siege of Mariupol; Russian military intervention in the Syrian civil war

Andrei Borisovich Kolesnikov (Russian: Андрей Борисович Колесников; born 6 February 1977) is a Russian major-general who commanded the 29th Combined Arms Army at the start of the Russian invasion of Ukraine. He was later the deputy commander of the Russian Armed Forces Operational Group in Syria as of 2023.

== Biography ==
Born in Oktyabrskoye, Voronezh Oblast, on 6 February 1977, Kolesnikov graduated from a tank college in Kazan (1999), the Combined Arms Academy of the Armed Forces of the Russian Federation (2008), and the Military Academy of the General Staff of the Armed Forces of Russia (2020). In 2010, Kolesnikov was a lieutenant colonel and serving as chief of staff of the 4th Guards Tank Division. He was promoted to the rank of major-general and appointed, in December 2021, the former commander of the 29th Combined Arms Army of the Eastern Military District in the Zabaykalsky Krai.

=== Invasion of Ukraine ===
Kolesnikov took part in the Russian invasion of Ukraine. According to Ukrainian officials, he was killed in Mariupol on 11 March 2022. NATO officials confirmed that a Russian commander from Russia's eastern military district became the second Russian general officer to be killed in the hostilities (after Andrei Sukhovetsky), but did not specify his name. However, the Ukrainian claim had not been verified by Western media and Russian sources had not confirmed his death. On 14 March 2023, Kolesnikov appeared in an interview with Vladimir Soloviev on Russian television, reportedly during Soloviev's trip to Syria.

=== Syria ===
As of March 2023 Kolesnikov was deputy commander of Russian forces in Syria.

Military offices
Preceded by Roman Berdnikov	Commander of the 29th Combined Arms Army; 2021–2022	Succeeded by Aleksandr Ignatenko
Preceded by Sergey Kombarov	Commander of the 4th Guards Tank Division; 2011–2012	Succeeded by Vladimir Zavadsky
Preceded by ??	Chief of Staff of the 4th Guards Tank Division; 2010–2011	Succeeded by ??
