= Khargana, Selenginsky District, Republic of Buryatia =

Khargana Харгана
- Ulus
- Location within Republic of Buryatia Location within Russia
- Coordinates: 51°30′N 106°51′E
- Country: Russia
- Region: Republic of Buryatia
- District: Selenginsky District
- Time zone: UTC+8:00

Khargana (Russian: Харгана) is a rural locality (an ulus) in Selenginsky District, Republic of Buryatia, Russia. The population was 950 as of 2010. There are 42 streets.

== Geography ==
Khargana is located 36 km northeast of Gusinoozyorsk (the district's administrative centre) by road. Nizhny Ubukun is the nearest rural locality.
