= Borys Steklyar =

Borys Yukhymovych Steklyar Ukrainian: Бори́с Юхи́мович Стекляр, Russian: Борис Ефимович Стекляр (29 January 1923, Novohrad-Volynskyi – 18 January 2018, Rivne) was colonel of Committee for State Security of USSR, he was one of the main specialists in combating Ukrainian Insurgent Army in Rivne region.

In 2017 he was accused of the murder of two or more persons in March 1952, including artist and member of Volyn regional OUN propaganda Referenty Nil Khasevych and two of his colleagues. Steklyar insisted he was innocent of the murder.

== Biography ==
Born in a family of soldier of Red Army in Novohrad-Volynskyi, where his father served.

He went to war in August 1941 at his own request. He was taken into 38th Separate Communication Battalion to the position of motorcycle machine gunner. During the retreat at Uman he received shrapnel wounds to the head, after which he was transferred to the city Akbulak of Orenburg Oblast. After recovering in December 1941 he aimed at Kalinin Front to the 908th Rifle Regiment of 256th Rifle Division of 29th Army in the city Rzhev, where he was selected in the regimental reconnaissance platoon, in which he fought until December 1942 when he was seriously injured in the left leg while performing special tasks.

He fought at Stalingrad as squad commander. From March 1943 to February 1944, he studied in the 1st Leningrad Artillery School (Konstantinovsky Artillery School), which at that time was located in Engels. He graduated with honors, with specialization in artillery reconnaissance and received the rank of lieutenant.

After graduation, Steklyar was appointed commander of the reconnaissance platoon of 211th Artillery Regiment of 61st Army of 1st Belorussian Front. As part of the 61st Army he participated in the liberation of Belarus. Then he was sent to the 2nd Baltic Front, where he participated in the liberation of Riga, for which he was awarded the Order of the Great Patriotic War, Second Class. In November 1944 he was sent to Poland. For the liberation of Warsaw Steklyar was awarded the Order of the Great Patriotic War, First Class. He met victory in Germany (in Wittenberg). In May 1945 he was appointed company commander of SMERSH in Berlin.

Steklyar studied at Novosibirsk School of Counterintelligence of People's Commissariat of Defense SMERSH, from which he graduated with honors. Afterwards he was sent to Rivne to serve in organs of state security.

He retired in 1976 as Head of the KGB of Rivne Oblast. During the subsequent 33 years he has led the international agency "Intourist" in the city and oblast of Rivne.

=== Killing of Nil Khasevych ===
Nil Khasevych was the artist of OUN and UPA, an author of propaganda graphical materials distributed in the West, including the UN. Therefore, the Soviet state security decided to "stop his anti-Soviet activities". Steklyar participated in the final part of the operation. According to the words of Steklyar, on March 4, 1952, in the village Sukhivtsi Khasevych and two more insurgents were located in an underground bunker. After an offer to surrender, a grenade was thrown into the bunker.

On 26 April 2017 Prosecutor General of Ukraine launched an investigation into the murder of Nil Khasevych by Borys Steklyar. Steklyar made clear he did not feel guilty.

On 25 August 2016, the Administrative Court in Rivne District held a hearing in case Boris Steklyar against the Office of the SBU in Rivne region, which, contrary to the Law of Ukraine "On access to archives of repressive totalitarian communist regime in [the] 1917-1991 years," asked the court to compel the Office SBU Rivne region not to provide his personal file No.2095 for review. The claim was left without consideration.

Later analysis of the personal file and archive documents revealed that KGB colonel Boris Steklyar who participated in the liquidation of the underground artist of UPA Nil Khasevych in 1960 performing operational duties against Ukrainian nationalists in Soviet concentration camps. There is about the order of the Chairman of the KGB lieutenant general Vitaliy Nikitchenko No.85 dated 17 July 1964 to encourage the Office of the KGB in Rivnenskoiy area.

Among the award for skillfully prepared measures to debunk the ideology of Ukrainian bourgeois nationalists and show the achievements of the Ukrainian SSR during the Soviet period spent in Dubravny corrective labor camp Mordovia ASSR is also the name of Boris Steklyar.

In this camp served terms of imprisonment famous Ukrainian dissidents and former rebels Svyatoslav Karavansky, Ivan Gel, Vyacheslav Chornovil, Vasyl Levkovych, Yuriy Badzyo, Michaylo Soroka (died in camp), Josyf Slipyj and others.

As historian of Liberation Movement Research Center, the former deputy director of the SBU archive Vladimir Birchak stated, "measures", in which Steklyar participated in the camps likely have been something more serious than "showing the achievements of the USSR".

Steklyar died on 18 January 2018.

== Honours and awards ==
- Two Order of the Patriotic War First Class.
- Order of the Patriotic War Second Class.
- Order of the Red Banner
- Order of the Red Star
- Medal "For Courage"
- Medal "For Battle Merit"
- Medal "For the Capture of Berlin"
- «Honored veteran of Ukraine» — mention of the Organization of Veterans of Ukraine.

== Books ==
- Чекисты рассказывают ... Книга 6 / Т. Гладков, Б. Стекляр. Рассказы полковника Бондаря. — С. 121—178. — Москва : Советская Россия, 1985. — 272 с. (in Russian)
- Со щитом и мечом : очерки и статьи. — Львов : Каменяр, 1988. — 203,[2] с. — ISBN 5-7745-0107-8 (in Russian)
- Ніл Хасевич — провідник Зот // Dmytro Vyedyenyeyev, Serhii Shevchenko Ukrainian Solovki. — Київ : ЕксОб, 2001. — С. 191—199. — ISBN 966-7769-06-2 (in Ukrainian)
