= Ardasan =

Ardasan Ардасан
- Settlement
- Location within Republic of Buryatia Location within Russia
- Coordinates: 51°26′N 106°34′E
- Country: Russia
- Region: Republic of Buryatia
- District: Selenginsky District
- Time zone: UTC+8:00

Ardasan (Russian: Ардасан) is a rural locality (a settlement) in Selenginsky District, Republic of Buryatia, Russia. The population was 163 as of 2010. There are 4 streets.

== Geography ==
Ardasan is located 25 km north of Gusinoozyorsk (the district's administrative centre) by road. Yagodnoye is the nearest rural locality.
