= Yenhor =

Yenhor Енхор
- Ulus
- Location within Republic of Buryatia Location within Russia
- Coordinates: 50°59′N 106°29′E
- Country: Russia
- Region: Republic of Buryatia
- District: Selenginsky District
- Time zone: UTC+8:00

Yenhor (Russian: Енхор; Buryat: Ёнхор, Yonkhor) is a rural locality (an ulus) in Selenginsky District, Republic of Buryatia, Russia. The population was 195 as of 2010. There are 8 streets.

== Geography ==
Yenhor is located 51 km south of Gusinoozyorsk (the district's administrative centre) by road. Novoselenginsk is the nearest rural locality.
