= 168th Brigade =

168th Brigade may refer to:

== Russia ==
- 168th Motor Rifle Brigade

== United Kingdom ==
- 168th (2nd London) Brigade
- 168th (Huddersfield) Brigade, Royal Field Artillery

== United States ==
- 168th Engineer Brigade

== See also ==
- 168th Brigade Support Battalion, United States
- 168th Regiment (disambiguation)
