= Shana, Republic of Buryatia =

Shana Шана
- Ulus
- Location within Republic of Buryatia Location within Russia
- Coordinates: 50°55′N 106°12′E
- Country: Russia
- Region: Republic of Buryatia
- District: Selenginsky District
- Time zone: UTC+8:00

Shana (Russian: Шана; Buryat: Шанаа, Shanaa) is a rural locality (an ulus) in Selenginsky District, Republic of Buryatia, Russia. The population was 267 as of 2010. There are 5 streets.

== Geography ==
Shana is located 53 km southwest of Gusinoozyorsk (the district's administrative centre) by road. Selenduma is the nearest rural locality.
