= Tokhoy, Selenginsky District, Republic of Buryatia =

Tokhoy Тохой
- Ulus
- Location within Republic of Buryatia Location within Russia
- Coordinates: 51°22′N 106°36′E
- Country: Russia
- Region: Republic of Buryatia
- District: Selenginsky District
- Time zone: UTC+8:00

Tokhoy (Russian: Тохой) is a rural locality (an ulus) in Selenginsky District, Republic of Buryatia, Russia. The population was 2,819 as of 2010. There are 68 streets.

== Geography ==
Tokhoy is located 13 km northeast of Gusinoozyorsk (the district's administrative centre) by road. Zhargalanta is the nearest rural locality.
