= Yekhe-Tsagan =

Yekhe-Tsagan Ехэ-Цаган
- Ulus
- Location within Republic of Buryatia Location within Russia
- Coordinates: 51°00′N 106°20′E
- Country: Russia
- Region: Republic of Buryatia
- District: Selenginsky District
- Time zone: UTC+8:00

Yekhe-Tsagan (Russian: Ехэ-Цаган; Buryat: Ехэ Сагаан, Yekhe Sagaan) is a rural locality (an ulus) in Selenginsky District, Republic of Buryatia, Russia. The population was 399 as of 2010. There are 6 streets.

== Geography ==
Yekhe-Tsagan is located 41 km southwest of Gusinoozyorsk (the district's administrative centre) by road. 5818-y km is the nearest rural locality.
