= 198th Regiment =

198th Regiment may refer to:

- 198th Alexander Nevsky Infantry Regiment, Russian Imperial Army
- 198th Pennsylvania Infantry Regiment, Union Army

== See also ==
- 198th Signal Battalion, United States
- 198th Division (disambiguation)
- 198th (disambiguation)
