= Deben, Selenginsky District, Republic of Buryatia =

Deben Дэбэн
- Ulus
- Location within Republic of Buryatia Location within Russia
- Coordinates: 50°44′N 106°18′E
- Country: Russia
- Region: Republic of Buryatia
- District: Selenginsky District
- Time zone: UTC+8:00

Deben (Russian: Дэбэн) is a rural locality (an ulus) in Selenginsky District, Republic of Buryatia, Russia. The population was 158 as of 2010. There are 2 streets.

== Geography ==
Deben is located 81 km south of Gusinoozyorsk (the district's administrative centre) by road. Nur-Tukhum is the nearest rural locality.
