= Cross of Military Merit (Ukraine) =

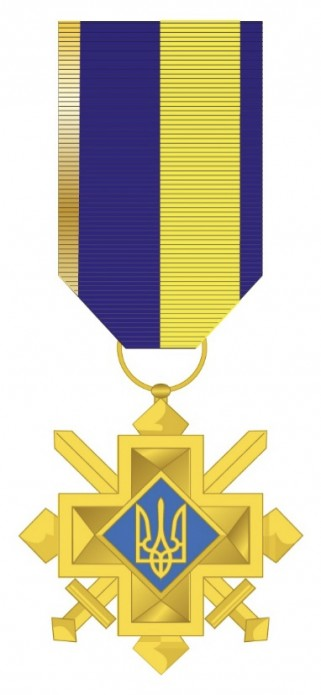
- Type: Cross
- Awarded for: Outstanding personal bravery and courage or an outstanding heroic act while performing a combat mission in conditions of danger to life and direct contact with the enemy; outstanding success in the management of troops (forces) during military (combat) operations
- Presented by: Ukraine
- Eligibility: Citizens of Ukraine, foreigners and stateless persons
- Established: 5 May 2022

Precedence
- Next (higher): "Order of the Golden Star" and "Order of the State" the title of Hero of Ukraine
- Next (lower): Order of Liberty

The Cross of Military Merit (Ukrainian: Хрест бойових заслуг, Khrest boiovykh zasluh – literally: 'Cross of merits in combat') is a state award of Ukraine, a distinction of the President of Ukraine established to recognize servicemen of the Armed Forces of Ukraine and other military formations formed in accordance with the laws of Ukraine for outstanding personal bravery and courage or an outstanding heroic act during a combat mission in conditions of danger to life and direct contact with the enemy; outstanding success in commanding troops (forces) during military (combat) operations.

The designer of the decoration is Oleksandr Liezhniev.

== Award history ==
The design of the award is based on the historical Cross of Combat Merit of the Ukrainian Insurgent Army and the Ukrainian Supreme Liberation Council, but the ribbon has the colors of the modern Ukrainian flag, not the UPA flag, and the swords are pointed upwards as a sign of victory. The UPA awards were introduced by the order of the UPA General Staff (part 3/44 of January 27, 1944), but their visualization was not available until April 1950." The award design was developed by UPA artist Nil Khasevych.

The Cross of Military Merit award of the President of Ukraine was established by the Decree of the President of Ukraine Volodymyr Zelenskyy on 5 May 2022.

On 6 May 2022, Volodymyr Zelenskyy presented the first military awards of independent Ukraine - the Cross of Military Merit. The first recipient of the Cross of Military Merit was the Commander-in-Chief of the Armed Forces of Ukraine, General Valerii Zaluzhnyi, who, since the beginning of Russia's armed aggression, has successfully organized the defense of the state and personally led the Armed Forces' heroic resistance to the invasion.

On 21 December 2022, during a visit to the United States, President of Ukraine Volodymyr Zelenskyy, at the request of Ukrainian soldier Pavlo Cherniavskyi, who was awarded the Military Cross, handed over the award attributes of his decoration to US President Joe Biden in gratitude for the invaluable support of Ukraine and the contribution made by the United States to strengthening Ukraine's defense capabilities.
