= Mykola Mishakin =

Ukrainian serviceman (born 1982)

- Микола Мішакін

Military service
- Allegiance: Ukraine
- Branch/service: National Guard of Ukraine
- Rank: Colonel
- Battles/wars: Russo-Ukrainian War
- Awards: Cross of Military Merit; Order For Courage; Order of Danylo Halytskyi

Mykola Mykolaiovych Mishakin (Ukrainian: Микола Миколайович Мішакін) is a Ukrainian serviceman, colonel of the 1st Operational Brigade of the National Guard of Ukraine, a participant in the Russian-Ukrainian war.

== Biography ==
He graduated from Kryvyi Rih boarding school with enhanced military and physical training, Kharkiv Institute of Tank Troops, National Defense University of Ukraine (operational and tactical level).

He served as the commander of a separate special forces detachment "Omega", deputy commander of the 4th Operational Brigade.

Currently, he is the commander of the 1st Presidential Operational Brigade.

With the beginning of the full-scale Russian invasion of Ukraine, Colonel Mykola Mishakin successfully performed combat missions to prevent the breakthrough of Russian troops in the Kyiv Oblast. As a result, more than 10 units of armored vehicles and a large number of Russian occupants were destroyed. During the fighting in Luhansk Oblast, his actions evacuated and saved the lives of about 25 families. He took an active part in the battles in the Sievierodonetsk sector.

== Awards ==
- Cross of Military Merit (27 July 2022)
- Order For Courage, 3rd class (10 March 2022)
- Order of Danylo Halytskyi (25 March 2016)
