= Nil Khasevych =

Ukrainian artist and political figure

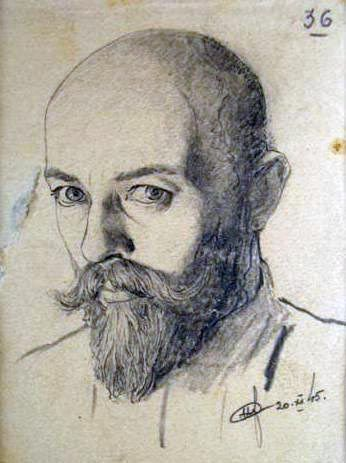
- Self-portrait by Khasevych
- Born: Nil Antonovych Khasevych; November 25, 1905; Dyuksyn village, Kostopil Raion, Rivne Oblast — March 4, 1952
- Died: March 4, 1952 (aged 46); Suhivtsi (Rivne region) village, Rivne Raion, Rivne Oblast
- Years active: 1925–1952
- Known for: Painting, woodcut, graphics, engraving

Nil Antonovych Khasevych (Ukrainian: Ніл Антонович Хасе́вич; 25 November 1905 - 4 March 1952) was a Ukrainian painter, graphic artist, and active public and political figure, member of the OUN and the UHVR. He was also a knight of the Silver Cross of Merit and the Medal "For the fight in especially difficult circumstances". Many of his most famous works depict the Ukrainian Insurgent Army in their struggles against Nazi Germany and the Soviet Union. He died during a Soviet raid "to suppress the anti-Soviet activities" of Khasevych. His pseudonyms are Bey-Zot, Levko, Rybalka, 333, Staryi, and Dzhmil.

== Biography ==
=== Childhood and youth ===
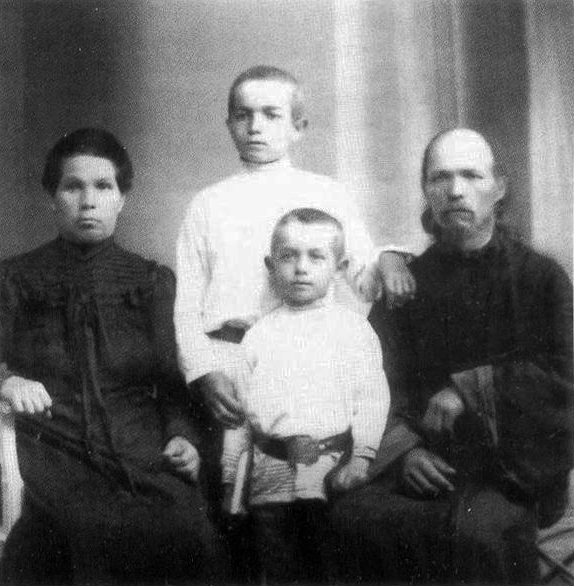
Family of Khasevych (from left): Theodotia Khasevych, Fedir Khasevych, Nil Khasevych and Anton Khasevych. 1910s

Nil Khasevych was born November 25 (November 12 Old Style) 1905 in the village Dyuksyn in Volhynia, now Kostopil Raion, Rivne Oblast, Ukraine, in a family of Psalomnyk Anton Ivanovych Khasevych and his wife Theodotia Oleksiivna. The village, according to the old administrative divisions, was Rivne district, Volhynian Governorate, Russian Empire. His brothers Anatoly and Fedir also become priests. Nil also studied at seminary. Besides his talent for drawing, Khasevych also had a good voice. In 1918, returning from Rivne, at the Derazhniansky railway crossing, he and his mother fell under a train. His mother died, and he lost a leg. As Nil could cut a variety of wood crafts, he had fashioned his own prosthetic leg.

=== Education and creativity ===
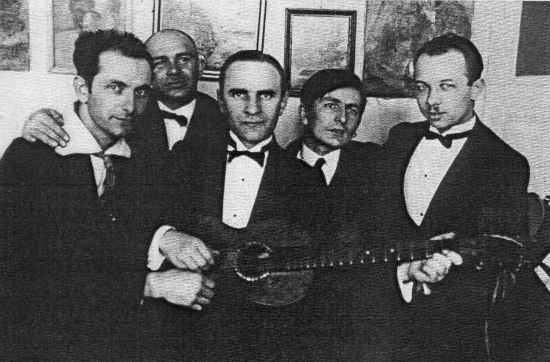
With friends in the Warsaw studios. 1930s

After treatment, he attended a workshop of Vasyl Len in Rivne. In 1925, he took an external exam and received a certificate of the Rivne Gymnasium. From 1925 to 1926, he worked as an assistant iconographer. With the money received as compensation for the accident, he used it to study at the Warsaw Academy of Fine Arts. The young man graduated from the graphics department, he studied painting with Professors Miłosz Kotarbiński and Mieczysław Kotarbiński, and graphics with Professor Władysław Skoczylas.

In Warsaw, he then worked with a small circle of Ukrainian artists and students in the academy, who founded the Society Calm (circle), which included N. Khasevych, P. Andrusiy, V. Vaskivskyy, S. Drychyk, V. Zvarych, Petro Holodny, V. Havryliuk and Petro Mehyk. From memories of the last about his countryman:

"... невеличкого зросту, бідно вдягнений хлопчина, з палицею в руці, бо замість лівої ноги — дерев'яна, закінчена грубим патиком, примітивна, власної роботи протеза... Пильно вчиться і неймовірно матеріально бідує. З дому від батька не одержує нічого, бо там не менша біда...".
"... small stature, poorly dressed boy with a stick in hand, because instead of left foot — wooden stick over a rough, primitive, self-scrutiny of denture learn ... and incredibly financially trouble. From the house of the father does not get anything, because there is non less trouble...".

In 1930 he belonged to the student union Zaporizhzhya. Defending a diploma work on the theme Saint Volodymyr, in 1935, Nil received a diploma of higher art education with the right of teaching in secondary schools. With the beginning of World War II he returned to his village. But even in 1931 his painting Laundry was awarded with the Vatican prize, and the next year, his portrait of Hetman Ivan Mazepa won the Warsaw Academy diploma.

Reflecting on the specifics of art, Nil Khasevych made a record on February 24, 1933:

"Малюнок є правдою абсолютною, а мову правди треба вчити скрізь і завжди... Це єдина мова, якою можна висловити все".
"Drawing is the absolute truth, and the truth must be taught the language everywhere and always... the only language that can express all".

To study this language, Nil Khasevych copied by hand with quill pen the Peresopnytsia Gospel. In the process he mastered the Cyrillic font. Gradually moving from oil painting to graphics prints, he begins to engage engravings, and woodcutting (derevorizamy). In the early 1930s, Nil Khasevych exhibited his work in art salons of Lviv, Prague, Berlin, Chicago, Los Angeles. In 1937, he got a third cash prize at the International Exhibition of Engravings on a wood engraving in Warsaw. For two years, he printed an art album called Book marks of Nil Khasevych. This year, in the American city of Philadelphia, his art album, Ex libris of Nil Khasevych, was released. Nil collaborated with the Ukrainian magazine The Way and Volyn word. The artist tirelessly polished professional skills. His portraits of Prince Volodymyr the Great, bookplate of the president of UNR in exile Andriy Livytskyi, and the series of works in the anthology Woodcuts was highly appreciated by experts. He is compared to Ivan Trush, Heorhiy Narbut, and Vasyl Krychevsky.

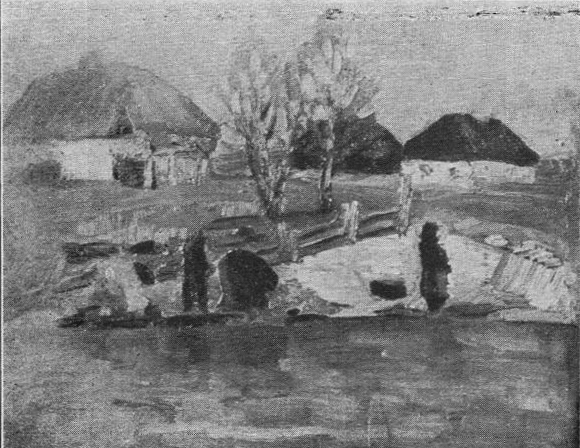
Volhynia. Canvas, oil. 1920s

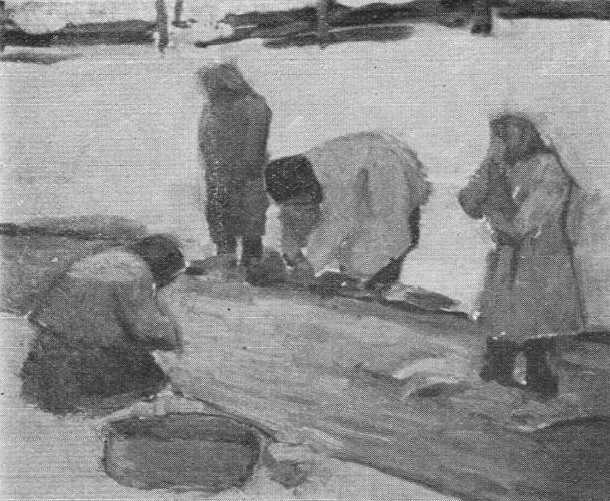
Laundry. Canvas, oil. 1920s

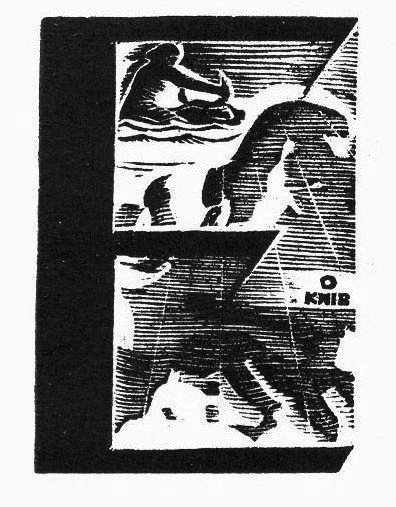
Initial "E". Woodcut. 1930s

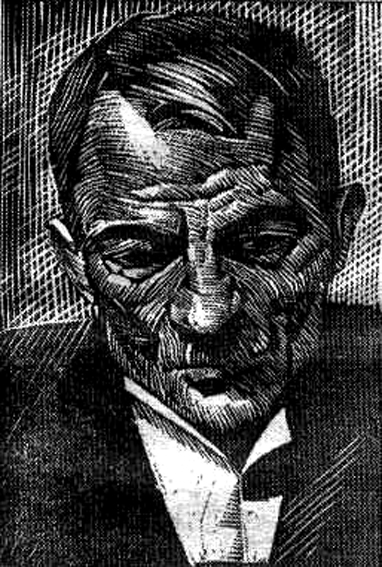
Portrait. Woodcut. 1930s

=== Activity in the OUN ===
Khasevych was a successful artist and could easily live with the Crosses of Merit. Nil Khasevych was an active public and political figure, and a member of the Volhynia Ukrainian association (VUO) from 1935. He was a delegate to the Regional Congress of the VUO in 1935 in Lutsk. He was personally acquainted with Stepan Bandera and other Ukrainian leaders of the national movement. He was a member of the central and regional OUN leadership, and later, he joined the Ukrainian Supreme Liberation Council (UHVR). But the impending world war and the fate put him a choice. Along with the work, he is engaged in social and political activities: he took part in the Volhynia Ukrainian association, and later joined the OUN. Since April 1943, when groups of the UPA were formed in mass, he joined the underground work. He was elected to the central and regional leadership of the OUN. From that time, he began a nomadic life. He worked in the Kriivka, and constantly changed his location because of the constant danger. He was known by the pseudonyms Bay-Zot, Levko, Rybalka, 333, Stary, and Dzhmil. Nil Antonovych was a talented propagandist who led an insurgency printing house. He also worked as an artist and editor, preparing illustrations for satirical magazines of the UPA "Ukrainian pepper" and "Horseradish", designed the pappus and leaflets for underground publication, and released an album of caricatures. He also worked on projects of flags, seals, forms for insurgents. During 1943 — 1944, he led a political-propagandist unit of the UP "North" group, commanded by Klym Savur (real name Dmytro Klyachkivskyy). After the death of his friend and leader, Khasevych remained on combat post for another seven years. His portfolio of the war and post-war era — 150 woodcuts, which was issued overseas in albums as "Volhynia in the fight" and "Graphics in UPA bunkers" during 1950 — 1952.

In 1941, he became a member of the Labor Union of Lviv, Ukrainian Fine Arts and worked with the Rivne Magazine "Volhynia" with Ulas Samchuk. In Nazi-occupied Lviv in 1942 — 1943, he held an exhibition of Ukrainian artists in which Nil Khasevych exhibited the work of patriotic themes, including "Sleep, guys, sleep".

In June 1948, the Ukrainian Supreme Liberation Council (UHVR) introduced awards for illegals, which earned them with a personal courage. In particular, "Zot" created sketches of the Cross of Merit and Cross of Combat Merit and medal "For the fight in especially difficult circumstances." Subsequently, the author was awarded the Silver Cross of Merit and Medal and elected to UHVR from Ukrainian intelligentsia. Few know about who he really was, what he was doing and where he was. He was carried from hiding place to hiding place by bicycle.

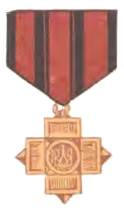
Crosses of Merit, project No. 1

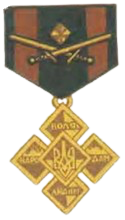
Crosses of Merit, project No. 2

=== Death ===
In 1951 an order came from the capital of Soviet Union "to suppress the anti-Soviet activities" (Russian: пресечь антисоветскую деятельность) of Khasevych, because the engraving was presented to the delegates of the United Nations General Assembly and to foreign diplomats, and then was published in the aforementioned book "Graphics in UPA bunkers". To search for the artist, the authorities established an inter-oblast task force, led by GB (Russian: ГБ (государственная безопасность), lit. 'State Security') Captain Borys Steklyar. It also included, as captain, Markelov, and Kudrytskyi. Secret police picked up the trail of "Zot" several times - once, in Lviv, through "citizen M", who hid in his place a personal archive of Nil Khasevych. He hid them in a glass jar and buried in the garden. "Organs" tried to lure and capture him, but to no avail. Later, in one of the captured bunkers, they found an encrypted document. When deciphered, it read:

Ukrainian: "Заготували для Вас 5 кілограмів паперу, вишневе дерево", romanized: Prepared for you 5 kilograms of paper and cherry wood

(from which printing cliches for producing cards and prints were made). The decryption pointed to an address: a bunker on a farm near village Suhivtsi (Rivne region) (then Rivne Raion, Rivne Oblast, Ukrainian SSR, Soviet Union) - 12 km from the town of Klevan, in Rivne Oblast. The farm was surrounded.

The bunker (Ukrainian: криївка, romanized: kryyivka) was equipped for homesteading, with the hidden entrance to the cave located in a barn near the wood. The bunker itself was relatively spacious, had three-quarters. Here there took place last fight of Khasevych and the two rebels who guarded him against the gebists (Russian: гэбисти, lit. 'state security operatives'). Teodor Gladkov's book, With shield and sword (Russian: Со щитом и мечом), published in 1988 in Lviv by the Kameniar publishing house, gives details of the death of the warrior-artist:

"Виходьте! Інакше закидаємо гранатами!" — крикнув Стекляр. Відповіддю було мовчання. Отже, переговори не відбулися. Чекіст витягнув із сумки гранату РГД і шепнув командиру відділення... Сержант точно, на півметра, не вище, підняв важку затичку... Цього вистачило, щоб метнути в лаз гранату. Глухо прогримів під ногами вибух... Почекавши трохи, капітан дав сигнал солдатам підняти затичку і знову вигукнув: "Хто живий — виходьте! Інакше пустимо гранати в хід!" Ніхто не вийшов... Живих у бункері не виявилося. При світлі акумуляторного ліхтаря Стекляр побачив три трупи. В одного відсутня нога — це був "Зот". У руці... стискав автомат.
"Come out! Otherwise, we will throw grenades! " — shouted Steklyar. The response was silence. Thus, the negotiations failed. The Chekist pulled from the bag an RGD grenade and whispered to the squad commander... The Sergeant lifted the heavy lyadu just for half a meter, not higher... It was enough to throw a grenade in the hole. A muffled explosion rocked underfoot... After waiting a bit, the captain gave a signal to the soldiers to lift the gag again and shouted in a commanding manner: "Whoever is alive — get out! Otherwise we will release a series of grenades." No one came out... There was nobody left alive in the bunker. In the light of the lantern battery Steklyar saw three bodies. One was without feet — it was Zot. ... clutching a machine gun in his hand.

According to another text, Nil Khasevych shot himself with his personal weapons, along with his two bodyguards — Vyacheslav Antoniuk — "Matthew" and Anton Melnychuk — "Hnat", burning all important documents beforehand.

From the memoirs of Dmytro Udod, a former UPA soldier:

"Це було 1952 року в Клевані, колишньому райцентрі на Рівненщині, до якого входили Білівські хутори, де в криївці був убитий Ніл. Їх, повстанців, привезли напівголими, звалили на сніг. Посадили в рядок. Його посадили під дубом. Чекісти привозили завжди вбитих для показу людям. Це робилося і на глум, і на пострах населення, щоб деморалізувати його... Коли вже енкаведистам набридало видовище, вони вивозили трупи в окописька. Десь там і тіло Ніла Хасевича знайшло свій останній притулок".
"It was 1952 in Klevan, a former district center in Rivne region, which included small Bilivski villages, where Nil was killed in a kryyivka. They, the insurgents, were carried up half-naked, and piled on the snow. They put them in a line. He was put under an oak. Security officers always brought the dead to show to people. This was done both as a taunt and as a horror of the population to demoralize them... When the NKVD guysgot tired of that sight, they took out the corpses in an entrenchment. Somewhere there the body of Nil Khasevych too found its final resting".

After three days the rebels' dead bodies were taken to an unknown destination. Julius Holovatsky, Ukrainian writer, member of the national liberation movement for the independence of Ukraine and political prisoner, wrote an essay, "Barrel", in 1956, which was published in parts throughout 1996 — 1998, which also described the death of Nil Khasevych:

"Щойно на другий день добралися до мертвих повстанців; їх прив'язували мертвих до шнура-ужища і по одному діставали з криївки на поверхню. Тіла убитих були не пошматовані; конструкцією криївки був передбачений сховок на випадок, коли криївку закидатимуть гранатами. В кожного з хлопців на голові були сліди від куль — вони пострілялися самі. Так загинули "Зот", а з ним — ще два його друзі по боротьбі".
"Once on the second day we got to the dead rebels; their dead corpses were tied to a cord-uzhyscha and fetched one by one from the kryivka to the surface. The bodies of those killed were not torn; the kryivka structure was predicted to be kept in a case where it would be attacked by grenades. Each of the guys had on his head traces of bullets — they had shot themselves. Thus died "Zot", and with him — two of his combat-friends".

== Family ==
World War II decimated virtually all his relatives: his father and his younger brother, Anatoly were killed, and his older brother, Fedir died in a Soviet concentration camp, Beloborodovo, near Tomsk.

In 1947, his wife died, who was a liaison in the Lutsk resistance. There are left her portraits, painted in April 1945.

== Exhibitions ==
During 1931–1944 participant of art exhibitions, including:

- 1931–1932 — exhibitions in Lviv, Prague, Berlin.
- 1932–1933 — exhibitions in Chicago and Los Angeles.

== Albums ==
- Book marks of Nil Khasevych. — Warsaw, 1939.
- Ex libris of Nil Khasevych. — Philadelphia, 1939.
- Графіка в бункрах УПА. Альбом дереворитів виконаних в Україні в роках 1947—1950 мистця українського підпілля Ніла Хасевича—"Бей-Зота" та його учнів. — Филаделфія, 1952. (in Ukrainian)
- Nil Khasevych (1905–1952). Album. — Lviv, 2010.

== Honors and awards ==
In 1931 Nil Khasevych was awarded the honorary award "Vatican" for the painting "Laundry", and in 1932, he was awarded an Honorary Diploma of the Warsaw Academy of Fine Arts for a portrait "Mazepa".

In 1948 UHVR awarded him with the Silver Cross of Merit and the Medal "For the fight in especially difficult circumstances".

== Memory ==
Nil Khasevych devoted his life to Ukraine. He never thought of himself, and never asked anything for himself. UHVR offered him to cross to the West, but he refused. Where is his grave is, is unknown.

There are Nil Khasevych Street in Kostopil, Lviv, Lutsk, Rivne, Kovel, Volodymyr-Volynskyi and Pervomaisk of Mykolaiv Oblast.

In 1992, on the death spot of Nil Khasevych, in Suhsvtsy of Rivne Raion, a memorial sign was installed by the artist Valeriy Voytovych.

Also, there is a monument to the Nil Khasevych in Rivne on Directory Street.

The SBU in Volyn Oblast, in the early 1990s, gave a selection of original woodcuts of Nil Khasevych preserved in the archives to a regional ethnographic museum in Lutsk.

And December 26, 2008, the Security Service of Ukraine transferred to permanent storage at the memorial complex The National Museum of Ukraine in World War II 103 original prints of Nil Khasevych and wooden printing blocks for their production, which remained in the storages of the KGB.

The fate of the Nil Khasevych was filmed in the movie "Gain or not to be" (writer, director Mykhailo Tkachuk).

The official website of Kostopolsky RDA offers two tours related to the life and work of Nil Khasevych — "Nil Khasevych — artist-fighter" (introduces the birthplace of graphic artist) and "Ways of Ukrainian Insurgent Army" (introduces the rebel movement in Kostopil region, including his native village).

Resolution No. 184-VIII of the Verkhovna Rada of Ukraine from February 11, 2015, set the celebration of 110 years since the birth of graphic artist at the state level.

In Rivne region, the Award of Nil Khasevych was established. The first winner of it (in 2016) was painter and graphic artist Yevhen Chorny.

== Quote ==
"Я не можу битися зброєю, але б'юся різцем і долотом. Я, каліка, б'юся в той час, коли багато сильних і здорових людей в світі навіть не вірять, що така боротьба взагалі можлива... Я хочу, щоб світ знав, що визвольна боротьба триває, що українці б'ються."
"I can not fight with weapon, but I fight by cutter and chisel. I am a cripple, fight at a time when many strong and healthy people in the world do not even believe that this fight is possible at all... I want the world to know that the liberation struggle continues, that Ukrainians are fighting."

— wrote the artist Nil Khasevych a year before his death

== Works of Nil Khasevych ==
- Ukrainian Underground Art
- Ніл Хасевич. Найживіша галузь мистецтва. Твори. — Рівне, Азалія, 2009. (in Ukrainian)
- Галерея мистецтв — Хасевич Ніл (in Ukrainian)
- "Український перець", Листопад 1943 (in Ukrainian)
- "Український перець", Вересень 1944 (in Ukrainian)
- "Український перець", Березень 1945 (in Ukrainian)
- Агітація і пропаганда УПА: плакати, листівки та облігації (Ніл Хасевич) (in Ukrainian)
- Гроші УПА — графічні шедеври Ніла Хасевича. (in Ukrainian)

== Articles about Nil Khasevych ==
- Ніл Хасевич. Людина, яка створила візуальний образ УПА (in Ukrainian)
- За повстанським художником Нілом Хасевичем радянські спецслужби полювали до березня 1952–го (in Ukrainian)
- Сергій Гупало. Головний художник УПА (in Ukrainian)
- Сергій Гупало. Лицар свободи (in Ukrainian)
- Ігор Островський . Півтисячі кроків (in Ukrainian)
- Графіка з бункера (in Ukrainian)
- Сергій Шевченко, Дмитро Вєдєнєєв. Розвідник "Ярема" і підпільник "Зот" (in Ukrainian)
- Василь Черняк. "Я б'юся різцем і долотом" (in Ukrainian)

== Posthumous development ==
Borys Yukhymovych Steklyar (KGB colonel, in 1976 he retired from the post of Head of Department of the KGB of USSR in Rivne region then led the "Intourist" in Rivne region, Rivne branch chairman of the public association "Union of veterans of Ukraine"), involved in the deaths of many of the rebels, even in 2016, is an influential figure in the SBU.

In an interview with Russian media said, in particular:

"Я робив праве діло... Ті, хто залишився у живих з бандерівців, — наша біда".
"I did the right thing... Those who stayed alive from Banderites, — our misfortune".

Also a lawsuit was filed to prohibit disclosing his personal file as an NKVD and KGB officer and documents testifying to his participation in the elimination of UPA soldiers.

== See also ==
- Martyrology of OUN and UPA figures

== Literature ==
- Дмитрієнко М. Хасевич Ніл Антонович // Енциклопедія історії України : у 10 т. / редкол.: В. А. Смолій (голова) та ін.; Інститут історії України НАН України. — К. : Наук. думка, 2013. — Т. 10 : Т — Я. — С. 362–363. — ISBN 978-966-00-1359-9. (in Ukrainian)
- Енциклопедія українознавства : Словникова частина : [в 11 т.] / Наукове товариство імені Шевченка; гол. ред. проф., д-р Володимир Кубійович. — Париж; Нью-Йорк : Молоде життя; Львів; Київ : Глобус, 1955–2003. (in Ukrainian)
- Малімон Н. Ніл Хасевич — повернення по-луцьки // Віче. — 2011. — 26 травн. — С. 3, 10. (in Ukrainian)
- Ніл Хасевич (1905—1952 рр.): альбом / Упорядн. та авт. тексту Богуслав Любів. — Львів : Панорама, 2010. (in Ukrainian)
- Ніл Хасевич. Воїн. Митець. Легенда: ілюстрований альбом / Упорядн. та авт. тексту Андрій Криштальський. — Луцьк : ВМА "Терен", 2011. — 100 с. (in Ukrainian)
- Сердюк Валерій. Ніл Хасевич — художник і воїн // Урядовий кур'єр. — 2005. — 2 груд. (in Ukrainian)
- Ткачук М. Документальний фільм "Здобути або не бути", 1992. (in Ukrainian)
- Іван Андрусяк про Дмитра Туптала (святого Димитрія Ростовського), Григорія Квітку-Основ'яненка, Тараса Шевченка, Ніла Хасевича, Олексу Довбуша / І. Андрусяк. — К. : Грані-Т, 2008. — 96 с. — ("Життя видатних дітей"). — ISBN 978-966-2923-77-3. (in Ukrainian)
- Бычковская Л. Мы бросили внутрь бункера несколько гранат. Через некоторое время начали доставать оттуда тела и вещи... // Факты. — 2016. — No. 164 (4623) (28 сент.). — С. 12. (Суд да дело) (in Russian)
- Теодор Гладков. Со щитом и мечом. — Львів : Каменяр, 1988. (in Ukrainian)
- Ніл Хасевич — провідник Зот // Dmytro Vyedyenyeyev, Serhii Shevchenko Ukrainian Solovki. — Київ : ЕксОб, 2001. — С. 191—199. — ISBN 966-7769-06-2 (in Ukrainian)
