= Trotsenko =

Trotsenko is a surname. Notable people with the surname include:

- Roman Trotsenko (born 1970), Russian billionaire businessman
- Yefim Trotsenko (1901–1972), Soviet military leader
