= 198th Division =

198th Division may refer to:

- 198th Division (1st Formation) (People's Republic of China), 1949–1961
- 198th Division (2nd Formation) (People's Republic of China), 1969–1985
- 198th Infantry Division (Wehrmacht), Germany
- 198th Motor Rifle Division, Soviet Union
- 198th Rifle Division, Soviet Union

== See also ==
- List of military divisions by number
- 198th Brigade (disambiguation)
- 198th Regiment (disambiguation)
- 198th (disambiguation)
