= 198th Brigade =

198th Brigade may refer to:

- 198th (East Lancashire) Brigade, United Kingdom
- 198th Infantry Brigade (United States)

== See also ==
- 198th Division (disambiguation)
- 198th Regiment (disambiguation)
