= 140th Anti-Aircraft Missile Brigade =

140th Anti-Aircraft Missile Brigade (1973–present) 189th Anti-Aircraft Missile Regiment (1960s–1973) 66th Anti-Aircraft Artillery Division (1943–1960)
- Russian: 140-я зенитная ракетная Борисовская ордена Кутузова бригада
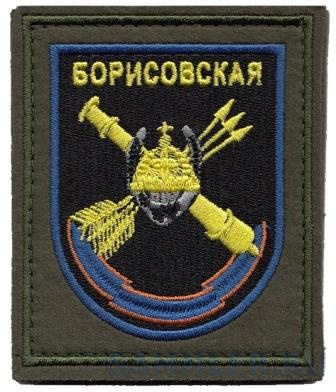
- Brigade shoulder sleeve insignia, 2010s
- Active: 1943–present
- Country: Soviet Union (1943–1991); Russia (1992–present)
- Branch: Soviet Army (1943–1991); Russian Ground Forces (1992–present)
- Type: Surface-to-air missile brigade
- Part of: 29th Army
- Garrison/HQ: Domna; MUN 32390
- Equipment: SA-11 Buk
- Engagements: World War II
- Decorations: Order of Kutuzov, 2nd class
- Battle honours: Borisov

Commanders
- Current commander: Colonel Alexey Kovynov

Insignia
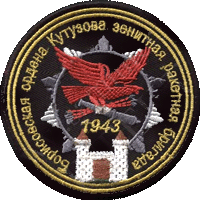
- 2000s brigade insignia

The 140th Borisov Order of Kutuzov Anti-Aircraft Missile Brigade (Russian: 140-я зенитная ракетная Борисовская ордена Кутузова бригада; Military Unit Number 32390) is an air defense brigade of the Russian Ground Forces' 29th Army in the Eastern Military District, stationed at Domna in Zabaykalsky Krai.

The brigade traces its lineage back to the formation of the 66th Anti-Aircraft Artillery Division (Russian: 66-я зенитная артиллерийская дивизия) in October 1943 during World War II. The division was sent to the front in early 1944, and fought in Operation Bagration, receiving the Borisov honorific for participating in the capture of that city. From November it fought in East Prussia, receiving the Order of Kutuzov 2nd class for its actions there at the end of the war. Postwar, the division was relocated to Kirovabad in Azerbaijan, where it remained until it was disbanded in 1960. The 189th Anti-Aircraft Artillery Regiment was formed from the division and soon became the 189th Anti-Aircraft Missile Regiment. In 1973 the regiment was expanded into the 140th Anti-Aircraft Missile Brigade, deploying to Trzebień in Poland as part of the Northern Group of Forces. After the end of the Cold War, the brigade was relocated from Poland to Chita Oblast, being stationed at Domna from 1994.

== World War II ==
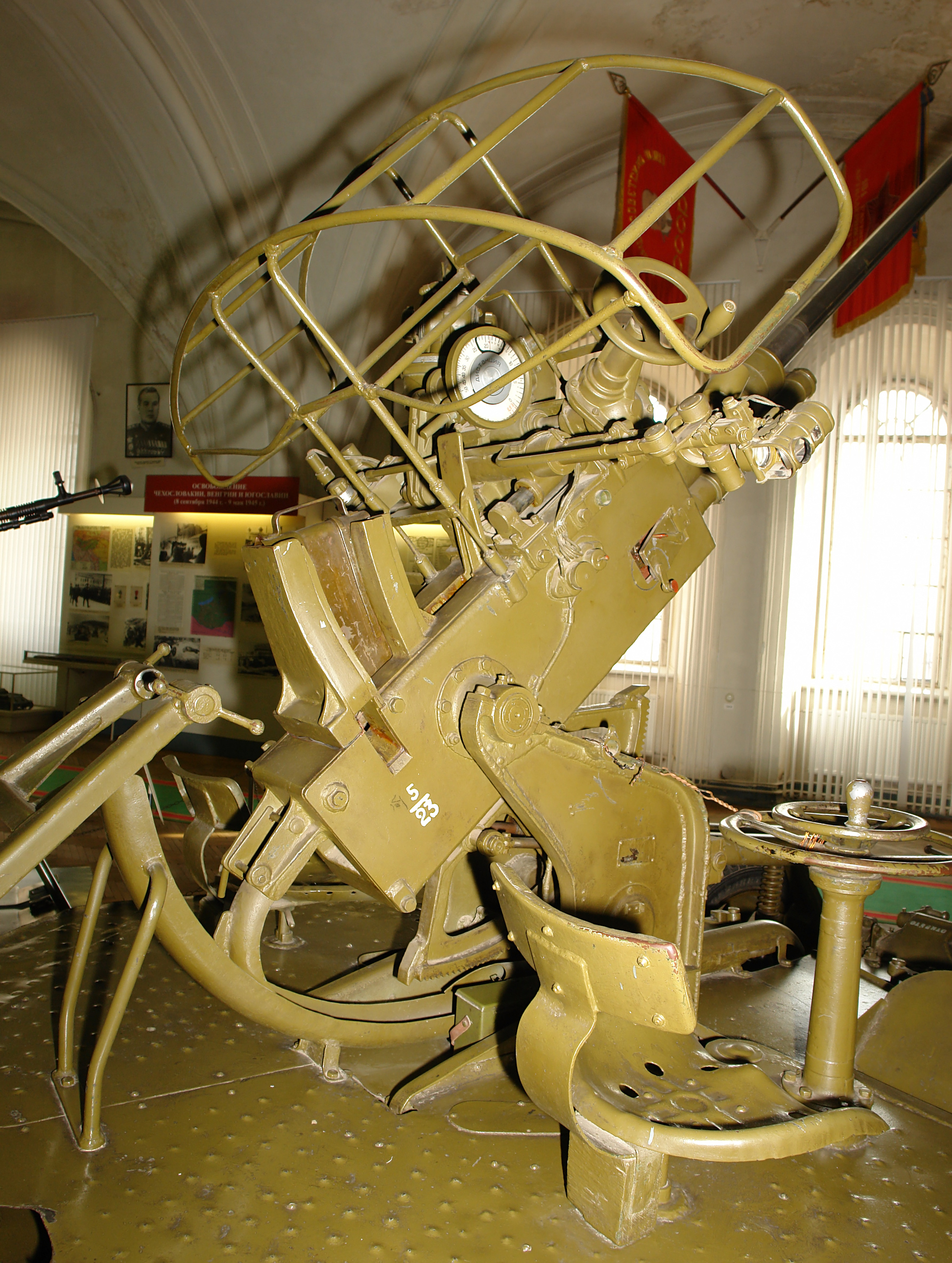
A 37 mm AA gun of the type used by the division during World War II

The 66th Anti-Aircraft Artillery Division began forming on 6 October 1943 at the Moscow Anti-Aircraft Artillery Training Camp in Pavshino, under the command of Colonel Ivan Korotkikh. It was part of the Moscow Military District, and included the 1981st, 1985th, 1989th, and the 1993rd Anti-Aircraft Artillery Regiments. The formation of the division ended on 1 November. In April 1944, Korotkikh became seriously ill with pneumonia and was sent to a hospital in Moscow for treatment. He was replaced by Major General Sergey Sazonov, who command it for the rest of the war.

In June, the division was relocated to the area of Smolensk and then Orsha, joining the 3rd Belorussian Front. It was operationally subordinated to the 31st Army, participating in the battles to capture Orsha, Minsk, Lida, and Suwałki during the year. The division covered the army in the crossing of the Neman in the area of Druskininkai and Bereshany. On 30 June, during Operation Bagration, the Soviet strategic offensive into western Belarus and eastern Poland, the division reached the Berezina River following a rapid advance by the 31st Army. After crossing the river on 1 July, the 66th fought in the capture of Borisov and was awarded the city's name as an honorific in recognition of its actions.

On 12 November, the division was operationally subordinated to the 11th Guards Army, fighting in the capture of Vilkaviškis and crossing the border of East Prussia near Eydtkuhnen. On 11 January 1945, the 66th was transferred to the operational subordination of the 2nd Guards Army, participating in the capture of Gumbinnen and Wartenstein. It was again transferred to the operational subordination of the 48th Army on 16 February, fighting in the capture of Shlobiten and then Braunsberg on 20 March in the Heiligenbeil Pocket. On 2 April, the 66th was withdrawn to the reserve of the front at Elbing. It was operationally subordinated to the 48th Army on 25 April in the Tolkemit area. For capturing Braunsberg, the 66th was awarded the Order of Kutuzov, 2nd class, on 26 April. Between 28 April and 8 May, it fought in the elimination of the German troops on the Vistula Spit and northwest of Elbing.

Between 16 June 1944 and 9 May 1945, a period of eleven months of combat, the division was credited with 38 German aircraft destroyed and one downed, killing 3,094 soldiers, 25 artillery and mortar batteries, 118 pillboxes, sixteen command posts, nine automobiles, and 63 wagons. Additionally, it captured 402 German soldiers.

== Postwar ==
On 18 June, the division was relocated by rail from Elbing to Minsk, in the area of Kodishi station, and became part of the Minsk Artillery Training Camp of the Minsk Military District. It was further relocated to Dagestan by 2 November, stationed in the area of Izberg and Dvigatelstroy as part of the reserve of the Transcaucasian Military District. The division transferred to the 4th Army at Alyat Pristan in 1946, and was moved to Kirovabad later that year. On 27 November 1948 the division received its battle flag. In accordance with a directive of 18 March 1960, the division was disbanded, and its personnel used to form a separate medium-caliber anti-aircraft artillery regiment, which later became the 189th Anti-Aircraft Missile Regiment.

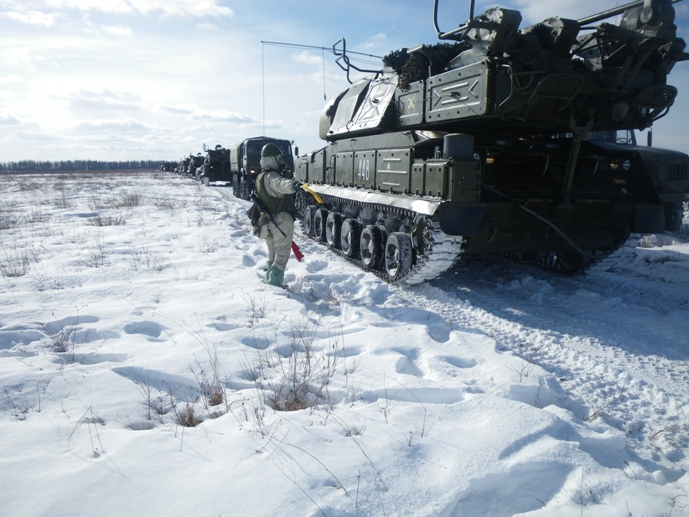
Vehicles of the brigade moving to the Telemba training range

Between 1 April and 1 August 1973, the 189th Anti-Aircraft Missile Regiment was reorganized into the 140th Anti-Aircraft Missile Brigade, inheriting the traditions of the regiment. In 1976, the brigade was relocated to Trzebień in Poland as part of the Northern Group of Forces, directly subordinated to the group headquarters. In 1992, after the end of the Cold War and the dissolution of the Soviet Union, the brigade became part of the Russian Ground Forces and was withdrawn from Poland to Drovyanaya in Chita Oblast, joining the 36th Army. In 1994 it was relocated to Domna. The brigade celebrates its anniversary on 6 October, the date of the formation of the 66th Division. Since 2010, it has been part of the 29th Army. The brigade includes three anti-aircraft Missile battalions with the Buk missile system.

== Commanders ==
The following officers have commanded the brigade and its predecessor units:

- Colonel Ivan Korotkikh (6 October 1943–c. 10 May 1944)
- Major General Sergey Sazonov (appointed 11 May 1944–October 1946)
- Colonel Viktor Okorokov (October 1946–July 1947)
- Colonel Pyotr Shelko (July 1947–before November 1951)
- Colonel M.A. Yegorov (1948–1952)
- Colonel N.A. Karandeyev (1954–1959)
- Colonel A.F. Kostenko (1959–1960)
- Colonel V.M. Polevichny (1960–1965)
- Lieutenant Colonel G.S. Machikhin (1965–1967)
- Colonel V.V. Kiselev (1967–1970)
- Colonel A.A. Leonov (1970–1972)
- Colonel A.V. Dianov (1972–1973)
- Lieutenant Colonel V.A. Shevtsov (1973–1976)
- Lieutenant Colonel Yu. A. Dorokhov (1976–1977)
- Colonel N.N. Gavrishchitsin (1977–1983)
- Colonel Ye. F. Frolov (1983–1985)
- Lieutenant Colonel V. Yu. Babayev (1985–1988)
- Colonel A.K. Serebryannikov (1988–1989)
- Colonel V.N. Tarakanov (1989–1992)
- Colonel V.G. Orlov (1992–1994)
- Colonel A.D. Volkov (1994–1995)
- Colonel V.I. Filippov (1995–1997)
- Colonel M.M. Belov (1997–1999)
- Colonel O.I. Belokopytov (1999–2000)
- Colonel P. Ye. Brykin (2000–2010)
- Colonel Alexey Kovynov (2013–present)
