= Valery Tretyakov (general) =

Soviet and Russian general

Valery Stepanovich Tretyakov
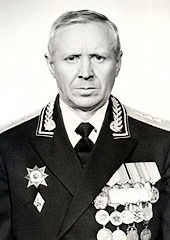
- Native name: Валерий Степанович Третьяков
- Born: 24 December 1941 (age 84); Syzran, RSFSR, USSR
- Allegiance: Soviet Union; Russia
- Branch: Soviet Army; Russian Ground Forces
- Service years: 1959-2001
- Rank: Colonel general
- Commands: 72nd Guards Motor Rifle Division 39th Army; Transbaikal Military District Military Academy of the General Staff of the Armed Forces of Russia
- Awards: Order of the Red Banner of Labor Order for Service to the Homeland in the Armed Forces of the USSR 3rd class Order of Military Merit

Valery Stepanovich Tretyakov (born 24 December 1941 in Syzran) is a retired Soviet and Russian Colonel general. The commander of the Transbaikal Military District (1991-1996), head of the Military Academy of the General Staff of the Armed Forces of the Russian Federation (1996-1999).

== Biography ==
He was born on 24 December 1941 in the city of Syzran, Kuibyshev Oblast.

He graduated from the Tashkent Military College Lenin with honors (1960-1963), the Frunze Military Academy with honors (1969-1972), the General Staff Academy of the Armed Forces named Voroshilov (1983-1985 ), higher academic courses at the Military Academy of the General Staff of the Armed Forces named Voroshilov (1991).

He served as a platoon commander, company commander, battalion chief of staff in the Turkestan Military District (1963-1969), Chief of Staff (1972-1975) and commander (1975-1977) 239th Motorized Rifle Regiment of the 21st Taganrog Motor Rifle Division in the Group of Soviet Forces in Germany, the Chief of Staff (1977-1979) and commander (1979-1983) 72nd Guards Motor Rifle Division Krasnogradsky in the Kiev Military District, Chief of Staff of the 29th Army (1985-1987) and the commander of the 39th Army in the Mongolian People Republic (1987-1988), 1st Deputy Commander (October 1988 - August 1991) and Commander (31 August 1991 - 17 July 1996) troops Transbaikal Military District, chief of the Military Academy of the General Staff of the Armed Forces (July 17, 1996 - August 8, 1999 ), at the disposal of the Minister of Defense of the Russian Federation (1999-2001).
