= 245th Motor Rifle Division =

Motor rifle division of the Soviet Ground Forces

- Active: 1967–1997; 2001–2006
- Country: Soviet Union; Russia
- Branch: Soviet Army; Russian Ground Forces
- Type: Infantry
- Size: Division
- Part of: 29th Army
- Garrison/HQ: Gusinoozyorsk

The 245th Motor Rifle Division (Russian: 245-я мотострелковая дивизия; Military Unit Number 46108) was a division of the Soviet Ground Forces and later the Russian Ground Forces, active from 1967 to 1997 and later from 2001 to 2006.

== History ==
On 31 August 1967 in the city of Kursk the 245th Motor Rifle Division was formed. The division consisted of the 39th, 153rd, and 376th Motor Rifle Regiments, the 507th Tank Regiment, the 820th Artillery Regiment, and an anti-aircraft rocket regiment of unknown designation which had fought in the Second World War. From 1971 the Division was deployed at Gusinoozyorsk in Buryatia, as part of the Siberian Military District.

To replace the 245th Motor Rifle Division at Kursk, the 196th Motor Rifle Division (Military Unit Number 52299, including the 595th MRR) was formed. On 1 December 1987 the 196th MRD became a territorial training centre (ТУЦ), and then on 25 January 1989 the centre was disbanded. The 255th 'Spare' MRD also existed in outline form under the 196th MRD in Kursk.

General-mayor Claudius Shestakov commanded the 245th MRD in 1976-78.

The 245th MRD was a part of the 29th Army, then the 57th Army Corps, and since 2003 a part of the 29th Army again. When the 205th Separate Motor Rifle Brigade of the North Caucasus Military District was formed, one of its battalions was formed on the basis of the 245th MRD, having absorbed personnel from all over the Transbaikal Military District.

On 1 September 1997, as part of the bilateral agreement between Russia and China on reductions of armaments covering the area up to 200 km from their mutual border, the 245th MRD was reduced to the 6803rd Weapons and Equipment Storage Base (BKhVT). The 245th MRD was reformed from 6803rd VKhVT in 2001, and given the 'Combat Banner' of the disbanded 2nd Guards Tank Division. The reformed division included the 39th and 376th Motor Rifle Regiments and the 507th Tank Regiment. The 363rd Motor Rifle Regiment joined the 122nd Guards Motor Rifle Division in the city of Aleysk, and the 376th Guards Motor Rifle Yassy-Mukden Order of the Red Banner Order of Kutuzov Regiment joined the division from the 122nd Guards MRD.

In 2004 160th Guards Tank Regiment joined the division from the 5th Guards Tank Division, and the 507th Tank Regiment joined the 5th Guards Tank Division in its place.

By 1 February 2006 245th Guards Motor Rifle Division was reorganised as 6th Guards Tatsinskaya (Тацинская) Order of the Red Banner Order of Suvorov Base for Storage of Weapons and Equipment (Motor-Rifle forces).

== Sources ==
- Soldat.ru forum, 6 Guards BXVT, Zhukov Andrey 6 гв бхвт (мсв) 27.02.2007 11:17
- Michael Holm, 245th Motorised Rifle Division, 2015
