= Ivan Gryaznov =

Soviet komkor (1891–1938)

- Born: 11 January 1891; Russian Empire
- Died: 29 July 1938 (aged 47); Moscow Oblast, Soviet Union
- Allegiance: Soviet Union
- Service / branch: Soviet Red Army
- Rank: Komkor

Ivan Kensorinovich Gryaznov (Russian: Иван Кенсоринович Грязнов; 1891 – 29 July 1938) was a Soviet Komkor. He was born in what is now Sverdlovsk Oblast. He was a recipient of the Order of the Red Banner. He was executed during the Great Purge.

Preceded by	Commander of the Transbaikal Military District; 1935–1937	Succeeded by Mikhail Velikanov
Preceded by Mikhail Velikanov	Commander of the Central Asian Military District; 1937	Succeeded by Aleksandr Loktionov

== Bibliography ==
- Алексеев Д. Г. Начдив Иван Грязнов. Свердловск, 1968.
- Варгин Н. Ф. Комкор Иван Грязнов. M, 1971,
- Cherushev, Nikolai Semyonovich; Cherushev, Yury Nikolaevich (2012). Расстрелянная элита РККА (командармы 1-го и 2-го рангов, комкоры, комдивы и им равные): 1937—1941. Биографический словарь [Executed Elite of the Red Army (Komandarms of the 1st and 2nd ranks, Komkors, Komdivs, and equivalents) 1937–1941 Biographical Dictionary] (in Russian). Moscow: Kuchkovo Pole. ISBN 9785995002178.
