= Pavlo Cherniavskyi =

Ukrainian military commander

- Павло Чернявський

Military service
- Allegiance: Ukraine
- Branch/service: Armed Forces
- Rank: Captain
- Battles/wars: Russo-Ukrainian War
- Awards: Command Coin

Pavlo Olehovych Cherniavskyi (Ukrainian: Павло Олегович Чернявський) is a Ukrainian soldier, a captain of the Armed Forces of Ukraine, a participant in the Russian-Ukrainian war.

== Biography ==
Commander of the Himars battery.

On 20 December 2022, an Armed Forces captain and Himars battery commander named Pavlo in Bakhmut handed over his award, the Cross of Military Merit, to Ukrainian president Volodymyr Zelenskyy to present to US President Joe Biden. The next day, Zelenskyy visited Washington and publicly presented Biden with the award.

Then the US president accepted the gift from the Ukrainian military with the words: "Well, it's undeserved, but I appreciate it". The head of the White House promised to give the Ukrainian captain a Command coin from the US battlefield in Iraq, where his son Beau fought.

On 28 December 2022, Volodymyr Zelenskyy, after a speech in the Verkhovna Rada of Ukraine, handed Captain Pavlo Cherniavskyi a "Command Coin" award from US President Joe Biden.

I have one debt from my visit to the United States that I want to repay right now. In this room is Captain Pavlo Cherniavskyi, commander of the Himars battery, who was awarded the Combat Action Cross and who presented this award to President Biden. It was an honor to fulfill this special mission. But there is a second part to it. In return, President Biden handed over a Command Coin, a special symbol from the President of the United States of America. Mr. Captain! Pavlo! I have to give this Command Coin to you now

— Volodymyr Zelenskyi, President of Ukraine,

== Awards ==
- Cross of Military Merit (19 December 2022)
- Order of Bohdan Khmelnytskyi, 2nd class (30 December 2022)
- Order of Bohdan Khmelnytskyi, 2nd class (14 March 2022)
- Command Coin (2022, from US President Joe Biden)
