= Cross of Merit (Ukrainian Insurgent Army) =

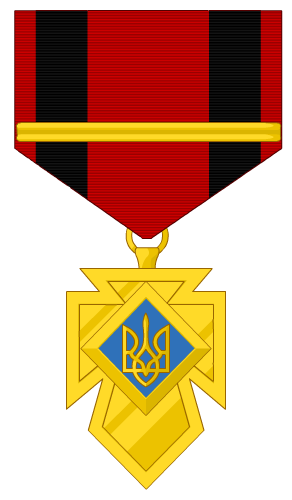
- Golden Cross
- Type: Military decoration
- Awarded for: Service in the Ukrainian Insurgent Army
- Presented by: Ukrainian Insurgent Army
- Status: Discontinued
- Established: January 27, 1944
- First award: April 22, 1945
- Final award: October 12, 1952
- Ribbon bar

Precedence
- Next (higher): Cross of Combat Merit
- Next (lower): no

The Cross of Merit (Ukrainian: Хрест Заслуги) was an award of Ukrainian Insurgent Army. It awarded for distinguished services to the state and people of the Ukrainian army. The Order was instituted on January 27, 1944, by the Ukrainian Supreme Liberation Council leaders, Roman Shukhevych and Dmytro Hrytsai.

The Order is awarded in three (golden, silver and bronze) grades and had a red ribbon with a black stripe on each edge.

== Description ==
	Golden Class	Silver Class	Bronze Class
Badges			
Ribbons			

== Knights ==
- Nil Khasevych
