= Yefim Trotsenko =

Yefim Grigoryevich Trotsenko
- Born: 27 March 1901; Yegorov, Russian Empire (now in Rostov Oblast, Russian Federation)
- Died: 25 January 1972 (aged 70); Moscow, Russian SFSR; Soviet Union
- Burial place: Novodevichy Cemetery
- Military career
- Allegiance: Soviet Russia (1918-1922); Soviet Union (1922-1965)
- Branch: Red Army / Soviet Army
- Service years: 1918–1965
- Rank: Colonel-general
- Commands: Transbaikal Military District (February 1952 - December 1956)
- Conflicts: Russian Civil War; Spanish Civil War; World War II

Yefim Grigoryevich Trotsenko (Russian: Ефим Григорьевич Троценко; 27 March 1901 [O.S. 14 March] – 25 January 1972) was a Soviet military leader.

== Biography ==
Born to a peasant family in the Don region of the Russian Empire on 27 March 1901, Yefim Trotsenko joined the Red Army in 1918, fought in the Russian Civil War, and joined the Russian Communist Party (b) in 1920. He subsequently graduated from the Krasnodar Commanders Courses in 1922 and the Vladikavkaz Infantry School in 1925, and the Frunze Military Academy in 1931. He was among the Soviet officers sent to assist the Second Spanish Republic during the Spanish Civil War.

Promoted to kombrig in 1938 and to komdiv in 1939, Trotsenko was made chief of staff to the 1st Separate Red Banner Army in the Soviet Far East in July 1939 and a major-general upon the introduction of the traditional general officer ranks into the Soviet military in 1940. He served as the chief of staff of the 2nd (Blagoveschensk) Red Banner Army in June - July 1940, but in July was given the more senior post of chief of staff for Lieutenant-General Mikhail Kovalyov's Transbaikal Military District (reorganized as the Transbaikal Front in 1941) until July 1945. He was promoted to the rank of lieutenant-general on 1 September 1943.

With post-war changes in organization, Trotsenko was appointed chief of staff for the Transbaikal-Amur Military District in September 1945. It was reorganized into the recreated Transbaikal Military District in 1947, with Trotsenko as first deputy commander until 1952 and commander from February 1952 until December 1956.

He was made colonel-general in 1954 and appointed first deputy chief of the Department of Personnel at the Ministry of Defense of the USSR in 1956, where he remained until retiring in 1965.

He died in Moscow on 25 January 1972 and was interred at the Novodevichy Cemetery.
