= 29th Guards Combined Arms Army =

Russian Ground Forces formation

- 29-я гвардейская общевойсковая армия
- Great emblem of the 29th Combined Arms Army
- Active: 1941–1943; 1968–1988; 2010–present
- Country: Soviet Union (to 1988); Russia (2010–present)
- Branch: Soviet Army (to 1988); Russian Ground Forces (2010–present)
- Type: Combined Arms
- Size: Field army
- Part of: Eastern Military District
- Garrison/HQ: Chita
- Engagements: World War II; Battle of Smolensk; Battle of Moscow; Battle of Rzhev; Russo-Ukrainian war (2022–present)
- Decorations: Guards; Order of Suvorov

Commanders
- Current commander: Maj.Gen Ignatenko Aleksandr Nikolaevich
- Notable commanders: Ivan Maslennikov; Andrei Kolesnikov; Roman Berdnikov; Alexander Romanchuk

The 29th Guards Combined Arms Army (Russian: 29-я гвардейская общевойсковая армия) is a field army of the Russian Ground Forces and previously the Soviet Army.

== History ==
=== 1941–1943 ===
In the opening weeks of Operation Barbarossa, the Soviet Red Army sustained several painful defeats. The Wehrmacht's Army Group North (advancing through the Baltic) and Army Group Center (advancing through Belarus and northern Ukraine) had each defeated the Soviet defenders ahead of their sectors and forced large-scale Soviet withdrawals. As a result of the chaotic withdrawals, a gap started to open between the Soviet defenders in the northern and central sector. On 12 July 1941, the Soviet high command Stavka formed the 29th Army, with the intention to fill the gap in the Soviet defenses.

The 29th Army was initially formed in July 1941 in the Moscow Military District on the basis of 30th Rifle Corps. The 245th, 252nd, 254th and 256th Rifle Divisions, and a number of smaller units made up the Army. It joined the Front of reserve armies and conducted defensive works at Staraya Russa, Demyansk, Ostashkov, Selizharovo. It was reassigned on July 21, 1941, to the Soviet Western Front, and with Western Front, it took part in the Battle of Smolensk, conducted defensive fights in the area to the south of the city of Toropets and on left I protect Volga on a site Rzhev, Staritsa. As part of the Soviet Western Front, since October 17 of the Kalinin Front, it participated in the defense of Kalinin, and the Kalinin, Rzhev–Vyazma 1942, and the Rzhev–Sychyovka offensive operations (the Battles of Rzhev). From the end of August 1942, the army defended occupied boundaries on the left bank of the Volga River. At the beginning of February 1943, the Army's units were transferred to 5th and 20th Armies, and the headquarters was reorganized as headquarters 1st Tank Army.

=== 1968–1988 ===
In Arkhangelsk, Arkhangelsk Oblast, the 44th Special Rifle Corps was activated on 22 June 1956 from HQ Arkhangelsk Military District. In June 1957 it was renamed the 44th Special Army Corps. Three years later it comprised the 69th and 77th Motor Rifle Divisions. In August 1961, it was renamed the 44th Army Corps (44-й армейский корпус). In the late 1960s, the Chinese threat to the Soviet Union appeared to be increasing, and as part of the response, the corps was moved eastward. In 1967, it was moved to the Transbaikal Military District and established its headquarters at Ulan Ude. On 12 May 1970 the 44th Army Corps was renamed the 29th Combined Arms Army.

In 1970 the 91st Motor Rifle Division was formed at Chistye Kluychi (Shelekhovo) and moved to Mongolia in 1979. The 12th Motor Rifle Division also moved to Mongolia, and the 198th Motor Rifle Division was formed in its place, coming under the control of the 29th Army. In 1987, the 91st MRD was withdrawn to Nizhneudinsk and came under the control of the 29th Army.

On 1.12.1987 the 52nd and 91st Motor Rifle Divisions were redesignated the 978th and 497th Territorial Training Centres.

In 1988 the army consisted of the following elements:

- 198th Motor Rifle Division (Divizionnaya, Buryatskaya ASSR)
- 245th Motor Rifle Division (Gusinoozersk, Buryatskaya ASSR)
- 497th Territorial Training Center (Nizhneudinsk, Irkutsk Oblast)(ex 91 MRD)
- 978th Territorial Training Center (Nizhneudinsk, Irkutsk Oblast)
- 12th Fortified Area (Blagoveshchensk, Amur Oblast)

The 29th Army was disbanded by being redesignated 57th Army Corps on 28 February 1988. The corps was disbanded in 1993.

=== 2004–2007 ===
29th Army was then reformed from the 57th Army Corps at Ulan-Ude in 2004, and was active in the Siberian Military District until 2007 when it was apparently again disbanded. Its units in July 2003 included 5th Guards Tank Division, the recently reformed 245th Motor Rifle Division at Gusinoozyorsk, and the 11th Air Assault Brigade.

=== Since 2010 ===
29th Army was reformed once again around 2010/11, with confirmation coming with a Kremlin decree of 9 January 2011 naming the army's commander. General-Major Aleksandr Vladimirovich Romanchuk, named Commander, 29th Army, was relieved of duty as Chief of Staff, First Deputy Commander, 41st Army.

In 2022 it was reported that in the context of the Russian invasion of Ukraine, elements of the 29th Army (including units from the 36th Motor Rifle Brigade and 200th Artillery Brigade) had been deployed to Belarus.

Deployed to fight in Ukraine, according to Ukrainian officials, the commander of the army, major general Andrei Kolesnikov, was killed on 11 March 2022, Kolesnikov was later confirmed in 2023 to be alive, having left 29 CAA in summer 2022. 29 CAA has been actively engaged in fighting in Ukraine through 2022 and 2023.

On 4 March 2025, the army was awarded the Guards status. On 14 February 2026, it was awarded the Order of Suvorov.

== Units subordinate to 29th Army ==
- 36th Separate Guards Motor Rifle Brigade (Borzya) (в/ч 06705)
- 200th Artillery Brigade (Gorny) (в/ч 48271)
- 3rd Rocket Brigade (Gorny) (MUN 33558) (ru:3-я ракетная бригада)
- 140th Separate Anti-Aircraft Rocket Brigade (Domna) (в/ч 32390)
- 101st Headquarters Brigade (Chita)
- 104th Separate Logistics Brigade (Chita)
- 19th Separate NBC Protection Regiment (Gorny) (MUN 56313)
- 225th Weapon Storage and Repair Base (Yasnaya)

== Commanders ==
First formation:

- General-Lieutenant I. I. Maslennikov (July 4, 1941 – December 11, 1941)
- General-Major Vasily Shvetsov (December 12, 1941 – September 1942)
- General-Major Yevgeny Zhuravlev (September 1942 – January 1943)

Third formation:

- General-Lieutenant Aleksandr Vladimirovich Romanchuk (August 2010 – 2014)
- General-Lieutenant Aleksei Yuryevich Avdeyev (Juli 2014 – April 2017)
- General-Major Evgeniy Valentinovich Poplavskiy (April 2017 – November 2018)
- General-Lieutenant Roman Borisovich Berdnikov (November 2018 – November 2021)
- General-Major Andrei Borisovich Kolesnikov (December 2021 – 2022)
- Maj.Gen Ignatenko Aleksandr Nikolaevich (prior to 13 September 2022– December 2022)
- Major general Petr Bolgarev (December 2022 - 2023)
- Major general Oleg Moiseev (2023 - 2025)
