= NGC 199 =

Galaxy in the constellation Pisces

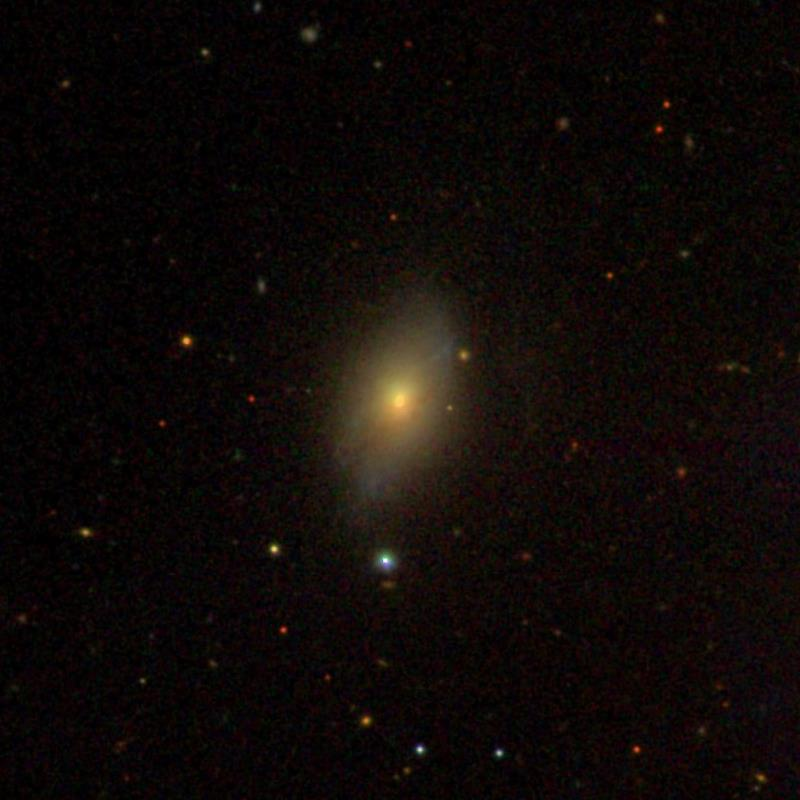
- SDSS image of NGC 199

Observation data (J2000 epoch)
- Constellation: Pisces
- Right ascension: 00^{h} 39^{m} 33.2^{s}
- Declination: +03° 08′ 19″
- Redshift: 0.015351
- Apparent magnitude (V): 14.61

Characteristics
- Type: S0
- Apparent size (V): 1.2' × 0.7'

Other designations
- UGC 00415, CGCG 383-058, MCG +00-02-111, 2MASX J00393318+0308185, PGC 2382.

NGC 199 is a lenticular galaxy located in the constellation Pisces. It was discovered on September 24, 1862, by Heinrich Louis d'Arrest.

== See also ==
- Lenticular galaxy
- List of NGC objects (1–1000)
- Pisces (constellation)
