= Cross of Combat Merit =

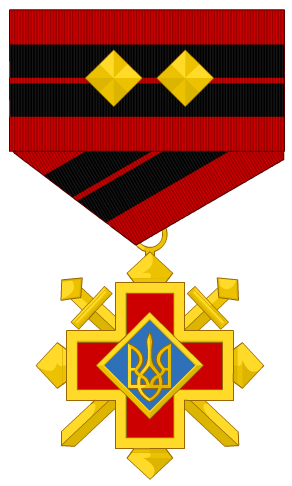
- Golden Cross, I class (original design)
- Type: Military decoration
- Awarded for: Being wounded or killed in any action against an enemy.
- Presented by: Ukrainian Insurgent Army
- Status: Discontinued
- Established: January 27, 1944
- First award: April 22, 1945
- Final award: October 12, 1952

Highlights
- Total: 276
- Ribbon bar

Precedence
- Next (lower): Cross of Merit

The Cross of Combat Merit (Ukrainian: Хрест Заслуги) was the highest award of Ukrainian Insurgent Army. It awarded for distinguished services to the state and people of the Ukrainian army. The Order was instituted on January 27, 1944, by the Ukrainian Supreme Liberation Council leaders, Roman Shukhevych and Dmytro Hrytsai.

The Order is awarded in five (golden, silver and bronze) grades and had a red ribbon with a black stripe.

== Description (badges of original design) ==
	First Class	Second Class	Third Class	Fourth Class	Fifth Class
Badges					
Ribbons					
