= 198th Motor Rifle Division =

Motorized infantry division of the Soviet Army

- Active: 1979–1992
- Country: Soviet Union (1979–1991); Russia (1992)
- Branch: Soviet Army (1979–1991); Russian Ground Forces (1992)
- Type: Motorized infantry
- Garrison/HQ: Divizionnaya

The 198th Motor Rifle Division was a motorized infantry division of the Soviet Army. It existed between 1979 and 1992 and was based in Divizionnaya, Buryat Autonomous Soviet Socialist Republic.

== History ==
The division was activated in March 1979 in Divizionnaya, part of the 29th Army. It replaced the 12th Motor Rifle Division, which was transferred to Mongolia. The division is known to have included the 447th and 859th Motor Rifle Regiments, 503rd Tank Regiment, 1468th Antiaircraft Missile Regiment and the 934th Separate Communications Battalion. During the Cold War, it was maintained at 15% strength. In February 1988, the 29th Army became the 57th Army Corps, and the division became part of the new formation. In June 1992, the division was disbanded and became part of the 5517th Weapons and Equipment Storage Base, along with the 12th Motor Rifle Division.
