= Lectionary 198 =

Lectionary ℓ 198
- New Testament manuscript
- Text: Evangelistarion
- Date: 12th century
- Script: Greek
- Now at: Bodleian Library
- Size: 29.5 cm by 23 cm

Lectionary 198, designated by siglum ℓ 198 (in the Gregory-Aland numbering) is a Greek manuscript of the New Testament, on parchment. Palaeographically it has been assigned to the 12th century. The manuscript has complex contents. Scrivener labelled it by 206^{evl}.

== Description ==
The codex contains lessons from the Gospels of John, Matthew, Luke lectionary (Evangelistarium), on 276 parchment leaves (29.5 cm by 23 cm). It is written in Greek minuscule letters, in two columns per page, 24 lines per page. It contains musical notes. Some leaves were bound up in disorder. The manuscript is "splendid but spoiled by damp".

There are weekday Gospel lessons.

== History ==
Scrivener and Gregory dated the manuscript to the 12th century. Today it is dated by the INTF to the 12th century.

It was added to the list of New Testament manuscripts by Scrivener (number 206). Gregory saw it in 1883.

The manuscript is not cited in the critical editions of the Greek New Testament (UBS3).

Currently the codex is located in the Bodleian Library (E. D. Clarke 45) at Oxford.

== See also ==
- List of New Testament lectionaries
- Biblical manuscript
- Textual criticism

== Bibliography ==
- Gregory, Caspar René (1900). Textkritik des Neuen Testaments, Vol. 1. Leipzig. p. 403.
