= 168th Brigade Support Battalion =

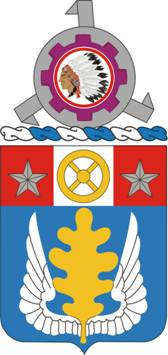
- Coat of arms
- Active: 2006 – De-activated 2015
- Country: United States
- Branch: United States Army
- Type: Support battalion
- Size: Battalion
- Part of: 214th Fires Brigade
- Garrison/HQ: Fort Sill, Oklahoma
- Motto: "Pursuit of Excellence"

Commanders
- Current commander: LTC Mark W. Mays

Insignia
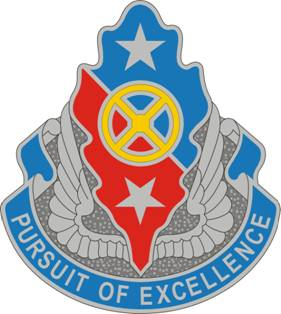
- Distinctive unit insignia

The 168th Brigade Support Battalion is a support battalion of the United States Army based at Fort Sill, Oklahoma. It provides logistic support to the 214th Fires Brigade.

Activated in September 2006, the unit is a logistical support battalion capable of a variety of actions. Though assigned to the 214th Fires Brigade permanently, it is capable of independent operations and taking on subordinate units to fulfill a larger-scale sustainment operation for the United States Army.

== Organization ==
The 168th Brigade Support Battalion is composed of three organic subordinate units: Headquarters and Headquarters Company, Alpha Company (Distribution Company), and Bravo Company (Maintenance Support Company). The battalion has an additional three forward support companies that it provides support to and logistic oversight. These units are the 696th Forward Support Company, the 609th Forward Support Company and the 578th Forward Support Company. Due to the battalion's modular design, it is capable of integrating additional subordinate units upon deployment.

== History ==
The unit was constituted on 1 May 1936 in the United States Army as the 39th Quartermaster Regiment (light maintenance). The regiment was then broken up on 1 June 1940, and elements were designated or disbanded as follows :

The 1st Battalion was redesignated as the 58th Quartermaster Battalion (Light Maintenance).

Companies E and F were also re-designated as 202d and 203d Quartermaster Companies, respectively, with separate lineages.

The remainder of the regiment disbanded.

The battalion was reactivated a year later at Normoyle Quartermaster Depot, Texas. Fewer organic elements were activated from 1938 to 1940 at various stations.

The battalion was next reorganized and re-designated on 1 July 1942 as the 68th Quartermaster Maintenance Battalion and then converted and was re-designated a year later as the 63rd Ordnance Medium Maintenance Battalion (Q). Companies A to D 68th Ordnance Medium Maintenance Battalion (Q) were reorganized and re-designated four months later as 3409th to 3412th Ordnance medium Maintenance Companies (Q), respectively, with separate lineages.

The Headquarters and Headquarters Detachment of the 68th Ordnance Medium Maintenance Battalion (Q) reorganized and was re-designated once again on 1 Nov 1943 as Headquarters and Headquarters Detachment, 68th Ordnance Battalion.

The battalion was inactivated once again on 9 Dec 1945 at Camp Myles Standish, Mass.

Next the battalion was re-designated on 14 Feb 1966 as the Headquarters and Company A, 68th Maintenance Battalion and activated 2 weeks later, 1966 at Fort Campbell, Kentucky.

The battalion was once again reorganized and was re-designated on 30 Apr 1968 as Headquarters and Maintenance Support Company, 68th Maintenance Battalion, but was once more inactivated seven months later at Fort Campbell, Kentucky.

The battalion was re-designated the 168th Brigade Support Battalion and activated on 16 September 2006 at Fort Sill, OK, with organic elements concurrently constituted and activated.

== Campaign participation credits ==
World War II, the Rhineland and Central Europe

Operation Iraqi Freedom, Baghdad, Iraq, July 2007 - October 2008.
