= Dmytro Hrytsai =

Ukrainian nationalist

- Дмитро Грицай
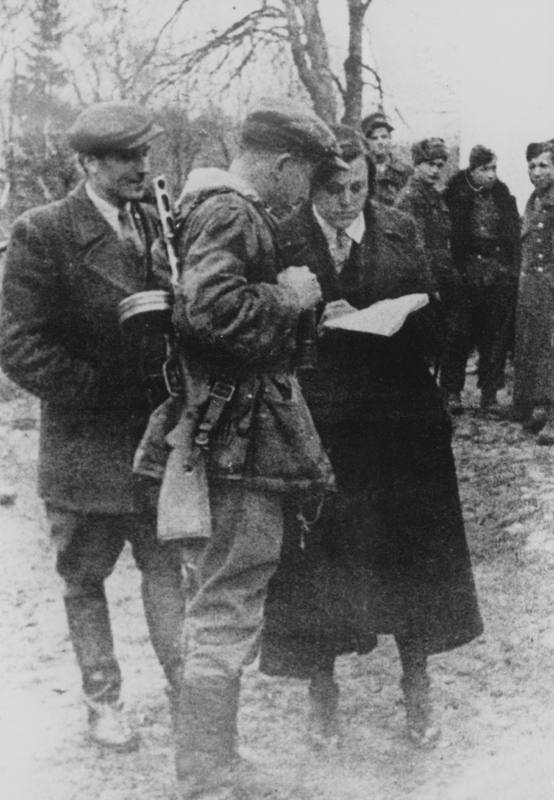
- Clockwise: Roman Shukhevych, Dmytro Hrytsai, and Kateryna Meshko in Buchach in November 1943 shortly before the penultimate phase of massacres of Poles in Volhynia and Eastern Galicia in Rivne, Lutsk, Volodymyr, and Kovel
- Born: 1 April 1907; Verkhnii Dorozhiv, Drohobych Raion, Kingdom of Galicia and Lodomeria
- Died: 19 December 1945 (aged 38); Prague, Czechoslovakia
- Cause of death: Death by hanging (suicide)
- Education: University of Lviv
- Military career
- Allegiance: (Poland) Second Polish Republic (1928–1929); Ukrainian Military Organization (1929–1929); Organization of Ukrainian Nationalists (1933–1945)
- Branch: (Poland) Polish Land Forces (1928–1929); Ukrainian Insurgent Army (1941–1945)
- Service years: 1928–1929; 1941–1945
- Rank: Brigadier General
- Nickname: Perebyinis (Перебийніс)
- Conflicts: World War II: Eastern Front; Anti-Soviet resistance by the Ukrainian Insurgent Army; Massacres of Poles in Volhynia and Eastern Galicia
- Awards: Cross of Merit

Dmytro Hrytsai (Nom de guerre"Perebyinis"; Ukrainian: Дмитрó Грицáй-Переб́ийніс; 1 April 1907 – 22 December 1945) was a leader in the Organization of Ukrainian Nationalists and a general in the Ukrainian Insurgent Army.

== Life ==
Born in Dorozhiv in the Kingdom of Galicia and Lodomeria (now Verkhii Dorozhiv, Lviv Oblast), Hrytsai graduated from gymnasium in Drohobych (then part of eastern Poland) and became a member of the Ukrainian Military Organization (UVO). In 1928, he matriculated in the Lviv University Department of Physics and Mathematics. He did not graduate, being called to military service in the Polish Army. He completed officers' school with distinction.

In this period of his life, he joined the Organization of Ukrainian Nationalists (OUN). From 1933, he directed the OUN Executive's military department. In 1934, he was arrested by the Polish police and was held for over two years at Bereza Kartuska Prison. After his release, he resumed his studies at Lwów University.

In 1939 he was again incarcerated at Bereza Kartuska, but was released after Poland had been overrun by Germany and the Soviet Union.

In 1940–41, Hrytsai was a member of the OUN Revolutionary Directorate and took part in the second Great OUN Congress. In 1941–43 he actively participated in partisan operations against Nazi German forces. From 1941, he headed the OUN's Military Staff, working to discover the German command's tactical plans, creating weapons and supply depots, and training officer cadres for a Ukrainian army.

In 1943, Hrytsai was arrested by the German Gestapo, but was freed by a Ukrainian Insurgent Army (UPA) attack on the prison. He directed UPA's General Staff. In 1945, he became UPA Chief of Staff and received the rank of general.

In 1945, together with OUN Directorate member Taras Maivski, while carrying out assignments for the Ukrainian Chief Council of Liberation, he fell into a Czech police trap while crossing the Czech–German border. Hrytsai committed suicide by hanging while imprisoned in Prague.

== See also ==
- Ukrainian Insurgent Army
