= Oktyabrskoye, Voronezh Oblast =

Oktyabrskoye Октябрьское
- Selo
- Location within Voronezh Oblast Location within Russia
- Coordinates: 51°14′N 41°56′E
- Country: Russia
- Region: Voronezh Oblast
- District: Povorinsky District
- Time zone: UTC+3:00

Oktyabrskoye (Russian: Октя́брьское) is a rural locality (a selo) and the administrative center of Oktyabrskoye Rural Settlement, Povorinsky District, Voronezh Oblast, Russia. The population was 115 as of 2010. There are 19 streets.

== Geography ==
Oktyabrskoye is located 23 km west of Povorino (the district's administrative centre) by road. Rozhdestvenskoye is the nearest rural locality.
