= 168th Motor Rifle Brigade =

150th Motor Rifle Division (1973–1976) 150th Training Motor Rifle Division (1976–1988) 213th District Training Center (1988–1994) 168th Motor Rifle Brigade (1994–1998)
- Active: 1973–1998
- Country: Soviet Union (1973–1991); Russia (1991–1998)
- Branch: Soviet Army (1973–1991); Russian Ground Forces (1991–1998)
- Garrison/HQ: Borzya

The 168th Motor Rifle Brigade was a Russian Ground Forces motorized infantry brigade from 1994 to 1998. It was based in Borzya and traces its lineage to the 150th Motor Rifle Division, activated in 1973. The division became a training unit three years later and was converted into a district training center in 1988. In 1994, the training center became the 168th Motor Rifle Brigade.

The 150th Motor Rifle Division at Borzya went through a number of changes before being disbanded. In March 1972 it was placed in cadre status. It was converted on 1 December 1976 to a training division.

== History ==
The formation of the 150th Motor Rifle Division began in March 1972. The division was activated on 1 July 1973 in Borzya, part of the Transbaikal Military District. It was maintained at 20–25% strength. On 1 December 1976, it became the 150th Training Motor Rifle Division. The division was redesignated the 213th District Training Center (Military Unit Number 30630) on 27 January 1988. On 10 September 1994, the training center became the 168th Separate Motor Rifle Brigade. The brigade was disbanded in June 1998.

On 1 September 1997, it became 272nd Motor Rifle Regiment, 2nd Tank Division, and was later transferred to the 122nd and 131st Motor Rifle Divisions.

== Composition ==
The 150th Training Motor Rifle Division was composed of the following units. All units were based at Borzya unless noted.

- 18th Training Motorized Rifle Regiment
- 378th Training Motorized Rifle Regiment
- 380th Training Motorized Rifle Regiment
- 109th Training Tank Regiment (Sherlovaya Gora, Chita Oblast)
- 1318th Training Artillery Regiment
- 1364th Training Anti-Aircraft Artillery Regiment
- Separate Training Missile Battalion
- Separate Training Anti-Tank Artillery Battalion
- Separate Training Reconnaissance Battalion
- 365th Separate Training Engineer-Sapper Battalion (Sherlovaya Gora, Chita Oblast)
- 311th Separate Training Communications Battalion
- 569th Separate Training Chemical Defence Battalion (Sherlovaya Gora, Chita Oblast)
- 469th Separate Training Equipment Maintenance and Recovery Battalion
- 28th Separate Training Medical Battalion
- Separate Training Motor Transport Battalion
