= Roman Berdnikov =

Russian major general

Roman Borisovich Berdnikov
- Роман Борисович Бердников
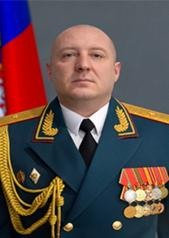
- Born: 31 August 1974 (age 52); Kamen-na-Obi, Russian SFSR, Soviet Union
- Military career
- Allegiance: Russia
- Service years: 1995–present
- Rank: Lieutenant general
- Commands: Commander of the 29th Army
- Conflicts: Syrian Civil War; Russo-Ukrainian War
- Awards: Order "For Merit to the Fatherland"

Roman Borisovich Berdnikov (Russian: Роман Борисович Бердников; born 31 August 1974) is a Russian lieutenant general and former commander of the Western Military District between October and December 2022. He previously commanded the Russian military intervention in Syria. He commanded the 59th Separate Motor Rifle Brigade and, subsequently, the 29th Combined Arms Army.

== Biography ==
Roman Borisovich Berdnikov was born on 31 August 1974 in the town of Kamen-na-Obi, Altai Territory. From 1981 to 1989 he studied at the city school number 4. In 1989 he entered the Suvorov Military School in Kiev. He graduated in 1991 and immediately joined the Moscow Higher Military Command School, wherefrom he graduated in 1995. He married in 1993 as a cadet. He also participated in the 1995 Moscow Victory Day Parades.

After commissioning, Berdnikov began service as a motor rifle platoon commander in Novosibirsk, rising to the rank of chief of staff of a motor rifle regiment there. Berdnikov graduated from the Combined Arms Academy in 2003. After commanding a regiment for 2.5 years, Berdnikov became a deputy brigade commander. He took command of the 59th Separate Motor Rifle Brigade of the Eastern Military District in February 2012 and was promoted to the rank of major general on 11 June 2014. He continued commanding the brigade until August 2014, when he joined the Military Academy of the General Staff.

Upon graduation, he was appointed commander of the 29th Combined Arms Army on 4 March 2019 where his earnings were declared as 3,674,904.53 rubles (equivalent to roughly 56,000 US dollars), about a million more rubles than the previous year. He was promoted to the rank of lieutenant general on 10 December 2020.

In October 2021, he was appointed Commander of the Group of Forces of the Armed Forces of the Russian Federation in the Syrian Arab Republic.

In early June 2022, rumours spread that Berdnikov was killed in Ukraine in the course of the Russo-Ukrainian War, although some sources argue that the fatality was that of general Roman Kutuzov, whose death was confirmed by Russian media on 5 June.

A Ukrainian report suggested he had become commander of Russia's Western Military District on 26 August 2022, and was dismissed on 11 September 2022 amid a Ukrainian counteroffensive. According to Russian media reports, he was appointed commander of the Western Military District on 28 September 2022, replacing Colonel General Alexander Zhuravlyov.

== Awards ==
- Order of Merit for the Fatherland, 4th class with swords
- Order of Alexander Nevsky
- Order of Military Merit
- Medal of Suvorov
- Jubilee Medal "50 Years of Victory in the Great Patriotic War of 1941–1945"
