= 198 BC =

198 BC in various calendars
- Gregorian calendar: 198 BC; CXCVIII BC
- Ab urbe condita: 556
- Ancient Egypt era: XXXIII dynasty, 126
- Pharaoh: Ptolemy V Epiphanes, 6
- Ancient Greek Olympiad (summer): 145th Olympiad, year 3
- Assyrian calendar: 4553
- Balinese saka calendar: N/A
- Bengali calendar: −791 – −790
- Berber calendar: 753
- Buddhist calendar: 347
- Burmese calendar: −835
- Byzantine calendar: 5311–5312
- Chinese calendar: 壬寅年 (Water Tiger); 2500 or 2293 — to — 癸卯年 (Water Rabbit); 2501 or 2294
- Coptic calendar: −481 – −480
- Discordian calendar: 969
- Ethiopian calendar: −205 – −204
- Hebrew calendar: 3563–3564
- Hindu calendars
- Vikram Samvat: −141 – −140
- Shaka Samvat: N/A
- Kali Yuga: 2903–2904
- Holocene calendar: 9803
- Iranian calendar: 819 BP – 818 BP
- Islamic calendar: 844 BH – 843 BH
- Javanese calendar: N/A
- Julian calendar: N/A
- Korean calendar: 2136
- Minguo calendar: 2109 before ROC 民前2109年
- Nanakshahi calendar: −1665
- Seleucid era: 114/115 AG
- Thai solar calendar: 345–346
- Tibetan calendar: ཆུ་ཕོ་སྟག་ལོ་ (male Water-Tiger) −71 or −452 or −1224 — to — ཆུ་མོ་ཡོས་ལོ་ (female Water-Hare) −70 or −451 or −1223

Year 198 BC was a year of the pre-Julian Roman calendar. At the time it was known as the Year of the Consulship of Catus and Flamininus (or, less frequently, year 556 Ab urbe condita). The denomination 198 BC for this year has been used since the early medieval period, when the Anno Domini calendar era became the prevalent method in Europe for naming years.

== Events ==
=== By place ===
==== Roman Republic ====
- After his election to the consulship, Titus Quinctius Flamininus is chosen to replace Publius Sulpicius Galba Maximus as the leading Roman general in Macedonia. He then crosses into Macedonia with his army. Flamininus realizes that future peace depends on breaking the power of king Philip V of Macedon, not merely humbling him. He secures the backing of the Achaean League and then opens peace negotiations with Philip at Nicaea in Locris. Though peace proposals are submitted to the Roman Senate, the talks break down, and fighting resumes.
- Titus Quinctius Flamininus' forces manage to push Philip V out of most of Greece, except for a few fortresses. He then defeats Philip V in the Battle of the Aous, near modern Tepelenë in Albania.

==== Seleucid Empire ====
- The Battle of Panium is fought between Seleucid forces led by Antiochus III and Ptolemaic forces led by Scopas of Aetolia. The Seleucids win the battle which allows Antiochus III to obtain entire possession of Palestine and Coele-Syria from King Ptolemy V of Egypt. Though the Romans send ambassadors to Ptolemy V, they are unable to lend him any serious assistance against Antiochus III.
- In the resulting peace, Antiochus III agrees to give his daughter Cleopatra in marriage to Ptolemy V.

==== China ====
- Following the defeat of the Han at the hands of Modu Chanyu of the Xiongnu at Baideng in 200 BC, the soldier and advisor Lou Jing is dispatched by the emperor Gaozu for negotiations. The peace settlement eventually reached between the parties includes a Han princess given in marriage to the chanyu, initiating a policy of heqin or marriage alliances; periodic tribute of silk, liquor and rice to the Xiongnu; equal status between the states; and the Great Wall as the mutual border. This treaty sets the pattern for relations between the Han and the Xiongnu for some sixty years.
