= 198th Division (2nd Formation) (People's Republic of China) =

198th Army Division (1969–85)
- Active: 1969.11 – 1985
- Country: People's Republic of China
- Branch: People's Liberation Army
- Type: Division
- Role: Infantry
- Part of: 66th Army Corps

The 198th Division(Chinese: 第198师)(2nd Formation) was formed in November 1969 from 5th District, Engineer Corps.

The first formation of the 198th Division had been disbanded earlier in the 1960s and the division HQ transferred to the Navy.

From 1969 the division was a part of 66th Army Corps.

As of 1969 the division was composed of:

- 592nd Infantry Regiment;
- 593rd Infantry Regiment;
- 594th Infantry Regiment;
- Artillery Regiment.

In 1985 the division was disbanded.
