= Mikhail Kovalyov =

Soviet general (1897–1967)

Mikhail Kovalev

Personal details
- Born: Mikhail Prokofievich Kovalev; 7 July 1897 Bryukhovetskaya, Kuban Oblast, Russian Empire
- Died: 31 August 1967 (aged 70) Leningrad, RSFSR, Soviet Union
- Resting place: Bogoslovskoe Cemetery
- Party: CPSU
- Awards: Order of Lenin (2); Order of the Red Banner (4); Order of the Red Banner of Labour; Order of Suvorov, 1st class

Military service
- Allegiance: Soviet Union
- Branch/service: Red Army
- Years of service: 1915–1955
- Rank: Colonel general
- Battles/wars: World War I; Russian Civil War; Tambov Rebellion; Polish-Soviet War; World War II; Invasion of Poland; Winter War; Operation August Storm

Mikhail Prokofievich Kovalev (Russian: Михаи́л Проко́фьевич Ковалёв; 7 July [O.S. 25 June] 1897 – 31 August 1967) was a Soviet military officer and politician who served as the Chairman of the Executive Committee of the Minsk City Council of People's Deputies.

Mikhail Kovalev was born to family of a peasants in stanitsa Bryukhovetskaya, Kuban Oblast. In 1915 he enlisted in the Russian Army. After graduating from a School for Praporshchiks Kovalev fought in World War I commanding a platoon (polurota), company and then a battalion. At the time of the October Revolution he was a Stabs-Captain. During the Russian Civil War he commanded a regiment and then a brigade in the Red Army participating in the fights against White Armies of Denikin, Wrangel and the peasant Tambov Rebellion of Alexander Antonov.

From 1937 Kovalev was the commander of Kiev Military District, then from 1938, he was the commander of Belorussian Military District. He was the commander of the Belarusian Front during the Soviet invasion of Poland in September 1939. Kovalev was also the commander of the 15th Army (Soviet Union) and led the Soviets to victory. As well as leading during the Winter War (1939–1940). He was the commander of Kharkov Military District, then Inspector of Infantry for the Red Army Commander of the Transbaikal Front during 1941.

In July 1945 he became a vice-commander of the Transbaikal Front and participated in military actions against Japan. From 1949 he was a vice-commander of Leningrad Military District. Kovalev retired in 1955 and died in Leningrad in 1967 of lung cancer.

His awards include two Orders of Lenin, four Orders of the Red Banner, an Order of the Red Banner of Labour and an Order of Suvorov, 1st class.
