= Serhii Shevchenko =

Ukrainian writer and journalist

Serhii Shevchenko Сергій Шевченко
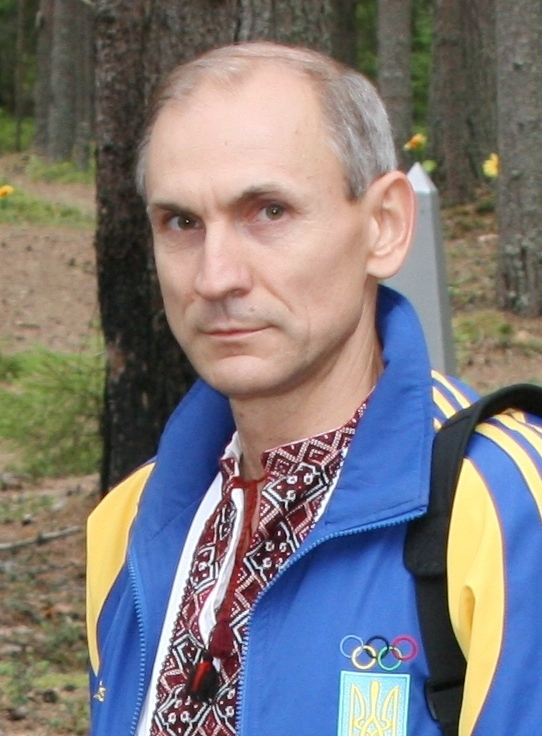
- Serhii Shevchenko is journalist and a writer
- Born: Serhii Volodymyrovych Shevchenko; Ukrainian: Сергій Володимирович Шевченко; August 4, 1960 (age 66); Kramatorsk, Ukrainian SSR, Soviet Union
- Citizenship: Ukraine
- Education: Journalist
- Alma mater: Taras Shevchenko National University of Kyiv (1982)
- Occupations: Journalist, writer
- Writing career
- Genres: Article, essay
- Subject: documentaries
- Notable work: Solovki requiem Ukrainian: Соловецький реквієм (2013)
- Notable awards: Merited Journalist of Ukraine (2007) Award Ivan Franko in information activities (2007, 2018); International Award Volodymyr Vynnychenko (2011); Art Аward Kyiv (2014); Viacheslav Chornovil Prize for the best nonfiction in journalism (2014); Gold Medal of Ukrainian Journalism (2009) The First Prize of the Literary and Scientific Competition of the Ukrainian Free University Foundation (NY, USA) (2023)
- Literary movement: historical research

Serhii Shevchenko (Ukrainian: Сергій Володимирович Шевченко; born August 4, 1960, in Kramatorsk, Ukrainian SSR, Soviet Union (modern-day Donetsk Oblast, Ukraine)) is a Ukrainian writer, journalist and editor. Merited Journalist of Ukraine.

== Biography ==
Shevchenko was born in the town of Kramatorsk, in Ukraine (at that time – the Ukrainian SSR of the Soviet Union). After finishing secondary school in 1977, he enrolled into the Taras Shevchenko National University of Kyiv. In 1982, Shevchenko graduated from the Journalism faculty of University as a journalist. From 1982 to 1985, he worked at the Bila Tserkva newspaper as a correspondent. Then he made a career in the Security Service of Ukraine (press-officer, editor, executive editor, head of research unit of the Institute of State Security Problems). Colonel, a veteran of military service.

2010–2012 – head of Department of the State Service of Ukraine on Drugs Control (activities – international relations, public consultation, interaction with the media). After 2012 creative and social activities, Kyiv.

Shevchenko works in the field of literature since the 2000s. He is the author of a number of books about the tragedy Solovki, Sandarmokh, and also numerous articles in the periodical press. August 2, 2012, he has been stopped from taking part in the Days of Remembrance for the Victims of the Terror in the Sandarmokh Clearing in Karelia. He was one of a delegation from Ukraine travelling to Sandarmokh for annually held memorial events which mark the anniversary of the unleashing of what is known as the Great Terror (1937—1938). It is not clear what the grounds are for refusing Serhiy Shevchenko entry to Russia.

From October 2017 to June 2019, he worked as an assistant to the president of the National Union of Journalists of Ukraine (NUJU).

From May 2022, on the recommendation of the NUJU, he was a participant in the international program of professional protection of journalists "Journalists-in-Residence Kosovo" and lived in Pristina, Kosovo.

Shevchenko is a member of the National Union of Journalists of Ukraine (1994), the National Writer's Union of Ukraine (2011), the National Union of Ukrainian ethnographers (2015).

== Books ==
- The Archipelago of special purpose, 2006. (in Ukrainian)
- "Golden Feather. Liudmyla Mekh" (Ukrainian: ″Золоте перо. Людмила Мех″), 2012. (in Ukrainian)
- Solovki requiem, 2013. The author of this book has been nominated for the Shevchenko National Prize. (in Ukrainian)
- Empire of Terror (Ukrainian: Імперія терору), 2021. (in Ukrainian)

Books written by Serhii Shevchenko and historian Dmytro Viedienieiev:

- "Ukrainian Solovki" (″Ukrains'ki Solovky″, Ukrainian: Українські Соловки, 2001). (in Ukrainian)
- ″Dispelled myths. Historical essays and articles″ (Ukrainian: Розвіяні міфи. Історичні нариси і статті, 2010). (in Ukrainian)

== Articles ==
- The Moloch of the Solovky terror, 2008.
- The secrets of Mt. Sekirnaia, 2007.
- Shot at Sandarmokh. [http://www.day.kiev.ua/uk/article/ukrayina-incognita/rozstrilyani-v-sandarmosi Розстріляні в Сандармосі] // День. – 2006. – № 180. – 20 жовтня.
- [https://gazeta.dt.ua/HISTORY/rik-zhertv-velikogo-teroru-vshanuymo-pam-yat-represovanih-243654_.html Рік жертв Великого терору: вшануймо пам'ять репресованих] // Дзеркало тижня. Україна. – 2017. – № 20. – 27 травня – 2 червня
- [http://gazeta.dt.ua/history/oleksa-vlizko-tayemnicya-strati-poeta-_.html Олекса Влизько: таємниця страти поета] // Дзеркало тижня. Україна. – 2015. – № 26. – 17–24 липня.
- [http://gazeta.dt.ua/history/gro-vakar-im-ya-z-moroku-solovkiv-_.html Ґро Вакар: ім'я з мороку Соловків] // Дзеркало тижня. Україна. – 2015. – № 21. – 12–19 червня.
- [http://gazeta.dt.ua/history/spisok-sandarmohu-ubiyenni-sini-i-pasinki-ukrayini-_.html "Список Сандармоху": убієнні сини (і "пасинки"?) України] // Дзеркало тижня. Україна. – 2015. – № 9. – 13–20 березня.
- [http://gazeta.dt.ua/history/volodimir-udovenko-dvi-dati-rozstrilu-_.html Володимир Удовенко: дві дати розстрілу] // Дзеркало тижня. Україна. – 2015. – № 1. – 16–23 січня.
- [http://gazeta.dt.ua/history/parshiva-vivcya-sered-katolickih-muchenikiv-_.html }Паршива вівця серед католицьких мучеників] // Дзеркало тижня. Україна. – 2014. – № 47. – 12–19 грудня.
- [http://svitlytsia.crimea.ua/?section=article&artID=14028 Микола Зеров: неокласика політичних репресій] // Кримська світлиця. – 2014. – № 39. – 26 вересня.
- [http://gazeta.dt.ua/history/vsevolod-gancov-zhittya-pislya-svincevoyi-zlivi-_.html Всеволод Ганцов: життя після свинцевої зливи] // Дзеркало тижня. Україна. – 2014. – № 18. – 22–30 травня.
- [http://gazeta.dt.ua/history/mikola-narushevich-sche-odna-tayemnicya-ostannoyi-adresi-_.html Микола Нарушевич: ще одна таємниця "останньої адреси"] // Дзеркало тижня. Україна. – 2014. – № 10. – 21–28 березня.
- [http://gazeta.dt.ua/history/vipusknik-soloveckoyi-akademiyi-_.html Випускник "соловецької академії"] // Дзеркало тижня. Україна. – 2014. – № 6. – 22–28 лютого.
- [http://www.day.kiev.ua/uk/article/ukrayina-incognita/bezzhalni-shchupalcya-imperiyi Безжальні щупальця імперії] // День. – 2014. – № 32. – 21 лютого.
- [http://gazeta.dt.ua/history/mikola-narushevich-sche-odna-tayemnicya-ostannoyi-adresi-_.html "Остання адреса" Геннадія Садовського: "Любіть Україну за важке минуле та сучасне. Любіть її, як я її любив!"] // Дзеркало тижня. Україна. – 2014. – № 3. – 31 січня – 7 лютого.
- [http://www.radiosvoboda.org/content/article/24477305.html Списки Сандармоху: апофеоз "громадянських сутінків"] // Сайт Радіо Свобода. – 2012. – 8 лютого.
- [http://gazeta.dt.ua/SOCIETY/mikola_lyubinskiy_i_logika_chervonogo_teroru__nevidomi_storinki_ukrayinskogo_rozstrilyanogo_vidrodzh.html Микола Любинський і логіка червоного терору. Невідомі сторінки українського Розстріляного відродження] // Дзеркало тижня. – 2008. – № 6. – 18–25 квітня.
- [http://www.day.kiev.ua/uk/article/cuspilstvo/perestoroga Пересторога] // День. – 2007. – № 58. – 4 квітня.
- [http://www.day.kiev.ua/uk/article/ukrayina-incognita/iz-solovkiv-ne-povernuvsya Із Соловків не повернувся...] // День. – 2005. – № 228. – 9 грудня.
- [http://www.day.kiev.ua/uk/article/istoriya-i-ya/les-kurbas-silu-naciyi-ne-mozhut-vbiti-niyaki-dekreti Лесь Курбас: «Силу нації не можуть вбити ніякі декрети»] // День. – 2005. – № 199. – 29 жовтня.
- [http://incognita.day.kiev.ua/kozaczkij-xrest-v-urochishhi-sandarmox.htm Козацький хрест в урочищі Сандармох] // День. – 2005. – № 155. – 30 серпня.
- [http://www.day.kiev.ua/uk/article/ukrayina-incognita/biografiya-gilyotini-ukrayini Біографія "гільйотини України"] // День. – 2002. – № 114. – 27 червня.

== Awards ==
- Honorary title of Ukraine (Ukrainian: Почесне звання України) ″Merited Journalist of Ukraine″ (2007), the state award.
- Award Ivan Franko in information activities (2007, 2018), the award of the State Committee for Television and Radio Broadcasting of Ukraine and the National Union of Journalists of Ukraine.
- International Award Volodymyr Vynnychenko (2011), the award of the Ukrainian Cultural Foundation.
- Art Аward ″Kyiv″ (2014), the award of the Kiev City State Administration.
- Viacheslav Chornovil Prize for the best nonfiction in journalism (2014), the award of the State Committee for Television and Radio Broadcasting of Ukraine and the National Union of Journalists of Ukraine.
- The First Prize of the Literary and Scientific Competition of the Ukrainian Free University Foundation (NY, USA) (2023) (in Ukrainian)
- Gold Medal of Ukrainian Journalism (2009), the award of the National Union of Journalists of Ukraine.
