= Domna, Zabaykalsky Krai =

Domna Домна
- Selo
- Location within Zabaykalsky Krai Location within Russia
- Coordinates: 51°53′N 113°09′E
- Country: Russia
- Region: Zabaykalsky Krai
- District: Chitinsky District
- Time zone: UTC+9:00

Domna (Russian: Домна) is a rural locality (a selo) in Chitinsky District, Zabaykalsky Krai, Russia. Population: 6,078 (2021 census); 6,686 (2010 census); 6,874 (2002 census); There are 40 streets in this selo.

== Geography ==
This rural locality is located 28 km from Chita (the district's administrative centre and capital of Zabaykalsky Krai) and 5,201 km from Moscow. Amodovo is the nearest rural locality.
