= Mikhail Velikanov =

Soviet komkor (1892–1938)

Mikhail Dmitrievich Velikanov
- Born: January 8, 1893; Nikolskoe, Ryazan Governorate, Russian Empire
- Died: July 29, 1938 (aged 45); Moscow, Russian SFSR, Soviet Union
- Military career
- Allegiance: Russian Empire (1914–1917); Soviet Union (1918–1937)
- Service years: 1914–1937
- Rank: Komandarm 2nd rank
- Awards: Order of the Red Banner

Mikhail Dmitrievich Velikanov (Russian: Михаил Дмитриевич Великанов) (December 27, 1892 – July 27, 1938) was a Soviet military commander (Komkor) involved in the Russian Civil War.

He was born into a Russian peasant family in Nikolskoye, present-day Ryazan Oblast. He fought in World War I and joined the Red Army in February 1918. During the Russian Civil War, he started his service as a commander of a company and quickly rose to higher ranks. He distinguished himself in the Battle of Simbirsk (October 1918) and as a commander of the 1st Brigade of the "Iron Division" (December 1918). He then commanded the 20th Rifle Division (February–March 1919) and the Ufa army group (March–April 1919) which took part in the smashing of Aleksandr Kolchak’s White forces in the Ural area. Velikanov led the defense of Orenburg from April to June 1919, and commanded shock infantry troops within the 1st Cavalry Army in February 1920. He suppressed the Azerbaijani uprising in Ganja (May 1920), and took part in the campaigns in Armenia (December 1920) and Georgia (February–March 1921).

He became a Bolshevik party member in 1924 and served as a deputy commander of the North Caucasus Military District from 1930 to 1933. Later he commanded troops in the Central Asian Military District (December 1933-June 1937) and the Transbaikal Military District (June–November 1937). In 1935, he was made Comandarm 2nd rank. He was sacked in November 1937 and arrested in December 1937. He was executed in 1938 and rehabilitated in 1956.
