= 198th =

198th may refer to:

- 198th Airlift Squadron flies the C-130 Hercules
- 198th Battalion (Canadian Buffs), CEF, a unit in the Canadian Expeditionary Force during the First World War
- 198th Division (1st Formation) (People's Republic of China), a military formation of the People's Volunteer Army during the Korean War
- 198th (East Lancashire) Brigade, a First World War infantry brigade of the British Army
- 198th Infantry Brigade, was first formed as part of the United States Army Reserve's 99th Division

== See also ==
- AD 198, the year 198 (CXCVIII) of the Julian calendar
