= Selenginsky District =

Selenginsky District Селенгинский район (Russian)
- District

Other transcription(s)
  - Buryat: Сэлэнгын аймаг
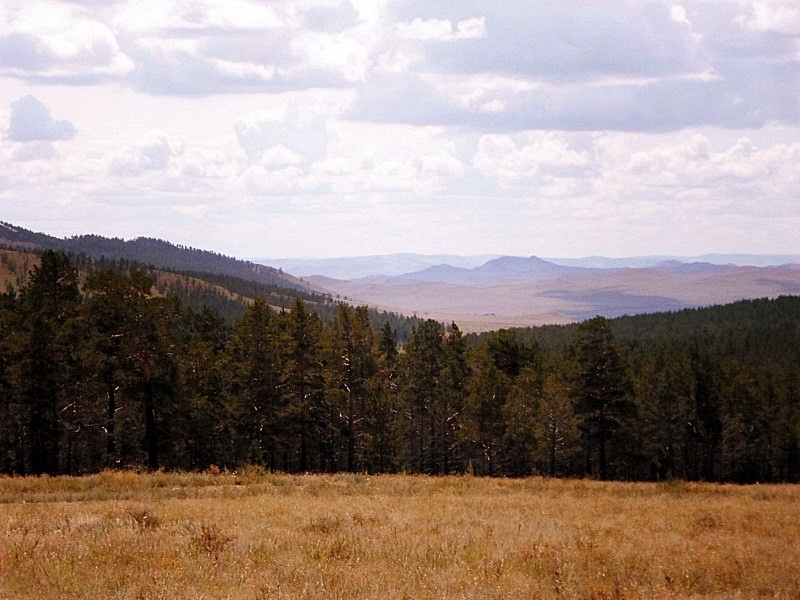
- Slopes of the Monostoy Range of the Selenga Highlands in Selenginsky District

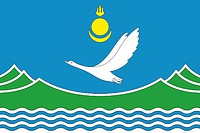
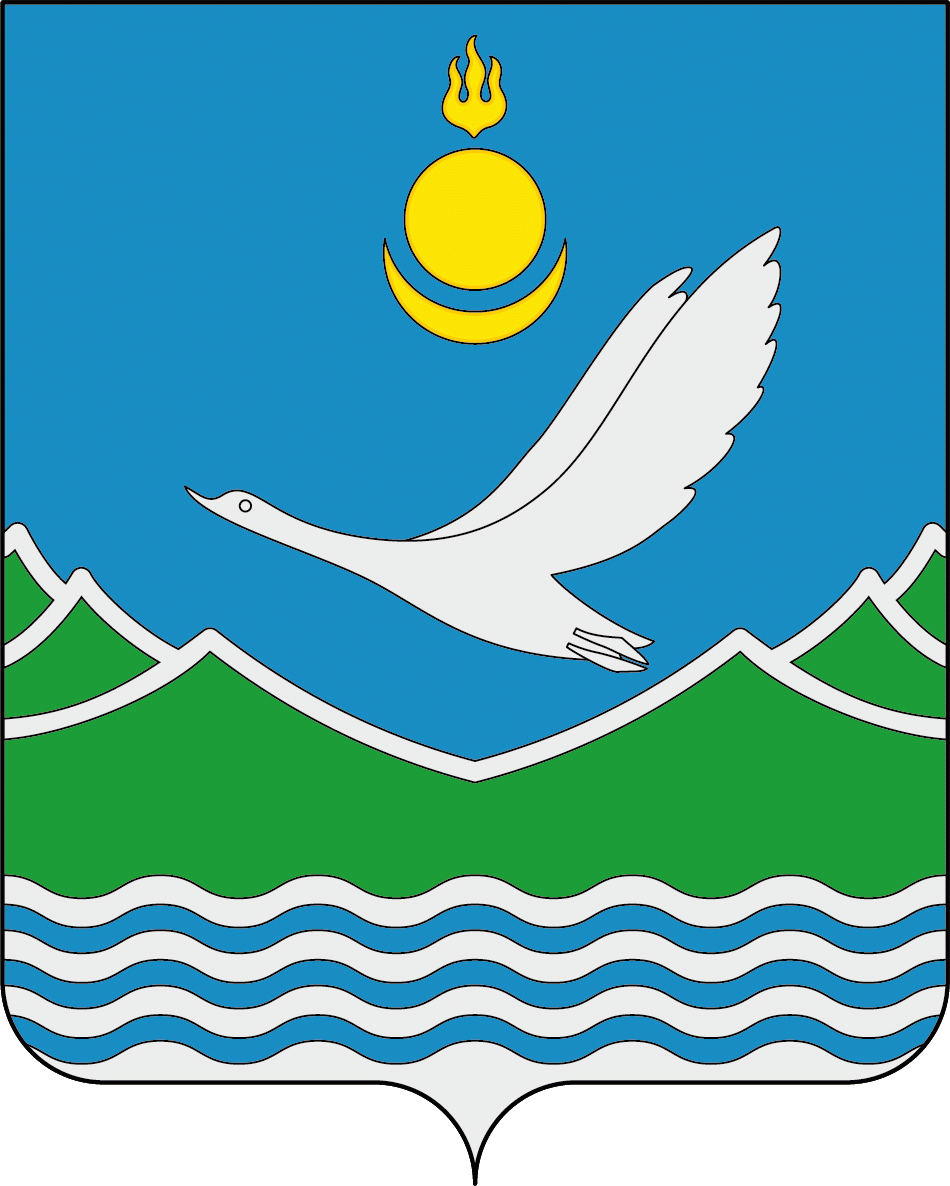
- Flag Coat of arms
- Location of Selenginsky District in the Buryat Republic
- Coordinates: 51°17′N 106°31′E
- Country: Russia
- Federal subject: Republic of Buryatia
- Established: December 12, 1923
- Administrative center: Gusinoozyorsk

Area
  - Total: 8,269 km^{2} (3,193 sq mi)

Population (2010 Census)
  - Total: 46,427
  - Density: 5.615/km^{2} (14.54/sq mi)
  - Urban: 52.9%
  - Rural: 47.1%

Administrative structure
  - Administrative divisions: 1 Towns, 6 Selsoviets, 7 Somons
  - Inhabited localities: 1 cities/towns, 36 rural localities

Municipal structure
  - Municipally incorporated as: Selenginsky Municipal District
  - Municipal divisions: 1 urban settlements, 12 rural settlements
- Time zone: UTC+8 (MSK+5)
- OKTMO ID: 81648000
- Website: http://admselenga.ru

Population of Selenginsky District
- 2010 Census: 46,427
- 2002 Census: 50,632
- 1989 Census: 27,098
- 1979 Census: 28,662

Selenginsky District (Russian: Селенги́нский райо́н; Buryat: Сэлэнгын аймаг, Selengyn aimag) is an administrative and municipal district (raion), one of the twenty-one in the Republic of Buryatia, Russia. It is located in the center of the republic. The area of the district is 8,269 square kilometers (3,193 sq mi). Its administrative center is the town of Gusinoozyorsk. As of the 2010 Census, the total population of the district was 46,427, with the population of Gusinoozyorsk accounting for 52.9% of that number.

== History ==
The district was established on December 12, 1923.

== Administrative and municipal status ==
Within the framework of administrative divisions, Selenginsky District is one of the twenty-one in the Republic of Buryatia. It is divided into one town (an administrative division with the administrative center in the town (an inhabited locality) of Gusinoozyorsk), six selsoviets, and seven somons, which comprise thirty-six rural localities. As a municipal division, the district is incorporated as Selenginsky Municipal District. The Town of Gusinoozyorsk is incorporated an urban settlement, and the six selsoviets and seven somons are incorporated as twelve rural settlements within the municipal district. The town of Gusinoozyorsk serves as the administrative center of both the administrative and municipal district.
