= Gusinoozyorsk =

Town in the Republic of Buryatia, Russia

Gusinoozersk Гусиноозёрск
- Town

Other transcription(s)
  - Buryat: Галуута Нуур
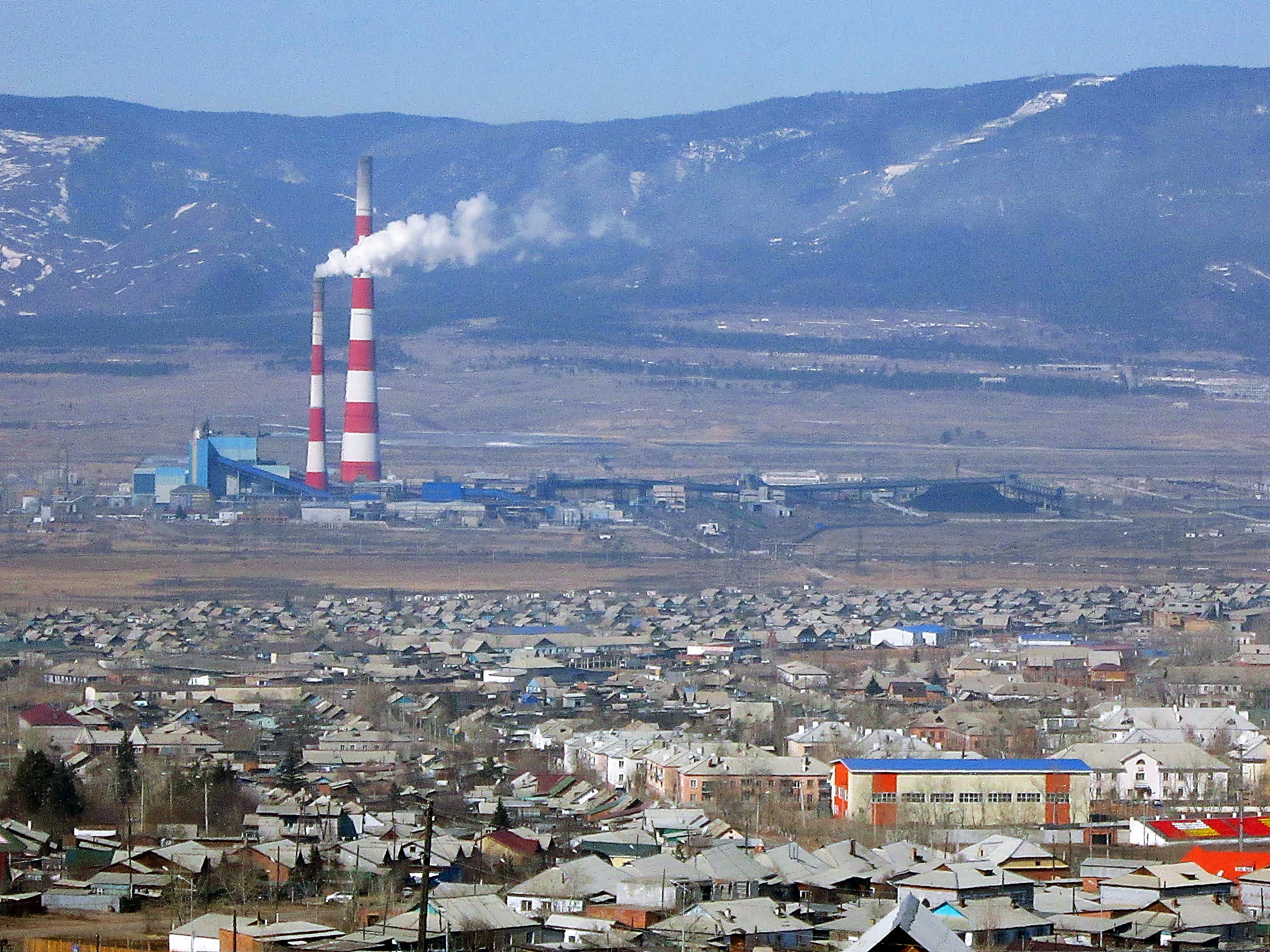
- View of Gusinoozersk
- Interactive map of Gusinoozersk
- Location of Gusinoozersk Gusinoozersk (Republic of Buryatia)
- Coordinates: 51°17′N 106°31′E
- Country: Russia
- Federal subject: Buryatia
- Administrative district: Selenginsky District
- TownSelsoviet: Gusinoozersk
- Founded: 1939
- Town status since: 1953
- Elevation: 580 m (1,900 ft)

Population (2010 Census)
  - Total: 24,582
  - Estimate (2025): 24,319 (−1.1%)

Administrative status
  - Capital of: Selenginsky District, Town of Gusinoozersk

Municipal status
  - Municipal district: Selenginsky Municipal District
  - Urban settlement: Gusinoozersk Urban Settlement
  - Capital of: Selenginsky Municipal District, Gusinoozersk Urban Settlement
- Time zone: UTC+8 (MSK+5)
- Postal code: 671160
- Dialing code: +7 30145
- OKTMO ID: 81648101001
- Website: admingus.ru

Gusinoozersk (Russian: Гусиноозёрск; Buryat: Галуута Нуур, Galuuta Nuur; Mongolian: Галуутнуур, Galuutnuur) is a town and the administrative center of Selenginsky District of the Republic of Buryatia, Russia. Population: 24,582 (2010 census); 26,502 (2002 census); 29,790 (1989 Soviet census); 13,800 (1970). It was previously known as Shakhty (until 1953).

== Geography ==
The town is located in the area of the Selenga Highlands, on the northeastern shore of Lake Gusinoye, 110 kilometers (68 mi) southwest of Ulan-Ude.

== History ==
It was founded in 1939 under the name Shakhty (Ша́хты), in connection with the commencement of exploitation of brown coal deposits in the area. In 1953, it was granted town status and given its present name, derived from Gusinoye Ozero (lit. "goose lake"), the Russian name for the lake on which the town stands.

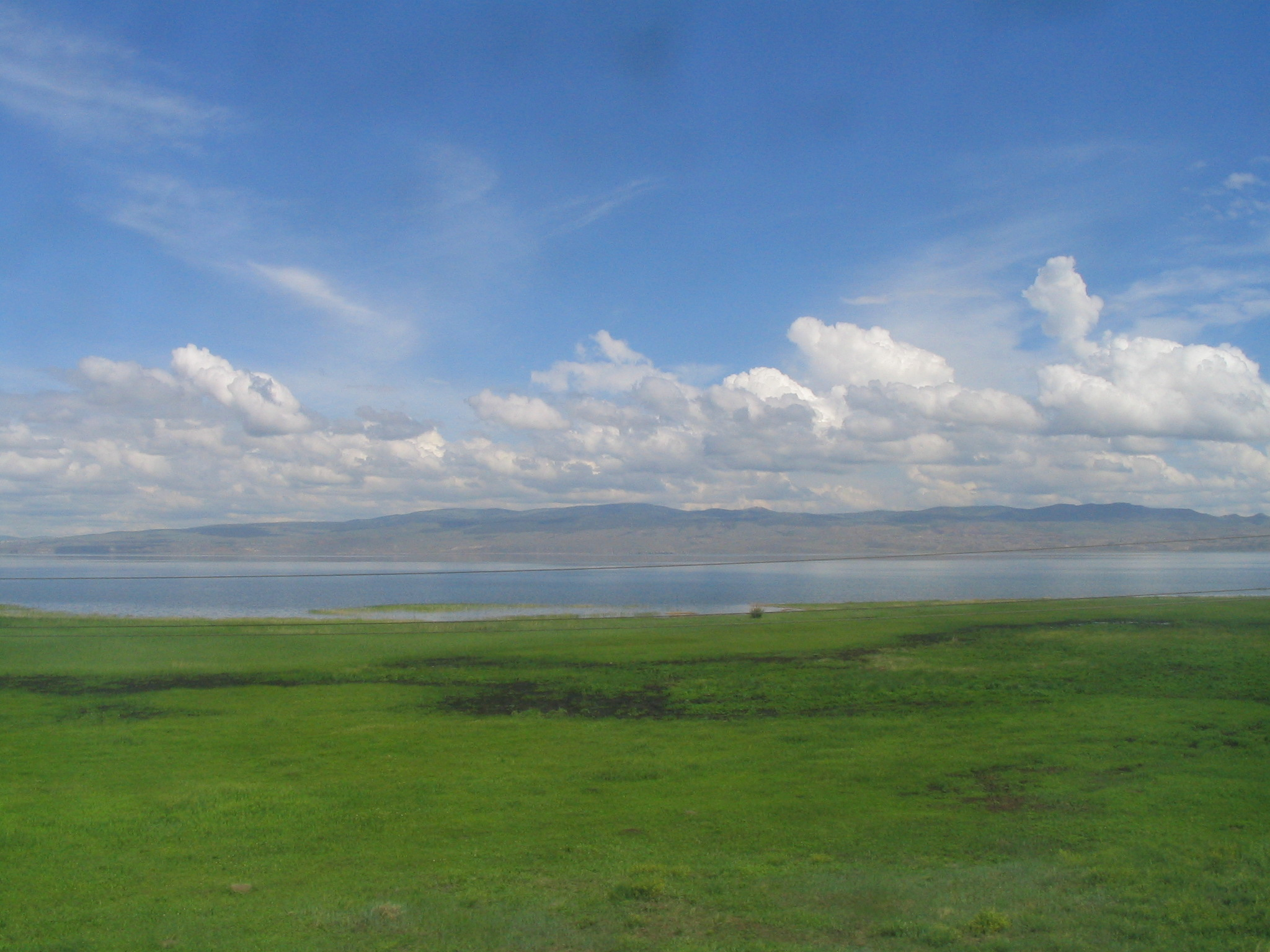
Lake Gusinoye south of the town

== Administrative and municipal status ==
Within the framework of administrative divisions, Gusinoozersk serves as the administrative center of Selenginsky District. As an administrative division, it is, together with two rural localities, incorporated within Selenginsky District as the Town of Gusinoozersk. As a municipal division, the Town of Gusinoozyorsk is incorporated within Selenginsky Municipal District as Gusinoozersk Urban Settlement.

== Economy ==
The main focus of the town's economy remains brown coal production and the associated power station, although mining activities on the nearby deposits slowed during the economic crisis of the 1990s.

=== Transportation ===
Zagustay railway station on the Trans-Mongolian Railway is located 5 kilometers (3.1 mi) north-west of the town.

== Military ==
The 245th Motor Rifle Division of the Russian Ground Forces was located in the town until it was reduced to a Base for Storage of Weapons and Equipment in 2006.
