= Fominsky =

Fominsky (Russian: Фоминский; masculine), Fominskaya (Фоминская; feminine), or Fominskoye (Фоминское; neuter) is the name of several rural localities in Russia.

== Modern localities ==
=== Altai Krai ===
As of 2012, one rural locality in Altai Krai bears this name:

- Fominskoye, Altai Krai (or Fominskaya), a selo under the administrative jurisdiction of the city of krai significance of Biysk; 52°27′N 84°55′E

=== Arkhangelsk Oblast ===
As of 2012, seventeen rural localities in Arkhangelsk Oblast bear this name:

- Fominsky, Konoshsky District, Arkhangelsk Oblast, a settlement in Vokhtomsky Selsoviet of Konoshsky District
- Fominsky, Vilegodsky District, Arkhangelsk Oblast, a settlement in Selyansky Selsoviet of Vilegodsky District
- Fominskaya, Kargopolsky District, Arkhangelsk Oblast, a village in Pechnikovsky Selsoviet of Kargopolsky District
- Fominskaya, Konoshsky District, Arkhangelsk Oblast, a village in Vokhtomsky Selsoviet of Konoshsky District
- Fominskaya, Belosludsky Selsoviet, Krasnoborsky District, Arkhangelsk Oblast, a village in Belosludsky Selsoviet of Krasnoborsky District
- Fominskaya, Cherevkovsky Selsoviet, Krasnoborsky District, Arkhangelsk Oblast, a village in Cherevkovsky Selsoviet of Krasnoborsky District
- Fominskaya, Lyakhovsky Selsoviet, Krasnoborsky District, Arkhangelsk Oblast, a village in Lyakhovsky Selsoviet of Krasnoborsky District
- Fominskaya, Permogorsky Selsoviet, Krasnoborsky District, Arkhangelsk Oblast, a village in Permogorsky Selsoviet of Krasnoborsky District
- Fominskaya, Kozminsky Selsoviet, Lensky District, Arkhangelsk Oblast, a village in Kozminsky Selsoviet of Lensky District
- Fominskaya, Slobodchikovsky Selsoviet, Lensky District, Arkhangelsk Oblast, a village in Slobodchikovsky Selsoviet of Lensky District
- Fominskaya, Rovdinsky Selsoviet, Shenkursky District, Arkhangelsk Oblast, a village in Rovdinsky Selsoviet of Shenkursky District
- Fominskaya, Tarnyansky Selsoviet, Shenkursky District, Arkhangelsk Oblast, a village in Tarnyansky Selsoviet of Shenkursky District
- Fominskaya, Velsky District, Arkhangelsk Oblast, a village in Lipovsky Selsoviet of Velsky District
- Fominskaya, Novovershinsky Selsoviet, Verkhnetoyemsky District, Arkhangelsk Oblast, a village in Novovershinsky Selsoviet of Verkhnetoyemsky District
- Fominskaya, Timoshinsky Selsoviet, Verkhnetoyemsky District, Arkhangelsk Oblast, a village in Timoshinsky Selsoviet of Verkhnetoyemsky District
- Fominskaya, Ilyinsky Selsoviet, Vilegodsky District, Arkhangelsk Oblast, a village in Ilyinsky Selsoviet of Vilegodsky District
- Fominskaya, Selyansky Selsoviet, Vilegodsky District, Arkhangelsk Oblast, a village in Selyansky Selsoviet of Vilegodsky District

=== Chelyabinsk Oblast ===
As of 2012, one rural locality in Chelyabinsk Oblast bears this name:

- Fominsky, Chelyabinsk Oblast, a settlement in Uysky Selsoviet of Uysky District

=== Ivanovo Oblast ===
As of 2012, four rural localities in Ivanovo Oblast bear this name:

- Fominskoye (selo), Furmanovsky District, Ivanovo Oblast, a selo in Furmanovsky District
- Fominskoye (village), Furmanovsky District, Ivanovo Oblast, a village in Furmanovsky District
- Fominskoye, Kineshemsky District, Ivanovo Oblast, a village in Kineshemsky District
- Fominskoye, Zavolzhsky District, Ivanovo Oblast, a village in Zavolzhsky District

=== Republic of Karelia ===
As of 2012, one rural locality in the Republic of Karelia bears this name:

- Fominskaya, Republic of Karelia, a village in Medvezhyegorsky District

=== Kostroma Oblast ===
As of 2012, four rural localities in Kostroma Oblast bear this name:

- Fominskoye, Buysky District, Kostroma Oblast, a village in Tsentralnoye Settlement of Buysky District; 58°24′N 41°20′E
- Fominskoye, Galichsky District, Kostroma Oblast, a village in Dmitriyevskoye Settlement of Galichsky District; 58°20′N 42°22′E
- Fominskoye, Kostromskoy District, Kostroma Oblast, a selo in Sandogorskoye Settlement of Kostromskoy District; 58°9′N 41°2′E
- Fominskoye, Susaninsky District, Kostroma Oblast, a village in Sumarokovskoye Settlement of Susaninsky District; 58°9′N 41°49′E

=== Moscow ===
As of 2012, one rural locality in Moscow bears this name:

- Fominskoye, Moscow, a village in Pervomayskoye Settlement of Troitsky Administrative Okrug in the federal city of Moscow

=== Moscow Oblast ===
As of 2012, four rural localities in Moscow Oblast bear this name:

- Fominskoye, Mytishchinsky District, Moscow Oblast, a village in Fedoskinskoye Rural Settlement of Mytishchinsky District
- Fominskoye, Ramensky District, Moscow Oblast, a village in Ulyaninskoye Rural Settlement of Ramensky District
- Fominskoye, Solnechnogorsky District, Moscow Oblast, a village in Smirnovskoye Rural Settlement of Solnechnogorsky District
- Fominskoye, Taldomsky District, Moscow Oblast, a village in Yermolinskoye Rural Settlement of Taldomsky District

=== Nizhny Novgorod Oblast ===
As of 2012, one rural locality in Nizhny Novgorod Oblast bears this name:

- Fominskoye, Nizhny Novgorod Oblast, a village in Bolshearyevsky Selsoviet of Urensky District

=== Smolensk Oblast ===
As of 2012, one rural locality in Smolensk Oblast bears this name:

- Fominskoye, Smolensk Oblast, a village in Mytishinskoye Rural Settlement of Ugransky District

=== Sverdlovsk Oblast ===
As of 2012, two rural localities in Sverdlovsk Oblast bear this name:

- Fominskoye, Alapayevsky District, Sverdlovsk Oblast, a selo in Alapayevsky District
- Fominskoye, Tugulymsky District, Sverdlovsk Oblast, a selo in Tugulymsky District

=== Tver Oblast ===
As of 2012, two rural localities in Tver Oblast bear this name:

- Fominskoye, Sonkovsky District, Tver Oblast, a village in Koyskoye Rural Settlement of Sonkovsky District
- Fominskoye, Udomelsky District, Tver Oblast, a village in Kotlovanskoye Rural Settlement of Udomelsky District

=== Volgograd Oblast ===
As of 2012, one rural locality in Volgograd Oblast bears this name:

- Fominsky, Volgograd Oblast, a khutor under the administrative jurisdiction of Novonikolayevsky Urban-Type Settlement in Novonikolayevsky District

=== Vologda Oblast ===
As of 2012, twelve rural localities in Vologda Oblast bear this name:

- Fominsky, Vologda Oblast, a pochinok in Kurilovsky Selsoviet of Kichmengsko-Gorodetsky District
- Fominskoye, Cherepovetsky District, Vologda Oblast, a village in Shalimovsky Selsoviet of Cherepovetsky District
- Fominskoye, Kharovsky District, Vologda Oblast, a village in Kharovsky Selsoviet of Kharovsky District
- Fominskoye, Fominsky Selsoviet, Sheksninsky District, Vologda Oblast, a village in Fominsky Selsoviet of Sheksninsky District
- Fominskoye, Yeremeyevsky Selsoviet, Sheksninsky District, Vologda Oblast, a village in Yeremeyevsky Selsoviet of Sheksninsky District
- Fominskoye, Totemsky District, Vologda Oblast, a village in Pogorelovsky Selsoviet of Totemsky District
- Fominskaya, Babayevsky District, Vologda Oblast, a village in Komonevsky Selsoviet of Babayevsky District
- Fominskaya, Totemsky District, Vologda Oblast, a village in Moseyevsky Selsoviet of Totemsky District
- Fominskaya, Velikoustyugsky District, Vologda Oblast, a village in Nizhneshardengsky Selsoviet of Velikoustyugsky District
- Fominskaya, Kolengsky Selsoviet, Verkhovazhsky District, Vologda Oblast, a village in Kolengsky Selsoviet of Verkhovazhsky District
- Fominskaya, Morozovsky Selsoviet, Verkhovazhsky District, Vologda Oblast, a village in Morozovsky Selsoviet of Verkhovazhsky District
- Fominskaya, Vozhegodsky District, Vologda Oblast, a village in Maryinsky Selsoviet of Vozhegodsky District

=== Yaroslavl Oblast ===
As of 2012, ten rural localities in Yaroslavl Oblast bear this name:

- Fominskoye, Bolsheselsky District, Yaroslavl Oblast, a village in Chudinovsky Rural Okrug of Bolsheselsky District
- Fominskoye, Borisoglebsky District, Yaroslavl Oblast, a village in Krasnooktyabrsky Rural Okrug of Borisoglebsky District
- Fominskoye, Vakhtinsky Rural Okrug, Danilovsky District, Yaroslavl Oblast, a village in Vakhtinsky Rural Okrug of Danilovsky District
- Fominskoye, Zimenkovsky Rural Okrug, Danilovsky District, Yaroslavl Oblast, a village in Zimenkovsky Rural Okrug of Danilovsky District
- Fominskoye, Kholmovsky Rural Okrug, Poshekhonsky District, Yaroslavl Oblast, a village in Kholmovsky Rural Okrug of Poshekhonsky District
- Fominskoye, Kolodinsky Rural Okrug, Poshekhonsky District, Yaroslavl Oblast, a village in Kolodinsky Rural Okrug of Poshekhonsky District
- Fominskoye, Nazarovsky Rural Okrug, Rybinsky District, Yaroslavl Oblast, a village in Nazarovsky Rural Okrug of Rybinsky District
- Fominskoye, Volzhsky Rural Okrug, Rybinsky District, Yaroslavl Oblast, a village in Volzhsky Rural Okrug of Rybinsky District
- Fominskoye, Tutayevsky District, Yaroslavl Oblast, a settlement in Fominsky Rural Okrug of Tutayevsky District
- Fominskoye, Uglichsky District, Yaroslavl Oblast, a village in Otradnovsky Rural Okrug of Uglichsky District

== Abolished localities ==
- Fominskoye, Parfenyevsky District, Kostroma Oblast, a village in Anosovsky Selsoviet of Parfenyevsky District in Kostroma Oblast; abolished on October 18, 2004
