= Peski =

Peski (Russian: Пески) is the name of several inhabited localities in Russia.

== Arkhangelsk Oblast ==
As of 2010, one rural locality in Arkhangelsk Oblast bears this name:

- Peski, Arkhangelsk Oblast, a village in Pustoshinsky Selsoviet of Primorsky District

== Bryansk Oblast ==
As of 2010, two rural localities in Bryansk Oblast bear this name:

- Peski, Surazhsky District, Bryansk Oblast, a settlement in Ovchinsky Selsoviet of Surazhsky District
- Peski, Unechsky District, Bryansk Oblast, a village in Pavlovsky Selsoviet of Unechsky District

== Kaliningrad Oblast ==
As of 2010, two rural localities in Kaliningrad Oblast bear this name:

- Peski, Ozyorsky District, Kaliningrad Oblast, a settlement in Krasnoyarsky Rural Okrug of Ozyorsky District
- Peski, Polessky District, Kaliningrad Oblast, a settlement in Zalesovsky Rural Okrug of Polessky District

== Kaluga Oblast ==
As of 2010, one rural locality in Kaluga Oblast bears this name:

- Peski, Kaluga Oblast, a village in Peremyshlsky District

== Kirov Oblast ==
As of 2010, four rural localities in Kirov Oblast bear this name:

- Peski, Kiknursky District, Kirov Oblast, a village in Tsekeyevsky Rural Okrug of Kiknursky District
- Peski, Podgorodny Rural Okrug, Orlovsky District, Kirov Oblast, a village in Podgorodny Rural Okrug of Orlovsky District
- Peski, Slobodskoy District, Kirov Oblast, a village in Svetozarevsky Rural Okrug of Slobodskoy District

== Kostroma Oblast ==
As of 2010, one rural locality in Kostroma Oblast bears this name:

- Peski, Kostroma Oblast, a village in Klevantsovskoye Settlement of Ostrovsky District

== Kurgan Oblast ==
As of 2010, three rural localities in Kurgan Oblast bear this name:

- Peski, Dalmatovsky District, Kurgan Oblast, a selo in Peskovsky Selsoviet of Dalmatovsky District
- Peski, Tselinny District, Kurgan Oblast, a selo in Vaskinsky Selsoviet of Tselinny District
- Peski, Yurgamyshsky District, Kurgan Oblast, a selo in Peskovsky Selsoviet of Yurgamyshsky District

== Kursk Oblast ==
As of 2010, two rural localities in Kursk Oblast bear this name:

- Peski, Zheleznogorsky District, Kursk Oblast, a khutor in Mikhaylovsky Selsoviet of Zheleznogorsky District

== Leningrad Oblast ==
As of 2010, five rural localities in Leningrad Oblast bear this name:

- Peski, Lomonosovsky District, Leningrad Oblast, a village in Anninskoye Settlement Municipal Formation of Lomonosovsky District
- Peski, Priozersky District, Leningrad Oblast, a logging depot settlement in Zaporozhskoye Settlement Municipal Formation of Priozersky District
- Peski, Volkhovsky District, Leningrad Oblast, a village in Kiselninskoye Settlement Municipal Formation of Volkhovsky District
- Peski, Vsevolozhsky District, Leningrad Oblast, a logging depot settlement under the administrative jurisdiction of Dubrovskoye Settlement Municipal Formation of Vsevolozhsky District
- Peski, Vyborgsky District, Leningrad Oblast, a logging depot settlement in Polyanskoye Settlement Municipal Formation of Vyborgsky District

== Moscow Oblast ==
As of 2010, five inhabited localities in Moscow Oblast bear this name.

Urban localities

- Peski, Kolomensky District, Moscow Oblast, a work settlement in Kolomensky District

Rural localities

- Peski, Dmitrovsky District, Moscow Oblast, a village in Gabovskoye Rural Settlement of Dmitrovsky District
- Peski, Shakhovskoy District, Moscow Oblast, a village in Seredinskoye Rural Settlement of Shakhovskoy District
- Peski, Shatursky District, Moscow Oblast, a selo in Dmitrovskoye Rural Settlement of Shatursky District
- Peski, Zaraysky District, Moscow Oblast, a village in Strupnenskoye Rural Settlement of Zaraysky District

== Nizhny Novgorod Oblast ==
As of 2010, two rural localities in Nizhny Novgorod Oblast bear this name:

- Peski, Koverninsky District, Nizhny Novgorod Oblast, a village in Gavrilovsky Selsoviet of Koverninsky District
- Peski, Pervomaysky District, Nizhny Novgorod Oblast, a settlement in Petrovsky Selsoviet of Pervomaysky District

== Novgorod Oblast ==
As of 2010, four rural localities in Novgorod Oblast bear this name:

- Peski, Demyansky District, Novgorod Oblast, a village in Pesotskoye Settlement of Demyansky District
- Peski, Khvoyninsky District, Novgorod Oblast, a village in Borovskoye Settlement of Khvoyninsky District
- Peski, Poddorsky District, Novgorod Oblast, a village in Poddorskoye Settlement of Poddorsky District
- Peski, Shimsky District, Novgorod Oblast, a village in Utorgoshskoye Settlement of Shimsky District

== Pskov Oblast ==
As of 2010, seven rural localities in Pskov Oblast bear this name:

- Peski, Dedovichsky District, Pskov Oblast, a village in Dedovichsky District
- Peski, Dnovsky District, Pskov Oblast, a village in Dnovsky District
- Peski, Kunyinsky District, Pskov Oblast, a village in Kunyinsky District
- Peski, Porkhovsky District, Pskov Oblast, a village in Porkhovsky District
- Peski, Pskovsky District, Pskov Oblast, a village in Pskovsky District
- Peski, Strugo-Krasnensky District, Pskov Oblast, a village in Strugo-Krasnensky District
- Peski, Velikoluksky District, Pskov Oblast, a village in Velikoluksky District

== Ryazan Oblast ==
As of 2010, one rural locality in Ryazan Oblast bears this name:

- Peski, Ryazan Oblast, a settlement in Perkinsky Rural Okrug of Spassky District

== Samara Oblast ==
As of 2010, one rural locality in Samara Oblast bears this name:

- Peski, Samara Oblast, a selo in Stavropolsky District

== Smolensk Oblast ==
As of 2010, two rural localities in Smolensk Oblast bear this name:

- Peski, Gagarinsky District, Smolensk Oblast, a village in Gagarinskoye Rural Settlement of Gagarinsky District
- Peski, Rudnyansky District, Smolensk Oblast, a village in Kruglovskoye Rural Settlement of Rudnyansky District

== Tambov Oblast ==
As of 2010, one rural locality in Tambov Oblast bears this name:

- Peski, Tambov Oblast, a settlement in Kulevatovsky Selsoviet of Sosnovsky District

== Tver Oblast ==
As of 2010, five rural localities in Tver Oblast bear this name:

- Peski, Belsky District, Tver Oblast, a village in Belsky District
- Peski, Bezhetsky District, Tver Oblast, a village in Bezhetsky District
- Peski, Ostashkovsky District, Tver Oblast, a village in Ostashkovsky District
- Peski (Kushalino Rural Settlement), Rameshkovsky District, Tver Oblast, a village in Rameshkovsky District; municipally, a part of Kushalino Rural Settlement of that district
- Peski (Vysokovo Rural Settlement), Rameshkovsky District, Tver Oblast, a village in Rameshkovsky District; municipally, a part of Vysokovo Rural Settlement of that district

== Ulyanovsk Oblast ==
As of 2010, one rural locality in Ulyanovsk Oblast bears this name:

- Peski, Ulyanovsk Oblast, a village under the administrative jurisdiction of Karsunsky Settlement Okrug of Karsunsky District

== Vladimir Oblast ==
As of 2010, two rural localities in Vladimir Oblast bear this name:

- Peski, Petushinsky District, Vladimir Oblast, a village in Petushinsky District
- Peski, Vyaznikovsky District, Vladimir Oblast, a village in Vyaznikovsky District

== Volgograd Oblast ==
As of 2010, one rural locality in Volgograd Oblast bears this name:

- Peski, Volgograd Oblast, a settlement in Sovkhozsky Selsoviet of Nikolayevsky District

== Vologda Oblast ==
As of 2010, three rural localities in Vologda Oblast bear this name:

- Peski, Kirillovsky District, Vologda Oblast, a village in Sukhoverkhovsky Selsoviet of Kirillovsky District
- Peski, Nyuksensky District, Vologda Oblast, a village in Igmassky Selsoviet of Nyuksensky District
- Peski, Vologodsky District, Vologda Oblast, a village in Nefedovsky Selsoviet of Vologodsky District

== Voronezh Oblast ==
As of 2010, four rural localities in Voronezh Oblast bear this name:

- Peski, Novokhopyorsky District, Voronezh Oblast, a settlement in Kolenovskoye Rural Settlement of Novokhopyorsky District
- Peski, Pavlovsky District, Voronezh Oblast, a selo in Peskovskoye Rural Settlement of Pavlovsky District
- Peski, Petropavlovsky District, Voronezh Oblast, a selo in Peskovskoye Rural Settlement of Petropavlovsky District
- Peski, Povorinsky District, Voronezh Oblast, a selo in Peskovskoye Rural Settlement of Povorinsky District

== Yaroslavl Oblast ==
As of 2010, two rural localities in Yaroslavl Oblast bear this name:

- Peski, Nekrasovsky District, Yaroslavl Oblast, a village in Diyevo-Gorodishchensky Rural Okrug of Nekrasovsky District
- Peski, Pereslavsky District, Yaroslavl Oblast, a village in Lychensky Rural Okrug of Pereslavsky District

== Zabaykalsky Krai ==
As of 2010, one rural locality in Zabaykalsky Krai bears this name:

- Peski, Zabaykalsky Krai, a selo in Petrovsk-Zabaykalsky District

== See also ==
- Pisky (disambiguation)
