= Vladimir Retunsky =

Russian serial killer and rapist (born 1950)

- Born: Vladimir Nikolaevich Retunsky; 4 February 1950 (age 76); Povorino, Voronezh Oblast, RSFSR, Soviet Union
- Other names: "The Povorino Maniac" "The Chikatilo of Khopyor River" "The Voronezh Chikatilo"
- Conviction: Murder
- Penalty: 5.5 years imprisonment (1978 rape); 3 years imprisonment (1986 negligent homicide); Death; commuted to 15 years imprisonment and released in 2012 (murders); 5 years imprisonment (theft charges)

Details
- Victims: 9–13
- Span of crimes: 1986–1996
- Country: Soviet Union, later Russia
- States: Voronezh, Vologda
- Date apprehended: 15 February 1997

Vladimir Nikolaevich Retunsky (Russian: Влади́мир Никола́евич Рету́нский; born 4 February 1950), known as The Povorino Maniac (Russian: Поворинский маньяк), is a Soviet–Russian serial killer and rapist who raped and murdered at least 8 young women in Voronezh and Vologda Oblasts between 1990 and 1996. He had previous convictions for rape and negligent homicide.

After his detainment in 1997, Retunsky was convicted and sentenced to death, but had his sentence commuted to 15 years imprisonment due changes in the Criminal Code of Russia. He was released in 2012 and has since recanted most of his confessions except for two of the murders, which he claims were caused by negligence.

== Early life ==
Retunsky was born on 4 February 1950, in the town of Povorino, Voronezh Oblast, RSFSR. At the time of his birth, his father suffered from chronic tuberculosis while his mother had cancer, as a result of which the young boy had to be brought up by his older sister, Alexandra. Due to his small stature, Retunsky avoided fights and flirting with girls, and reportedly slept in the same bed as his sister.

Throughout his youth, he experienced several events that would change impact his mental health. Two of these happened at the age of ten – after falling off a tree, Retunsky was confined to a bed for about a week and had reoccurring nightmares of somebody strangling him, often causing him to wake up screaming. Sometime after this, he heard that a neighbor died by suicide, after which he attempted to do the same, but was caught by his father and was spanked.

Between 1958 and 1966, he studied at the First School in Povorino before enrolling at a vocational school to study as a mechanic. He was later drafted into the Soviet Army and served with the Soviet Border Troops on the border with Iran. In 1973, he moved to Moscow for work and got a job as a crane operator at the Moscow Metallurgical Plant. There, he fell in love with a female colleague, whom he later married and had two children named Igor and Olesya.

=== First crimes ===
In 1978, Retunsky was convicted of a raping his wife while threatening her with a knife in the Lefortovo District, for which he was ordered to serve a 5.5-year prison sentence at a high-security colony in Voronezh's Paninsky District. He was paroled for good behavior in 1980 and transferred to the North to do penal labor at a construction site. While there, he met a saleswoman named Lyudmila Galina, who had a son from a previous marriage. The two became romantically engaged and Retunsky eventually married her, with the newlyweds returning to Povorino together.

On Easter Day in 1986, Retunsky got into an argument with his niece's husband, Nikolai Zhuravlyov – during the scuffle, he stabbed the man seven times, killing him in the process. He claimed at his later trial that Zhuravlyov had grabbed the knife first and had lunged at him, a claim supported by his relatives. He was convicted of negligent homicide and sentenced to 3 years imprisonment, which he served in full.

After his release, Retunsky returned to Povorino and found work as a driver for a local procurement office. Despite his criminal convictions, he was regarded positively in his hometown, as the residents considered him a model family man who loved his wife, children and grandchildren, and was known as the local jack of all trades.

== Murders ==
=== Modus operandi ===
Between 1990 and 1996, Retunsky killed at least eight young girls and women, divided into two "periods" from 1990 to 1991, and later from 1995 to 1996. He almost always targeted young, blonde hitchhikers whom he took to isolated locations where he would tie them up, rape them, and then kill them either by strangulation or stabbing. In some cases, he disposed of the victims' bodies in nearby bodies of water, while in others he ripped open their stomachs. In each murder, he is known to have caused to either stab or sever his victims' breasts.

=== First period ===
On 14 June 1990, Retunsky was driving an Izh 2715 around Povorino when he was stopped at the intersection of Transportnaya and Zhukova Streets by 20-year-old Ekaterina Pastushkova, a waitress at the Yubileynoye Café, who asked him to give her a ride. Retunsky agreed, but instead of transporting Pastushkova to her desired destination, he instead drove to the woods, where he tied her up and dragged her out his car. He then raped and strangled her before burying her body in the woodlands.

On 7 December, he was driving around the city in his company-issued ZIL-130 when he stopped by his wife's workplace at the No. 19 food store on Sovetskaya Street. There, 17-year-old apprentice sales clerk Tatyana Glukhovskaya asked him to give her a ride, to which Retunsky agreed. However, he instead drove to the banks of the Svintsovka River, where he tied up and raped Glukhovskaya, before strangling her to death and throwing her body into the river. The disfigured body was found in April 1991.

On 4 July 1991, while driving through Povorino in the company car, Retunsky started following 16-year-old student Rimma Grigorieva until she reached her home. When he made sure that there were no adults around, he broke into the house, tied her up, raped Grigorieva and then strangled her with a rope. He then transported the body to the Svintsovka River, stabbed it with a knife, cut off her breasts, cut open her stomach and threw the body into the river. The mutilated body was later discovered by local fishermen.

=== Second period ===
On 19 May 1995, Retunsky was driving the company car to the village of Baychurovo when he noticed schoolgirls Lyudmila Fedorova and Olga Podzorova, both 14, riding their bicycles in the direction of Samodurovka. Fedorova and Podzorova's bodies were found two days later.

On 24 May 1996, Retunsky was driving his personal Zhiguli around the settlement of Novonikolayevsky in Volgograd Oblast when he spotted 23-year-old teacher Oksana Yurina. After learning that she lived on a farm in Dvoynovsky, he offered to give her a ride – once Yurina entered his vehicle, he tied her up and drove to a nearby forest, where he raped and then strangled her with a rope. After killing her, Retunsky buried the body nearby.

On 17 July, Retunsky was driving around Novonikolayevsky again when he saw 21-year-old student Olga Ivakina hitchhiking on the outskirts of the settlement. Ivakina asked him to drop her off at a farm in Duplyatsky, but he instead tied her up and drove her to the same forest he had previously killed Yurina in, where he raped and killed his new victim in an identical manner.

On 6 November, Retunsky was returning home from to Povorino after making a delivery in the village of Anna. After passing by Gribanovsky, he was stopped by 18-year-old student Oksana Redneva, who asked him if he could give her a lift to the Novokhopyorsky District. Retunsky agreed, but after driving for about half a kilometer, he tied Redneva up and proceeded to rape and strangle her with a rope, failing to kill her. He then dragged the body to the nearby woods and stab her until she died. He then left the body there, where it was discovered six days later.

=== Investigation ===
After the bodies of Glukhovskaya and Grigorieva were found in Povorino, locals spread rumors that a serial killer was active in the area. This was initially not taken seriously by investigators, but as the disappearances and murders continued, they combined all the cases into one in late 1996. A task force was formed to apprehend the killer and biological materials were collected from the crime scenes in an attempt to determine the man's blood type.

During the investigation, psychiatrist Alexander Sednev compiled a psychological portrait of the supposed serial killer, which later on proved to be an almost identical match to Retunsky. In his profile, Sednev supposed that the perpetrator was a sturdy man with a pleasant appearance who knew how to talk to women; likely drove a truck, as he was able to kidnap the two girls with bicycles; was likely from the area or worked there; enjoyed the feeling of helplessness and superiority over his victims; killed for the sake of murder and to cover up the rapes; had sadistic tendencies due to the disfigurements inflicted on the victims; kept stolen jewelry as trophies; was likely an ex-convict and had a family that is probably dominated by his mother or his wife.

== Arrest and confessions ==
After several months of investigation, investigators learned that Ivakina had brought a Rottweiler puppy from Moscow – at the time, this was a breed rarely seen in rural areas of Voronezh and Volgograd. Officers started asking residents around the various villages if they had seen such a puppy, with one of them reporting that they had seen one in possession of Evgeny Galin – Retunsky's stepson, who lived with him and worked at the same workplace. In February 1997, Galin was detained and questioned, after which he stated that the puppy was given to him by his stepdad. Upon learning that Evgeny had been detained, Retunsky gave himself up on 15 February and willingly confessed to the murders. After his arrest, the crimes stopped.

While searching through Retunsky's house, officers found a collection of videotapes with pornographic films and several notebooks with poems about love, as well as jewelry and personal items that were identified as belonging to the victims. When they looked through his ZIL-130, it was found that the handle of the right door had been screwed off, which could prevent anybody from opening it from the inside. In addition, more items were found in the truck's cabin that were identified as belonging to the victims.

During subsequent investigative experiments, Retunsky showed the burial sites of Pastushkova, Yurina and Ivakina, and even pointed out places where he intended to bury future victims. He also admitted to two additional murders he supposedly committed somewhere within the Povorinsky District in the summer of 1994, but he was not charged with them due to a lack of evidence. Retunsky later recanted his confessions except for the two murders in Volgograd, which he claimed were by accident, and proclaimed that he had incriminated himself because he "wanted to be famous".

The investigation into the crimes lasted approximately a year, and the authorities eventually charged Retunsky with 8 rapes and murders committed in the two separate periods: between 1990 and 1991, and between 1995 and 1996. The law enforcement agencies and media in Voronezh both believed that he likely killed others, suspecting that he killed a total of 12.

=== Trial, sentence and imprisonment ===
In February 1999, the case materials were submitted to the court, while Retunsky himself was ordered to undergo a forensic psychiatric examination at a hospital in Voronezh. The commission, chaired by Professor Mikhail Burkov, found that he was sane and capable of standing trial, after which Retunsky was transferred to a holding facility. While in there, he attempted (or faked to attempt) suicide by sticking a 10-centimeter nail in his ear.

He had to be guarded heavily to avoid any lynching attempt from his fellow countrymen, and the trial was held in a closed court with Retunsky being guarded by multiple armed police officers. On 6 May 1999, the Voronezh Regional Court found him guilty on all counts and sentenced him to death. However, at the time of the trial, President Boris Yeltsin announced an official moratorium on the death penalty, which automatically meant that the sentence had been commuted to be maximum available alternative sentence. In December 1999, the Supreme Court commuted Retunsky's death sentence to 15 years imprisonment, the maximum available sentence at the time taking into account two years of detainment as time served.

== Imprisonment and release ==
Following his conviction, Retunsky was transferred to serve his sentence at the Vladimir Central Prison before being moved to Penal Colony No. 9 in Borisoglebsk. He was released on 14 February 2012 and settled with his sister in the village of Peski, where he was placed on probation for six years. Retunsky was forbidden to leave his home from 22:00 to 6:00, to visit entertainment venues and to leave the Povorinsky District. As an additional measurement for security, the relatives of his victims were in witness protection.

Five months after his release, Retunsky was arrested again, this time for stealing 1.5 thousand rubles from his neighbor. He was convicted of theft and sentenced to 5 years imprisonment, which he served at the Semiluk Colony in Voronezh Oblast. He was granted parole on 22 July 2015.

On 17 September 2015, NTV aired the program "Talk and Show" (Russian: Говорим и показываем), featuring an interview with Retunsky, as well as participation from several family members of his confirmed and alleged victims. In it, he continued to assert that he was innocent. He continued to give interviews to news publications and a YouTubers after this, stating that he was tired of living by himself and was afraid that he would be wrongfully accused of something and imprisoned again.

As of 2025, Retunsky continues to live in Povorino with his pet cat, and is generally avoided by the locals. His sister Alexandra died in 2013.

=== Questions of innocence ===
After the bodies of Glukhovskaya and Grigorieva were found, the police initially arrested four young men in Povorino on suspicion of killing them. They soon confessed to the murders, but later recanted their testimonies, claiming that they had been tortured by the police. However, an internal investigation concluded that no such methods were used by the officers. In March 1992, the case was transferred to the Voronezh Regional Court, but after several sessions, it was returned to the Prosecutor's Office for further investigation. In 1993, the case was terminated, and the four men were released.

=== Unsolved murders ===
The two murders to which Retunsky confessed to committing in 1994 were those of Maria Mitina and Ilona Petashko, both of whom were murdered in the summer of 1994. Mitina disappeared sometime around 23 June, with her body found on 9 August near the village of Mokhovoye. On 4 August, the 16-year-old Petashko, who had come to Povorino to visit some relatives, suddenly disappeared, with her brother finding her personal items and bicycle on a railroad bridge overlooking the Khopyor River. Twenty days later, her body was found in the Otrog forest area. Unlike Retunsky's known victims, medical examiners were unable to determine what the two victims' causes of death were, or whether they were raped.

At the end of August 1994, police arrested 21-year-old paroled rapist Mikhail Garibov for the murder of Petashko, after her brother and a female friend reported to the police that he had picked her up at a disco on 30 July and that he had molested her in the garden of the House of Pioneers on the following day. While combing through the crime scene, investigators located tire tracks belonging to a Moskvitch and traces of shoes with ribbed soles similar to the ones found in Garibov's home. According to the investigators, it was possible that Garibov abducted Petashko and drove her to a location called "Kozyi Plazh", where he killed her after a failed rape attempt and then disposed of the body in the forest area.

After his arrest, Garibov initially confessed to the murders, but in late September 1994, he recanted his testimony and claimed that he had been beaten by the interrogators. Instead, he claimed to have never met Mitina and that he was out fishing on the day of Petashko's murder. A subsequent internal investigation conducted against the Povorino Police Department found no evidence of them abusing Garibov in any way. In the end, the charges for Mitina's murder were dropped after it was learned that on the day of her disappearance, Garibov's father's Moskvitch was under repair. However, in April 1995, he was tried and found guilty of the Petashko murder and sentenced to 14 years imprisonment.

Later on, when Retunsky confessed to both of the murders, he gave a detailed account of both crime scenes, but he was nonetheless not indicted due to a lack of evidence. In regards to the Mitina case, it was found that he had an alibi, as he was found to have traveled to Semiluki on the day of her disappearance, which was further corroborated by multiple documents and receipts from a gas station located at the other end of the area where Mitina was last seen. However, one theory that proposed that Mitina was actually abducted and murdered on a different day, explaining this seeming discrepancy.

In 2008, Garibov was released and returned to Povorino, but was arrested for rape the following year and incarcerated. Following his release for that crime, he moved to Kaliningrad, Kaliningrad Oblast, where he was arrested for yet another rape in 2015.

== See also ==
- List of Russian serial killers
- List of serial killers by number of victims
