= Novonikolayevsky (inhabited locality) =

Novonikolayevsky (Russian: Новоникола́евский; masculine), Novonikolayevskaya (Новоникола́евская; feminine), or Novonikolayevskoye (Новоникола́евское; neuter) is the name of several inhabited localities in Russia.

Urban localities

- Novonikolayevsky, Volgograd Oblast, a work settlement in Novonikolayevsky District of Volgograd Oblast

Rural localities

- Novonikolayevsky, Republic of Bashkortostan, a village in Naumovsky Selsoviet of Sterlitamaksky District of the Republic of Bashkortostan
- Novonikolayevsky, Pochepsky District, Bryansk Oblast, a settlement in Milechsky Selsoviet of Pochepsky District of Bryansk Oblast
- Novonikolayevsky, Vygonichsky District, Bryansk Oblast, a settlement in Khmelevsky Selsoviet of Vygonichsky District of Bryansk Oblast
- Novonikolayevsky, Kursk Oblast, a settlement in Razvetyevsky Selsoviet of Zheleznogorsky District of Kursk Oblast
- Novonikolayevsky, Nizhny Novgorod Oblast, a settlement in Kochkurovsky Selsoviet of Pochinkovsky District of Nizhny Novgorod Oblast
- Novonikolayevsky, Martynovsky District, Rostov Oblast, a khutor in Rubashkinskoye Rural Settlement of Martynovsky District of Rostov Oblast
- Novonikolayevsky, Tatsinsky District, Rostov Oblast, a khutor in Verkhneoblivskoye Rural Settlement of Tatsinsky District of Rostov Oblast
- Novonikolayevsky, Verkhnedonskoy District, Rostov Oblast, a khutor in Shumilinskoye Rural Settlement of Verkhnedonskoy District of Rostov Oblast
- Novonikolayevsky, Saratov Oblast, a settlement in Balakovsky District of Saratov Oblast
- Novonikolayevsky, Republic of Tatarstan, a settlement in Zelenodolsky District of the Republic of Tatarstan
- Novonikolayevsky, Voronezh Oblast, a khutor in Bodeyevskoye Rural Settlement of Liskinsky District of Voronezh Oblast
- Novonikolayevskoye, Republic of Bashkortostan, a selo in Mrakovsky Selsoviet of Kugarchinsky District of the Republic of Bashkortostan
- Novonikolayevskoye, Krasnoyarsk Krai, a village in Soloukhinsky Selsoviet of Pirovsky District of Krasnoyarsk Krai
- Novonikolayevskoye, Novgorod Oblast, a village in Savinskoye Settlement of Novgorodsky District of Novgorod Oblast
- Novonikolayevskoye, Vladimir Oblast, a village in Melenkovsky District of Vladimir Oblast
- Novonikolayevskaya, a stanitsa in Novonikolayevsky Rural Okrug of Kalininsky District of Krasnodar Krai
