= Sapozhok =

Set index of articles associated with the same name

Sapozhok (Russian: Сапожок) is the name of several inhabited localities in Russia.

Urban localities

- Sapozhok, Ryazan Oblast, a work settlement in Sapozhkovsky District of Ryazan Oblast

Rural localities

- Sapozhok, Saratov Oblast, a selo in Rtishchevsky District of Saratov Oblast
- Sapozhok, Volgograd Oblast, a khutor in Mirny Selsoviet of Novonikolayevsky District of Volgograd Oblast
- Sapozhok, Voronezh Oblast, a khutor in Chistopolyanskoye Rural Settlement of Ramonsky District of Voronezh Oblast
