= Nizhnekardailsky =

Nizhnekardailsky Нижнекардаильский
- Khutor
- Location within Volgograd Oblast Location within Russia
- Coordinates: 50°52′N 42°44′E
- Country: Russia
- Region: Volgograd Oblast
- District: Novonikolayevsky District
- Time zone: UTC+4:00

Nizhnekardailsky (Russian: Нижнекардаильский) is a rural locality (a khutor) in Kulikovskoye Rural Settlement, Novonikolayevsky District, Volgograd Oblast, Russia. The population was 91 as of 2010. There are 5 streets.

== Geography ==
Nizhnekardailsky is located in forest steppe, on the Khopyorsko-Buzulukskaya Plain, on the right bank of the Kardail River, 36 km southeast of Novonikolayevsky (the district's administrative centre) by road. Kikvidze is the nearest rural locality.
