= Kuli, Zabaykalsky Krai =

Kuli Кули
- Selo
- Location within Zabaykalsky Krai Location within Russia
- Coordinates: 51°08′N 109°02′E
- Country: Russia
- Region: Zabaykalsky Krai
- District: Petrovsk-Zabaykalsky District
- Time zone: UTC+9:00

Kuli (Russian: Кули) is a rural locality (a selo) in Petrovsk-Zabaykalsky District, Zabaykalsky Krai, Russia. Population: 167 (2021 census); 230 (2010 census); 303 (2002 census); There are 8 streets in this selo.

== Geography ==
This rural locality is located 21 km from Petrovsk-Zabaykalsky (the district's administrative centre), 327 km from Chita (capital of Zabaykalsky Krai) and 5,010 km from Moscow. Tarbagatay is the nearest rural locality.
