= Sokhotoy =

Sokhotoy Сохотой
- Selo
- Location within Zabaykalsky Krai Location within Russia
- Coordinates: 50°48′N 108°21′E
- Country: Russia
- Region: Zabaykalsky Krai
- District: Petrovsk-Zabaykalsky District
- Time zone: UTC+9:00

Sokhotoy (Russian: Сохотой) is a rural locality (a selo) in Petrovsk-Zabaykalsky District, Zabaykalsky Krai, Russia. Population: 88 (2021 census); 97 (2010 census); 116 (2002 census); There are 5 streets in this selo.

== Geography ==
This rural locality is located 62 km from Petrovsk-Zabaykalsky (the district's administrative centre), 386 km from Chita (capital of Zabaykalsky Krai) and 5,000 km from Moscow. Novonikolskoye is the nearest rural locality.
