= Alexey Galakhov =

Russian author (1807–1892)

- Андре′й Гала′хов
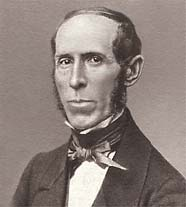
- Born: Alexey Dmitrievich Galakhov; January 13, 1807; Sapozhok, Ryazan Governorate, Russian Empire
- Died: November 16, 1892 (aged 85); Saint Petersburg, Russian Empire
- Occupations: literary historian critic pedagogue author
- Awards: The Uvarov Prize

Alexey Dmitrievich Galakhov (Russian: Алексе́й Дми́триевич Гала́хов; January 13, 1807 – November 16, 1892) was a Russian author and literary historian, best known for his Russian Reader for Children (1842), and The History of Russian Literature, Old and New (1863–1875).

== Biography ==
Galakhov was born in 1807 in Sapozhok.

He was a professor at the Saint Petersburg History and Philology Institute, contributed regularly to numerous high profile magazines, most notably, Andrey Krayevsky's Otechestvennye Zapiski. There, from 1839 until 1856, he published more than 900 articles and reviews, occasionally under the pseudonym Sto Odin (One Hundred and One). He was the author of several novelettes and books of memoirs.

He died in 1892 in Saint Petersburg.

== Selected bibliography ==
=== Non-fiction ===
- The Russian Reader for Children (1842)
- The History of the Russian Literature, Old and New (1863–1875)

=== Fiction ===
- The Old Mirror (Staroye zerkalo, Старое зеркало, 1845)
- The Error (Oshibka, Ошибка, 1846)
- Puppet Comedy (Kukolnaya komediya, Кукольная комедия, 1847)
- Transformation (Prevrashcheniye, Превращение, 1847)

=== Memoirs ===
- From the Notes of One Man (Из записок человека, 1847–1848)
- My Contribution to Magazines (Моё сотрудничество в журналах, 1886)
- The Moscow Literary Coffee-House in 1830s-1840s (Литературная кофейня в Москве в 1830–1840-х гг., 1886)
- The 1840s (Сороковые годы, 1892)
