= Serp i Molot, Volgograd Oblast =

Serp i Molot Серп и Молот
- Settlement
- Location within Volgograd Oblast Location within Russia
- Coordinates: 50°51′N 42°29′E
- Country: Russia
- Region: Volgograd Oblast
- District: Novonikolayevsky District
- Time zone: UTC+4:00

Serp i Molot (Russian: Серп и Молот) is a rural locality (a settlement) and the administrative center of Serpo-Molotskoye Rural Settlement, Novonikolayevsky District, Volgograd Oblast, Russia. The population was 875 as of 2010. There are 13 streets.

== Geography ==
Serp i Molot is located in steppe, on the Khopyorsko-Buzulukskaya Plai, 24 km southeast of Novonikolayevsky (the district's administrative centre) by road. Kulikovsky is the nearest rural locality.
