= Lazorevsky =

Lazorevsky Лазоревский
- Khutor
- Location within Volgograd Oblast Location within Russia
- Coordinates: 51°03′N 43°06′E
- Country: Russia
- Region: Volgograd Oblast
- District: Novonikolayevsky District
- Time zone: UTC+4:00

Lazorevsky (Russian: Лазоревский) is a rural locality (a khutor) in Krasnoarmeyskoye Rural Settlement, Novonikolayevsky District, Volgograd Oblast, Russia. The population was 77 as of 2010. There are 4 streets.

== Geography ==
Lazorevsky is located in steppe, on the Khopyorsko-Buzulukskaya Plain, 67 km northeast of Novonikolayevsky (the district's administrative centre) by road. Aleksandrovka is the nearest rural locality.
