= Novoberezovsky =

Novoberezovsky Новоберезовский
- Settlement
- Location within Volgograd Oblast Location within Russia
- Coordinates: 51°04′N 43°00′E
- Country: Russia
- Region: Volgograd Oblast
- District: Novonikolayevsky District
- Time zone: UTC+4:00

Novoberezovsky (Russian: Новоберезовский) is a rural locality (a settlement) in Krasnoarmeyskoye Rural Settlement, Novonikolayevsky District, Volgograd Oblast, Russia. The population was 52 as of 2010. There are 3 streets.

== Geography ==
Novoberezovsky is located in steppe, on the Khopyorsko-Buzulukskaya Plain, 60 km northeast of Novonikolayevsky (the district's administrative centre) by road. Lazorevsky is the nearest rural locality.
