= Korolevsky =

Korolevsky Королевский
- Khutor
- Location within Volgograd Oblast Location within Russia
- Coordinates: 51°03′N 42°17′E
- Country: Russia
- Region: Volgograd Oblast
- District: Novonikolayevsky District
- Time zone: UTC+4:00

Korolevsky (Russian: Королевский) is a rural locality (a khutor) in Novonikolayevskoye Rural Settlement, Novonikolayevsky District, Volgograd Oblast, Russia. The population was 79 as of 2010.

== Geography ==
Korolevsky is located 12 km northwest of Novonikolayevsky (the district's administrative centre) by road. Gosplodopitomnik is the nearest rural locality.
