= Ust-Obor =

Ust-Obor Усть-Обор
- Selo
- Location within Zabaykalsky Krai Location within Russia
- Coordinates: 50°00′N 108°00′E
- Country: Russia
- Region: Zabaykalsky Krai
- District: Petrovsk-Zabaykalsky District
- Time zone: UTC+9:00

Ust-Obor (Russian: Усть-Обор) is a rural locality (a selo) in Petrovsk-Zabaykalsky District, Zabaykalsky Krai, Russia. Population: 761 (2021 census); 836 (2010 census); 852 (2002 census); There are 10 streets in this selo.

== Geography ==
This rural locality is located 43 km from Petrovsk-Zabaykalsky (the district's administrative centre), 366 km from Chita (capital of Zabaykalsky Krai) and 5,001 km from Moscow. Obor is the nearest rural locality.
