= Novaya Zardama =

Novaya Zardama Новая Зардама
- Selo
- Location within Zabaykalsky Krai Location within Russia
- Coordinates: 50°47′N 108°10′E
- Country: Russia
- Region: Zabaykalsky Krai
- District: Petrovsk-Zabaykalsky District
- Time zone: UTC+9:00

Novaya Zardama (Russian: Новая Зардама) is a rural locality (a selo) in Petrovsk-Zabaykalsky District, Zabaykalsky Krai, Russia. Population: 103 (2021 census); 121 (2010 census); 149 (2002 census); There are 4 streets in this selo.

== Geography ==
This rural locality is located 72 km from Petrovsk-Zabaykalsky (the district's administrative centre), 400 km from Chita (capital of Zabaykalsky Krai) and 4,990 km from Moscow. Potanino is the nearest rural locality.
