= Obor, Zabaykalsky Krai =

Obor Обор
- Selo
- Location within Zabaykalsky Krai Location within Russia
- Coordinates: 50°58′N 108°32′E
- Country: Russia
- Region: Zabaykalsky Krai
- District: Petrovsk-Zabaykalsky District
- Time zone: UTC+9:00

Obor (Russian: Обор) is a rural locality (a selo) in Petrovsk-Zabaykalsky District, Zabaykalsky Krai, Russia. Population: 157 (2021 census); 186 (2010 census); 205 (2002 census); There is 1 street in this selo.

== Geography ==
This rural locality is located 40 km from Petrovsk-Zabaykalsky (the district's administrative centre), 367 km from Chita (capital of Zabaykalsky Krai) and 4,995 km from Moscow. Ust-Obor is the nearest rural locality.
