= Khokhotuy =

Khokhotuy Хохотуй
- Selo
- Location within Zabaykalsky Krai Location within Russia
- Coordinates: 51°17′N 109°33′E
- Country: Russia
- Region: Zabaykalsky Krai
- District: Petrovsk-Zabaykalsky District
- Time zone: UTC+9:00

Khokhotuy (Russian: Хохотуй) is a rural locality (a selo) in Petrovsk-Zabaykalsky District, Zabaykalsky Krai, Russia. Population: 1,305 (2021 census); 1,590 (2010 census); 1,846 (2002 census); There are 20 streets in this selo.

== Geography ==
This rural locality is located 50 km from Petrovsk-Zabaykalsky (the district's administrative centre), 286 km from Chita (capital of Zabaykalsky Krai) and 5,028 km from Moscow. Kirpichny is the nearest rural locality.
