= Gosplodopitomnik =

Gosplodopitomnik Госплодопитомник
- Settlement
- Location within Volgograd Oblast Location within Russia
- Coordinates: 51°03′N 42°16′E
- Country: Russia
- Region: Volgograd Oblast
- District: Novonikolayevsky District
- Time zone: UTC+4:00

Gosplodopitomnik (Russian: Госплодопитомник) is a rural locality (a settlement) in Novonikolayevskoye Rural Settlement, Novonikolayevsky District, Volgograd Oblast, Russia. The population was 3 as of 2010.

== Geography ==
Gosplodopitomnik is located in steppe, on the Khopyorsko-Buzulukskaya Plain, 21 km northwest of Novonikolayevsky (the district's administrative centre) by road. Korolevsky is the nearest rural locality.
