= Orsuk =

Orsuk Орсук
- Selo
- Location within Zabaykalsky Krai Location within Russia
- Coordinates: 50°57′N 108°48′E
- Country: Russia
- Region: Zabaykalsky Krai
- District: Petrovsk-Zabaykalsky District
- Time zone: UTC+9:00

Orsuk (Russian: Орсук) is a rural locality (a selo) in Petrovsk-Zabaykalsky District, Zabaykalsky Krai, Russia. Population: 200 (2021 census); 213 (2010 census); 213 (2002 census); There are 2 streets in this selo.

== Geography ==
This rural locality is located 35 km from Petrovsk-Zabaykalsky (the district's administrative centre), 350 km from Chita (capital of Zabaykalsky Krai) and 5,015 km from Moscow. Kandobayevo is the nearest rural locality.
