= Chigari, Volgograd Oblast =

Chigari Чигари
- Khutor
- Location within Volgograd Oblast Location within Russia
- Coordinates: 51°00′N 42°47′E
- Country: Russia
- Region: Volgograd Oblast
- District: Novonikolayevsky District
- Time zone: UTC+4:00

Chigari (Russian: Чигари) is a rural locality (a khutor) in Khopyorskoye Rural Settlement, Novonikolayevsky District, Volgograd Oblast, Russia. The population was 304 as of 2010. There are 6 streets.

== Geography ==
Chigari is located in steppe, on the Khopyorsko-Buzulukskaya Plain, 21 km northeast of Novonikolayevsky (the district's administrative centre) by road. Novokardailsky is the nearest rural locality.
