= Ilmen, Voronezh Oblast =

Ilmen Ильмень
- Selo
- Location within Voronezh Oblast Location within Russia
- Coordinates: 51°18′N 42°33′E
- Country: Russia
- Region: Voronezh Oblast
- District: Povorinsky District

Population
  - Total: 390
- Time zone: UTC+3:00

Ilmen (Russian: Ильмень) is a rural locality (a selo) in Mazurskoye Rural Settlement, Povorinsky District, Voronezh Oblast, Russia. The population was 390 as of 2010. There are 5 streets.

== Geography ==
Ilmen is located 37 km northeast of Povorino (the district's administrative centre) by road. Mazurka is the nearest rural locality.

== Climate ==
Ilmen is located in Voronezh Oblast, Russia, which has a humid continental climate according to the Köppen climate classification (Dfb). This climate type is characterized by long, cold winters and warm to hot summers, with significant temperature variation throughout the year.
