= Krasnaya Dolina =

Selo in Zabaykalsky Krai, Russia

Krasnaya Dolina Красная Долина
- Selo
- Location within Zabaykalsky Krai Location within Russia
- Coordinates: 50°49′N 108°15′E
- Country: Russia
- Region: Zabaykalsky Krai
- District: Petrovsk-Zabaykalsky District
- Time zone: UTC+9:00

Krasnaya Dolina (Russian: Красная Долина) is a rural locality (a selo) in Petrovsk-Zabaykalsky District, Zabaykalsky Krai, Russia. Population: 133 (2021 census); 172 (2010 census); 183 (2002 census); There are 4 streets in this selo.

== Geography ==
This rural locality is located 65 km from Petrovsk-Zabaykalsky (the district's administrative centre), 392 km from Chita (capital of Zabaykalsky Krai) and 4,993 km from Moscow. Novonikolskoye is the nearest rural locality.
