= Kukun, Zabaykalsky Krai =

Kukun Кукун
- Selo
- Location within Zabaykalsky Krai Location within Russia
- Coordinates: 50°58′N 108°54′E
- Country: Russia
- Region: Zabaykalsky Krai
- District: Petrovsk-Zabaykalsky District
- Time zone: UTC+9:00

Kukun (Russian: Кукун) is a rural locality (a selo) in Petrovsk-Zabaykalsky District, Zabaykalsky Krai, Russia. Population: 4 (2010 census); 6 (2002 census); There is 1 street in this selo.

== Geography ==
This rural locality is located 33 km from Petrovsk-Zabaykalsky (the district's administrative centre), 342 km from Chita (capital of Zabaykalsky Krai) and 5,020 km from Moscow. Katangar is the nearest rural locality.
