= Mazurka, Voronezh Oblast =

Mazurka Мазурка
- Selo
- Location within Voronezh Oblast Location within Russia
- Coordinates: 51°16′N 42°33′E
- Country: Russia
- Region: Voronezh Oblast
- District: Povorinsky District
- Time zone: UTC+3:00

Mazurka (Russian: Мазурка) is a rural locality (a selo) and the administrative center of Mazurskoye Rural Settlement, Povorinsky District, Voronezh Oblast, Russia. The population was 1,577 as of 2010. There are 15 streets.

== Geography ==
Mazurka is located 30 km northeast of Povorino (the district's administrative centre) by road. Peski is the nearest rural locality.
