= Khopyorsky =

Khopyorsky Хопёрский
- Settlement
- Location within Volgograd Oblast Location within Russia
- Coordinates: 51°00′N 42°47′E
- Country: Russia
- Region: Volgograd Oblast
- District: Novonikolayevsky District
- Time zone: UTC+4:00

Khopyorskyv (Russian: Хопёрский) is a rural locality (a settlement) and the administrative center of Khopyorskoye Rural Settlement, Novonikolayevsky District, Volgograd Oblast, Russia. The population was 394 as of 2010. There are 17 streets.

== Geography ==
Khopyorsky is located in steppe, on the Khopyorsko-Buzulukskaya Plain, 39 km east of Novonikolayevsky (the district's administrative centre) by road. Priovrazhny is the nearest rural locality.
