= Kleyevsky =

Kleyevsky Клеевский
- Khutor
- Location within Volgograd Oblast Location within Russia
- Coordinates: 51°01′N 42°32′E
- Country: Russia
- Region: Volgograd Oblast
- District: Novonikolayevsky District
- Time zone: UTC+4:00

Kleyevsky (Russian: Клеевский) is a rural locality (a khutor) in Komsomolskoye Rural Settlement, Novonikolayevsky District, Volgograd Oblast, Russia. The population was 47 as of 2010.

== Geography ==
Kleyevsky is located in steppe, on the Khopyorsko-Buzulukskaya Plain, near the Kleyevsky pond, 16 km northeast of Novonikolayevsky (the district's administrative centre) by road. Komsomolsky is the nearest rural locality.
