= Katangar =

Katangar Катангар
- Selo
- Location within Zabaykalsky Krai Location within Russia
- Coordinates: 50°00′N 108°00′E
- Country: Russia
- Region: Zabaykalsky Krai
- District: Petrovsk-Zabaykalsky District
- Time zone: UTC+9:00

Katangar (Russian: Катангар) is a rural locality (a selo) in Petrovsk-Zabaykalsky District, Zabaykalsky Krai, Russia. Population: 113 (2021 census); 158 (2010 census); 179 (2002 census); There are 3 streets in this selo.

== Geography ==
This rural locality is located 30 km from Petrovsk-Zabaykalsky (the district's administrative centre), 337 km from Chita (capital of Zabaykalsky Krai) and 5,019 km from Moscow. Lesouchastok Katangar is the nearest rural locality.
