= Kirkhinsky =

Kirkhinsky Кирхинский
- Khutor
- Location within Volgograd Oblast Location within Russia
- Coordinates: 50°54′N 42°31′E
- Country: Russia
- Region: Volgograd Oblast
- District: Novonikolayevsky District
- Time zone: UTC+4:00

Kirkhinsky (Russian: Кирхинский) is a rural locality (a khutor) in Serpo-Molotskoye Rural Settlement, Novonikolayevsky District, Volgograd Oblast, Russia. The population was 17 as of 2010. There are 3 streets.

== Geography ==
Kirkhinsky is located in steppe, on the Khopyorsko-Buzulukskaya Plain, 22 km southeast of Novonikolayevsky (the district's administrative centre) by road. Serp i Molot is the nearest rural locality.
