= Zugmara =

Zugmara Зугмара
- Selo
- Location within Zabaykalsky Krai Location within Russia
- Coordinates: 51°11′N 109°13′E
- Country: Russia
- Region: Zabaykalsky Krai
- District: Petrovsk-Zabaykalsky District
- Time zone: UTC+9:00

Zugmara (Russian: Зугмара) is a rural locality (a selo) in Petrovsk-Zabaykalsky District, Zabaykalsky Krai, Russia. Population: 222 (2021 census); 282 (2010 census); 267 (2002 census); There are 7 streets in this selo.

== Geography ==
This rural locality is located 28 km from Petrovsk-Zabaykalsky (the district's administrative centre), 313 km from Chita (capital of Zabaykalsky Krai) and 5,016 km from Moscow. Novopavlovka is the nearest rural locality.
