= Mironovsky =

Mironovsky Мироновский
- Khutor
- Location within Volgograd Oblast Location within Russia
- Coordinates: 51°10′N 42°52′E
- Country: Russia
- Region: Volgograd Oblast
- District: Novonikolayevsky District
- Time zone: UTC+4:00

Mironovsky (Russian: Мироновский) is a rural locality (a khutor) in Mirnoye Rural Settlement, Novonikolayevsky District, Volgograd Oblast, Russia. The population was 32 as of 2010. There are 3 streets.

== Geography ==
Mironovsky is located in steppe, on the Khopyorsko-Buzulukskaya Plain, on the bank of the Karavochka River, 53 km northeast of Novonikolayevsky (the district's administrative centre) by road. Mirny is the nearest rural locality.
