= Kuznetsovsky, Novonikolayevsky District, Volgograd Oblast =

Kuznetsovsky Кузнецовский
- Khutor
- Location within Volgograd Oblast Location within Russia
- Coordinates: 50°57′N 42°56′E
- Country: Russia
- Region: Volgograd Oblast
- District: Novonikolayevsky District
- Time zone: UTC+4:00

Kuznetsovsky (Russian: Кузнецовский) is a rural locality (a khutor) in Krasnoarmeyskoye Rural Settlement, Novonikolayevsky District, Volgograd Oblast, Russia. The population was 33 as of 2010. There are 3 streets.

== Geography ==
Kuznetsovsky is located in steppe, on the Khopyorsko-Buzulukskaya Plain, 61 km east of Novonikolayevsky (the district's administrative centre) by road. Belorechensky is the nearest rural locality.
