= Grachi, Novonikolayevsky District, Volgograd Oblast =

Grachi Грачи
- Khutor
- Location within Volgograd Oblast Location within Russia
- Coordinates: 50°53′N 42°16′E
- Country: Russia
- Region: Volgograd Oblast
- District: Novonikolayevsky District
- Time zone: UTC+4:00

Grachi (Russian: Грачи) is a rural locality (a khutor) in Aleksikovskoye Rural Settlement, Novonikolayevsky District, Volgograd Oblast, Russia. The population was 376 as of 2010. There are 18 streets.

== Geography ==
Grachi is located in steppe, on the Khopyorsko-Buzulukskaya Plain, 13 km southwest of Novonikolayevsky (the district's administrative centre) by road. Aleksikovsky is the nearest rural locality.
