= Kardailovka =

Kardailovka Кардаиловка
- Selo
- Location within Voronezh Oblast Location within Russia
- Coordinates: 51°14′N 42°40′E
- Country: Russia
- Region: Voronezh Oblast
- District: Povorinsky District
- Time zone: UTC+3:00

Kardailovka (Russian: Кардаиловка) is a rural locality (a selo) in Mazurskoye Rural Settlement, Povorinsky District, Voronezh Oblast, Russia. The population was 115 as of 2010. There are 5 streets.

== Geography ==
Kardailovka is located 39 km east of Povorino (the district's administrative centre) by road. Mazurka is the nearest rural locality.
