= Lashchenovsky =

Lashchenovsky Лащеновский
- Khutor
- Location within Volgograd Oblast Location within Russia
- Coordinates: 50°56′N 42°33′E
- Country: Russia
- Region: Volgograd Oblast
- District: Novonikolayevsky District
- Time zone: UTC+4:00

Lashchenovsky (Russian: Лащеновский) is a rural locality (a khutor) in Komsomolskoye Rural Settlement, Novonikolayevsky District, Volgograd Oblast, Russia. The population was 5 as of 2010.

== Geography ==
Lashchenovsky is located in steppe, on the Khopyorsko-Buzulukskaya Plain, 17 km southeast of Novonikolayevsky (the district's administrative centre) by road. Komsomolsky is the nearest rural locality.
