= Novonikolayevsky =

Novonikolayevsky (masculine), Novonikolayevskaya (feminine), or Novonikolayevskoye (neuter) may refer to:

- Novonikolayevsky District, a district of Volgograd Oblast, Russia
- Novonikolayevsky (inhabited locality) (Novonikolayevskaya, Novonikolayevskoye), name of several inhabited localities in Russia
