= Skvorsovsky =

Skvorsovsky Скворцовский
- Khutor
- Location within Volgograd Oblast Location within Russia
- Coordinates: 51°05′N 42°30′E
- Country: Russia
- Region: Volgograd Oblast
- District: Novonikolayevsky District
- Time zone: UTC+4:00

Skvorsovsky (Russian: Скворцовский) is a rural locality (a khutor) in Dvoynovskoye Rural Settlement, Novonikolayevsky District, Volgograd Oblast, Russia. The population was 62 as of 2010. There are 3 streets.

== Geography ==
Skvorsovsky is located in steppe, on the Khopyorsko-Buzulukskaya Plain, 19 km northeast of Novonikolayevsky (the district's administrative centre) by road. Dvoynovsky is the nearest rural locality.
