= Andrianovsky =

Andrianovsky Андриановский
- Khutor
- Location within Volgograd Oblast Location within Russia
- Coordinates: 51°07′N 43°03′E
- Country: Russia
- Region: Volgograd Oblast
- District: Novonikolayevsky District
- Time zone: UTC+4:00

Andrianovsky (Russian: Андриановский) is a rural locality (a khutor) in Krasnoarmeyskoye Rural Settlement, Novonikolayevsky District, Volgograd Oblast, Russia. The population was 64 as of 2010. There are 2 streets.

== Geography ==
Andrianovsky is located in steppe, on the Khopyorsko-Buzulukskaya Plain, on the left bank of the Kupava River, 67 km northeast of Novonikolayevsky (the district's administrative centre) by road. Novoberezovsky is the nearest rural locality.
