= Vikhlyayevka =

Vikhlyayevka Вихляевка
- Selo
- Location within Voronezh Oblast Location within Russia
- Coordinates: 51°15′N 42°51′E
- Country: Russia
- Region: Voronezh Oblast
- District: Povorinsky District
- Time zone: UTC+3:00

Vikhlyayevka (Russian: Вихляевка) is a rural locality (a selo) and the administrative center of Vikhlyayevskoye Rural Settlement, Povorinsky District, Voronezh Oblast, Russia. The population was 530 as of 2010. There are 3 streets.

== Geography ==
Vikhlyayevka is located 58 km east of Povorino (the district's administrative centre) by road. Sukhaya Yelan is the nearest rural locality.
