= Priovrazhny =

Priovrazhny Приовражный
- Khutor
- Location within Volgograd Oblast Location within Russia
- Coordinates: 51°01′N 42°41′E
- Country: Russia
- Region: Volgograd Oblast
- District: Novonikolayevsky District
- Time zone: UTC+4:00

Priovrazhny (Russian: Приовражный) is a rural locality (a khutor) in Khopyorskoye Rural Settlement, Novonikolayevsky District, Volgograd Oblast, Russia. The population was 28 as of 2010.

== Geography ==
Priovrazhny is located 33 km northeast of Novonikolayevsky (the district's administrative centre) by road. Novokardailsky is the nearest rural locality.
