= Baklanovsky, Volgograd Oblast =

Baklanovsky Баклановский
- Khutor
- Location within Volgograd Oblast Location within Russia
- Coordinates: 50°48′N 42°38′E
- Country: Russia
- Region: Volgograd Oblast
- District: Novonikolayevsky District
- Time zone: UTC+4:00

Baklanovsky (Russian: Баклановский) is a rural locality (a khutor) in Kulikovskoye Rural Settlement, Novonikolayevsky District, Volgograd Oblast, Russia. The population was 27 as of 2010. There are 6 streets.

== Geography ==
Baklanovsky is located in steppe, on the Khopyorsko-Buzulukskaya Plain, near the Biryuchy Pond, 29 km southeast of Novonikolayevsky (the district's administrative centre) by road. Kulikovsky is the nearest rural locality.
