= Kikvidze =

Kikvidze Киквидзе
- Khutor
- Location within Volgograd Oblast Location within Russia
- Coordinates: 50°53′N 42°46′E
- Country: Russia
- Region: Volgograd Oblast
- District: Novonikolayevsky District
- Time zone: UTC+4:00

Kikvidze (Russian: Киквидзе) is a rural locality (a khutor) in Khopyorskoye Rural Settlement, Novonikolayevsky District, Volgograd Oblast, Russia. The population was 265 as of 2010. There are 11 streets.

== Geography ==
Kikvidze is located on the Khopyorsko-Buzulukskaya Plain, on the left bank of the Kardail River, 38 km southeast of Novonikolayevsky (the district's administrative centre) by road. Nizhnekardailsky is the nearest rural locality.
