= Katayevo, Zabaykalsky Krai =

Katayevo Катаево
- Selo
- Location within Zabaykalsky Krai Location within Russia
- Coordinates: 50°56′N 108°39′E
- Country: Russia
- Region: Zabaykalsky Krai
- District: Petrovsk-Zabaykalsky District
- Time zone: UTC+9:00

Katayevo (Russian: Катаево) is a rural locality (a selo) in Petrovsk-Zabaykalsky District, Zabaykalsky Krai, Russia. Population: 553 (2021 census); 657 (2010 census); 711 (2002 census); There are 10 streets in this selo.

== Geography ==
This rural locality is located 39 km from Petrovsk-Zabaykalsky (the district's administrative centre), 360 km from Chita (capital of Zabaykalsky Krai) and 5,006 km from Moscow. Kandobayevo is the nearest rural locality.
