= Novonikolskoye, Zabaykalsky Krai =

Novonikolskoye Новоникольское
- Selo
- Location within Zabaykalsky Krai Location within Russia
- Coordinates: 50°50′N 108°18′E
- Country: Russia
- Region: Zabaykalsky Krai
- District: Petrovsk-Zabaykalsky District
- Time zone: UTC+9:00

Novonikolskoye (Russian: Новоникольское) is a rural locality (a selo) in Petrovsk-Zabaykalsky District, Zabaykalsky Krai, Russia. Population: 7 (2021 census); 10 (2010 census); 13 (2002 census); There are 2 streets in this selo.

== Geography ==
This rural locality is located 61 km from Petrovsk-Zabaykalsky (the district's administrative centre), 388 km from Chita (capital of Zabaykalsky Krai) and 4,994 km from Moscow. Krasnaya Dolina is the nearest rural locality.
