= Nizhnezubrilovsky =

Nizhnezubrilovsky Нижнезубриловский
- Khutor
- Location within Volgograd Oblast Location within Russia
- Coordinates: 51°12′N 42°42′E
- Country: Russia
- Region: Volgograd Oblast
- District: Novonikolayevsky District
- Time zone: UTC+4:00

Nizhnezubrilovsky (Russian: Нижнезубриловский) is a rural locality (a khutor) in Mirnoye Rural Settlement, Novonikolayevsky District, Volgograd Oblast, Russia. The population was 130 as of 2010. There are 2 streets.

== Geography ==
Nizhnezubrilovsky is located in steppe, on the Khopyorsko-Buzulukskaya Plain, on the left bank of the Kardail River, 61 km northeast of Novonikolayevsky (the district's administrative centre) by road. Verkhnezubrilovsky is the nearest rural locality.
