= Verkhnekardailsky =

Verkhnekardailsky Верхнекардаильский
- Khutor
- Location within Volgograd Oblast Location within Russia
- Coordinates: 51°05′N 42°40′E
- Country: Russia
- Region: Volgograd Oblast
- District: Novonikolayevsky District
- Time zone: UTC+4:00

Verkhnekardailsky (Russian: Верхнекардаильский) is a rural locality (a khutor) and the administrative center of Verkhnekardailskoye Rural Settlement, Novonikolayevsky District, Volgograd Oblast, Russia. The population was 869 as of 2010. There are 17 streets.

== Geography ==
Verkhnekardailsky is located in steppe, on the Khopyorsko-Buzulukskaya Plain, on the right bank of the Kardail River, 28 km northeast of Novonikolayevsky (the district's administrative centre) by road. Nikolayevsky is the nearest rural locality.
