= Tolbaga, Zabaykalsky Krai =

Tolbaga Толбага
- Selo
- Location within Zabaykalsky Krai Location within Russia
- Coordinates: 51°12′N 109°19′E
- Country: Russia
- Region: Zabaykalsky Krai
- District: Petrovsk-Zabaykalsky District
- Time zone: UTC+9:00

Tolbaga (Russian: Толбага) is a rural locality (a selo) in Petrovsk-Zabaykalsky District, Zabaykalsky Krai, Russia. Population: 447 (2021 census); 507 (2010 census); 638 (2002 census); There are 4 streets in this selo.

== Geography ==
This rural locality is located 34 km from Petrovsk-Zabaykalsky (the district's administrative centre), 305 km from Chita (capital of Zabaykalsky Krai) and 5,021 km from Moscow. Novopavlovka is the nearest rural locality.
