= Dvoynovsky =

Dvoynovsky Двойновский
- Khutor
- Location within Volgograd Oblast Location within Russia
- Coordinates: 51°02′N 42°27′E
- Country: Russia
- Region: Volgograd Oblast
- District: Novonikolayevsky District
- Time zone: UTC+4:00

Dvoynovsky (Russian: Двойновский) is a rural locality (a khutor) and the administrative center of Dvoynovskoye Rural Settlement, Novonikolayevsky District, Volgograd Oblast, Russia. The population was 813 as of 2010. There are 16 streets.

== Geography ==
Dvoynovsky is located in steppe, on the Khopyorsko-Buzulukskaya Plain, 13 km northeast of Novonikolayevsky (the district's administrative centre) by road. Orlovsky is the nearest rural locality.
