= Fabrichny =

Fabrichny (masculine), Fabrichnaya (feminine), or Fabrichnoye (neuter) may refer to:

- Fabrichny City District, a district of the city of Kostroma, Russia
- Fabrichny (rural locality), a rural locality (a settlement) in Sapozhkovsky District of Ryazan Oblast
- Fabrichnaya, a rural locality (a sloboda) in Sapozhkovsky District of Ryazan Oblast
