= Sapozhok, Volgograd Oblast =

Sapozhok Сапожок
- Khutor
- Location within Volgograd Oblast Location within Russia
- Coordinates: 51°13′N 42°47′E
- Country: Russia
- Region: Volgograd Oblast
- District: Novonikolayevsky District
- Time zone: UTC+4:00

Sapozhok (Russian: Сапожок) is a rural locality (a khutor) in Mirnoye Rural Settlement, Novonikolayevsky District, Volgograd Oblast, Russia. The population was 66 as of 2010. There are 2 streets.

== Geography ==
Sapozhok is located in steppe, on the Khopyorsko-Buzulukskaya Plain, 54 km northeast of Novonikolayevsky (the district's administrative centre) by road. Mirny is the nearest rural locality.
