= Fominsky, Volgograd Oblast =

Fominsky Фоминский
- Khutor
- Location within Volgograd Oblast Location within Russia
- Coordinates: 51°02′N 42°17′E
- Country: Russia
- Region: Volgograd Oblast
- District: Novonikolayevsky District
- Time zone: UTC+4:00

Fominsky (Russian: Фоминский) is a rural locality (a khutor) in Novonikolayevskoye Rural Settlement, Novonikolayevsky District, Volgograd Oblast, Russia. The population was 152 as of 2010. There are 3 streets.

== Geography ==
Fominsky is located in steppe, on the Khopyorsko-Buzulukskaya Plain, 10 km northwest of Novonikolayevsky (the district's administrative centre) by road. Korolevsky is the nearest rural locality.
