= Duplyatsky =

Duplyatsky Дуплятский
- Khutor
- Location within Volgograd Oblast Location within Russia
- Coordinates: 51°06′N 42°21′E
- Country: Russia
- Region: Volgograd Oblast
- District: Novonikolayevsky District
- Time zone: UTC+4:00

Duplyatsky (Russian: Дуплятский) is a rural locality (a khutor) and the administrative center of Duplaytskoye Rural Settlement, Novonikolayevsky District, Volgograd Oblast, Russia. The population was 922 as of 2010. There are 14 streets.

== Geography ==
Duplyatsky is located in steppe, on the Khopyorsko-Buzulukskaya Plain, on the Kasarka River, 16 km north of Novonikolayevsky (the district's administrative centre) by road. Orlovsky is the nearest rural locality.
