= Samodurovka, Voronezh Oblast =

Samodurovka Самодуровка
- Selo
- Location within Voronezh Oblast Location within Russia
- Coordinates: 51°11′N 42°21′E
- Country: Russia
- Region: Voronezh Oblast
- District: Povorinsky District
- Time zone: UTC+3:00

Samodurovka (Russian: Самодуровка) is a rural locality (a selo) and the administrative center of Samodurvskoye Rural Settlement, Povorinsky District, Voronezh Oblast, Russia. The population was 666 as of 2010. There are 5 streets.

== Geography ==
Samodurovka is located 12 km east of Povorino (the district's administrative centre) by road. Mokhovoye is the nearest rural locality.
