= Sapozhkovsky =

Sapozhkovsky (masculine), Sapozhkovskaya (feminine), or Sapozhkovskoye (neuter) may refer to:

- Sapozhkovsky District, a district of Ryazan Oblast, Russia
- Sapozhkovsky (rural locality), a rural locality (a settlement) in Novosibirsk Oblast, Russia
