= Baychurovo =

Baychurovo Байчурово
- Selo
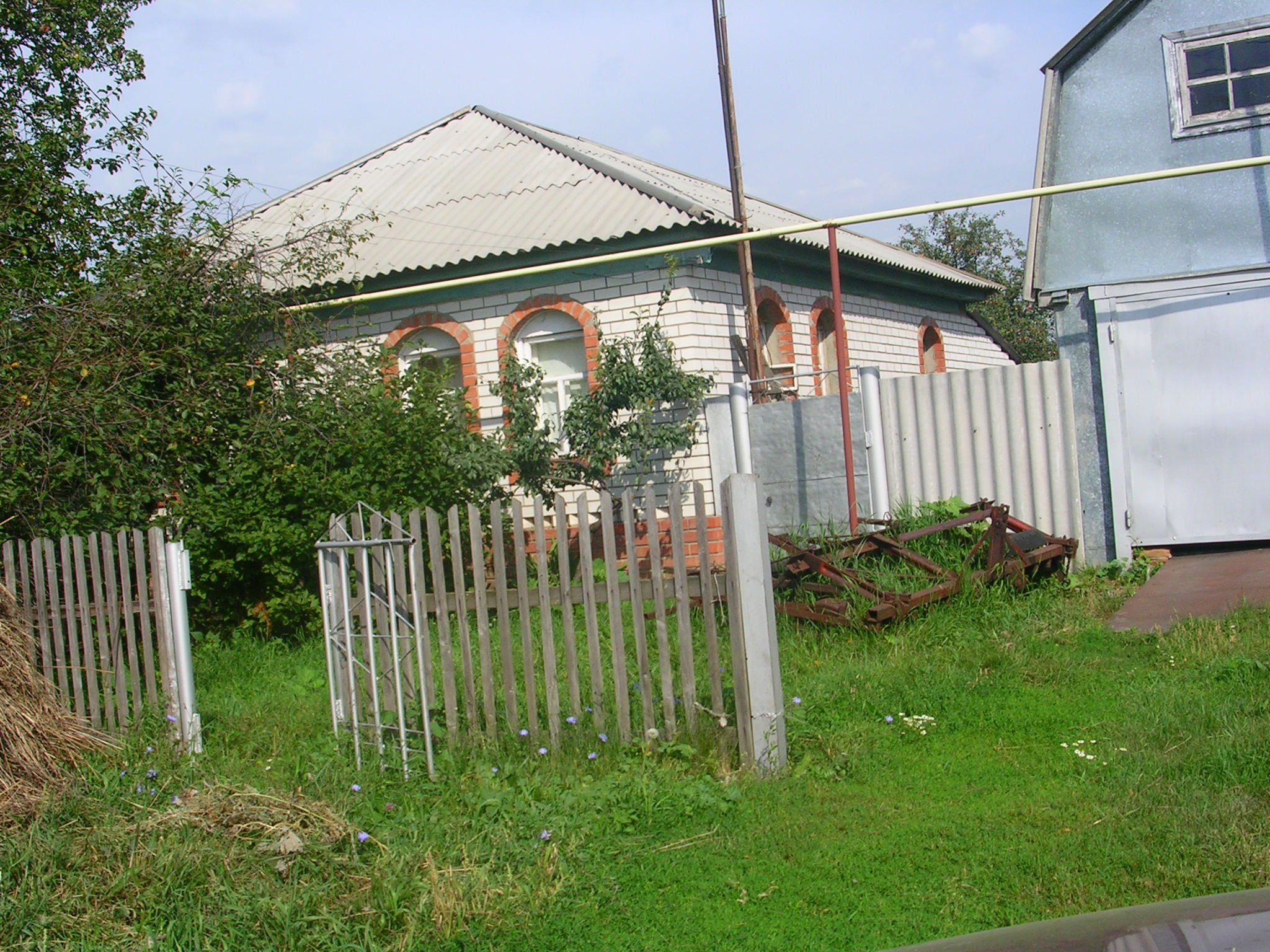
- A locality in Baychurovo, Russia

- Location within Voronezh Oblast Location within Russia
- Coordinates: 51°20′N 42°41′E
- Country: Russia
- Region: Voronezh Oblast
- District: Povorinsky District
- Time zone: UTC+3:00

Baychurovo (Russian: Байчурово) is a rural locality (a selo) and the administrative center of Baychurovskoye Rural Settlement, Povorinsky District, Voronezh Oblast, Russia. The population was 1,577 as of 2010. There are 19 streets.

== Geography ==
Baychurovo is located 42 km northeast of Povorino (the district's administrative centre) by road. Kamenka is the nearest rural locality.
