= Peski, Zabaykalsky Krai =

Peski Пески
- Selo
- Location within Zabaykalsky Krai Location within Russia
- Coordinates: 50°46′N 108°07′E
- Country: Russia
- Region: Zabaykalsky Krai
- District: Petrovsk-Zabaykalsky District
- Time zone: UTC+9:00

Peski (Russian: Пески) is a rural locality (a selo) in Petrovsk-Zabaykalsky District, Zabaykalsky Krai, Russia. Population: 433 (2021 census); 548 (2010 census); 510 (2002 census); There are 5 streets in this selo.

== Geography ==
This rural locality is located 76 km from Petrovsk-Zabaykalsky (the district's administrative centre), 404 km from Chita (capital of Zabaykalsky Krai) and 4,989 km from Moscow. Novaya Zardama is the nearest rural locality.
