= Pisky =

Pisky (Ukrainian: Піски, lit. 'sands') may refer to several places in Ukraine:

- Pisky, Chernihiv Oblast, village in Nizhyn Raion
- Pisky, Pokrovsk Raion, Donetsk Oblast, a village near Donetsk International Airport
- Pisky, Lviv Raion, Lviv Oblast
- Pisky, Mykolaiv Oblast, a village in Bashtanka Raion
- Pisky, Myrhorod Raion, Poltava Oblast
- Pisky, Zolochiv Raion, Lviv Oblast

== See also ==
- Peski, several inhabited localities in Russia
- Pixie, a creature of British folklore, known as a pisky in Cornwall
