= Peski, Povorinsky District, Voronezh Oblast =

Peski Пески
- Selo
- Location within Voronezh Oblast Location within Russia
- Coordinates: 51°15′N 42°27′E
- Country: Russia
- Region: Voronezh Oblast
- District: Povorinsky District
- Time zone: UTC+3:00

Peski (Russian: Пески) is a rural locality (a selo) and the administrative center of Peskovskoye Rural Settlement, Povorinsky District, Voronezh Oblast, Russia. The population was 6,625 (2021 census); 6,953 as of 2010. There are 49 streets.

== Geography ==
Peski is located 23 km northeast of Povorino (the district's administrative centre) by road. Mazurka is the nearest rural locality.
