= Peski, Petropavlovsky District, Voronezh Oblast =

Peski Пески
- Selo
- Location within Voronezh Oblast Location within Russia
- Coordinates: 50°15′N 40°52′E
- Country: Russia
- Region: Voronezh Oblast
- District: Petropavlovsky District
- Time zone: UTC+3:00

Peski (Russian: Пески) is a rural locality (a selo) and the administrative center of Peskovskoye Rural Settlement, Petropavlovsky District, Voronezh Oblast, Russia. The population was 1,402 as of 2010. There are 12 streets.

== Geography ==
Peski is located 20 km north of Petropavlovka (the district's administrative centre) by road. Staraya Melovaya is the nearest rural locality.
