= Fominsky, Konoshsky District, Arkhangelsk Oblast =

Fominsky Фоминский
- Settlement
- Location within Arkhangelsk Oblast Location within Russia
- Coordinates: 61°11′N 40°16′E
- Country: Russia
- Region: Arkhangelsk Oblast
- District: Konoshsky District
- Time zone: UTC+3:00

Fominsky (Russian: Фоминский) is a rural locality (a settlement) in Konoshsky District, Arkhangelsk Oblast, Russia. The population was 62 as of 2012. There are 3 streets.

== Geography ==
Fominsky is located 40 km north of Konosha (the district's administrative centre) by road. Ostashevskaya is the nearest rural locality.
