= Fominskoye, Kharovsky District, Vologda Oblast =

Fominskoye Фоминское
- Village
- Location within Vologda Oblast Location within Russia
- Coordinates: 59°58′N 40°11′E
- Country: Russia
- Region: Vologda Oblast
- District: Kharovsky District
- Time zone: UTC+3:00

Fominskoye (Russian: Фоминское) is a rural locality (a village) in Kharovskoye Rural Settlement, Kharovsky District, Vologda Oblast, Russia. The population was 27 as of 2002.

== Geography ==
Fominskoye is located 16 km northwest of Kharovsk (the district's administrative centre) by road. Khomutovo is the nearest rural locality.
