= Fominskaya, Kolengsky Selsoviet, Verkhovazhsky District, Vologda Oblast =

Fominskaya Фоминская
- Village
- Location within Vologda Oblast Location within Russia
- Coordinates: 60°47′N 42°42′E
- Country: Russia
- Region: Vologda Oblast
- District: Verkhovazhsky District
- Time zone: UTC+3:00

Fominskaya (Russian: Фоминская) is a rural locality (a village) in Kolengskoye Rural Settlement, Verkhovazhsky District, Vologda Oblast, Russia. The population was 42 as of 2002.

== Geography ==
The distance to Verkhovazhye is 53 km, to Noginskaya is 1 km. Udaltsovskaya, Nivskaya, Noginskaya are the nearest rural localities.
