= Peski, Volgograd Oblast =

Peski Пески
- Settlement
- Location within Volgograd Oblast Location within Russia
- Coordinates: 50°02′N 45°57′E
- Country: Russia
- Region: Volgograd Oblast
- District: Nikolayevsky District
- Time zone: UTC+4:00

Peski (Russian: Пески) is a rural locality (a settlement) in Sovkhozskoye Rural Settlement, Nikolayevsky District, Volgograd Oblast, Russia. The population was 14 as of 2010.

== Geography ==
Peski is located 45 km east of Nikolayevsk (the district's administrative centre) by road. Krasny Meliorator is the nearest rural locality.
