= Fominskoye, Zavolzhsky District, Ivanovo Oblast =

Fominskoye Фоминское
- Village
- Location within Ivanovo Oblast Location within Russia
- Coordinates: 57°26′N 41°39′E
- Country: Russia
- Region: Ivanovo Oblast
- District: Zavolzhsky District
- Time zone: UTC+3:00

Fominskoye (Russian: Фоминское) is a rural locality (a village) in Zavolzhsky District, Ivanovo Oblast, Russia. Population: 77 (2010 census);

== Geography ==
This rural locality is located 29 km from Zavolzhsk (the district's administrative centre), 65 km from Ivanovo (capital of Ivanovo Oblast) and 306 km from Moscow. Borshchevka is the nearest rural locality.
