= Novonikolayevsky, Republic of Bashkortostan =

Novonikolayevsky Новониколаевский
- Village
- Location within Bashkortostan Location within Russia
- Coordinates: 53°29′N 55°51′E
- Country: Russia
- Region: Bashkortostan
- District: Sterlitamaksky District
- Time zone: UTC+5:00

Novonikolayevsky (Russian: Новониколаевский) is a rural locality (a village) in Naumovsky Selsoviet, Sterlitamaksky District, Bashkortostan, Russia. The population was 60 as of 2010. There is 1 street.

== Geography ==
Novonikolayevsky is located 22 km southwest of Sterlitamak (the district's administrative centre) by road. Novaya Vasilyevka is the nearest rural locality.
