= Peski, Vyaznikovsky District, Vladimir Oblast =

Peski Пески
- Village
- Location within Vladimir Oblast Location within Russia
- Coordinates: 56°11′N 42°15′E
- Country: Russia
- Region: Vladimir Oblast
- District: Vyaznikovsky District
- Time zone: UTC+3:00

Peski (Russian: Пески) is a rural locality (a village) in Gorod Vyazniki, Vyaznikovsky District, Vladimir Oblast, Russia. The population was 487 as of 2010. There are 6 streets.

== Geography ==
Peski is located 16 km southeast of Vyazniki (the district's administrative centre) by road. Danilkovo is the nearest rural locality.
