= Peski, Vologodsky District, Vologda Oblast =

Peski Пески
- Village
- Location within Vologda Oblast Location within Russia
- Coordinates: 59°48′N 39°05′E
- Country: Russia
- Region: Vologda Oblast
- District: Vologodsky District
- Time zone: UTC+3:00

Peski (Russian: Пески) is a rural locality (a village) in Novlenskoye Rural Settlement, Vologodsky District, Vologda Oblast, Russia. The population was 85 as of 2002.

== Geography ==
Peski is located 87 km northwest of Vologda (the district's administrative centre) by road. Podol is the nearest rural locality.
