= Fominskaya, Konoshsky District, Arkhangelsk Oblast =

Fominskaya Фоминская
- Village
- Location within Arkhangelsk Oblast Location within Russia
- Coordinates: 61°10′N 40°17′E
- Country: Russia
- Region: Arkhangelsk Oblast
- District: Konoshsky District
- Time zone: UTC+3:00

Fominskaya (Russian: Фоминская) is a rural locality (a village) in Konoshsky District, Arkhangelsk Oblast, Russia. The population was 25 as of 2010. There is 1 street.

== Geography ==
Fominskaya is located on the Vokhtomitsa River, 42 km north of Konosha (the district's administrative centre) by road. Kuznetsovskaya is the nearest rural locality.
