= Peski, Nyuksensky District, Vologda Oblast =

Peski Пески
- Village
- Location within Vologda Oblast Location within Russia
- Coordinates: 60°10′N 43°45′E
- Country: Russia
- Region: Vologda Oblast
- District: Nyuksensky District
- Time zone: UTC+3:00

Peski (Russian: Пески) is a rural locality (a village) in Igmasskoye Rural Settlement, Nyuksensky District, Vologda Oblast, Russia. The population was 101 as of 2002.

== Geography ==
Peski is located 45 km southwest of Nyuksenitsa (the district's administrative centre) by road. Kirillovo is the nearest rural locality.
