= Fominskoye, Altai Krai =

Fominskoye Фоминское
- Selo
- Location within Altai Krai Location within Russia
- Coordinates: 52°27′N 84°54′E
- Country: Russia
- Region: Altai Krai
- District: Biysk
- Time zone: UTC+7:00

Fominskoye (Russian: Фоминское) is a rural locality (a selo) in Biysk, Altai Krai, Russia. The population was 1,273 as of 2013. There are 56 streets.

== Geography ==
Fominskoye is located 31 km southwest of Biysk (the district's administrative centre) by road. Odintsovka is the nearest rural locality.
