= Fominskaya, Morozovsky Selsoviet, Verkhovazhsky District, Vologda Oblast =

Fominskaya Фоминская
- Village
- Location within Vologda Oblast Location within Russia
- Coordinates: 60°47′N 41°41′E
- Country: Russia
- Region: Vologda Oblast
- District: Verkhovazhsky District
- Time zone: UTC+3:00

Fominskaya (Russian: Фоминская) is a rural locality (a village) in Morozovskoye Rural Settlement, Verkhovazhsky District, Vologda Oblast, Russia. The population was 69 as of 2002.

== Geography ==
The distance to Verkhovazhye is 25.3 km, to Morozovo is 1 km. Borovaya Pustosh, Olotinskaya, Mikhaylovskaya, Sboyevskaya, Silinskaya-1, Zakharovskaya, Morozovo, Mashkovskaya, Mininskaya are the nearest rural localities.
