= Fominskaya, Velikoustyugsky District, Vologda Oblast =

Fominskaya Фоминская
- Village
- Location within Vologda Oblast Location within Russia
- Coordinates: 60°30′N 46°15′E
- Country: Russia
- Region: Vologda Oblast
- District: Velikoustyugsky District
- Time zone: UTC+3:00

Fominskaya (Russian: Фоминская) is a rural locality (a village) in Nizhneshardengskoye Rural Settlement, Velikoustyugsky District, Vologda Oblast, Russia. The population was 7 as of 2002.

== Geography ==
Fominskaya is located 36 km south of Veliky Ustyug (the district's administrative centre) by road. Birichevo is the nearest rural locality.
