= Fominskoye, Cherepovetsky District, Vologda Oblast =

Fominskoye Фоминское
- Village
- Location within Vologda Oblast Location within Russia
- Coordinates: 58°57′N 38°39′E
- Country: Russia
- Region: Vologda Oblast
- District: Cherepovetsky District
- Time zone: UTC+3:00

Fominskoye (Russian: Фоминское) is a rural locality (a village) in Yugskoye Rural Settlement, Cherepovetsky District, Vologda Oblast, Russia. The population was 92 as of 2002. There are five streets.

== Geography ==
Fominskoye is located 59 km (37 mi) southeast of Cherepovets (the district's administrative centre) by road. Dyakonovo is the nearest rural locality.
