= Fominskaya, Vozhegodsky District, Vologda Oblast =

Fominskaya Фоминская
- Village
- Location within Vologda Oblast Location within Russia
- Coordinates: 60°32′N 40°16′E
- Country: Russia
- Region: Vologda Oblast
- District: Vozhegodsky District
- Time zone: UTC+3:00

Fominskaya (Russian: Фоминская) is a rural locality (a village) in Yavengskoye Rural Settlement, Vozhegodsky District, Vologda Oblast, Russia. The population was 2 as of 2002.

== Geography ==
Fominskaya is located 13 km northeast of Vozhega (the district's administrative centre) by road. Bykovskaya is the nearest rural locality.
