= Novonikolayevskoye, Vladimir Oblast =

Novonikolayevskoye Новониколаевское
- Village
- Location within Vladimir Oblast Location within Russia
- Coordinates: 55°33′N 41°24′E
- Country: Russia
- Region: Vladimir Oblast
- District: Melenkovsky District
- Time zone: UTC+3:00

Novonikolayevskoye (Russian: Новониколаевское) is a rural locality (a village) in Butylitskoye Rural Settlement, Melenkovsky District, Vladimir Oblast, Russia. The population was 109 as of 2010.

== Geography ==
Novonikolayevskoye is located 33 km northwest of Melenki (the district's administrative centre) by road. Sovetsky is the nearest rural locality.
