= Fominsky, Vologda Oblast =

Fominsky Фоминский
- Village
- Location within Vologda Oblast Location within Russia
- Coordinates: 59°49′N 45°20′E
- Country: Russia
- Region: Vologda Oblast
- District: Kichmengsko-Gorodetsky District
- Time zone: UTC+3:00

Fominsky (Russian: Фоминский) is a rural locality (a village) in Kichmegnskoye Rural Settlement, Kichmengsko-Gorodetsky District, Vologda Oblast, Russia. The population was 25 as of 2002.

== Geography ==
The distance to Kichmengsky Gorodok is 42 km. Gorka is the nearest rural locality.
