= Novonikolayevskoye, Republic of Bashkortostan =

Novonikolayevskoye Новониколаевское
- Selo
- Location within Bashkortostan Location within Russia
- Coordinates: 52°40′N 56°32′E
- Country: Russia
- Region: Bashkortostan
- District: Kugarchinsky District
- Time zone: UTC+5:00

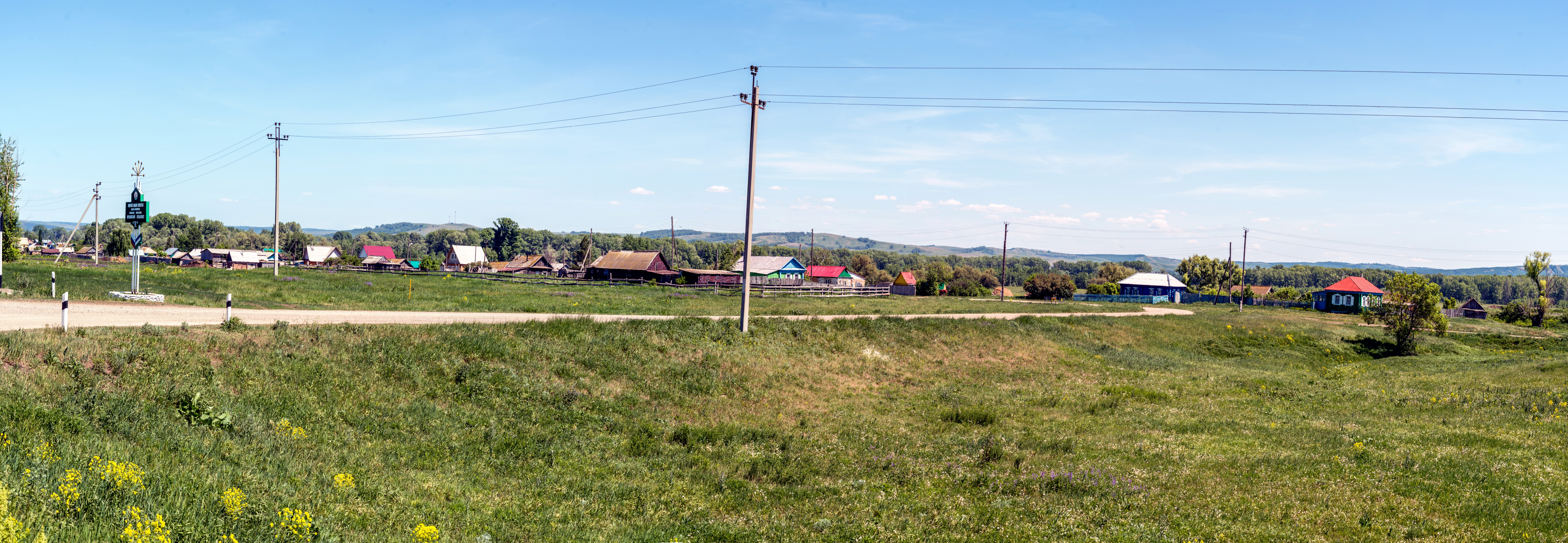

Novonikolayevskoye (Russian: Новониколаевское) is a rural locality (a village) in Mrakovsky Selsoviet, Kugarchinsky District, Bashkortostan, Russia. The population was 328 as of 2010. There are 3 streets.

== Geography ==
Novonikolayevskoye is located 8 km southwest of Mrakovo (the district's administrative centre) by road. Kanakachevo is the nearest rural locality.
