= Sapozhok, Ryazan Oblast =

Sapozhok Сапожок
- Urban-type settlement
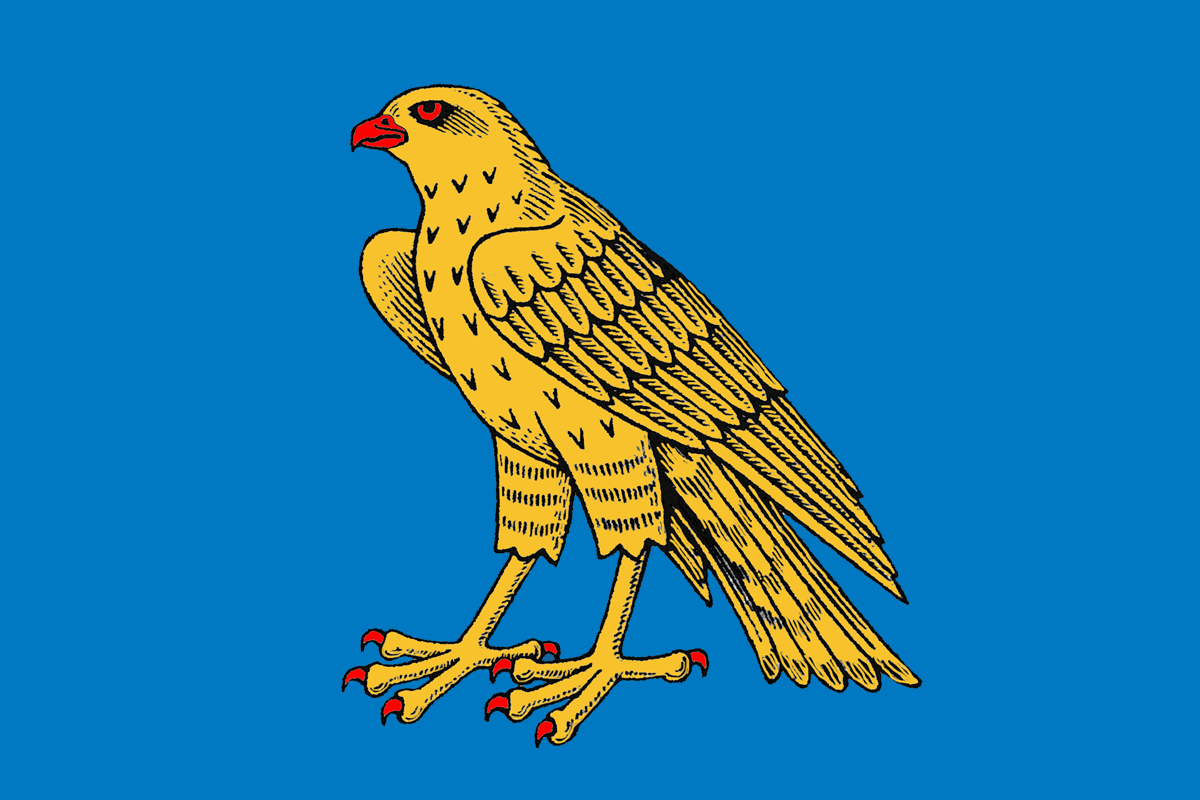
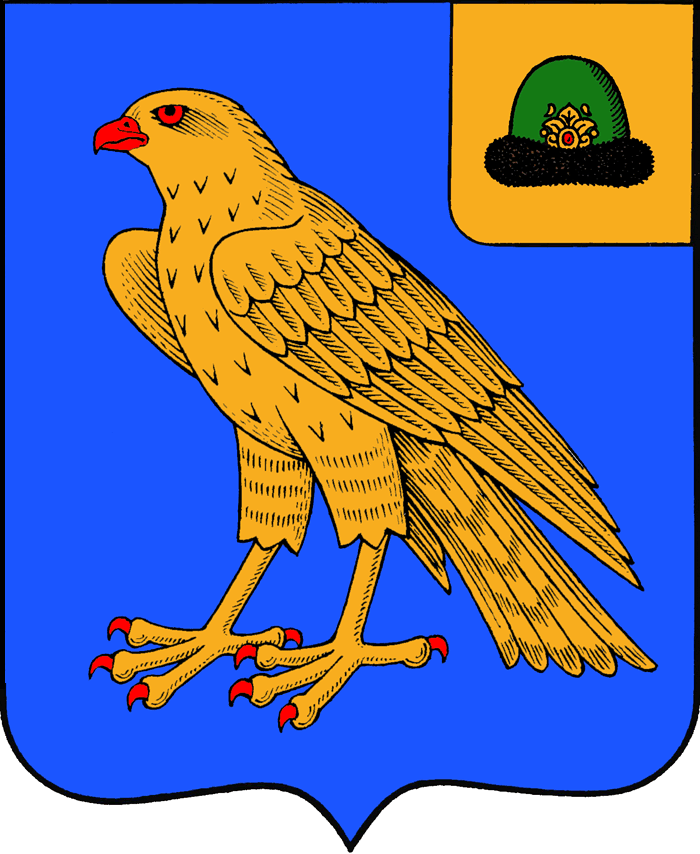
- Flag Coat of arms
- Interactive map of Sapozhok
- Location of Sapozhok Sapozhok (Ryazan Oblast)
- Coordinates: 53.9435°N 40.6833°E
- Country: Russia
- Federal subject: Ryazan Oblast
- Administrative district: Sapozhkovsky District
- Founded: 1605

Population (2010 Census)
  - Total: 3,878
  - Estimate (2023): 2,984 (−23.1%)
- Time zone: UTC+3 (MSK)
- Postal code: 391940
- OKTMO ID: 61637151051

Sapozhok (Russian: Сапожо́к) is an urban locality (an urban-type settlement) in Sapozhkovsky District of Ryazan Oblast, Russia. Population: 3,878 (2010 census); 4,392 (2002 census); 5,313 (1989 Soviet census).
