= Sapozhkovsky District =

Sapozhkovsky District Сапожковский район (Russian)
- District
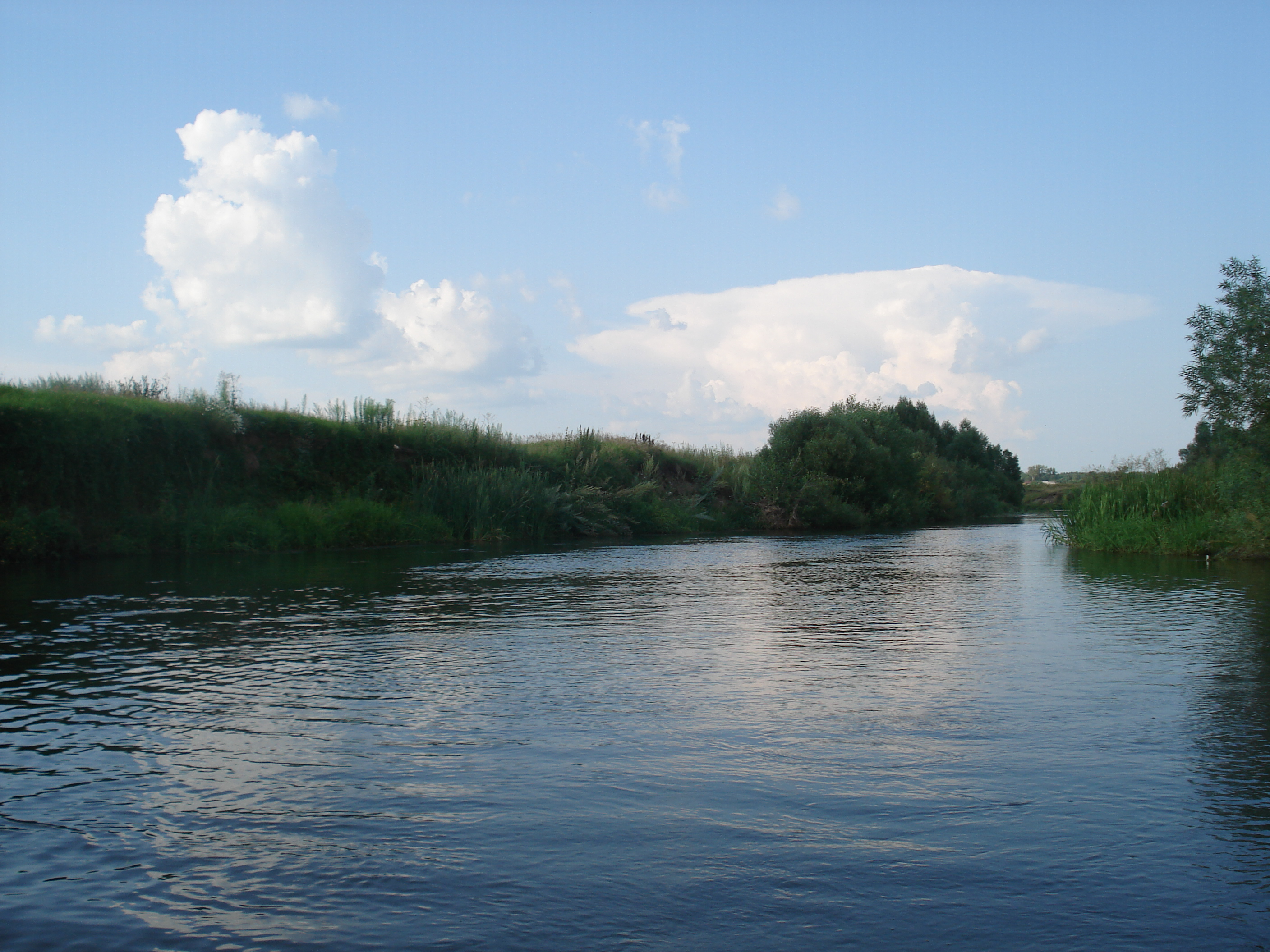
- Para River, Sapozhkovsky District

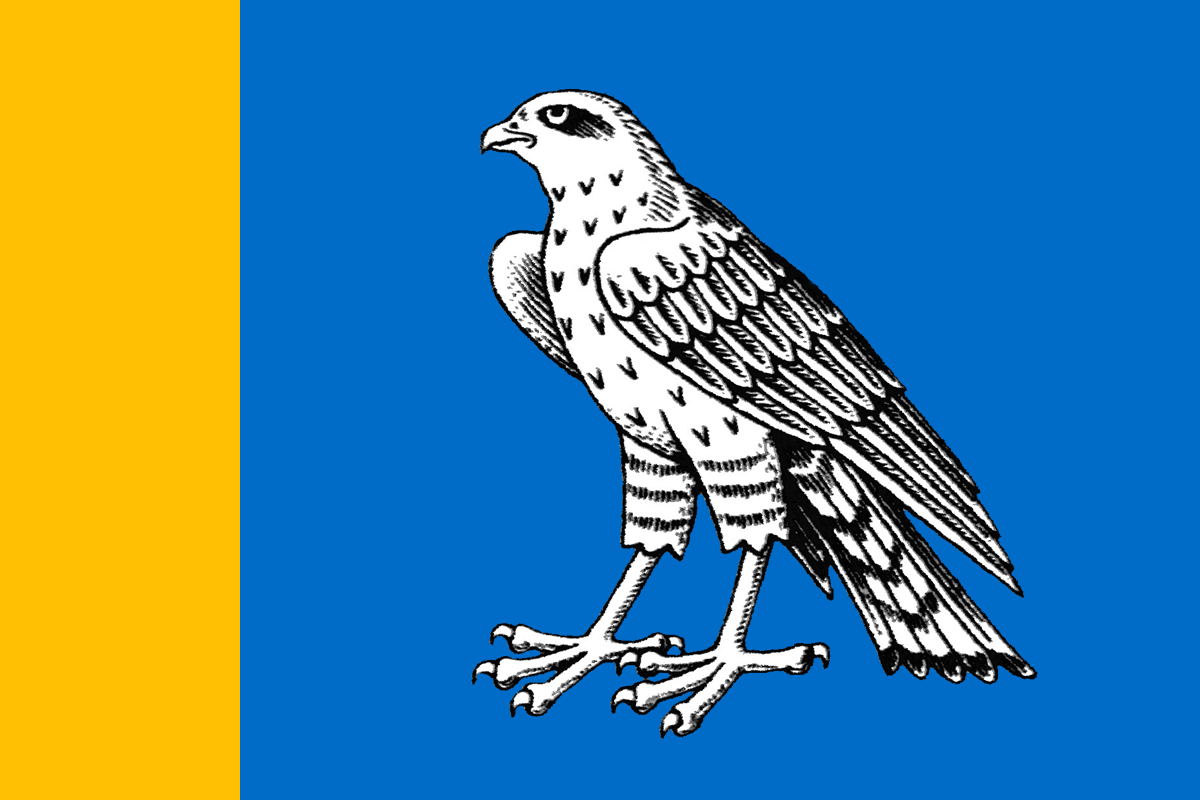
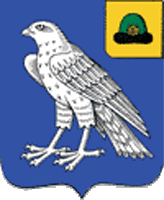
- Flag Coat of arms
- Location of Sapozhkovsky District in Ryazan Oblast
- Coordinates: 53°56′37″N 40°40′57″E
- Country: Russia
- Federal subject: Ryazan Oblast
- Established: 12 July 1929
- Administrative center: Sapozhok

Area
  - Total: 960 km^{2} (370 sq mi)

Population (2010 Census)
  - Total: 10,901
  - Density: 11/km^{2} (29/sq mi)
  - Urban: 35.6%
  - Rural: 64.4%

Administrative structure
  - Administrative divisions: 1 Work settlements, 9 Rural okrugs
  - Inhabited localities: 1 urban-type settlements, 53 rural localities

Municipal structure
  - Municipally incorporated as: Sapozhkovsky Municipal District
  - Municipal divisions: 1 urban settlements, 4 rural settlements
- Time zone: UTC+3 (MSK)
- OKTMO ID: 61637000
- Website: https://sapozhok.ryazangov.ru/

Sapozhkovsky District (Russian: Сапожко́вский райо́н) is an administrative and municipal district (raion), one of the twenty-five in Ryazan Oblast, Russia. It is located in the southern central part of the oblast. The area of the district is 960 square kilometers (370 sq mi). Its administrative center is the urban locality (a work settlement) of Sapozhok. Population: 10,901 (2010 Census); 12,542 (2002 census); 16,065 (1989 Soviet census). The population of Sapozhok accounts for 35.6% of the district's total population.
