= Povorino =

Town in Voronezh Oblast, Russia

Povorino Поворино
- Town
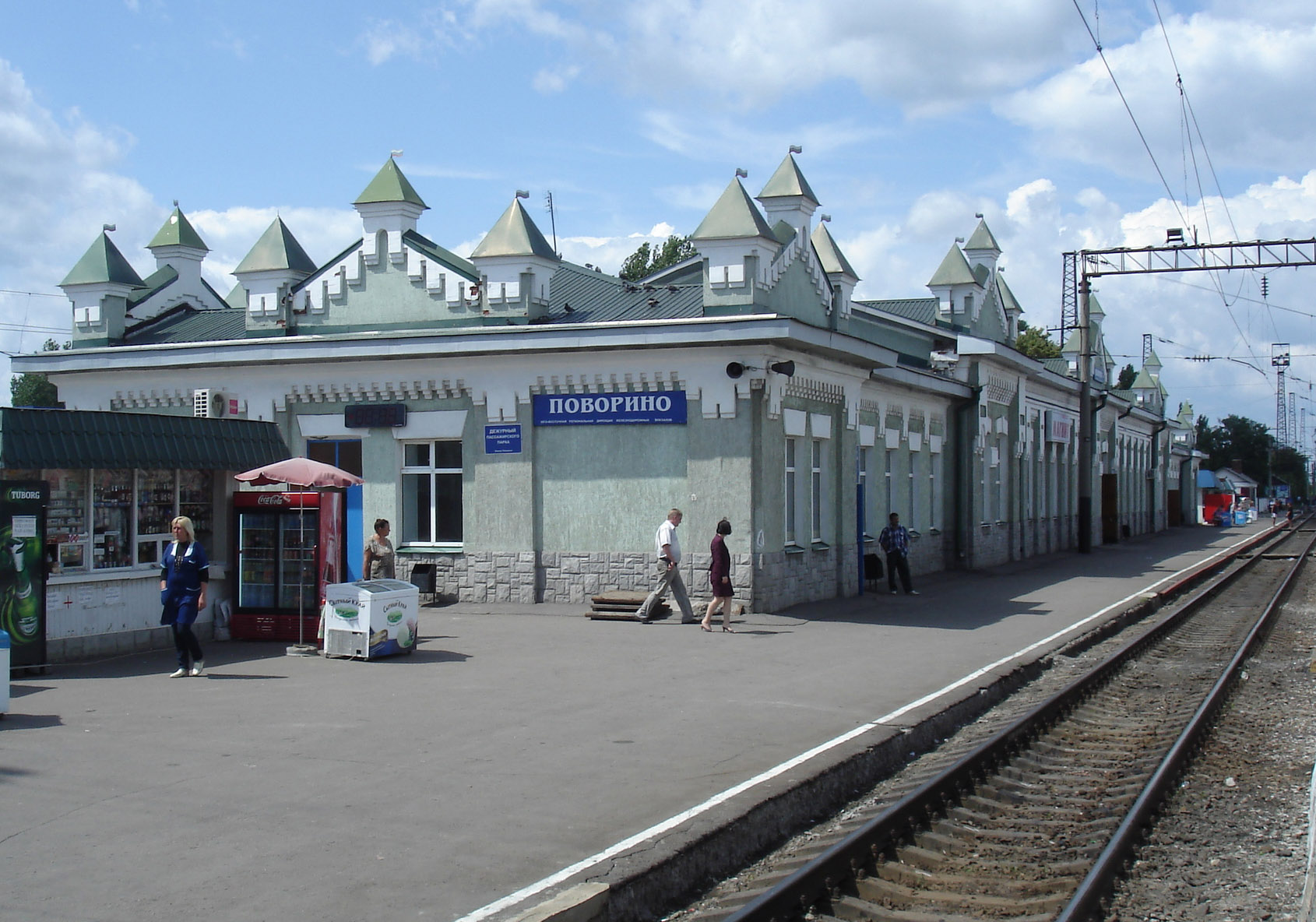
- Povorino Railway Station

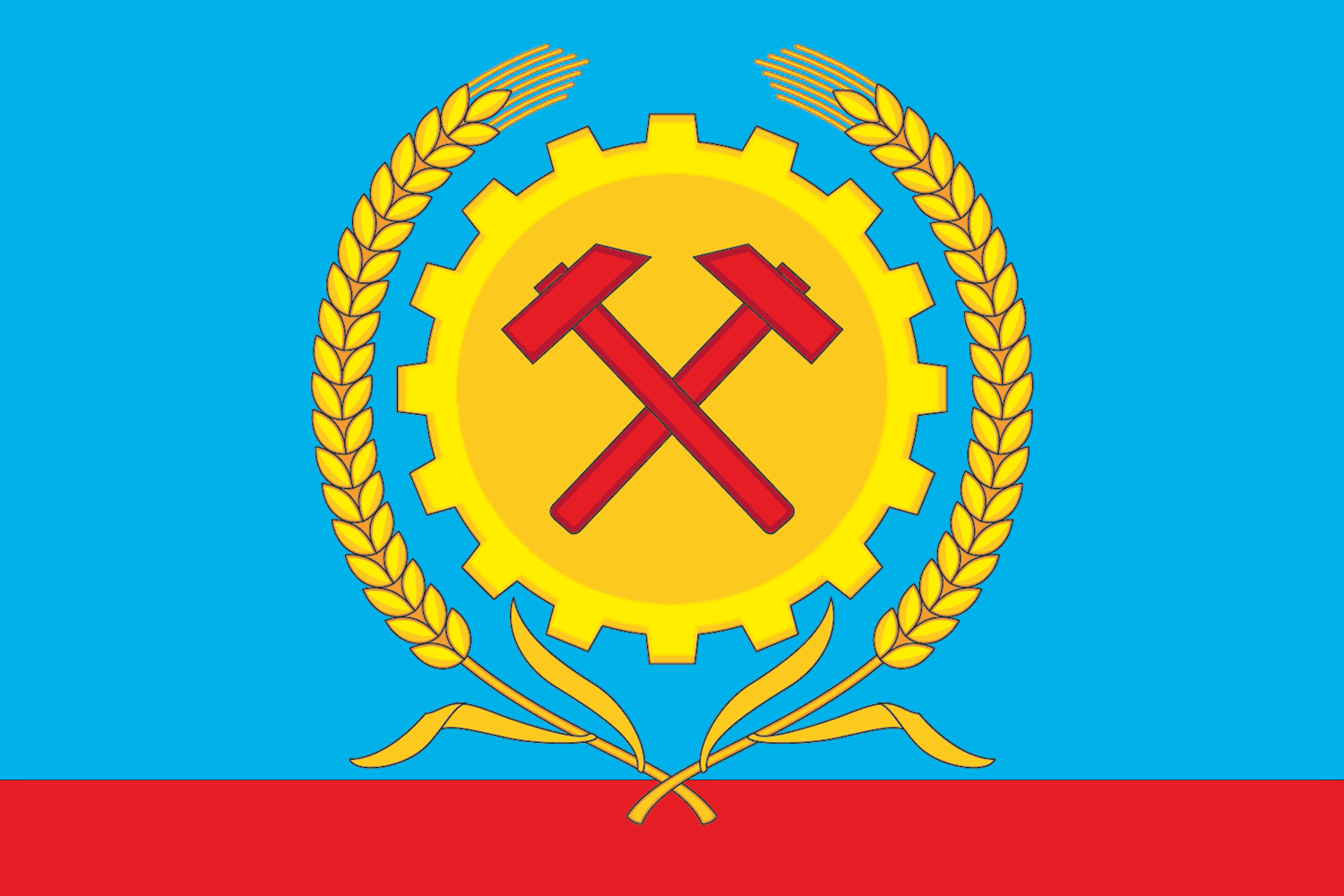
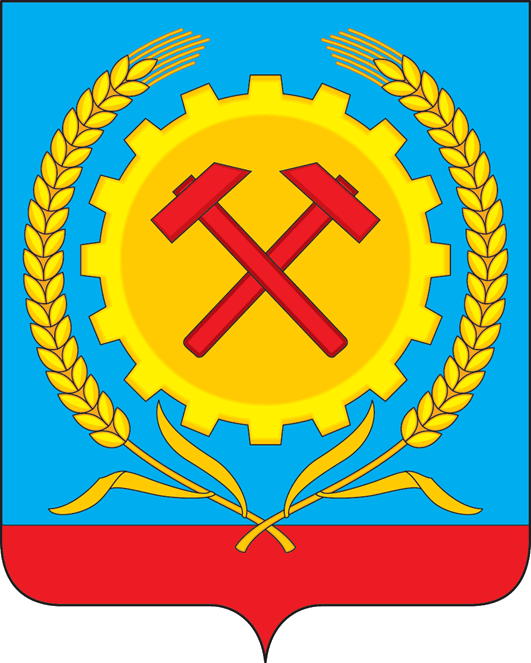
- Flag Coat of arms
- Interactive map of Povorino
- Location of Povorino Povorino (Voronezh Oblast)
- Coordinates: 51°12′N 42°15′E
- Country: Russia
- Federal subject: Voronezh Oblast
- Administrative district: Povorinsky District
- Urban settlementSelsoviet: Povorino
- Founded: 1870
- Town status since: June 3, 1954
- Elevation: 115 m (377 ft)

Population (2010 Census)
  - Total: 17,692
  - Estimate (2025): 16,224 (−8.3%)

Administrative status
  - Capital of: Povorinsky District, Povorino Urban Settlement

Municipal status
  - Municipal district: Povorinsky Municipal District
  - Urban settlement: Povorino Urban Settlement
  - Capital of: Povorinsky Municipal District, Povorino Urban Settlement
- Time zone: UTC+3 (MSK)
- Postal codes: 397350, 397351, 397354, 397355
- OKTMO ID: 20639101001
- Website: www.povorinosity.ru

Povorino (Russian: Пово́рино) is a town and the administrative center of Povorinsky District in the east of Voronezh Oblast, Russia. Population: 16,417 (2021 census); 17,692 (2010 census); 18,342 (2002 census); 19,450 (1989 Soviet census).

== History ==
It emerged as a settlement around the eponymous railway station in 1870 and was granted town status in 1954.

== Administrative and municipal status ==
Within the framework of administrative divisions, Povorino serves as the administrative center of Povorinsky District. As an administrative division, it is incorporated within Povorinsky District as Povorino Urban Settlement. As a municipal division, this administrative unit also has urban settlement status and is a part of Povorinsky Municipal District.

== Transportation ==
A junction of railroads and motorways, the town is situated between Tambov and Volgograd on European route E119 from Moscow to Astara, Azerbaijan. The town was home to Povorino air base during the Cold War.
