= Povorinsky District =

Povorinsky District Поворинский район (Russian)
- District
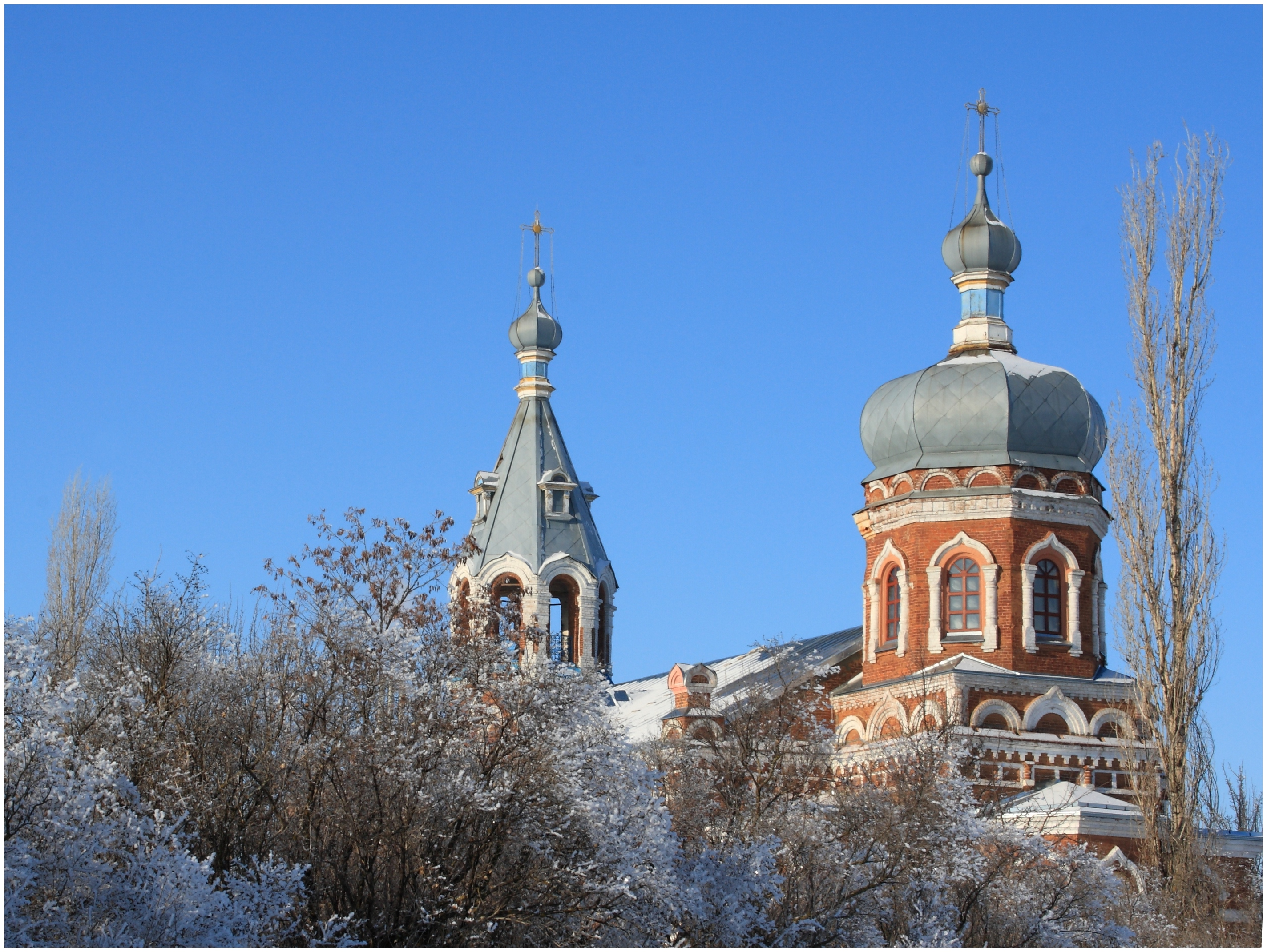
- Church of the Nativity in Povorino, Povorinsky District

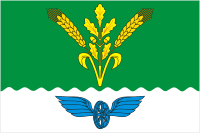
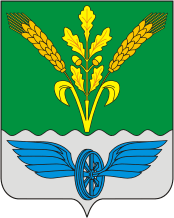
- Flag Coat of arms
- Location of Povorinsky District in Voronezh Oblast
- Coordinates: 51°12′N 42°15′E
- Country: Russia
- Federal subject: Voronezh Oblast
- Established: 1946
- Administrative center: Povorino

Area
  - Total: 1,066 km^{2} (412 sq mi)

Population (2010 Census)
  - Total: 34,030
  - Density: 31.92/km^{2} (82.68/sq mi)
  - Urban: 52.0%
  - Rural: 48.0%

Administrative structure
  - Administrative divisions: 1 Urban settlements, 8 Rural settlements
  - Inhabited localities: 1 cities/towns, 19 rural localities

Municipal structure
  - Municipally incorporated as: Povorinsky Municipal District
  - Municipal divisions: 1 urban settlements, 8 rural settlements
- Time zone: UTC+3 (MSK)
- OKTMO ID: 20639000
- Website: http://www.adminpovorino.ru/

Povorinsky District (Russian: Пово́ринский райо́н) is an administrative and municipal district (raion), one of the thirty-two in Voronezh Oblast, Russia. It is located in the northeast of the oblast. The area of the district is 1,066 square kilometers (412 sq mi). Its administrative center is the town of Povorino. Population: 31,119 (2021 census); 34,030 (2010 census); 17,475 (2002 census); 18,325 (1989 Soviet census). The population of Povorino accounts for 52.8% of the district's total population.
