= Petrovsk-Zabaykalsky (town) =

Petrovsk-Zabaykalsky Петровск-Забайкальский
- Town
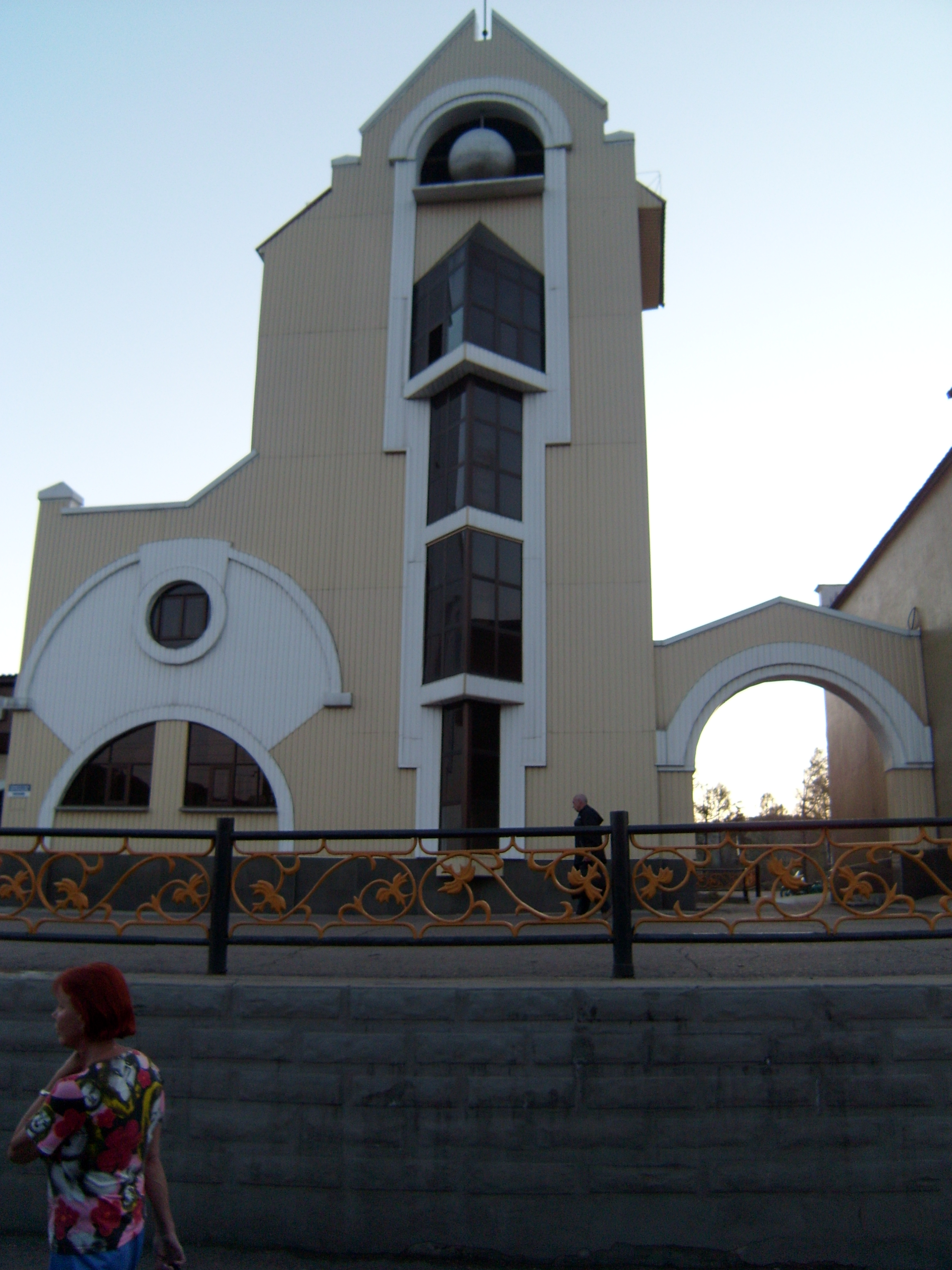

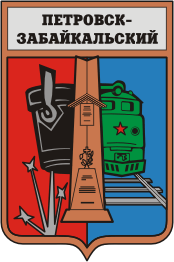
- Coat of arms
- Interactive map of Petrovsk-Zabaykalsky
- Location of Petrovsk-Zabaykalsky Petrovsk-Zabaykalsky (Zabaykalsky Krai)
- Coordinates: 51°16′N 108°50′E
- Country: Russia
- Federal subject: Zabaykalsky Krai
- Administrative district: Petrovsk-Zabaykalsky District
- Founded: 1789
- Town status since: 1926
- Elevation: 800 m (2,600 ft)

Population (2010 Census)
  - Total: 18,549
  - Estimate (1 January 2018): 16,213 (−12.6%)

Administrative status
  - Capital of: Petrovsk-Zabaykalsky District

Municipal status
  - Urban okrug: Petrovsk-Zabaykalsky Urban Okrug
  - Capital of: Petrovsk-Zabaykalsky Urban Okrug
- Time zone: UTC+9 (MSK+6)
- Postal code: 423364
- OKTMO ID: 76715000001

Petrovsk-Zabaykalsky (Russian: Петровск-Забайкальский, IPA: [pʲɪˈtrofsk zəbɐjˈkalʲskʲɪj]) is a town and the administrative center of Petrovsk-Zabaykalsky District of Zabaykalsky Krai, Russia, located along the Balyaga River in the valley between Zagan-Daban and Zagorinsky mountain ranges, 413 kilometers (257 mi) southwest of Chita. Population: 18,549 (2010 census); 21,164 (2002 census); 28,291 (1989 Soviet census).

== History ==
Before the exploration expeditions of the Russian Cossacks in the 17th century, the future Petrovsk-Zabaykalsky's location was a route junction of nomadic Buryat tribes. Peter the Great granted the heads of the tribes with principality. The settlement, founded in 1789 and known then as Petrovsky Zavod (Петровский Завод), grew and developed around its iron refinery. From 1830 to 1839, it was a detention place for seventy-one Decembrists and ten of their wives, who were sent here from Chita. There is a commemorating mark on the railway station. In a restored house of the princess Ekaterina Troubetskaya, wife of Sergey Trubetskoy, was organized a museum, which opened on October 10, 1980. In Petrovsk-Zabaykalsky's historical district there are several buildings related to the times of Decembrists in the town.

In 1926, the settlement was granted town status and given its present name.

In 1940, a new iron refinery was built, which was one of the most important iron factories in the region during the following decades.

== Administrative and municipal status ==
Within the framework of administrative divisions, Petrovsk-Zabaykalsky serves as the administrative center of Petrovsk-Zabaykalsky District and is subordinated to it. As a municipal division, the town of Petrovsk-Zabaykalsky is incorporated as Petrovsk-Zabaykalsky Urban Okrug.

== Economy and transportation ==
There is a glass plant, a sawmill, and food factories in Petrovsk-Zabaykalsky. The town is a railroad station on the Trans-Siberian Railway, and on the Chita–Ulan-Ude route.
