= Petrovsk-Zabaykalsky District =

Petrovsk-Zabaykalsky District Петровск-Забайкальский район (Russian)
- District
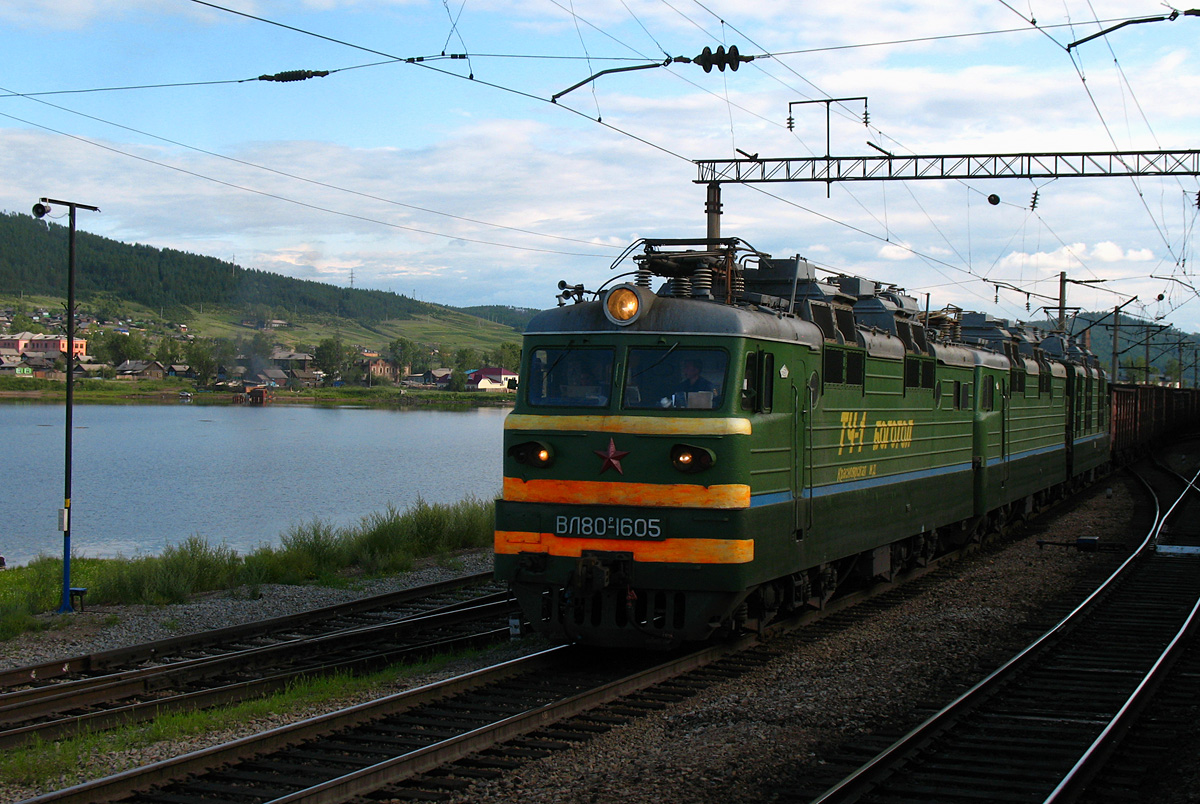
- Train at Petrovsky Zavod railway station in the town of Petrovsk-Zabaykalsky

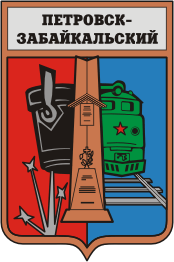
- Coat of arms
- Location of Petrovsk-Zabaykalsky District in Zabaykalsky Krai
- Coordinates: 50°59′N 109°03′E
- Country: Russia
- Federal subject: Zabaykalsky Krai
- Established: January 4, 1926
- Administrative center: Petrovsk-Zabaykalsky

Area
  - Total: 8,700 km^{2} (3,400 sq mi)

Population (2010 Census)
  - Total: 37,900
  - Estimate (2018): 17,289 (−54.4%)
  - Density: 4.4/km^{2} (11/sq mi)
  - Urban: 74.0%
  - Rural: 26.0%

Administrative structure
  - Inhabited localities: 1 cities/towns, 3 urban-type settlements, 22 rural localities

Municipal structure
  - Municipally incorporated as: Petrovsk-Zabaykalsky Municipal District
  - Municipal divisions: 3 urban settlements, 10 rural settlements
- Time zone: UTC+9 (MSK+6)
- OKTMO ID: 76636000
- Website: http://петровзаб.забайкальскийкрай.рф

Population of Petrovsk-Zabaykalsky District
- 2010 Census: 37,900
- 2002 Census: 21,110
- 1989 Census: 24,657
- 1979 Census: 25,757

Petrovsk-Zabaykalsky District (Russian: Петро́вск-Забайка́льский райо́н) is an administrative district (raion), one of the thirty-one in Zabaykalsky Krai, Russia. It is located in the southwest of the krai, and borders Khiloksky District in the east, Krasnochikoysky District in the south, and Bichursky District, Kizhinginsky District, Mukhorshibirsky District, Zaigrayevsky District of the Republic of Buryatia in the west and north. The area of the district is 8,700 square kilometers (3,400 sq mi). Its administrative center is the town of Petrovsk-Zabaykalsky. As of the 2010 Census, the total population of the district was 37,900, with the population of the administrative center accounting for 48.9% of that number.

== History ==
The district was established on January 4, 1926.

== Administrative and municipal status ==
Within the framework of administrative divisions, Petrovsk-Zabaykalsky District is one of the thirty-one in the krai. The town of Petrovsk-Zabaykalsky serves as its administrative center.

As a municipal division, the territory of the district is split between two municipal formations—Petrovsk-Zabaykalsky Municipal District, to which three urban-type settlements and twenty-two of the administrative district's rural localities belong, and Petrovsk-Zabaykalsky Urban Okrug, which covers the rest of the administrative district's territory, including the town of Petrovsk-Zabaykalsky.
