= Novonikolayevsky, Volgograd Oblast =

Novonikolayevsky Новониколаевский
- Work settlement
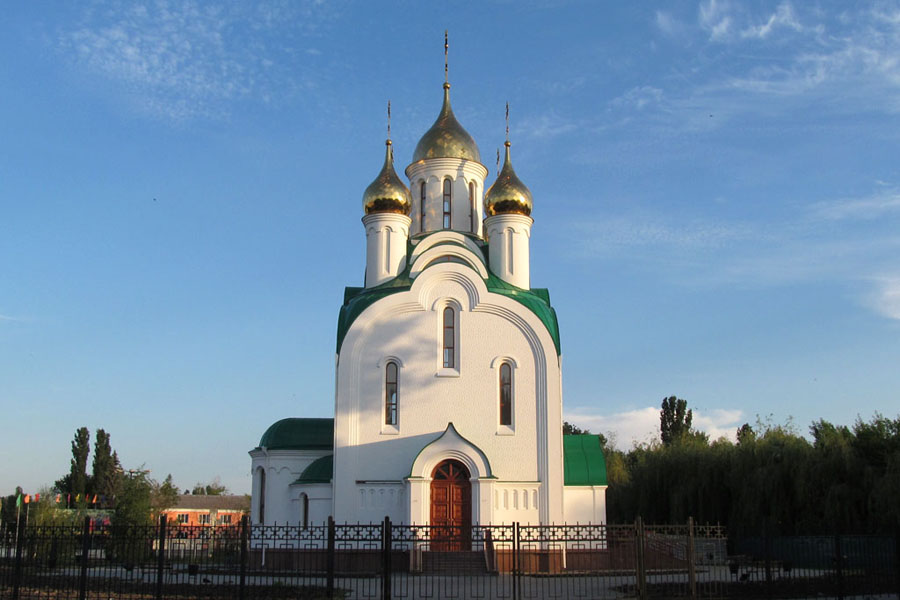
- Church in Novonikolayevsky
- Interactive map of Novonikolayevsky
- Location of Novonikolayevsky Novonikolayevsky (Volgograd Oblast)
- Coordinates: 50°58′N 42°22′E
- Country: Russia
- Federal subject: Volgograd Oblast
- Administrative district: Novonikolayevsky District
- Founded: 1870

Population (2010 Census)
  - Total: 9,931
  - Estimate (2021): 9,059 (−8.8%)

Administrative status
  - Capital of: Novonikolayevsky District
- Time zone: UTC+3 (MSK)
- Postal code: 403901
- OKTMO ID: 18640151051

Novonikolayevsky (Russian: Новоникола́евский) is an urban locality (a work settlement) and the administrative center of Novonikolayevsky District in Volgograd Oblast, Russia. Population: 9,931 (2010 census); 10,228 (2002 census); 10,795 (1989 Soviet census).
