= Novonikolayevsky District =

Novonikolayevsky District Новониколаевский район (Russian)
- District
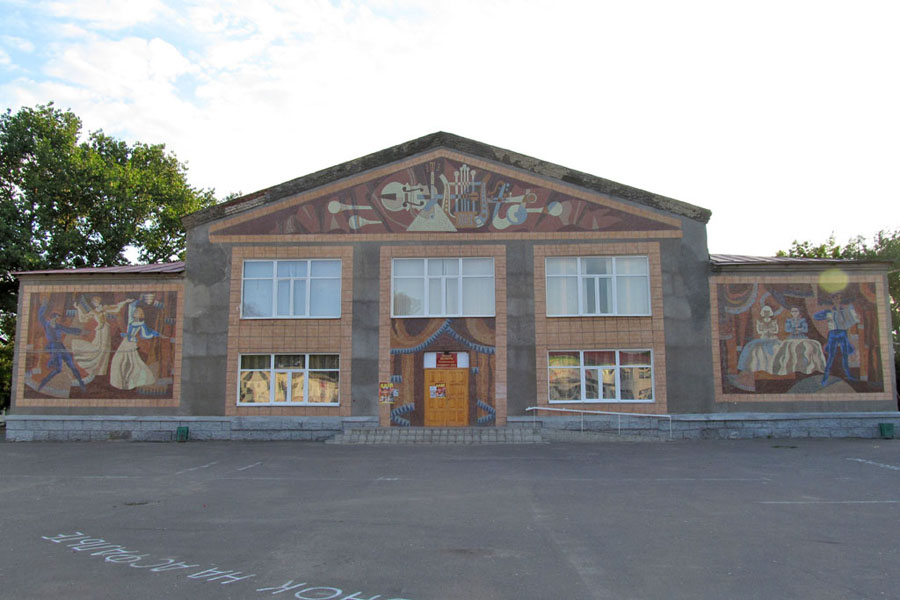
- House of Culture in Novonikolayevsky, Novonikolayevsky District

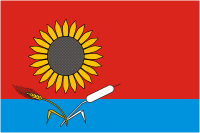
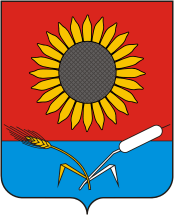
- Flag Coat of arms
- Location of Novonikolayevsky District in Volgograd Oblast
- Coordinates: 50°58′N 42°22′E
- Country: Russia
- Federal subject: Volgograd Oblast
- Established: 1928
- Administrative center: Novonikolayevsky

Area
  - Total: 2,362 km^{2} (912 sq mi)

Population (2010 Census)
  - Total: 22,618
  - Density: 9.576/km^{2} (24.80/sq mi)
  - Urban: 43.9%
  - Rural: 56.1%

Administrative structure
  - Administrative divisions: 1 Urban-type settlements, 10 Selsoviets
  - Inhabited localities: 1 urban-type settlements, 49 rural localities

Municipal structure
  - Municipally incorporated as: Novonikolayevsky Municipal District
  - Municipal divisions: 1 urban settlements, 10 rural settlements
- Time zone: UTC+3 (MSK)
- OKTMO ID: 18640000
- Website: moyaokruga.ru

Novonikolayevsky District (Russian: Новоникола́евский райо́н) is an administrative district (raion), one of the thirty-three in Volgograd Oblast, Russia. As a municipal division, it is incorporated as Novonikolayevsky Municipal District. It is located in the northwest of the oblast. The area of the district is 2,362 square kilometers (912 sq mi). Its administrative center is the urban locality (a work settlement) of Novonikolayevsky. Population: 22,618 (2010 census); 25,511 (2002 Census); 27,826 (1989 Soviet census). The population of the administrative center accounts for 43.9% of the district's total population.
