= 255th Division =

255th Division may refer to:

- 255th Infantry Division, Wehrmacht, Germany
- 255th Rifle Division, Soviet Union, later the 254th Motor Rifle Division

== See also ==
- List of military divisions by number
