= 256th Division =

256th Division may refer to:

- 256th Infantry Division, Wehrmacht, Germany
- 256th Rifle Division, Soviet Union, later the 254th Motor Rifle Division

== See also ==
- List of military divisions by number
