= 252nd Rifle Division =

Military unit

- Sappers of the division stringing barbed wire, 19 November 1941
- Active: June 1941 – May 1947
- Country: Soviet Union
- Branch: Red Army
- Type: Infantry
- Size: Division
- Engagements: Battle of Smolensk (1941); Operation Typhoon; Battle of Moscow; Battle of Stalingrad; Operation Uranus; Operation Koltso; Battle of Kursk; Belgorod-Kharkov Offensive Operation; Lower Dnieper Offensive; Uman–Botoșani Offensive; First Jassy–Kishinev Offensive; Second Jassy–Kishinev Offensive; Siege of Budapest; Lake Balaton Offensive; Bratislava–Brno Offensive; Vienna Offensive; Prague Offensive
- Decorations: Order of the Red Banner; Order of Suvorov; Order of Bogdan Khmelnitsky
- Battle honours: Kharkov; Bratislava

Commanders
- Notable commanders: Viktor Urbanovich; Georgy Anisimov

The 252nd Rifle Division was the eighth of a group of 10 regular rifle divisions formed from cadres of NKVD border and internal troops as standard Red Army rifle divisions, very shortly after the German invasion, in the Moscow Military District.

It was raised in June 1941, within days of the beginning of Operation Barbarossa, the German invasion of the Soviet Union, based on the prewar rifle division Shtat 04/400, and served for the duration of the Great Patriotic War in that role. The 252nd's first experience of battle was when it took part in the fighting north of Smolensk in the summer of 1941. It was forced eastward in the autumn, especially under the impact of Operation Typhoon. After helping to defeat an offensive by Third Panzer Group at Kalinin in October, and serving through the winter counteroffensive west of Moscow, the division was sent south where it participated in the Battle of Stalingrad.

In the summer of 1943 the 252nd distinguished itself in the final liberation of Kharkov, for which it received its first battle honor, as well as the Order of the Red Banner. Following this the division continued to fight through eastern and western Ukraine and into Moldova, receiving further distinctions along the way. It took part in the Second Jassy–Kishinev Offensive in August 1944, which drove Romania into the Allied camp, and continued campaigning into Hungary, participating in the Siege of Budapest. In the final weeks of the war the division received a second battle honor for assisting in the liberation of Bratislava. Postwar, it was withdrawn to the North Caucasus, downsized to a rifle brigade and disbanded in March 1947.

== Formation to mid-1942 ==
The division began organizing on 26 June 1941 (Note: Dunn, Jr. states it was in July, while Tretyakov writes that its formation began in June.) at Serpukhov in the Moscow Military District. It was one of a series of rifle divisions numbered between 240 and 260 that were built on cadres taken from the NKVD. The NKVD cadre consisted of 1,500 border guards and internal security troops, providing a solid, well-motivated core. Its order of battle was:

- 924th Rifle Regiment
- 928th Rifle Regiment
- 932nd Rifle Regiment
- 277th Artillery Regiment
- 270th Howitzer Regiment
- 309th Antitank Battalion
- 420th Sapper Battalion
- 332nd Reconnaissance Company
- 176th Signal Company
- 270th Medical/Sanitation Battalion
- 303rd Field Bakery

Colonel Aleksandr Alekseevich Zabaluev, an NKVD officer, was named divisional commander on 5 July, and was promoted to major general ten days later. After Zabaluev arrived the division moved to Ostashkov. It was assigned to the 29th Army of Lieutenant General Ivan Maslennikov in the Reserve of the Supreme High Command by 13 July, less than three weeks after beginning to form. The 29th Army formed part of Lieutenant General Ivan Bogdanov's Front Reserve of Reserve Armies, which was to hold a defensive line from Staraya Russa to Bryansk.

=== Battle of Smolensk ===
By 19 July the 19th, 20th and 16th Armies were almost entirely encircled in the Smolensk region, and 29th Army was ordered to prepare an attack from the Toropets area towards Velikiye Luki with its 243rd, 256th Rifle Division and 252nd Rifle Divisions. For this attack, the 29th, similarly to the other reserve armies, was designated as an operational group named after its commander – Group Maslennikov – and subordinated to the Western Front on 20 July. On 26 July the division was in the Dubrovna, Borodkina and Suslovo region, 20–30 km (12–19 mi) southwest of Toropets. The 252nd entered combat two days later, fighting in the Battle of Smolensk. On 3 August it was reported as "preparing to force the Western Dvina River and organize antitank regions" in several locales about 50 km (31 mi) south of Toropets, and had orders to attack towards Demidov in the second week of the month.

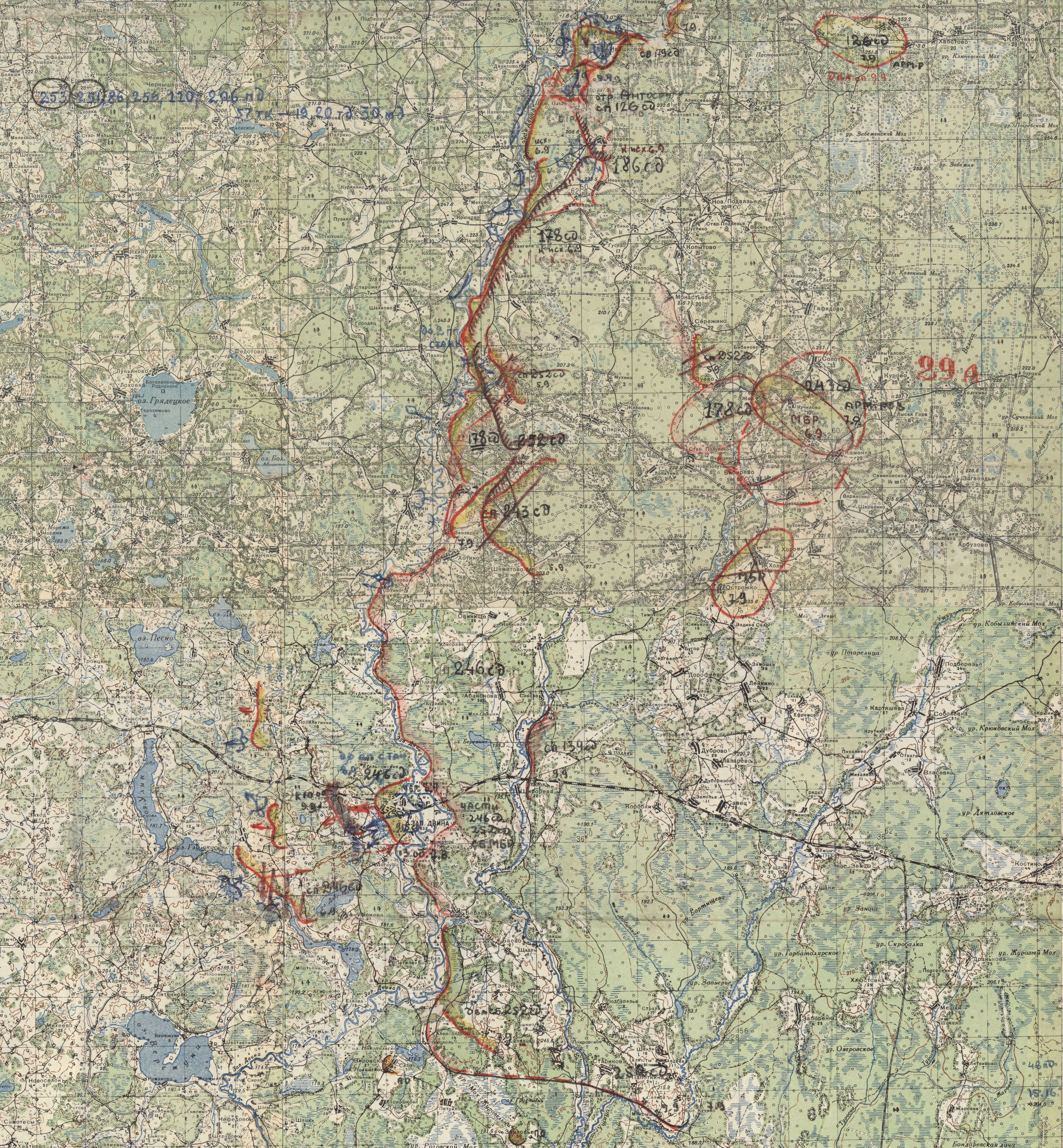
29th Army situation map from 7 August to 9 September 1941

Those plans were temporarily abandoned when the division came under attack on 7 August and its 928th and 932nd Rifle Regiments were forced to withdraw north of the Dvina. After a lull in the fighting, Western Front commander Marshal Semyon Timoshenko launched a new offensive, and the 252nd again attacked across the Dvina on 18 August, this time at Klinok. The 924th Regiment reported destroying the headquarters of the 3rd Battalion of the German 78th Infantry Regiment (26th Infantry Division) and capturing one gun, ammunition and documents. Despite its gains, the division was forced back to its original positions on the northern bank of the river by the end of the next day. By 20 August Timoshenko's forces came under renewed enemy pressure, and the division was forced back on the defensive. It was directed to establish an all-round defense by the end of 24 August north of the river. At the end of August the 252nd had to make a hasty retreat eastwards after the German XL Motorized Corps broke through the 22nd Army and advanced towards Toropets; the 932nd Regiment, with an artillery battalion and a sapper company, served as the rearguard. By 2 September the division was serving as Maslennikov's reserve in the Mukhino, Spiridovo and Novoe Polutino region. On the following day, together with the 126th Rifle Division of the 22nd Army, the division was tasked with the mission of liquidating a tank-supported German infantry regiment that had reached the Dvina in the Suvorovo region. On 4 September the 252nd continued counterattacking, driving back two German regiments with the help of the 243rd.

=== Typhoon, Winter Offensive, and Rzhev ===
On 2 October the German forces launched Operation Typhoon, during which the division covered the retreat of the 29th Army. Although the army was too far north to be immediately affected, it was transferred to the new Kalinin Front in the vicinity of that city during the middle of the month. The 252nd was transferred to the newly-arriving 31st Army, and on 19–20 October participated in the counterattacks that defeated the XXXXI Motorized Corps along the Torzhok road northwest of Kalinin. The division continued to fight in what became known as the Kalinin Defense Operation. When the Soviet counter-offensive against Army Group Center – known as the Kalinin Offensive Operation – began in early December, the division reported a strength of 5,800 officers and men, about half of its authorized strength, a good strength given four months of fighting in retreat. During the Kalinin Offensive the 252nd participated in the recapture of the city on 16 December, and the recapture of Staritsa on New Year's Day 1942. On the latter date, Zabaluev was replaced by Major General Viktor Urbanovich, taking command by 5 January.

From 20 January the division fought in the Sychyovka–Vyazma and Rzhev–Vyazma Offensives during the Battles of Rzhev as part of the 39th Army. On that day, it attacked towards the Osuga railway station south of Rzhev during the Rzhev–Vyazma Offensive, tasked with reaching the Rzhev-Vyazma railway from the west. During the offensive, the division captured the strongpoints of Monchalovo and Popovka, going on the defensive fifteen kilometers southwest of Osuga station. It was cut off by a German counterattack in the area of Rzhev and Olenino, but fought on in semi-encirclement between February and June, supplied only by a small corridor in the Nesterovo area. During the winter, the 309th Antitank Battalion was removed to Army control (the Howitzer Regiment had been removed earlier) but was replaced by the 110th Antitank Battalion when the division was reorganized in the spring of 1942. Between 2 and 5 July German forces cut off the 39th Army in Operation Seydlitz with converging attacks on Nesterovo from Bely and Karskaya, fully encircling the division northwest of Vyazma. The 252nd managed to break out on 22 July to the northeast of Bely and regrouped near Selizharovo.

== Battle of Stalingrad ==
The 252nd went into the Reserve of the Supreme High Command in early August 1942, first assigned to the 4th Reserve Army before being moved to 10th Reserve Army before the end of the month. At this time the division personnel were about 60 percent Yakut, with most of the rest being Russian. On 27 August, Urbanovich was replaced in command by Colonel Zinovy Samoilovich Shekhtman. From August to October, the division was rebuilt as part of the Reserve of the Supreme High Command at Vereshchagino, Molotov Oblast.

The division was ordered to return to the front on 1 October along with six other rebuilt rifle divisions to join the armies of the Don Front north and west of Stalingrad. It was initially allocated to the 66th Army. On 20 October it formed part of the Army's shock group as Don Front staged its fourth attempt to break through the German-held corridor from the Don to the Volga from the north and reach the 62nd Army besieged in the city. The attack began at 0800 hours and had advanced into the enemy defensive belt by 10:00 In the course of this fighting the 252nd captured the Hill 130.7 region, 6 km (3.7 mi) northeast of Kuzmichi, and the road junction 2 km (1.2 mi) east of that position. The next day the division continued fighting along much the same lines. On 22 October it captured the region of the Motor Tractor Station 8 km (5.0 mi) northeast of Kuzmichi, and made a further advance of 700–800 m (770–870 yd) the next day, taking Hill 139.7. By this time the division was badly depleted, and the 226th Rifle Division passed through its positions to take up the advance, but made little further progress and the Army went over to the defense on 27 October. As of 1 November the 252nd was back in the Front reserve.

=== Operation Uranus ===
In the buildup to the November counteroffensive the division was transferred to 65th Army. According to a General Staff report of 14 November,

...During the transfer of 252nd... RD to 65th Army the transport means were meager... and the transport of all kinds of supplies is being carried out with interruptions (owing to poor supply, 252nd [has] only 62–63% of [its] required combat load and 3 men... have perished because of the absence of warm clothing).

In the Army's deployment the division was north of the Kletskaya bridgehead south of the Don, in second echelon behind the 304th Rifle Division. They were facing the boundary between the Romanian 1st Cavalry and German 376th Infantry Divisions. The operation began on the morning of 19 November. The 304th began its main advance at 08:50 following an 80-minute artillery bombardment which was hampered by low visibility. The Army commander, Lieutenant General Pavel Batov, wrote that this division "was forced to the ground in front of Melo-Kletskaia." It had encountered skillfully fortified strongpoints manned by German troops that it could not overcome. Further, they faced nearly constant counterattacks from 376th Infantry Division, supported later in the day by elements of 14th Panzer Division. However, one battalion of the 807th Rifle Regiment made a limited breakthrough, and overnight Batov devised a plan to exploit this. The 252nd, which had crossed into the bridgehead, was to attack at the boundary of the 304th and 27th Guards Rifle Divisions when the fighting reached its crescendo.

Positions of the division between 19 November 1942 and 2 February 1943, marked in red lines

Shortly after dawn on the 20th those two divisions pushed deeply into the Romanian defenses, and at about 10:00 the 252nd began pushing through at the boundary, soon penetrating the first two enemy defensive positions. Shortly after noon a mobile group, made up of about 45 T-34 and KV tanks from 91st Tank Brigade, with submachine gunners riding on their decks, accompanied by motorized infantry and artillery, all under the command of Colonel Georgy Anisimov, began advancing into this breach. By nightfall it had advanced 23 km (14 mi) into the left rear of German XI Army Corps. Meanwhile, the 252nd advanced 2–4 km (1.2–2.5 mi) southeastward against stiffening Axis resistance. Next day 65th Army had five rifle divisions on the attack, registering gains from 1 to 10 km (0.62 to 6.21 mi). Due to Anisimov's armored raid the German 376th Infantry was forced to withdraw eastwards, and Romanian 1st Cavalry abandoned the town of Orekhovskii.

22 November saw the division, along with the 27th Guards, attacking elements of the 14th Panzer Division. By the end of the day that division was forced to withdraw eastwards, in spite of being reinforced by the 132nd Infantry Regiment of 44th Infantry Division. The following day the 252nd continued to throw the German armor and supporting infantry back about 5 km (3.1 mi) to the southeast as they evacuated their tenuous salient west of the Don. On 24 November, after the Soviet encirclement of the Axis forces at Stalingrad had been achieved, 65th Army pressed on, and the division helped to force the German divisions farther east to new defensive positions, advancing about 10 km (6.2 mi) during the day. At nightfall it had reached positions overlooking the Sukhaia Golubaika ravine. By the morning of 25 November the salient had been reduced to about 18 km^{2} (6.9 mi^{2}), and now included elements of the 16th Panzer Division and five infantry regiments.

Over the following days Batov continued to reduce the German salient. On 25 November the 252nd reported: "During the day 103 vehicles, 3 aircraft, 52 guns, and 32 antitank guns were seized." By nightfall the bridgehead had been reduced by a further 50 percent in area. Overnight several divisions were transferred from 65th Army to 5th Tank Army, but the pursuit continued at dawn with the 252nd, 304th and 24th Rifle Divisions, with 91st Tank Brigade back in support of the 304th. Both it and the 252nd advanced several kilometres before being halted by enemy fire from Hill 204.0. Meanwhile, the XI Corps' commander systematically withdrew his remaining men to east of the Don, completing the operation and blowing the bridge on the 27th at about 03:40. Later that morning the division reached the river, threw forward detachments across to the east bank, and captured Akimovskii at 09:00. The German corps continued to fall back, abandoning Vertiachii by noon on 29 November. However, the next day the pursuit came to an abrupt halt as 65th Army came up to the heavy fire and extensive obstacles of Sixth Army's new main defensive line.

The first test of these defenses came on 4 December. The 252nd, with the 24th Rifle and 27th Guards Rifle, backed by the 304th, "tore one gaping hole and several lesser gaps in the defenses of VIII Army Corps' 44th Infantry Division." According to a report from Sixth Army to Army Group Don a break-in 1,000 metres wide and 2,000 metres deep had been made northeast of Dmitrievka, apparently the work of the 252nd. German counterattacks over the next 24 hours drove the division back, with the loss of 200 killed and 20 prisoners. In the end the German line was mostly restored, but the 24th Division clung to Hill 124.5 (Chernyi Kurgan), which remained a thorn in the side of the 44th Infantry during the coming weeks.

Shekhtman was replaced by Anisimov on 5 December, who would be promoted to the rank of major general on 27 January 1943. On 6 and 7 December the German counterattacks continued, and the 252nd was directed north to back up the 24th Division on Chernyi Kurgan. During the month the division came under command of the 21st Army. While there were no further major offensive operations during the month, local attacks by the 252nd and several other divisions caused heavy losses to the 44th and 376th Infantry Divisions on 28 and 29 December.

=== Operation Ring ===
As of January 1943, the division had about 50 percent personnel of Kazakh and Uzbek nationality, while the remainder were split between Yakut and Russian. When Don Front began its offensive to reduce the Stalingrad pocket on 10 January the 252nd had returned to 65th Army and was in the Army's reserves. During the first two days the Army's main forces made steady progress against the much-weakened VIII Corps and XIV Panzer Corps. General Batov committed the division on 12 January, to the right of the 304th Division, and it soon found a gap between the two German corps, reaching the west bank of the Rossoshka River and cutting the withdrawal route of the 29th Motorized Division. It also assisted the 173rd Rifle and 51st Guards Rifle Divisions in a southward thrust of 4 km (2.5 mi) which reached to within 1–3 km (0.62–1.86 mi) of Karpovka by nightfall.

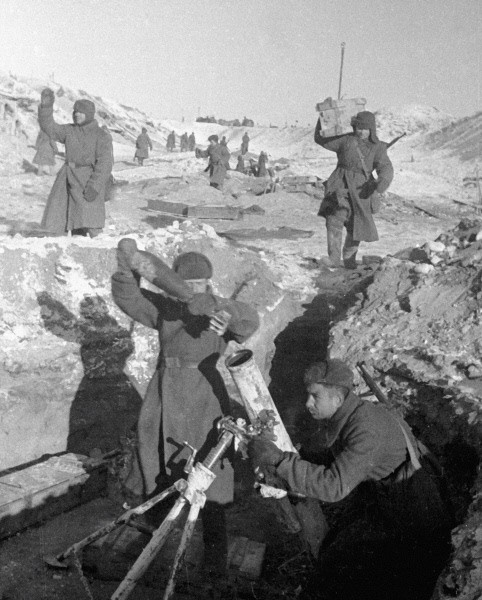
Red Army mortarmen firing at German positions during Operation Ring, late January

The following day the 252nd, along with the 173rd, was again transferred to 21st Army, which was facing weaker opposition than the 65th. The immediate mission was to liberate Karpovka, then push eastward to seize Pitomnik airfield, one of the main remaining depots for the Sixth Army airlift. On 16 January this was taken with the help of 51st Guards, and the German forces in the Stalingrad pocket were reduced to using the more distant Gumrak for their inadequate air supplies. Later that day a counterattack by most of the remaining tanks of 14th Panzer Division damaged the division and forced the Army commander to shift fresh forces to its sector.

There was a lull in the fighting from 18–21 January for the refitting of Don Front's forces. When the offensive resumed the 252nd was roughly in the center of the 21st Army's 9 km (5.6 mi)-wide attack sector, about 5 km (3.1 mi) west of Gumrak. By nightfall on 23 January the division had pushed about 4 km (2.5 mi) eastward, clearing the remnants of 29th Motorized from the village strongpoint at Talovoi. Two days later the advance forces of the Army reached to the fringes of Stalingrad proper, while the 252nd helped to seize Hill 122.5, from 2 to 4 km (1.2 to 2.5 mi) northeast of Lesoposadochnaia village. The final advance began on 26 January with six of the Army's rifle divisions advancing into the center of the city from the hills to the west. While elements of the Army linked up with the 13th Guards and 284th Rifle Divisions, the remainder continued advancing against surprisingly strong resistance from the remnants of XIV Panzer Corps. By this time, most of Don Front's rifle divisions were reduced to regimental strength.

The next day the division was rotated out of the line for rest, returning on 30 January for the final act, although it was held back from the immediate front lines to be available against unexpected developments. After the surrender of the German forces in Stalingrad on 3 February, the 252nd remained in the region as part of the Stalingrad Group of Forces until 1 March, participating in the mopping up of German holdouts.

== Rebuilding, Operation Rumyantsev, and the Battle of the Dnieper ==
By this time the main preoccupation of the STAVKA was the German successes in the first phases of the Third Battle of Kharkov. It began reassigning its reserve forces in the south on the evening of 28 February. The 252nd was reassigned to the 24th Army with a directive to the Army's commander:

"... Re-station six rifle divisions (the 68th and 69th Guards, 84th, 214th, 233rd and 252nd) to the Valuiki region in the composition of 24th Army in the Reserve of Supreme High Command."

As the crisis deepened, on 12 March the STAVKA ordered the creation of a Reserve Front, to which 24th Army was assigned. During March and April the division received replacements and was reorganized along new tables of organization and equipment in the area of the Kolodeznaya railway station. On 3 May the division was assigned to 53rd Army, still in the High Command Reserve. Just prior to the German summer offensive 53rd Army was part of the Steppe Military District, which became Steppe Front when the Battle of Kursk began. Shortly after the enemy offensive ended 53rd Army was transferred to Voronezh Front. The 252nd was in second echelon when the Army began its offensive towards Kharkov on 3 August, and so distinguished itself in the fighting for that city that it was awarded its name as a battle honor when the city was captured on 23 August, one of the first such honorifics awarded:

KHARKOV ...252nd Rifle Division (Maj. Gen. Anisimov, Georgii Ivanovich)... The troops who participated in the liberation of Kharkov, by the order of the Supreme High Command of August 23, 1944, and a commendation in Moscow, are given a salute of 20 artillery salvoes from 224 guns.

Two days later the division was further recognized with the award of the Order of the Red Banner. Attacking towards Poltava, the division captured Liubotyn in cooperation with the 84th Rifle Division on 29 August. On 20 September Anisimov, who had been promoted to corps command, was replaced in command by Colonel Ivan Aleksandrovich Gorbachyov, who was in turn replaced by Colonel Ivan Semyonovich Frolov on 15 October. During the Battle of the Dnieper, on the night of 1 October, the 252nd crossed the river in the area of Chkalova, Kremenchuk Raion, Poltava Oblast, and captured a bridgehead on the right bank. Gorbachyov was concussed during the fighting for the bridgehead on 7 October and spent more than a month into the hospital, returning to command on 11 November. He continued to lead the division for the rest of the war, being promoted to major general on 10 April 1944.

== Kirovograd to Prague ==
The division remained in 53rd Army for the rest of the year, then transferred to 4th Guards Army in 2nd Ukrainian Front on 9 January 1944. It remained in this front through the spring and summer, in either 4th Guards or 52nd Army. The division fought in the Kirovograd Offensive during the first half of January and the Korsun–Shevchenkovsky Offensive between late January and February. It was transferred to the 52nd Army on 13 February. During the Uman–Botoșani Offensive, on 19 March the 252nd was recognized for its role in the liberation of Uman with the Order of Bogdan Khmelnitsky, 2nd degree. After crossing the Dniester, it helped capture the key rail junction and city of Beltsy on 26 March. For these actions, in addition to its reaching the Soviet border, the division was awarded the Order of Suvorov, 2nd class, on 8 April. From 10 April the division participated in defensive actions at Bursuceni and Teșcureni in Bessarabia with the 78th Rifle Corps of 52nd Army. With the corps, it returned to the 4th Guards Army on 16 August to fight in the Jassy–Kishinev Offensive. In the latter, it helped to defeat the German-Romanian forces around Jassy and Kishinev, and took part in the capture of Ungheni on 22 August. From 9 September to 5 October it was once again withdrawn to the Reserve of the Supreme High Command for rebuilding at Lutsk, then relocated to Arad with the army. As part of this, the 110th Antitank Battalion was re-equipped with 12 SU-76 self-propelled guns.

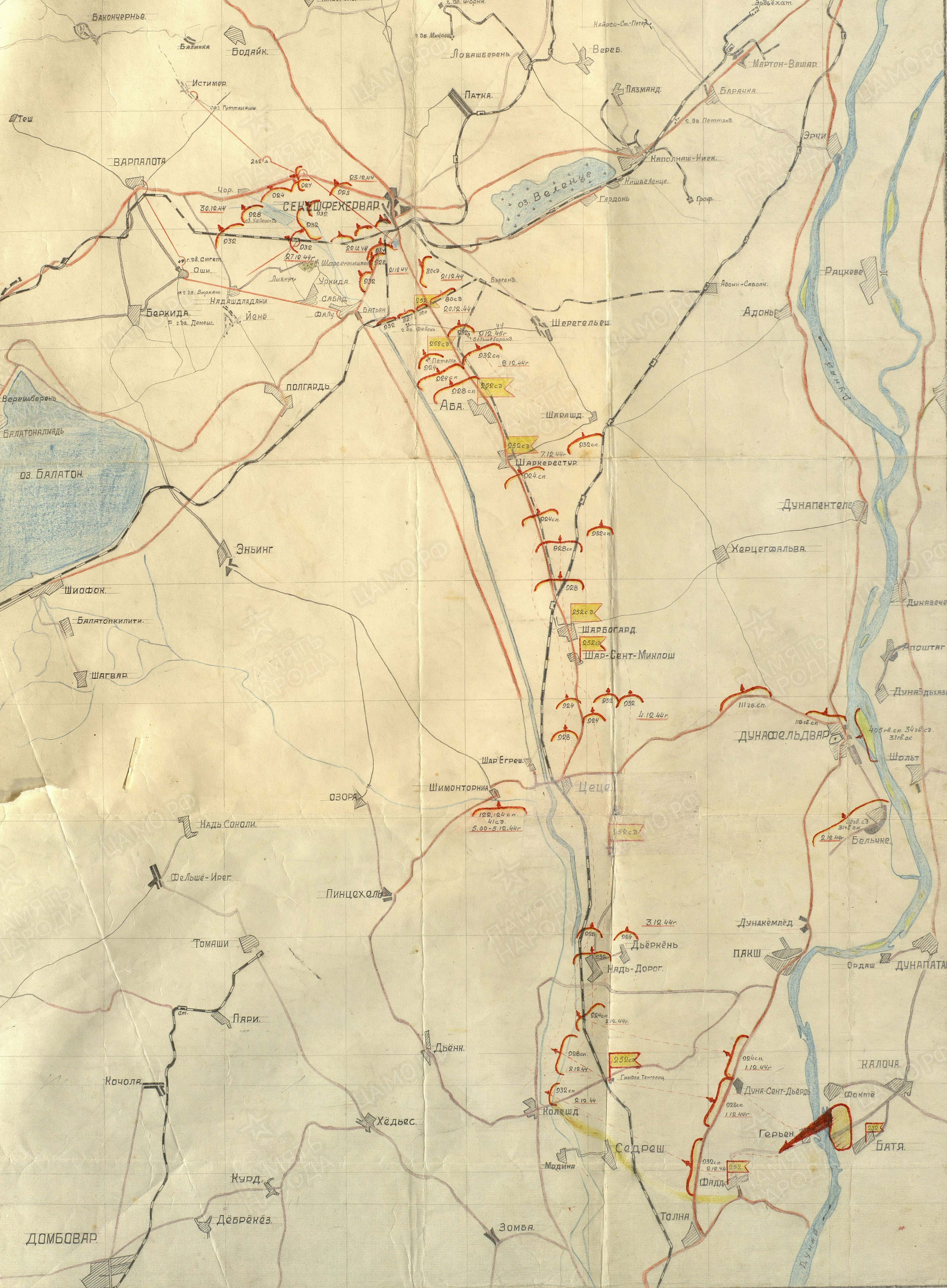
Positions of the division during the advance from the Danube to Székesfehérvár

With the 4th Guards Army, the division was transferred to the 4th Ukrainian Front on 3 November and reconcentrated in Hungary, where it fought in the Budapest Offensive. During this, the division crossed the Danube on 1 December, establishing a bridgehead on the right bank, allowing for the ferrying of other units to it. The division went on to participate in the capture of Székesfehérvár on 23 December.

The division held positions north of Lake Balaton in mid-January, with the 1st Guards Fortified District to the south, as part of the 135th Rifle Corps. The main attack of Operation Konrad III, a counterattack launched by the German IV SS Panzer Corps in an attempt to relieve the Siege of Budapest. The brunt of the attack was borne by the 1st Guards Fortified District and the 928th Rifle Regiment, which held a front of 5 km (3.1 mi) on the left flank of the division. The German attack began at 06:30 on 18 January, and broke through the 1st Guards Fortified District, whose anti-tank capabilities proved too weak to stop Tiger II tanks. As a result, the 1st Panzer Division bypassed the left flank of the 252nd and entered its rear, surrounding the 928th, whose men broke out in small groups. To the right of the 928th, the 932nd Rifle Regiment retreated under German pressure to the line of a canal south of Székesfehérvár. The collapse of the Soviet lines allowed the German forces to reach the corps headquarters, disrupting command and control.

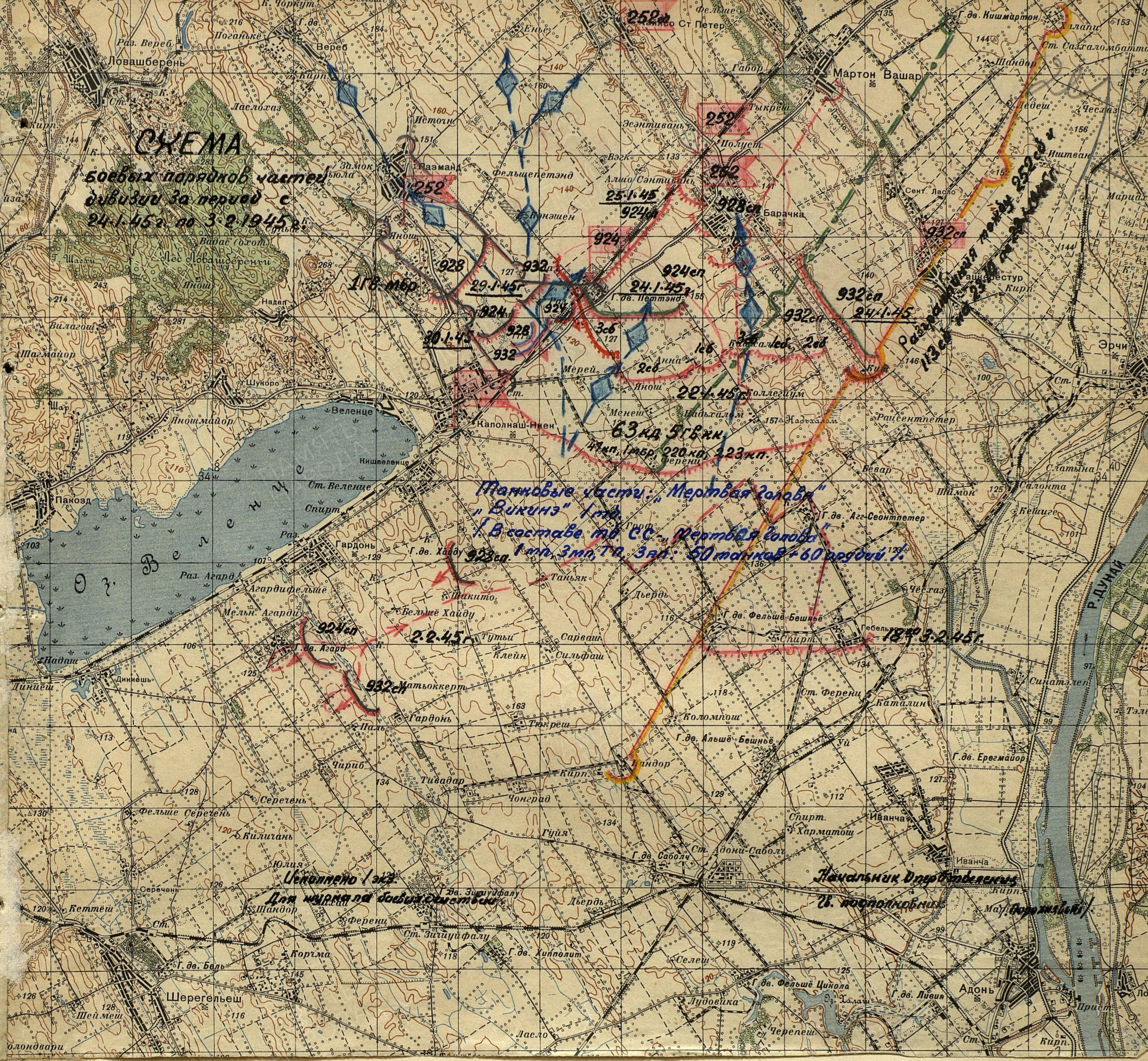
Positions of the division during Operation Konrad III

Elements of the 252nd, along with the 93rd Rifle Division, formed a defensive line on the Sárvíz Canal, where demolished bridges stopped the advance of the IV SS Panzer Corps' left flank. The lines of communication of the division were disrupted by Messerschmitt Bf 109 strafing and bombing attacks on 19 January due to temporary clear skies. By 10:00 on 22 January, the 252nd, whose sector was now relatively calm, took up positions behind the 5th Guards Cavalry Corps in the strip of land between Lake Velence and the Danube. On 24 January the 5th Guards retreated in the face of the German attack back to the line of the 252nd, which had suffered heavy losses at the beginning of Konrad III, but the defense in the sector held due to the introduction of Soviet mechanized forces and Ilyushin Il-2 air attacks on the German advance.

With the 46th Army from 3 February 1945 the division repulsed German attempts to break the siege in the Esztergom area. The division was transferred to the 23rd Rifle Corps on 19 February. With the 46th Army, it transferred back to the 2nd Ukrainian Front on 21 February. The 252nd fought in the Vienna Offensive from mid-March, capturing Komárom on 28 March and advancing to the Hungary-Czechoslovakia border. Crossing the Danube near the Szent Pál island on 30 March, it captured Komárno on the same day. The division was then transferred to the 7th Guards Army, with which it fought in the Bratislava–Brno Offensive, participating in the liberation of Bratislava on 4 April, for which it received the following honorific:

BRATISLAVA ...252nd Rifle Division (Maj. Gen. Gorbachyov, Ivan Alexsandrovich)... The troops who participated in the liberation of Bratislava, by the order of the Supreme High Command of April 4, 1945, and a commendation in Moscow, are given a salute of 20 artillery salvoes from 224 guns.

In the final days of the war, the 252nd fought in the Prague Offensive, pursuing retreating German forces. It linked up with the American 2nd Infantry Division at the village of Svojkovice east of Plzeň on 13 May. The division ended the war as the 252nd Kharkov-Bratislava Red Banner Orders of Suvorov and Bogdan Khmelnitsky Rifle Division (Russian: 252-я стрелковая Харьковско-Братиславская Краснознамённая орденов Суворова и Богдана Хмельницкого дивизия). During the war, fourteen men of the division received the title Hero of the Soviet Union.

== Postwar ==
After the end of the war, the division remained in Czechoslovakia in the town of Mýto, east of Plzeň, until 6 June, after which it relocated to southwestern Hungary, where it was stationed in camps and manorial estates at Gyöngyöspuszta and Szentmihály 8 km (5 mi) south of Kadarkút. In Hungary, the division conducted combat training and served at border guard posts on the Hungary-Yugoslavia border. With its corps and army, the 252nd became part of the Central Group of Forces when the latter was formed on 10 June from units of the 1st and 2nd Ukrainian Fronts. In accordance with an order of the Central Group of Forces on 21 June, the 442nd Divisional Artillery Brigade was formed in the division as part of a reorganization of Red Army rifle divisions to increase organic artillery capability; it included the 787th Gun, the 826th Howitzer Artillery, and 670th Mortar Regiments. The 1012th Separate Anti-Aircraft Artillery Battalion and 583rd Separate Self-Propelled Artillery Battalion, the latter equipped with the SU-76s, were also formed as units under the direct control of the division headquarters.

Division artillery strength, 10 February 1946
Equipment	Authorized	Actual
82 mm mortar	24	99
120 mm mortar	26	38
37 mm anti-aircraft gun M1939	4	12
45 mm anti-tank gun M1942	8	36
57 mm anti-tank gun (ZiS-2)	16	4
76 mm regimental gun M1943	6	12
76 mm divisional gun (ZiS-3)	14	46
SU-76	16	16
122 mm howitzer M1938	14	20

In accordance with an order of the Central Group of Forces, the division was transported by rail to the Soviet Union via Kaposvár, Budapest, Sighet, Rostov, and Mineralnye Vody, with the rest of the 23rd Rifle Corps from 20 December, and by 15 February 1946 the division had fully arrived in the Stavropol Military District (merged into the North Caucasus Military District shortly afterwards). The corps was renumbered as the 60th upon arrival. By New Year's Day 1946, the units of the division were stationed as follows: division headquarters, the 924th and 928th Rifle Regiments, the 583rd Separate Self-Propelled Artillery Battalion, the 672nd Separate Communications Battalion, the 420th Separate Sapper Battalion, the 332nd Separate Motor Reconnaissance Company, the separate training battalion, and two auto transport companies at Nalchik, the 932nd Rifle Regiment at Dzaudzhikau, and the headquarters of the 442nd Divisional Artillery Brigade with its 787th Gun and 826th Howitzer Artillery, and 670th Mortar Regiments, the 310th Separate Anti-Tank (Tank Destroyer) Battalion with anti-tank guns, and the 1012th Separate Anti-Aircraft Artillery Battalion at Prokhladny.

Reduced to the 15th Separate Rifle Brigade on 1 July, its 924th, 928th, and 932nd Rifle Regiments became the 168th, 172nd, and 176th Separate Rifle Battalions, respectively, while the divisional artillery brigade was eliminated. The 787th Artillery Regiment, the SU-76-equipped 23rd Separate Self-Propelled Artillery Battery, the 332nd Separate Motor Reconnaissance Company, and communications, sapper, and training rifle companies rounded out the brigade. The brigade, with a total personnel strength of 2,010, had all of its units at Nalchik except for the 787th at Prokhladny. The brigade was disbanded in May 1947, and its personnel were used to reinforce other units of the district. Gorbachyov was sent to courses at the Military Academy of the General Staff.
