= List of air assault battalions of the Soviet Union =

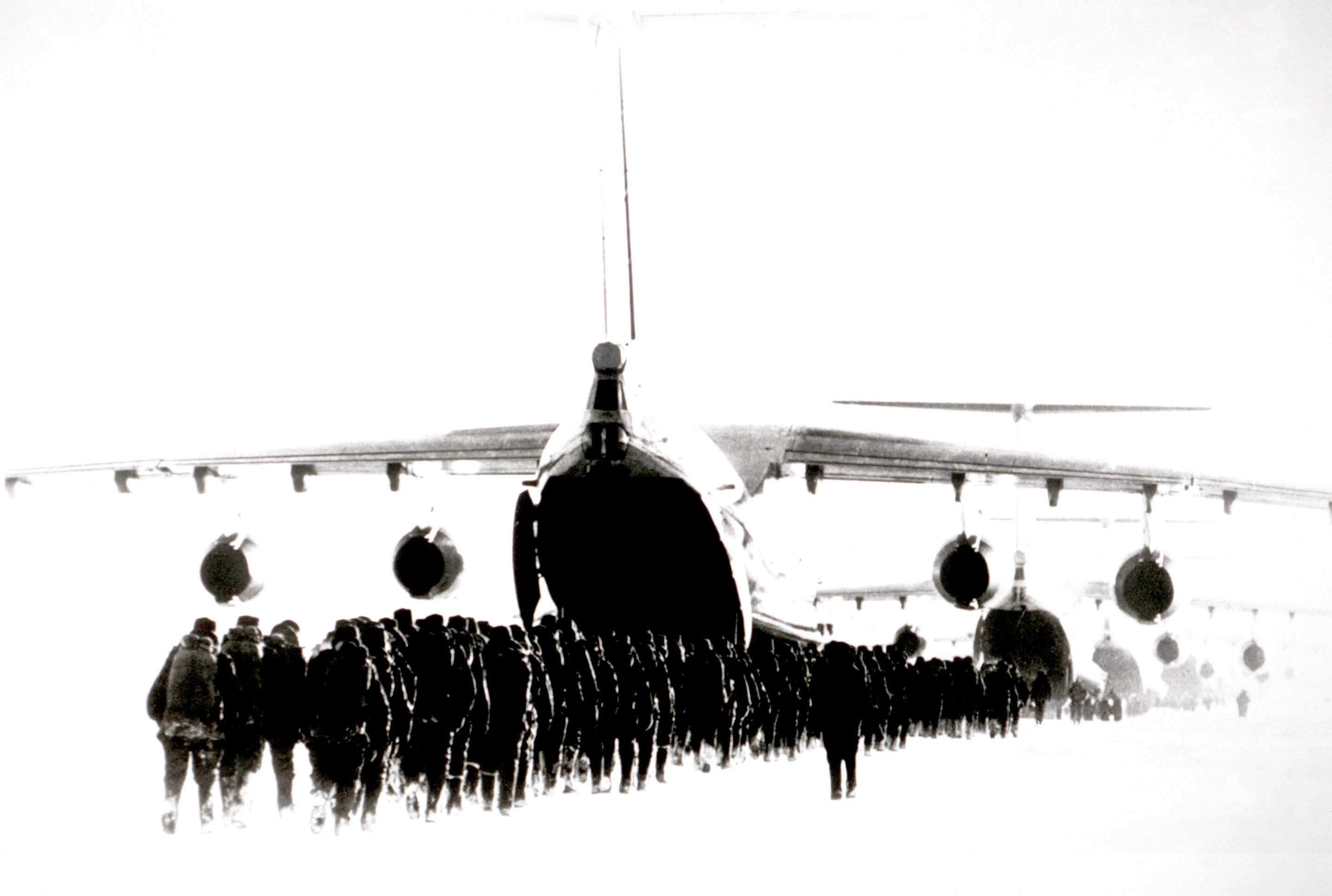
An Ilyushin Il-76 loading Soviet paratroopers.

At least 20 Separate Air Assault Battalions were formed in the Soviet Army between 1979 and 1981. These units provided airmobile capability to field armies, groups of forces and military districts. Five mobilization air assault battalions were also created, the first in 1981 and the remainder in 1987. Almost all of these units were disbanded between 1989 and 1991. The battalions of the first three separate air assault brigades to be formed (the 11th, 13th and 21st) were designated as separate air assault battalions. The 11th and 13th Brigades formed in 1968 and the 21st in 1972. The 617th, 618th and 619th Battalions were with the 11th Brigade, the 620th, 621st and 622nd were with the 13th, and the 802nd, 803rd and 804th were with the 21st Brigade. This article aims to provide a history of the independent air assault battalions not part of air assault brigades.

== Separate Air Assault Battalions ==
- 48th Air Assault Battalion – Activated January 1980 in Khyriv as the 39th Air Assault Brigade's 1st Airborne Battalion. On 31 January, it moved to Termez, without weapons or equipment and was redesignated as the 48th Air Assault Battalion. After spending a month reequipping it deployed over the Afghan border on 25 February 1980 and arrived in Kabul by 24 March 1980. It was subordinated to the 40th Army until 1 March, when it became part of the 66th Motor Rifle Brigade. From March onwards, the battalion fought in operations of the Soviet–Afghan War. It was absorbed by the brigade on 1 May at Jalalabad.
- 65th Air Assault Battalion – Activated November 1985 in Białogard with the Northern Group of Forces from the 126th Guards Reconnaissance Battalion. The battalion was enlarged between May and November 1986 to become the 83rd Air Assault Brigade.
- 899th Air Assault Battalion – Activated December 1979 from 1st Airborne Battalion (351st Guards Airborne Regiment, 105th Guards Airborne Division) in Burg with 3rd Red Banner Army. The battalion moved to Tambov in the Moscow Military District in March 1989. It was disbanded in February and March 1991, still at Tambov.
- 900th Air Assault Battalion – Activated December 1979 from 1st Airborne Battalion (351st Guards Airborne Regiment, 105th Guards Airborne Division) in Schönau, Leipzig with 8th Guards Army. The battalion transferred to Zaslonovo in the Belorussian Military District in March 1989. In October 1989, the battalion was transferred to the Internal Troops. It was disbanded in November 1989.
- 901st Air Assault Battalion – Activated October 1979 in Kirovabad with the Transcaucasian Military District. In November 1979, the battalion was moved to Oremov Laz, Czechoslovakia with the Central Group of Forces. In March 1989, it was sent to Aluksne in the Baltic Military District. The battalion moved to Sukhumi in May 1991, becoming part of the Transcaucasian Military District once again. In August 1992, it became part of the 7th Guards Airborne Division. During 1993, it fought in Abkhazia. The battalion moved to Kubinka with the division in October 1993. In February 1994, it became part of the 45th Spetsnaz Regiment as the 901st Spetsnaz Battalion and was disbanded in May 1998.
- 902nd Air Assault Battalion – Activated November 1979 in Chirchiq from the 3rd Airborne Battalion (351st Guards Airborne Regiment, 105th Guards Airborne Division). The battalion was moved to Kecskemét with the Southern Group of Forces in December 1979. It moved to Malaryta in the Belorussian Military District during April and May 1989. The battalion was disbanded in 1992.
- 903rd Air Assault Battalion – Activated 10 November 1979 in Brest from the 3rd Airborne Battalion (80th Guards Airborne Regiment, 104th Guards Airborne Division) with 28th Army. It moved to Grodno in 1986. The battalion was disbanded on 31 December 1989.
- 904th Air Assault Battalion – Activated 1982 in Volodymyr-Volynskyi with 13th Army, disbanded December 1989.
- 905th Air Assault Battalion – Activated November 1979 in Fergana, apparently from elements of the 345th Guards Airborne Regiment of the 105th Guards Airborne Division. The battalion moved to Bender soon after and became part of the 14th Guards Army. It was disbanded in December 1989.
- 906th Air Assault Battalion – Activated December 1979 in Durbachi with 36th Army. Moved to Khada Bulak in 1984 and to Mirny in 1986. It was disbanded in December 1989.
- 907th Air Assault Battalion – Activated December 1979 in Birobidzhan with 43rd Army Corps , disbanded December 1989.
- 908th Air Assault Battalion – Activated December 1979 in Konotop with 1st Guards Army. It moved to Honcharivske in 1984, becoming part of the 1st Guards Army, and was disbanded in December 1989.
- 1011th Air Assault Battalion – Activated December 1979 in Maryina Horka with the 5th Guards Tank Army, disbanded in December 1989.
- 1044th Air Assault Battalion – Activated 1 June 1980 in Forst Zinna from 1st and 8th Airborne Companies of the 35th Guards Air Assault Brigade. The battalion was part of the 1st Guards Tank Army. In November 1981, it moved to Neues Lager near Juterbog and transferred to Tauragė in the Baltic Military District during February and March 1989. In December 1989, it became part of the Baltic Fleet. The battalion transferred to the 107th Motor Rifle Division in June 1991 and was disbanded in October 1991.
- 1139th Air Assault Battalion – Activated November 1979 in Chernyakhovsk or Kaliningrad (sources differ) with 11th Guards Army, disbanded December 1989.
- 1145th Air Assault Battalion – Activated November 1979 in Sergeyevka, Primorsky Krai with 5th Red Banner Army, disbanded December 1989.
- 1151st Air Assault Battalion – Activated 1980 with 7th Tank Army in Polotsk, disbanded December 1989.
- 1156th Air Assault Battalion – Activated 1980 in Novohrad-Volynskyi with 8th Tank Army, disbanded December 1989.
- 1179th Air Assault Battalion – Activated 1980 in Petrozavodsk with 6th Army, disbanded December 1989.
- 1185th Air Assault Battalion – Activated January 1981 in Ravensbrück with 2nd Tank Army. The battalion moved to Võru in March 1989, becoming part of the Baltic Military District. It was disbanded in October 1991.
- 1635th Air Assault Battalion – With 15th Army at Khabarovsk-41 (Krasnaya Rechka) in the late 1980s.

== Separate Air Assault Battalions (Mobilization) ==
- 1154th Air Assault Battalion – Activated 1981 in Shelekhov with 29th Army, disbanded December 1989.
- 1603rd Air Assault Battalion – Activated December 1987 in Nadvirna with 38th Army, disbanded December 1989.
- 1604th Air Assault Battalion – Activated December 1987 in Sosnovy Bor (Ulan-Ude) with 29th Army, disbanded December 1989.
- 1605th Air Assault Battalion – Activated December 1987 in Spassk-Dalny with 5th Red Banner Army, disbanded December 1989.
- 1609th Air Assault Battalion – Activated December 1987 in Mandalgovi or Kyakhta (sources differ) with 39th Army, disbanded December 1989.
