= 43rd Army Corps (Soviet Union) =

137th Rifle Corps (1945–1955) 43rd Rifle Corps (II) (1955–1957) 43rd Army Corps (1957–1989)
- Active: 1945–1989
- Country: Soviet Union
- Branch: Soviet Army
- Type: Infantry
- Part of: Far Eastern Military District

The 43rd Army Corps (Military Unit Number 16460) was a corps of the Soviet Army from 1945 to 1989. The corps was first formed as the 137th Rifle Corps in late 1945 and became the 43rd Rifle Corps (Second Formation) in 1955. The corps was redesignated as the 43rd Army Corps in 1957 and was based in Petropavlovsk-Kamchatsky. In 1969, it moved to Birobidzhan as a result of the Sino-Soviet border conflict. The corps was disbanded in 1989 was a result of Soviet troop reductions at the end of the Cold War.

== History ==
The 137th Rifle Corps was formed on 5 December 1945 in Petropavlovsk-Kamchatsky, part of the Far Eastern Military District, from the Kamchatka Defense Region. It was commanded by Lieutenant General Alexey Gnechko until May 1950. Gnechko was a Hero of the Soviet Union and veteran of the Soviet invasion of Manchuria. The units of the corps were based in Kamchatka and the Northern Kuriles and included the 22nd Rifle Division, 101st Rifle Division and 255th Rifle Division. In 1948, the 101st Rifle Division became the 6th Machine Gun Artillery Division, which was disbanded in 1953. After the 1953 disbandment of the 14th Assault Army in Chukotka its 3rd and 8th Separate Rifle Brigades became part of the corps.

In April 1955, the corps became the 43rd Rifle Corps (Second Formation). In 1955 the 255th Rifle Division was renamed the 35th Rifle Division. As part of the Soviet Army reorganization, it became the 43rd Army Corps on 25 June 1957. At the time it included the 410th Separate Motor Rifle Regiment at Magadan and the 414th at Anadyr. During the reorganization, the 35th Rifle Division became the 125th Motor Rifle Division and was disbanded in 1958. The 22nd Rifle Division was converted into the 22nd Motor Rifle Division. In 1960, the corps included the 22nd Motor Rifle Division and the 414th Separate Motor Rifle Regiment. In May 1969, as a result of the Sino-Soviet border conflict, corps headquarters transferred to Birobidzhan. At the same time, the 272nd Motor Rifle Division at Babstovo became part of the corps. The 118th Motor Rifle Division was formed in 1970 as a mobilization division subordinated to the corps. In May 1970, the 3rd Fortified Area was activated as part of the corps at Leninsk. Between 1987 and 1989, the corps was commanded by future Soviet airborne commander Major General Nikolai Vasilyevich Kalinin. The 118th Motor Rifle Division was disbanded in 1987. In July 1989 the 272nd Motor Rifle Division became the 128th Machine Gun Artillery Division. Due to the Soviet troop reductions at the end of the Cold War, the corps disbanded on 10 October 1989. Its units were either disbanded or reassigned to the 35th Army.

== Commanders ==
The following officers commanded the corps.

- Lieutenant General Alexey Gnechko (5 December 1945 – May 1950)
- Lieutenant General Viktor Urbanovich (May 1950 – April 1953)
- Major General Yevgeny Korkuts (2 June 1953 – 13 October 1954)
- Major General Arakel Oganezov (13 October 1954 – 10 February 1956)
- Major General Arkhip Golubev (4 May 1956 – 31 October 1958)
- Major General Ivan Veremey (January 1959 – April 1961)
- Not known (1961–73)
- Major General Alexander Kovtunov (1973–77)
- Major General Nikolay Vasilevich Kalinin (1977–79)
- Not known (1979–85)
- Major General Yuriy Fyodorovich Shchepin (1985–87)
- Not known (1987–89)

== Composition ==
During the late 1980s the corps included the following units.

- 203rd Anti-Aircraft Rocket Brigade (Birobidzhan)
- 907th Separate Air Assault Battalion (Birobidzhan)
- 688th Separate Communications Battalion (Birobidzhan)
- Separate Radio Engineering Battalion PVO (Birobidzhan)
- Material Support Brigade (Birobidzhan)
- Repair and Replacement Base (Birobidzhan)
- 8th Separate Armored Train (Birobidzhan)
- 23rd Rocket Brigade (Sopka)
- Cannon Artillery Regiment (Babstovo)
- 272nd Motor Rifle Division (Babstovo)
- 118th Motor Rifle Division (Mobilization) (Birobidzhan)
- 3rd Fortified Region (Leninsk)
