= Viktor Urbanovich =

Belarusian Soviet Army lieutenant general (1898–1977)

Viktor Kazimirovich Urbanovich
- Born: 2 June 1898; Riga, Livonia Governorate, Russian Empire
- Died: 2 June 1977 (aged 79); Moscow, Soviet Union
- Burial place: Kuntsevo Cemetery
- Military career
- Allegiance: Russian Empire; Russian SFSR; Soviet Union
- Branch: Imperial Russian Army; Red Army (later Soviet Army)
- Service years: 1916–1917; 1918–1960
- Rank: Lieutenant general
- Commands: 257th Rifle Division; 252nd Rifle Division; 186th Rifle Division; 41st Rifle Corps; 137th Rifle Corps
- Conflicts: World War I; Russian Civil War; Polish–Soviet War; World War II
- Awards: Order of Lenin (2)

Viktor Kazimirovich Urbanovich (Russian: Виктор Казимирович Урбанович; 2 June [O.S. 21 May] 1898 – 2 June 1977) was a Belarusian Soviet Army lieutenant general.

Urbanovich worked as a machinist in Riga and was conscripted into the railway troops of the Imperial Russian Army during World War I, but was discharged after being gassed. He joined the Red Army during the Russian Civil War, resuming his service in the railway troops. Between the wars, Urbanovich rose to command positions in railway units of the OGPU Troops before holding staff positions in the NKVD Border Guards. After Operation Barbarossa began, he became commander of the 257th Rifle Division, but was relieved of command after it was surrounded on the Northwestern Front. Urbanovich briefly held regimental command and a staff position before taking command of the 252nd Rifle Division at the beginning of 1942. He led the 252nd and then the 186th Rifle Division in the Battles of Rzhev, and in mid-1943 was promoted to command the 41st Rifle Corps, which he led for the rest of the war in its westward advance. Continuing his command into the early postwar period, Urbanovich commanded the 137th Rifle Corps in the early 1950s and served as an advisor to the People's Liberation Army, retiring in 1960.

== Early life, World War I, and Russian Civil War ==
Urbanovich was born on 2 June [O.S. 21 May] 1898 in Riga. He worked as an apprentice machinist at the Fenikss railcar factory in Riga. After the factory was evacuated in May 1915 due to World War I, he became a machinist's assistant at the Main Workshops of the Riga-Oryol Railway. Urbanovich was mobilized for military service in December 1916 and sent to the 5th Operational Railway Regiment of the Northwestern Front as a private. During the retreat from Riga in August 1917, he was shell-shocked and gassed. After treatment in a hospital Urbanovich was discharged and placed at the disposal of the head of the steam locomotive depot of the Riga-Oryol Railway in Oryol. Working as a machinist in Oryol, he commanded a railway workers' druzhina (workers' militia) section there after the October Revolution.

During the Russian Civil War, in May 1918, Urbanovich joined the Red Army and was assigned to the 21st Roslavl Railway Defense Regiment. With the regiment, he served successively as an assistant platoon commander, platoon commander, assistant chief of the machine gun detachment, and chief of armored vehicles. Urbanovich participated in fighting against the Revolutionary Insurrectionary Army of Ukraine, the Ukrainian People's Army, and the Armed Forces of South Russia in Chernigov, Kherson, and Poltava Governorates.

He transferred to the 86th Separate Railway Defense Battalion in October 1919, serving successively as an assistant company commander and company commander. After fighting against the Armed Forces of South Russia and Polish troops at Chernigov, Kiev, Berdichev, and Mozyr, Urbanovich became temporary chief of the landing detachment of Armored Train No. 19 in May 1920. With the 14th Army of the Southwestern Front, he served with the armored train in fighting near Kazatin and Uman during the Polish–Soviet War.

Urbanovich entered the 27th Oryol Infantry and Machine Gun Commanders' Courses in August and after completing them in November was appointed a platoon instructor in the 2nd Reserve Machine Gun Battalion. From January 1921 he served first as a machine gun platoon commander, then as assistant chief and chief of the machine gun detachment of the 2nd Regiment of the Cheka. With the Cheka unit, he fought in the suppression of the Tambov Rebellion, receiving the Order of the Red Banner in 1923 for his actions.

== Interwar period ==
Urbanovich transferred to the 25th Separate Road Transport Battalion of the Cheka in November 1921, temporarily serving as a company commander. The battalion was reorganized as the 5th Volga Railway Regiment in June 1922, and as a result he became a platoon commander and then a battalion adjutant. He transferred to the 5th Nizhegorod Battalion of the OGPU Troops in January 1923, serving as a platoon commander, and from June of that year temporarily served as assistant commander of the battalion for personnel. Released for study in May 1924, he became a student at the Frunze Military Academy in September after passing the entrance exam.

After his graduation from the academy, Urbanovich became an instructor and chief of the main faculty of the Higher Border School of the OGPU in July 1928. From November 1931 he served as temporary chief of the training department of the 1st Voroshilov Border Guard and OGPU Troops School, becoming chief of staff of the school in December of that year. Urbanovich became commander and military commissar of the 9th Railway Brigade of the plenipotentiary representative of the Moscow OGPU District in October 1932, soon transferring to the 4th Railway Brigade in January 1933 to hold the same position.

From July of that year he held several positions at the Central Asia Border Guard and OGPU Troops Headquarters, being chief of the third section of the second department, chief of the first section of the combat training department, and chief of the combat training and armament department. After temporarily serving as the chief of the combat training and armament department of the Turkmen SSR Border Guard and OGPU Troops Headquarters from November 1934 he transferred to the Red Banner Far East NKVD Border Troops District in May 1935. With the latter, Urbanovich served as chief of the combat training and armament department and then as chief of staff of the district from February 1937. From January 1940, as a colonel, he temporarily served as chief of the first staff department of the NKVD Troops for railway facilities protection. Urbanovich became deputy chief of the combat training department of the organizational headquarters of the Main Directorate of NKVD Border Troops in April.

== World War II ==
After the beginning of Operation Barbarossa, the German invasion of the Soviet Union, Urbanovich was appointed commander of the 257th Rifle Division, then forming from NKVD Troops at Tula, in late June. He was soon promoted to major general. After the division finished its formation, it was sent to Bologoye, joining the 34th Army of the Reserve Front (transferred to the Northwestern Front on 6 August) on arrival and participated in the Staraya Russa counterattack. The army was forced to retreat to the Lovat River by the counterattack of German reserves. During the withdrawal, the division was part of the rearguard and kept open the retreat of the main forces of the army. The division was surrounded near Lake Ilmen and after it broke out Urbanovich was relieved of command in the second half of September for "unsuccessful actions." He was demoted to command the 295th Rifle Regiment of the 183rd Rifle Division of the 27th Army of the Northwestern Front.

After being seconded to the Main Personnel Directorate of the People's Commissariat of Defense a month later, Urbanovich was appointed chief of the operational department of the 29th Army in November, participating in the Kalinin Defensive and Offensive Operations as part of the Kalinin Front. He took command of the 252nd Rifle Division of the 29th Army on 5 January 1942, leading it in the Battles of Rzhev. The division transferred to the 39th Army on 20 January and attacked towards the Osuga railway station south of Rzhev during the Rzhev–Vyazma Offensive, tasked with reaching the Rzhev-Vyazma railway from the west. During the offensive, the division captured the strongpoints of Monchalovo and Popovka, going on the defensive fifteen kilometers southwest of Osuga station. It remained there for four months in the Rzhev salient in semi-encirclement, supplied only by a small corridor in the Nesterovo area. Between 2 and 5 July German forces cut off the 39th Army in Operation Seydlitz with converging attacks on Nesterovo from Bely and Karskaya. Under these conditions, Urbanovich managed to withdrawal the division from the encirclement, showing "firmness in command" and "personal courage", according to evaluation by superiors.

Urbanovich was appointed commander of the 186th Rifle Division of the front's 22nd Army on 30 August. The 186th defended positions on the north bank of the Molodoy Tud, and was transferred to the 39th Army on 5 October. As part of the latter, during a November local offensive in a secondary direction, Urbanovich commanded an operational group that included the division and the 100th Rifle Brigade. He was awarded the Order of the Red Banner on 8 April 1943 for the division's capture of Olenino during the Rzhev–Vyazma Offensive in late February and early March of that year. The 186th was withdrawn to front reserve on 7 March and then to the Reserve of the Supreme High Command, being relocated to Plavsk, joining the 3rd Army of the Bryansk Front in May.

Urbanovich was promoted to command the 41st Rifle Corps of the 3rd Army on 5 July, leading the corps for the rest of the war; he was promoted to lieutenant general on 2 November 1944. 3rd Army commander Alexander Gorbatov repeatedly evaluated him as a "skilled organizer and battlefield leader" during this period. He led the corps in Operation Kutuzov, the Bryansk Offensive, the Rogachev-Zhlobin Offensive, the Bobruysk Offensive, the Minsk Offensive, the Belostok Offensive, the Mlawa-Elbing Offensive, and the East Prussian Offensive as part of the Bryansk Front, the Central Front, and the 1st, 2nd, and 3rd Belorussian Fronts. During this period, the corps participated in the capture of Oryol, Kostyukovichi, Rogachev, Bobruysk, Novogrudok, Belostok, Ostrolenka, Willenberg, and Heiligenbeil. It went on to fight in the Berlin Offensive in April 1945, entering the battle after the breakthrough of the German defensive line and participating in the reduction of the Halbe pocket. For his leadership in the latter, Urbanovich received the Order of Kutuzov, 1st class, on 29 May.

== Postwar ==
After the end of the war, Urbanovich continued to command the 41st Rifle Corps in the Minsk (Belorussian from March 1946) Military District. He entered the Higher Academic Courses at the Voroshilov Higher Military Academy in May 1949, and upon graduation a year leader became commander of the 137th Rifle Corps of the Far Eastern Military District. Sent to the People's Republic of China in April 1953 as the senior military adviser to the commander of a People's Liberation Army military district, he became senior military adviser to the PLA deputy chief of the general staff for combat training. Upon his return to the Soviet Union in July 1957, Urbanovich was seconded to the General Staff for research work, and transferred to the reserve on 3 October 1960. He died in Moscow on 2 June 1977 and was buried at the Kuntsevo Cemetery.

== Awards and honors ==
- Two Order of Lenin
- Four Order of the Red Banner
- Order of Kutuzov 1st class
- Order of Suvorov 2nd class
- Order of Bogdan Khmelnitsky 2nd class
- Order of the Patriotic War 1st class
