= Nikolai Kalinin =

Soviet general (1937–2008)

Nikolai Vasilyevich Kalinin
- Николай Васильевич Калинин
- Born: 10 March 1937; Malye Kurashki village, Lyskovsky District, Gorky Oblast, Soviet Union
- Died: 7 March 2008 (aged 70); Moscow, Russia
- Burial place: Troyekurovskoye Cemetery
- Military career
- Allegiance: Soviet Union (1955–1991); Russia (1992–1993)
- Branch: Soviet Army
- Service years: 1955–1993
- Rank: Colonel general
- Commands: 7th Guards Airborne Division; 43rd Army Corps; 15th Army; Siberian Military District; Soviet airborne; Moscow Military District
- Awards: Order of the October Revolution; Order of the Red Banner

Nikolai Vasilyevich Kalinin (Russian: Николай Васильевич Калинин; 10 March 1937 – 7 March 2008) was a Red Army Colonel general. He commanded the Soviet airborne from August 1987 to January 1989, after which Kalinin became the commander of the Moscow Military District. In August 1991, he supported the coup d'état attempt and was relieved of command after the coup failed. After retiring in 1993, Kalinin died on 7 March 2008.

== Early life ==
Kalinin was born on 10 March 1937 in Malye Kurashki village in the Lyskovsky District of Gorky Oblast.

== Military service ==
In 1958, Kalinin graduated from the Leningrad Infantry School. He served as a platoon and company commander. In 1968, he graduated from the Frunze Military Academy. From 1968 to 1969, Kalinin was a battalion commander in the 111th Guards Airborne Regiment. In 1970, he became chief of staff of the regiment, and its commander in 1972. In the same year, he transferred to become deputy commander of the 105th Guards Airborne Division. Kalinin commanded the 7th Guards Airborne Division between 1973 and 1975. In 1977, he graduated from the Military Academy of the General Staff, after which Kalinin became a corps commander. In 1979, he became an army commander. From 1983 to 1985, he was the deputy commander of the Carpathian Military District. Kalin was appointed deputy commander of the Group of Soviet Forces in Germany in 1985. In 1986, he was transferred to lead the Siberian Military District. In August 1987, he became the commander of the Soviet airborne. In January 1989, Kalinin became the commander of the Moscow Military District. After assisting the State Committee on the State of Emergency during the August Coup in 1991, Kalinin was replaced by Vladimir Mikhailovich Toporov. On 20 August, Kalinin declared a curfew in Moscow.

== Later life ==
Kalinin died on 7 March 2008 at the age of 70, three days before his 71st birthday.

Military offices
Preceded by Oleg Kuleshov	Commander of the 7th Guards Airborne Division; 1973–1975	Succeeded by Vladimir Krayev
Preceded by Vladimir Vostrov	Commander of the Siberian Military District; 1986–1987	Succeeded by Boris Pyankov
Preceded by Konstantin Kochetov	Commander of the Moscow Military District; 1989–1991	Succeeded by Vladimir Toporov
Preceded by Dmitri Sukhorukov	Commander of the Soviet Airborne Forces; 1987–1989	Succeeded by Vladislav Achalov
