= 256th Rifle Division =

256th Rifle Division (June 29, 1941 – October 22, 1945)
- Active: 1941–1945
- Country: Soviet Union
- Branch: Red Army
- Type: Infantry
- Size: Division
- Engagements: Battle of Smolensk (1941); Leningrad strategic defensive; Battle of Moscow; Battles of Rzhev; Sinyavino offensive (1942); Operation Iskra; Mga offensive; Leningrad–Novgorod offensive; Battle of Narva (1944); Baltic offensive; Riga offensive (1944); Courland Pocket
- Decorations: Order of the Red Banner
- Battle honours: Narva

Commanders
- Notable commanders: Maj. Gen. Stepan Aleksandrovich Ivanov; Maj. Gen. Sergei Georgievich Goryachev; Lt. Col. Ivan Kuzmich Eliseev; Col. Aleksei Pavlovich Baraboshkin; Maj. Gen. Fyodor Kuzmich Fetisov; Maj. Gen. Anatolii Gavrilovich Koziev

The 256th Rifle Division was the last of a group of 10 regular rifle divisions formed from cadres of NKVD border and internal troops as standard Red Army rifle divisions, very shortly after the German invasion, in the Moscow Military District. It was largely based on what would become the shtat (table of organization and equipment) of July 29, 1941, with several variations. It was initially assigned to 29th Army in Western Front but was soon reassigned to 22nd Army in the same Front. It narrowly escaped being encircled and destroyed in late August, after which it retreated eastward as part of 27th Army before returning to the 22nd. In October the division, with one regiment detached, played a key role in the defense of Kalinin, during which it was transferred to 30th Army in the new Kalinin Front. During the Soviet winter counteroffensive the 256th came under command of 39th Army, which was attempting to trap the German forces holding Rzhev. This proved unsuccessful, and in July 1942 the 39th was itself encircled, forcing it to break out at the cost of heavy casualties. The division now moved to the north for rebuilding. It was then assigned to the Volkhov Front, and participated in the many battles to clear the German forces blockading Leningrad, culminating in Operation Iskra in January 1943, for which it was awarded the Order of the Red Banner. During the rest of the year the 256th fought in several more offensives to widen the land corridor to the city, but only made marginal gains. Finally, in January 1944, it took part in the Leningrad–Novgorod Offensive, advancing decisively to the west. It was encircled by a German counterattack in early February, but held out due to air supply and the assistance of partisan forces. After being relieved by 59th Army the division, and its 8th Army, were transferred to Leningrad Front and advanced on the Estonian city of Narva, which was already under attack by the Front. The fighting there went on for months until finally the city was taken in late July and the 256th was awarded its name as an honorific. Following this victory it advanced through Estonia and into Latvia as part of the 42nd Army in 2nd Baltic Front. During late 1944 and well into 1945 it was part of the forces blockading the German units trapped in the Courland Pocket. Shortly before the German surrender it returned to 22nd Army, which was being moved to the Reserve of the Supreme High Command, and it travelled south to the Odesa Military District. It was there until October when it was disbanded.

== Formation ==
The 256th Rifle Division began forming within days of the start of the German invasion on June 29, 1941, at Sofrino, in the Moscow Military District. This was based on an NKVD order of that date:

In accordance with a decision of the USSR's government, the NKVD of the USSR is charged with forming fifteen rifle divisions [10 regular and 5 mountain].
1. Lieutenant General I. I. Maslennikov is entrusted with the task of forming fifteen rifle divisions of NKVD forces...
3. Begin forming and deploying the [following] divisions immediately: 243rd Rifle Division, 244th Rifle Division, 246th Rifle Division, 247th Rifle Division, 249th Rifle Division, 250th Rifle Division, 251st Rifle Division, 252nd Rifle Division, 254th Rifle Division, 256th Rifle Division...
4. To form the divisions designated above, assign 1,000 soldiers and non-commissioned officers and 500 command cadre from the NKVD's cadre to each division. Request the Red Army General Staff to provide the remainder of personnel by calling up all categories of soldiers from the reserves.
5. Complete concentrating the NKVD cadre at the formation regions by 17 July 1941...

Although the initial order for its formation came from the NKVD, when it left for the front in early July it was completely under Red Army administration. Its order of battle was as follows:

- 930th Rifle Regiment
- 934th Rifle Regiment
- 937th Rifle Regiment
- 792nd Artillery Regiment (later 531st Light Artillery Regiment)
- 312th Antitank Battalion
- 334th Reconnaissance Company
- 422nd Sapper Battalion
- 674th Signal Battalion (later 225th Signal Company)
- 272nd Medical/Sanitation Battalion
- 252nd Chemical Defense (Anti-gas) Company
- 224th Auto Transport Company (later 475th)
- 301st Field Bakery
- 244th Divisional Veterinary Hospital
- 880th Field Postal Station
- 612th Field Office of the State Bank

Maj. Gen. Stepan Aleksandrovich Ivanov, an NKVD officer, was not appointed to command until July 7; he had previously commanded the 2nd NKVD Railway Security Division. By July 10 the division was under the Red Army's control and on the 15th it was assigned to 29th Army in Western Front.

Judging from reports on other NKVD-based divisions, the 256th was far from complete when it entered combat. The commander of the 30th Army, Maj. Gen. V. A. Khomenko, reported on August 5 regarding his 250th and 251st Divisions that they had been required to move up to 350 km on foot to their concentration areas and "were taken from their assembly points in the very midst of assembly, and, incomplete, they did not approach being 'knocked together' and went into battle unprepared for combat." In addition, the 251st had only about 400 NKVD cadre soldiers.

== Battle of Smolensk ==
On July 15, the lead elements of 2nd Panzer Group's 29th Motorized Division reached the southern part of Smolensk. Over the following days German pressure mounted against the three armies of Western Front, commanded by Marshal S. K. Timoshenko, which were almost entirely encircled in that region. On July 19 the commander of Reserve Front, Lt. Gen. I. A. Bogdanov, was alerted by the STAVKA to begin preparing an offensive operation with his 29th, 30th and 28th Armies to rescue Timoshenko's force. The 29th, commanded by General Maslennikov, was to advance from the Toropets region toward Velikiye Luki with its 243rd, 256th and 252nd Divisions.

At 2125 hours on July 20, on behalf of the STAVKA, Army Gen. G. K. Zhukov sent a directive to Timoshenko, who was now acting as commander of the Western Direction. Four reserve armies, including the 29th (now designated as "Group Maslennikov"), were to launch attacks toward Dukhovshchina and Smolensk along converging axes. Maslennikov was to attack southward from the Staro-Toropa region toward Demidov, reach Chikhachi and Lake Zhizhitskoye at Artemovo Station line by day's end on July 23, protect the Toropets axis, and dispatch a detachment of up to one battalion to protect the Group's flank in the Knyazhovo region. In a further report to the STAVKA at 0800 on July 26 Group Maslennikov was reported as having completed concentrating along the Chikhachi–Lake Zhizhitskoye line, with the 256th in the Chikhachi, Nazimovo Station, and Selishche region, 12 km south to 23 km west of Toropets. Early the next day Timoshenko reported to Stalin that the offensive had "developed at a slower than desired tempo during the last two days", and stated that Maslennikov had dispatched two divisions to attack the German Yartsevo–Dukhovshchina grouping while also attacking toward Ilyino. However, by July 31 it was clear that this first major counteroffensive in the Smolensk region had failed, although Army Group Center had to commit its last reserves. Before the end of the month the division had been transferred to 22nd Army, still in Western Front.

=== Fighting near Velikiye Luki ===
22nd Army had retaken Velikiye Luki on July 21. This overlooked victory was the first large city liberated by the Red Army. Following this the Army commander, Lt. Gen. F. A. Ershakov, attempted to create a new defense line along the Lovat River although his troops had taken heavy losses and he was in need of reinforcements. In a report dated at 2000 hours on August 3, Timoshenko stated that the 256th had one rifle regiment fighting with a German division in the Ploshosh region, with another regiment moving to assist, while the third regiment held its previous positions. At this time it was part of the 62nd Rifle Corps. Over the following days the remnants of the 16th and 20th Armies managed to withdraw eastwards from the Smolensk pocket, and at 2000 on August 7 Western Front issued another summary, in which it stated that the division was attacking toward Volok.

=== Staraya Russa Counterstroke ===
The STAVKA issued orders on August 9 and 10 to the Northwestern Front to orchestrate a counterstroke aimed at destroying German forces in the Soltsy, Staraya Russa, and Dno regions with the help of recently arrived reinforcements. Lt. Gen. N. F. Vatutin, the chief of staff of Northwestern Front, put forward a plan for a massive offensive south of Leningrad, but the STAVKA dialled this back with a more modest plan dictated at 2030 hours on August 9. Among other provisions the plan stated:

7. The 27th Army, reinforced by the 256th Rifle Division and the 54th Cavalry Division, will capture the Kholm region and dig in along the Lake Polisto and Podberezy line.

Despite careful preparations, Vatutin's offensive achieved only fleeting success. 27th Army attacked early on August 12. 16th Army's II Army Corps occupied all-round defenses at Kholm that stymied 27th Army's advance. In this attack and the subsequent withdrawal to the Valdai Hills the Army lost up to 30 percent of its strength.

On August 20 the commander of Army Group Center, Field Marshal F. von Bock, began regrouping his 19th and 20th Panzer Divisions, along with four infantry divisions, to launch a counterstrike against 22nd Army under command of XXXX Motorized Corps. This offensive began on August 22 and took Timoshenko, who was preparing a strike of his own, by considerable surprise. The panzers overran much of the 256th's former 62nd Corps and the Army was soon largely encircled and destroyed. With this large gap torn in the front the 27th Army had no choice but to fall back to the east.

On September 5 General Ivanov was transferred to command of the 257th Rifle Division, which he held until November when he was moved again to lead the 240th Rifle Division. He was removed from this command at the end of April 1942, and never held another front-line command until he retired in October 1945. Maj. Gen. Sergei Georgievich Goryachev took over the 256th. He had previously led the 50th, 5th and 23rd Rifle Divisions and had been most recently in command of a Fortified Region in the Valdai Hills.

Following their victory over 22nd Army, the two panzer divisions disappeared from the front lines by the first week of September. Timoshenko was so concerned about this potential threat he had his chief of staff, Lt. Gen. V. D. Sokolovskii, prepare a report which was sent to the STAVKA in the afternoon of September 10 which stated, in part:

There are four main groupings of enemy opposing the front. The first enemy grouping, which is operating at the boundary between 27th and 22nd Armies, consists of up to three divisions, one of which is pressing 256th RD back toward Peno.

On the same day, 22nd Army was directed to create an Army reserve in the Peno region.

=== Operation Typhoon ===
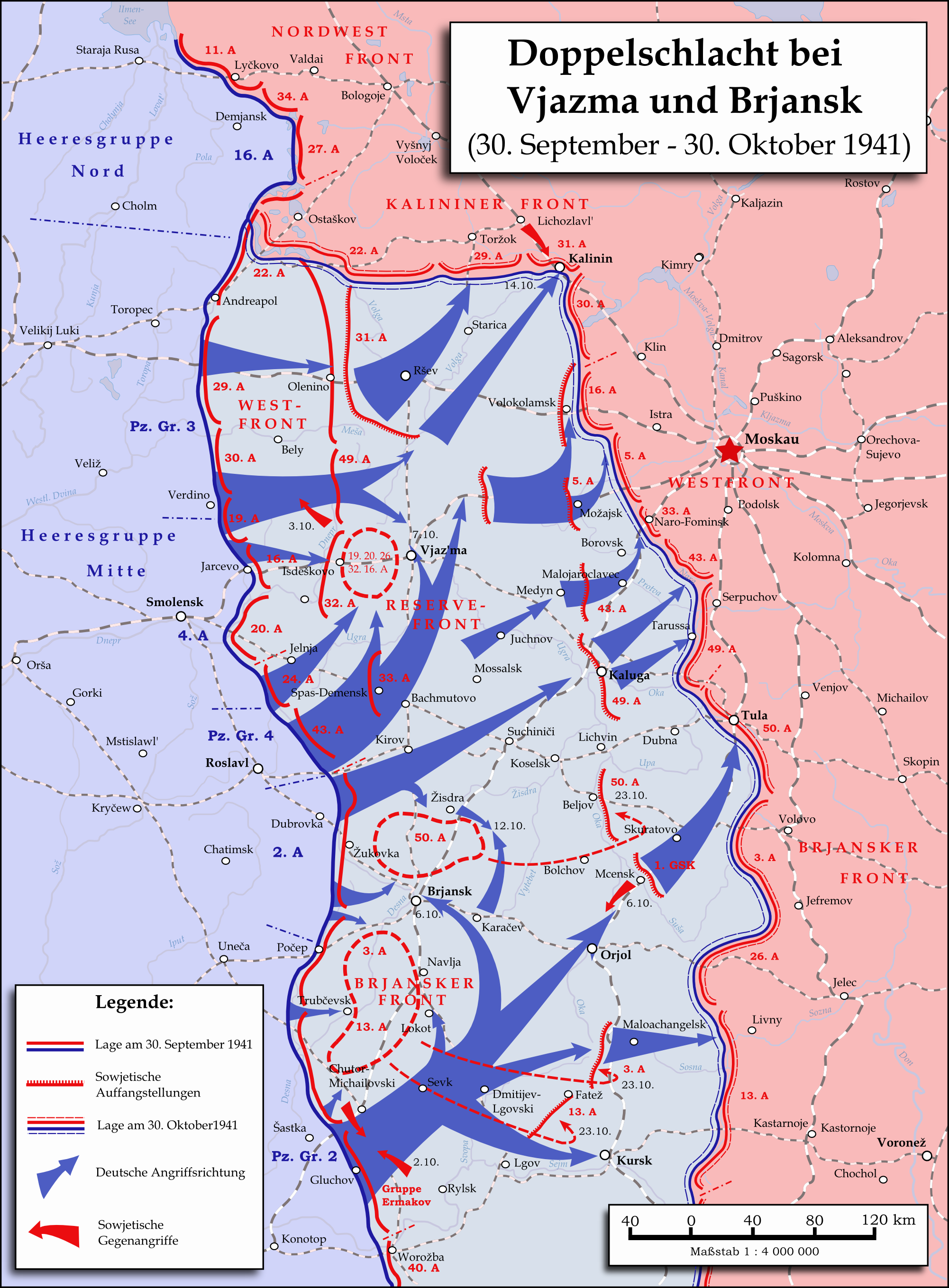
Operation Typhoon. Note positions of 22nd Army in the north.

By the start of October the division had returned to 22nd Army. The next day Army Group Center launched its part of Operation Typhoon, which was intended to be the final drive on Moscow. The main thrust of 3rd Panzer Group struck the boundary between 19th and 30th Armies and within days had penetrated to the north of Vyazma. 22nd Army, on the far right (north) flank of Western Front, escaped these initial blows. By October 9 the 256th, 133rd, 174th and 186th Rifle Divisions were withdrawing to the east, covered by rearguards, continuing to arrive at the previously prepared Ostashkov–Selizharovo–Kamenitsa–Plekhanovo line. There was no precise information about their location; as soon as the movement of troops or headquarters began, communications became disrupted. During the day, German activity was limited to reconnaissance probes.

== Battle of Kalinin ==
In an effort to cobble together a force that could keep the Germans out of Moscow, at 0200 hours on October 10 the STAVKA ordered seven rifle divisions pulled out of Western Front's right wing, including the 256th. As an indication of the urgency, the division was to move by truck. However, the 930th Rifle Regiment was left behind as a reserve for 22nd Army; this regiment eventually came under operational control of the 178th Rifle Division. On October 12 the STAVKA further ordered Zhukov to retain five divisions, including the 256th which was still on the move, for the defense of the Kalinin region. These would form the basis for a rebuilt 30th Army. On the night of October 13 the bulk of the division (less the 930th) arrived in Kalinin. The rifle regiments averaged 700 personnel each and the 792nd Artillery Regiment, lacking howitzers, had been redesignated as the 531st Light Artillery Regiment. The 934th Regiment was deployed on the north bank of the Volga, west of the city, where it forced a German group out of Cherkasovo, while the 937th took up positions in Kalinin itself as a reserve for 30th Army. The division was aided by the fact General Goryachev had grown up here and knew the area well.

German units began their assault on Kalinin along both banks of the Volga at 1030 hours on October 14, led by light units of XXXXI Motorized Corps' 1st Panzer Division. These were soon reinforced by several tank companies, the flame tank battalion (Panzer II Flamm), several engineer companies, and all of the division's three artillery battalions. The initial assault, attacking from west to northeast, ran into trouble at the railroad underpass in northwestern Kalinin, where Red Army troops knocked out three tanks. Subsequently, the German motorcycle troops were forced to work their way around to the southeast, penetrating the city from there. The 937th Regiment fiercely defended the northern part of the city, forcing the Germans to fight building by building. They made good use of their Flamm tanks, and the assault engineers of 37th Engineer Battalion, but were hampered by the limited amount of infantry available. Although they were in the city center by 1230 hours, the fight continued all day. 5th Rifle Division was forced back to the east; its artillery and support units retreated over the Gorbatov Bridge while two of its rifle regiments slipped out of the city between the railroad line and the river.

The 937th covered this retreat as 1st Panzer battled its way to the bridge. Maj. Dr. J. Eckinger's forward detachment, based on his 1st Battalion of the 113th Motorized Infantry Regiment, in armored halftracks, signalled at 1800 that it had the bridge "in hand". It was facing the 937th and militia of the 85th NKVD Regiment defending a canal line and a stadium with the help of several batteries of artillery. The commander of Eckinger's 3rd Company, thinking he had a clear run to the 250m-long bridge, ran into very heavy fire and was forced to deploy a smokescreen to reach the stadium. At this point the defenders were forced back across the bridge and then across the Tvertsa River into the northeast quarter of the city, establishing fortified positions in a brewery, several hospitals, and along the embankment of the Tvertsa. The bridge had been rigged for demolition but either the wires had been cut by artillery fire or in the confusion no one set them off. A platoon of German riflemen in halftracks managed to establish a bridgehead on the north bank. Meanwhile, the 934th Regiment and the 16th NKVD Regiment were defending the northwestern suburbs against pressure from German forces already on the north side of the river at the railroad bridge and the ford at Cherkasovo. The division would not be reunited until after the battle.

=== The Torzhok Road ===
At the end of the day the XXXXI Corps that if other units could be brought up from the rear the 1st Panzer would be prepared to attack northwestward toward Torzhok. The next morning Army Group Center announced the final liquidation of the Vyazma pocket. The 8th Tank Brigade, commanded by Col. P. A. Rotmistrov, was force-marching toward Torzhok to intercept the expected German advance. His liaison officers found the 934th Regiment deployed in the Malitsa region between the rail line and the Torzhok highway, with the 16th NKVD holding to its right. These units had been engaging elements of the 900th Lehr Brigade, which were now fighting to control the junction of the rail line and the Torzhok road just north of Doroshika Station.

General Vatutin, still chief of staff of Northwestern Front, was coordinating operations in the region. He had ordered Rotmistrov to take charge of any Soviet forces he found northwest of Kalinin and the 934th and 16th NKVD duly came under his command. He deployed his 2nd Tank Battalion, equipped with T-40s, behind the 934th. Meanwhile, the 937th Regiment continued to resist strongly behind the Tvertsa; even though 1st Panzer brought tanks forward they were repulsed trying to cross the Tvertsa Bridge. At 1030 hours, XXXXI Corps issued an order to its divisions to dismount the majority of their forces and fight on foot due to heavy losses in vehicles and the fuel situation. The 6th Panzer Division, as one example, was effectively immobilized due to the shortage of fuel, and this would be a constant issue in the upcoming fighting.

On the morning of October 16 Army Group Center declared the defeat of the Soviet forces facing Panzer Group 2 and 9th Army and gave orders for the panzers to take Torzhok en route to Vyshny Volochyok in order to join up with the south flank of 16th Army. This was in accordance with a grandiose plan to encircle all the Red Army forces in the western Valdai Hills. At some time between 0800 and noon (according records of both sides)the 1st Panzer and 900th Lehr struck out along the Torzhok road. 3rd Panzer Group recorded that by 1600 1st Panzer had taken Kalikino, and Soviet accounts state that Rotmistrov's defenses gave way under the attack. Advancing from the Doroshika Station area the attackers struck at the 934th Regiment, 46th Motorcycle Regiment, and 18 tanks of the 8th Brigade (one KV-1, five T-34s, six T-40s and six T-38s). By the end of the day the German grouping had captured the villages of Malitsa, Poddubki and Mednoye, the latter being 22 km northwest of Kalinin with a bridge over the Tvertsa.

Meanwhile, in Kalinin itself, 6th Panzer's forward detachment (6th Motorcycle Battalion due to the fuel situation, reinforced with a battery of Sd.Kfz. 11/1 halftracks) finally arrived in the city. The halftracks were from 36th Motorized Division, whose motorcycle battalion had earlier attempted to cross the Tvertsa on rafts, only to be driven off by direct artillery fire from 937th Regiment. 36th Motorized had been tasked with clearing the remainder of Kalinin, with the help of 6th Panzer, which came down to destroying the 937th or forcing it to retreat.

While 3rd Panzer Group was determined to continue the advance on Torzhok on October 17, further Soviet forces were converging on the area. During the morning the fresh 21st Tank Brigade raided into the German rear, destroying transport, guns, tanks and personnel. Despite this the 1st Panzer and 900th Lehr made steady progress along the Torzhok road during the morning and secured the bridge over the narrow Logovezh River at Marino by evening, 42 km from Kalinin. At the same time the 937th Regiment came under concerted attack from elements of 36th Motorized and 6th Panzer's motorcyclists, supported by Flamm tanks and direct fire artillery. This time they went directly for the Tvertsa bridge and once again the demolition charges failed. By the end of the day only a few buildings in the city remained under Red Army control and these pockets were cut off as German forces reached the city limits. Even though the 937th repelled German attempts to probe northward up the road to Bezhetsk, 134 km distant, the regiment had been badly damaged and its morale was sinking.

In the event, this day marked the end of the German advance as the STAVKA gathered forces to conduct a general counterstroke. Vatutin's Operational Group, which included the 934th Regiment, totalled about 20,000 personnel, 200 guns and mortars and 20 operational tanks. The German forces deployed along the Torzhok road amounted to roughly 5,000 men, many of which were in armored halftracks, 40-50 tanks, and three artillery battalions which were almost without ammunition. Vatutin ordered the attack to begin at dawn on October 18. Among other moves the 133rd Division was to employ its 418th Rifle Regiment to seize the Kalikino region, in cooperation with what remained of the 934th and the 46th Motorcycle Regiment. This would cut off the advanced German forces from Kalinin.

In order to rationalize the command structure in the Kalinin area (as an example, the three rifle regiments of the 256th were currently under three different commands), overnight the STAVKA created the new Kalinin Front, to be led by Col. Gen. I. S. Konev, presently serving as deputy commander of Western Front. The Front's mission was to clear the Kalinin region and cooperate with Northwestern and Western Front in defeating the German threat to Moscow from the north. The 256th came under command of the Front, although the 930th Regiment was still detached, supporting the 178th Division northeast of Rzhev in Western Front. None of this had any immediate practical effect.

The attack by 418th Regiment took the German forces in Novoye and Staroye Kalikino by surprise and it soon controlled the villages. A column of German troops in trucks and motorcycles coming from Kalinin was ambushed and the survivors forced back, summoning reinforcements. These duly arrived but were unable to reopen the road in fighting that continued through the day. The evening report by XXXXI Corps noted that it could not continue the attack toward Torzhok due to ammunition and fuel shortages. At about noon a detachment of 36th Motorized, reinforced by a few tanks, made another probe up the Bzhetsk road but the 937th Regiment repulsed this with well-placed artillery fire. (The 531st Artillery as well as the divisional headquarters were with this regiment.)

At 0800 hours on October 19 the headquarters of XXXXI Corps declared the situation of 1st Panzer to be "critical" and noted that Soviet forces were still holding firm in Kalikino, and 900th Lehr would be forced to abandon its bridgehead at Marino, which was coming under steady pressure from the 183rd Rifle Division and the Separate Motorized Rifle Brigade. Back at the city, Kalinin Front reported that:

256th Rifle Division on 19.10.41 waged battle against the enemy, which was occupying the northeastern parts of Kalinin. During the day's battle the division advanced 4-500 metres. The enemy with up to a battalion of infantry, six to eight heavy machineguns, three mortar batteries and two batteries of light artillery rendered persistent resistance to the offensive by 2nd and 3rd Battalions of 937th Rifle Regiment. Losses - 47 wounded, killed and missing - no report. 1st Battalion of 937th Rifle Regiment was operating directly under the command of 5th Rifle Division.

German records do not mention any such action, merely 6th Panzer's motorcyclists turning back a company-sized attack at 1030 hours.

In the early hours of October 20 the 900th Lehr, already pulling back from Marino, was encircled. The brigade was ordered to abandon Mednoye and fight its way out between the Torzhok road and the Tma River with only minimal fuel and ammunition available. The tanks of 1st Panzer that had been attached to Lehr managed to fight through the 119th Rifle Division and link up with Battlegroup von Heydebrand, the main strike force of 1st Panzer, near Cherkasovo. The battlegroup reported that due to heavy losses it was no longer able to attack and would require rest before it could break out. This retreat on the Torzhok road would mark the first permanent liberation of territory by Soviet forces since to start of the invasion.

==== Battle for the City ====
On the same day the remnants of the 934th Regiment marched around to the northeast of Kalinin to rejoin the main body of the division. Earlier, a group of 15 men, with sooty faces and burnt and torn uniforms, made their way across the Tvertsa to rejoin the 937th. They were from the 4th Company of the 2nd Battalion, led by Lt. Bukshenko, who had been cut off while holding a few buildings near the bridge since October 17. They were discovered the next day and an artillery piece had been brought up for direct fire on their strongpoint. When the building caught fire, Bukshenko ordered his men to make their way to the neighboring house. They had pulled out overnight on October 19/20, carrying their two wounded with them. Later in the day the commander of the regiment, Maj. M. T. Khryukin, was wounded in the leg and the regimental commissar, Chekmarev, had his helmet knocked off by a shell splinter. That night the regiment received replacements, including a new commander, Maj. E. G. Kolkov.

During October 21 the 133rd Division attacked the positions of 36th Motorized covering the north end of the Gorbatov Bridge. The fighting see-sawed through the day before the German forces gained the upper hand and forced the 133rd to fall back, taking control of two churches that had been the foci of the battle. There they came under heavy fire from the 937th Regiment and the 531st Artillery. German engineers blew up the eastern church before retreating to positions just north of the Volga. That evening, Konev took advantage of the relative lull in operations to reorganize his forces, moving the 256th to 30th Army, joining the 5th and 185th Rifle Divisions and 21st Tank Brigade, with orders to clear the northeastern and southern sectors of the city by the end of October 23.

During October 22 the 129th Infantry Division began taking over the southern sector of Kalinin from 36th Motorized. The next day the 5th and 256th Divisions made minor probes, unable to do more in their exhausted condition until the arrival of the 185th. The Army commander, Maj. Gen. V. A. Khomenko, reported that the two rifle regiments of the 256th numbered no more that 200-300 men each, in common with those of the 5th. The 256th's probe was against the reinforced motorcycle battalion of 6th Panzer and one battalion of 36th Motorized, but only obtained meagre results. By now the German forces were well dug in and supported by Hs 123 dive bombers. On October 24 the division managed to reach Barminovka, less than 1,000m east of the main part of the city, but was forced to break off its attack and dig in.

On October 25 Khomenko reported that there was no reasonable prospect of clearing Kalinin, and he was concerned about a new German offensive. He noted the weakness of his 256th and 5th Divisions, and his 21st Tanks, with just 34 vehicles still operational. The fighting in Kalinin died down, due to the mutual exhaustion of both sides, and the deteriorating weather. By the beginning of December the division had been transferred again, now to the 31st Army of Kalinin Front.

== Rzhev-Vyazma Offensive ==
As of the start of the new year the 256th had been moved to the reserves of Kalinin Front. By this time the division had been reunited, and reported a strength of over 6,000 personnel. Beginning on January 8, 1942, Kalinin Front took part in the Rzhev-Vyazma Offensive Operation, which was planned "to encircle, and then capture or destroy the enemy's entire Mozhaisk - Gzhatsk - Vyasma grouping", that is, what later became known as the Rzhev salient. Later in the month the division came under command of General Maslennikov's 39th Army.

During the January advance, 39th Army bypassed north of Rzhev itself in an effort to get behind the city and encircle the forces of German 9th Army holding there. It advanced into a gap between Bely and Olenino and by the third week of the month was fighting for Sychyovka from the west, even taking the town's railway station. 29th Army and the 11th Cavalry Corps also entered the gap, but despite bitter fighting and reinforcements from 39th Army, the 29th was unable to liberate Rzhev. On January 23, a German counterattack from Olenino and Rzhev constricted the gap, worsening an already critical supply situation for the two Armies. A further attack on February 5 cut the 29th off from the 39th. Despite urgent efforts, including paratroop operations, the German cordon could not be pierced, and the survivors of 29th Army trickled through to the lines of the 39th and 30th Armies during the rest of the month.

During the following months 39th Army held its positions, always under severe supply constraints, especially during the spring rasputitsa. On March 11, General Goryachev took over command of the 185th Division in addition to the 256th; he left the latter on May 2 and the former on May 6 to attend the Voroshilov Academy. He would later lead the 7th and 35th Guards Rifle Corps, being promoted to the rank of lieutenant general in April 1943. He was replaced in command of the 256th by Col. Stanislav Giliarovich Poplavskii, but this officer was in turn replaced by Lt. Col. Ivan Kuzmich Eliseev on June 16.

In May and June, Army Group Center began planning a limited offensive to eliminate the smaller Soviet salients to its rear. Operation Seydlitz began on July 2, and faced heavy resistance, but by July 5 General Maslennikov had decided to withdraw from the salient. On July 9, the escape corridor was more-or-less sealed. Maslennikov, wounded in the leg, was flown out of the pocket on the night of July 18, and in the course of the day all the scattered and disorganized units of the Army were combined into a single regiment, which became part of the 256th. Altogether there were up to 5,000 men, most of whom crossed the Bely–Kostritsy road. Lt. Gen. I. A. Bogdanov, the Army's deputy commander, decided to make a sudden breakout attempt in coordination with units of 22nd and 41st Armies. Despite stubborn German resistance, by 2300 hours on July 21 3,500 had come out of the encirclement and by 0400 on July 22 more than 10,000 men. A report from 22nd Army stated:

People are emerging in an organized fashion. Men are collapsing from utter exhaustion and the lack of food. The bulk of those who have come out have gathered at an assembly point, [and there is] heavy movement in the corridor through the German lines. Most of the men are armed with rifles and submachine guns.

During July, 39th Army recorded 23,647 total personnel losses, including 22,749 missing-in-action. The remnants of the 256th were withdrawn for reforming, all the way to the Arkhangelsk Military District. On August 28 Col. Aleksei Pavlovich Baraboshkin took command of the division.

== Battles for Leningrad ==
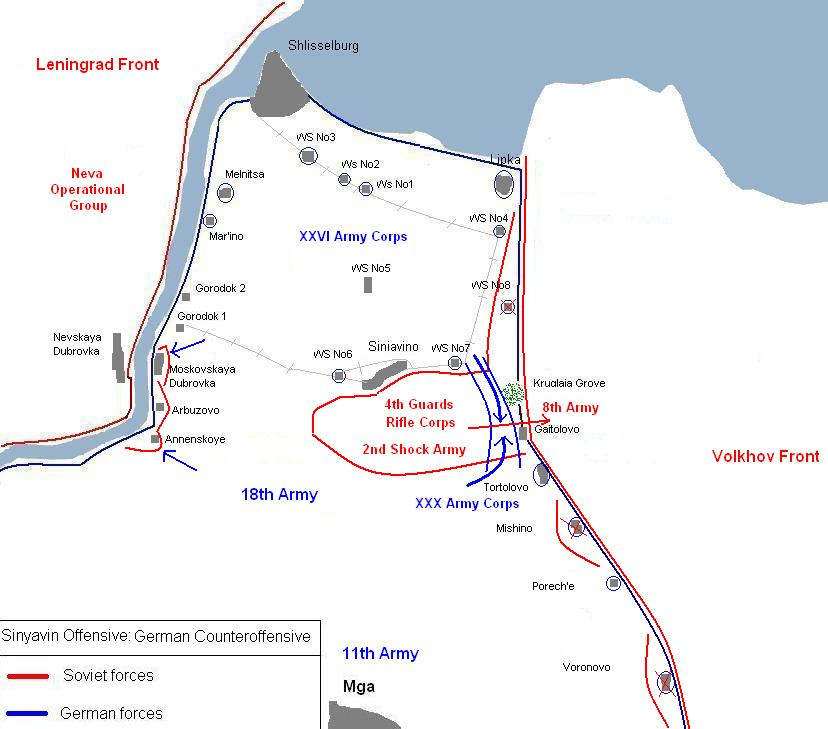
Encirclement of 2nd Shock Army, September 25, 1942

When the rebuilding was through in September the division was assigned to the 2nd Shock Army in Volkhov Front, and re-entered the fighting front on September 21. The German 11th Army was in the process of defeating the Second Sinyavino Offensive. Most of 2nd Shock had been brought to a halt in the neck of land south and east of Sinyavino in late August, and on the day the 256th arrived the commander of 11th Army, Field Marshal E. von Manstein, began a carefully planned counterstroke to cut off the penetration at its base. Overcoming desperate Soviet resistance the counterattacking German forces linked up near Gaitolovo on September 25, encircling the bulk of the 2nd Shock and 8th Armies.

Even before the linkup the STAVKA had ordered the Front commander, Army Gen. K. A. Meretskov, to mount a fresh operation to thwart Manstein's effort. Meretskov's revised plan, submitted on September 21, requested the use of the 256th and 314th Rifle Divisions and 73rd Rifle Brigade, plus aircraft, armor and ammunition. This was largely approved at 0110 hours on September 24. The operation was to be coordinated with 55th Army and the Neva Operational Group in Leningrad itself. However, in heavy fighting from September 30 through October 15 Manstein's forces systematically reduced the encirclement and restored the original front. The best that could be said from the Soviet side is that the German effort had cost them an unprecedented 26,000 casualties.

=== Operation Iskra ===
During October the 256th was transferred to 8th Army, still in Volkhov Front. On December 19 Colonel Baraboshkin left the division; he would later lead the 11th Rifle Division. He was replaced by Col. Fyodor Kuzmich Fetisov. This officer had earlier commanded the 286th Rifle Division and, after a few months furthering his military education, took over the 11th Division. He would be promoted to the rank of major general on March 26, 1943. Also during December the 256th returned to 2nd Shock.

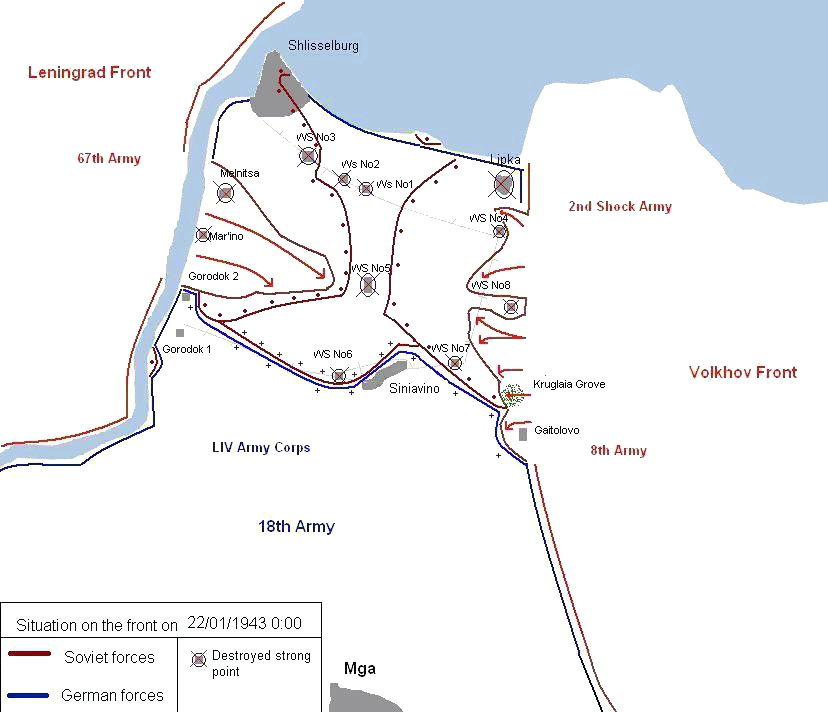
Operation Iskra

The planning for a new effort to break the German blockade, dubbed Operation Iskra ("Spark") began shortly after the previous offensive had failed. The timing of the offensive would depend on a hard freeze of the Neva River, as the forces of Army Gen. L. A. Govorov's Leningrad Front lacked river-crossing equipment, especially for artillery and heavy tanks. He urged that both Fronts attack simultaneously, and the STAVKA approved his plan with only minor amendments on December 2. 2nd Shock would form the assault group for Volkhov Front, while 67th Army would do the same for Leningrad Front. Meretskov's Front was substantially reinforced with five rifle divisions, three ski brigades and four aerosan battalions. While both Fronts were prepared by January 1, on December 27 poor ice conditions on the Neva forced Govorov to request a delay; the offensive was postponed until January 10–12, 1943. 2nd Shock was to smash the German defenses on a 12 km-wide sector from Lipka to Gaitolovo, destroy the German forces in the eastern part of the salient in cooperation with 8th Army, and link up with 67th Army. For this task it had 11 rifle divisions, several brigades (including four of tanks), and a total of 37 artillery and mortar regiments.

The offensive began on January 12 with a 140-minute artillery preparation on the 2nd Shock Army's front. All regimental and divisional artillery was mounted on skis or sleighs to improve mobility. The 256th was in the Army's first echelon, attacking in the center with the 191st and 372nd Rifle Divisions, but without any armor support due to the broken, forested and swampy terrain they faced. They went in at 1115 hours along the sector from Lipka to Gaitolovo with two more divisions on their left. Against heavy resistance the assaulting infantry penetrated the forward edge of the 227th Infantry Division's defenses and advanced 2 km north and south of Workers Settlement No. 8. Despite heavy fire from that place and Kruglaya Grove, Fetisov's right-flank regiment managed to wedge between the two strongpoints but could advance no farther through the murderous fire.

By the end of January 13 the Army had penetrated German defenses in two sectors along the front between Lipka and Gaitolovo, one of which was 3 km deep. During the next day the advance slowed to a snail's pace in intense fighting, despite the commitment of most of 2nd Shock's reserves. The 256th captured Podgornyi Station and, wheeling its front to the southwest, attacked German positions on the approaches to Sinyavino. By January 17 the command of Army Group North understood the perilous situation its forces faced as the two Soviet Fronts were about to link up, as they did at 0930 hours on January 18, just east of Workers Settlement No. 1. At this point the joint force was ordered to wheel southward to capture Sinyavino and the Gorodok settlements. By this time the victorious forces were exhausted and the offensive was halted on January 31.

=== Mga Offensives ===
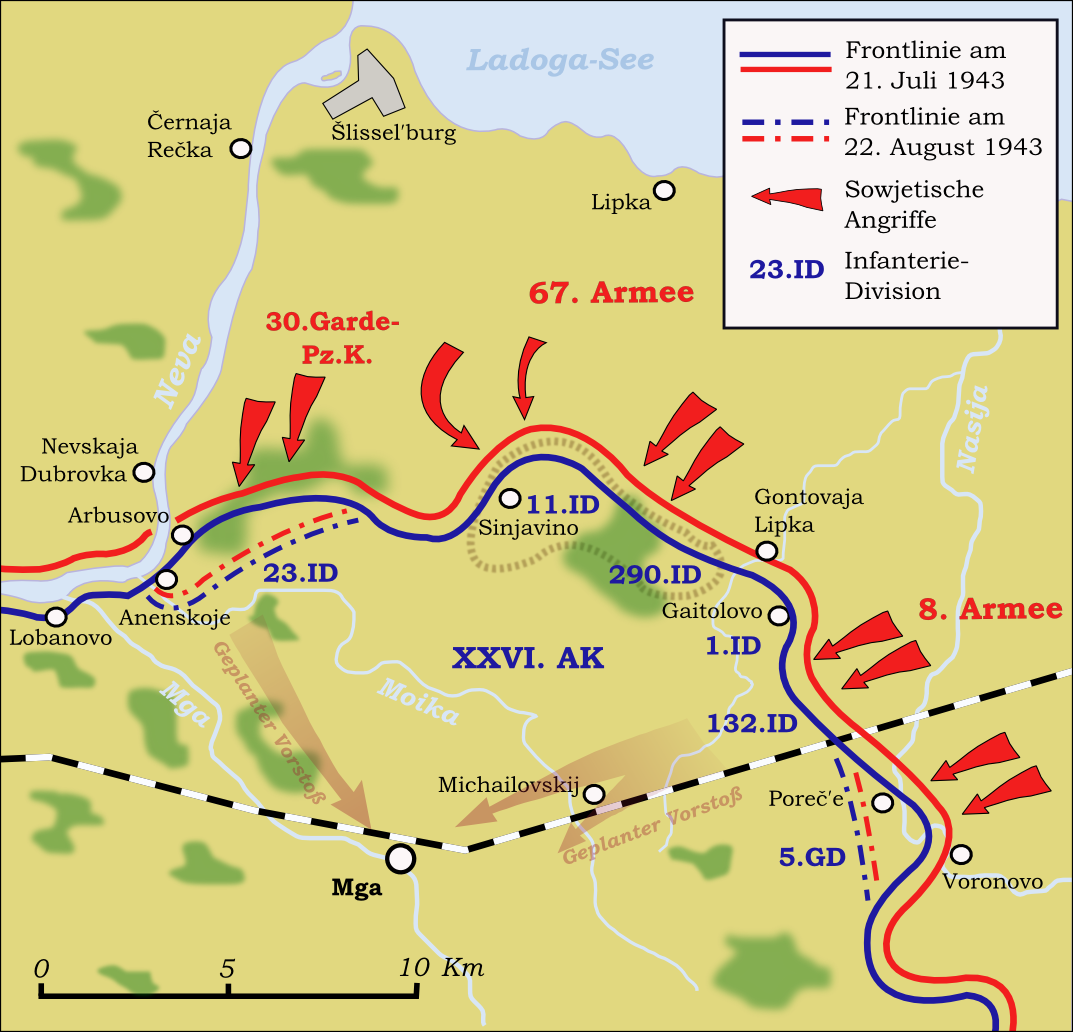
Mga (5th Sinyavino) Offensive, July 22 - September 25, 1943

During February the division returned to direct command of Volkhov Front before joining 8th Army in March. On March 19 this Army began a new assault toward Mga from its sector south of Voronovo after having been delayed:

The headquarters of the 8th Army... carefully planned the preparation and conduct of the operation under the chief of staff of the front... However, the forested swampy terrain spring conditions, the absence of roads, inadequate intelligence data about the enemy, especially concerning his system of fires in the depths of the first defensive belt, created definite difficulties in planning the employment of artillery, tanks and aviation. Greater difficulties were encountered with organizing supply of ammunition and other material and also with the creation of the required force grouping. All this led to the fact that the commencement of the offensive had to be delayed from 8 to 19 March.

The Army contained nine rifle divisions plus two rifle brigades, two tank brigades and four tank regiments, and the 256th was in first echelon; it faced the three infantry divisions of XXVI Army Corps. The assault began after a 135-minute artillery preparation and during the first three days of intense fighting the first echelon divisions penetrated 3–4 km along a 7 km front at the junction of the defending 1st and 223rd Infantry Divisions. The Army commander then committed a small mobile group with orders to cut the rail line between Mga and Kirishi, and then wheel northwest towards Mga Station. Despite heavy rain which prevented any air support, the group reached the rail line east of Turyshkino Station before being halted by hastily assembled German reinforcements. Despite the initial failure, Marshal Zhukov insisted the attacks continue through the rest of March, including the commitment of the second echelon formations, but further gains were marginal.

On April 28 the 256th was awarded the Order of the Red Banner. In May the division returned to the Front reserves, where it remained into June, before returning to 8th Army in the buildup to the Mga (Fifth Sinyavino) Offensive. This began on July 22 with 8th Army attacking east of Mga, on an attack front of 13.6 km and aiming to link up with 67th Army at or near Mga while detaching two rifle divisions and a tank brigade to strike at Sinyavino from the south. In order to penetrate the strong German defenses the Army commander, Lt. Gen. F. N. Starikov, organized his main forces into two shock groups. The 256th was in the first echelon of the southern shock group along with the 364th Rifle Division. The offensive was preceded by six days of artillery fire on the enemy positions, which were held by the 132nd Infantry Division. Despite the careful preparations the attack stalled after capturing the forward German trenches. In late July, Starikov withdrew the 256th for rest and refitting. Starikov made several efforts to renew the drive but was forced to call a halt on August 16, and his Army went over to the defense on August 22. By this time one soldier of the 132nd Infantry wrote that his division was "reduced by casualties and exhausted to the point of incoherence", but losses on the Soviet side were also heavy.

==== Sixth Sinyavino Offensive ====
A Sixth (and final) Sinyavino Offensive was scheduled for mid-September. The 30th Guards Rifle Corps, under direct command of Leningrad Front, was assigned the task of storming the Sinyavino Heights. The 256th was under direct command of Volkhov Front and formed a southern shock group with the 18th, 311th and 378th Rifle Divisions to attack the positions of 5th Mountain Division between the Mga rail line and Voronovo. The attack was to begin with an "artillery offensive", essentially a creeping barrage. The attack began on September 15 and scored an immediate success when 30th Guards captured the Heights in only 30 minutes. The southern shock group managed to slightly penetrate the German defenses before being contained. The STAVKA called a halt on September 18.

== Leningrad-Novgorod Offensive ==
Later that month the division was moved to 59th Army, still in Volkhov Front, where it was assigned to 6th Rifle Corps. This assignment was short-lived as it was moved again in October, now to 7th Rifle Corps of 54th Army in the same Front. On December 18, General Fetisov was given command of the 119th Rifle Corps, and was replaced by Col. Anatolii Gavrilovich Koziev. This officer came directly from the 177th Rifle Division, which he had led for two years. He would be promoted to the rank of major general on June 3, 1944 and remained in command into the postwar.

At the start of the new year the 7th Corps (256th and 382nd Rifle Divisions) was under direct command of the Front. In the plan for the Leningrad-Novgorod Offensive, 59th Army was assigned the main role in the liberation of the latter city. On January 14, after pulverizing the German defenses by firing 133,000 artillery shells during its preparation, the Army's leading corps deployed assault detachments at 1050 hours. 6th Corps stalled after advancing only 1,000 metres, but a premature attack by 14th Rifle Corps' 378th Division scored a surprise success. By late on January 16 these two Corps, with reinforcements, had torn a gaping 20 km hole in the Germans' main defensive belt. At about this time 7th Corps was subordinated to the Army. On January 18 the XXXVIII Army Corps was ordered to abandon the city and withdraw along the only remaining road to the west. At 0930 hours on January 20 the 14th Corps liberated Novgorod without a fight after the last German rearguard destroyed the bridge over the Volkhov.

=== Advance on Luga ===
Following this victory the next objective for 59th Army was the town of Luga. Seizing this would cut off both the XXXVIII and XXVIII Army Corps but it would require an advance through difficult terrain with significant engineer support. The 6th, 7th and 112th Rifle Corps set out on January 21, with 7th Corps assigned to fill the gaps between 6th and 14th Corps and exploit to Peredolskaya Station on the Leningrad–Dno rail line southeast of Luga. While 6th Corps was advancing at a snail's pace the 7th and 14th made appreciably better progress on the left flank. Supported by the 7th Guards Tank Brigade, which had just been committed from Front reserve, the 256th conducted a rapid dash through the swamps and reached the outskirts of Peredolskaya Station late on January 27. Throughout this advance the division had been cooperating closely with the nearby 5th Partisan Brigade. By this time the 7th Corps had penetrated the entire German second defense line and had advanced up to 35 km to the west and southwest in five days. Since Volkhov Front was now considerably farther south than anticipated, General Meretskov moved the 7th and 14th Corps to 8th Army. Meanwhile, on the same date the final breaking of the siege of Leningrad was celebrated.

==== Encirclement at Okliuzhe ====
Back in 59th Army the 6th Corps managed to seize a small bridgehead over the Luga River, but then stalled. The liberation of Luga now fell to 8th Army. The fighting for Peredolskaya Station was extended as it changed hands three time with fresh German reserves being fed into the battle, including the 285th Security and part of 12th Panzer Division. Although 7th Corps managed to advance several more kilometres westward by January 30 and cut the Leningrad–Dno line, Luga remained firmly in German hands. On February 1 a group of two German battalions and 15 tanks struck the 372nd Division, on the right flank of 7th Corps, and drove it back in disorder, thereby exposing the 256th's right flank. At the same time the 8th Jäger Division pushed part of 14th Corps, operating on the division's left flank, off to the north. These efforts were joined by 12th Panzer. Even though 7th Corps was threatened with encirclement, Koziev ignored the threat and continued attacking westward. Two of his regiments crossed the Luga–Pskov road near Zapliuse on February 2. The following day the two German divisions linked up southwest of Melkovichi, cutting off all of the 256th and two regiments of the 372nd. Meretskov initially ordered a relief operation by the 378th Division, but when this proved impossible he approved a new plan on February 4.

This plan called for the 99th Rifle Corps to be moved up from 8th Army's second echelon and attack westward toward Utorgosh and Strugi Krasnye on the Luga–Pskov railroad to cut German withdrawal routes from Luga. Meanwhile, 14th Corps was to protect 99th Corps' left flank by attacking toward Soltsy. However this "big solution", which did nothing to assist the 256th directly, was a failure. German Groups Karow and Freissner tried to destroy the division from February 6–15. Throughout the battle Koziev flew around the encirclement in a Po-2 aircraft directing his beleaguered forces. From February 2–8, 8th Army flew 21,644 kg of supplies into the pocket, including 2,500 kg of food and 19,000 kg of ammunition. By February 9 the 256th had suffered 400 wounded, most of whom were treated at the 5th Partisan Brigade hospital.

The division maintained some communications with the outside, sending one officer out with the partisans on February 7, and two groups of 25 men each entered the encirclement on February 8 with ammunition and medicine. Meanwhile, German forces pushed the division back from the Luga–Pskov road but were not able to destroy it. Air supply continued on the night of February 13–14. Finally, on February 15 units of 59th Army, which were attacking from the north, managed to relieve the pocket. On February 21 Koziev was made a Hero of the Soviet Union for his leadership during the battle.

Already by February 4, Army Group North headquarters had informed the OKH that the two Soviet Fronts were repositioning their forces to encircle the bulk of 18th Army in the Luga region. Gen. W. Model, now in command of the Army Group, proposed a counterstrike, particularly against the 42nd Army, but this was unsuccessful, leaving him no alternative to evacuating Luga on February 12. On February 15, Volkhov Front, having become surplus to requirements, was disbanded, and 8th Army joined Leningrad Front, while the 256th was reassigned to 6th Rifle Corps.

== Into the Baltic States ==
By the end of February many of the Front's rifle divisions had lost 2,500-3,500 personnel each since the start of the offensive. In a directive issued on February 22 the STAVKA approved Govorov's plan to employ his 2nd Shock, 59th, and, once it arrived in the region, 8th Army to finally smash the German defenses at Narva. The need to regroup and replenish his Front's forces delayed the new offensive into early March. 8th Army was to regroup:

... from the Pskov to the Narva axis from 25 to 25 February and, after the isthmus north of Lake Chud has been overcome, will be ready for commitment to exploit the attack to the southwest from behind the 59th Army's left flank.

Early on March 1 the 2nd Shock and 59th struck but made very limited progress over the next two days, after which German forces launched heavy counterattacks against the 59th; the fighting raged on this sector until April 8 without any resolution.

=== Battles for Narva ===
Despite its earlier failures the 2nd Shock resumed its offensive on March 18 with 6th Rifle Corps, which had been transferred from 8th Army, spearheading the assault. The 256th attacked from the Auvere and Khindinurga line, managed to expand the bridgehead west of the Narva River and seized a small section of the Tallinn–Narva rail line. After making this vital gain, on March 24 Govorov requested permission to halt his offensive for three to four weeks to prepare more thoroughly for a new offensive. In the event, on March 26 German Group Narva mounted a surprise counterstroke to restore its defenses along the Narva. This attack, along with another effort on April 19, were largely futile in terms of ground gained, but did frustrate Soviet efforts to take Narva and advance into Estonia. By the beginning of April the 6th Corps had moved to 59th Army, but during the month the division returned to 8th Army, where it was assigned to the 112th Rifle Corps. It remained under these commands until June when it was moved to the 117th Rifle Corps in the same Army. The division was recognized for its role in the long-delayed capture of the city with a battle honor:

NARVA... 256th Rifle Division (Maj, Gen. Koziev, Anatolii Gavrilovich)... The troops who participated in the liberation of Narva, by the order of the Supreme High Command of 26 July 1944, and a commendation in Moscow, are given a salute of 20 artillery salvoes from 224 guns.

Within days it was transferred again, now to the 124th Rifle Corps in 2nd Shock Army, but in August this Corps was moved to 42nd Army of 2nd Baltic Front.

=== Courland Pocket ===
The 256th was under these commands in mid-September advancing through eastern Latvia in the area north of Krustpils. By the second week of October it had reached the region northeast of Limbaži. It would spend most of the rest of the war blockading the German forces blockaded in the Courland Pocket in western Latvia, as of the beginning of December in the 110th Rifle Corps in the same Army and Front. In March 1945 it was briefly reassigned to the 19th Guards Rifle Corps of 10th Guards Army, back in Leningrad Front.

== Postwar ==
In April the division, back in 110th Corps, also returned to 22nd Army, which was in the Reserve of the Supreme High Command, and began moving south. By July it was in the Odesa Military District, with the Corps headquarters at Kotovsk. On October 22 it was disbanded, along with its Corps. Koziev remained in command until the division was disbanded and continued to serve in the Soviet Army until his retirement in August 1966. He lived in Moscow until his death on January 30, 1985 at the age of 78.
