= 257th Rifle Division (July 1941 formation) =

Infantry division of the Red Army

The 257th Rifle Division (Russian: 257-я стрелковая дивизия) was an infantry division of the Red Army, the first unit to bear the designation during World War II.

== History ==
The 257th Rifle Division, the first of three unrelated units to share the designation during World War II, began forming shortly after the beginning of the German invasion of the Soviet Union, in accordance with a 29 June 1941 directive of the State Defense Committee that ordered the formation of fifteen rifle divisions from the NKVD troops. The division was formed in Tula from a cadre that included 500 officers and 1,000 other ranks from the NKVD Border Troops, under the command of border troops staff officer Colonel Viktor Urbanovich. Brought up to strength by residents of Tula, Kuybyshev and Saratov Oblasts, the division formed between 11 and 19 July. After the formation process ended, the 257th was assigned to the newly formed 34th Army, with which it entrained on 18 July to man the Mozhaisk Defense Line west of Maloyaroslavets. The army was moved forward in preparation for a counterattack towards Dno, being ordered on 25 July to concentrate on the line of Ruchi, Chirki and Dvorets station along the Valday–Staraya Russa railway line northeast of Demyansk by 4 August.

The division was at almost full strength with 11,076 men and 3,319 horses on 1 August, but only had a few saddles for the horses and just over a third of its authorized trucks. Like the other divisions of the 34th Army, it was well equipped with small arms but lacked anti-aircraft guns and divisional guns. For artillery the division fielded twelve 45 mm guns that lacked sights, less than half of its authorized artillery. The 257th was the only division of the 34th that included its authorized tank battalion, which fielded ten T-37, T-38 and T-40 light tanks.

The five divisions of the army finished concentrating by 2 August, with the 257th in the army reserve. The division was placed on the right flank of the 34th Army in the first echelon for the army's assault during the Staraya Russa counterattack. At the time, the division was headquartered in the forest northeast of Kulakovo, and its regiments in the forest, with the 953rd Regiment northwest of Chechenchits, the 943rd in the forest west of Shelgunovo, and the 953rd in Puryshevo, Bor and Ozhedovo-1. The division's initial objective was to take the line through Dretino, Mesyatsevo, and the Kamenka river. The offensive of the 34th Army began on 12 August, with the division fulfilling its objectives for the first day due to the lack of resistance: only small groups of German troops were present in the division's sector. The advance continued on 13 August, against weak resistance.

Despite the initial advances, the 34th Army's attack missed the major German forces, exposing it to counterattack. Lacking both effective air cover and anti-aircraft guns, the divisions of the 34th Army were subjected to German air attack from 13 August. Nevertheless, army commander Kuzma Kachanov ordered the army to attack in the general direction of Gruzovo on 14 August to encircle and destroy the German troops around Staraya Russa. The 257th was tasked with reaching the line of Markovo, Morilnitsa, and a subsequent attack on Tuleblya. During the day, the division reached the line of Bela, Ilovets, and Malovasilyevsky Bor, continuing to advance towards Tuleblya.

In intense defensive battles the division fought in the area of Drotino, Vzglyady and Rykanovo, and on the Pola river. Superior German forces broke through the front and reached the rear of the division. On 11 September elements of the division fought their way out of the encirclement in the area of Lake Seliger. The division was reduced to 2,008 men with 1,755 rifles and no other equipment on 20 September. The division had been too heavily depleted to rebuild and was disbanded on 16 October as a result.
