= 255th Rifle Division =

WW2 Red Army military unit

255th Rifle Division (July 10, 1941 – August 3, 1942) 255th Rifle Division (July 6, 1943 – April 30, 1955)
- Active: 1941–1955
- Country: Soviet Union
- Branch: Red Army; Soviet Army
- Type: Infantry
- Size: Division
- Engagements: Battle of Kiev (1941); Battle of Rostov (1941); Barvenkovo–Lozovaya offensive Second Battle of Kharkov; Case Blue; Soviet invasion of Manchuria

Commanders
- Notable commanders: Maj. Gen. Ivan Terentievich Zamertsev; Col. Fyodor Aristarovich Makulkin; Maj. Gen. Yakov Filippovich Yeryomenko; Col. Ivan Matveevich Sukhov

The 255th Rifle Division was formed in the Odessa Military District as a reserve infantry division of the Red Army about two weeks after the German invasion of the USSR. It was based on the shtat (table of organization and equipment) of April 5, 1941 with modifications due to the emergency. Once formed, in late August it was assigned to the 2nd formation of the 6th Army in Southern Front; this Army was soon reassigned to Southwestern Front. The division saw its first major combat in the Barvenkovo–Lozovaya offensive in January 1942 which carved out the Izium salient, but it suffered significant losses which were never adequately replaced. Due to its low strength it was removed from the salient and served as a reserve formation until the beginning of the German summer offensive. In the second week of July, while serving in 9th Army, it was largely encircled by elements of German 6th Army near Millerovo. While a cadre was able to escape and retreat south toward the Caucasus the division was too badly damaged to be rebuilt and it was disbanded.

A new 255th was formed in July 1943 in the 15th Army of Far Eastern Front. It remained under these commands on this quiet sector until the buildup to the Soviet invasion of Manchuria in August 1945. In the event the division was given a defensive assignment while being on call as a possible reserve for 15th Army, but it saw no combat before the Japanese surrender. Despite its undistinguished career the 255th continued to serve in the Far East until April 1955, when it was redesignated as the 2nd formation of the 35th Rifle Division.

== 1st Formation ==
The 255th began forming on July 10 at Pavlohrad in the Odessa Military District. Once formed from militia and reservists in the area the division had following order of battle:

- 968th Rifle Regiment
- 970th Rifle Regiment
- 972nd Rifle Regiment
- 811th Artillery Regiment
- 324th Antitank Battalion
- 487th Antiaircraft Battery (later 543rd Antiaircraft Battalion)
- 343rd Reconnaissance Company
- 548th Sapper Battalion
- 630th Signal Battalion
- 333rd Medical/Sanitation Battalion
- 295th Chemical Defense (Anti-gas) Company
- 712th Motor Transport Battalion
- 677th Divisional Veterinary Hospital
- 368th Field Bakery
- 982nd Field Postal Station
- 831st Field Office of the State Bank

Col. Ivan Terentievich Zamertsev took command of the division on the day it began forming. As Pavlohrad was east of the Dniepr River the division did not suffer the same fate as the 1st formation of the 253rd Rifle Division, which was overrun near Kryvyi Rih as it was attempting to form. After about seven weeks it was assigned to 6th Army in Southern Front. When the final stage of the Battle of Kyiv began in September the 6th Army was east of 1st Panzer Army's breakthrough across the Dniepr and was not swept up in the encirclement. By the beginning of October the Army, which now comprised the 255th, 270th and 275th Rifle Divisions, plus the 26th and 28th Cavalry Divisions, was part of the rebuilding Southwestern Front.

In mid-October the STAVKA, hard-pressed on the approaches to Moscow and with few available reserves, ordered the Southwestern and Southern Fronts to establish a new defense line along the Oskol, Northern Donets, and Mius rivers between October 17-30. On October 25 the German 6th Army drove Southwestern Front's 38th Army out of Kharkiv after five days of fighting. In the following days, Southwestern Front was able to establish a stabilized line in defenses some 70-80km east of the line designated by STAVKA.

On November 9 Marshal S. K. Timoshenko, commander of the Southwestern Direction as well as Southwestern Front, submitted proposals to the STAVKA to attack German concentrations in the Rostov area. Stalin and Marshal B. M. Shaposhnikov gave their general approval but made it clear that reinforcements could not be expected. Timoshenko's plan largely relied on forces of Southern Front in its initial phase. The counteroffensive turned out to be a surprise success which drove 1st Panzer Army out of the city in the last days of the month and set the stage for an expanded push westward.

=== Barvenkovo–Lozovaya Offensive ===
Timoshenko soon approached Stalin with his plan for a broad offensive by the Bryansk, Southwestern and Southern Fronts, to take place in January-February 1942 and consisting of two major operations. The second operation would be mounted by the left wing of the Southwestern and Southern Fronts to free the Donbas and bring Soviet troops up to the Dniepr, with northern cover for this being provided by Southwestern Front forces also moving into the Kharkiv area. Timoshenko's request for reinforcements for this effort was entirely unrealistic and Shaposhnikov directed him to scale back. In the revised plan the new commander of Southwestern Front, Lt. Gen. F. Ya. Kostenko, would prepare to attack with his 6th and 38th Armies in the Chuhuiv–Balakliia–Izium area and seize Kharkiv and Krasnohrad, thereby covering the Southern Front's operations from the northwest.

The offensive began on January 18, at which time the 6th Army had five rifle divisions and one cavalry division under command. Over the next four days the 6th and 57th Armies pushed some 32km to the west, but at Balakliia and Sloviansk two German infantry divisions held on in a desperate effort to stop the Soviet breakthrough from widening. At Balakliia, 6th Army, in the whipping winds of deep winter, crashed into attack after attack against this vital corner post of the German defenses, the northern shoulder of the Izium bend penetration. The Soviet forces fought from their snow forts while the German forces huddled in the warmth of huts and houses. On January 24 Timoshenko introduced the 9th Army to operate between 37th and 57th Armies. On both sides of Izium the salient was expanded until Lozovaya was taken on the 27th. This marked the culmination of the offensive as German reserves arrived from Kharkiv. Late in the month the 255th was transferred to the reserves of Southern Front.

=== Second Battle of Kharkiv ===
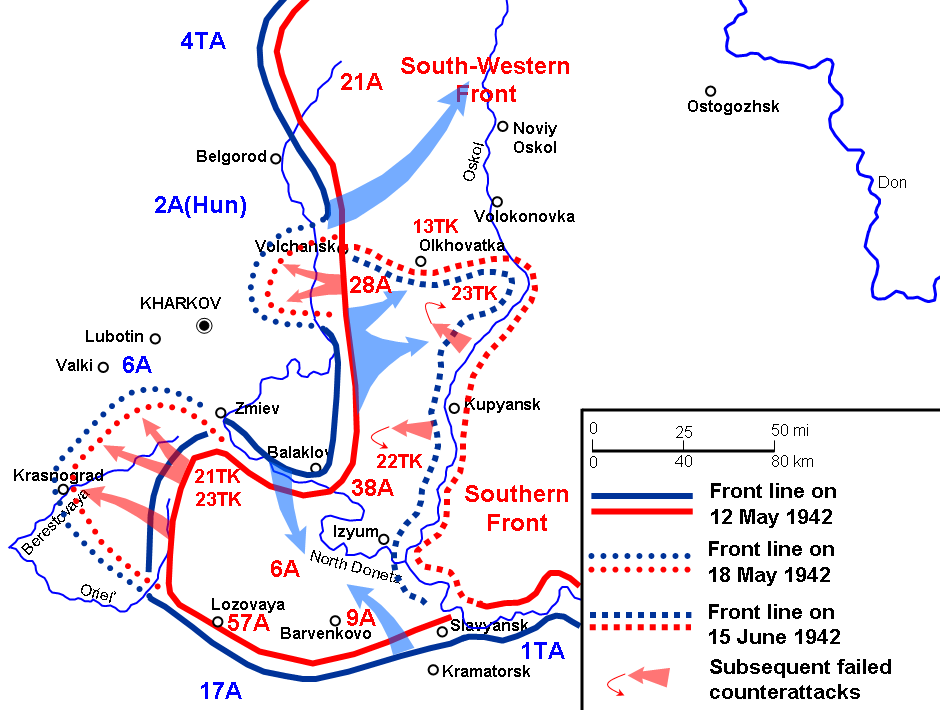
Izium salient and the Second Kharkiv offensive

During February the division was reassigned to 57th Army, still in Southern Front, where it remained into April. The Army was deployed in the southwestern sector of the Izium salient, generally in the Lozova Raion. On March 27, Colonel Zamertsev was promoted to the rank of major general. In preparation for a renewed offensive to retake Kharkiv the 255th was removed from the salient under terms of STAVKA Order No. 13986 to help form a Southern Front commander's reserve of seven rifle divisions that could only be employed with the explicit permission of the High Command.

As a result of being removed from 57th Army the 255th was able to avoid the disaster that enveloped the Soviet forces in the salient in late May. In a report dated June 7 to the Red Army General Staff, Lt. Gen. R. Ya. Malinovskii, commander of Southern Front, noted in passing that in mid-April the 255th, which had been detached to the Voroshilovgrad area, had not fully recovered from the winter battles and numbered only 5,434 personnel.

=== Case Blue ===
By the beginning of June it was becoming clear that Army Group South was gearing up for its summer offensive in the same area where the Red Army had just suffered such devastating losses. The 255th was now assigned to 24th Army, still in Southern Front. As the STAVKA scrambled to build a defense the division was moved again, now to 9th Army in Southwestern Front. General Zamertsev left the division on June 30 to take command of the 3rd Guards Rifle Corps. He would lead several other Corps during the coming years and ended the war as acting commandant of Budapest. He was replaced by Lt. Col. Daniil Antonovich Ivanchenko, who would remain in command for the brief remainder of the 1st formation's existence.

9th Army was under command of Lt. Gen. A. I. Lopatin and was on the left (south) flank of the Front, tying in with 38th Army near Kupiansk and then southward along the eastern banks of the Oskil and Northern Donets to Krasnyi Lyman. As of July 8 Lopatin had five divisions (318th, 296th, 51st, 140th and 255th) in his first echelon, backed up by three more divisions plus two "destroyer" (antitank) brigades. At dawn that day the commander of Army Group South, Field Marshal F. von Bock, recognizing that the 9th and 38th Armies were beginning to withdraw, authorized the infantry forces on 1st Panzer Army's right wing and center to advance over the Oskil and Northern Donets in pursuit. The XI and XXXXIV Army Corps crossed the two rivers and advanced 10-15km eastward. By nightfall they reached the approaches to the Krasnaya River, which by now was defended by 9th Army and the weaker half of 38th Army. The same day, the 1st Panzer Army hastily shifted its III and XIV Panzer Corps forward into positions from which they could mount their main thrust against the left wing of Southwestern Front and the right wing of Southern Front the next morning.

Beginning on July 6 the XVII Army Corps and XXXX Panzer Corps of 6th Army had scattered the 28th Army and by July 9 most of 38th Army to its south had been encircled. This Army formed a combat group that was eventually able to withdraw north of the Don River, while much of the rest of the two Armies was trapped between the Aidar and the Chertkovo Rivers. German intelligence identified the 255th as part of the "bag", despite it still being part of 9th Army. Apparently enough of the division, including the command cadre, escaped this catastrophe that as of August 1 it was still listed as part of the reorganizing 9th Army in North Caucasian Front. This was a temporary respite; some Soviet sources state it was disbanded on July 15 due to heavy losses while others state it was written off on August 3.

== 2nd Formation ==
A new 255th Rifle Division was formed on July 6, 1943 in the 15th Army of Far Eastern Front. Its order of battle was very similar to that of the 1st formation:

- 968th Rifle Regiment
- 970th Rifle Regiment
- 972nd Rifle Regiment
- 811th Artillery Regiment
- 476th Self-Propelled Artillery Battalion (in 1945)
- 324th Antitank Battalion
- 343rd Reconnaissance Company
- 548th Sapper Battalion
- 630th Signal Battalion (later 1463rd Signal Company)
- 333rd Medical/Sanitation Battalion
- 295th Chemical Defense (Anti-gas) Company
- 412th Motor Transport Company
- 369th Divisional Veterinary Hospital
- 437th Field Bakery
- 2859th Field Postal Station
- 1842nd Field Office of the State Bank

Col. Fyodor Aristarovich Makulkin was appointed to command on the same date and would remain in this position until March 4, 1944. He was replaced by Maj. Gen. Yakov Filippovich Yeryomenko, who had previously led both the 116th and 169th Rifle Divisions. On July 13, Yeryomenko was placed at the disposal on the military council of the Front. He would later command both the 24th Guards and the 67th Guards Rifle Divisions, but died of illness in February 1945. Col. Ivan Matveevich Sukhov took over the 255th and would remain in this post until February 10, 1949. When the fighting ended in Europe it was still in 15th Army, along with the 34th, 361st and 388th Rifle Divisions and the 102nd Fortified Region. The 476th SU Battalion, equipped with SU-76s, was added in 1945, in common with many other rifle divisions in the Far East, in order to provide mobile firepower over the difficult terrain in the region.

=== Soviet Invasion of Manchuria ===
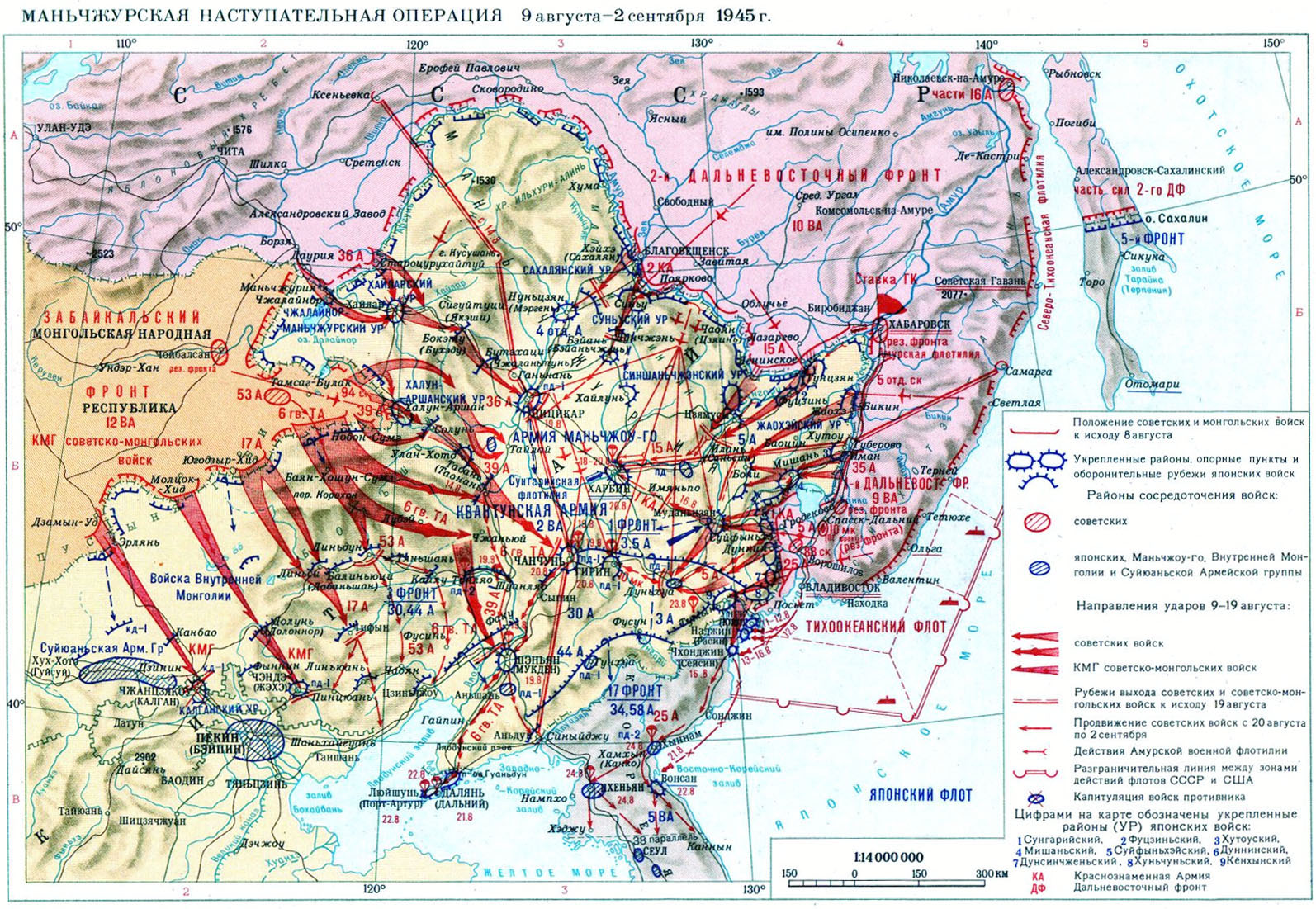
Soviet Invasion of Manchuria

At the beginning of August the 255th was still in 15th Army in Far Eastern Front. In preparation for the offensive against the Japanese in Manchuria the Front was split into 1st and 2nd Far Eastern Fronts, with 15th Army in the latter. The division was removed to the Front reserves, and was deployed to cover the city of Khabarovsk while providing a potential reserve for 15th Army. The area opposite the Army was defended by the Japanese 134th Infantry Division, based at Jiamusi. As the offensive proceeded so rapidly there was no need for the division to be committed before the campaign ended on August 20.

== Postwar ==
The 255th remained in service for nearly 10 more years. As of the beginning of January 1948 it was in the 137th Rifle Corps of the Far Eastern Military District, and it was still serving under those commands three years later. On April 18, 1955 it was reinforced with the 2150th Antiaircraft Artillery Regiment. At this time the division was in the 43rd Rifle Corps (former 137th) at Ust-Bolsheretsk, Kamchatka Krai, and by the end of the month it was redesignated as the 35th Rifle Division, which would be reorganized in May 1957 as the 125th Motorized Rifle Division of the 43rd Army Corps. The division was disbanded in 1958.

=== Postwar commanders ===
- Colonel Ivan Mikhailovich Gusev (February 10, 1949 – April 11, 1950)
- Colonel Anatolii Anisimovich Mironenko (April 11, 1950 – August 10, 1953)
- Colonel Afanasii Sergeyevich Pypyrev (August 10, 1953 – August 29, 1956, promoted major general August 8, 1955)
- Major General Dionisii Potapovich Tanasevsky (August 29, 1956 – March 7, 1958)
