= Teșcureni =

- Village
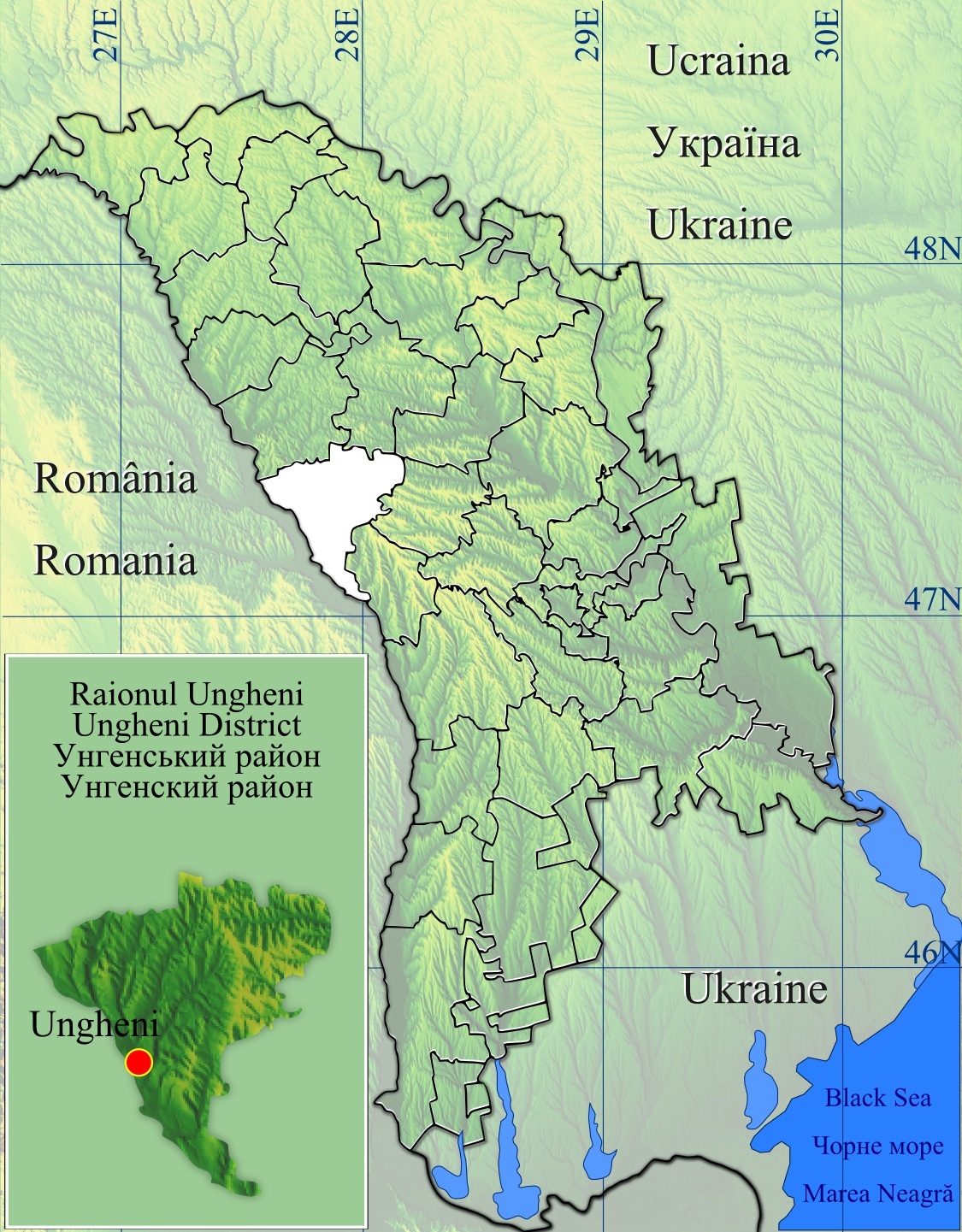
- Location within Ungheni
- Coordinates: 47°24′35″N 27°56′45″E
- Country: Moldova

Government
  - Mayor: Gheorghe Colțișor (PDM)

Population (2014 census)
  - Total: 1,006
- Time zone: UTC+2 (EET)
  - Summer (DST): UTC+3 (EEST)
- Postal code: MD-3648

Teșcureni is a village in Ungheni District, Moldova.
