= 293rd Rifle Division =

293rd Rifle Division (July 18, 1941 – January 21, 1943) 293rd Rifle Division (July 15, 1943 – 1946)
- Maj. Gen. Pavel Filippovich Lagutin, commander of the 1st formation of the 293rd Rifle Division
- Active: 1941–1946
- Country: Soviet Union
- Branch: Red Army
- Type: Infantry
- Size: Division
- Engagements: Operation Barbarossa; Battle of Kiev (1941); Kursk-Oboyan operation Second Battle of Kharkov; Case Blue; Battle of Stalingrad; Operation Uranus; Operation Ring; Soviet invasion of Manchuria
- Decorations: Order of the Red Banner (2nd Formation)

Commanders
- Notable commanders: Maj. Gen. Pavel Filippovich Lagutin; Col. Stepan Mikhailovich Sgibnev

The 293rd Rifle Division began service as a Red Army rifle division shortly after the German invasion. It was largely based on what would become the shtat (table of organization and equipment) of July 29, 1941. The division was initially assigned to 40th Army of Southwestern Front when that Army was formed on August 26. It served in several clashes with the German 2nd Panzer Group in the vicinity of Korop and was therefore outside the area encircled by 2nd and 1st Panzer Groups in September, spending the winter along the front near Kursk. It fought in the unsuccessful Soviet offensive on Kharkiv in May, 1942 as part of 21st Army, suffering significant casualties in the process. During June and July the remnants of the division fought along the Don River against the German summer offensive until it was pulled back into the Reserve of the Supreme High Command for rebuilding. It returned to the front in October, again as part of 21st Army, near Stalingrad, where it played a leading role in the encirclement and destruction of German 6th Army in January 1943, for which it was raised to Guards status as the 66th Guards Rifle Division as the battle was still ongoing.

A second 293rd Rifle Division was raised a few months later in Transbaikal Military District and remained in the Far East until August 1945 when it took part in the Soviet invasion of Manchuria as part of 36th Army in Transbaikal Front. In the course of this campaign it crossed the Greater Khingan Mountains was awarded the Order of the Red Banner for its role in the defeat of the Kwantung Army. It remained in the Far East until it was disbanded in 1946.

== 1st Formation ==
The 293rd Rifle Division, with an authorized strength of 10,911 men, began forming on July 18, 1941 at Sumy, composed of conscripts between ages 18 and 50 arriving from Kiev Oblast. Col. Pavel Lagutin would command the division throughout its 1st formation, being promoted to the rank of major general on December 27. In a report written after the division suffered heavy losses in September, Lagutin described its numerous shortcomings in manpower quality and equipment:

The 293rd Rifle Division began formation from 18 July 1941 in Sumy from contingents, arriving from Kiev Oblast, between the ages of 18 and 50. Among these 70 percent were without any military training and a high percentage unfit for military service due to their physical condition. During the period of formation, that is, from 18 July to 19 August, more than 20,000 men passed through the division and no more than 60 percent were selected to bring the division up to its authorized strength. The division command raised the question of manning the division with more suitable personnel. After this, the leftovers of earlier mobilized age groups, citizens of Sumy Oblast born from 1905 to 1918, were called up. The division was fully manned on 18 August. Among the rank and file twenty percent were completely untrained, 70 percent had a little training from different refresher trainings, and ten percent were trained. At all levels, 70 percent of the command personnel were called up from the reserve, of which the absolute majority had gone through reserve training at different times...

The armament of the division was received at the last moment. Rifles were received at the station while entraining for the front. The division received mortars, divisional guns, regimental and anti-tank artillery, and heavy machine guns two days before boarding troop trains, as a result, the division did not have the opportunity to properly familiarize its personnel with this equipment.

The division received old equipment, artillery, and heavy machine guns that received factory refurbishment, as a result of which they often broke down in battle: on the fourth day of the battle due to mechanical unreliability six regimental artillery guns and two 45 mm guns were out of order and sent to Sumy for repairs, in addition to four 122 mm howitzers, often out of order during battle.

Its order of battle, with numerous changes over time, was as follows:

- 1032nd Rifle Regiment
- 1034th Rifle Regiment
- 1036th Rifle Regiment
- 817th Artillery Regiment (until July 27, 1942; reestablished October 17)
- 331st Antitank Battalion (from October 17, 1942)
- 414th Antiaircraft Battery (later 576th Antiaircraft Battalion)
- 262nd Machine Gun Battalion (from October 17, 1942)
- 350th Reconnaissance Company
- 586th Sapper Battalion
- 571st Signal Battalion (until August 13, 1942); 243rd Signal Company (after August 13)
- 319th Medical/Sanitation Battalion
- 384th Chemical Defense (Anti-gas) Company
- 421st Auto Transport Company (later 721st)
- 27th Field Bakery (later 377th Auto Field Bakery)
- 645th Divisional Veterinary Hospital
- 973rd Field Postal Station
- 859th Field Office of the State Bank

The 293rd was almost immediately assigned to Southwestern Front to complete its formation. On August 18, it was assigned to 40th Army of that Front. The division began entraining at the Sumy station on 20 August, bound for the stations of Litynovka and Krolevets. While on the way, the division headquarters received orders from the front headquarters on 21 August, tasking it with the following missions:

Prepare the line along the southeastern bank of the Desna river in the sector of Pirogovka and Zhernovki for defense, covering the line of Shostka and Pirogovka from the north against a breakthrough by enemy tank groups, and be in readiness with the main forces of the division to cover the line between the mouth of the Seym and Raygorodok.

On 25 August, the 293rd took positions on the line of Shostka, Pirogovka, Timonovka, and Raygorodok, a frontage of 60 kilometers, and its additional mission of covering the Korop axis extended the front by another ten. German troops came up to the Desna on 26 August and the battle for the crossing in the Prigorodka region began. That evening German infantry and tanks with artillery support crossed in force, opposed by the 1034th Rifle Regiment, which lost roughly 50 killed and 100 wounded. Two 76 mm guns from the 817th Artillery Regiment were disabled, and six heavy machine guns crushed by tanks. The 1034th counterattacked on 27 August, driving the German troops back to the crossing, but could not dislodge them from their foothold on the Soviet side of the Desna. The 1034th lost more than 60 killed and roughly 130 wounded that day, while another 76 mm gun from the 817th and several heavy machine guns were lost. After briefly holding on, the regiment retreated towards Sobich late on 28 August in the face of what the Soviets estimated as two infantry regiments supported by twenty to thirty tanks. That day, the 1036th Rifle Regiment, covering the Shostka and Bogdanovka sector, came under tank attack from the Shostka direction, as Lagutin reported:

The tank attack was thrown back, and three enemy tanks destroyed, and on our side one 122 mm gun of the 817th Artillery Regiment was disabled, several horses put out of action and about twenty men killed and wounded.

== Battle of Kyiv ==
The Front commander, Col. Gen. M. P. Kirponos, issued his Operational Directive No. 00322 at 1600 hours on August 28, several hours after the Army made initial contact with German forces, in which he described its mission, in part:

3. 40th Army (293rd and 135th RDs, 10th [Tank Division], 2nd [Airborne Corps], and 5th [Antitank Brigade]), having occupied the Korop and Maloe Ust'e sector [30km west of Korop] with the units of 2nd AbnC, which are arriving by auto-transport, will continue to defend the Pirogovka Station and Stepanovka [from 50km northeast of Korop to 65km west-southwest of Korop] front along the southern bank of the Desna River.
The army's mission - prevent a penetration by the enemy along the Krolevets, Vorozhba and Konotop axes and firmly defend the right wing of the front against attacks by the enemy from the north.
Headquarters - Konotop.

Thus the Army, under command of Maj. Gen. K. P. Podlas, raised hurriedly, literally from scratch, was expected to defend a 115km-wide front with a paltry force of just over four divisions manned by roughly 50,000 men and about 40 tanks.

As his formations continued arriving in the Hlukhiv, Krolevets and Konotop region, Podlas committed them to action immediately, with orders to attack the lead elements of XXIV Motorized Corps' 10th Motorized and 3rd Panzer Divisions as they crossed the Desna. By the time they did, 3rd Panzer was well north of Novhorod-Siverskyi, and 10th Motorized had seized Korop. Ultimately, the 293rd engaged 3rd Panzer in the Shostka region. It was not a match for a full-blooded panzer division, and Podlas had no choice but to reinforce it as additional units arrived. 10th Tanks and later 5th Antitank moved to support of Lagutin's troops. Complicating Podlas' task was that while 40th Army was under Kirponos' command, it was actually wedged between Bryansk Front's 21st and 13th Armies. The obvious solution, to move 40th Army from one Front to the other, was rejected.

Later on August 28, Southwestern Front issued an operational summary describing 40th Army's dispositions and actions:

293rd RD is defending its previous positions. Over the course of 27 August, the division repelled attacks by the enemy who were operating toward Sobych' and Klishki [15 and 25km south of Novgorod-Severskii]. Eight enemy tanks were destroyed. In the Korop region, an enemy force of up to a company of infantry with three tankettes crossed to the left [southern] bank of the Desna River. Detachments of the division are fighting to destroy the enemy in this region.

Podlas focused his initial assaults against 3rd Panzer, and his report to the Front at 2200 hours on August 29 stated that the 293rd was fighting in the Pirogovka and Korop region. At 1500 a German force of up to a regiment of infantry with 15 tanks and tankettes (Red Army reports used this term for the Panzer I) attacked toward Altynovka. Podlas ordered forces of 10th Tanks, the 293rd, and 2nd Airborne to counterattack along this axis.

=== Roslavl-Novozybkov Offensive ===
The forces facing the 293rd were from 10th Motorized, which was pushing southward toward the Seym River. At 2200 hours on August 30, Southwestern Front reported that the division had repelled a counterattack against its right wing and held its previous positions south and southeast of Korop. The next day it launched a converging counterattack in cooperation with 135th Division and 2nd Airborne against the lead battle group of 10th Motorized. This led to it being encircled 12km south of the town and pressed the remainder of the 10th Motorized back to its outskirts. The battle group was forced to fight its way back to Korop by nightfall on September 1 at the cost of about 200 casualties. In his memoir Panzer Leader, H. Guderian noted:

The 10th (Motorized) Infantry Division succeeded in crossing the Desna, to the north of Korop, but was thrown back again to the west bank by heavy Russian counterattacks, besides being attacked on its right flank by strong enemy forces. By sending the very last men in the division, in this case the Field Bakery Company, a catastrophe to the right flank was just avoided.

Guderian turned to Army Group Center with an urgent request for reserves to restore the situation. At the end of this day the Front reported that the 293rd, now with the 28th NKVD Motorized Rifle Regiment attached, had gone over to the defense at 1800 hours with up to two regiments of German motorized infantry and a battalion of tanks facing it. In the fighting on 30–31 August, the 1034th Rifle Regiment, under heavy pressure from the Germans, lost up to 60 percent of its personnel, as well as more heavy weapons: another 76 mm gun from the 817th, three 45 mm guns, two 120 mm mortars, and about twelve heavy machine guns, as well as a significant quantity of other armament. Lagutin further described the fighting on 1 September:

The enemy went on the offensive along the entire front on the morning of 1 September with sizable forces, no less than 100–130 tanks and up to three regiments of infantry. The regiments repulsed the enemy attacks and held the line until 14:00. The enemy directed his strike from the direction of Voronezh-Glukhov and Bogdanovka through Chervonye Lozy and from Sobich against Leski, Gluboky Kolodets and towards Zabolotye, flanking the regiment on both sides. As a result of the battle our regiments suffered significant losses: no more than 30 percent of the men of the 1034th Rifle Regiment remained, and the 7th Company of the 1036th Rifle Regiment, covering the gap between the regiments, saddling the road from Sobich to Klishke to a rectangular grove 4 kilometers south of Sobich, was fully wiped out by mortar fire and tanks, it held the enemy until the beginning of the general retreat. By 14:00 on 1 September, the enemy flanked the regiments and split them, taking the northern outskirts of Zabolstye, the regiments were half-encircled, enemy tanks shot at our infantry from a range of 150 to 200 meters, tanks flanked the command post in Zabolotye from the east.

With the situation rapidly worsening, Lagutin ordered a retreat to the line of Klishki and Chepleyevka, but the advancing Germans captured these settlements before the 1034th and 1036th Regiments could reach them. In the retreat the 1034th lost most of its transport, fought in encirclement until 5 September, and broke into small groups that rejoined the division after 7 September. The 1036th came out of the fighting with 380 soldiers and a few heavy weapons remaining. Meanwhile, the division's third regiment, 1032nd had been fighting under the 10th Tank Division since 1 September, Lagutin having lost communication with it. Isolated in the Raygorodok and Zhernovka region, the regiment was routed on 5 September and retreated to the Seym in the Novoselye-Mutino region like the 1032nd and 1034th. Lagutin reported that many of the division's missing were locals who dispersed to their homes. After the retreat, the division counted 2,000 to 2,100 men at its disposal, pressing 500 men from the transport into the ranks. With this much-reduced force Lagutin sought to hold back the German advance in the Krolevets and Mutino region.

By September 5 the 40th Army was fighting with 10th Motorized and 4th Panzer Division along its entire front. The 293rd, still with 28th NKVD Regiment, after being attacked withdrew to the south bank of the Seym and concentrated in the Volchik region, 24-26km northeast of Konotop. Podlas now decided to make it the Army's reserve; it was to withdraw southward to put itself in order. However, Lagutin had lost communications with his 1032nd Rifle Regiment and its position was unknown. According to a report from Podlas' headquarters it was still in the Raigorodok and Zhernovka region, 9-12km northeast of Korop. In the event a detachment of 10th Tanks was sent to determine the regiment's location. The 293rd now also had the support of the 21st Gun Artillery Regiment.

In the second week of September the division was defending the towns of Krepali and Vorozhba from elements of XXIV Motorized Corps, but was soon retreating by way of Sumy to the vicinity of Konotop and Kursk, where it defended during the remainder of September. Throughout the autumn it defended along the Kursk–Stary Oskol axis and combat attrition would reduce its strength by November to less than 1,000 men. During December and again in January-February 1942 it took part in limited offensive action under 40th Army in the Kursk sector.

== Second Battle of Kharkiv ==
Following this, the division was assigned to the 21st Army, where it remained until August. Southwestern Front began regrouping its forces at the end of March. This was a complex process made more difficult by the arrival of the spring rasputitsa. 21st Army was under command of Lt. Gen. V. N. Gordov, and in the plan for the new offensive to liberate Kharkiv was designated to launch a supporting attack on the right flank of Southwestern Front. The 293rd would serve as part of Gordov's shock group, along with the 76th and 227th Rifle Divisions, supported by the 10th Tank Brigade plus the 338th Light, 538th Heavy, and 135th and 156th Artillery Regiments. The 293rd was in the center of the shock group and was located west of Vovchansk.

The offensive began at 0630 hours on May 12 with a 60-minute artillery preparation, during the last 15-20 minutes of which Soviet air attacks struck German artillery positions and strongpoints in the main defensive belt. The infantry and direct support tanks kicked off at 0730. While the 28th Army, to the south, was expected to make the greatest progress due to having the most armor support, in the event its attacks made minimal progress while 21st and 38th Armies made greater gains. All three divisions of the 21st Army's shock group forced crossings of the Northern Donets River; the 227th and 293rd penetrated the defensive belt and by the end of the day had captured Ohirtseve, Bugrovatka and Starytsya, having advanced 10km to the north and 6-8km to the northwest. The 293rd was unable to link up with the 76th to form one general bridgehead. The defending 294th Infantry Division took significant losses during the day.

On May 13, while the 293rd and 76th achieved their link-up they made little additional progress. The 227th, on the other hand, bypassed the German positions at Murom from the south, advanced as much as 12km with support of 10th Tank Brigade and captured a line from Hill 217 to Vysokii. The following day the 227th left one rifle battalion to hold Hill 217 as the 293rd attempted to take Murom through a frontal attack. By the end of the day, Gordov ordered Lagutin to envelop the town, blockade its garrison, and press on toward the northwest. Meanwhile, the right-flank forces of 38th Army were being counterattacked by the 3rd and 23rd Panzer Divisions out of Kharkiv.

As the German counteroffensive developed on May 15 the 21st Army's shock group and the north flank forces of 28th Army continued to press their attacks northeast of Kharkiv. Meeting increasing resistance, these were unsuccessful; in particular the newly-arriving 168th Infantry Division moved to stave off the loss of Murom. The next day the 21st Army commander, Lt. Gen. V. N. Gordov, was ordered to carry out his earlier assigned missions. Although Murom was now deeply outflanked and nearly encircled its garrison from the 168th Infantry continued to hold out.

By May 17 the 293rd had finally encircled Murom, while its forward detachments had advanced to Height 203.3, beating off counterattacks by the 168th Infantry in the process. However, Marshal S. K. Timoshenko, commander of Southwestern Direction, decided to halt further offensive activity by 21st Army in favor of redeploying the shock group to new positions running from Krasnaya Alekseeva to Pylnaya; this was largely due to ongoing pressure from the 168th Infantry. Also, by this time the 1st Panzer Army's attack against Southern Front's positions in the Izium–Barvinkove salient were well underway and Timoshenko's entire offensive was facing disaster. The 293rd came under further attack from the 168th Infantry on the afternoon of May 19 and forced back to the western outskirts of Murom, which had finally been cleared in the interim. Three Soviet armies were encircled in the Barvenkove salient by May 24 and soon destroyed. The 293rd escaped this fate, but had been significantly depleted during the offensive.

=== Operation Wilhelm ===
In the aftermath of the offensive the division was in much the same place as it had been at the start, west of Vovchansk in a bridgehead over the Northern Donets centered on Staryi Saltiv. As a preliminary to the main German summer offensive Gen. F. Paulus, commander of 6th Army, intended to eliminate the bridgehead in a pincer attack in order to gain crossing points over the Donets. Altogether the bridgehead contained seven rifle divisions, five from 28th Army plus the 76th and 293rd of 21st Army. All of these were understrength, backed by four weak tank brigades, three more rifle divisions and three cavalry divisions. The assault began early on June 10 and took the defenders by surprise. The four infantry divisions of VIII Army Corps took only two days to clear the bridgehead and capture Vovchansk. Meanwhile, the III Motorized Corps broke through the defenses of 38th Army to the south. Under the circumstances the 28th Army began retreating almost as soon as the German attack was underway. Rainy weather began on June 11 and this slowed the advance, along with defensive actions and counterattacks by the tank brigades. By the time the pincers closed on June 15 most of the Soviet forces had escaped, losing 24,800 men taken prisoner. On the same date the division's strength returns showed a total of just 1,374 men, with six field guns and three antitank guns.

== Case Blue ==
By the time the main German offensive began on June 28, Maj. Gen. A. I. Danilov had taken command of 21st Army. It was responsible for defending Southwestern Front's right (north) wing with seven rifle divisions, one motorized rifle brigade, and two rifle divisions in second echelon. It was deployed on a sector west of Stary and Novy Oskol opposite the bulk of German 6th Army. The German attack planned to collapse the 28th Army and drive it southward, after which the 21st and 40th Armies would be encircled and destroyed west of Voronezh. On June 30, after a 24 hour delay due to heavy rain, 6th Army unleashed its panzers. The STAVKA now faced a serious threat to the entire Southwestern Front. The assault by XXXX Panzer Corps tore a yawning gap 20km deep between 21st and 28th Armies, encircling two rifle divisions and a tank brigade on the former's left wing. Before long most of 6th Army was advancing northeast almost unimpeded toward Novy Oskol. The next day The German forces continued their headlong advance, straining to complete the further encirclement of the divisions of 21st and 40th Armies west of the Oskil River. Late in the day the STAVKA ordered the 21st, 28th and 40th Armies and their supporting tank corps to a new defense line along the Olym and Oskil Rivers; however, the withdrawal was chaotic at best. Danilov's forces began the retreat at dawn on July 2 but they had to run a gauntlet of near-constant artillery fire and airstrikes.

The escape became even more harrowing on July 3 as the German 6th and 2nd Armies closed in the Staryi Saltiv region, blocking most of the planned escape routes. By nightfall the 16th Motorized Division completed the encirclement. Unable to even slow 6th Army's advance, Danilov organized his remaining forces in small groups and ordered them to break out toward the Don and Tikhaya Sosna Rivers. In this process 21st Army lost more than half of its men and nearly all its remaining equipment, and it was no longer a viable combat force.

Following this disaster the 293rd offered resistance as best it could to the German summer offensive along the Don, and managed again to escape when four of the Army's divisions were cut off. The Army crossed to the east bank of the Don and in July became part of Stalingrad Front. Various divisional assets, such as the remaining guns of the 817th Artillery Regiment, were transferred to 76th Division while the divisional cadre entered the Reserve of the Supreme High Command's 4th Reserve Army at Buzuluk in the South Urals on August 4 for rebuilding over most of the next three months.

== Battle of Stalingrad ==
When this was complete in late October the division had a strength of 10,420 officers and men, less than 500 short of full complement at that period. Broken down by nationality, there were 4,523 Russians, 1,225 Ukrainians and Belorussians, 2,280 Kazakhs, 269 Jews, three men from the Baltic republics and one Chechen; the remaining troops came from several other Central Asian nationalities. Two-thirds of the officers and about 20 percent of the NCOs and men were members of the Communist Party or the Komsomol. Already on October 1 the STAVKA had directed that the 293rd was to be allocated to the newly formed Don Front, under command of Lt. Gen. K. K. Rokossovskii, along with six other rifle divisions from the Reserve. The division reentered the fighting front on October 17 with several new or renewed subunits, again as part of 21st Army. On October 22 the STAVKA decided to reform Southwestern Front, which had been disbanded following the summer disasters, effective October 31. The Front would be commanded by Lt. Gen. N. F. Vatutin and would include 21st Army.

=== Operation Uranus ===
Operation Uranus. Note positions of 21st Army.

In early November, the 293rd entered the Kletskaya bridgehead on the west bank of the Don in preparation for Operation Uranus. On the 14th, the 1034th Rifle Regiment staged a reconnaissance-in-force against the German and Romanian lines; at a cost of 106 dead and 277 wounded or shell-shocked, this attack uncovered the entire Axis fire plan in preparation for the main offensive which began on November 19.

21st Army was now under command of Lt. Gen. I. M. Chistyakov. Late on November 18 the riflemen, sappers and field gunners of the 76th, 293rd, and 63rd Rifle Divisions, accompanied by 56 KV tanks from the supporting 4th, 2nd and 1st Guards Heavy Tank Regiments, occupied jumping-off positions in a 12km-wide sector in a narrow bridgehead extending northwest from Kletskaya to the south bank of the Don; the 2nd Guards Tanks was allocated specifically to the 293rd. Because of the bridgehead's limited depth the artillery regiments of the three divisions remained in firing positions on the Don's north bank. The division was also supported by the 897th Artillery Regiment of 333rd Rifle Division, two gun artillery regiments, a mortar regiment, and a Guards mortar regiment.

Between 0848 and 0850 hours Moscow time on November 19, riflemen and sappers from the first echelon rifle divisions of 5th Tank, 21st, and Don Front's 65th Army commenced virtually simultaneous assaults against Romanian and German defenses from their bridgeheads. The assaulting troops wore white camouflage smocks to blend in with the snowy terrain. 21st and 65th Armies faced the German 376th Infantry Division plus the Romanian 3rd Army's 1st Cavalry, 13th Infantry and part of 6th Infantry Division. The 293rd made significant gains almost immediately. Exploiting the success of the neighboring 76th Division, which had shattered the entire right wing of 13th Infantry, Lagutin's riflemen surged forward up to 4km, penetrating the second Romanian position by noon. At this point Chistyakov decided to commit his powerful mobile forces.

The 4th Tank Corps and 3rd Guards Cavalry Corps entered the still-incomplete penetration by the 293rd and 76th Divisions in the early afternoon. By now, lead elements of the Romanian 15th Infantry Division were moving up to backstop the 13th Infantry. The 69th Tank Brigade, followed by the 45th Tank Brigade, passed through the advancing ranks of the 293rd with little difficulty, crushing the second line of 13th Infantry and then pushing rapidly toward the south and southwest. In the wake of the tanks the riflemen of the 76th and 293rd succeeded in advancing to positions 5 to 7km south of Kletskaya by days end. However, they missed the chance to encircle 15th Infantry's forces due to the failure of 27th Guards Rifle Division, on the left flank of 65th Army, to overcome the defenses of Romanian 1st Cavalry.

21st Army resumed operations early on November 20. The previous day, half of 4th Tank Corps had reached 35km south of Kletskaya and was overextended. Meanwhile, the 102nd Tank Brigade and 4th Motorized Brigade were fighting alongside the 293rd and 76th Divisions to dislodge the Romanian 15th Infantry and 1st Cavalry from their defenses at Gromki and along the Kurtlak River. By now the 333rd and 277th Rifle Divisions were moving up from second echelon to assist the 293rd. During the day the reinforced division, with the 63rd Division on the right, attacked 15th Infantry with two battalions of infantry and 35 to 40 T-34 tanks. After repelling several attacks, during which it reported destroying five tanks and capturing 45 prisoners, the 15th Infantry was forced to abandon Gromki and retreat to the west. After clearing the Kurtlak valley the 293rd seized Gromki, turned its sector over to the 333rd, and advanced into the region west of Evstratovskii on the Kurtlak by 1600 hours. The 293rd, 333rd and 63rd now formed the eastern pincer encircling the battered remnants of Romanian 3rd Army, now known as Group Lascăr.

==== Closing the Encirclement ====
On November 21, Chistyakov split his forces to accomplish the two missions he had been assigned. Leaving three divisions to encircle Group Lascăr from the east, he sent the 76th, 293rd and 277th Divisions southeast, along with his mobile forces, in a race to the Don. 4th Tank Corps brushed aside small groups of Romanian rear service troops and soon reached the Liska River. By 1600, despite efforts of a battle group from 24th Panzer Division, it had reached a point just 20km northwest of Kalach-na-Donu. Trailing behind, the 3rd Guards Cavalry reached Verkhne-Buzinovka where it got into a prolonged and inconclusive fight with 14th Panzer Division before deciding to leave a screening force behind to await the arrival of the 76th and 293rd in the region. During the day the 277th linked up with 5th Tank Army to complete the envelopment of Group Lascăr. Chistyakov was able to provide trucks to motorize one rifle regiment of each of the 76th and 293rd to speed their advance.

By the end of November 22 the two divisions had reached a line from Osinovka to Nizhne-Buzinovka to Sukhanovsky, from 10 to 18km behind the mobile forces and 20km ahead of the 277th. During the day all three divisions had been busy policing up Romanian troops that had been bypassed by the mobile group. The next day 4th Tank Corps rolled past Kalach toward Sovetsky after taking the bridge over the Don by a coup-de-main. Meanwhile, the 293rd continued its steady advance in the wake of 3rd Guards Cavalry, ending the day in the Malo-Golubinsky and Golubinsky regions on the west bank of the Don. Around 1600 hours the 4th Tanks met up with 4th Mechanized Corps of Stalingrad Front to complete the encirclement of 6th Army. On the same day the bulk of Group Lascăr surrendered.

The Soviet forces immediately began operations to reduce the pocket. For this, on November 24 Chistyakov would rely on his mobile forces, but these were far too spread out to be effective and the rifle divisions, including the 293rd, had still not come up. By nightfall it had closed into the Berezovsky and Kamensky sector, 5 to 15km north of Kalach. The next day, Chistyakov ordered the 26th Tank Corps, transferred from 5th Tank Army and supported by the 293rd, to capture the towns of Sokarevka and Peskovatka by the end of November 25. This would require an advance of up to 20km, which was well beyond the capability of a corps fielding no more than 40 tanks and, in fact, it failed. On November 26, one regiment of the division fought on the western outskirts of Illarionovsky against elements of 3rd Motorized Division, while the other regiments supported 4th Tank Corps fighting farther to the south. The Corps was now woefully understrength, and its effort to overcome further defenses of 3rd Motorized along the Vanyukova Balka, 15km east of Kalach, recorded virtually no progress.

By November 26, Vatutin was in the awkward position of trying to simultaneously direct the operations of 21st Army around the pocket as well as the remaining forces of the Front, which were continuing to exploit to the southwest. As a result, the STAVKA transferred the Army to Don Front, which would become responsible for the elimination of 6th Army. It faced the 3rd Motorized, 376th and 44th Infantry Divisions, plus battle groups from 14th and 16th Panzer Divisions, but by now the 4th and 26th Tank Corps were both worn down to brigade size. As a result the 293rd was now measuring its advances in hundreds, rather than thousands of metres. By November 29 it had taken Illarionovsky with the help of 4th Tanks.

=== Operation Ring ===
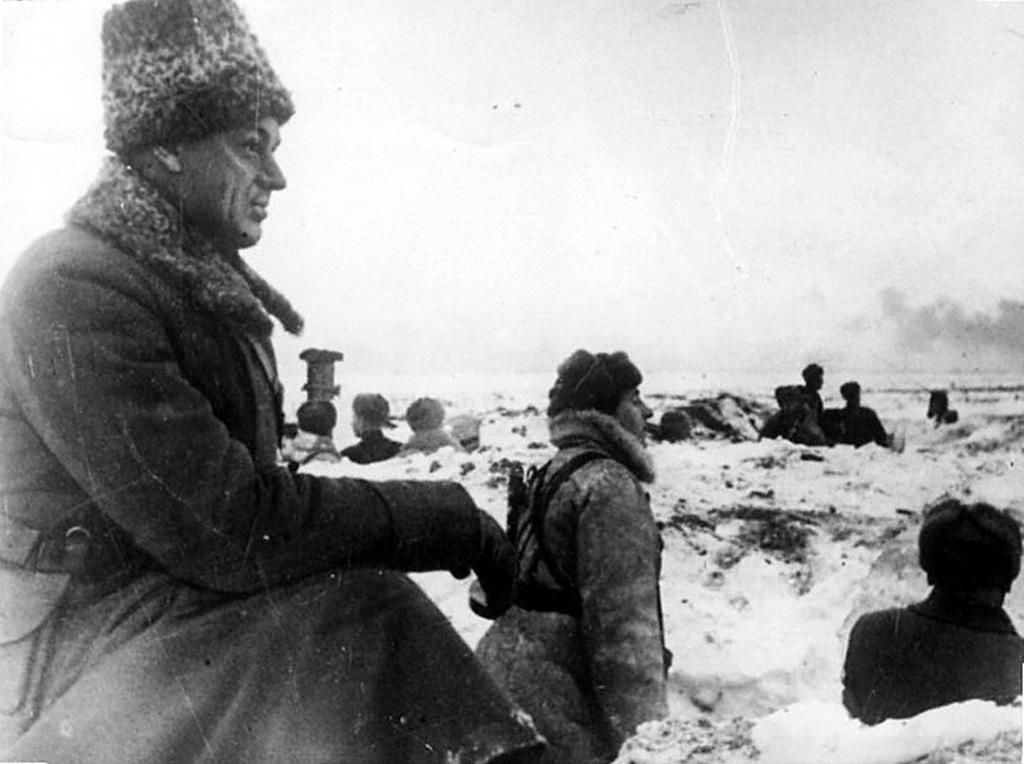
Lt. Gen. K. K. Rokossovskii near the Stalingrad pocket

Shortly after dawn on December 2 the 21st and 65th Armies, with two divisions from 24th Army, resumed their attacks along the western and northwestern fronts of the pocket. 3rd Motorized and 376th Infantry repulsed an attack by 96th, 293rd and 51st Guards Rifle Division (former 76th Rifle) and a combat group from 14th Motorized Rifle Brigade. The next day, on orders from Rokossovskii, the Front generally curtailed its operations for rest and replenishment but 21st Army conducted limited assaults at and north of Marinovka which were halted by counterattacks. Judging from reports by XIV Panzer Corps it was probably the 293rd and/or 51st Guards that struck the 29th Regiment of 3rd Motorized. While the defenders accounted for 18 Soviet tanks, 3rd Motorized lost 10, reducing its armor strength to 18 by nightfall.

The attack continued on December 4 when the 51st Guards assaulted Hill 129.0, supported on the right by the 293rd, which attacked the 376th Infantry's 672nd Regiment, anchored on Hill 131.7, about 7km southwest of Hill 129.0. It appears that the two divisions were supported by the KV tanks of 4th Guards Heavy Tank Regiment. In two days of intense fighting the 293rd captured its objective but then was halted about 1,000m beyond by counterattacks. 376th Infantry reported 200 Red Army dead and 20 prisoners of war over the two days. By now the 293rd was reduced to roughly 3,500 "bayonets" (riflemen and sappers); on the other side the 376th had been reduced to 3,800 men by December 3. During December 6-7, Don Front reported that its units defended their occupied positions and conducted reconnaissance.

Shortly after dawn on December 8 the Don and Stalingrad Front's armies around the pocket resumed offensive operations of some sort, but most of the attacks faltered almost immediately. An exception was 21st Army's assault on the Marinovka salient west of Karpovka. The 293rd and 51st Guards, with the former spearheaded by "units from 4th Tank Corps and 1st Guards Tank Corps," attacked southwestward from the sector between Hills 135.1 and 131.7, 11km northwest of Karpovka. Advancing southeastward about 6km, the 293rd repulsed counterattacks near Hill 94.9, 5km northwest of Karpovka, beginning at 1600 hours, and then fought in positions extending from Burial Mound +1.1, 4km northwest of Karpovka, to Hill 94.9. 51st Guards also made a successful penetration. This meant the two divisions with their supporting tanks controlled the entire Dubinina Balka, together with a rectangular swath of territory 2km wide stretching southeastward from 376th Infantry's old front lines east of Hill 135.1. They then faced counterattacks from tanks and infantry of 3rd Motorized but held the captured ground. In subsequent fighting through December 9-11 German forces struggled to contain and seal off this penetration, retaking Hill 135.1 on December 10, and the surviving infantry and tanks were forced to fall back to their original jumping-off positions.

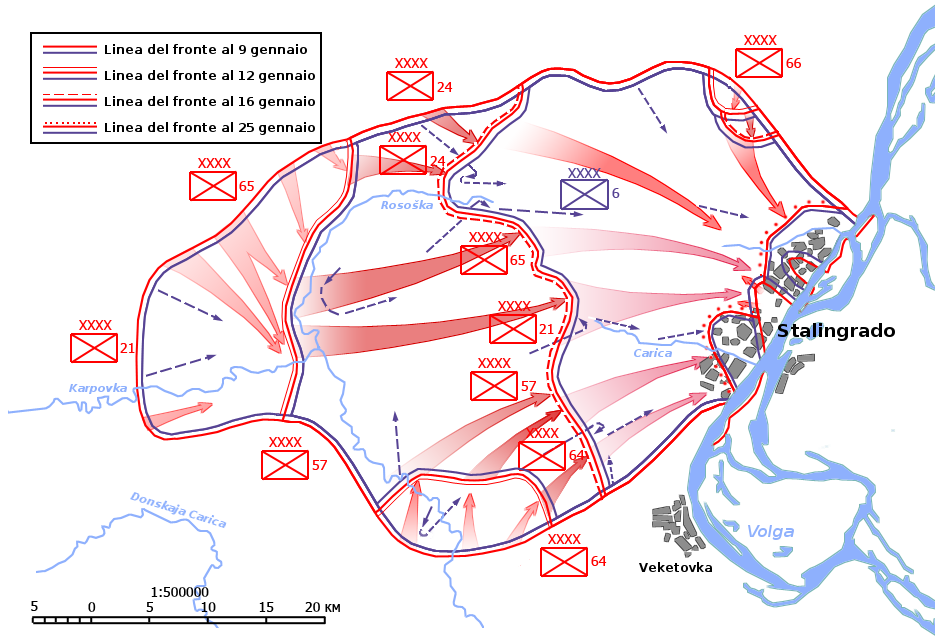
Operation Ring. Note advance of 21st Army.

A lull now fell across the front lines as both sides licked their wounds. The 376th Infantry, as one example, lost 15 men killed and 45 wounded on December 12. Rokossovskii was expecting the arrival of 2nd Guards Army but it was delayed and then deflected southward to deal with the German attempt to relieve 6th Army. As of December 16, the 293rd was holding a sector from near Hill 135.1 south to Hill 117.8, facing two battalions of 3rd Motorized and a part of the 29th Motorized Division. 6th Army now faced seven Soviet armies around its perimeter, four of Don Front and three of Stalingrad Front. Most of their divisions and brigades were at reduced strength. In terms of infantry they probably outnumbered the defenders by two-to-one, but the General Staff considered a three-to-one advantage necessary for success. This, in addition to the necessity of defeating the relief operations, led the STAVKA to postpone the start of the final offensive to crush the pocket, Operation Koltso (Ring), until January 10, 1943.

==== Eliminating the Pocket ====
The coordinator of the two Fronts, Col. Gen. of Artillery N. N. Voronov, had submitted his plan to the STAVKA on December 27. The 24th, 65th and 21st Armies of Don Front were to conduct the offensive's main attack on a 20km-wide sector on 6th Army's western front. At 0200 hours on December 30 all seven armies were consolidated into Don Front to improve command and control. On January 4, in a preliminary attack to improve their jumping-off positions, the 293rd and 277th Divisions struck German defenses on Hill 129.0 with battalion-sized assault groups. The attack was easily repulsed because the 29th Motorized's motorcycle and pioneer battalions had just taken over defense of the hill from two weak battalions of the 376th Infantry. On January 8, Rokossovskii issued an ultimatum to General Paulus to surrender his forces, but this was refused.

Operation Ring began with a 55-minute artillery preparation, followed by an infantry and armor assault at 0900 hours on January 10. Despite the destruction wrought on 6th Army's forward defenses, Soviet accounts of the battle praise the defenders for their "stubborn" initial resistance. 21st Army had again formed a shock group from the 293rd, 277th and 51st Guards, supported by 20 vehicles of 1st Guards Heavy Tanks, which savaged the right wing of the 29th Motorized. Striking on a 4km-wide sector from Hill 117.6 to Hill 131.7 in an effort to replicate its temporary success in early December, the shock group attacked in a dense single echelon formation, overwhelmed the defenders, and pushed east and southeast up to 3.5km, capturing Hill 129.0 and enveloping the villages of Poltavskii and Dmitrievka from three sides by day's end. XIV Panzer Corps managed to contain the attack short of the Rossoshka River only by shifting whatever reserves were available from 3rd Motorized to assist 29th Motorized. The rear of the former was again threatened.

Overnight, Paulus ordered 3rd Motorized to withdraw eastward from the Marinovka salient and take up new defenses. Simultaneously, all the forces freed up by this withdrawal were to shift northward to reinforce 29th Motorized. This was a risky maneuver covering up to 10km in bitter cold and deep snow, under heavy Soviet artillery and ground attacks. Meanwhile, Chistyakov regrouped his forces and urged them onward. By dawn on January 11 the salient had already shrunk in size by a third. The 293rd and 277th Divisions were to attack southward in the sector from Dmitrievka westward to Hill 131.7. They were facing the remnants of 29th Motorized's 71st Regiment plus four or five tanks and some 88mm guns in Dmitrievka proper. 6th Army reported that the 29th Motorized suffered heavy losses defending Poltavskii, Dmitrievka, and Otorvanovka and was unable to plug the gap between itself and VIII Army Corps. The report also indicates that many of the stay-behind units of 3rd Motorized were destroyed outright or captured before they could withdraw. The 51st Guards and 173rd Rifle Divisions pressed forward overnight, shattering 29th Motorized's already fragmented defenses and significantly narrowing the corridor at the base of the salient through which the survivors of the two German divisions were trying to escape.

By nightfall on January 12 the 21st Army had fulfilled most of its first day missions. 65th Army committed its fresh 252nd Rifle Division from second echelon, which cut off 29th Motorized's withdrawal across the Rossoshka. The 293rd, which had seized Dmitrievka and Otorvanovka the day before, drove southward up to 4km and then swung southwestward to establish blocking positions facing west along the northern two-thirds of the Dmitrievka–Karpovka road. Rokossovskii then issued orders for his armies to continue the offensive on the 13th. 21st Army, supported on the left by 65th Army, was to capture Karpovka, cross the Rossoshka and Karpovka Rivers, seize Pitomnik Airfield, and link up with 57th Army's forces in the vicinity of Voroponovo Station. When this was complete the 21st would have eight rifle divisions, including the 293rd, deployed in a single echelon, backed by significant tank and artillery assets transferred from 65th and 24th Armies. During the day the division was one of four that destroyed or captured the remnants of 29th and 3rd Motorized encircled west and southwest of Karpovka. With this completed, it moved eastward with the 52nd Guards and 298th Rifle Divisions to take up jumping-off positions along the Rossoshka by late on January 14.

Rokossovskii was promoted to the rank of colonel general on January 15, and his Don Front began its general offensive shortly after dawn as the remaining German forces were still en route to their final defensive positions. 21st Army lunged eastward to within 3km of Pitomnik Airfield, utterly demolishing was little was left of the 29th and 3rd Motorized, and the 376th Infantry. The 293rd, with the 298th, liberated the village of Pitomnik, 3-4km south of the airfield, on January 16. Gumrak was now the only operational airfield for supplies within the pocket. The next day Chistyakov concentrated nine rifle divisions for the offensive, with seven Guards heavy tank regiments, two artillery divisions, and many other assets in support. His Army was to advance along the Gumrak and Krasnyi Oktyabr village axis to cut 6th Army into two parts. With planning completed, the Front rested, replenished, and refitted its forces from January 18-21, while continuing local operations to improve attack positions.

In one such effort on January 19 the 293rd and 298th Divisions struck VIII Corps defenses at and south of Gonchara, but without success. The final stage of Ring was not supposed to kick off until 1000 hours on January 22, but in the event it began in earnest on the 21st. 24th, 65th and 21st Armies conducted what amounted to a strong reconnaissance-in-force against the entire northwestern corner of 6th Army's defenses. 52nd Guards and the 293rd advanced east between Gonchara and the railway line, capturing Hill 126.1, 5km west-southwest of Gumrak. In the process they assisted in the final dismantling of 44th Infantry Division, and seriously damaged 76th Infantry Division. That evening, Stalin's Order No. 34 was received:

Fighting for our Soviet Motherland against the German invaders, the 293rd Rifle Division proved to be a model of bravery, courage, discipline and order. Engaged in continuous combat... the division inflicted heavy casualties on the Fascist forces and with its shattering blows destroyed enemy manpower and equipment, mercilessly crushing the German invaders... For the courage demonstrated in fighting for the Fatherland, the 293rd Rifle Division is to be reorganized into the 66th Guards Rifle Division.

In April, 21st Army would be reorganized as the 6th Guards Army. Lagutin soon left the 66th Guards to become deputy commander of the Army. During the Belgorod–Kharkov offensive operation he briefly led the 23rd Guards Rifle Corps. He was wounded in November and did not return to his previous post until April 1944. He would be promoted to the rank of lieutenant general on September 13 of that year. In July 1945 he was sent to the Far East and became the deputy commander of 25th Army, serving during the Soviet invasion of Manchuria. He retired due to illness in 1953 and died in Moscow in 1975.

== 2nd Formation ==
The second 293rd Rifle Division was formed at Chita, one of six new divisions formed in the Transbaikal Military District in mid-July, 1943. Col. Stepan Sgibnev was appointed to command on July 15, and he would remain in this post for the duration of the war. The division's order of battle was as follows:

- 1032nd Rifle Regiment
- 1034th Rifle Regiment
- 1036th Rifle Regiment
- 817th Artillery Regiment
- 487th Self-Propelled Artillery Battalion (during 1945)
- 331st Antitank Battalion
- 350th Reconnaissance Company
- 586th Sapper Battalion
- 571st Signal Battalion (until November 27, 1944); 243rd Signal Company (after November 27)
- 319th Medical/Sanitation Battalion
- 384th Chemical Defense (Anti-gas) Company
- 421st Auto Transport Company
- 27th Field Bakery
- 645th Divisional Veterinary Hospital
- 2856th Field Postal Station
- 1858th Field Office of the State Bank

The division spent most of the remainder of the war in the 2nd Rifle Corps in the Transbaikal Front reserves. The 487th Self-Propelled Artillery Battalion, consisting of 20 SU-76s and one T-70 command vehicle, was added in 1945 in common with many other rifle divisions in the Far East as a means of adding mobile firepower that could cope with the near-roadless terrain. During June it left 2nd Corps to become a separate division, still in the Front reserves. In preparation for the Soviet invasion of Manchuria, the 293rd left its base at Chita on the night of July 8/9 and marched to its concentration area near Railroad Siding No. 84 – Mat (Mother) mountain, where it joined 36th Army of the same front for the duration.

=== Soviet invasion of Manchuria ===
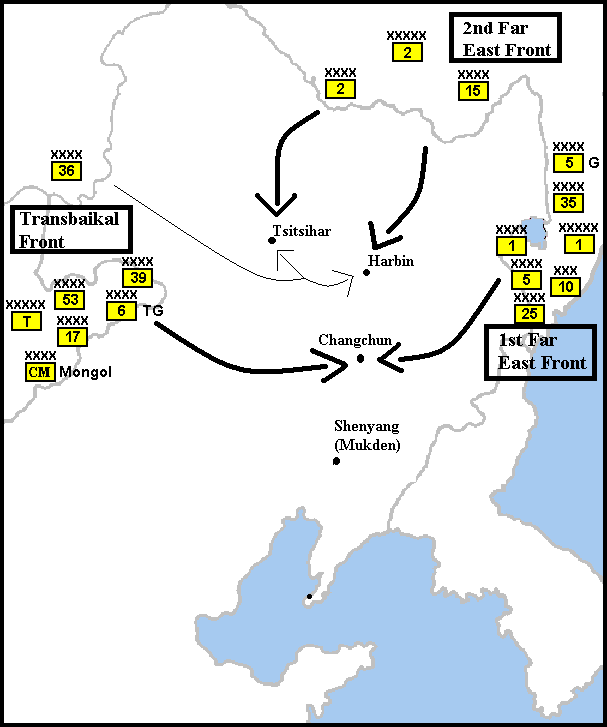
Soviet invasion of Manchuria. Note position and movement of 36th Army.

In the plan for the operation the 36th Army was to attack from Duroy and Staro-Tsurukaytuy across the Argun River in order to secure Hailar by the tenth day of the operation and to prevent a Japanese withdrawal through the Greater Khingan mountains from northwestern Manchuria. Because of rough terrain and lack of contact between the two Fronts, the Far East Command drew no demarcation line to separate Transbaikal Front from 2nd Far Eastern Front on its left.

When the Soviet Union declared war on Japan on August 9 the 293rd joined in the advance into Manchuria as part of Lt. Gen. S. S. Fomenko's Manzhouli Operational Group. Overwhelming the under-manned Japanese fixed fortifications at Chalainor-Manzhouli on the first day, the 293rd advanced through the desert, eliminating small Japanese groups from the Jalainur-Manzhouli Fortified Region in its path. Moving along the route of Lake Dalainur to the rail siding of Ogomor, its units reached the region south of Nantun by the end of August 15. On the night of August 16/17 the division relieved elements of the 94th Rifle Division and fought for the Hailar Fortified Region. It reported losses of 12 killed and 15 wounded on August 16. Capturing the fortified region, from August 19 the division marched along the Hailar-Qiqihar route and by August 30 was at Zalantun. From there, it was ordered to return to Hailar, where it arrived on September 9.

In recognition of this success, specifically the crossing of the Greater Khingans, the division was awarded the Order of the Red Banner on September 20. Later in the year it was transferred to 17th Army, and it was disbanded along with this Army during the spring and summer of 1946.

== In popular culture ==
Mansur Abdulin's memoir Red Road from Stalingrad (ISBN 1-84415-145-X) is based on his experiences fighting as an ordinary soldier in the 293rd (and later the 66th Guards) at Stalingrad and afterwards. It was published in Russian in 1991 and in English in 2004.
