= Stepan Sgibnev =

Stepan Mikhailovich Sgibnev
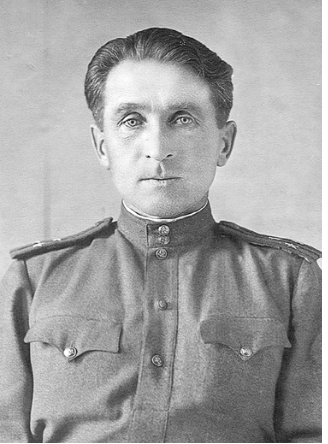
- Sgibnev during World War II
- Born: 19 December 1898; Zavarzino, Tomsk Governorate, Russian Empire
- Died: April 1987 (aged 88) Tomsk, Soviet Union
- Allegiance: Russian Empire; Soviet Union
- Branch: Imperial Russian Army; Red Guards; Red Army
- Service years: 1917; 1917–1918; 1919–1955
- Rank: General-mayor
- Commands: 293rd Rifle Division
- Conflicts: World War I; Russian Civil War; World War II
- Awards: Order of Lenin

Stepan Mikhailovich Sgibnev (Russian: Степан Михайлович Сгибнев; 19 December 1898 – April 1987) was a Soviet Army general-mayor who held divisional command during World War II.

A Red Guard during the Russian Civil War, Sgibnev was imprisoned and forcibly mobilized by the Whites in Siberia and ended the war with a Red partisan detachment. He rose through command positions in the interwar Red Army, and spent much of World War II in the Transbaikal region. Sgibnev commanded the 293rd Rifle Division during the Soviet invasion of Manchuria, and continued to hold senior positions in the postwar army until his career ended in the mid-1950s.

== Early life, World War I and Russian Civil War ==
Stepan Mikhailovich Sgibnev was born in a large peasant family on 19 December 1898 in the village of Zavarzino, Tomsk Okrug, Tomsk Governorate. His father died of tuberculusis when he was four years old. He worked in Tomsk as an assistant in the meat shops of local merchants. During World War I, Sgibnev was mobilized for military service on 13 January 1917 and sent to the training detachment of the 18th Siberian Reserve Rifle Regiment at Tomsk. Not having completed training, he was sent home in August and September for field work and did not return to the unit. On arrival to his home village, Sgibnev joined a druzhina of the Red Guards formed in Zavarzino.

In early 1918, the druzhina was assigned to the 1st Red Guards Regiment at Tomsk. In late May he took part in the elimination of anti-Soviet unrest in Tomsk. After the flight from the city of the Tomsk Soviet of Deputies and the Red Guard headquarters, Sgibnev and other Red Guards were arrested by the Whites on 31 May and imprisoned in the Tomsk Central Prison. In late December he was mobilized from the prison into the army of Kolchak and sent to the 46th Siberian Rifle Reserve Regiment. In June 1919 he was sent to Tyumen with a march company. From there, Sgibnev deserted and returned to his home village, but was returned to service by a detail from the 46th Siberian Reserve Rifle Regiment and sent back with a march company. In late September and early October he was among the leaders of an anti-Kolchak uprising in the regiment and then with the partisan detachment formed under the command of Iosif Khabarov operated in the region of Novokuskovo and Molchanovo. When Red Army units arrived in January 1920 the detachment was redesignated the Railroad Guard Detachment of the 5th Army, and Sgibnev confirmed as a company commander in it.

== Interwar period ==
After the disbandment of the detachment in June 1920, Sgibnev was appointed a company commander in the 1st Engineer Reserve Brigade at Tomsk and that month sent to complete the 2nd Siberian General Education Course for Command Personnel. After graduation in October 1921, he was sent to the Sport and Gymnastics Course for Military Training Establishments of Siberia at Omsk. After completing the course, Sgibnev was appointed a gymnastics instructor at the 25th Tomsk Infantry School in August 1922. For command training, he was sent to the Tomsk Infantry School in April 1924, with the school being transferred to Omsk and renamed the Omsk Infantry School. After graduating from the school on 8 August 1925, he was sent to command a platoon of the 1st Pacific Rifle Division’s 1st Chita Rifle Regiment at Nikolsk-Ussuriysky. In December 1927 Sgibnev was transferred to command a course at the Vladivostok Infantry School, and in October 1928 became a company commander in the Siberian Military District’s 6th Territorial Reserve Regiment. Seconded to the 62nd Novosibirsk Rifle Regiment in May 1929, he was appointed chief of its scout detachment after its relocation from Yurga to Chita in August.

Sgibnev returned to the Omsk Infantry School in October, serving as a course commander and acting chief of ammunition supply. He was transferred to the 35th Tatarsk Rifle Regiment of the Siberian Military District's 12th Rifle Division in February 1932, serving as assistant commander and commander of a battalion. From April 1933 he served as an instructor, and then assistant chief of the training department and rifle and machine gun instructor at the Tomsk Artillery School. In July 1940, Sgibnev, by then a major, was appointed chief of the Biysk Improvement Course for Reserve Command Personnel, and in February 1941 rose to chief of the 1st Section of the district Combat Training Department. Sgibnev was promoted to command the 9th Rifle Regiment of the 94th Rifle Division of the Transbaikal Military District in April.

== World War II ==
After Germany invaded the Soviet Union, Sgibnev continued to command the regiment. He rose to chief of staff of the 94th Rifle Division in March 1942. In June 1943 he took command of the 226th Separate Rifle Brigade of the Transbaikal Front’s 36th Army. Soon afterwards, on 15 July, Sgibnev became commander of the 293rd Rifle Division, forming at Chita. In preparation for the Soviet invasion of Manchuria, his division left its base at Chita on the night of 8–9 July 1945 and marched to its concentration area near Railroad Siding No. 84 – Mat (Mother) mountain, where it was assigned to the 36th Army by 27 July. After the invasion began on 9 August, the 293rd, operating as part of the Manzhouli Operational Group commanded by Sergey Fomenko, crossed the border and attacked the Slyapa-Kharanor cordon. Subsequently, conducting a march maneuver through the waterless desert, it wiped out small Japanese groups from the Jalainur-Manzhouli Fortified Region in its path. Moving along the route of Lake Dalainur to the rail siding of Ogomor, its units reached the region south of Nantun by the end of 15 August. On the next day the division relieved elements of the 94th Rifle Division and fought for the Hailar Fortified Region. Capturing the latter, from 19 August the division marched along the Hailar-Qiqihar route and by 28 August concentrated in the region of Yuitszyavopen. Then it was ordered to return to Hailar, where it arrived on 9 September. For its performance, the division received the Order of the Red Banner on 20 September, while Sgibnev was promoted to major general on 8 September.

For his performance in the operation, Fomenko recommended Sgibnev for the Order of Suvorov, 2nd class, awarded on 31 August. The recommendation read:

The 293rd Rifle Division, under the command of Colonel Comrade Sgibnev, conducted a march from Chita, crossing the border, to Hailar, conducting minor combat operations to destroy small groups of the enemy. In the city of Hailar the division fulfilled the main mission to destroy the Hailar Fortified Region. During the entire period of combat operations and on the march the division displayed high cohesion and organization in operations. Comrade Sgibnev is a competent, strong-willed commander, having fully coped with the leadership of the division, and is worthy of the state award of the Order of Suvorov, 2nd class.

== Postwar ==
After the end of the war, Sgibnev continued to command the division. After completing the Higher Academic Courses at the Voroshilov Higher Military Academy between March 1946 and February 1947, he was placed at the disposal of the General Staff's Directorate for External Relations, sent to Yugoslavia as senior military adviser to the 2nd Yugoslav Army at Zagreb. On his return to the Soviet Union in April 1948, Sgibnev was appointed deputy commander of the 18th Guards Rifle Corps at Omsk. He rose to assistant commander of the West Siberian Military District for military training establishments in November 1949. Placed at the disposal of the 10th Department of the 2nd Main Directorate of the General Staff in March 1951, he was then sent on a long-term posting. Placed at the disposal of the Main Cadre Directorate in October 1954, Sgibnev was transferred to the reserve in January 1955. He died in April 1987 at Tomsk.

== Awards ==
Sgibnev was a recipient of the following decorations:

- Order of Lenin
- Order of the Red Banner (2)
- Order of Suvorov, 2nd class
