= Fortified district =

WWII Soviet defensive construction

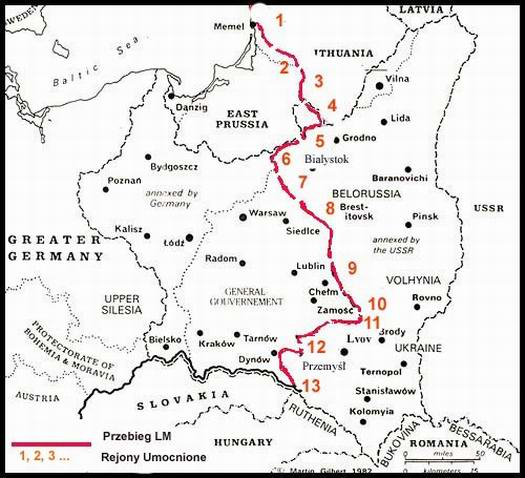
The Molotov Line system of fortified districts. Legend: 1. Telšiai, 2. Šiauliai, 3. Kaunas, 4. Alytus,5. Grodno, 6. Osowiec, 7. Zambrów, 8. Brest, 9. Kovel, 10. Volodymyr-Volynskyi, 11. Kamianka-Buzka, 12. Rava-Ruska, 13. Przemyśl

A fortified district or fortified region (Russian: Укреплённый район, Укрепрайон, ukreplyonny raion, ukrepraion) in the military terminology of the Soviet Union, is a territory within which a complex system of defense fortifications was engineered.

Each fortified district consisted of a large number of concrete bunkers (pillboxes) armed with machineguns, antitank guns and artillery. The bunkers were built in groups for mutual support, each group forming a centre of resistance. The area in between was filled with various barriers and obstacles, as well as mine fields. A dedicated military unit (Fortified district troops) was permanently assigned to man each region.

The concept of ukrepraions was developed during the Russian Civil War, when large territories were to be defended by relatively sparse military force. The first military units named so appeared in 1923.

In 1928 the program for the construction of the comprehensive system of fortified districts was launched. It started with 13 fortified districts, which over time evolved into the Stalin Line.

== Field Fortified Regions ==
Beginning in early 1942, long after the fortified lines in the west had fallen, the Red Army began organizing a somewhat different sort of unit, also known as a "Field" Fortified Region (District). These were brigade-sized in terms of manpower (apx. 4,500 men), with anywhere between four and eight machine gun - artillery battalions, a signal company, a medium mortar company, and other supporting units. They were not tied to any fortified line and had some, mostly horse-drawn, mobility, so are sometimes referred to as "field" units, as opposed to the pre-war units, which were static.

"Strong in artillery and machine guns and weak in riflemen, the fortified region was used as an economy of force minor formation for purely defensive tasks such as the holding of passive sectors or the flank of a penetration."

In effect, as Soviet production of heavy weapons vastly increased in the middle part of the war, while manpower was hard put to keep pace, the men of the fortified regions were almost entirely trained as heavy weapon crews, in order to hold ground by firepower rather than by manpower. This was a very practical solution, given that so much of the Soviet-German front was impracticable for offensive action by either side.

The new field fortified regions were most extensively employed during Operation Koltso. Don Front was outnumbered by the German forces of 4th Panzer and 6th Armies, but those armies were in no position to attack to break the siege due to lack of supplies. Don Front employed six field fortified regions, 54th, 115th, 156th, 77th, 118th, and 159th, to protect and cover wide swaths of the encirclement front, enabling the field armies of the Front to concentrate the bulk of their combat forces in narrow, carefully selected main attack sectors. This use of fortified regions in an economy of force role proved so successful that the Red Army routinely employed them in the same fashion, but on an even larger scale, for the remainder of the war.

== After World War II ==
Of the 47 fortified regions in the Red Army at the end of World War II, more than 30 were used to form machine gun artillery brigades and the rest were disbanded. By the 1950s the fortified regions in the Far East had been disbanded, and only a few remained in the Transcaucasus and Karelia, using different TO&Es from the World War II units (see http://www.ww2.dk/new/army/other/ur.htm). As Sino-Soviet tensions increased during the 1960s, the Soviet Army began to create new fortified regions to provide security in the Far East.

The first two, the 97th and 114th, were formed in March 1966 to protect the Transbaikal railways. Each included three motor rifle battalions with four companies each, four tank battalions with four companies equipped with T-34-85, IS-2, IS-3, IS-4, T-54/T-55, and OT-55 tanks. The units also included a separate machine gun artillery battalion of six companies, two of which were equipped with ten OT-55 and IS-4, and separate sapper, communications, repair and recovery battalions, as well as an anti-tank battalion with 18 85 mm guns and a rocket artillery battery with 4 BM-13 Katyusha units.

By the late 1980s, ten fortified regions were located in the Primorsky and Amur regions, five in the Transbaikal, one in Kazakhstan, and four on the Turkish border. The organization of each fortified region differed according to the needs of their respective military districts. However, each fortified region generally included between three and five separate machine gun artillery battalions (with some additionally including a motor rifle battalion), a tank battalion and between one and three battalions or companies of tank turrets dug in as pillboxes, one to three artillery battalions or separate batteries (including rocket and anti-tank), an anti-aircraft rocket battalion or battery, a separate communications battalion or company, an engineer-sapper battalion, company, or platoon, and support and maintenance units.

The machine gun artillery battalions of the fortified regions differed little in their organization, usually consisting of two machine gun companies, a motor rifle company, and a mortar battery. Depending on their location, they could also consist of a company of tank turrets dug in as pillboxes, two or three artillery caponiers, and a ZPU-2 anti-aircraft gun platoon. Machine gun companies consisted of three platoons each armed with six PK and PKS 12.7 mm machine guns, the 12.7 mm NSV heavy machine gun, the AGS-17 automatic grenade launcher, and the SPG-9 anti-tank grenade launcher.

The motor rifle units of the fortified regions had a similar structure to other motor rifle units and were mostly equipped with ZIL-131 and GAZ-66 trucks. The tank battalions numbered 31 tanks, generally T-54s or T-55s and sometimes including OT-55 flamethrower tanks. Separate rocket battalions were equipped with 18 BM-21 Grad or BM-13 systems, six per battery; anti-tank batteries were equipped with six 100 mm MT-12 anti-tank guns. During the fall and winter of 1989, during the reorganization of the Soviet Army, most of the fortified regions were reorganized into machine gun artillery regiments of newly created machine gun artillery divisions.

== List of fortified regions ==
=== Interwar period ===
- Arkhangelsk Fortified Region – Formed on 15 February 1940 from the operational group of units of the Arkhangelsk garrison for the protection of the White Sea coast during the Winter War, which was itself created by an order of 22 December 1939. Disbanded on 25 August and its personnel transferred to other Arkhangelsk Military District units.
- Blagoveshchensk Fortified Region – By an order of the Special Red Banner Far Eastern Army of 18 March 1932, the 4th Chief Directorate of Construction Work for the construction of fortifications to defend the left bank of the Amur River was created. The fortified region became part of the army on 31 October of that year, and on 5 July 1939 it became part of the 2nd Red Banner Army.
- De-Kastri Fortified Region – Began construction based on an order of 7 March 1933 in the village of De-Kastri, Primorsky Krai. Subordinate to the commander of the naval forces in the Far East, transferred to Special Red Banner Far Eastern Army in January 1934 and 2nd Red Banner Army in September 1938.
- Grodekovo Fortified Region – Construction led by 102nd Chief Directorate of Construction Work in the area of Grodekovo and Sergeyevka, Primorsky District. Fortified region was part of the Special Red Banner Far Eastern Army.
- Grodno Fortified Region – Created by an order of 22 June 1940, part of the Belorussian Special Military District. On 8 July a joint command for the Grodno and Polotsk Fortified Regions was created. On 3 September the latter was disbanded and its personnel joined the Grodno Fortified Region.
- Lower Amur Fortified Region – Began construction based on an order of 7 March 1933 in the city of Nikolayevsk-on-Amur. Subordinate to the Special Red Banner Far Eastern Army from March 1933 and the 2nd Red Banner Army from September 1938.
- Mozyr Fortified Region – Formed in September 1931 as Pripyat PVO sector, became 34th Chief Directorate of Construction Work in October 1933. Subordinated to 23rd Rifle Corps when the latter established in August 1936, part of the Belorussian Military District.
- Novograd-Volynsky Fortified Region – Created by a Ukrainian Military District order in February 1932, construction supervised by the 99th Chief Directorate of Construction Work. Reorganized into 45th Rifle Division headquarters fall 1935 and fortified region subordinated to the division. When division left for western Ukraine in September 1939, fortified region became independent, with its own headquarters. Renamed 7th Fortified Region by Kiev Special Military District order of 6 September 1940.
- Poltavka Fortified Region – Formed 17 January 1934 with headquarters at Poltavka, Primorsky Krai. Headquarters of the 2nd Priamur Rifle Division used to form headquarters. Initially part of Special Red Banner Far Eastern Army, transferred to 1st Red Banner Army in September 1938.
- Transbaikal Fortified Region – Created by orders in April 1932, construction supervised by 107th Chief Directorate of Construction Work. Part of the Special Red Banner Far Eastern Army, its headquarters was at the 79th Railway Siding named for Molotov and the settlement of Dauriya from July 1940.
- Ust-Sungari Fortified Region – Formed by Special Red Banner Far Eastern Army order on 25 January 1932, headquarters at Leninskoye on the Amur. Transferred to 2nd Red Banner Army in September 1938.

=== Post-World War II ===
- 1st Fortified Region – Formed on 13 May 1970 as the Vladivostok Fortified Region, providing coast defense for the main base of the Pacific Fleet. Headquartered at Slavyanka and reorganized as 1st Fortified Region 1 January 1978. Disbanded 25 November 1995.
- 2nd Fortified Region – Formed May 1970, covered Bolshoy Ussuriysky and Tarabov Islands (disputed with PRC). Part of 15th Army, headquartered at Khabarovsk. Structure remained almost unchanged until disbanded in 2008.
- 3rd Fortified Region – Part of the 43rd Army Corps, headquartered at Leninskoye. Redesignated 63rd Machine Gun Artillery Regiment of 128th Machine Gun Artillery Division in December 1989.
- 4th Fortified Region – Part of the 5th Red Banner Army at Kraskino. Redesignated 196th Machine Gun Artillery Regiment of 129th Guards Machine Gun Artillery Division in October 1989.
- 5th Fortified Region – Part of the 5th Red Banner Army at Popovka. Disbanded 1993.
- 6th Fortified Region – Originally formed as 78th Fortified Region in April 1942, fought in World War II. Part of the 31st Army Corps at Akhaltsikhe.
- 7th Fortified Region – Originally formed as 55th Fortified Region at Leninakan on 4 February 1941, covered Turkish border during World War II. Part of the 7th Guards Army during the late 1980s.
- 8th Fortified Region – Originally formed as 51st Fortified Region at Akhalkalaki (later transferred to Batumi) on 5 January 1941, covered Turkish border during World War II. Part of the 31st Army Corps during the late 1980s.
- 9th Fortified Region – Originally formed as 69th Fortified Region at Kazan in April 1942. Fought in Battle for the Caucasus and later transferred to Echmiadzin as part of the 45th Army. Part of the 7th Guards Army during the late 1980s.
- 10th Fortified Region – Part of the 32nd Army with headquarters at Chundzha. Headquarters was a cadre unit and subordinate battalions were directly subordinated to 32nd Army and 17th Army Corps.
- 11th Fortified Region – Formed 31 December 1975 at Dosatuy as the cadre fortified region of the 38th Guards Motor Rifle Division. Expanded to full strength on 14 February 1979. Redesignated 298th Machine Gun Artillery Regiment of the 131st Guards Machine Gun Artillery Division on 1 October 1989.
- 12th Fortified Region – Part of the 35th Army at Blagoveshchensk. Redesignated 57th Machine Gun Artillery Regiment of the 126th Machine Gun Artillery Division in 1989.
- 13th Fortified Region – Part of the 5th Red Banner Army at Pogranichny. Redesignated 105th Machine Gun Artillery Regiment of the 129th Guards Machine Gun Artillery Division in December 1989.
- 14th Fortified Region – Redesignated during the early 1970s from the 114th Fortified Region, formed in March 1966 at Sherlovaya Gora. Redesignated 363rd Machine Gun Artillery Regiment of the 122nd Guards Machine Gun Artillery Division in 1989.
- 15th Fortified Region – Began forming 5 March 1966, covered Novogeorgievka as part of the 5th Red Banner Army. Redesignated 114th Machine Gun Artillery Regiment of the 127th Machine Gun Artillery Division on 19 October 1989.
- 16th Fortified Region – Redesignated during the early 1970s from the 97th Fortified Region, formed in March 1966 at Bilyutuy. Redesignated 383rd Machine Gun Artillery Regiment of the 122nd Guards Machine Gun Artillery Division in 1989.
- 17th Fortified Region – Part of the 45th Army Corps, 15th Army, and 5th Red Banner Army. Covered Chinese border at Dalnerechensk. Redesignated 365th Machine Gun Artillery Regiment of the 130th Machine Gun Artillery Division in 1989.
- 18th Fortified Region – Part of the 36th Army at Krasnokamensk. Redesignated 363rd Machine Gun Artillery Regiment of the 122nd Guards Machine Gun Artillery Division in 1989.
- 19th Fortified Region – Part of the 36th Army at Dauriya. Redesignated 363rd Machine Gun Artillery Regiment of the 122nd Guards Machine Gun Artillery Division in 1989.
- 20th Fortified Region – Part of the 5th Red Banner Army at Barabash. Redesignated 250th Machine Gun Artillery Regiment of the 129th Guards Machine Gun Artillery Division on 11 December 1989.
