= Alexander Luchinsky =

Soviet Army officer

Alexander Alexandrovich Luchinsky
- Luchinsky, c. 1960
- Born: 23 March [O.S. 10 March] 1900; Kiev, Russian Empire
- Died: 25 December 1990 (aged 90) Moscow, Soviet Union
- Buried: Novodevichy Cemetery
- Allegiance: Russian SFSR; Soviet Union
- Branch: Red Army (later Soviet Army)
- Service years: 1919–1964
- Rank: Army general
- Commands: 3rd Mountain Rifle Corps; 28th Army; 36th Army; 4th Army; 3rd Shock Army; Leningrad Military District; Turkestan Military District
- Conflicts: Russian Civil War; Basmachi revolt; World War II
- Awards: Hero of the Soviet Union; See awards

Alexander Alexandrovich Luchinsky (Russian: Александр Александрович Лучинский; 23 March [O.S. 10 March] 1900 – 25 December 1990) was an Army General of the Soviet Army and a Hero of the Soviet Union.

The son of an army officer, Luchinsky was educated at a cadet corps and joined the Red Army during the Russian Civil War. He served as a cavalry platoon commander and served in Central Asia during the 1920s and 1930s, holding command and staff positions. After returning from a stint in China during the Second Sino-Japanese War, Luchinsky became commander of the 83rd Mountain Rifle Division, which he led in the Anglo-Soviet invasion of Iran and the Battle of the Caucasus. He commanded the 3rd Mountain Rifle Corps in 1943 and early 1944, and was wounded in the Crimean Offensive. After recovering, Luchinsky rose to command the 28th Army, which he led in Operation Bagration, the East Prussian Offensive, and the Berlin Offensive, being made a Hero of the Soviet Union for his performance in the East Prussian Offensive. After the end of the war in Europe, Luchinsky commanded the 36th Army in the Soviet invasion of Manchuria. Postwar, he led army and military district commands, ending his career as first deputy chief inspector of the Ministry of Defense.

== Early life and Russian Civil War ==
Luchinsky was born on 23 March 1900 in Kiev, the son of an Imperial Russian Army officer, and studied at the Volsk Cadet Corps from September 1912. During World War I, his father commanded a regiment on the Southwestern Front. The cadet corps was converted into a gymnasium in January 1918 after the October Revolution and a month later became a boarding school. That month, Luchinsky graduated from seven grades and went to his mother in Saratov, where in April he passed an external examination for a realschule. Continuing his education, Luchinsky became a student of the physics and mathematics faculty at Saratov University in September.

Luchinsky joined the Red Army on 15 January 1919 and was sent to the Saratov Workers' Regiment, later transferring to the 1st Bukhara Partisan Detachment and fighting as a Red Army man on the Southeastern Front. From May he commanded a platoon of the separate communications company of the Saratov Brigade, and from August was a cavalry platoon and squadron commander with the 1st Brigade of the 50th Taman Rifle Division. During this period, he fought in battles against the White forces of Alexander Kolchak near Uralsk and Lbishchensk and from September against the Armed Forces of South Russia at Tsaritsyn. He participated in the capture of Tsaritsyn and the capture of the left and upper Volga from the Don Army, the defeat of the 1st Kuban Infantry Corps at Peschanokopskoye and Beloglinsky, the Battle of Yegorlykskaya and the capture of Tikhoretsk, and the defeat of the Armed Forces of South Russia in the Tuapse area. From May 1920, he commanded a platoon of the 83rd Brigade of the 28th Rifle Division, which in the same month relocated from Derbent to Baku. The division moved to Lenkoran in October, suppressing banditry in Transcaucasia.

== Interwar period ==
After the end of the war, Luchinsky served on the Turkestan Front from January 1922 as a Red Army man with the 80th Cavalry Regiment of the 14th Maykop Cavalry Division. He became a junior commander and platoon commander of the same unit in July, and in June 1923 transferred to the 6th Cavalry Regiment of the 2nd Separate Turkestan Cavalry Brigade, serving as a platoon commander. From November 1924 he served as a platoon commander, assistant squadron commander, and acting chief of the regimental school with the 84th Cavalry Regiment. After becoming adjutant of the 8th Horse Artillery Battalion in November 1926, Luchinsky returned to the 84th Cavalry Regiment of the 8th Brigade of the Central Asian Military District, serving as the regimental quartermaster, a squadron commander, and as chief of the regimental school in Tashauz. In 1927 he graduated from the Combined Central Asian Military School in Tashkent, after which he fought against the forces of Junaid Khan in Khiva, being awarded the Order of the Red Banner in 1929 and the Order of the Red Banner of Labor of the Uzbek SSR on 11 September 1928. After completing the Novocherkassk Cavalry Commanders' Improvement Courses between October 1929 and June 1930, Luchinsky returned to the regiment as a squadron commander.

After serving as chief of the regimental school of the 83rd Mountain Cavalry Regiment from January 1932, Luchinsky became chief of staff of the 1st and later the 2nd Turkmen Regiment from May 1933. Having commanded the 48th Mountain Cavalry Regiment since November 1936, Luchinsky served as an advisor in China between 1937 and 1938 and was awarded a second Order of the Red Banner on 19 October 1938 for his actions. Returning to the Soviet Union, he became chairman of the 21st Remount Commission in September 1938 and chief of the 1st section of the 2nd staff department of the Central Asian Military District in October 1939. By then a colonel, he commanded the 470th Rifle Regiment of the 194th Rifle Division from May 1940, and in November of that year became chief of staff of the 83rd Mountain Rifle Division in Ashgabat. In the same year, he graduated from the distance learning faculty of the Frunze Military Academy. Luchinsky became commander of the division in April 1941.

== World War II ==
After the beginning of Operation Barbarossa, the division was mobilized and fought in the Anglo-Soviet invasion of Iran, during which it occupied Mashhad and disarmed the Iranian 8th Eastern Division. Luchinsky commanded it in the Battle of the Caucasus from November 1942, and for his courage was awarded the Order of Lenin on 1 April 1943. Promoted to major general on 31 March 1943, he became commander of the 3rd Mountain Rifle Corps of the North Caucasian Front on 25 April, fighting in the defeat of Axis troops on the Taman Peninsula. Wounded in action in Crimea on 10 March 1944, Luchinsky stayed with his troops until the accomplishment of his unit's objectives before being evacuated to a hospital. After recovering, he returned to command of the corps on 17 April, and was appointed commander of the 28th Army of the 1st Belorussian Front on 20 May. A promotion to lieutenant general followed four days later.

Luchinsky led the 28th Army in Operation Bagration, in which it broke through German defenses in the Parichi sector and crossed the Western Bug near Brest, then fought on Polish territory. The army was withdrawn to the Reserve of the Supreme High Command in September before being transferred to the 3rd Belorussian Front in mid-October, fighting in the Gumbinnen Operation. Entering into battle from the second echelon of the front, the army broke through German border defenses and captured Stalluponen on 25 October. During the East Prussian Offensive between January and March 1945, the army broke through German defenses and reached the central part of East Prussia, reaching the Baltic coast southwest of Königsberg and encircling the German troops in the city. For his leadership of the army in the East Prussian Offensive, Luchinsky was awarded the title Hero of the Soviet Union and the Order of Lenin on 19 April. After the fall of Königsberg, the army was withdrawn to the Reserve of the Supreme High Command on 1 April and on 20 April joined the 1st Ukrainian Front, with which it ended the war in the Berlin and Prague Offensives. In the latter, the 28th, in conjunction with the 52nd Army, attacked from the Niesky area towards Zittau and Česká Lípa and approached Prague from the northeast, accepting the surrender of surrounded German troops. For "skillful command," Luchinsky received the Order of Suvorov, 1st class on 23 July 1944 and 29 May 1945 and the Order of Kutuzov, 1st class, on 16 May 1945.

Luchinsky was sent to the Far East in June 1945 to command the 36th Army of the Transbaikal Front in the Soviet invasion of Manchuria. During the Khingan–Mukden Offensive, the army attacked from the area of Dauriya towards Hailar to cover the actions of the main strike group from the north. Beginning the offensive on the night of 9 August, the army formation captured the Jalainur and Manzhouli fortified regions, forced the Argun River, captured the city of Hailar. Continuing the offensive, elements of the army blockaded the Hailar fortified region while the main forces advanced further into Manchuria. Crossing the Greater Khingan mountains, the army captured Zalantun on 17 August and on 19 August its vanguard captured Qiqihar, after which the army disarmed Kwantung Army units.

== Postwar ==
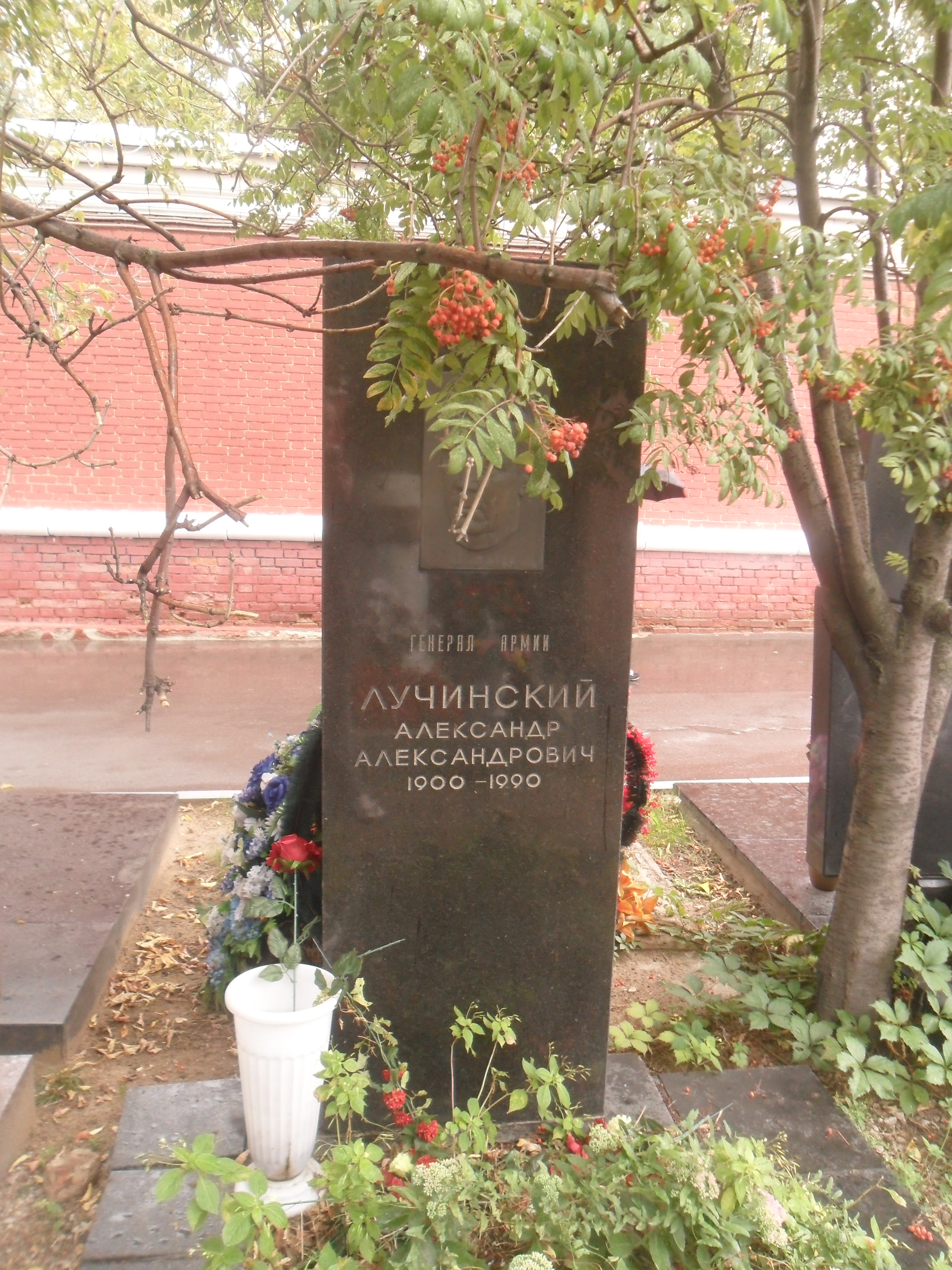
Luchinsky's grave at Novodevichy Cemetery

After the end of the war, Luchinsky, promoted to colonel general on 8 September, commanded the 4th Army from 20 December 1945. After completing the Higher Academic Courses at the Voroshilov Higher Military Academy between February 1947 and May 1948, Luchinsky became commander of the 3rd Shock Army of the Group of Soviet Occupation Forces in Germany. Serving as deputy commander-in-chief of the group from 11 April 1949, he was appointed commander of the Leningrad Military District in September of that year. After transferring to command the Turkestan Military District in May 1953, Luchinsky, promoted to the rank of army general on 8 August 1955, became first deputy chief inspector of the Ministry of Defense in April 1958, and between 12 February and 13 March 1959 temporarily served as chief inspector of the ministry. His duties included monitoring the combat training of troops, and from 29 September 1964 he served as an inspector of the Group of Inspectors General of the Ministry of Defense, a retirement post for senior officers. Luchinsky was deputy head of the group between January 1969 and 29 March 1986. He died on 25 December 1990 and was buried at the Novodevichy Cemetery.

== Awards and honors ==
Luchinsky was a recipient of the following awards and decorations:

- Hero of the Soviet Union
- Order of Lenin (3)
- Order of the October Revolution
- Order of the Red Banner (4)
- Order of Suvorov, 1st class (3)
- Order of Kutuzov, 1st class
- Order of Suvorov, 2nd class
- Order of the Patriotic War, 1st class
- Order of the Red Star
- Order "For Service to the Homeland in the Armed Forces of the USSR" 2nd and 3rd classes
- Order of the Red Banner of Labour of the Uzbek SSR
- Medals
- Four foreign orders and three medals

He was a delegate of the 2nd, 3rd, and 4th convocations of the Supreme Soviet of the Soviet Union and a candidate member of the Central Committee of the Communist Party of the Soviet Union between 1952 and 1961.
