= Beloglinsky =

Beloglinsky (Russian: Белогли́нский; masculine), Beloglinskaya (Белогли́нская; feminine), or Beloglinskoye (Белогли́нское; neuter) is the name of several rural localities in Russia:

- Beloglinsky (rural locality), a settlement in Krepinsky Selsoviet of Kalachyovsky District of Volgograd Oblast
- Beloglinskoye, a selo in Tersky District of the Kabardino-Balkar Republic
