= Sergey Fomenko =

Sergey Stepanovich Fomenko
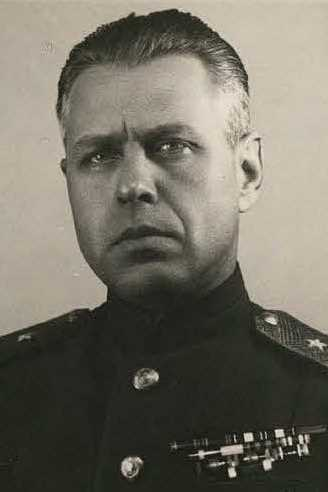
- Fomenko, postwar
- Born: 7 October 1902; Shpola, Kiev Governorate, Russian Empire
- Died: 28 October 1991 (aged 89) Simferopol, Soviet Union
- Allegiance: Soviet Union
- Branch: Red Army
- Service years: 1918–1957
- Rank: General-leytenant
- Commands: 83rd Mountain Rifle Division; Transbaikal Military District; 36th Army; Taurida Military District
- Conflicts: Russian Civil War; World War II; Manchurian Operation
- Awards: Order of Lenin (2)

Sergey Stepanovich Fomenko (7 October 1902 – 28 October 1991) was a Soviet Army general-leytenant who held field army command during World War II.

A veteran of the Russian Civil War, Fomenko rose through command and staff positions in the interwar Red Army and was deputy commander of the Transbaikal Military District when Germany invaded the Soviet Union. Fomenko remained in the Transbaikal region during the war, commanding the 36th Army. He led an operational group of the army while serving as army deputy commander during the Soviet invasion of Manchuria. Postwar, Fomenko continued to hold senior positions, ending his career as first deputy commander of the Northern Group of Forces in the late 1950s.

== Early life and prewar service ==
A Ukrainian, Sergey Stepanovich Fomenko was born on 7 October 1902 in the town of Shpola, Kiev Governorate. He joined the Red Army in 1918, fighting in the Russian Civil War on the Southern Front in Ukraine against Whites and Ukrainian nationalists as a Red Army man. He graduated from the 27th Oryol Infantry and Machine Gun Command Course in 1921, and the Course for Chiefs of Machine Gun Detachments at the Higher Rifle-Tactical School in 1922. Fomenko became a member of the Communist Party in 1924. After the end of the war, Fomenko served as a platoon commander, company commander, chief of a regimental machine gun detachment, assistant battalion commander, chief of a regimental school, and battalion commander at the Odessa Infantry School.

In January 1933 he became commander of the 15th Turkestan Mountain Rifle Regiment of the 4th Turkestan Mountain Rifle Division of the Central Asian Military District. In June 1935 he became chief of the special section of the District Central Asian Military School. On 21 July 1937 he took command of the 83rd Mountain Rifle Division of the Central Asian Military District. He was promoted to the rank of kombrig on 17 February 1938, and in July of that year appointed deputy commander of the Transbaikal Military District. Fomenko was promoted to the rank of komdiv on 4 November 1939 and received the rank of general-mayor when the Red Army introduced general officer ranks on 4 June 1940. In 1941, he graduated from the Improvement Courses for Higher Command Personnel.

== World War II ==
Fomenko was acting commander of the Transbaikal Military District between 23 and 27 June 1941, and took command of the new 36th Army in July. Fomenko's army prepared reserves for the troops on the Eastern Front, while training to break through fortifications and fight in mountain and taiga conditions. His army was quickly drawn down due to the need for troops on the Eastern Front, being reduced from four rifle divisions to just one division by the end of 1941. At the same time, the army was placed on constant combat readiness to repulse a feared Japanese attack. Fomenko was promoted to the rank of general-leytenant on 16 October 1943. In January 1944, Transbaikal Front deputy commander Dmitry Kozlov recommended Fomenko for the Order of Lenin for his leadership of the army, which was awarded on 25 January. The recommendation read:

He commands the troops of the army confidently and skillfully. During his time in this position from 1941 he has acquired experience and practice. He is a general prepared in operational and tactical aspects. He treats service with interest and desire. He is with the troops a significant amount, concretely leading them and rendering practical assistance. The units and formations of the army in the fall inspections displayed a high level of combat training. He is a strong-willed, demanding and authoritative commander. He is ideologically firm and morally steadfast, loyal to the party and Homeland.

On the eve of the Soviet invasion of Manchuria Alexander Luchinsky arrived to command the 36th Army, and Fomenko became army deputy commander. He was given command of the right (western) flank of the 36th Army, consisting of the 293rd and 298th Rifle Divisions supported by two machine gun artillery brigades. This force was designated the Manzhouli Operational Group. During the invasion, Fomenko's troops took the stations of Manzhouli and Jalainur on 11 and 12 August, inflicting over 500 Japanese casualties. Fomenko's group pursued the remnants of the Japanese defenders, retreating towards Tsagan station and Hailar. The operational group surrounded Hailar from the west and took part in the elimination of Japanese resistance in the Hailar fortified region, as well as the capture of Qiqihar. For his performance in command of the Manzhouli Operational Group, army commander Alexander Luchinsky recommended Fomenko for the Order of Kutuzov, 1st class, downgraded to the Order of Suvorov, 2nd class and awarded on 8 September 1945. The recommendation read:

General-leytenant Fomenko, during the battles with the Japanese, commanded an operational group of the troops of the army on the Manzhouli axis. On 9 August 1945, the troops of the operational group broke through the long-term enemy defense with a large presence of pillboxes: the Manzhouli-Jalainur Fortified Region, and with a rapid offensive took the cities of: Manzhouli, Jalainur, and pursued the retreating enemy along the railroad to Hailar.

On reaching the Hailar region, the troops of the operational group fought to eliminate the blockaded garrisons in the Hailar Fortified Region. In a short period the elimination of strong enemy centers of resistance was completed, wiping out more than 100 pillboxes and taking 3,880 enemy soldiers and officers prisoner.

General-leytenant Fomenko, leading the fighting of the group, was directly with the combat formations of the advancing units, displaying an example of courage and heroism.

For self-sacrificing leadership of the combat operations of the troops, he is deserving of the award of the Order of Kutuzov, 1st class.

== Postwar ==
Postwar, Fomenko resumed command of the 36th Army on 28 November 1945, which he led until its disbandment in June 1948. After completing the Higher Academic Course at the Voroshilov Higher Military Academy in 1949, he rose to assistant commander of the Transbaikal Military District in April of that year, before transferring west in September 1953 to serve as first deputy commander of the Taurida Military District. He served as acting district commander between July and September 1954. Fomenko transferred to serve as first deputy commander of the Northern Group of Forces in Poland in July 1956 before being retired in 1957. He died on 28 October 1991 in Simferopol.

== Awards ==
Fomenko was a recipient of the following decorations:

- Order of Lenin (2)
- Order of the Red Banner (3)
- Order of Suvorov, 2nd class
- Order of the Patriotic War, 1st class
- Order of the Red Star
