= 293rd Division =

293rd Division may refer to:

- 293rd Infantry Division, Wehrmacht, Germany
- 293rd Rifle Division, Soviet Union

== See also ==
- List of military divisions by number
