= 36th Army (Soviet Union) =

Soviet Army formation

- 36-я армия
- Active: 1st formation: 1 August 1941 – July 1948; 2nd formation: 1976 – 1989
- Country: Soviet Union
- Branch: Red Army (Soviet Army from 1946)
- Type: Combined arms
- Size: Field Army
- Engagements: Invasion of Manchuria

Commanders
- Notable commanders: Alexander Luchinsky

The 36th Army (Russian: 36-я армия) was a military formation of the Red Army and the Soviet Ground Forces, formed twice.

Formed in mid-1941, the army spent much of World War II as part of the Transbaikal Military District guarding the Manchurian and Mongolian-Soviet borders. During the Soviet invasion of Manchuria in August 1945, the army advanced over the Greater Khingan mountains and overran the Japanese Hailar fortified region in fierce fighting. It was disbanded after the end of the war in mid-1948.

The army was reformed in 1976 from the 86th Army Corps, which had been itself established in 1968 as a result of rising Sino-Soviet tensions. It garrisoned the Transbaikal until being reduced to the 55th Army Corps in 1989 as the Cold War ended.

== First formation ==
=== Garrison duty in the Transbaikal ===
The army was formed in July 1941 in the Transbaikal Military District from the 12th Rifle Corps, under the command of Major General Sergey Fomenko, promoted to lieutenant general on 16 October 1943. It initially included the 65th, 93rd, 94th, and 114th Rifle Divisions as well as the 31st and 32nd Fortified Regions, supported by a number of artillery units, among others. The army became part of the Transbaikal Front in September when the latter was created from the district, and for the rest of World War II guarded the Manchurian-Soviet and Mongolian-Soviet borders in the Transbaikal.

=== Soviet invasion of Manchuria ===
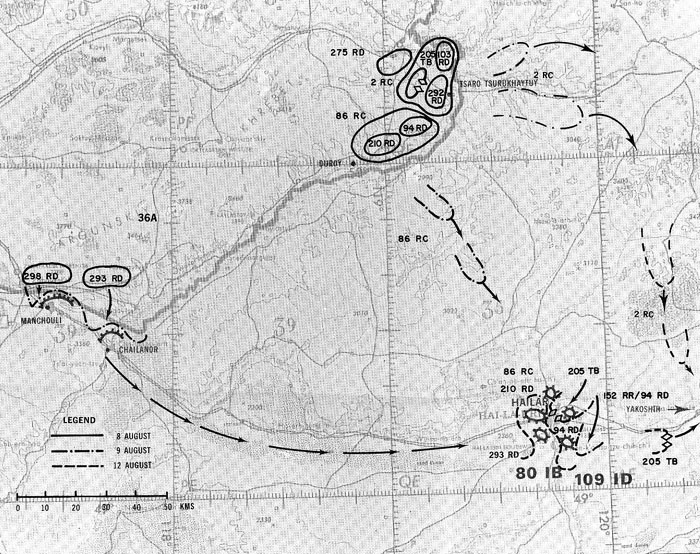
Advance of the 36th Army between 8 and 12 August 1945

For the August 1945 Soviet invasion of Manchuria, the army included the 2nd and 86th Rifle Corps, the 293rd and 298th Rifle Divisions, the 31st and 32nd Fortified Regions, and tank, artillery, and other units. As part of the Khingan–Mukden Offensive Operation, the army was tasked with an advance from the Dauriya area and positions northeast of Duroy to Hailar in order to secure the attack of the main force of the Transbaikal Front against a Japanese counterattack from the north. To expedite the advance of the army a mobile group consisting of the 205th Tank Brigade, rifle regiments aboard vehicles, artillery and anti-aircraft artillery regiments, self-propelled artillery and missile launcher battalions as well as sapper companies was formed. Beginning their attack on the night of 9 August without artillery or aerial bombardment, the forces of the army swiftly overran Japanese covering units, captured the Jalainur-Manchuria fortified region on the right flank, and crossed the Argun River on the left flank to advance on Hailar. An advance of 40 kilometers was reached by the end of the day.

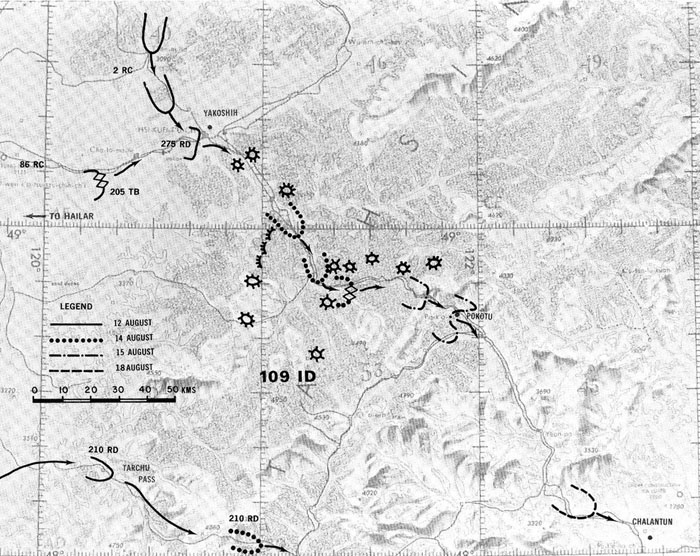
Advance of the 36th Army between 12 and 18 August 1945

Continuing the rapid offensive, the forces of the army surrounded the Hailar fortified region on the second day of the invasion and its main forces advanced deep into Manchuria. After crossing the Greater Khingan, on 17 August they captured Boketu, Yalu, and Zalantun. As the vanguard of the 205th Tank Brigade moved towards Qiqihar, which was reached on 19 August, elements of the army continued the reduction of the Hailar fortified region, which fell on 18 August. Following the surrender of the Kwantung Army, the troops of the army helped disarm Japanese troops.

=== Postwar ===
The army became part of the Transbaikal-Amur Military District when the front headquarters became a military district on 10 September. By 1 October, it included the 2nd Rifle Corps with the 103rd, 275th, and 292nd Rifle Divisions, the 86th Rifle Corps with the 94th, 210th, and the 298th Rifle Divisions, and the 293rd Rifle Division and 31st and 32nd Fortified Regions directly subordinated to the army headquarters. The headquarters of the 2nd Rifle Corps, and the 103rd and 275th Divisions were quickly disbanded as part of the postwar demobilization. The demobilization continued in early to mid-1946, during which the 210th, 292nd, 293rd, and the 298th Divisions were disbanded. As a result, the army was reduced to the 86th Rifle Corps with the 36th and 94th Rifle Divisions and the 57th Rifle Division, 61st Tank Division, and the 3rd and 8th Machine Gun Artillery Brigades by August of that year.

Headquartered at Chita by May 1947, the army headquarters was used to reform the Transbaikal Military District headquarters there on 10 July. Simultaneously, the 86th Rifle Corps headquarters became a new army headquarters at Tsugol. The existence of this formation was brief, and in accordance with an order of 24 March 1948 the army headquarters was disbanded by July and used to help form the 14th Assault Army in the Chukotka Peninsula. The 86th Rifle Corps and 61st Tank Division were directly subordinated to the district.

=== Commanders ===
The following officers commanded the army:

- Major General Sergey Fomenko (promoted to lieutenant general 16 October 1943; 27 July 1941 – June 1945)
- Lieutenant General Alexander Luchinsky (promoted to colonel general 8 September 1945; June–September 1945)
- Lieutenant General Sergey Fomenko (September 1945 – 1948)

== Second formation ==
Major unit headquarters locations in the late 1980s

The second formation of the 36th Army was originally formed as the 86th Army Corps of the Transbaikal Military District at Borzya on 19 April 1968, as a result of the Sino-Soviet split. The numbering of the corps was a reference to the 86th Rifle Corps, in an attempt to continue traditions. The corps included the 122nd Guards Motor Rifle Division at Dauriya whose predecessors had been stationed in the region since 1945, and two other Guards Motor Rifle Divisions transferred from the Moscow Military District: the 11th (Bezrechnaya), 32nd, and the 38th (Sretensk). However, the 32nd Guards returned to the Moscow Military District in 1970. The 86th Corps was redesignated as the second formation of the 36th Army on 1 June 1976, covering the southeast border of Transbaikal. In addition to its divisions, the army included other units transferred from European Russia, such as the 240th Anti-Aircraft Missile Brigade at Borzya, transferred in early 1975 from the 7th Tank Army of the Belorussian Military District. By the end of the 1980s, the 11th, 14th, 16th, and 18th, and 19th Fortified Regions were part of the army.

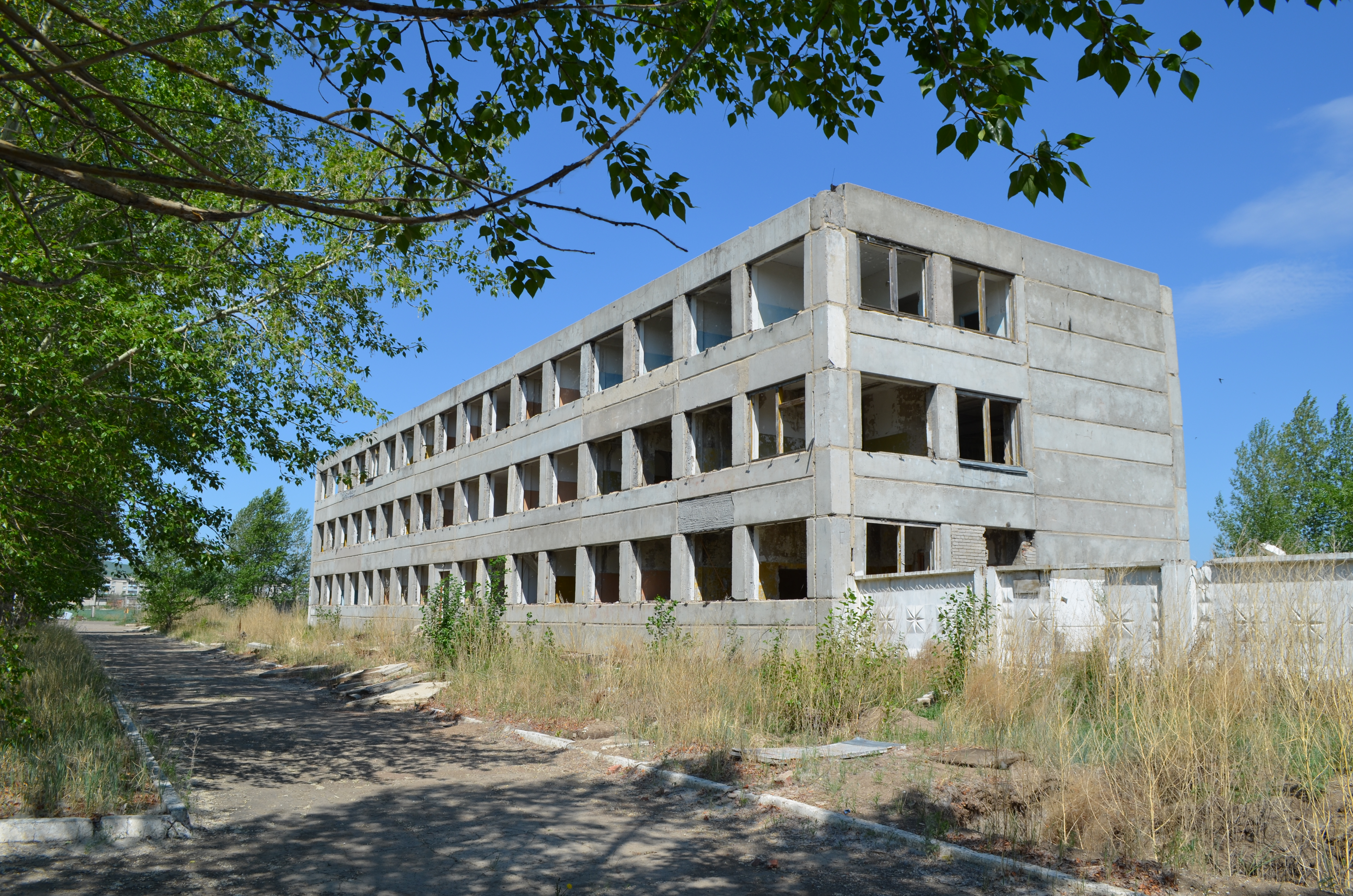
Abandoned barracks of the 18th Fortified Region, Krasnokamensk

On 1 June 1989, the army was downsized into the 55th Army Corps. Later that year, as Soviet military expenditure declined with the winding down of the Cold War, the 38th Guards and 122nd Guards became the 131st Guards and 122nd Guards Machine Gun Artillery Divisions, respectively. The five fortified regions were merged to form regiments in the latter, while the 11th Guards Division was reduced to a weapons and equipment storage base in 1990. The corps was transferred to the Russian Ground Forces when the Soviet Union dissolved, and was redesignated as the 36th Army again in 1997.

=== Commanders ===
The following officers are known to have commanded the 86th Army Corps and the army:

- Major General Yakov Gugnyak (23 May 1968 – 30 December 1969)
- Major General Alexander Borodayev (31 January 1970 – 9 November 1972)
- Major General Vladimir Krayev (promoted to Lieutenant General 31 October 1980; August 1980 – 1985)
- Major General Leonty Kuznetsov (1985–November 1987)
- Major General Georgy Kondratiev (December 1987 – March 1989)
