= 300th Mechanized Regiment =

300th Mechanized Regiment 300 механізований полк
- 300-й окремий гвардійський Будапештський механізований полк
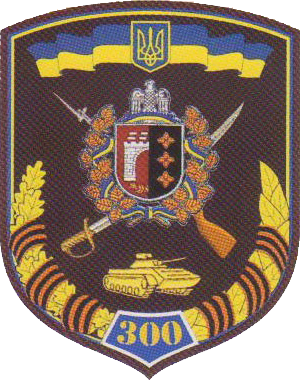
- Regiment Insignia
- Active: 1992–2013
- Country: Ukraine
- Branch: Ukrainian Ground Forces
- Type: Mechanized
- Part of: 13th Army Corps
- Garrison/HQ: Chernivtsi, Chernivtsi Oblast
- Engagements: Battle of Budapest
- Battle honours: Budapest

Commanders
- Current commander: Lieutenant Colonel Oleksandr Bida

Insignia
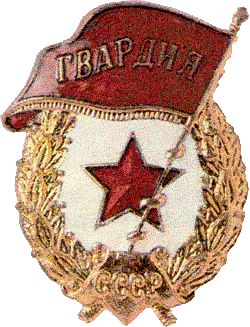
- Soviet Guards badge

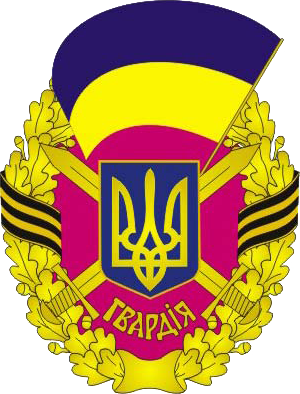
- Ukrainian Guards badge

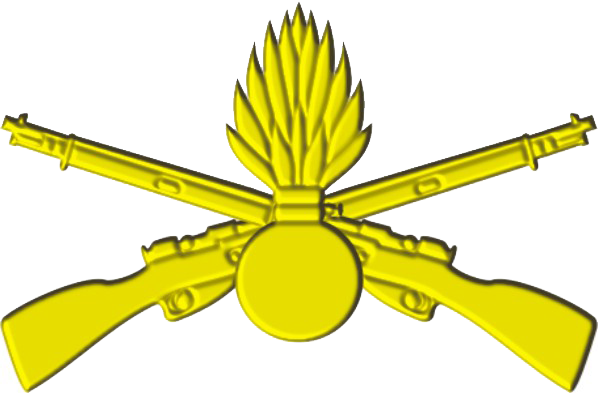
- Mechanized branch insignia

The 300th Guards Mechanized Regiment (Ukrainian: 300-й окремий гвардійський Будапештський механізований полк, romanized: 300-y hvardiys'kyi Budapeshts'kyi mekhanizovanyi polk) was a formation of the Ukrainian Ground Forces. The full name of the regiment is the 300th Separate Guards Mechanized Budapest Regiment.

== History ==
The Regiment was formed as 145th Guards Training Motor-Rifle Budapest Regiment. 145 Guards TMRR was previously 145th Guards Rifle Regiment, part of 66th Guards Motor Rifle Training Division, the former 66th Guards Rifle Division. After October 30, 2000, by the order of the President of Ukraine, the name of the Regiment was changed to 300th Separate Guards Mechanized Budapest Regiment.

The regiment was disbanded on 30 October 2013. The 87th Air Assault Battalion of the 80th Separate Air Assault Brigade was later established on the remains of the regiment.

== Traditions ==
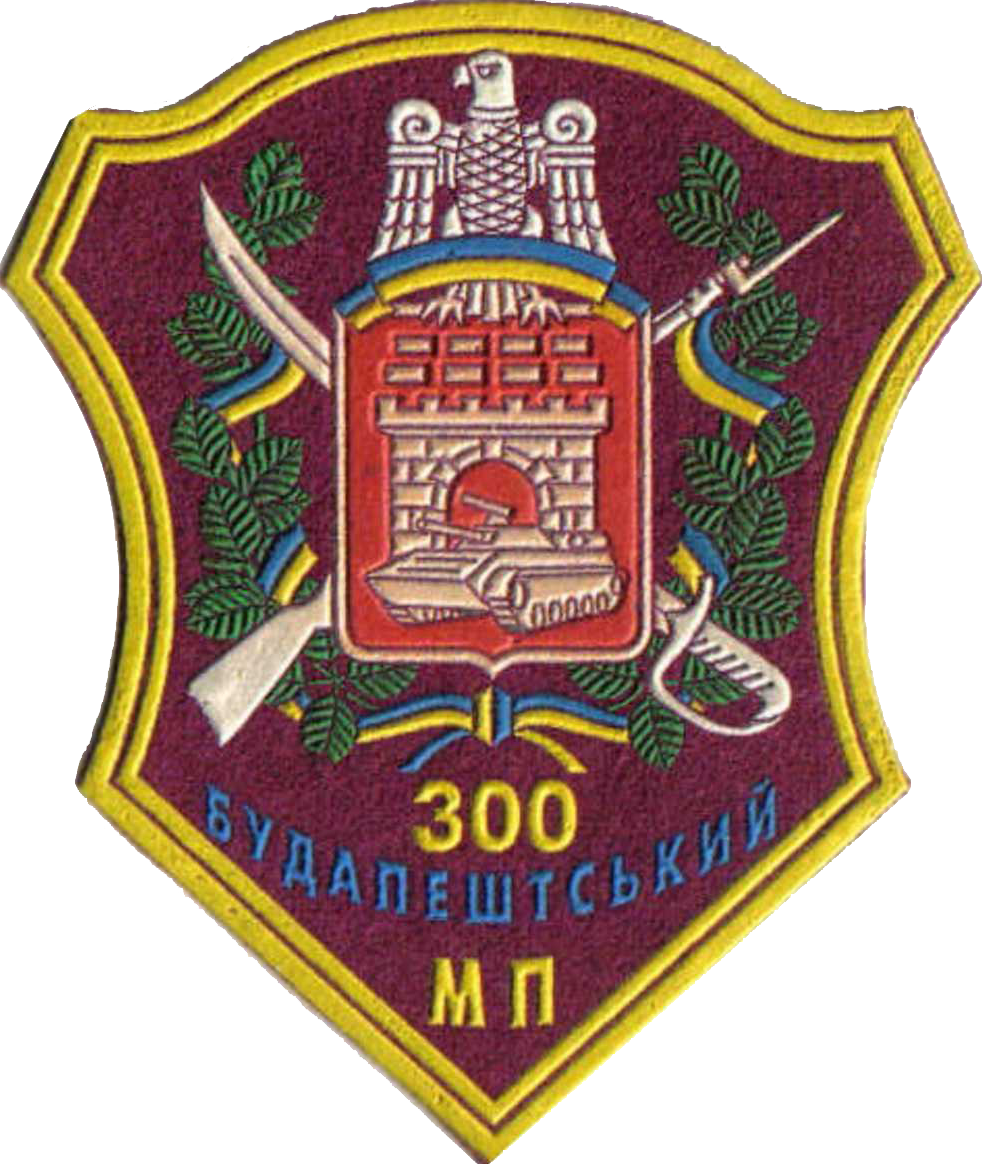
Arm badge

== Past Commanders ==
- (2001 – 2005) Lieutenant Colonel Ruslan Khomchak
- (2005) Lieutenant Colonel Supryhan Valery Anatoliyovych
- (2005 – 2007) Lieutenant Colonel Volodymyr Yuriyovych Trunovsky
- (2007 – 2008) Lieutenant Colonel Oleksandr Mykolayovych Bida
- (2008 – 2013) Lieutenant Colonel Zabolotny Viktor
- (2013) Colonel Serhiy Shaptala
