= Pavel Lagutin =

Soviet lieutenant general (1896–1975)

Pavel Filippovich Lagutin
- Mjr. Gen. Pavel Lagutin in 1943–44
- Native name: Павел Филиппович Лагутин
- Born: 27 January 1896; Kalyaninskoye, Ryazan Governorate, Russian Empire
- Died: 31 January 1975 (aged 79)
- Allegiance: Russian Empire; Russian SFSR; Soviet Union
- Branch: Imperial Russian Army; Red Army (Soviet Army from 1946)
- Service years: 1915–1917; 1918–1953
- Rank: Lieutenant general
- Commands: 293rd Rifle Division; 66th Guards Rifle Division; 23rd Guards Rifle Corps; 22nd Guards Rifle Corps
- Conflicts: World War II; Battle of Stalingrad; Battle of Kursk; Operation August Storm
- Awards: Order of the Red Banner (4); Order of Suvorov 2nd class; Order of the Patriotic War 1st class

Pavel Filippovich Lagutin (Russian: Павел Филиппович Лагутин; 27 January 1896 – 31 January 1975) was a Soviet Army lieutenant general who commanded the 293rd Rifle Division during World War II. He led the 293rd from its formation through its fighting in the Battle of Stalingrad. For its actions at Stalingrad, the division became the 66th Guards Rifle Division. As the battle came to a close, Lagutin was appointed deputy commander of the 21st Army and continued in that position when the army became the 6th Guards Army. He continued in that position for the rest of the war, and served as deputy commander of the 25th Army during the Soviet invasion of Manchuria.

== Early life, World War I, and Russian Civil War ==
Lagutin was born on 27 January 1896 in Kalyaninskoye, Zaraysky Uyezd, Ryazan Governorate in what is now the Lukhovitsky District of Moscow Oblast. He lived in Saint Petersburg and worked at the Otto Kirchner factory (later named Svetoch) and then the Yakor printing house from 1913. Conscripted into the Imperial Russian Army in July 1915, Lagutin was sent to the 24th Reserve Regiment at Mariupol. After graduating from the training detachment of the regiment in 1916, he served with it as a platoon unter-ofitser. Sent to the front in May 1917, Lagutin became a platoon commander and feldfebel in the 35th Bryansk Infantry Regiment of the 9th Infantry Division. With the regiment he fought in the Pinsk Marshes near Baranovichi, in the area of Krevo and Smorgon, and on the Romanian Front before being demobilized on 20 December 1917.

During the Russian Civil War, Lagutin was mobilized into the Red Army on 3 October 1918 and sent as a starshina to the 9th Reserve Battalion at Ryazan. As a platoon commander in the 492nd Rifle Regiment of the 56th Rifle Division of the 7th Army of the Northern Front from October 1919, he fought in battles in the region of Yamburg against the Northwestern Army. Completing the Commanders Refresher Course of the 7th Army from 31 December 1919 to 15 May 1920, Lagutin then entered the Vystrel course. in October of that year he was sent to the Southern Front with the 2nd Regiment of the Consolidated Ukrainian Cadet Division as an assistant company commander, fighting against the Army of Wrangel.

== Interwar period ==
After the end of the war, Lagutin returned to the Vystrel course in March 1921. After graduating with honors in August of that year, he was sent to the 24th Omsk Infantry School, serving there as a company commander, head of a class and instructor, and battalion commander. Completing the Vystrel course for a second time between September 1926 and August 1927, he was then sent to the 62nd Novorossiysk Rifle Regiment of the 21st Rifle Division of the Siberian Military District, where he served as assistant regimental commander for personnel and acting regimental commander. Transferred to the Separate Red Banner Caucasus Army in October 1930, Lagutin served there as commander and commissar of the 2nd Caucasian Mountain Rifle Regiment of the 1st Caucasian Mountain Rifle Division. For "success in combat training", the regiment received the Order of the Red Star on 17 August 1936. Lagutin became chief of the department for command personnel of the Transcaucasian Military District in February 1937. By then a kombrig, he was placed at the disposal of the Red Army Personnel Directorate between 17 August 1938 and December 1939, then appointed chief of a course of the special department of the Frunze Military Academy.

== World War II ==
After Operation Barbarossa began, on 10 July 1941, Lagutin was appointed commander of the 293rd Rifle Division, forming at Sumy in the Kharkov Military District. In the second half of August, the division was sent to the Southwestern Front and fought in defensive battles on the Desna north of Konotop as part of the 40th Army, covering the Korop axis. Reduced to a strength of roughly 2,000 to 2,100 personnel by early September, the division subsequently conducted a fighting retreat towards the Seym and defended for several days in the region of Novosyolov and Mutino. The 293rd was withdrawn to the army reserve on 10 September, and Lagutin appointed commander of a consolidated detachment consisting of the remnants of the division and the detachment of Major General Chesnov. Encircled, the detachment fought in the region of Skunasovka, Buren, and Mikhaylovka, tasked with defending Vorozhba and Belopolye. From 21 September, the division broke out of the encirclement along the Seym, bypassing Belopolye on the Vir. After escaping encirclement by 1 November the division took up defensive positions in the region of Manturovo, Bely Kolodez, and Snutokino, northeast of Tim. From 20 December the division fought in attacks on the Kursk and Belgorod axis. Lagutin was promoted to major general on 27 December.

The division joined the 21st Army of the front on 20 February 1942 and fought in the Second Battle of Kharkov and the Battle of Voronezh. In early July it retreated to the Don in the face of advancing German motorized infantry and crossed the river in the region of Korotoyak, then was withdrawn into the army reserve. The 293rd marched to the region of Kolobrodov and Lebyazhye by 20 July, reduced to 505 personnel. The remnants of the regimental headquarters and the division headquarters marched to the region of Bolshoy Lychag which they reached by 4 August. From there, the division command and remnants of the regimental headquarters entrained at Rakovka station and were railed to Buzuluk for rebuilding. In October the rebuilt 293rd returned to the Battle of Stalingrad and joined the 63rd Army of the Don Front in defensive battles on the right bank of the Don in the region of Starokletskaya, Puzinsky, Karamensky, and Severny. Lagutin was awarded his first Order of the Red Banner on 5 November for his leadership of the division during the battles near Manturovo and the Second Battle of Kharkov.

The 293rd went on the offensive during Operation Uranus on 19 November and by the morning of 24 November it reached the right bank of the Don in the Kalach region. On the night of 25 November it crossed over the ice on the river in the Golubinsky region and began three days of fighting for Illarionovsky khutor. After clashes with tanks and motorized infantry, the 293rd captured the khutor, reaching the western slope of height 131.5, where it entrenched. The division was withdrawn to the second echelon of the army from 13 December, then from 10 January 1943 fought in Operation Koltso. It was redesignated as the 66th Guards Rifle Division on 21 January, and during the month Lagutin was appointed deputy commander of the 21st Army. On 5 February, he was awarded the Order of Suvorov 2nd class for his leadership during the division's breakthrough at Stalingrad.

After the end of the fighting at Stalingrad, the army was withdrawn to the Reserve of the Supreme High Command (RVGK). The division became part of the Central Front on 15 February before joining the Voronezh Front on 14 March. By 1 May, the army was reorganized as the 6th Guards Army. Lagutin commanded the 23rd Guards Rifle Corps of the front between 31 July and 8 August during the Battle of Kursk and the Belgorod–Kharkov offensive operation, before returning to his previous post. He was awarded the Order of the Patriotic War 1st class on 27 August 1943. The army was withdrawn to the RVGK on 30 September, and in October transferred to the 2nd Baltic Front. Conducting a march to the Nevel region, the army took up defensive positions west of the city. Lagutin was wounded and evacuated to a hospital on 3 November, and on his return from 5 April 1944 returned to his duties as army deputy commander. The army fought in Operation Bagration, the Šiauliai offensive, the Riga offensive, and the capture of Polotsk as part of the 1st Baltic Front. He was promoted to Lieutenant general on 13 September and awarded a second Order of the Red Banner on 19 September. In the final weeks of the war in 1945, after fighting in the Memel Offensive, the army and front blockaded the Courland Pocket. Lagutin commanded the 22nd Guards Rifle Corps on the Leningrad Front between 7 and 26 May.

In July 1945, Lagutin was sent to the Far East to become the deputy commander of the 25th Army. For his leadership during the Soviet invasion of Manchuria, in which the army fought in the Harbin–Kirin offensive as part of the 1st Far Eastern Front, he was awarded the Order of the Red Banner a third time on 26 August.

== Postwar ==
After the end of the war, Lagutin continued to serve with the army as part of the Primorsky Military District in Pyongyang. After completing the Higher Academic Course at the Voroshilov Higher Military Academy between May 1949 and May 1950, he was appointed a senior instructor at the academy. Retired due to illness on 16 February 1953, Lagutin died in Moscow on 31 January 1975.

== Awards ==
Lagutin was a recipient of the following awards and decorations:

- Order of Lenin
- Order of the Red Banner (4)
- Order of Suvorov, 2nd class
- Order of the Patriotic War, 1st class
- Order of the Red Star
- Medals
