= Golubinsky 2-y =

Golubinsky 2-y Голубинский 2-й
- Khutor
- Location within Volgograd Oblast Location within Russia
- Coordinates: 49°04′N 43°29′E
- Country: Russia
- Region: Volgograd Oblast
- District: Kalachyovsky District
- Time zone: UTC+4:00

Golubinsky 2-y (Russian: Голубинский 2-й) is a rural locality (a khutor) in Golubinskoye Rural Settlement, Kalachyovsky District, Volgograd Oblast, Russia. The population was 24 as of 2010. There are 3 streets.

== Geography ==
Golubinsky 2-y is located in steppe, on Yergeny, 63 km north of Kalach-na-Donu (the district's administrative centre) by road. Malogolubinsky is the nearest rural locality.
