= 22nd Mechanized Brigade =

Ukrainian Ground Forces formation

22nd Mechanized Brigade (2000–2003, 2023–present) 66th Mechanized Division (1992–2000) 110th Guards Separate Training Center (1987–1992) 66th Guards Training Motor Rifle Division (1960–1987) 66th Guards Motor Rifle Division (1957–1960) 66th Guards Rifle Division (1943–1957) 293rd Rifle Division (1941–1943)
- Sleeve Patch of the 22nd Brigade
- Active: 18 July 1941 – 2003; 4 January 2023 – present
- Country: Ukraine
- Branch: Ukrainian Ground Forces
- Type: Mechanized Infantry
- Size: 2,000
- Part of: Operational Command West
- Garrison/HQ: Chernivtsi, Chernivtsi Oblast
- Motto: We pacify predators with a sword (Ukrainian: Хижих мечем мирим)
- Engagements: World War II; Second Battle of Kharkov; Operation Uranus; Battle of Kursk; Battle of the Dnieper; Battle of Korsun–Cherkassy; Lvov-Sandomierz Offensive; Battle of the Dukla Pass; Battle of Budapest; Balaton Defensive Operation; Vienna Offensive; Hungarian Uprising; Soviet-Afghan War; Russo-Ukrainian War; Invasion of Ukraine; Battle of Bakhmut; August 2024 Kursk Oblast incursion
- Decorations: Order of the Red Banner (removed)
- Battle honours: Poltava (removed); Bukovina (removed)
- Website: https://www.facebook.com/22ombr

Commanders
- Notable commanders: Major General Pavel Lagutin (1st Commander)

Insignia
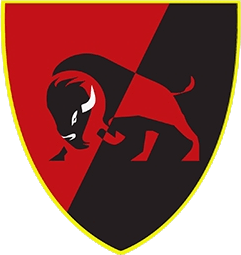
- Old sleeve patch of the 22nd Mechanized Brigade (Pre February 2023)

The 22nd Mechanized Brigade "Mykolaiv" is a formation of the Ukrainian Ground Forces. It traces its origins to the 66th Guards Rifle Division, originally a formation of the Red Army and later of the Soviet Ground Forces.

The unit became the 22nd Mechanized Brigade in 2000 and was disbanded in 2003, before being reactivated in 2023 amid the Russian invasion of Ukraine.

== History ==
=== First formation ===
By Order of the People's Commissariat of Defense of the USSR № 034 from January 21, 1943, the 293rd Rifle Division was reorganized into the 66th Guards Rifle Division. Major General Akim Yakshin became Division's new commander after Pavel Lagutin was promoted to Executive officer of the 21st Army. On February 7, 1943, most of the Divisions units were renamed.

On March 17, 1943, the 66th was assigned to 6th Guards Rifle Corps, 1st Guards Army, Southwestern Front, from May 5, 1943, the 66th was assigned to 5th Guards Army Steppe Military District. From May 9, 1943, the 66th was with 32nd Guards Rifle Corps 5th Guards Army. During Battle of Kursk and Lower Dnepr strategic offensive operation the 66th was with 33rd Guards Rifle Corps 5th Guards Army, later she was again assigned to 32nd Guards Corps. On September 23, 1943, the 66th was awarded with the honorable name "Poltava" by Supreme Commander. By the end of October the 66th was with 53rd Army, 2nd Ukrainian Front. On November 28, 1943, Major General Sergey Frolov became new Divisions commander, he would remain there until the end of the war. On November 30, 1943, the 66th was with 20th Guards Rifle Corps 4th Guards Army. On January 3, 1944 66th was assigned to 48th Rifle Corps 53rd Army. While taking part in Korsun-Shevchenkovsky Offensive Operation, 66th was with 75th Rifle Corps, later she was assigned to 26th Guards Rifle Corps.

On March 1, 1943, 66th was with 69th Army reserve of Stavka near Shpola Cherkasy Oblast. On April 11, 1944 Division was relocated by rail to Zaporizhia with 1st Ukrainian Front. During Lvov-Sandomierz Offensive 66th was with 95th Rifle Corps 18th Army 1st Ukrainian Front. During the East Carpathian Strategic Offensive Operation (the Dnieper–Carpathian Offensive) the division was assigned to 18th Guards Rifle Corps 18th Army 4th Ukrainian Front. From September 16, 1944, Division also took part in Carpathian-Uzhgorod Offensive.

On November 14, 1944, 66th with 18th Guards Rifle Corps was assigned to 2nd Ukrainian Front where she took part in Battle of Budapest. On January 23, 1943 66th was with 104th Rifle Corps 4th Guards Army 3rd Ukrainian Front and took part in Balaton Defensive Operation. On April 5, 1945, the Division was awarded Order of the Red Banner by Supreme Soviet of the USSR. From April 15, 1945 66th was with 21st Guards Rifle Corps 4th Guards Army and took part in Vienna Offensive. Division finished combat operations in Austria on May 8, 1945

After Victory Day 66th with 27th Army from June 3 to August 23, 1945, was relocating to Ukraine into Carpathian Military District. Its first base was in Haisyn, Vinnytsia Oblast. From October 1946 Division was assigned to 38th Army in Chernivtsi. Division took part in Hungarian Revolution of 1956. On June 15, 1957 66th Guards Rifle Division became 66th Guards Motor Rifle Division.

On September 15, 1960, 66th became 66th Guards Training Motor Rifle Division. In 1987, 66th Guards Training Motor Rifle Division became 110th Guards Separate Training Center for junior specialists of motor rifle troops of the Carpathian Military District. During the Soviet–Afghan War, they were stationed in the Samarkhel Military Base in Jalalabad, as well as Asadabad, before 2 February 1989 where control was handed over to the Afghan Army’s 11th Motorized Infantry Division.

The Training Center became under Ukrainian control after Ukraine declared independence from the Soviet Union. On January 19, 1992, the Training Center along with all other units stationed in Ukraine, pledged their allegiance to Ukrainian people. In May 1992, the 110th Guards Districts Training Center was disbanded by the directive of the Ministry of Defense. On September 1, 1992, a new 66th Mechanized Division started forming on the basis of units from the disbanded Training Center.

A few units from the 17th Guards Motor Rifle Division were added to the Division, when the 17th was reduced to a Brigade. Division was a part of the 38th Army Corps (former 38th Army) Western Operational Command. On October 26, 1999, President of Ukraine Leonid Kuchma awarded the Division with Bukovina title. On October 30, 2000, all of the honorifics which the Division earned throughout her history were restored. Name of the Division became 66th Guards Bukovina, Poltava Red Banner Mechanized Division. Soon after, the Division was reformed into the 22nd Mechanized Brigade, all of the Divisions regalia was lost. During 2003 only 300th Mechanized Regiment remained, the rest of the units of the brigade were disbanded.

=== Second formation ===
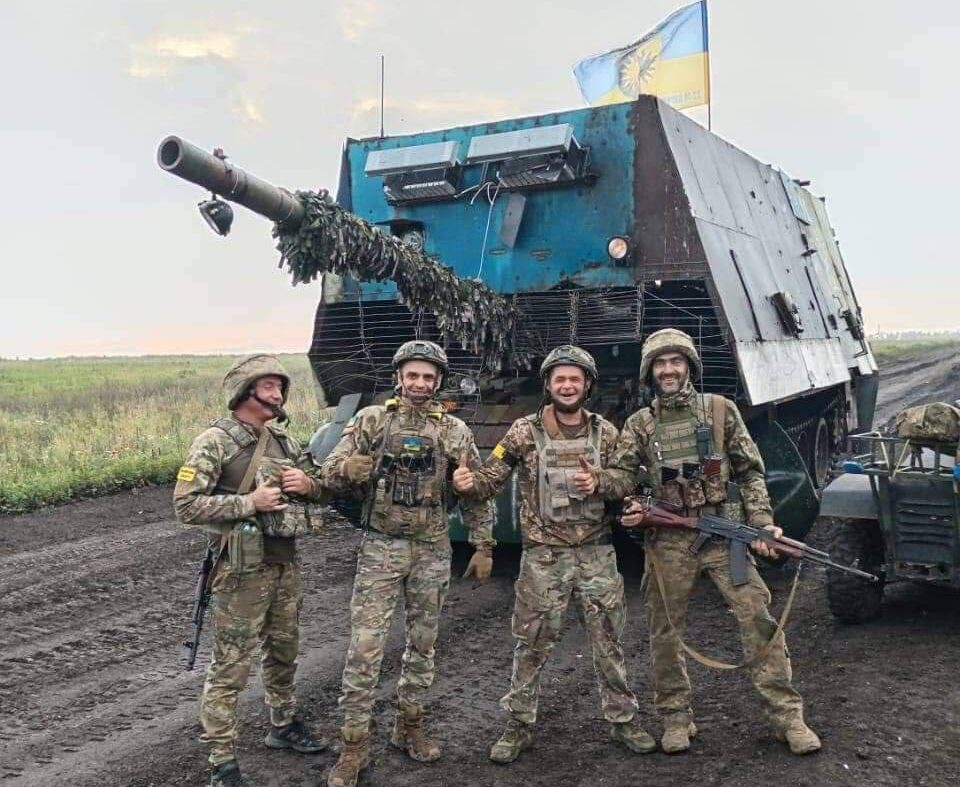
Soldiers of the 22nd Mechanized Brigade with a captured Russian turtle tank, 2024

In early 2023, during the Russian invasion of Ukraine, the brigade was reactivated and was armed with ex-Soviet weaponry, such as BMP-1 fighting vehicles, BM-21 rocket-launchers, 2S1 and 2S3 howitzers, and ZU-23 anti-aircraft guns. In addition, it received modernized T-72 tanks, including T-72AMT, T-72 Ural, and the Polish-supplied PT-91 Twardy, as well as American-supplied HMMWV vehicles. In June 2023, some units of the brigade were seen taking part in the battle of Bakhmut.

The brigade was among the first to enter Russia's Kursk Oblast during the Ukrainian operation there. In early January 2025, a unit of the 22nd Brigade published footage depicting the brigade's 1st Mechanized Battalion, in cooperation with other units, clearing the village of Nikolaevka in Kursk Oblast from North Korean forces, reportedly killing at least nine of them. In late January 2025, the 1st Battalion claimed to have killed a North Korean special forces company commander during combat near Malaya Loknya. On 5 May 2025, the brigade was awarded the honorary name "Mykolaiv" by a decree of President Volodymyr Zelenskyy.

== Order of battle ==
=== 293rd Rifle Division (July 7, 1941) ===
- 1032nd Rifle Regiment
- 1034th Rifle Regiment
- 1036th Rifle Regiment
- 817th Artillery Regiment
- 576th Separate Anti-Aircraft Artillery Battalion
- 350th Separate Reconnaissance Battalion
- 586th Engineer Battalion
- 571st Separate Signal Battalion
- 721st Transport Company
- 319th Medical Battalion
- 384th Separate Chemical Company
- 377th Field Bakery
- 645th Divisions Veterinary Hospital
- 973rd Field Post Office
- 859th field branch of State Bank of the USSR

=== 293rd Rifle Division (October 12, 1942) ===
- 1032nd Rifle Regiment
- 1034th Rifle Regiment
- 1036th Rifle Regiment
- 817th Artillery Regiment
- 331st Anti-Tank Battalion
- 586th Separate Engineer Battalion
- 414th Separate Anti-Aircraft Battery
- 350th Separate Reconnaissance Company
- 243rd Separate Supply Company
- 384th Separate Chemical Company
- 319th Separate Medical Battalion
- 420th Transport Company
- 27th Field Bakery
- 645th Divisions Veterinary Hospital
- 973rd Field Post Office
- 859th field branch of State Bank of the USSR
- Training Rifle Battalion

=== 66th Guards Rifle Division (February 7, 1943 – June 15, 1957) ===
- 145th Guards Rifle Regiment
- 193rd Guards Rifle Regiment
- 195th Guards Rifle Regiment
- 135th Guards Artillery Regiment
- 71st Guards Anti-Tank Battalion
- 74th Separate Guards Engineer Battalion
- 81st Guards Separate Anti-Aircraft Battery
- 67th Separate Guards Reconnaissance Company
- 94th Separate Guards Supply Company
- 68th Separate Guards Chemical Company
- 72nd Separate Medical Battalion
- 70th Transport Company
- 64th Field Bakery
- 65th Divisions Veterinary Hospital
- 973rd Field Post Office
- 859th field branch of State Bank of the USSR
- Training Rifle Battalion

=== 66th Guards Motor Rifle Division (June 15, 1957 – September 15, 1960) ===
- 145th Guards Motor Rifle Regiment
- 193rd Guards Motor Rifle Regiment
- 195th Guards Motor Rifle Regiment
- 128th Guards Tank Regiment
- 358th Separate Signal Battalion
- 278th Separate Chemical Platoon
- 495th Separate Anti-Aircraft Artillery Battalion
- 101st Separate Reconnaissance Company
- 358th Separate Guards Signal Company
- 74th Separate Guards Engineer Battalion

=== 66th Guards Training Motor Rifle Division (September 15, 1960 – 1987) ===
- 145th Guards Training Motor Rifle Regiment
- 193rd Guards Training Motor Rifle Regiment – 193rd Motor Rifle Regiment (1961)
- 195th Guards Training Motor Rifle Regiment
- 128th Guards Training Tank Regiment
- 135th Guards Training Artillery Regiment
- 495th Separate Guards Anti-Aircraft Artillery Battalion
- 74th Separate Guards Training Engineer Battalion
- 179th Separate Guards Training Signal Battalion
- 81st Separate Training Chemical Battalion – 56th Separate Chemical Company – 524th Separate Training Chemical Battalion (1961) – 247th Separate Chemical Company (1985)
- 79th Separate Training Medical Battalion
- 363rd Separate Transport Company
- 650th Armored Maintenance Depot (until March 1, 1964)
- 792nd Auto Maintenance Depot (until March 1, 1964)
- 847th Separate Rocket Battalion (May 1, 1962)
- 435th Separate Maintenance Battalion (March 1, 1964) – 435th Separate Training Maintenance Battalion (December 1, 1972)
- 1262nd Separate Training Repair Battalion (1985)

=== 110th Guards Separate Training Center (1987–1992) ===
- 145th Guards Training Budapest Motor Rifle Regiment (Chernivtsi)
- 193rd Guards Training Motor Rifle Regiment (Chernivtsi)
- 195th Guards Training Motor Rifle Regiment (Chernivtsi)
- 128th Guards Training Tank Regiment (Storozhynets)
- 135th Guards Training Artillery Regiment (Chernivtsi)
- 1292nd Training Anti-Aircraft Artillery Regiment (Chernivtsi)
- 847th Separate Rocket Battalion (Chernivtsi)
- 1262nd Separate Training Reconnaissance Battalion (Chernivtsi)
- 179th Separate Guards Signal Battalion (Chernivtsi)
- 74th Separate Training Engineer Battalion (Chernivtsi)
- 79th Separate Medical Battalion
- 780th Separate Supply Battalion
- 435th Separate Training Maintenance Battalion

=== 66th Mechanized Division (1992–2000) ===
- Headquarters (Chernivtsi)
- 200th Mechanized Regiment (Chernivtsi)
- 300th Mechanized Regiment (Chernivtsi)
- 301st Mechanized Regiment (Chernivtsi)
- 201st Armored Regiment (Storozhynets)
- 50th Separate Engineer Battalion (village Ruda, Khmelnytskyi Oblast)
- 28th Separate Signal Battalion (Chernivtsi)
- 70th Separate Maintenance Battalion (Storozhynets)
- 180th Separate Combat Service Support Battalion (Chernivtsi)
- 50th Separate Medical Battalion (Chernivtsi)
- 26th Separate Reconnaissance Battalion (Chernivtsi)
- 15th Separate Chemical Battalion (Chernivtsi)
- 245th Separate Anti-Tank Battalion (Chernivtsi)
- 93rd Artillery Regiment
- 300th Anti-Aircraft Regiment
- 40th Separate Electronic Warfare Company
- 2238th Field Post Office
- Training Range

=== 22nd Mechanized Brigade (2000–2003) ===
- 300th Mechanized Regiment (Chernivtsi)
- 201st Armored Regiment (Storozhynets)
- 2206th Separate Brigade Artillery Group (Chernivtsi)
- 26th Separate Reconnaissance Battalion (Chernivtsi)
- 28th Separate Signal Battalion (Chernivtsi)
- 50th Separate Engineer Battalion (village Ruda, Khmelnytskyi Oblast)
- 180th Separate Combat Service Support Battalion (Chernivtsi)
- 70th Separate Maintenance Battalion (Storozhynets)

=== 22nd Mechanized Brigade (2022–) ===
- 22nd Mechanized Brigade
  - Headquarters & Headquarters Company
  - 1st Mechanized Battalion
  - 2nd Mechanized Battalion
  - 3rd Mechanized Battalion
  - 409th Separate Rifle Battalion (Ukraine)
  - Tank Battalion
  - Field Artillery Regiment
    - Headquarters and Target Acquisition Battery
    - Recon Battery
    - Observer Battery
    - Self-propelled artillery Battalion
    - Rocket Artillery Battalion
  - Attack Drone Company "Demons of the Storm"
  - Anti-Aircraft Defense Battalion
  - Reconnaissance Company
  - Combat Engineer Battalion
  - Logistic Battalion
  - Signal Company
  - Maintenance Battalion
  - Radar Company
  - Medical Company
  - Chemical, Biological, Radiological and Nuclear Defense Company
  - Brigade Band

== Former Commanders ==
- Major General Pavel Lagutin – December 27, 1941 – January 21, 1943
- Major General Akim Yakshin – January 21, 1943 – November 15, 1943
- Major General Sergey Frolov – November 28, 1943 –

== Honors ==
=== Unit decorations ===
Ribbon	Award	Year	Notes
	Order of the Red Banner	April 5, 1945	Awarded by Supreme Soviet of the USSR. Removed after Brigade's dissolution.

=== Honorable Titles ===
Image	Title	Year	Notes
	Guards unit	January 21, 1943	Awarded by the order People's Commissariat of Defence of the USSR № 034. Removed after Brigade's dissolution.
	Poltava	September 23, 1943	Awarded by Supreme Commander. Removed after Brigade's dissolution.
	Bukovina	October 26, 1999	Awarded by President of Ukraine. Removed after Brigade's dissolution.

== Bibliography ==
- Slobodianiuk, M. V. (2005). Military Symbols of Ukraine, Rebirth from ashes. Lviv. pp. 54–101. СО26779.
- Karpov, Victor V.; Tabachnyk, Dmytro V. (2006). Ukrainian Military Symbols. Kyiv: Lybid. pp. 104–106. ISBN 966-06-0453-X.
- Feskov, V.I.; Kalashnikov, K.A.; Golikov, V.I. (2004). The Soviet Army in the Years of the Cold War 1945–91. Tomsk: Tomsk University Publishing House. ISBN 5-7511-1819-7.
- Lenskiy, A.G.; Tsybin, M.M. (2001). The Soviet Ground Forces in the last years of the USSR. St Petersburg: B&K.
