= 298th Rifle Division =

- Active: 1st formation: July–December 1941; 2nd formation: December 1941 – March 1943; 3rd formation: July 1943 – 1946
- Country: Soviet Union
- Branch: Red Army
- Type: Rifle division
- Engagements: World War II
- Battle honours: Khingan (3rd formation)

Commanders
- Notable commanders: Nikolay Vasilyev

The 298th Rifle Division (Russian: 298-я стрелковая дивизия) was an infantry division of the Soviet Union's Red Army during World War II, formed three times.

The division was first formed in the summer of 1941 and was destroyed in the Bryansk pocket in the fall of that year. Reformed in December 1941 in Siberia, the division became a guards unit for its actions in the Battle of Stalingrad in March 1943. It was reformed in July 1943 in the Soviet Far East, and fought in the Soviet invasion of Manchuria in August 1945, before being disbanded in 1946.

== History ==
=== First Formation ===
The 298th began forming on 2 July 1941 at Kalinin, part of the Moscow Military District. Its basic order of battle included the 886th, 888th, and the 892nd Rifle Regiments, as well as the 828th Artillery Regiment. In early August it was moved west, and assigned to the Reserve Front's 24th Army on 5 August, with its headquarters at Sychyovka. After briefly transferring to the 49th Army, the 298th was withdrawn to the Bryansk Front reserve to complete its formation. In September it became part of the 13th Army of the front. At the beginning of Operation Typhoon, the German offensive on Moscow, the division was trapped and destroyed in the Bryansk pocket by mid-October. On 27 December the 298th was officially disbanded.

=== Second Formation ===
The 298th was reformed from late December 1941 to 17 January 1942 at Barnaul, part of the Siberian Military District. Its basic order of battle was the same as the previous formation, and the 298th's commander was assigned on 17 January. After completing its formation, the division was transferred west to the Western Front's 50th Army, where it remained until August. In response to Case Blue, the German summer offensive which was advancing on Stalingrad, the 298th was moved to south and became an infantry unit of the 4th Tank Army, fighting in the Stalingrad area. The division became part of the 24th Army just before it fought in Operation Uranus in November, the Soviet counteroffensive, which trapped German troops in Stalingrad. It was transferred to the 21st Army reserve by 16 December. On 28 and 29 December, an assault group from the division participated in attacks alongside assault groups from four other rifle divisions, inflicting heavy losses on the German 44th and 376th Infantry Divisions.

In the original offensive plan for Operation Ring, the offensive that eliminated the pocket, the division, still with 21st Army, held positions on the margins of the Marinovka salient held by XIV Panzer Corps, and was to play a supporting role in the assault. For the offensive, which began on 10 January, the division held positions on the western face of the salient adjacent to the 96th Rifle Division; both units were to advance east from Bairak Balka towards Vodyanaya Balka against stay-behind forces from the 8th and 29th Regiments of the German 3rd Motorized Division. The assault was successful, and on 12 January it attacked southeast and east alongside the 277th and 96th Rifle Divisions, advancing between 3 and 4 kilometers and pushing the remnants of the 29th and 3rd Motorized Divisions into a narrow pocket southwest of the Dmitrievka-Karpovka road. For the attack on 13 January, the division was regrouped in order to advance east towards Pitomnik Airfield alongside other 21st Army divisions, where it would link up with troops of the 57th Army.

The 298th remained with the 24th Army during Operation Ring in January and February 1943, which eliminated the pocket. For its actions at Stalingrad, the division was converted into the 80th Guards Rifle Division on 1 March.

=== Third Formation ===
The 298th was reformed for the third and last time on 1 July 1943 in the Transbaikal Front, still with the same basic order of battle as previous formations. It became part of the 36th Army, with which it served for the rest of the war. The division fought in the Soviet invasion of Manchuria from 8 August to 3 September 1945, during which it quickly advanced through Japanese fortifications at Jalainur and Manzhouli in less than two days, meeting only disorganized resistance. The rest of the advance was mostly unopposed pursuit into Manchuria, so the division only saw about two days of combat. The division received the honorific "Khingan" for its actions, and was disbanded during the spring and summer of 1946 as part of the Transbaikal-Amur Military District.
