= Kolobrodov =

Kolobrodov Колобродов
- Khutor
- Location within Volgograd Oblast Location within Russia
- Coordinates: 49°47′N 43°26′E
- Country: Russia
- Region: Volgograd Oblast
- District: Frolovsky District
- Time zone: UTC+4:00

Kolobrodov (Russian: Колобродов) is a rural locality (a khutor) in Vetyutnevskoye Rural Settlement, Frolovsky District, Volgograd Oblast, Russia. The population was 217 as of 2010.

== Geography ==
Kolobrodov is located on Archeda River, 19 km west of Prigorodny (the district's administrative centre) by road. Shkolny is the nearest rural locality.
