= Sukhanovsky =

Sukhanovsky Сухановский
- Khutor
- Location within Volgograd Oblast Location within Russia
- Coordinates: 48°55′N 43°14′E
- Country: Russia
- Region: Volgograd Oblast
- District: Surovikinsky District
- Time zone: UTC+4:00

Sukhanovsky (Russian: Сухановский) is a rural locality (a khutor) in Kachalinskoye Rural Settlement, Surovikinsky District, Volgograd Oblast, Russia. The population was 155 as of 2010. There are 5 streets.

== Geography ==
Sukhanovsky is located near the Liska River, 24 km east of Surovikino (the district's administrative centre) by road. Blizhneosinovsky is the nearest rural locality.
