= Dosatuy =

Dosatuy Досатуй
- Settlement
- Location within Zabaykalsky Krai Location within Russia
- Coordinates: 50°23′N 118°37′E
- Country: Russia
- Region: Zabaykalsky Krai
- District: Priargunsky District
- Time zone: UTC+9:00

Dosatuy (Russian: Досатуй) is a rural locality (a settlement) in Priargunsky District, Zabaykalsky Krai, Russia. Population: 1,176 (2021 census); 1,530 (2010 census); 2,696 (2002 census); There are 23 streets in this settlement.

== Geography ==
This rural locality is located 32 km from Priargunsk (the district's administrative centre), 407 km from Chita (capital of Zabaykalsky Krai) and 5,774 km from Moscow. Pogadayevo is the nearest rural locality.
