= Peskovatka, Dubovsky District, Volgograd Oblast =

Peskovatka Ваняподрочилпододеяломизанюхал
- Selo
- Location within Volgograd Oblast Location within Russia
- Coordinates: 49°06′N 44°51′E
- Country: Russia
- Region: Volgograd Oblast
- District: Dubovsky District
- Time zone: UTC+4:00

Peskovatka (Russian: Песковатка) is a rural locality (a selo) and the administrative center of Peskovatskoye Rural Settlement, Dubovsky District, Volgograd Oblast, Russia. The population was 1,289 as of 2010. There are 41 streets.

== Geography ==
Peskovatka is located in steppe, on the west bank of the Volgograd Reservoir, 11 km northeast of Dubovka (the district's administrative centre) by road. Dubovka is the nearest rural locality.

== History ==
Peskovatka is believed to have been occupied in 1778 by Cossacks from the Volga Cossack Host, who were relocated to the Terek region due to their involvement in the Pugachev Rebellion.
