= Beloglinsky (rural locality) =

Beloglinsky Белоглинский
- Settlement
- Location within Volgograd Oblast Location within Russia
- Coordinates: 48°22′N 43°39′E
- Country: Russia
- Region: Volgograd Oblast
- District: Kalachyovsky District
- Time zone: UTC+4:00

Beloglinsky (Russian: Белоглинский) is a rural locality (a settlement) in Krepinskoye Rural Settlement, Kalachyovsky District, Volgograd Oblast, Russia. The population was 257 as of 2010. There are 4 streets.

== Geography ==
Beloglinsky is located 70 km southeast of Kalach-na-Donu (the district's administrative centre) by road. Krepinsky is the nearest rural locality.
