= Dauriya, Zabaykalsky Krai =

Dauriya Даурия
- Location of Dauriya
- Coordinates: 49°55′31″N 116°50′50″E
- Country: Russia
- Federal subject: Zabaykalsky Krai
- Founded: 1909
- Time zone: UTC+9 (MSK+6)
- Postal code(s): 674660
- OKTMO ID: 76612425101

Dauriya (Russian: Даурия) is a settlement in Zabaykalsky District of Zabaykalsky Krai in Russia, the administrative center of the Daursky Rural Settlement.

== History ==
Dauriya was originally founded in 1900 as a rail siding on the Trans-Baikal Railway, to which a settlement was attached in 1909. It was the location of the 1st Argun Regiment and 1st Transbaikal Cossack Battery of the 1st Separate Transbaikal Cossack Brigade of the Transbaikal Cossack Host until the Russian Civil War.

== Transport ==
Dauriya is the location of a station on the Trans-Baikal Railway, and is 50 kilometers (31 mi) southwest of Zabaykalsk, the nearest inhabited location.

== Demographics ==
According to the Russian Census of 2010, Dauriya had 3,850 inhabitants. According to the Russian Census of 2002, it had 4,242 inhabitants.
