= Jalainur District =

Jalainur 扎赉诺尔区 • ᠵᠠᠯᠠᠢᠨᠠᠭᠤᠷ ᠲᠣᠭᠤᠷᠢᠭ
- District

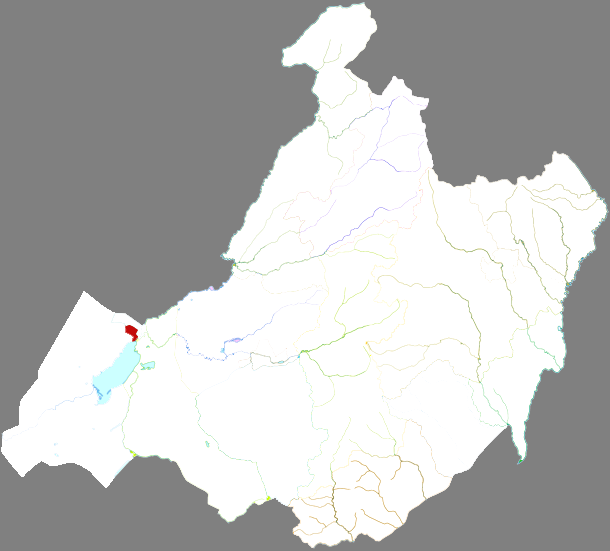
- Location of Jalainur District within Hulunbuir

- Location in Inner Mongolia Jalainur (China)
- Coordinates: 49°30′37″N 117°40′13″E
- Country: China
- Autonomous region: Inner Mongolia
- Prefecture-level city: Hulunbuir
- District seat: Subdistrict 3

Area
  - Total: 272 km^{2} (105 sq mi)

Population (2020)
  - Total: 84,424
  - Density: 310/km^{2} (804/sq mi)
- Time zone: UTC+8 (China Standard)
- Website: www.zhalainuoer.gov.cn

Jalainur District

Chinese name
- Simplified Chinese: 扎赉诺尔区
- Traditional Chinese: 扎賚諾爾區
Transcriptions
Standard Mandarin
- Hanyu Pinyin: Zhālàinuò'ěr Qū

Mongolian name
- Mongolian Cyrillic: Залайнуур тойрог
- Mongolian script: ᠵᠠᠯᠠᠢᠨᠠᠭᠤᠷ ᠲᠣᠭᠤᠷᠢᠭ
Transcriptions
- SASM/GNC: Jalainaɣur toɣoriɣ

Jalainur District or Zhalainuo'er District (Mongolian: ᠵᠠᠯᠠᠢᠨᠠᠭᠤᠷ ᠲᠣᠭᠤᠷᠢᠭ; Chinese: 扎赉诺尔区), an urban district under Manzhouli's administration, is listed as a district of Hulunbuir officially and located in the northeast of Inner Mongolia.

== Administrative divisions ==
Jalainur is made up of 5 subdistricts and 1 town.

Name	Simplified Chinese	Hanyu Pinyin	Mongolian (Hudum Script)	Mongolian (Cyrillic)	Administrative division code
Subdistricts
Subdistrict 3	第三街道	Dìsān Jiēdào	ᠭᠤᠷᠪᠠᠳᠤᠭᠠᠷ ᠵᠡᠭᠡᠯᠢ ᠭᠤᠳᠤᠮᠵᠢ	Гуравдугаар зээл гудамж	150703001
Subdistrict 1	第一街道	Dìyī Jiēdào	ᠨᠢᠭᠡᠳᠦᠭᠡᠷ ᠵᠡᠭᠡᠯᠢ ᠭᠤᠳᠤᠮᠵᠢ	Нэгдүгээр зээл гудамж	150703002
Subdistrict 2	第二街道	Dì'èr Jiēdào	ᠬᠣᠶᠠᠷᠳᠤᠭᠠᠷ ᠵᠡᠭᠡᠯᠢ ᠭᠤᠳᠤᠮᠵᠢ	Хоёрдугаар зээл гудамж	150703003
Subdistrict 4	第四街道	Dìsì Jiēdào	ᠳᠥᠷᠪᠡᠳᠦᠭᠡᠷ ᠵᠡᠭᠡᠯᠢ ᠭᠤᠳᠤᠮᠵᠢ	Дөрөвдүгээр зээл гудамж	150703004
Subdistrict 5	第五街道	Dìwǔ Jiēdào	ᠲᠠᠪᠤᠳᠤᠭᠠᠷ ᠵᠡᠭᠡᠯᠢ ᠭᠤᠳᠤᠮᠵᠢ	Тавдугаар зээл гудамж	150703005
Town
Lingquan Town	灵泉镇	Língquán Zhèn	ᠯᠢᠩ ᠴᠢᠦᠸᠠᠨ ᠪᠠᠯᠭᠠᠰᠤ	Лин чиован балгас	150703100

== Transportation ==
Jalainur's railway station is the midway stop between Manzhouli, the port city that stands close to the Russian border and Hailar District the seat of Hulunbuir. It is on the famous Manchuria branch of the Trans-Siberian express route and China National Highway 301.

== Tourist attractions ==
A scale model of Moscow's Cathedral of the Intercession of the Most Holy Theotokos on the Moat (popularly known as Saint Basil's Cathedral) has been built in Jalainur. The building houses a science museum.
