= 106th Rifle Division (1941 formation) =

106th Tank Division (July 10 - July 19, 1941) 106th Motorized Division (July 19, 1941 - August 28, 1941) 106th Rifle Division (August 28, 1941 - December 27, 1941)
- Active: 1941
- Country: Soviet Union
- Type: Motorized Infantry, Infantry
- Size: Division
- Engagements: Battle of Smolensk (1941); Yelnya offensive Battle of Moscow

Commanders
- Notable commanders: Col. Gersh Moiseevich Roitenberg; Col. Vasilii Petrovich Brynzov; Maj. Konstantin Sergeevich Monakhov

This 106th Rifle Division, based on the 221st Motorized Division, was first authorized as the 106th Tank Division, to be formed at Kharkiv, but due to a shortage of available tanks was quickly reorganized as the 106th Motorized Division. Under this designation it served in the early battles for Yelnya and the surrounding salient under command of Reserve Front's 24th Army, during which it lost most of its motor transport and began being referred to as the 106th Rifle Division. This became official on August 28, despite the existence of another 106th serving in the Crimea. The division suffered heavy losses in these battles while gaining little ground and when the campaign ended in early September it was moved to the Army's second echelon. The former 106th Motorized was surrounded and destroyed near Vyazma in mid-October, although it was not officially disbanded until December 27.

== 106th Motorized Division ==
The unit was authorized on July 10, 1941, as one of eight 100-series tank divisions to replace the many such divisions that had been destroyed in the frontier battles. The 221st Motorized was still en route from the Central Asian Military District as part of 28th Army's 27th Mechanized Corps when this order came. It was quickly found that, although Kharkiv was a main production center for armored vehicles, there weren't enough on hand to form the two tank regiments required by the 100-series shtat (table of organization and equipment). Therefore, on July 19 the 106th, given its complete lack of tanks, was redesignated as the 106th Mechanized-Motorized Division as it continued moving to the Smolensk region. Its basic order of battle was as follows:

- 1st Motorized Regiment
- 2nd Motorized Regiment
- 540th Rifle Regiment
- 106th Artillery Regiment

Col. Gersh Moiseevich Roitenberg had been in command of the 221st since it was formed, and he remained in command of the 106th.

By the beginning of August the division had been reassigned to the 24th Army of Reserve Front, and it would remain under these commands for the few months of its existence. This Front had come under command of Army Gen. G. K. Zhukov on July 20. The shock group of 28th Army was escaping from German encirclement near Roslavl on August 4/5, leading Zhukov and his chief of staff, Maj. Gen. P. I. Liapin, to send detailed instructions to the commander of 24th Army, Maj. Gen. K. I. Rakutin, in an effort to prevent any further such disasters. Among other directives, Rakutin was to ensure that "All of the artillery attached to 120th and 106th RDs must be ready to repel possible attacks by enemy motor-mechanized units from the south and southwest."

=== Battle of Yelnya ===
The town of Yelnya and its surrounding hills had been captured by elements of 2nd Panzer Group on July 19. This force was greatly overextended and was left in a deep salient that appeared vulnerable to Zhukov. He began his first offensive on August 1 with mixed results, which resulted in the following message at 0850 on August 3:

To the commanders of 19th, 103rd, 105th, 106th, and 120th Divisions...
The results of the one and one half day offensive against the enemy, which are occupying the El'nia region, do not respond to the requirements of my order. I demanded you advance no less than 8-10 kilometres toward El'nia in the initial days, [however] the majority of your units advanced 2-3 kilometres, and some did not even advance a single metre.

Unlike the 19th and 103rd, the 106th did not come under any direct criticism. At the time the division was under command of Colonel Alekseev. This offensive was suspended on August 4. At 0216 hours on August 6 Zhukov and Rakutin were sent orders by the STAVKA to attack and liquidate the salient. A number of moves were made to strengthen Reserve Front for this purpose. 24th Army now had the 106th Motorized, the 19th, 120th, 100th, 107th, 133rd, 178th Rifle, and the 6th Division of Narodnoe Opolchenie, in the front line. Four more divisions were in reserve. Zhukov issued his own orders to the Army at 2000:

24th Army's Mission -attaching exceptional significance to the El'nia region, the Stavka of the High Command makes Major General Comrade Rakutin personally responsible for destroying the El'nia grouping, reaching the Dobromino Station, Berniki, Babarykin, Kholm, Staroe Shcherbino, and Svetilovo line and linking up with the Western Front's left wing in the vicinity of Dobromino Station.

In addition to the forces listed above the Army would have a company of T-34 tanks, 184 combat aircraft, and four regiments of medium artillery. The 106th was to attack from the Maltsevo and Bolshaia Lipnia line, some 10km south of Yelnya, northward toward Bitiakovka and Leonidovo; it was on the left flank of the attacking forces and tied in to the 105th on its right. Rakutin was directed to send his operational plan to Reserve Front headquarters by noon on August 7. Despite all this planning, at 2130 hours Zhukov informed the STAVKA of his decision to postpone the offensive, in large part due to his realization of his forces' poor state of training.

==== First offensive ====
The offensive finally proceeded at dawn on August 8, but the main shock group (19th, 100th, 107th, and the nominal 102nd Tank Division), attacking from the north, made just minor gains against the 15th Infantry Division. On the same day the military commissar of 24th Army sent a message to the head of the 106th's political section which stated:

In 106th MD's units, during the period from 31 July through 8 August 1941, 45 men have been tried by military tribunal, of which 32 were tried for self-mutilation, 10 for desertion, 2 for violating security regulations, and one for negligence toward military service. I demand you establish such a high spirit of Soviet patriotism and soldierly duty that there will be no place for any instances of violation of discipline, desertion, crimes, or self-mutilation.

Zhukov also had his say about neglect or incompetence by his attacking commanders, including Alekseev, demanding that they make their subunit commanders aware that failure to advance would be considered cowardice, and that they report back on measures taken to this end. At his direction 24th Army continued making assaults nearly every day during August 12-20 without modifying the objectives but continually shuffling units, reprimanding and removing commanders and commissars or reducing them in rank. As one example, on August 18 Colonel Alekseev, "who has been repeatedly warned about his unsatisfactory fulfillment of combat mission," was replaced by Col. Vasilii Petrovich Brynzov, who had previously led the 158th Rifle Division. Soviet losses were heavy but German casualties were also high, and by mid-August the commander of XX Army Corps, Gen. F. Materna, appealed for help from Army Group Center, stating "[h]e had only one battalion in reserve" and "El'nia could not be held in the long term."

==== Second offensive ====
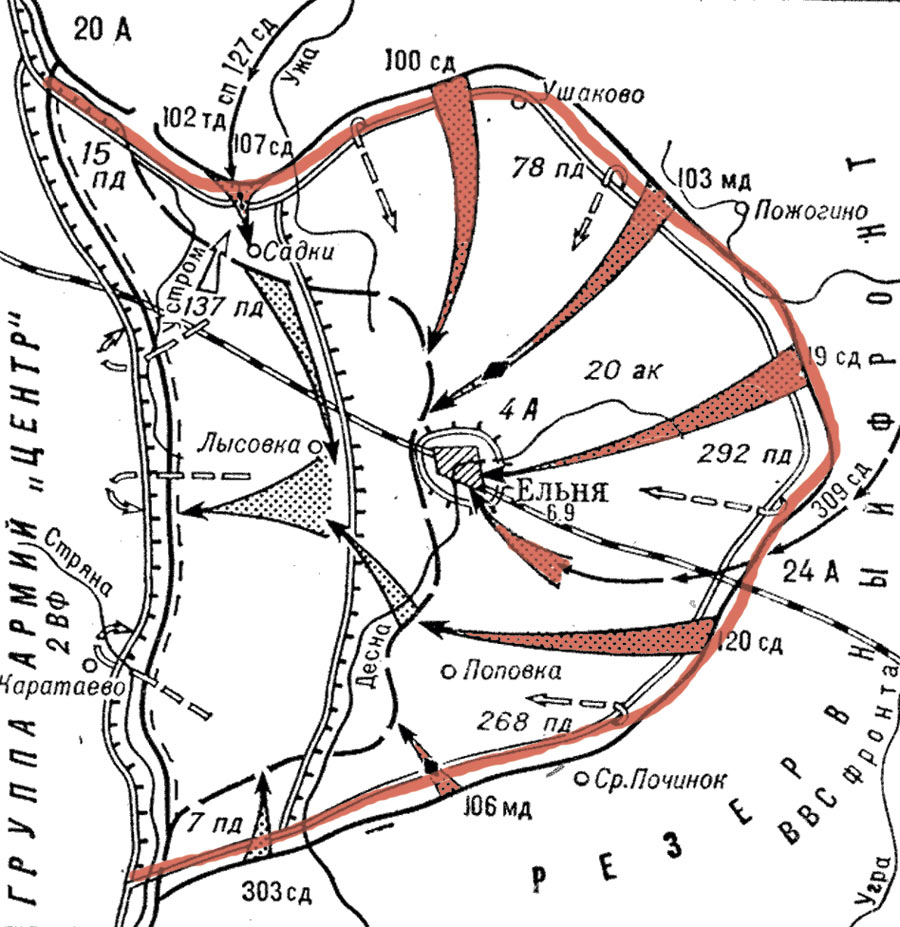
Battle of Yelnya, August 30 - September 8, 1941. Note initial position of the 106th.

At 0445 hours on August 21, Zhukov finally informed Stalin that continuing the offensive would be futile without pausing for further rest, refitting, and training. Stalin approved later that day. On August 28 Colonel Brynzov was severely wounded just as he was about to be relieved of his command; he would never lead another unit in the field but after his release from hospital and despite two other hospitalizations he served in a variety of posts, being promoted to major general in October 1943 and retiring in 1948. In a sign of the lack of senior officers available he was replaced by Maj. Konstantin Sergeevich Monakhov. On the same day it was officially acknowledged that the 106th could no longer be considered a motorized division and it was officially redesignated as the 106th Rifle Division, "which meant that there were then two 106th Rifle Divisions in the Soviet army on different parts of the front at the same time!" This led to some confusion to German intelligence. The 1940 formation of the 106th was currently serving in 9th Rifle Corps of 51st Army in the Crimea.

On August 30 Reserve Front began its new offensive against the salient, which would involve 24th and 43rd Armies. The 106th was positioned on a line from Striana to Lipnia to Zadnyi Pochinok, now facing the center of the 268th Infantry Division of XX Corps. 24th Army had over 103,000 personnel on strength, greatly outnumbering the 40,000 of XX Corps and the attached 137th Infantry Division, but had only 35 tanks. In the week before the offensive was renewed the 106th received three march battalions of replacements numbering a total of some 3,000 men, but few of these were junior officers or NCOs. The southern shock group consisted of the 106th, the 303rd Rifle Division to its left, the 305th Gun Artillery Regiment, and a battalion of Katyusha rocket launchers. Altogether the group had 240 guns and mortars and six Katyushas. The objective was the village of Leonov on the Yelnya–Pochinok road. It would be covered on the right by the 120th Division.

According to Rakutin's plan the 106th would strike the left wing on the 268th Infantry on a 2km-wide sector south of Maltsevo before pushing north to take the strongpoints there and at Popovka. Once the German forward defenses were pierced the northern and southern shock groups would link up at the Yelnya–Pochinok road to encircle and destroy the bulk of XX Corps. The 106th would form part of the inner line of encirclement. Apart from the shock groups the remainder of 24th Army would conduct pinning attacks. The offensive started promptly at 0700 hours on August 30 in heavy fog, after a well-planned artillery preparation using some 640 guns, mortars, and Katyushas. The 303rd, with the 540th Regiment of the 106th attached, was able to advance 2km during the day, reaching the outskirts of Skokova while the 540th took Stroina in the evening. Meawhile the 106th reached the approaches to Bolshaya and Malaya Lipka before encountering extensive minefields which brought the advance to a halt after covering several hundred metres. Few men were killed but 108 were wounded.

After spending the previous day observing the attacks, at 0230 hours on August 31 Zhukov and Rakutin ordered them to continue at 0700 against the same objectives, following an artillery raid of 10 minutes. Zhukov's ire had been raised by the ineffectiveness of his artillery and issued an order entitled "Concerning the Unsatisfactory Organization of Work for the Care and Economic Use of its Artillery Systems by 24th Army," in which he specifically criticized the 100th, 106th, 120th, and 127th Rifle Divisions for failing to exploit "the full potential of their artillery." Rakutin was to correct the deficiencies immediately. In the day's after action report the 106th was said to have "achieved scant progress in heavy fighting for Malaia and Bol'shaia Lipka... but seized several buildings on the southern outskirts of Bol'shaia Lipka." Zhukov was "livid" at the lack of results but the OKH was becoming increasingly concerned about the situation.

Over September 1-3 the 106th remained bogged down where it had been on August 31. However, the northern shock group had made marginally more progress and the German position was increasingly untenable, leading to Army Group Center ordering the phased withdrawal of XX Corps late on September 3, to continue until September 6. Zhukov, probably anticipating this move, directed the two shock groups to exploit toward a linkup to prevent a significant number of German troops escaping the trap. The withdrawal proceeded in an orderly manner on September 4 as the encirclement was never completed. Although later Soviet accounts stated the two shock groups were just "hundreds of metres" apart, the gap was in fact some 8km wide. On this day and the next the 106th remained stuck south of the Lipkas despite the withdrawal by now being largely complete. On September 14 Reserve Front reported on the state of 24th Army two days later, in which it stated the Army was short some 30,000 active soldiers (riflemen, machine gunners, mortar crews) and the 106th had only 622 men in its rifle regiments.

== Operation Typhoon ==
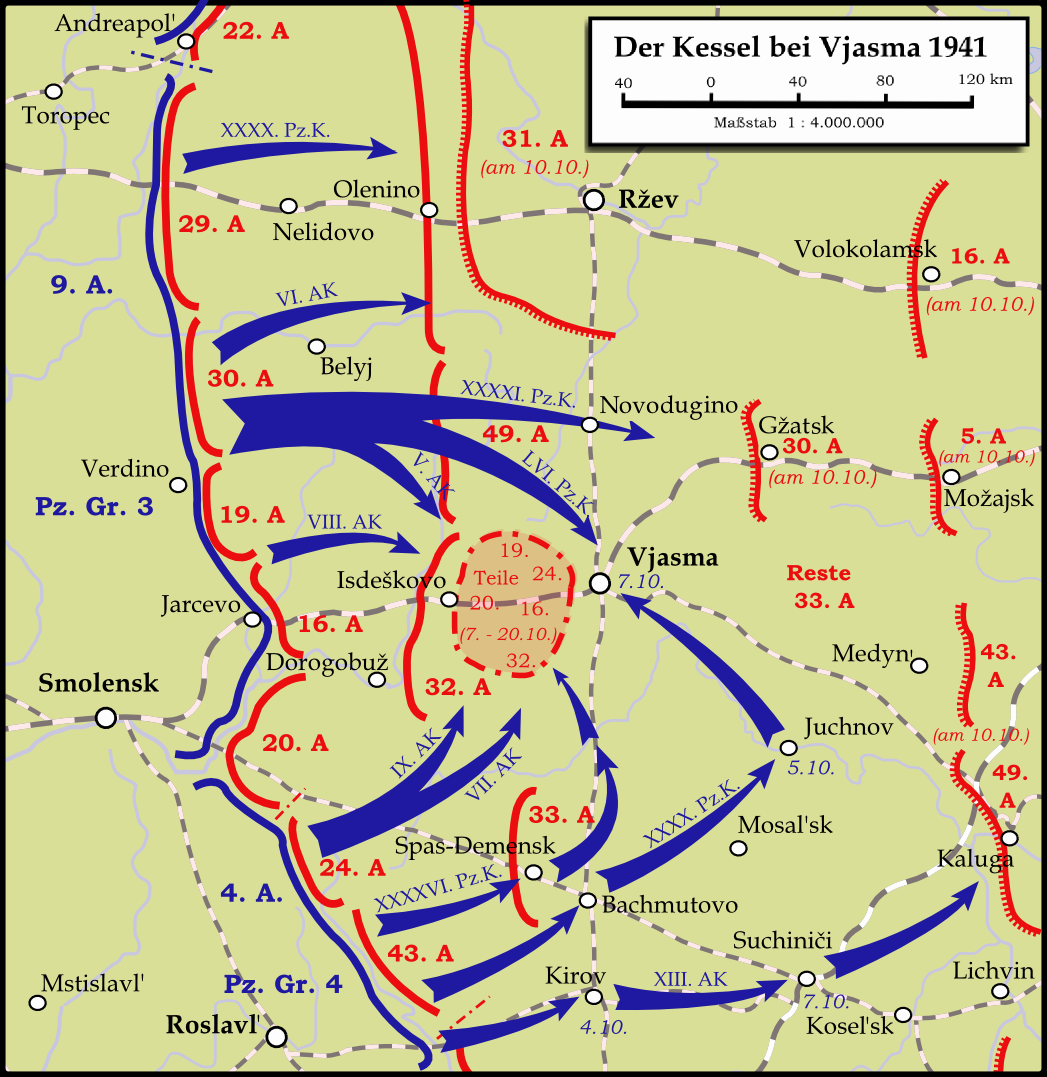
Operation Typhoon (northern sector). Note initial position of 24th Army.

On September 13 Zhukov departed Reserve Front for Leningrad, and was replaced by Marshal S. M. Budyonny. The Front contained six armies, essentially the same since the end of the Yelnya campaign. 24th and 43rd Armies were in first echelon between Western and Bryansk Fronts on a front of 108km with a total of 10 rifle divisions. Three of the remaining armies were deployed in second echelon behind Western Front on a line from Vyazma to Rzhev, while 33rd Army backed up the 24th and 43rd. The 106th was in the Army's second echelon while the first echelon 19th, 103rd, and 309th Rifle Divisions continued to make futile attacks against German positions until September 30, losing 1,825 killed or wounded in 10 days. Overall the Army was responsible for a 40km-wide sector, and also had a combined arms reserve consisting of the 160th Rifle Division (former 6th Opolchenie), two tank brigades, and two antitank regiments. The German buildup to a new offensive was apparent to 24th Army's intelligence as indicated by a September 26 report:

The enemy is shifting units from the El'nia axis to the Roslavl'-Pochinok direction, and by this is striving to create a superiority of force, plainly in readiness for an offensive within the next few days on the Roslavl' axis.

Budyonny considered 33rd Army to be an adequate support for his two front-line Armies.

Operation Typhoon began on this sector at dawn on October 2 with air strikes and artillery bombardments, making frequent use of smoke to create confusion about the chosen breakthrough sectors. The 4th Panzer Group attacked at the boundary between 43rd Army and Bryansk Front. 24th Army, facing just the IX Army Corps, saw little action this day. In the afternoon, Budyonny proposed to use three rifle divisions of 32nd Army, along with 24th Army's second echelon 106th and the 144th Tank Brigade, to, "depending on the situation," counterattack either toward Ivanovka and Novo-Sloveni then south along the Desna River, or toward Khoteevka and Lezhnevka and then along the Shiutsa River. This was to be under the coordination of the commander of 32nd Army, Maj. Gen. S. V. Vishnevskii. This proposal entirely glossed over the crisis on his left wing where the defense had been completely breached by 1700 hours. In addition, Vishnevskii's three divisions were 90-100km away from the proposed assembly area for the counterstroke.

By the end of the day, after an advance of 40km, the leading elements of 4th Panzer Group were attacking the divisions of 33rd Army. This feat had been facilitated by extensive support from Luftflotte 2; at 2000 hours six German aircraft attacked General Rakutin's headquarters. At 1130 on October 3 German 4th Army reported to Army Group Center that IX Corps was 4km from Yelnya and facing strong counterattacks. Prisoners, of which 2,500 had been taken, reported that they'd been ordered to "hold out unconditionally." By this time Budyonny had grasped the reality facing his 43rd Army and issued orders for it to withdraw to a new line on the Shuitsa and Snopot Rivers, 35-40km behind the original front. However, communications from Reserve Front to that Army and the 33rd had been lost. As of October 4 the 24th was still holding its ground, which was putting it farther and farther in the German rear, some 100-130km from Vyazma. The next day it became clear that the major German forces had turned to the north, but Budyonny had no forces of his own available to hinder this advance.

=== Retreat and disbandment ===
As early as October 3 Army Group Center was calculating that up to 70 Red Army divisions and brigades could end up encircled in and around Vyazma and Bryansk. By October 5 the 4th and 3rd Panzer Groups were just 45km from Vyazma, with the 4th reaching Yukhnov with its forward units. At this time the 19th and 106th were still fighting doggedly to hold on to Yelnya. Due to the constant breakdowns in communications neither Reserve nor Western Fronts had any clear idea of the situation at the front, and low level commanders were forced to act blindly. At 0555 hours on October 6 Budyonny issued Combat Order No. 34/op which noted that the Desna line had been penetrated and the offensive continued to push to the east and northeast. Among the assignments he gave to his forces the 106th and 103rd Divisions, plus the two tank brigades and a howitzer artillery regiment, were identified as the Front reserve, which was absurd given the 106th's current position. At 1140, after further examination of the situation, the 19th and 103rd were authorized to break contact and withdraw toward Spas-Demensk and Vyazma, but nothing was said about the 106th. At this point Budyonny disappeared, finally being found by Zhukov outside Maloyaroslavets on October 8.

What remained of 24th Army began its withdrawal in the direction of Volochek–Barsuki–Ushakovo–Putkovo–Piatnitsa. Two divisions covered the withdrawal. Compared with some other armies of Reserve and Western Front the 24th faced more difficult circumstances and was less organized. Withdrawal routes became clogged with vehicles, heavy weapons, and tanks. Panic became manifest under German air attacks. Division commissar K. K. Abramov of the Army's political section, stated:

On the morning of 7 October the headquarters of the 106th Motorized Division, having received an order to withdraw to Semlevo, together with the motor pool and part of one of the regiments began a withdrawal toward Dorogobuzh... Dorogobuzh by this time was already partially occupied by Germans holding the eastern outskirts, while the rest of the town was under German mortar fire... Along the same Dorogobuzh–Semlevo–Viaz'ma road, all of the 20th Army and part of the 19th Army were retreating. Therefore units of the 24th Army followed two routes of withdrawal: the headquarters of the 103rd Motorized, the 106th Rifle, the 309th Rifle and the 19th Rifle took the Dorogobuzh–Semlevo road.

Rakutin had his headquarters in the Volochek area and was communicating entirely by radio. Abramov goes on to recount that a logjam of artillery and vehicles built up at the crossing over the Osma River at Dorogobuzh but the movement proceeded in orderly fashion, although the column had the vehicles in front while the infantry trailed behind; most regiments had only 50-100 combat-effective troops remaining.

Yelnya fell on October 7, the same day as Vyazma. 24th Army was now encircled. At 1600 hours a defense of Semlevo was organized to allow the forces moving from Dorogobuzh to pass through and organize for a breakout. Major Bashilkin, the commander of the 106th Artillery Regiment, along with the howitzer regiment of the 103rd, were covering the withdrawal with fire. This defense was held until midnight. Overnight, Abramov and the 24th Army chief of staff, Maj. Gen. Kondratev, proposed that 32nd Army organize a joint operation to break out toward Vyazma. However, the 32nd was under orders to slip through independently north of that city. Between 1700 and 1900 on October 8 Rakutin received orders to subordinate his forces to the commander of 20th Army, Lt. Gen. F. A. Yershakov. This officer would organize a breakout on the front Vyazma–Volosta–Piatnitsa, while the 24th Army was on the front Volosta–Piatnitsa–Ugra Station. Once through German lines the Soviet forces were intended to reach Gzhatsk. According to Abramov, by this time 24th Army headquarters had communications only with the 106th and 19th Divisions. Overnight, German forces reached the northern outskirts of Semlevo.

By the morning of October 9 the 106th, along with many of the Army's other retreating elements, began to arrive in the area of Panfilovo and to the south. The part of the headquarters led by General Kondratev was soon pocketed, and Rakutin went missing. Kondratev would reach Soviet lines on October 18 with 180 men of the 106th, 19th and 139th Rifle Divisions. While individuals and small groups of the 106th would continue to escape over the coming weeks, the division was effectively wiped out, although in common with most of the units destroyed in Typhoon it lingered on the Red Army order of battle until finally stricken on December 27.
