= 221st Rifle Division =

221st Motorized Division (March 11 – July 15, 1941) 221st Rifle Division (April 16 – November 1, 1942) 221st Rifle Division (June 29, 1943 – October 1945)
- Active: 1941–1945
- Country: Soviet Union
- Branch: Red Army
- Type: Infantry
- Role: Motorized Infantry
- Size: Division
- Engagements: World War II; Operation Barbarossa; First Battle of Smolensk; Case Blue; Battle of Stalingrad; Donbas Strategic Offensive; Melitopol Offensive; Proskurov-Chernivtsi Offensive; Vyborg–Petrozavodsk offensive; East Prussian offensive; Battle of Königsberg; Samland offensive; Invasion of Manchuria
- Decorations: Order of the Red Banner (2nd formation); Order of Suvorov (2nd formation)
- Battle honours: Mariupol (2nd formation); Khingan (2nd formation)

Commanders
- Notable commanders: Col. Gersh Moiseevich Roitenberg; Col. Pavel Ivanovich Bunyashin; Col. Ivan Ivanovich Blazhevich; Maj. Gen. Vladislav Nikolaevich Kushnarenko

The 221st Rifle Division was formed as an infantry division of the Red Army after a motorized division of that same number was redesignated about four weeks after the start of the German invasion of the Soviet Union. After several further redesignations the division, which had always been a rifle division for all intents and purposes, was destroyed during Operation Typhoon in October 1941.

The first official 221st Rifle Division was formed in the spring of 1942 in the Ural Military District from a mix of several Central Asian nationalities. It arrived in Stalingrad Front in late August and was immediately thrown into the offensives that were attempting to break through the German corridor from the Don River to the city in order to relieve 62nd Army. The Kotluban offensives were expensive failures and by the end of October the division was so badly depleted that it was disbanded.

A new 221st was formed in 5th Shock Army of Southern Front in late June 1943, based on a rifle brigade. After assisting in the breakthrough of the German defenses along the Mius River it advanced through the southeastern Ukraine and won a battle honor for the liberation of Mariupol. From here the division followed an unusual combat path, serving as a sort of utility unit on several sectors of the front, first west of Kiev where it won the Order of the Red Banner, then well to the north as part of 7th and 21st Armies in the final offensives against Finland. It then joined 39th Army in 3rd Belorussian Front, taking part in the campaigns in East Prussia in 1945 winning a further decoration in the process. Before the German surrender it began moving with this Army across the Soviet Union to serve in the invasion of Manchuria in August, where it won a second battle honor. Within months of the Japanese capitulation it was disbanded in the far east.

== 221st Motorized Division ==
The division began forming in March 1941, as part of the prewar buildup of Soviet mechanized forces in the Central Asian Military District as part of the 27th Mechanized Corps. It was based on the 19th Mountain Cavalry Order of Lenin Division (until 1936 the 6th Uzbek Mountain Cavalry Division). Once formed its order of battle was as follows:

- 671st Motorized Rifle Regiment
- 695th Motorized Rifle Regiment
- 138th Tank Regiment (until July 29, 1941)
- 659th Artillery Regiment
- 47th Antitank Battalion
- 236th Antiaircraft Battalion
- 296th Reconnaissance Battalion
- 379th Light Engineering Battalion
- 595th Signal Battalion
- 219th Artillery Park Battalion
- 366th Medical/Sanitation Battalion
- 693rd Motor Transport Battalion
- 167th Repair and Restoration Battalion
- 59th Regulatory Company
- 479th Field Postal Station
- 734th Field Office of the State Bank

Col. Gersh Moiseevich Roitenberg, who had been in command of the 19th Mountain Cavalry since January, remained in command of the 221st. Although his cavalrymen were well-trained and capable peacetime soldiers they had very little experience with tanks or other motor vehicles; in fact the 138th Regiment was never completely formed and never received any tanks, and the inadequate number of trucks provided from the civilian economy for the motorized regiments and other elements were mostly not serviceable for war conditions. On June 22 the Corps (221st Motorized, 9th and 53rd Tank Divisions, 31st Motorcycle Regiment) were still in Central Asian Military District, based at Samarkand, and on June 25 received orders to begin entraining for the west.

=== Redesignation and Disbandment ===
9th Tanks began moving two days later and arrived at Voronezh on July 8 with the remainder of the Corps following. By July 10 the Corps had been assigned to 28th Army in the Reserve of the Supreme High Command. Given the severe tank losses the Red Army had already suffered the STAVKA now decided to disband all unengaged mechanized corps and between July 11–15, as they continued moving toward Kirov, the 9th Tanks was converted to the 104th Tank Division (based on the new shtat for 100-series tank divisions), the 53rd Tanks to the 105th Tank Division and the 221st to the 106th Tank Division. From Kirov the three divisions proceeded to the Spas-Demensk region, still under 28th Army. On July 19 the 106th, given its complete lack of tanks, was redesignated as the 106th Mechanized-Motorized Division as it continued moving to the Smolensk region. Under this designation the division's order of battle became the 1st and 2nd Motorized Regiments, 540th Rifle Regiment, and 106th Artillery Regiment. By August 28 all further pretence was dropped and the division became the 106th Rifle Division in 24th Army of Reserve Front. This was awkward as there was already a 106th Rifle in service, but the situation was resolved about six weeks later when the former 221st Motorized was surrounded and destroyed north of Spas-Demensk in early October during Operation Typhoon.

== 1st Formation ==
The first 221st Rifle Division began forming in March 1942 at Krasnoufimsk in the Ural Military District. At this time its personnel were noted as being roughly 25 percent Russian, with nearly all of the remainder being of Uzbek, Kazakh and Kirghiz nationalities. When it completed forming its order of battle was as follows:

- 625th Rifle Regiment
- 671st Rifle Regiment
- 695th Rifle Regiment
- 659th Artillery Regiment
- 422nd Antitank Battalion
- 476th Antiaircraft Battery
- 296th Reconnaissance Company
- 379th Sapper Battalion
- 595th Signal Battalion
- 366th Medical/Sanitation Battalion
- 188th Chemical Defense (Anti-gas) Company
- 542nd Motor Transport Battalion
- 358th Field Bakery
- 855th Divisional Veterinary Hospital
- 1844th Field Postal Station (later 1969th)
- 1163rd Field Office of the State Bank

Col. Pavel Ivanovich Bunyashin, who had previously served as chief of staff of the 18th Rifle Division, was appointed to command on April 16; he would lead the division for the existence of this formation. In May it was assigned to the 8th Reserve Army in the Reserve of the Supreme High Command, and soon began moving toward Stalingrad. It was north of the city on August 24 when the headquarters of 8th Reserve was used to form 66th Army in Stalingrad Front.

=== Kotluban Offensives ===
On August 21 the XIV Panzer Corps struck eastward from a bridgehead over the Don River and by the 23rd had reached the Volga and the northern outskirts of Stalingrad in some strength. This seemingly vulnerable corridor, which passed near the village of Kotluban and its railway station, would attract Soviet counterattacks into November. The 221st did not join 66th Army but was instead assigned to the new 24th Army which was formed on August 27, also in Stalingrad Front, and deployed somewhat farther to the west, north of the corridor.

The division went into action at 1500 hours on September 5. It faced:

... terrain that was billiard-table flat, treeless, and cut with numerous balkas and smaller dry streambeds and gullies, which offered ideal concealment for the defending infantry, tanks, and supporting artillery, and funneled [the] attacking forces into deadly fire sacks in between numerous German strongpoints.

24th Army attacked well dug-in elements of VIII Army Corps west of Kuzmichi; the 221st, flanked by the 173rd and 207th Rifle Divisions, drove in the German security line and reached the forward edge of the main defense along the northwestern slopes of Hill 93.1–the village 4 km southwest of Samofalovka–the northwestern slopes of Hill 13.4, which was a marginal return for the commitment of three fresh divisions. This offensive, which had begun two days earlier, was utterly stalled, although its mentor, Army Gen. G. K. Zhukov, would not shut it down until September 13.

==== Second Kotluban Offensive ====
The second Kotluban offensive was set to begin on September 18. The Front commander, Col. Gen. A. I. Yeryomenko, chose a 17 km-wide attack sector from 564 km Station to the Kotluban Balka, in part because it was defended by German infantry, rather than the mobile troops which had defeated his earlier attempt. This was the sector held by 24th Army which he recognized as already weakened to the point that it could not spearhead the effort by itself. As one example, on September 15 the 221st was noted as already reduced to 5,724 men. Yeryomenko therefore regrouped his forces and the division now became part of 1st Guards Army, although remaining on much the same sector as before. Supported by 340 tanks, the Army was to break through the defense at the junction of VIII Corps and XIV Panzer Corps and exploit southward along the Borodkin–Nadezhda axis to link up with the isolated 62nd Army in the Gumrak region. The Army commander, Maj. Gen. K. S. Moskalenko, chose to hold the 221st and 207th Divisions, along with 4th Tank Corps, in his second echelon in order to reinforce success and fend off counterattacks during the advance. The offensive began at 0700 hours following a 90-minute artillery preparation that was largely ineffective due to the depth of the defense. The first echelon managed to gain up to 3 km in places but then ground to a halt in front of the main defense lines as German reserves began arriving. At 1400 Moskalenko ordered his second echelon into the fight to maintain the momentum of the assault but by the time it arrived it was too late to halt the German counterattacks, backed by up to 50 tanks, that were sweeping the 308th and 316th Rifle Divisions from the slopes and crest of Hill 154.2 and effectively routing them. In the intense fighting of September 18 and 19 1st Guards Army suffered 36,000 casualties from its initial 123,000 personnel.

After a pause for reinforcements and a minor shift in objectives Moskalenko was ordered to renew the offensive on September 23. The 221st and 207th Divisions formed the first echelon of a shock group that was to assault the defenses of 60th Motorized Division's 9th Machine Gun Battalion at 564 km Station. This position changed hands three times but was in the division's hands by the end of September 24. Despite this minor success the overall offensive had ground to a halt two days later, primarily due to German air strikes and local counterattacks. Yeryomenko persisted in ordering his armies to attack as late as October 4, but this achieved little except attrition and a distraction for the German command from the fighting in the city itself.

By this time the 1st Guards Army had been transferred to the new Don Front. Later in October the 221st returned to 24th Army in the same Front, but on November 1 it was officially disbanded due to excessive losses. Colonel Bunyashin went on to command the 84th Rifle Division for most of the remainder of the war, being promoted to the rank of major general on September 1, 1943, and after nearly ten years in the training establishment ended his career as a military attaché to the Democratic Republic of Vietnam from 1954 to 1958.

== 2nd Formation ==
A new 221st was formed in 5th Shock Army of Southern Front on June 29, 1943, based on the 2nd formation of the 79th Rifle Brigade.

=== 79th Rifle Brigade ===
This brigade was formed between August and October 1942 in the Central Asian Military District as a standard rifle brigade. It remained in the region until December when it was shipped north and west to Astrakhan on the Caspian Sea and assigned to 28th Army in Southern Front. This Army was responsible for screening a vast territory between the lower Volga and the Caucasus against the meagre forces the Axis had committed to this distant region. After the German defeat at Stalingrad the brigade advanced with its Army through the Caucasus steppe to the eastern Donbas by February 1943, facing the defenses along the Mius-Front. In April it was moved to 5th Shock in the same Front and in preparation for the summer offensive it was reinforced to the rifle division shtat of December 10, 1942.

Col. Ivan Ivanovich Blazhevich (born Ionas Ionasovich Blazhevichus, Polish by nationality), who had previously served as chief of staff of the 96th Guards Rifle Division, was appointed to command the day the division formed. Its order of battle remained almost identical to that of the 1st Formation, except the 511th Self-Propelled Artillery Battalion (SU-76s) would be added before the Manchurian campaign, the 595th Signal Battalion would be replaced by the 1455th Signal Company, the field bakery was renumbered as the 385th, and the field postal station and field office of the state bank were also renumbered.

== Into Ukraine ==
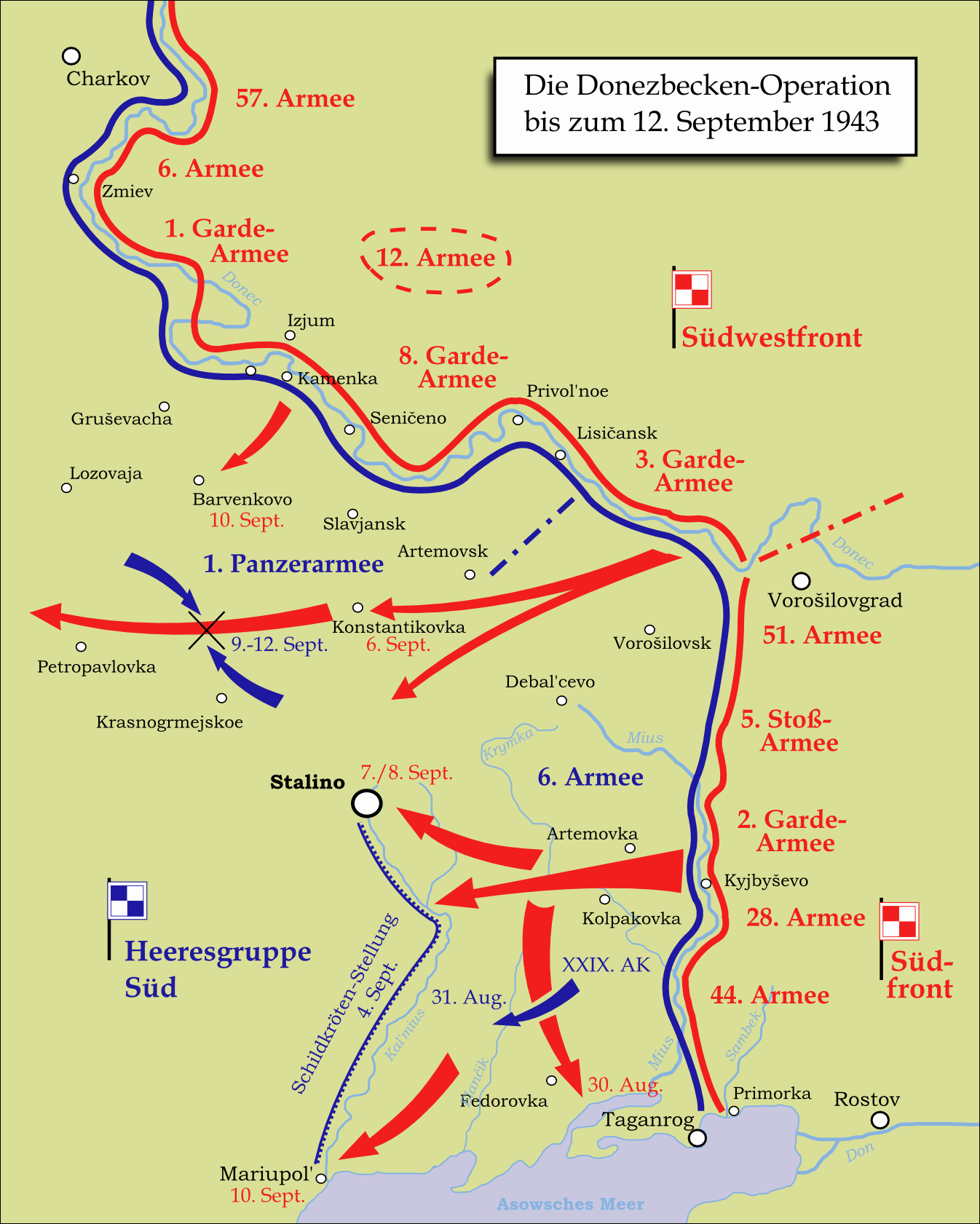
Donbas Offensive Operation, August 1943

Southern Front launched its first effort to break the Mius line on July 17 as the Battle of Kursk was winding down, but after a great deal of costly back-and-forth fighting finally suspended the effort on July 27, although German counterattacks would continue until August 2. A renewed offensive began on August 13 and although Southwestern Front to the north was initially unable to penetrate the front of 1st Panzer Army south of Izium, Southern Front broke through the reconstructed German 6th Army beginning on August 18. 5th Shock Army, with an overwhelming concentration, especially of artillery, on a narrow front, penetrated 7 km behind the front through a 3 km-wide gap. Under the light of a full moon the Army spread out north and south behind the 6th Army's front. German efforts to close the gap on August 20 made some initial progress but failed due to a strong Soviet reaction. By August 23 1st Panzer Army was also in trouble with its army corps south of Izium reduced to a combat strength of just 5,800 men and unable to hold a continuous line. On the 31st Field Marshal E. von Manstein was finally authorized to withdraw both armies to the Kalmius River, effectively beginning the race to the Dniepr. Later in August the 221st was transferred to the 44th Army, still in Southern Front. At the time this Army had only the 221st, the 130th Rifle Division, and the 1st Guards Fortified Region under command as infantry forces. As the advance continued the division was awarded its first honorific:

MARIUPOL - ...221st Rifle Division (Col. Blazhevich, Ivan Ivanovich)... By order of the Supreme High Command of 10 September 1943 and a commendation in Moscow, the troops who participated in the battles for the liberation of Mariupol are given a salute of 12 artillery salvoes from 124 guns.

Later in the month it returned to 28th Army, still in Southern Front (as of October 20, 4th Ukrainian Front.) During October it was subordinated to 37th Rifle Corps in the same Army. In November, following the Melitopol operation which isolated the Axis forces in the Crimea, 37th Corps was briefly reassigned to 3rd Guards Army but on December 1 the division was moved to the Reserve of the Supreme High Command and began moving north. While in the Reserve it was assigned to 67th Rifle Corps in 69th Army, but when it returned to the front in that Corps on January 29, 1944, it was assigned to 38th Army in 1st Ukrainian Front. Colonel Blazhevich had left command of the division to his deputy commander, Col. Vladislav Nikolaevich Kushnarenko on December 26; the former would go on to command the 99th Guards Rifle Division and be promoted to the rank of major general on November 2, 1944, but was mortally wounded by a land mine explosion in Austria on April 23, 1945, five days before becoming a Hero of the Soviet Union. Kushnarenko would lead the 221st, apart from one brief break, for the duration of the war, reaching the rank of major general on September 13, 1944.

=== Proskurov-Chernivtsi Offensive ===
By the end of January the lines between 1st Ukrainian Front and 1st Panzer Army had stabilized north of Vinnytsia. The offensive was renewed on March 4. 38th Army was on the left (south) flank of the Front and its initial objective was Vinnytsia, after which it was to continued to advance southwest toward Zhmerynka, which had been designated as a Festung (fortress) by Hitler. The former was liberated on March 20 and three days later the 221st was recognized for its role with the award of the Order of the Red Banner. During the late March fighting around the encircled 1st Panzer Army the division was moved to the 101st Rifle Corps, still in 38th Army and several weeks later was reassigned to the 94th Rifle Corps in 60th Army. On June 4 the division again entered the Reserve of the Supreme High Command and began moving northward.

== Vyborg–Petrozavodsk Offensive ==
The 221st, along with the rest of 94th Corps, arrived in eastern Karelia on June 15 and was immediately assigned to the 7th Army in Karelian Front. Leningrad Front had begun its offensive against Finland on the Karelian Isthmus on June 10 and 7th Army was set to begin its own Svir–Petrozavodsk offensive on June 20 on the Olonets sector. Given its unfamiliarity with the terrain it faced the Corps was used in a follow-on role. The Finnish V and VI Corps evacuated a large bridgehead south of the Svir on June 18, evading the first blows of the Soviet operation and thereafter engaging in a stubborn retreat against an aggressive pursuit; Petrozavodsk fell on June 30 and by July 10 the Finnish forces were in the 'U'-line where the offensive paused.

Later in July the 94th Corps was again reassigned, now to 21st Army in Leningrad Front, located on the Karelian Isthmus. By this time the Soviets had gained most of its objectives in the war against Finland and by the middle of the month was removing its more powerful units, especially armor, for re-employment elsewhere. Although some fighting continued until the September 19 armistice, the Red Army was largely on the defensive. On October 1 most of 21st Army, including the 221st and its Corps, was removed to the Reserve of the Supreme High Command, where it remained into November.

== East Prussian Offensives ==
After a brief assignment to 3rd Belorussian Front in late November the 21st Army returned to the Reserve of the Supreme High Command by December 1. Later that month 94th Corps returned to that Front where it joined the 39th Army; the 221st would remain in this Army into peacetime. At the outset of the final offensive into Germany on January 12, 1945, the Corps consisted of the 124th, 221st and 358th Rifle Divisions. In the plan for the offensive 39th Army was on the right flank of 3rd Belorussian Front, south of the Neman River. 94th Rifle Corps was in the first echelon with 5th Guards Rifle Corps, facing a breakthrough sector 8 km wide, with the immediate objective of destroying the enemy forces in the Pilkallen area, before advancing westward and capturing Tilsit by the end of the fifth day. The offensive began on schedule and made immediate progress. However, on the 14th German forces launched heavy counterattacks along the front while the Soviet advance ran into deeply echeloned defenses. 39th Army beat off as many as 15 such attacks by up to a battalion in strength, backed by 8-16 tanks apiece. The 124th was committed into battle from behind the 358th's right flank, broke into Pilkallen and seized the railroad station, the only significant advance of the day.

The Army commander, Lt. Gen. I. I. Lyudnikov, ordered the Corps to speed up its attack on the morning of January 18, in the general direction of Raudonatchen. By this time it was clear that 39th Army was making the best progress among the armies of the Front, and the 1st Tank Corps was moved in to exploit. In its wake, the 94th Corps reached the line of the Inster River near Raudonatchen, advancing as much as 20 km. This advance prepared the way for elements of 43rd Army to break into Tilsit in the afternoon of January 19, while the 94th Corps advanced to the Tilsit-Insterburg railroad. On January 22 the 221st was on the march and its lead elements were near Schwentoie, while 39th Army overall reached the Curonian Lagoon along the line of the Deime River, splitting the German defense. After hard fighting over the next day this river line was forced, and the way was open to Königsberg. In recognition of its role in penetrating the defenses of East Prussia the division would be awarded the Order of Suvorov, 2nd Degree, on February 19. On the same date the 671st Rifle Regiment would receive the Order of the Red Banner for its part in the battles for Tapiau, Allenburg, and other towns.

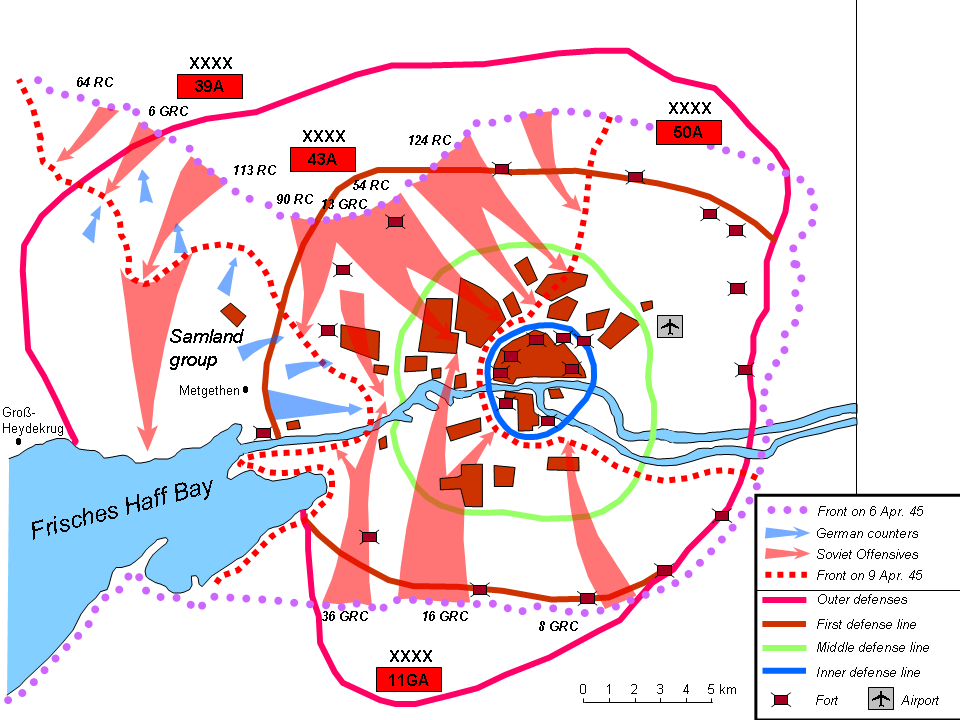
Battle Of Königsberg. Note the 94th Rifle Corps is misidentified as the 64th.

The right-flank armies of 3rd Belorussian Front were tasked with capturing the city, and on January 27 they had reached its outskirts. 94th Corps, in the Schoenwalde area, was counterattacked twice, with heavy artillery support. Despite this, it broke through the fortified defenses north of the Alter Pregel River, took the strongpoints of Gamsau and Praddau, and on the following day reached the fortifications of the city itself, becoming involved in stubborn fighting. And here the sector in the Samland Peninsula west of Königsberg remained static until early April.

On February 9 the 39th Army was transferred to 1st Baltic Front, which was redesignated as the Zemland Group of Forces on February 24, returning to 3rd Belorussian Front. By this time the division was badly understrength. The artillery regiment, usually the last part of a division to be reduced by losses, still had nine batteries in three battalions but each battery had only two 76mm cannon and one 122mm howitzer. Mixing the howitzers and cannon in the same batteries meant that the artillery was being used exclusively for direct fire support of the infantry, which probably added to the artillery's losses to enemy fire. Col. Fyodor Nikitovich Antroshenkov took over the 221st on March 5, but General Kushnarenko returned to command on April 2. During late February and early March the division was part of the 113th Rifle Corps, but it then returned to 94th Corps, where it stayed for the rest of its existence.

=== Battle of Königsberg ===
When the final assault began on April 6 the 94th Corps had two divisions in the first echelon and one in the second, plus considerable reinforcements. By the end of the day 39th Army advanced up to 4 km, despite counterattacks by 5th Panzer Division from the west. During the next day the Army was counterattacked 18 times, slowing its advance. By the end of April 9 the German garrison capitulated, while 39th Army was regrouping for subsequent operations into the western part of the Samland Peninsula.

== Manchurian Operation and Postwar ==
39th Army was chosen for the invasion of Japanese-held Manchuria in large part due to its experience in East Prussia; the Japanese frontier was known to be heavily fortified. It entered the Reserve of the Supreme High Command on April 30 and soon began shipping eastwards; by July 1 it was in the Transbaikal Front. In common with many of the rifle divisions employed in this operation the 221st had a battalion of self-propelled artillery (12 SU-76s, one T-70 command tank) added to its order of battle due to the mountainous and near-roadless terrain.

In the plan for the offensive, the 39th was on the Front's left flank, and was facing the Greater Khingan mountains. The operation began on August 9 and the 94th Corps advanced toward Hailar from the south. The neighboring 36th Army soon scored a significant success against the Japanese forces at Hailar, prompting General Lyudnikov to redirect the 358th and 221st Divisions southward to link up with the 124th Division which was engaged with the Japanese forces defending the Halung-Arshaan fortified area. En route, late on August 10, the 221st received the surrender of General Houlin, commander of the Manchurian 10th Military District, plus 1,000 of his men south of Hailar; it then marched eastward toward the mountain pass at Tarchu. After completing the crossing it turned south and engaged elements of the 107th Infantry Division north of Wangyemiao. The main forces of 39th Army began moving by rail to the Liaodong Peninsula on August 17 while 94th Corps remained engaged in the reduction of the last enemy positions in the Wangyemiao area. The main offensive ended with the Japanese capitulation on August 20, but remnants of the 107th continued to resist until near the end of the month. The division commander, along with his remaining 7,858 men, finally capitulated to the 221st on August 30 at Chalai, southwest of Qiqihar. On September 20 the division would be awarded its second battle honor, "Khingan", for its part in this offensive.

At about this time the division was transferred with 94th Corps to 53rd Army, still in Transbaikal Front. It ended the war with the complete title of 221st Rifle, Mariupol-Khingan, Order of the Red Banner, Order of Suvorov Division (Russian: 221-я стрелковая Мариупольско-Хинганская Краснознамённая ордена Суворова дивизия). It was disbanded in October–November at Kharanor station along with its Corps and the 53rd Army. General Kushnarenko went on to command the 94th Rifle Division before moving to the Inspectorate of Rifle Troops from 1947 to 1952. He retired in 1956 and died in Michurinsk in 1964.

== Distinguished fighter ==
Starshina Semyon Danilovich Nomokonov was a sniper who served in the 163rd Rifle Division until the end of 1943 and thereafter in the 2nd Battalion of 695th Rifle Regiment. Born in 1900, he was an ethnic Hamnigan and began using a rifle at the age of seven. During the course of the war he was credited with 367 kills, using an un-scoped Mosin-Nagant M91/30 and received the nickname "Taiga Shaman" from the German and Finnish soldiers he faced. He was wounded eight times and twice injured by nearby shell explosions. He was awarded the Order of Lenin, among other decorations. He returned home after the war and died in June 1973.
