= Ilya Smirnov =

Soviet general

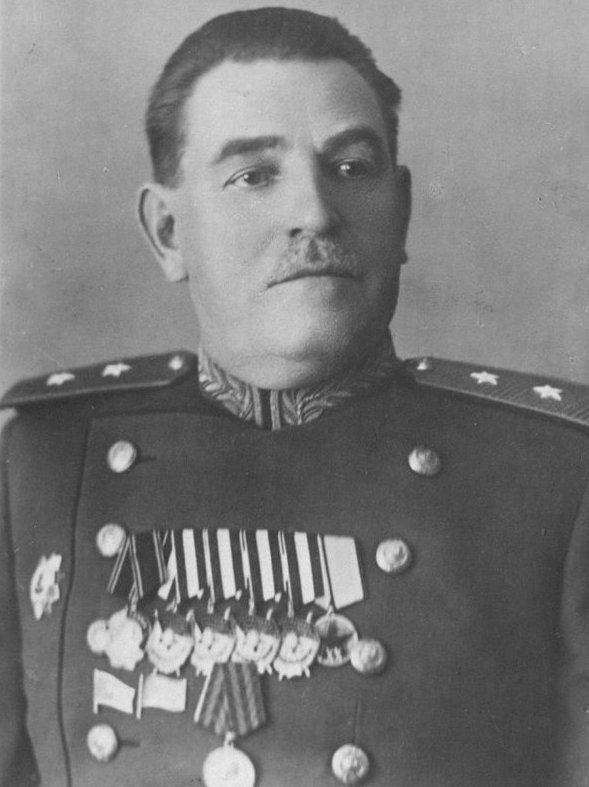
- Born: 30 July 1887; Bolshoye Otryakovo (now Parfenyevsky District), Kologrivsky Uyezd, Kostroma Governorate, Russian Empire
- Died: 28 June 1964 (aged 76) Moscow, Soviet Union
- Allegiance: Russian Empire; Soviet Union
- Branch: Imperial Russian Army; Soviet Red Army
- Service years: 1908–1917 (Russian Empire); 1918–1953 (Soviet Union)
- Rank: lieutenant general
- Commands: 18th Army; 24th Army; 4th Guards Army; Lvov Military District
- Conflicts: World War I Russian Civil War; World War II

Ilya Kornilovich Smirnov (Russian: Илья́ Корни́лович Смирно́в; 30 July 1887 – 28 June 1964) was a Soviet army general. He fought in the Imperial Russian Army during World War I before going over to the Bolsheviks during the subsequent Civil War. He was a recipient of the Order of Lenin, the Order of the Red Banner and the Order of Kutuzov. He retired in 1953 at the age of 66.

Military offices
| Preceded by Fyodor Kamkov | Commander of the 18th Army; February–April 1942 | Succeeded by Fyodor Kamkov |
| Preceded by Iakov Broud | Commander of the 24th Army; May 12 – July 15, 1942 | Succeeded by Vladimir Martsinkevich |
| Preceded by Alexander Ryzhov | Commander of the 4th Guards Army; February 3–22, 1944 | Succeeded by Ivan Galanin |
