= 24th Army (Soviet Union) =

- 24-я армия
- Active: 1 July 1941 – 13 April 1943
- Country: Soviet Union
- Branch: Red Army
- Type: Combined arms
- Size: Field Army
- Part of: I Formation; Siberian Military District; Reserve Front; Western Front; II Formation; Moscow Military District; Moscow Defense Zone; III Formation; Southern Front; North Caucasus Front; Transcaucasian Front; IV Formation; Stalingrad Front; Don Front; Steppe Military District
- Engagements: Yelnya Offensive; Vyazma Defensive Operation; Battle of Stalingrad

Commanders
- Notable commanders: See List

The 24th Army (Russian: 24-я армия) was a field army of the Soviet Union's Red Army, formed in 1941 and active during the Second World War. The army was disbanded and reformed a number of times during the war.

== First Formation ==
The army headquarters, formed from Headquarters Siberian Military District; under General Staff instructions of 25 June 1941 arrived on 28 June 1941 at Vyazma, accepting on arrival in this area six Siberian rifle divisions of the high command reserve (RVGK). Involved in the Yelnya Offensive, August–September 1941. Headquarters disbanded 10 October 1941, having been destroyed in the Vyazma Pocket.

Composition on 1 September 1941:

19th Rifle Division
100th Rifle Division
106th Motorized Division
107th Rifle Division
120th Rifle Division
303rd Rifle Division
309th Rifle Division
6th Moscow People's Militia Division
275th Corps Artillery Regiment
488th Corps Artillery Regiment
685th Corps Artillery Regiment
305th Gun Artillery Regiment
573rd Gun Artillery Regiment
105th Howitzer Artillery Regiment (RVGK)
544th Howitzer Artillery Regiment (RVGK)
533rd Antitank Artillery Regiment
879th Antitank Artillery Regiment
880th Antitank Artillery Regiment
24th Mortar Battalion
102nd Tank Division
105th Tank Division
103rd Motorized Division
37th Engineer Battalion
88th Engineer Battalion
103rd Motorized Engineer Battalion
56th Motorized Pontoon-Bridge Battalion
38th Mixed Aviation Division
10th Fighter Aviation Regiment
163rd Fighter Aviation Regiment
50th Bomber Aviation Regiment
77th Assault Aviation Regiment

Composition on 1 October 1941:

19th Rifle Division
103rd Rifle Division
106th Rifle Division
139th Rifle Division (II)
170th Rifle Division
309th Rifle Division
275th Corps Artillery Regiment
305th Gun Artillery Regiment
573rd Gun Artillery Regiment
103rd Howitzer Artillery Regiment (RVGK)
105th Howitzer Artillery Regiment (RVGK)
544th Howitzer Artillery Regiment (RVGK)
879th Antitank Artillery Regiment
880th Antitank Artillery Regiment
42nd Artillery Battalion
24th Mortar Battalion
144th Tank Brigade
146th Tank Brigade
37th Engineer Battalion
88th Engineer Battalion
103rd Motorized Engineer Battalion
56th Motorized Pontoon-Bridge Battalion
38th Mixed Aviation Division
10th Fighter Aviation Regiment
66th Assault Aviation Regiment

== Second Formation ==
Reformed from 9 December 1941 to 4 January 1942 when it was redesignated as 1st Reserve Army (II). The army was assigned the 385th Rifle Division for less than a month. The army remained in the Moscow Defense Zone through April 1942 with no assigned forces.

== Third Formation ==
Reformed again on 20 May 1942, from an Operational Group under the command of Major General Aleksei Grechkin while assigned to the Southern Front. The army was concentrated in the area of Salsk, Rostov Oblast. The army was then transferred to the North Caucasus Front on 28 July. In early August the units assigned were transferred to the 12th and 37th Armies, and its headquarters relocated to Grozny, Chechen Republic, Soviet Union, where it was assigned to the Transcaucasian Front. The army was disbanded on 23 August and the headquarters personnel were used to form the 58th Army (II) on August 28, 1942;

Composition on 1 June 1942:

73rd Rifle Division
140th Rifle Division
228th Rifle Division
255th Rifle Division
1660th Sapper Battalion
1663rd Sapper Battalion

On 1 August only the Sapper Battalions remained assigned to the Army.

== Fourth Formation ==
Soon afterwards reformed again as part of the Stalingrad front from 9th Reserve Army on 1 September 1942. The army participated in the Battle of Stalingrad as part of both the Stalingrad and Don Fronts. In March–April 1943 relocated to the Voronezh area and was assigned to the Steppe Military District as part of the STAVKA reserves for rebuilding. Was redesignated 4th Guards Army in May 1943.

Composition as of 1 September 1942:

173rd Rifle Division
207th Rifle Division
221st Rifle Division
292nd Rifle Division
308th Rifle Division
1166th Gun Artillery Regiment
383rd Tank Destroyer Regiment
136th Mortar Regiment
247th Antiaircraft Artillery Regiment
278th Antiaircraft Artillery Regiment
217th Tank Brigade

Composition 1 May 1943:

20th Guards Rifle Corps

5th Guards Airborne Division
7th Guards Airborne Division
8th Guards Airborne Division

21st Guards Rifle Corps

68th Guards Rifle Division
69th Guards Rifle Division
84th Rifle Division

214th Rifle Division
233rd Rifle Division
252nd Rifle Division
452nd Tank Destroyer Regiment
1317th Tank Destroyer Regiment
466th Mortar Regiment
27th Antiaircraft Division

1354th Antiaircraft Artillery Regiment
1358th Antiaircraft Artillery Regiment
1364th Antiaircraft Artillery Regiment
1370th Antiaircraft Artillery Regiment

48th Engineer Battalion

== Commanders ==
- Lieutenant General Stepan Kalinin - (26 June – 15 July, 1941)
- Major General Konstantin Rakutin (NKVD) - (15 July – 7 October, 1941)(KIA)
- Major General Mikhail Ivanov - (10 December 1941 – 17 March 1942)
- Major General of Artillery Iakov Broud - (17 March – 1 May, 1942)
- Lieutenant General Ilia Smirnov - (12 May – 15 July, 1942)
- Major General Vladimir Marcinkiewicz (ru) - (15 July – 6 August, 1942)
- Major General Vasily Khomenko (NKVD) - (7–23 August 1942)
- Major General Dmitry Timofeyevich Kozlov - (August–October 1942)
- Major General (Lieutenant General January 1943) Ivan Galanin (October 1942 – April 1943)
- Lieutenant General Alexander Gorbatov - (April 1943)
- Major General German Tarasov
- Lieutenant General Grigory Kulik (April 1943)

== See also ==
- List of Soviet armies

== Sources ==
- List No. 2, Appendix No. 3 to General Staff Directive No D-043of 1970.
- Marchand, Jean-Luc. Order of Battle Soviet Army World War 2. The Nafziger Collection, 24 Volumes
