= 84th Rifle Division =

84th Rifle Division 84th Motorized Division (1940–1941)
- Active: 1923–1945
- Country: Soviet Union
- Branch: Red Army
- Type: Infantry, Motorized Infantry
- Engagements: Winter War; Eastern Front of World War II
- Decorations: Order of the Red Banner
- Honorifics: Tula Proletariat; Kharkov

Commanders
- Notable commanders: Stepan Kalinin

The 84th Rifle Division (Russian: 84-я стрелковая дивизия) was an infantry division of the Red Army before and during World War II.

== History ==
=== Prewar ===
The 84th Rifle Division was formed in 1923 at Tula as one of several Red Army territorial divisions, assigned to the Moscow Military District. Russian Civil War veterans from the 36th Rifle Division and the 12th Red Banner Turkestan Rifle Regiment were used to form the permanent cadre of the division together with volunteer command personnel. After the cadre arrived, they began preparing for the first territorial training camp, which involved the practice mobilization of local men aged 21 to 25. The camp was held between 4 and 19 December; a veteran of the division recalled the "endless discontent and indignation" of the territorials at finding themselves in "uninsulated, unlit barracks lacking furnishings and bedding." The training camp included marching and mock attacks, and was visited by commander-in-chief of the armed forces Sergey Kamenev.

The division was assigned to the 2nd Rifle Corps of the Moscow Military District in October 1924.

=== World War II ===
In July 1940, the division was reorganized into the 84th Motorized Division of the 3rd Mechanized Corps, stationed in the Baltic Special Military District. Major General Pyotr Fomenko, a cavalry officer, became the commander of the division when it was reorganized. After the beginning of Operation Barbarossa, the German invasion of the Soviet Union, the division and its corps fought in the border battles as part of the Northwestern Front. During the Battle of Raseiniai between 23 and 25 June, the division and its corps suffered significant losses, losing almost all of their equipment. Subsequently, the encircled remnants of the corps conducted a fighting retreat through Lithuania and Belarus. After heavy and bloody battles on the Nemunas river, the 84th Motorized Division suffered heavy losses and was reorganized into the 84th Rifle Division in mid-July.

In August, the 84th was withdrawn for reorganization in Valday. From September, the division, assigned to the 11th and then the 34th Army of the Northwestern Front, defended Valday, then fought in the Demyansk Offensive. In late August 1942, the division was sent to the Stalingrad Front. As part of the 4th Tank Army and then the 66th Army from October, it fought in continuous defensive battles, preventing Axis forces from breaking through to Stalingrad. From November, as part of the 24th Army of the Don Front, the division fought in the encirclement and destruction of the German troops in Stalingrad in Operation Koltso.

In April 1943, after the end of the latter, the division was relocated to the area of Voronezh for rebuilding. In the same month Fomenko was promoted to corps command, being replaced by Colonel Pavel Bunyashin, who was promoted to major general on 1 September; Bunyashin commanded the division for the rest of the war. As part of the 53rd and 5th Guards Armies of the Steppe Front (the 2nd Ukrainian from October 1943), the division fought in the Battle of Kursk, the Battle of the Dnieper, the Kirovograd Offensive, the Korsun–Shevchenkovsky Offensive, and the Second Jassy–Kishinev Offensive. The division received the name of Kharkov as an honorific on 23 August 1943 for its actions in the capture of that city and the Order of the Red Banner a month later. In late 1944, the division as part of the 20th Guards Rifle Corps of the 4th Guards Army was withdrawn to the Reserve of the Supreme High Command, and in November joined the 3rd Ukrainian Front to participate in the Budapest Offensive. In the last weeks of the war the division fought in the Vienna Offensive.

Postwar, the division was disbanded in August 1945 and its troops used to reinforce the 21st and 93rd Rifle Divisions of the 57th Army.
