= Yelnya offensive =

Part of Battle of Smolensk (1941)

- Part of World War II, Battle of Smolensk
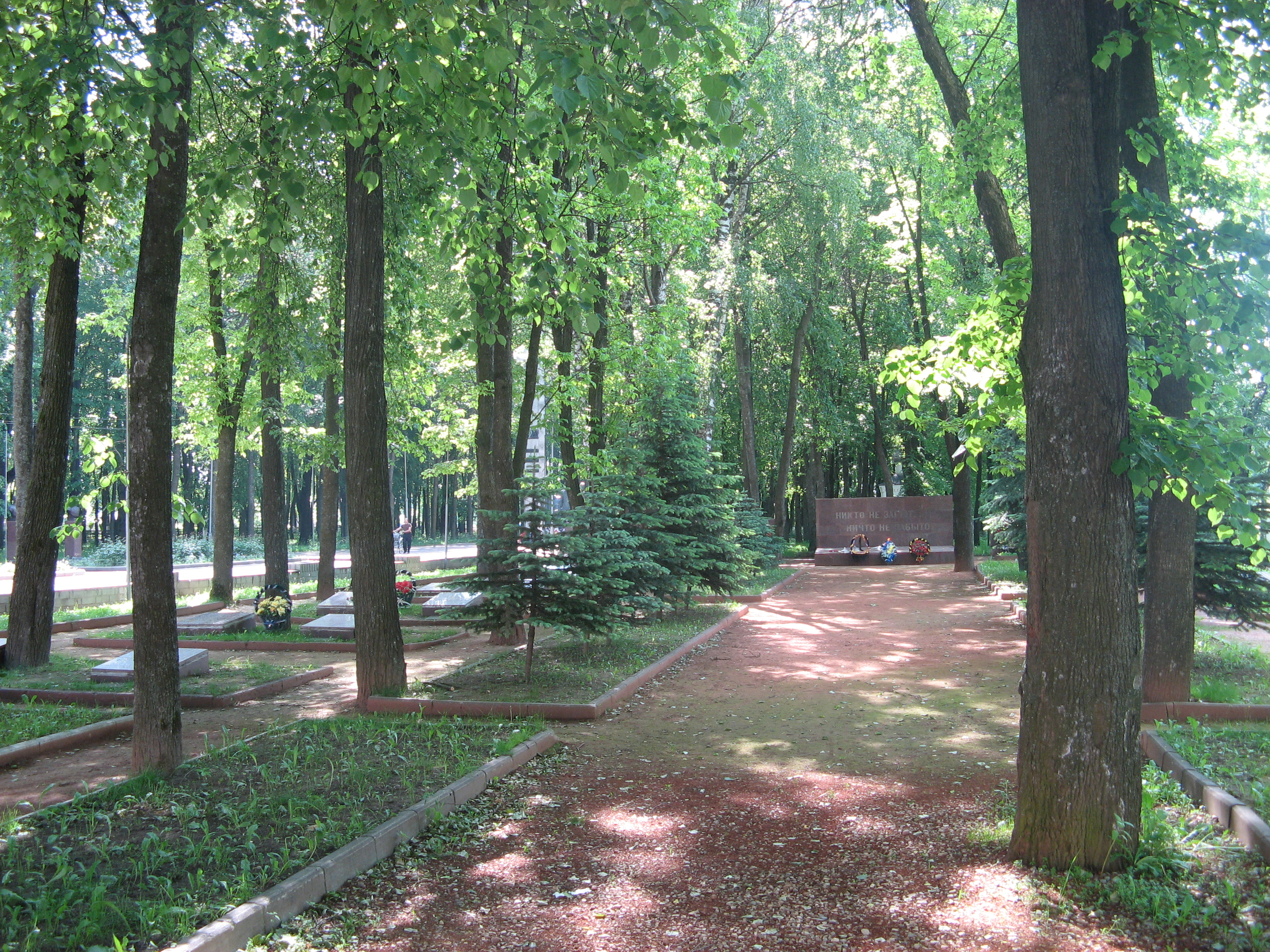
- Mass grave of Red Army soldiers buried in Yelnya
Date	August 30 – September 8, 1941
Location	Yelnya, Soviet Union 54°34′N 33°10′E
Result	Soviet victory

Belligerents
Germany	Soviet Union

Commanders and leaders
Fedor von Bock	Georgy Zhukov; Konstantin Rakutin

Strength
	103,200

Casualties and losses
23,000 (XX Army Corps for the period from August 8 to Sept 8)	10,701 killed or missing 21,152 wounded 31,853 overall

The Yelnya offensive (August 30 – September 8, 1941) was a military operation by the Soviet Army during the Battle of Smolensk during Operation Barbarossa, the German invasion of the Soviet Union, which began the German-Soviet War. The offensive was an attack against the semi-circular Yelnya salient which the German 4th Army had extended 50 kilometres (31 mi) south-east of Smolensk, forming a staging area for an offensive towards Vyazma and eventually Moscow. Under heavy pressure on its flanks, the German army (Heer) evacuated the salient by 8 September 1941, leaving behind a devastated and depopulated region. As the first reverse that the Heer suffered during Barbarossa and the first recapture of Soviet territory by the Red Army, the battle was covered by Nazi and Soviet propaganda and served as a morale boost to the Soviet population.

== Background ==
The town of Yelnya was located 82 km south-east of Smolensk situated near heights deemed strategic by General Heinz Guderian, commander of the 2nd Panzer Group, as the springboard for further offensive operations towards Moscow. The 2nd Panzer Group took the heights on 19 July 1941, but ran out of fuel and almost ran out of ammunition. The extended flanks of the bridgehead were subject to frequent counter-attacks of the Red Army while the Army Group Center paused operations in late July to rest and refit.

On 1 August, Stavka (Soviet High Command) authorised formation of the Reserve Front, led by Marshal Georgy Zhukov, with several new armies under his command. These formations were generally poorly trained and had few tanks and artillery pieces. Two of the new armies—the 24th Army under the command of Major General Konstantin Rakutin and the 43rd Army under Lieutenant General Pavel Kurochkin—were to support the Western Front under the command of Semyon Timoshenko. The two formations were to destroy the German forces at Yelnya and advance across the Desna River to retake Roslavl, which had been lost to the 2nd Panzer Group in early August.

The German forces initially located in the salient were the 10th Panzer Division, Waffen-SS Division Das Reich, and 268th Infantry Division, among others. These divisions were replaced by the 137th, 78th and 292nd infantry divisions in addition to the 268th, about 70,000 troops in all with some 500 artillery pieces and 40 StuG IIIs of the 202nd Assault Gun Battalion, the last three a part of the German XX Army Corps. The northern base of the salient was held by the 15th Infantry Division, while the southern base was held by the 7th Infantry Division.

== Battle ==
The first phase of the operation began at the end of the first week in August; the initial attack was a failure and was called off within 48 hours. Nevertheless, the Soviet offensive operations continued up till 20 August and then resumed on August 30, in concert with operations by the Western Front and the Bryansk Front under General Andrey Yeryomenko.

Troops of the Soviet 24th and 43rd armies moving through Yelnya, 6 September 1941

The intent of the 30 August offensive was to assault the bases of the salient, with the 102nd Tank Division and the 303rd Rifle Division forming the outer front of the encirclement, while the 107th, and 100th Rifle Divisions of the northern pincer and 106th Motorized Division of the southern pincer formed the inner front of the encirclement. Supporting the 106th in the south was the 303rd Rifle Division. Containing the salient in the central (eastern) sector of the offensive were the 19th Rifle Division and 309th Rifle Division. The 103rd Motorized Division and 120th Rifle Division were deployed on the northern and southern sides of the salient in fortified field positions to cut routes of escape by the German divisions. The 24th Army was allocated only 20 aircraft for reconnaissance and correction of artillery fire for the operation, with no fighter or strike support.

On September 3, under the threat of an encirclement, the German forces started retreating from the salient while maintaining resistance on the flanks. After a week of heavy combat, Hitler permitted Army Group Center's commander Fedor von Bock to evacuate the Yelnya bridgehead; on September 6 Yelnya was retaken by the Red Army. The Soviet offensive continued through September 8, when it was halted at the new German defense line. Although Soviet sources claimed that the German forces were destroyed in the salient, most of them were able to retreat. Nonetheless, the fighting in August and September had caused the XX Army Corps 23,000 casualties and the 4th Army was not able to recover from them for the rest of the year.

== Aftermath ==
The families of collective farmers of the Zarya kolkhoz (village of Klimyatino, Yelninsky District) Konstantin Ivchenko and Aleksey Amelchenko after returning to their village, burned by German troops, September 1941

British war correspondent Alexander Werth described his visit to the Yelnya area in the aftermath of its recapture in his 1964 book Russia at War 1941–1945. The town of the 15,000 inhabitants had been completely destroyed, and nearly all able bodied men and women had been formed into forced labor battalions and driven to the German rear. Only a few hundred old people and children were allowed to stay in the town. The witnesses described to Werth how, on the night before the Wehrmacht pulled out of the town, they had been locked into the church and observed German soldiers looting houses and systematically setting each on fire. They were freed by the advancing Red Army. Werth described the countryside of the "Yelnya salient" (territory that had been held by the Wehrmacht) as "completely devastated", with "every village and every town destroyed, and the few surviving civilians living in cellars and dugouts".

The Wehrmacht losses included 23,000 casualties of the XX Army Corps for the period from 8 August to 8 September. The Red Army losses for the period from 30 August to 8 September are estimated at 31,853 overall casualties. Historian David Glantz states that although the offensive succeeded in attaining its strategic objective, the operation cost the 24th Army nearly 40 percent of its operational strength. This, combined with other failed Red Army offensives in the Smolensk area, temporarily blunted the German drive but seriously weakened Red Army formations defending the approaches to Moscow. In a lecture to the US Army Heritage and Education Center, Glantz asserted that in the run up to the Battle of Moscow, the Wehrmacht would not have made nearly as much progress as they did if the Stavka had not suffered losses in unsuccessful counter-offensives east of Smolensk. At the same time, in the 2015 edition of When Titans Clashed: How the Red Army Stopped Hitler (co-written by Glantz and Jonathan House), the authors state that while "Western Front's losses undermined its ability to contain a future German offensive (...), the damage it did to Bock's army group [contributed to the later] German collapse at the gates of Moscow".

== In German and Soviet propaganda ==
The Yelnya offensive was the first substantial reverse that the Wehrmacht had suffered during Barbarossa. Nazi propaganda presented the retreat as a planned operation; in September 1941, a German infantryman wrote:

Officially it was called a "planned withdrawal" (...). But to me it was so much bullshit. The next day, we heard on the radio, in the 'news from the front' [the Wehrmachtbericht] about the "successful front correction" in our Yelnya defensive lines and the enormous losses we inflicted on the enemy. But no single word was heard about a retreat, about the hopelessness of the situation, about the mental and emotional numbness of the German soldiers. In short, it was again a "victory". But we on the front line were running back like rabbits in front of the fox. This metamorphosis of the truth from "all shit" to "it was a victory" baffled me, and those of my comrades who dared to think.

For its part, Soviet propaganda hailed the offensive as a major success and wanted to draw worldwide attention to it. Thus, the Yelnya battle was the first occasion on which foreign correspondents in the Soviet Union were allowed to visit the front. Seven of eight of them visited the area between 15 and 22 September 1941. In the words of Werth, the battle was built up in the Soviet Press "out of all proportion to its real or ultimate importance". He nonetheless highlights the operation's impact on the Soviet morale, noting (emphasis in the original):

Here was not only, as it were, the first victory of the Red Army over the Germans; here was also the first piece of territory —perhaps only 100 to 150 square miles [260 to 390 km^{2}]— in the whole of Europe reconquered from Hitler's Wehrmacht. It is strange to think that in 1941 even that was considered an achievement.

== Creation of the Guards ==
The Yelnya offensive is associated with the creation of the elite Guards units in the Red Army when the 100th Rifle Division and 127th Rifle Division were renamed into 1st Guards Rifle Division and 2nd Guards Rifle Division. On 26 September 1941 the 107th Rifle Division and 120th Rifle Division were also renamed the 5th Guards Rifle Division and 6th Guards Rifle Division.
