= 105th Tank Division (Soviet Union) =

- 105-я танковая дивизия
- Active: 15th July 1941 - 13th September 1941
- Disbanded: 13th September 1941
- Country: Soviet Union
- Branch: Army
- Engagements: Battle of Smolensk

Commanders
- Commander: Beloglazov Aleksey Stepanovich

The 105th Tank Division was an armored formation of the Red Army that served during the World War II. It was active from 15 July 1941 to 13 September 1941.

== History ==
The 105th Tank Division was formed in July 1941 from the 53rd Tank Division of the 27th Mechanized Corps. The division was commanded by Colonel Aleksei Stepanovich Beloglazov.

Beginning on 15 July 1941, the division fought on the eastern front. During the Battle of Smolensk, it operated alongside the 104th Tank Division in an attempt to save the encircled 16th, 19th, and 20th armies near Smolensk.

On 19 July 1941, German armored units broke through the defenses of the 19th Rifle Division and captured Yelnya, an important railway junction on the Smolensk line. This severed the supply route to the partially encircled 16th and 20th Armies.

Following the fighting at Yelnya, the commanders of the 105th Tank Division, 103rd Motorized Rifle Division, and 106th Rifle Division were relieved of command by Georgy Zhukov and reassigned to lower-ranking positions.

== Commanders ==
- Colonel Beloglazov Aleksey Stepanovich (15 07 1941 - 13 09 1941).
