= Reserve Army (Soviet Union) =

Type of formation of the Red Army in WW2

The Reserve Armies were a group of armies formed by the Soviet Union's Red Army during World War II. Formed to control the training of newly formed units in the rear areas and provide army level headquarters to reconstitute destroyed armies or to form new armies. The Reserve Armies provided the Soviet High Command with a quickly deployable army headquarters to help stem German breakthroughs in the early part of the war.

== 1st Reserve Army ==
- Former 24th Army January 1942.
- First Formation redesignated 64th Army July 1942.
- Second Formation redesignated 2nd Guards Army December 1942.

== 2nd Reserve Army ==
- First Formation redesignated 1st Guards Army (First Formation) 7 August 1942.
- Second Formation redesignated 63rd Army (Second Formation) April 1943.

== 3rd Reserve Army ==
- First Formation redesignated 60th Army July 1942.
- Second Formation redesignated 2nd Tank Army January 1943.
- Third Formation redesignated 21st Army July 1943.

== 4th Reserve Army ==
- Redesignated 1st Guards Army (Second Formation) 8 December 1942.

== 5th Reserve Army ==
- Redesignated 63rd Army July 1942.

== 6th Reserve Army ==
- Redesignated 6th Army (Third Formation) July 1942.

== 7th Reserve Army ==
- Formed on 28 May 1942 in the STAVKA Reserves.
- Redesignated 62nd Army July 1942.

== 8th Reserve Army ==
- Redesignated 66th Army August 1942.

== 9th Reserve Army ==
- Redesignated 24th Army (Fourth Formation) September 1942.

== 10th Reserve Army ==
- Redesignated 5th Shock Army December 1942.

== Reserve Army Southern Front ==
- Active in from 5 August 1941 to 25 August 1941.
- Redesignated 6th Army (Second Formation) 25 August 1941.

== Reserve Army, Black Sea Group of Forces ==
- Active from 10 January 1943 to 13 February 1943.
- Redesignated 12th Army (Third Formation)
