= Stepan Kalinin =

Soviet military officer

Stepan Andrianovich Kalinin
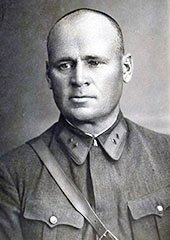
- Born: 28 December 1890; Pankratovskaya, Bogorodsky Uyezd, Moscow Governorate, Russian Empire
- Died: 11 September 1975 (aged 84) Moscow, Soviet Union
- Allegiance: Russian Empire; Soviet Union
- Branch: Imperial Russian Army; Soviet Red Army
- Service years: 1912–1917 (Russian Empire); 1918–1946 (Soviet Union)
- Rank: lieutenant general
- Commands: 24th Army; 66th Army
- Conflicts: World War I Russian Civil War; World War II

Stepan Andrianovich Kalinin (Russian: Степа́н Андриа́нович Кали́нин; 28 December 1890 – 11 September 1975) was a Soviet army commander. He fought in the Imperial Russian Army during World War I before going over to the Bolsheviks during the subsequent civil war. He was promoted to Komkor (corps commander) in 1938.

He was a member of the Communist Party of the Soviet Union. He was a recipient of the Order of Lenin and the Order of the Red Banner.

He was relieved of duty in 1944, then held in prison without being questioned for six years until his case was reopened in 1950. He was sentenced to 25 years but was freed after the death of Joseph Stalin in 1953 and subsequently rehabilitated.

== Early years ==
Kalinin was born on December 15 (27), 1890 in the village of Pankratovskaya, Moscow Governorate to working class parents. From the age of 15 he worked at textile factories in the Bogorodskoye and Yegoryevsky districts of Moscow province.

He joined the Russian Imperial Army in November 1912. He graduated from the training team of the 12th Grenadier Astrakhan Regiment (Moscow) of the 3rd Grenadier Division (Moscow Military District) in 1913, then served in this regiment as a corporal.

With the outbreak of the First World War, he was transferred to the Skopinsky 220th Infantry Regiment of the 55th Infantry Division of the 1st Army of the Northwestern Front. At the end of 1914 he was seriously wounded by an explosive bullet; he returned to the regiment only in the fall of 1915.

In the summer of 1916, on the Western Front, he was seriously wounded for the second time and was also shell-shocked. He was treated in a hospital in Bryansk, at which time he managed to graduate from the Bryansk Men's Gymnasium as an external student. Upon recovery in November 1916, he was enlisted in the 11th Infantry Reserve Regiment in Bryansk. In January 1917 he returned to the 220th Infantry Regiment.

After the February Revolution he was elected a member of the regimental soldiers' committee in March 1917. Along with other soldier delegates from the division in April 1917, he came to Petrograd to meet with Nikolay Chkheidze, Matvey Skobelev, Alexander Kerensky, Nikolai Krylenko, and Vladimir Lenin.

== Revolution and Civil War ==
In May, he was sent to study military science in Pskov. There in Pskov, in 1917, he joined the RSDLP(b), and was a deputy of the Pskov City Council. He graduated from school in September, was promoted to the rank of ensign, and was sent as acting company commander to the 12th reserve regiment (Karachev, Oryol province). After the October Revolution, he was appointed commandant of the city and commander of the Karachevsky Military Revolutionary Detachment.

From January 1918 he was chief of staff of the Northern Military Revolutionary Detachments in Bryansk. From March 1918, with a detachment of revolutionary soldiers, he was in Samara, subordinate to Valerian Kuybyshev, organizing the dispatch of trains with food from the Volga region to Petrograd. After the uprising of the Czechoslovak Legion in May-June 1918, he participated in the defense of Samara from the Czechs as the commander of an artillery battery. When leaving Samara he fell ill with typhus.

He returned to active duty in October 1918 and participated in the Russian Civil War. First, he was appointed military commissar of the Main Staff (Directorate) of the Food Requisition Army of the People's Commissariat of Food of the RSFSR. In August 1919, he was appointed commander of the 19th brigade of Cheka troops in Penza, and in November the head of the Saratov sector of Cheka troops. He took part in the fight against banditry in the Penza and Tambov provinces, in the fighting at Bugulma in 1920 and the uprising of Alexander Sapozhkov. In September 1920 he was named commander of the VNUS troops of the Trans-Volga Military District. After the VNUS troops joined the Red Army in November 1920, he was appointed assistant commander of the Trans-Volga Military District (renamed the Volga Military District in September 1921).

== Career between the Wars ==
In 1922 he graduated from the Higher Academic Courses at the Military Academy of the Red Army. In September he was appointed commander of the 33rd Infantry Division of the Volga Military District (Samara), but was removed from office for exceeding official authority (“squandering public funds” for holding several banquets in his division) in December. He was conditionally sentenced to three years in prison for this offense in 1923. He held a variety of commands over the next fifteen years.

He was elected deputy of the Supreme Soviet of the Ukrainian SSR at its 1938 Congress. On March 16, 1941, he was re-elected as a deputy of the Supreme Soviet of the USSR from Leninsk-Kuznetsk.

== Service during World War II ==
At the beginning of World War II he was appointed commander of the 24th Army, which was formed from district troops on June 28, 1941. In early July, the army began moving in echelons to the front, where it formed the reserve of the Headquarters of the Main Command of the Red Army, and on July 14 it was included in the Front of the Reserve Armies. The following day July 15, Kalinin was replaced as army commander by Major General Konstantin Rakutin; in his memoirs, Kalinin hints at the role of Lavrentiy Beria in this decision.

Beginning on 22 July 1941, Kalinin commanded an operational group of troops in the area northeast of Smolensk (“General Rakutin’s group”) consisting of two rifle divisions. He participated in the Battle of Smolensk, in which his task force, together with similar groups of generals Ivan Maslennikov, Vasily Khomenko, Konstantin Rokossovsky and Vladimir Kachalov, launched a concentric attack on Smolensk, in order to release the troops fighting in the city area 16th and 20th armies and liberate Smolensk. But due to the weakness of the groups, lack of time for preparation, the timing of the attacks and the dominance of German aviation in the air, this strike did not reach its target.

On August 3, 1941, he was appointed chief of reserve units and assistant commander of the Western Front. Author of a report prepared at that time by order of the Military Council of the Western Front on shortcomings in the actions of Soviet troops in the first months of the war. At the beginning of the German general offensive on Moscow (October 1941), he was caught in the disposition of troops and independently led several divisions that were out of contact with the headquarters of the army and front, and managed to organize their breakthrough to his own, albeit with significant losses. In mid-October, he was recalled to the command of the People's Commissar of Defense of the USSR and was urgently sent to Novosibirsk with the task of sending several Siberian divisions to Moscow as soon as possible.

From 1 December 1941, he was commander of the Volga Military District, responsible for forming and training new units and formations for the front, as well as establishing the effective operation of numerous military educational institutions in the district. In June and July of 1942, he formed the 8th Reserve Army in the district, on August 15, 1942 he was appointed commander of the 66th Army created on its basis and sent with it to the Stalingrad Front.

When he arrived there, however, the order appointing Kalinin as army commander was canceled at the request of Efim Shchadenko, the Deputy People's Commissar of Defense of the USSR and Head of the Main Directorate of Formation and Manning of the Red Army. On August 27, Kalinin surrendered the army to the new army commander, General Rodion Malinovsky, and returned to command of the Volga Military District.

== Repression and rehabilitation ==
On May 18, 1944, while Kalinin was serving as Commander of the Kharkov Military District, riots broke out at the Krasnoarmeyskaya station, leading to several deaths, robberies, and beatings of officers. Kalinin was charged with dereliction of duty and was removed from his post of Commander of the Kharkov Military District.

Kalinin was arrested on June 13, 1944. The NKVD's dossier concerning him noted:

“In conversations with his colleagues and in public speeches, he declared the unprofitability and low productivity of labor on collective farms, took repressed kulaks under his protection, and expressed dissatisfaction with the punitive policies of the Soviet government. During the Patriotic War, he expressed doubts about the correctness of the war, accusing the Supreme High Command of the Red Army of not caring about preserving human reserves and allowing large losses in certain operations”.

The investigation added other charges of “anti-Soviet propaganda” based on his conversations with other prisoners in his prison cell, as well as his close connection with Ivan Semenovich Kutyakov (ru), an “enemy of the people” who had been executed in 1937 and with whom Kalinin “had criminal conversations” since 1932. During a search of Kalinin's apartment, his diaries with sharply critical reviews of the Soviet leadership were discovered. During a search of Kalinin's apartment, his diaries with sharply critical reviews of the Soviet leadership were discovered.

In December 1946, he was discharged from the Armed Forces. Kalinin was kept in prison in Moscow, but was not interrogated from 1945 to 1950.

When interrogation resumed in 1950 the original charges were enhanced. On October 25, 1951, seven years after his arrest, Kalinin was found guilty under Article 58-10, part 2 and under Article 193-17, paragraph “a” of the Criminal Code of the RSFSR by the Military Collegium of the Supreme Court of the USSR and sentenced to imprisonment for a term of 25 years, with confiscation of property, as well as deprivation of state awards and loss of political rights for five years. He was deprived of the military rank of “lieutenant General” by the Decree of the Council of Ministers of the USSR of January 10, 1952.

The term of his sentence commenced retroactively, beginning on June 14, 1944. Kalinin was sent to the “AG” forced labor camp of the USSR Ministry of Internal Affairs in the city of Mariinsk, Kemerovo oblast to serve his sentence. While serving his sentence, the camp court convicted him again on March 11, 1953 under Article 58-10, Part 1 of the Criminal Code of the RSFSR for the crime of carrying out anti-Soviet agitation among prisoners and slandering the leaders of the Soviet government and the Communist Party. He was sentenced to another ten years in prison loss of political rights for another five years.

Kalinin's original sentence of October 25, 1951 was overturned shortly after the death of Joseph Stalin by the Military Collegium of the Supreme Court of the USSR on July 28, 1953, which reduced his sentence of 25 years to time served, without loss of rights. Kalinin was not released, however, until his second 1953 conviction was overturned. Kalinin was finally released on November 17, 1953. Kalinin was reinstated in the Soviet Army, restored to his previous military rank, and immediately transferred to the reserve due to age with the pension due to generals, in January 1954. Kalinin was completely rehabilitated on November 2, 1956, when, by a resolution of the plenum of the Supreme Court of the USSR, all court decisions against him were voided and his case was dismissed due to the lack of evidence to support the charges against him.

Kalinin lived the remainder of his life in Moscow. He wrote his memoirs, but, because of censorship, did not mention his arrest and imprisonment. He died on September 11, 1975 in Moscow and was buried in the Khimki cemetery.

Preceded by New office	Commander of the 24th Army; June–July 1941	Succeeded by Konstantin Rakutin
Preceded by Vladimir Kurdyumov	Commander of the 66th Army; 15–27 August 1942	Succeeded by Rodion Malinovsky

== Sources and external links ==
- Выступление С. А. Калинина на совещании высшего командного состава Красной Армии в декабре 1940 года
- Статья о С. А. Калинине «Судьба командарма-24»
- Коллектив авторов. «Великая Отечественная. Командармы. Военный биографический словарь» — М.; Жуковский: Кучково поле, 2005. ISBN 5-86090-113-5
- Сборник. Командный и начальствующий состав Красной Армии в 1940—1941 гг. Структура и кадры центрального аппарата НКО СССР, военных округов и общевойсковых армий. Документы и материалы. М.;СПб.:Летний сад, 2005.
- Калинин Степан Андрианович
- Фото http://voenspez.ru/index.php?topic=11202.20

== Sources ==
- Коллектив составителей и редакторов (2006). Военный совет при народном комиссаре обороны СССР. 1938, 1940 гг.: Документы и материалы (1000 экз ed.). М: РОССПЭН. p. 336. ISBN 5-8243-0694-X.
