= 303rd Rifle Division =

303rd Rifle Division (July 10 – December 27, 1941) 303rd Rifle Division (January 1, 1942 – 1946)
- Maj. Gen. K. S. Fyodorovskiy, Hero of the Soviet Union
- Active: 1941–1946
- Country: Soviet Union
- Branch: Red Army
- Type: Infantry
- Size: Division
- Engagements: Operation Barbarossa; Yelnya Offensive; Operation Typhoon; Operation Blue; Battle of Kursk; Battle of the Dniepr; First Jassy–Kishinev Offensive; Second Jassy-Kishinev Offensive; Siege of Budapest; Prague Offensive
- Decorations: Order of the Red Banner
- Battle honours: Upper Dniepr; Beltsy

Commanders
- Notable commanders: Col. Nikolai Pavlovich Rudnev; Col. Alexsandr Gavrilovich Moiseevskiy; Col. Lev Ivanovich Ostroukhov; Maj. Gen. Konstantin Stepanovich Fyodorovskiy; Col. Ivan Dmitrievich Panov

The 303rd Rifle Division began service as a standard Red Army rifle division shortly after the German invasion, and in its first formation fought in the central part of the Soviet-German front for a few months, taking part in the first offensive success of the Red Army at Yelnya, before being encircled and annihilated in the fighting around Vyasma. A second 303rd was raised a few months later and fought on, mainly in the central sector of Ukraine. The men and women of the division first distinguished themselves during the summer offensive of 1943, making an assault crossing of the Dniepr River at Verkhnodniprovsk and gaining a battle honor for it. A second such honor was won in the spring of 1944 for the division's role in the liberation of the city of Beltsy in Moldova. It ended the war at Prague, after advancing through Romania, Hungary and Austria. The division was disbanded in 1946.

== 1st Formation ==
The division began forming on July 10, 1941 at Voronezh in the Oryol Military District. Col. Nikolai Pavlovich Rudnev was appointed as commanding officer on the same day. The division's order of battle was as follows:

- 845th Rifle Regiment
- 847th Rifle Regiment
- 849th Rifle Regiment
- 844th Artillery Regiment
- 561st Sapper Battalion
- 741th Signal Battalion
- 365th Reconnaissance Company

Less than a month after forming, the 303rd was assigned to Reserve Front, moving to 43rd Army of that Front on August 10, just as that Army was itself forming up. By the end of August it had been shifted to 24th Army, and took part in the third counteroffensive against the Yelnya salient, beginning on August 30. The division led the southern Shock Group as part of the planned concentric attack to seal off the salient, and advanced 2km on the first day, and again on the second. After standing off German counterattacks for two days, it again advanced on September 3, with assistance from a tank battalion. It was still about 8km short of linking up with the northern Group when German Army Group Center ordered its forces to withdraw from the salient, which was carried out over the next four days. Army General G.K. Zhukov gave the 303rd little credit for this success, stating that "The 303rd... operated poorly and without initiative". Consequently, it was not chosen to become one of the first four Guards rifle divisions. As of September 12 the rifle regiments of the division averaged only 400 men each, indicating excessive casualties.

By the end of September the division was reassigned yet again, to 49th Army of Reserve Front some 200km to the north in the area of Sychevka. Before this move could get well underway, the 303rd was swept up in the German Operation Typhoon, and by October 10 was deeply encircled north of Spas-Demensk. By the end of the month the division was effectively destroyed as a fighting unit, but a cadre survived, and Col. Alexsandr Gavrilovich Moiseevskiy was appointed to its command on October 31. The division lingered on the official order of battle until December 27.

== 2nd Formation ==
A new rifle division, initially numbered the 448th, began forming on January 1, 1942, at Topki in the Siberian Military District. Its first commander, Col. Lev Ivanovich Ostroukhov, was assigned on that date. It was largely formed from men drafted out of the Kuzbass coal mining region, and in March was re-designated as the second 303rd Rifle Division. At this time its composition by nationality was recorded as 40% Russian and 60% Siberian and others. It remained in the Siberian District until April. Its order of battle remained the same as that of the 1st formation, although an unknown numbered antitank battalion would have also been included.

Late in that month it moved to the Moscow Military District and was assigned to the 2nd Reserve Army in the STAVKA reserves. By July the division was in 3rd Reserve Army when it was re-designated the 60th Army for front-line service. On July 19 that Army went into Voronezh Front, and on that same date, Col. Konstantin Stepanovich Fyodorovskiy was promoted from chief of staff to divisional command. Promoted to the rank of Major General on January 17, 1944, he remained in command until late December of the same year. The 303rd spent the remainder of 1942 in that Army in that Front, mounting an aggressive defense against what the STAVKA anticipated to be a German drive to the northeast towards Moscow. In early 1943 it was moved to 40th Army, and then for a month in Voronezh Front reserves for rebuilding.

Following this the 303rd was transferred to Southwestern Front, and in April to 57th Army of that Front. Following the Battle of Kursk, 57th Army was moved to Steppe Front (soon to be renamed as 2nd Ukrainian Front) and in September the division was reassigned to the 7th Guards Army. The 303rd was destined to remain in that Front for the duration.

== Advance ==
It was in this period, during the Battle of the Dniepr, that the division was recognized for its efforts in a river-crossing operation at the town of Verkhnodniprovsk, and received the following unusual honorific:

"UPPER DNIEPR - Liberated on October 22, 1943 by troops of 2nd Ukrainian Front in the attack on the Krivoy Rog direction during the battle for the Dniepr... 303rd Rifle Division (Col. Fyodorovskiy, Konstantin Stepanovich)... By order of the Supreme High Command is given this name."

The division was further recognized on January 8, 1944, with the award of the Order of the Red Banner. In February it was moved to the 52nd Army as part of the 78th Rifle Corps, in which it liberated the Moldovan town of Beltsy on March 26, and earned its second battle honor:

"BELTSY - 303rd Rifle Division (Maj. Gen. Fyodorovskiy, Konstantin Stepanovich)... The troops who participated in the battles during the crossing of the Dniestr and the liberation of Beltsy... by order of the Supreme High Command and a commendation in Moscow on 26 March 1944 are saluted with 24 salvoes from 324 guns."

However, the Corps' advance ran out of steam the next month outside the Romanian city of Iași.

In June the 303rd was again redeployed, this time to 4th Guards Army. In late August, after the start of the 2nd Jassy-Kishinev Offensive the division was moved to Front reserves for re-building during the swift advance through Romania. Re-building complete, in October it was back in 7th Guards Army, this time for the duration, and now serving in Hungary. For most of that period it was under the 27th Guards Rifle Corps, although in the last two months it also served in both the 24th and 25th Guards Rifle Corps. During the Debrecen operation on October 19 the 303rd was urgently summoned to the Mezőtúr area in response to a surprise German tank attack. Mezőtúr was taken on October 23, and the east bank of the Tisza River was reached on the 25th. On November 1 an assault crossing was forced, and over the next four days, in cooperation with the 227th Rifle Division, the city of Szolnok was captured. For its contribution to the latter feat the 847th Rifle Regiment was awarded the Order of Kutuzov, 3rd Degree. On the afternoon of November 6 the division began an advance in the direction of Kharomkhaz and on the 14th, along with the 227th and 409th Rifle Divisions, penetrated the southern suburbs of Jászberény.

From September 18 to December 5, the 303rd was officially credited with the destruction of up to 1,000 enemy soldiers and officers, 22 tanks, 3 self-propelled guns, 4 armored personnel carriers, 4 other vehicles and 16 machine guns, as well as capturing 75 prisoners-of-war, 20 machine-guns, and other enemy equipment. During the Siege of Budapest in December, the division accounted for up to 200 more enemy troops, 8 mortars, 4 guns and 17 machine-guns destroyed, plus 3 tanks, 3 prime movers, 13 guns, 34 other vehicles, 37 machine-guns, and another 105 prisoners-of-war captured. From September 18 to December 14, soldiers of the division were awarded a total of 1,007 orders and medals, including one Order of Lenin, eight Orders of the Red Banner, 12 Orders of Alexander Nevsky, 166 Orders of the Great Patriotic War, 96 Orders of the Red Star, and 724 medals.

While this offensive continued in Hungary, in the face of bitter enemy resistance, on December 21 the division reached positions from Savditse to Setikh. During this advance Major General Fyodorovskiy was mortally wounded by enemy fire, and died of his wounds a week later. Col. Ivan Dmitrievich Panov replaced him in command on December 24, and led the division for the duration of hostilities. On Victory Day the 303rd was just south of Prague. By this time the men and women of the division had earned the full title of 303rd Rifle, Upper Dniepr, Beltsy, Order of the Red Banner Division. (Russian: 303-я стрелковая Верхнеднепровская Бельцская Краснознамённая дивизия.)

== Postwar ==
The division was initially part of the Central Group of Forces. The division was transferred with the 23rd Rifle Corps to the Stavropol Military District during the summer of 1945. It was based in Nevinnomyssk. The division was disbanded there before the summer of 1946, when the 23rd Rifle Corps became part of the North Caucasus Military District.
