= Iakov Broud =

- Born: 24 March 1900; Russian Empire
- Died: 27 July 1942 (aged 42) Soviet Union
- Allegiance: Soviet Union
- Branch: Soviet Red Army
- Service years: 1919–1942
- Rank: major general
- Commands: 24th Army
- Conflicts: Russian Civil War; World War II; Winter War; Eastern Front †

Iakov Broud (24 March 1900 – 27 July 1942) was a Soviet army commander of Jewish origin. He fought in the wars against the White movement and Finland. He was a recipient of the Order of the Red Banner. He commanded the artillery in the 28th Army and the 64th Army. He was killed in action at Stalingrad in 1942 supervising his troops crossing the Don River.

Military offices
Preceded by Mikhail Ivanov	Commander of the 24th Army; 17 March – 1 May 1942	Succeeded by Ilia Smirnov
