= 309th Rifle Division =

- Active: 1941–1945
- Country: Soviet Union
- Branch: Red Army
- Type: Infantry
- Size: Division
- Engagements: Operation Barbarossa; Yelnya Offensive; Operation Typhoon; Operation Blue; Battle of Kursk; Battle of the Dniepr; Battle of Kiev (1943); Lvov–Sandomierz Offensive; Vistula–Oder Offensive; Siege of Breslau
- Decorations: Order of the Red Banner; Order of Kutuzov 2nd class
- Battle honours: Piryatin

Commanders
- Notable commanders: Col. Nikifor Alekseevich Ilyantzev; Maj. Gen. Aleksandr Nikolaievich Afanasev; Maj. Gen. Mikhail Ivanovich Menshikov; Maj. Gen. Dmitry Feoktisovich Dryomin; Col. Mikhail Vasilevich Yevstigneev; Col. Boris Davidovich Lev

The 309th Rifle Division was formed for the first time as a standard Red Army rifle division shortly after the German invasion. It fought its first battles at the Yelnya Salient, participating in that early Soviet success before being swept up in Operation Typhoon, encircled and destroyed. At the very end of 1941 the division was reformed. It served on mostly inactive sectors during 1942, but in 1943 it played an important role in containing the offensive of 4th Panzer Army at Kursk. It followed this in September with one of the first successful assault crossings of the Dniepr River, for which many men of the 309th were named as Heroes of the Soviet Union. The division continued in combat through Ukraine, Poland and Silesia before ending the war near Breslau.

== 1st Formation ==
The division began forming on July 10, 1941 at Kursk in the Oryol Military District. Col. Nikifor Alekseevich Ilyantzev was assigned to command on that date, and he would be the only commanding officer of the 1st Formation. The division's basic order of battle was as follows:

- 955th Rifle Regiment
- 957th Rifle Regiment
- 959th Rifle Regiment
- 842nd Artillery Regiment

Less than a month after forming, the 309th was assigned to Reserve Front, moving to 24th Army of that Front on August 5, just as that Army was itself forming up. Its first divisional headquarters was established at Gordunovka. By the end of August the fresh division had arrived at the front and took part in the third counteroffensive against the Yelnya Salient, beginning on August 30.

The division was assigned to the central shock group, intended to hold the German forces in the salient while it was pinched off by the northern and southern groups. Attacking alongside the 19th Rifle Division, the 309th made almost no headway on the first three days. At the end of September 1 it was shifted, as previously planned, to reinforce the 107th Motorized Division of the northern group. It was still regrouping in its new positions on September 3 when Army Group Center ordered a withdrawal of its forces from the salient, which was carried out over the next four days. General G.K. Zhukov gave the 309th little credit for this success, stating that "The... 309th... operated poorly and without initiative". It was not chosen to become one of the first four Guards rifle divisions. As of September 12 the rifle regiments of the division averaged only 657 men each, indicating excessive casualties.

At the beginning of Operation Typhoon the 309th was still holding positions on the right flank of 24th Army, and by October 7 was deeply encircled north of Spas-Demensk. The divisional headquarters had disintegrated by that date and was disbanded, although it appears some elements fought on separately for another week or so.

== 2nd Formation ==
A new rifle division, initially numbered the 449th, began forming south of Krasnoyarsk on December 30, 1941, under the command of Col. Aleksandr Nikolaievich Afanasev. It was re-designated as the second 309th Rifle Division in January, 1942. Its order of battle remained as previous, with the addition of the 343rd Antitank Battalion. The division spent about three months forming up in the Siberian Military District before moving west in April. In June it was assigned to the 6th Reserve Army, which became the 6th (active) Army on July 10, and joined Voronezh Front by the end of the month. The 309th remained in Voronezh Front, and its successor 1st Ukrainian Front, for the duration of the war. On November 10, Colonel Afanasev was promoted to Major General, but a week later was reassigned and replaced by Col. Pyotr Grigorevich Moskovsky.

The 309th remained in 6th Army until the end of 1942, when it was reassigned to the 40th Army. On January 7, 1943, Maj. Gen. Mikhail Ivanovich Menshikov took command of the division. During the Soviet winter offensive of 1942 - 43 the 309th took part in the liberation of Belgorod on February 9, and the town of Bogodukhov on the 17th, but these gains were later lost during the Third Battle of Kharkov. During this counteroffensive 40th Army was forced back into what became the Kursk Salient, and in March General Menshikov was listed as missing in action. He was replaced by Col. Dmitrii Feoktisovich Dryomin. The division spent the next months preparing for what the summer might bring.

== Battle of Kursk ==
In the lead-up to this battle, the 309th briefly became part of the 52nd Rifle Corps, still in 40th Army. That Army was in the front lines, somewhat to the west of the sectors where 4th Panzer Army would make its main attacks. By July 7, the third day of battle, the division was moved east to reinforce the 1st Guards Tank Army. Late on the fifth day it formed a line south of Novoselovka and halted, with the assistance of numerous supporting antitank and artillery units, an advance of the 11th Panzer Division. In the following days the 309th was subordinated to the 23rd Guards Rifle Corps of 6th Guards Army, where it remained until August. As the battle reached its height on July 12, the division, along with 204th Rifle Division and 3rd Tank Corps, was ordered to make a counterattack against the 11th Panzer and Großdeutschland divisions beginning at 0830 hours. This was a spoiling attack intending to disrupt these divisions as they regrouped for their own attack towards the Psel. The attack made little headway, and the tanks of 11th Panzer soon threw the 309th back to its start line, but the overall objective of holding the Germans in place was achieved. That evening the German offensive was officially discontinued.

== Battle of the Dniepr ==
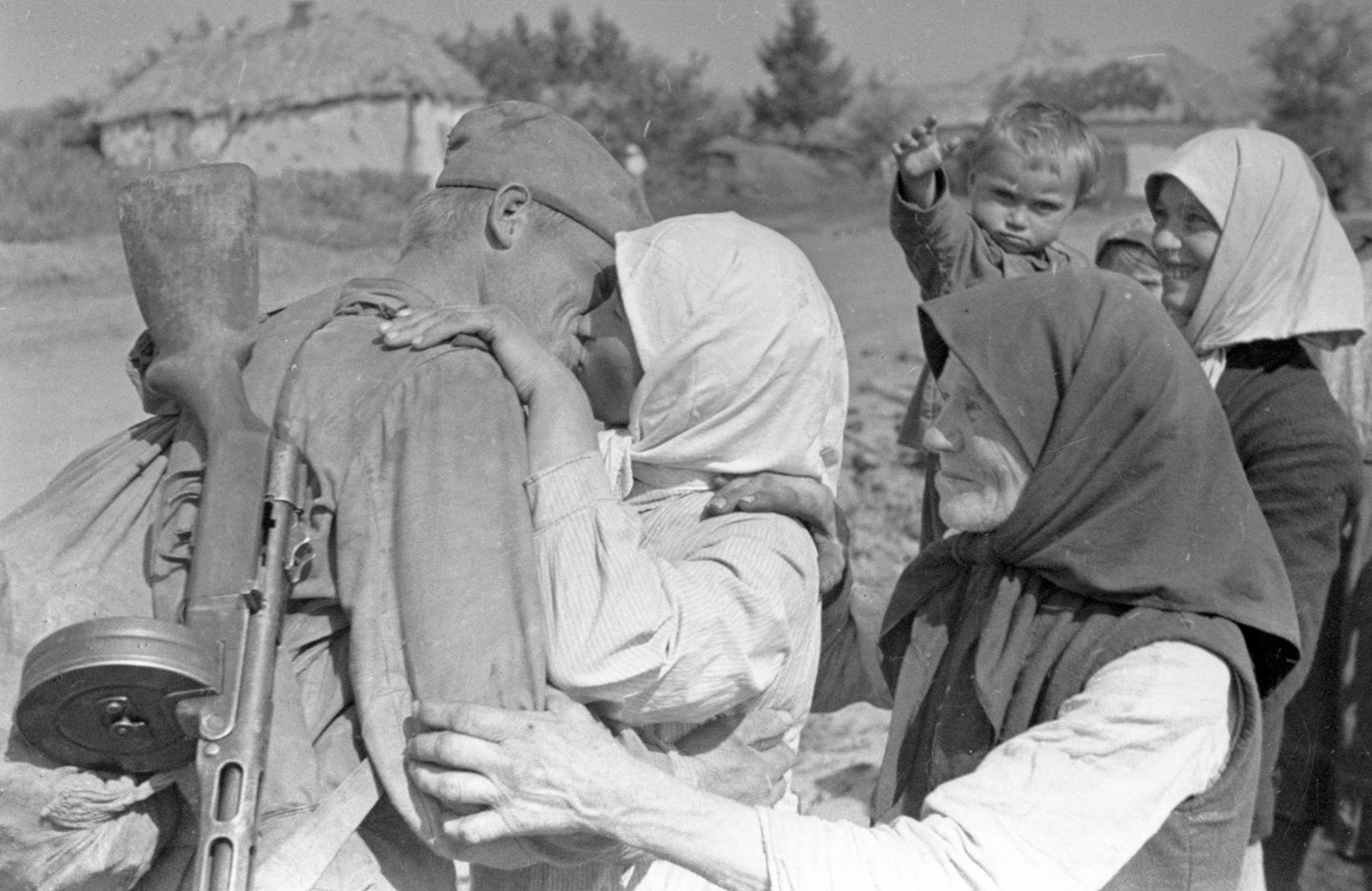
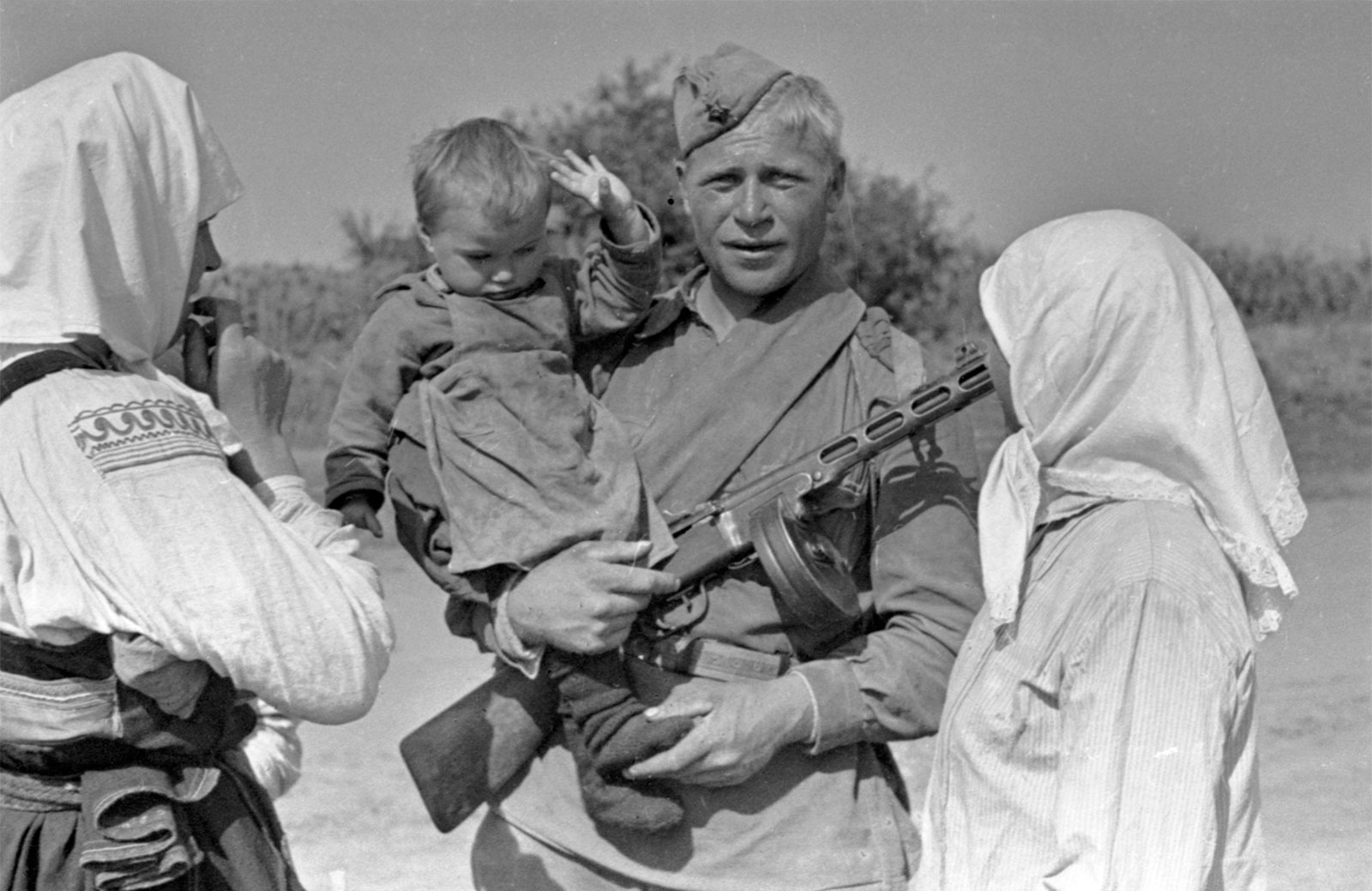
Sergeant Stepan Ivanovich Trifonov of the 309th's training company meets his wife and daughter in the village of Kazatskoye, Kursk Oblast, 3 August 1943. This was the last time he saw his family; Trifonov was killed during the forcing of the Dnieper.

In August the division was back in Gen. K.S. Moskalenko's 40th Army. During the next weeks the defeated German forces fell back through Ukraine as a race developed to reach the crossing points along the Dniepr River. Along this path, Colonel Dryomin was promoted to Major General on September 15, and three days later the 309th was credited with the liberation of the city of Piryatin, and was later given its name as an honorific:

"PIRYATIN" - The 52nd Rifle Corps... with its components, 309th Rifle Division (Maj. Gen. Dmitrii Feoktisovich Dryomin)...By order of the Supreme High Command is given this name.

Two days following, the forward detachment of the division, backed by elements of 10th Tank Corps, reached the river near the town of Rzhyshchev. The main crossing operation began on September 23. 40th Army, in conjunction with 3rd Guards Tank Army, seized four bridgeheads on the western bank, eventually forming what became known as the Bukrin Bridgehead. STAVKA had offered great rewards for the men who made this crossing and followed through: 136 officers and men of 40th Army, including no fewer than 47 of the 309th Rifle Division, were named as Heroes of the Soviet Union. One of those was General Dryomin:

"On October 23, 1943, for bravery, personal courage, and skillful command of the division, shown in fighting in the crossing of the Dniepr River, capturing and holding a bridgehead on the west bank of the river, Maj. Gen. Dryomin, Dmitrii Feoktisovich, is awarded the Order of Lenin, and the Gold Star Hero of the Soviet Union (no. 2156)

Over the following month, however, the Bukrin Bridgehead proved a dead end, due to difficult terrain, a strong German reaction, and the failure of a major Soviet airborne operation on the night of September 24–25. On October 23 Stalin informed Gen. N.F. Vatutin of 1st Ukrainian Front that it was "impossible to take Kiev from the south. Now take a look at the Lyutizh bridgehead which is north of Kiev and held by 38th Army." According to the new plan, 3rd Guards Tank Army and a rifle corps of 40th Army were secretly evacuated from Bukrin and moved to Lyutizh, as Moskalenko took command of 38th Army. On the morning of November 3, Soviet forces at Bukrin, which included the 309th, now in 27th Army, staged a diversionary attack while the forces at Lyutizh broke out of their bridgehead, and a day later Kiev was liberated.

== Advance ==
In late January, 1944, the divisional returns of the 309th showed the following strengths:

- 955th Rifle Regiment: 1187 officers and men with 518 rifles; 274 SMGs; 47 LMGs; 14 HMGs; 3 120 mm, 13 82 mm and 2 × 50 mm mortars; 4 76 mm howitzers; 5 × 45 mm guns; 21 AT rifles
- 957th Rifle Regiment: 1177 officers and men with 512 rifles; 149 SMGs; 22 LMGs; 8 HMGs; 5 × 120mm, 8 × 82 mm and 1 × 50 mm mortars; 2 76 mm howitzers; 4 × 45 mm guns; 12 AT rifles
- 959th Rifle Regiment: 1253 officers and men with 537 rifles; 115 SMGs; 64 LMGs; 9 HMGs; 5 × 120mm, 16 × 82 mm and 4 × 50 mm mortars; 3 76 mm howitzers; 6 × 45 mm guns; 14 AT rifles
- 842nd Artillery Regiment: 8 × 122 mm and 3 (captured German) 105 mm howitzers; 19 76 mm cannon; 7 AT rifles

The division briefly moved from 27th to 38th Army, then served from February until July 26 in 1st Guards Army. General Dryomin was reassigned to the 316th Rifle Division on April 7, and was eventually succeeded by Col. Mikhail Vasilevich Evstigneev. In July the 309th was reassigned to the 47th Rifle Corps in 13th Army, remaining there until December 20, and on September 9 its final commanding officer, Col. Boris Davidovich Lev, was assigned. Its final Army reassignment was a return to 6th Army, first in 74th Rifle Corps, then in 22nd Rifle Corps, and finally back in the 74th. The men and women of the division ended the war besieging Breslau, and on 4 June the division received its final award of the war, the Order of Kutuzov, 2nd class, for its role in the siege. Its final official title was the 309th Rifle, Piryatin, Order of the Red Banner, Order of Kutuzov Division. (Russian: 309-я стрелковая Пирятинская Краснознамённая ордена Кутузова дивизия.)

== Postwar ==
The division was disbanded in summer 1945 with the Central Group of Forces.
