= Ivan Galanin =

Soviet general (1899–1958)

Ivan Vasilievich Galanin
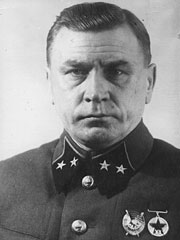
- Native name: Иван Васильевич Галанин
- Born: 25 July [O.S. 13 July] 1899; Pokrovka, Makaryevsky Uyezd, Nizhny Novgorod Governorate, Russian Empire
- Died: 12 November 1958 (aged 59) Moscow, Soviet Union
- Allegiance: Russian Soviet Federative Socialist Republic; Soviet Union
- Branch: Red Army
- Service years: 1919–1946
- Rank: Lieutenant general
- Commands: 57th Rifle Division; 17th Rifle Corps; 12th Army; 59th Army; 24th Army; 70th Army; 4th Guards Army; 53rd Army
- Conflicts: Russian Civil War; Battles of Khalkhin Gol; World War II
- Awards: Order of Lenin (2); Order of the Red Banner (2); Order of Kutuzov, 1st class (2); Order of Bogdan Khmelnitsky, 1st class; Order of the Red Banner (Mongolian People's Republic)

Ivan Vasilievich Galanin (Russian: Ива́н Васи́льевич Гала́нин; 25 July [O.S. 13 July] 1899–12 November 1958) was a Red Army lieutenant general during World War II.

Galanin was drafted into the Red Army in 1919 and fought as an ordinary soldier in the Russian Civil War. He became an officer during the interwar period and graduated from the Frunze Military Academy. Galanin then served in several staff positions in the Transbaikal Military District and commanded the 57th Rifle Division during the Battles of Khalkhin Gol in 1939. He was promoted to command the 17th Rifle Corps in Ukraine in 1940, and held that position when Operation Barbarossa, the German invasion of the Soviet Union, began. After leading the corps in the Battle of Uman and the retreat east through Ukraine, he took command of the 12th Army and then the 59th Army. From August 1942 he was deputy commander of the Voronezh Front, and in October he took command of the 24th Army, which he led in Operation Uranus. After leading the 70th Army in the Battle of Kursk, Galanin became commander of the 4th Guards Army, which he led for the rest of the war, except for a brief period as commander of the 53rd Army. Postwar, he was made deputy commander of a rifle corps, and retired in 1946.

== Early life and Russian Civil War ==
Born on 25 July 1899 in the village of Pokhorovka in Nizhny Novgorod Governorate, Galanin was drafted into the Red Army in April 1919. He was initially sent to the Simbirsk Reserve Regiment as an ordinary soldier. Galanin fought on the Eastern Front with the 296th Rifle Regiment, and from December served with the 2nd Brigade of the 25th Rifle Division. He joined the Communist Party in 1920. In April 1920, he transferred to the 38th VOKhR Battalion of the Urals Cheka. In June, Galanin was sent to study at the 2nd Moscow Infantry Courses. He led a cadet section in the suppression of the Kronstadt rebellion in March 1921.

== Interwar period ==
After graduating from the courses in 1923, Galanin commanded a platoon and a company of the Combined Military School. In October 1928, he became head of a special command, then a company commander of the Moscow Kremlin Commandant's Office. After graduating from Vystrel commander's improvement courses in June 1931, Galanin became a training company commander in the Moscow Proletarian Rifle Division's 2nd Rifle Regiment. He subsequently led a rifle company and battalion of the division and graduated from the Frunze Military Academy in 1936. From November 1937, Galanin served in the Transbaikal Military District headquarters as assistant chief of the 3rd Section of the 1st Staff Department, chief of the 4th Department, and deputy chief of staff of the district. In August 1938, he became commander of the 57th Rifle Division, which he led in the Battles of Khalkhin Gol in 1939. Promoted to Major General in June 1940, Galanin was transferred to the Kiev Special Military District to command its 17th Rifle Corps.

== World War II ==
After Operation Barbarossa, the German invasion of the Soviet Union, began on 22 June 1941, the corps, part of the 18th Army, fought in the border battles, attempting to repulse the German attack in Right-bank Ukraine. In July the corps, as part of the Southwestern Front and the Southern Front, fought to the west of Stanislav and in the Battle of Uman. Galanin took command of the Southern Front's 12th Army on 25 August, and 2 November he transferred to the Volkhov Front to command the 59th Army. After leading the latter during the Tikhvin counteroffensive, he became commander of the Galinin Army Group under the 16th Army in April 1942 on the Western Front.

In October 1942, he took command of the 24th Army of the Don Front, which was involved in the Battle of Stalingrad (including Operation Uranus). On January 27, 1943, Galanin was promoted to lieutenant general. From April 1943, he commanded the 70th Army of the Central Front, which took part in the Battle of Kursk and Operation Kutuzov. Galanin commanded the 4th Guards Army in the Belgorod-Kharkov Offensive Operation. From February 1944 he commanded the 53rd Army of the 2nd Ukrainian Front in the Battle of Cherkassy. Until November 1944, Galanin again commanded the 4th Guards Army in the Second Jassy–Kishinev Offensive and in Apatin-Kaposvar Operation. He was the first to be awarded the Order of Kutuzov 1st class.

After the war, he was deputy commander of the 7th Rifle Corps of the Soviet Armed Forces Group in Germany. He retired from active service in September 1946.
He died in 1958 and was buried in The Vedenskoye Cemetery in Moscow.
