= 120th Rifle Division =

- Active: I Formation: 1940–1941 II Formation: 1942–1943 III Formation: 1943–1945
- Country: Soviet Union
- Branch: Red Army
- Type: Infantry
- Engagements: World War II: Yelnya Offensive; Battle of Stalingrad; Leningrad-Novgorod Offensive; Battle of Narva (1944); Battle of Berlin
- Decorations: Order of the Red Banner (3rd formation)
- Battle honours: Gatchina (3rd formation)

The 120th Rifle Division was an infantry division of the Red Army, formed three times. Its first formation became the 6th Guards Rifle Division for its actions in the Yelnya Offensive. Its second formation became the 69th Guards Rifle Division for its actions in the Battle of Stalingrad. The division was reformed a third time in late April 1943. It was disbanded "in place" with the Central Group of Forces in the summer of 1945.

== First Formation ==
The 120th Rifle Division was formed in July 1940 in the Orel Region from the 35th Reserve Rifle Brigade under the command of Major General Konstantin Petrov, part of the 33rd Rifle Corps. The 120th Rifle Division was composed of the following units:

- 401st Rifle Regiment
- 474th Rifle Regiment
- 540th Rifle Regiment
- 606th Artillery Regiment
- 180th Separate Antitank Battalion
- 105th Separate Antiaircraft Artillery Battalion
- 150th Intelligence Company
- 193rd Sapper Battalion
- 224th Separate Communications Battalion
- 208th Medical Battalion
- 50th Separate Chemical Defense Company
- 187th Motor Transport Battalion
- 113th Field Bakery
- 164th Corps Veterinary Hospital
- 84th Field Post Office
- 81st Field Cash Office of the State Bank

On 28 June 1941, it was transferred to Bryansk. On 10 July it was concentrated in the Novoselki area west of Bryansk to establish a defensive line, including antitank ditches. The division became part of 24th Army on 15 July and was moved to the area 20 kilometers southeast of Yelnya. It went into combat on 30 July. Between August and September it fought in the Yelnya Offensive. The division helped capture Yelnya on 6 September. On 16 September, it was withdrawn from the front and sent to Stavka reserve in the Bologovsky District. On 26 September, the division became the 6th Guards Rifle Division for its actions at Yelnya.

== Second Formation ==
The division was reformed in Kazan from the 405th Rifle Division on 10 March 1942. 80% of the soldiers of the division were Kazakhs. The division was commanded by Colonel Nikolai Ryakin. The division included the following units:

- 289th Rifle Regiment
- 538th Rifle Regiment
- 543rd Rifle Regiment
- 1033rd Artillery Regiment
- 410th Separate Anti-Tank Battalion
- 464th Anti-Aircraft Truck Company
- 161st Intelligence Company
- 328th Sapper Battalion
- 678th Separate Communications Battalion
- 248th Medical-Sanitary Battalion
- 148th Separate Chemical Defense Company
- 532nd Road Transport Company
- 376th Field Bakery
- 847th Divisional Veterinary Hospital
- 1974th Field Post Office
- 1155th Field Cash Office of the State Bank

In May the 120th was assigned to 8th Reserve Army in the Reserve of the Supreme High Command. In June 1942 the division was moved by river to Saratov, where it received reinforcements. On 24 August, 8th Reserve was re-designated as 66th Army and was rushed to Stalingrad. The division was thrown into a series of costly counterattacks north of the city from 4 September. On 27 September Colonel Kirill Dzhakhua took command. By 20 October, at the outset of Don Front's Fourth Kotluban counteroffensive, the division was noted as being severely under strength, with roughly a battalion's worth of fighting men remaining.

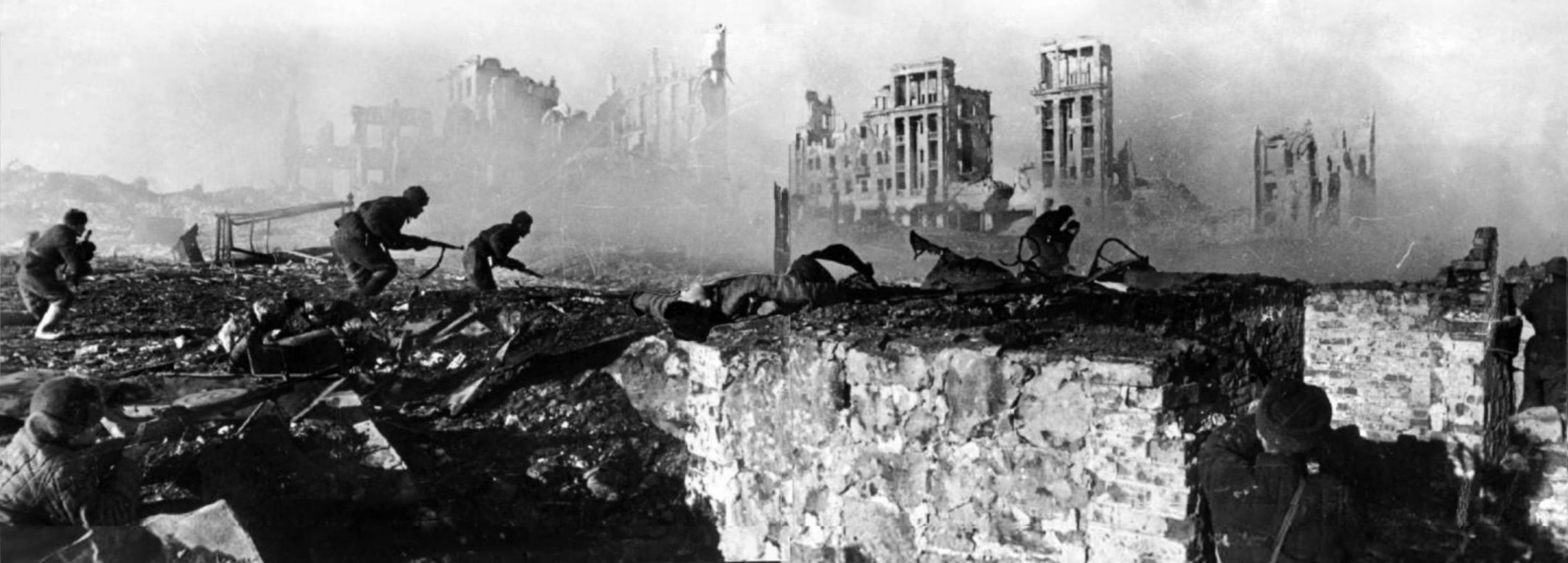
Soldiers storming a house during the Battle of Stalingrad, February 1943

Prior to the start of the Soviet counteroffensive at Stalingrad, the 120th had been transferred to 24th Army, still in the same general area, and rebuilt. On 22 November the division supported the army's shock group with two of its rifle regiments, but the attack made little progress against deeply dug-in German positions. Further efforts on the following three days were equally unsuccessful. However, once the Axis forces had been encircled, the 120th gave distinguished service during Operation Ring, finishing off the trapped German 6th Army. In recognition of this, on 6 February the division was converted into the 69th Guards Rifle Division for its actions.

== Third Formation ==
The division was reformed on 22 April 1943 from the 11th Rifle Brigade and the 142nd Naval Rifle Brigade on the Leningrad Front, part of the 67th Army, under command of 11th Rifle Brigade commander Colonel Alexei Batluk. The division included the following units:

- 289th Rifle Regiment
- 538th Rifle Regiment
- 543rd Rifle Regiment
- 1033rd Artillery Regiment
- 410th Separate Anti-Tank Battalion
- 161st Intelligence Company
- 328th Sapper Battalion
- 678th Separate Communications Battalion (later 709th Separate Communications Company)
- 248th Medical-Sanitary Battalion
- 148th Separate Chemical Defense Company
- 532nd Road Transport Company
- 376th Field Bakery
- 847th Divisional Veterinary Hospital
- 2276th Field Post Office
- 1216th Field Cash Office of the State Bank

Between July and early September it was part of the 2nd Shock Army, but then was returned to 67th Army. During the Sixth Sinyavino offensive the 120th provided right flank support to the 30th Guards Rifle Corps, which was finally able to storm and hold the Sinyavino heights on 15 September, although the offensive bogged down and was halted three days later. The division transferred to front reserve later that month. On 13 November the 120th was assigned to 117th Rifle Corps, where it would remain for most of the duration.

In January 1944 it became part of the 59th Army. The division fought in the Leningrad–Novgorod Offensive, during which it participated in the capture of Gatchina (formerly Krasnogvardeysk) on 25 January, penetrating into the northeastern section of the town from the north, just as 108th Rifle Corps was seizing the northwestern sector. After an all-night battle, the town was completely cleared the following morning:

"Wednesday, 26 January. The battle for Gatchina did not cease throughout the night. The enemy 11th Infantry Division, which has been defending the city, has been destroyed. At 1100 hours Colonel A.V. Batluk's 120th Rifle Division, cooperating with Colonel F.A. Burmistrov's 224th Rifle Division and other units, completely cleared the occupiers from Gatchina."

On 27 January 1944 it was awarded the honorific "Gatchina". The division received the Order of the Red Banner for helping to liberate Luga on 12 February. In April 1944, the division became part of the 8th Army. In late July and August the division fought in the Battle of Tannenberg Line, part of the Battle of Narva (1944). It was part of the 117th Rifle Corps during the battle. The division attacked the Grenadier Hill from the east on 29 July. The division suffered casualties of 1,808 men killed or wounded during the attack. In August it became part of the 2nd Shock Army again. On 31 August Colonel Matvei Fedotov took command. In September 1944 the division, with its corps, was briefly moved to the Reserve of the Supreme High Command, where it became part of the 21st Army. On 11 December Ivan Govorov became the division's commander. In that same month, 21st Army was assigned to 1st Ukrainian Front, and the 120th would remain in that front and army, in either 55th or 117th Rifle Corps, for the duration. It was disbanded "in place" in the summer of 1945 with the Central Group of Forces.
