= 27th Mechanized Corps =

- Active: 1941
- Country: Soviet Union
- Branch: Red Army
- Type: Mechanized corps

Commanders
- Notable commanders: Ivan Yefimovich Petrov

The 27th Mechanized Corps (Military Unit Number 2850) was a mechanized corps of the Red Army. Stationed in present-day Uzbekistan and Turkmenistan after its formation in March 1941, the corps was relocated westwards after the German invasion of the Soviet Union. As a result of the reorganization of the Soviet mechanized corps, the 27th Mechanized Corps was disbanded before it saw combat.

== History ==
=== Formation ===
The corps was formed in March 1941 in Mary in the Central Asian Military District. The corps included the previously formed 9th Tank Division at Mary, and the new 53rd Tank Division at Kyzyl-Arvat, as well as the new 221st Motorized Division at Samarkand. The corps was commanded by Major General Ivan Yefimovich Petrov.

=== World War II ===
On 22 June 1941, Operation Barbarossa, the German invasion of the Soviet Union, began. At the time the corps was equipped with 356 tanks. On 25 June the corps was alerted for movement to the west. On 27 June the first echelon of the 9th Tank Division moved west by rail, followed by the rest of the division. Moving through Tashkent and Orenburg, the division's first echelon reached Voronezh on 8 July. On 8 July, the Soviet General Staff decided to disband the mechanized corps and reorganize the tank divisions as a result of heavy tank losses in the first days of the war. The division's headquarters arrived at Voronezh on 10 July. The 27th Mechanized Corps was to become part of the 28th Army at Kirov. Unloading was to be carried out at the Fayansovaya railway station to the north of Kirov. The trains transporting the corps began to arrive at the station the next day, unloading only at night due to German air superiority. Many trains were delayed due to damage to the railway tracks, including one tank battalion that was stuck at Bryansk station for three days. By 15 July, the concentration of the 9th Tank Division had been completed with 208 tanks (mostly T-26s and BT-7s). At the same time the 9th Tank Division had become the 104th Tank Division, the 53rd Tank Division the 105th Tank Division, and the 221st Motorized Division the 106th Tank Division. The corps was disbanded on 15 July, and the 106th Tank Division became the 106th Motorized Division on 19 July.
