= Konstantin Rakutin =

Red Army general (1902–1941)

Konstantin Ivanovich Rakutin
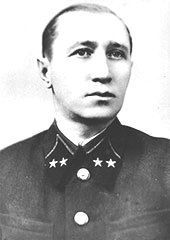
- Rakutin in 1940
- Born: 3 June [O.S. 21 May] 1902; Novinki, Muromsky Uyezd, Vladimir Governorate, Russian Empire
- Died: 7 October 1941 (aged 39) near Semlyovo, Vyazemsky District, Smolensk Oblast, Soviet Union
- Military career
- Allegiance: Russian SFSR; Soviet Union
- Branch: Red Army; Soviet Border Troops
- Service years: 1919–1941
- Rank: Major general
- Commands: 31st Army; 24th Army
- Conflicts: Russian Civil War; Polish–Soviet War; World War II †
- Awards: Hero of the Soviet Union; Order of Lenin; Order of the Patriotic War, 1st class; Order of the Red Star

Konstantin Ivanovich Rakutin (Russian: Константин Иванович Ракутин; 3 June [O.S. 21 May] 1902 – 7 October 1941) was a Red Army major general who served in World War II.

A veteran of the Russian Civil War and Polish–Soviet War, Rakutin became an officer in the Border Troops during the interwar period, rising to chief of staff of the Leningrad Border District in the late 1930s. He was chief of the Baltic Border District when Operation Barbarossa, and was swiftly appointed commander of the 31st Army. Rakutin led the 24th Army in the costly but successful Yelnya Offensive during Operation Barbarossa, shortly before the Battle of Moscow. During the latter's first days he fell in combat. Rakutin was posthumously awarded the title Hero of the Soviet Union for his leadership during the offensive in 1990.

== Early life and Russian Civil War ==
Rakutin was born on 3 June 1902 in the village of Novinki, Yakovtsevskoy volost, Vladimir Governorate. In 1917 he graduated from a realschule in Nizhny Novgorod and worked at the Nizhny Novgorod executive committee as a ledger clerk. He served in the Red Army from July 1919, graduating from the Tambov Infantry Courses for Red Commanders in December of that year. Appointed military commissar of the training school of the 9th Volga Regiment, Rakutin fought in the Russian Civil War on the Eastern Front against the forces of Alexander Kolchak. During the Polish–Soviet War he became an assistant company commander in the 473rd Rifle Regiment of the 53rd Rifle Division, fighting on the Western Front. Rakutin's unit was forced to retreat into East Prussia with the 4th Army by the Polish counteroffensive of August 1920 and in 1921 he returned to the Soviet Union from an internment camp there. Later that year, Rakutin fought against White and Japanese forces with the People's Revolutionary Army of the Far Eastern Republic, serving as a company commander of the 5th Chita Regiment. In February 1922 he distinguished himself in the storming of Volochayevka.

== Interwar period ==
Rakutin transferred to the OGPU Border Troops after the end of the Russian Civil War in 1922, becoming political officer of the Amur Border Cavalry Squadron. He became commandant of a sector of the Bikin Border Detachment in 1924 and chief of the border commandant's service in Nikolayevsk-on-Amur in 1925. Appointed chief of the Separate Okhotsk Border Commandant's Service and simultaneous deputy chairman of the Okhotsky District Executive Committee in 1927, he distinguished himself in the suppression of the Yakut revolt that year. After graduating from the Higher Border School of the OGPU in 1931, Rakutin was appointed assistant chief of the training department of the 1st Novo-Peterhof School of Border and Internal Guards of the OGPU.

From November 1936 he served as chief of the training department of the 2nd Kharkov School of Border and Internal Guards of the NKVD, and in 1937 graduated from the night school faculty of the Frunze Military Academy. Appointed chief of the 13th Berezino Border Detachment in Belarus in 1937, Rakutin advanced to become chief of staff of the Leningrad Border District in 1939. Appointed chief of staff of the Directorate of NKVD Border Troops of the Leningrad District in September of that year, he served as assistant commander of the forces of the 15th Army for rear protection during the Winter War. Promoted to kombrig in February 1940, Rakutin became a major general when the Red Army introduced general officer ranks on 4 June 1940. He was appointed chief of the Baltic Border District in July of that year.

== World War II ==
After the beginning of Operation Barbarossa in June 1941, Rakutin was appointed commander of the 31st Army of the Reserve of the Supreme High Command in late June, forming in the Moscow Military District. This proved brief as he transferred to command the 24th Army of the Reserve Front in July, leading it in the Battle of Smolensk. The 24th Army conducted near-constant assaults on German defenses at Yelnya from 8 August, but the attacks had to be halted due to heavy losses on 20 August. The Yelnya Offensive resumed on 30 August and on 8 September 1941 the army captured Yelnya. For their actions, five divisions of the army became the first Guards units as the victory was trumpeted in Soviet propaganda. However, the opposing German forces were allowed to retreat, albeit suffering losses that could not be easily replaced. In early October the 24th Army was surrounded in the Vyazma Pocket, created by the Operation Typhoon. During the attempted breakout of the army from the encirclement, Rakutin was killed in action near the village of Semlyovo, Smolensk Oblast on 7 October. One of the last to see him alive was Red Army man A. Suslov of the army headquarters guard battalion, who recalled that Rakutin ordered the burning of the army documents after the failure of the breakout attempt.

Rakutin was removed from the rolls of the Red Army in 1943 as missing in action. He was declared dead postwar in 1946, but the location and circumstances of his death remained unknown. His place of death was discovered by members of the Search Movement and in 1996 his remains were reburied at the military cemetery in Snegiri. For his "courage and heroism displayed in the struggle against the German Fascist invaders during the Great Patriotic War," Rakutin was posthumously awarded the title Hero of the Soviet Union and the Order of Lenin on 5 May 1990.

== Awards and honors ==
Rakutin received the following awards and decorations:

- Hero of the Soviet Union (5 May 1990)
- Order of Lenin (5 May 1990)
- Order of the Patriotic War, 1st class (1965)
- Order of the Red Star (1941)
- Jubilee Medal "XX Years of the Workers' and Peasants' Red Army" (1938)
- Honorary weapon

== See also ==
- List of solved missing person cases (pre-1950)
