= 103rd Rifle Division =

- Active: 1939–1946
- Country: Soviet Union
- Branch: Red Army
- Type: Infantry
- Size: Division
- Engagements: World War II: Yelnya Offensive; Second Battle of Kharkov; Soviet invasion of Manchuria
- Battle honours: Khingan (3rd formation)

The 103rd Rifle Division was an infantry division of the Red Army, formed three times. It was first formed in 1939. It was converted into a motorized division and fought in the Yelnya Offensive. After being converted back to a rifle division it was destroyed in the Battle of Vyazma. The division reformed in early 1942 but was destroyed during the Second Battle of Kharkov. It was reformed a third time in the Far East in summer 1942 and participated in the Soviet invasion of Manchuria.

== History ==
=== First Formation ===
The division was formed at Voroshilovsk in August and September 1939 from the 35th Rifle Regiment of the 74th Rifle Division. The division was converted to a motorized division in March 1941, part of the 26th Mechanized Corps. On 8 July the division became the 103rd Tank Division as a result of the reorganization of Red Army mechanized forces. During July and August, it fought in the Yelnya Offensive as part of the corps, now subordinated to the 24th Army. On 28 August, it became a rifle division again. In October 1941, it was surrounded and destroyed in the Spas-Demensky District, trapped in the Vyazma Pocket. However, the division was only disbanded on 27 December, despite coming out of the encirclement with only thirty men.

=== Second Formation ===
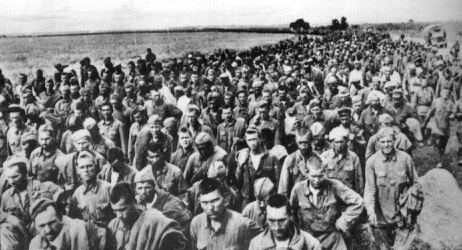
Soviet prisoners of war after the Second Battle of Kharkov

The division was reformed on 9 January 1942 from the 463rd Rifle Division (originally formed 22 December 1941) at Samarkand. The 103rd was composed of the 393rd, 583rd and 688th Rifle Regiments. In early March, the division was relocated to Starobilsk with the 28th Army and fought in the Second Battle of Kharkov during May 1942. Due to supply shortages the division was not provided with food from 28 April to 2 May. On 19 May, it became part of 6th Army but was surrounded and destroyed at Izyum between 25 and 27 May. The division was officially disbanded on 30 June 1942.

=== Third Formation ===
The division was reformed a third time on 21 July 1942 in the Transbaikal Military District and served there for the duration of the war. It was with the 2nd Rifle Corps in Transbaikal Front in January 1945. During August and September 1945, it fought in the Soviet invasion of Manchuria. For its actions, the division was awarded the honorific "Khingan". It was disbanded in 1946 in the Transbaikal-Amur Military District.
