= 4th Guards Army =

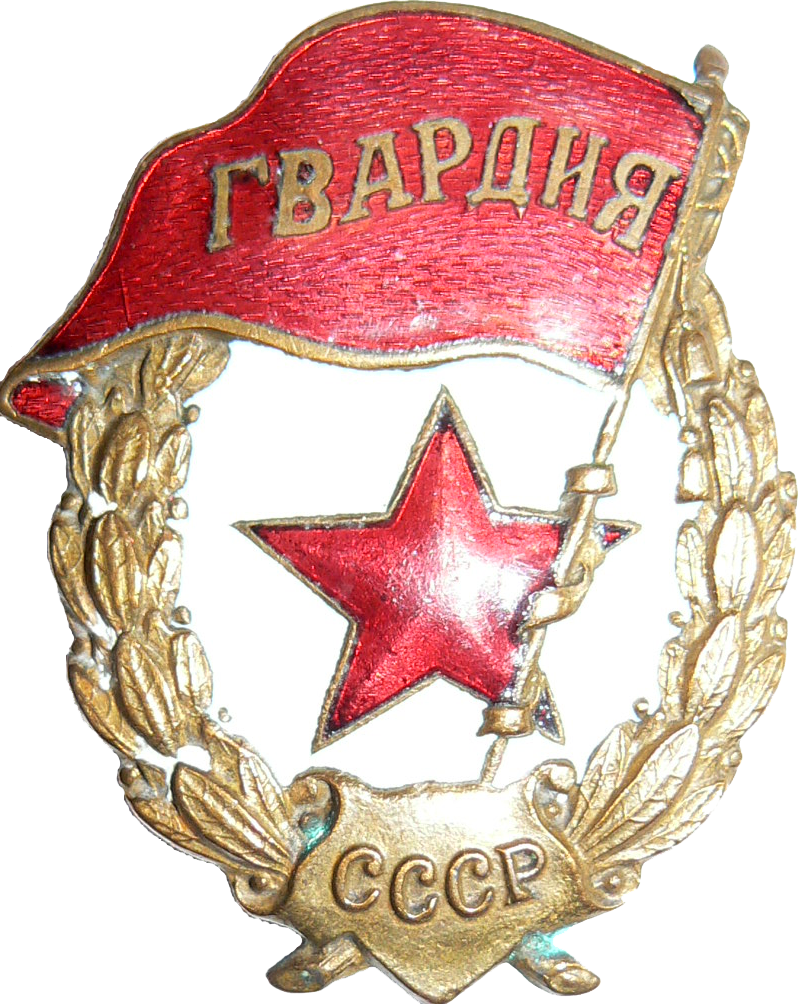
- Active: 1943–1947
- Country: Soviet Union
- Branch: Red Army / Soviet Army
- Type: Field army
- Engagements: World War II; Battle of Kursk; Battle of the Dnieper; Dnieper-Carpathian Offensive; Battle of Korsun–Cherkassy; Uman–Botoșani Offensive; Second Jassy–Kishinev Offensive; Budapest Offensive; Vienna Offensive

Commanders
- Notable commanders: Grigory Kulik; Georgiy Zakharov

The 4th Guards Army was an elite Guards field army of the Soviet Union during World War II and the early postwar era.

== History ==
On April 16, 1943, the Supreme Command ordered the army to be established. On May 5, 1943, the army was formed on the basis of the 24th Army in the Steppe Military District. It included the 20th and 21st Guards Rifle and 3rd Guards Tank Corps. On July 3 the Army was placed in Stavka reserve, on July 18 included in the Steppe Front, and on July 23 once again put in Stavka reserve.

The Army fought in decisive actions such as the Battle of Kursk, the Second Jassy–Kishinev Offensive, the struggle for central Hungary, and the Vienna Offensive. At the end of the war, the Fourth Guards Army was part of the 3rd Ukrainian Front.

It was disbanded in March 1947.

== Part of fronts ==
- Steppe Front
- Voronezh Front
- 2nd Ukrainian Front
- 3rd Ukrainian Front

== Army commanders ==
=== Commanders ===
- Lieutenant General Grigory Kulik (7 April – 22 September 1943)
- Lieutenant General Aleksei Zygin (22–27 September 1943)
- Lieutenant General Ivan Galanin (September 1943 – January 1944, February–November 1944)
- Major General Alexander Ryzhov (January–February 1944)
- Lieutenant General Ilya Smirnov (3–22 February 1944)
- Army General Georgiy Zakharov (November 1944 – March 1945)
- Lieutenant General Nikanor Zakhvatayev (1 March 1945 – July 1945)
- Colonel General Dmitry Gusev (July 1945 - March 1946)
- Colonel General Vladimir Romanovsky (May 1946- 1948)

=== Members of the Military Soviet (council) ===
This Political commissar position was intended to maintain control by the Communist Party.

- Colonel, General-major I.A Gavrilov
- Colonel Dmitry Shepilov
- Colonel Commissar M.M. Stahursky
- General-major V.N. Semenov
- General-major Leonid Bocharov (fr:Léonid Botcharov)

== Order of battle ==
The order of battle for the Fourth Guards Army on May 1, 1945, was:

Fourth Guards Army

20th Guards Rifle Corps

5th Guards Airborne Division
7th Guards Airborne Division
80th Guards Rifle Division

21st Guards Rifle Corps

41st Guards Rifle Division
62nd Guards Rifle Division
66th Guards Rifle Division
69th Guards Rifle Division

31st Guards Rifle Corps

4th Guards Rifle Division
34th Guards Rifle Division
40th Guards Rifle Division

123rd Gun-Artillery Brigade
438th Antitank Regiment
466th Mortar Regiment
257th Anti-aircraft Regiment
56th Engineer-Sapper Brigade

After the war for a period the 4th Guards Army joined the Central Group of Forces in Austria until its withdrawal.

== Article Sources ==
- The Red Army Order of Battle in the Great Patriotic War, Robert G. Poirier and Albert Z. Conner, Novato: Presidio Press, 1985. ISBN 0-89141-237-9.
- Combat composition of the Soviet Army (official Soviet order of battle from General Staff archives), Moscow: Ministry of Defense, 1990.
