= Rifle corps =

Soviet military formation

A rifle corps (Russian: стрелковый корпус, romanized: strelkovyy korpus) was a Soviet corps-level military formation during the mid-twentieth century. Rifle corps were made up of a varying number of rifle divisions, although the allocation of three rifle divisions to a rifle corps was common during the latter part of World War II.

Unlike army corps formed by Germany and the Western Allies, Soviet rifle corps were composed primarily of combat troops and had only a small logistical component. Because the rifle divisions themselves were also primarily made up of combat troops, the rifle corps were numerically smaller than corps of other nations. The Soviets also formed Guards rifle corps during World War II, although these were often assigned control of regular rifle divisions and sometimes controlled no Guards rifle divisions.

The Red Army as a whole had 27 rifle corps headquarters in its order of battle on 1 June 1938; this had been expanded to 62 by June 1941. When Germany invaded the Soviet Union on June 22, 1941, the Red Army initially had some 32 rifle corps headquarters as part of their order of battle in action against the Germans. Because Joseph Stalin's prewar purge of the Red Army had removed so many experienced leaders, the rifle corps echelon of command in Soviet forces engaged against the Germans dwindled in the face of massive Red Army losses of 1941. The stark shortage of experienced leaders forced the Red Army to have rifle army headquarters directly supervising rifle divisions without the assistance of intervening rifle corps headquarters. The use of rifle corps headquarters never disappeared entirely from the Red Army during World War II, as field armies in areas not fighting the Germans (such as the Far East) maintained their use of rifle corps headquarters during the entire war.

An example of wartime rifle corps organization is that of the 8th Estonian Rifle Corps in 1942:

- 8th Rifle Corps
  - 7th Rifle Division
  - 249th Rifle Division
  - 85th Corps Artillery Regiment
  - 36th Sapper Battalion
  - 86th Medical Battalion
  - 482nd Reconnaissance Company
  - 162nd Machine Gun Battalion

Of the 8th Rifle Corps' 1942 strength of 26,466 men, only 2,599 (less than 10 per cent) made up the corps headquarters and corps assets, the remainder being assigned to the two rifle divisions.

By November 1941, the Soviet order of battle showed only one rifle corps headquarters still active among the forces fighting the German invasion. By early 1942, however, the Soviets began to reactivate rifle corps headquarters for use as an intermediate command echelon between the rifle armies and rifle divisions. Doubtlessly, the direct command of divisions by army headquarters resulted in too-large spans of control for army commanders and the Red Army desired to reintroduce the rifle corps headquarters once enough experienced commanders and staff officers were available. By the end of 1942, 21 rifle corps headquarters were in action with Soviet forces engaging the Germans. This grew to over 100 by the end of 1943, and reached a peak of 174 either in action against the Germans or as part of the strategic reserve of the Stavka by the end of the war with Germany in May 1945.

Circa September 1945, the 11, 15, 16, 21, 22, 25, 28, 36, 42, 43, 44, 47, 51, 52, 55, 61, 62, 64, 67, 68, 70, 71, 74, 77, 80, 89, 91, 93, 95, 96, 98, 100, 106, 115, 117, 118, 120, 121, 133, and 135th Rifle Corps were disbanded.

A limited number of Rifle Corps remained as part of the Ground Forces post 1945. They were converted to 'Army Corps' in 1955 though they still mostly consisted of Rifle and then Motor Rifle Divisions.

== List of Soviet rifle corps ==
=== Formed before 22 June 1941 ===
==== 1–10 Corps ====
- 1st Rifle Corps – 10th Army, Western Special MD, under General Major F.D. Rubtsov with 2nd and 8th Rifle Divisions. Last mention in the Soviet Order of Battle (OOB) on 1 July 1941 with corps directly subordinated to the Western Front. The corps reappeared in the OOB on 1 June 1942 directly subordinated to the North Caucasus Front, and made up of four rifle brigades. Thereafter, the last 1942 OOB mention of the corps is on 1 August 1942. The 1st Rifle Corps reappears in the Soviet OOB on 1 September 1943 as part of the Northwestern Front. Final mention on 1 May 1945 subordinated to the 1st Shock Army and in command of the 306th, 344th, and 357th Rifle Divisions. Feskov et al. 2004 says the corps headquarters, as well as the 4th Shock Army, was moved to Central Asia after the end of the war and established at Ashgabat. In 1969, the corps headquarters was moved to Semipalatinsk, where it was raised in status to become 32nd Army. A tank division may have moved to Semipalatinsk alongside the corps headquarters.
- 2nd Rifle Corps – formed in September 1922 as the 2nd Army Corps. As part of 13th Army Western Front participated in the Battle of Bialystok-Minsk near the Minsk and Slutsky Fortified Regions. in late June – early July, 1941. Reformed and fought against Japan in 1945. On 1 July 1945, was part of the Transbaikal Front and comprised 103rd, 275th, and 292nd Rifle Divisions.
- 3rd Rifle Corps- 4th Rifle Division, 20th Mountain Rifle, 47th Mtn Rifle, as part of Transcaucasus Military District.
- 4th Rifle Corps – 27th, 56th, and 85th Rifle Divisions, as part of 3rd Army. (See ru:4-й стрелковый корпус (1-го формирования)). On 1 July 1945 the second formation of the corps was part of the Belomorsky Military District in the north, with 25th, 289th, and 341st Rifle Divisions.
- 5th Rifle Corps – 13th, 86th, and 113th Rifle Divisions, part of 10th Army, WSMD. Reactivated 27 June 1942, often known as 5th independent Rifle Corps. On 1 July 1945 consisted of 35th Rifle Division (Soviet Union) and 390th Rifle Division (Soviet Union). With 2nd Far East Front during the Soviet invasion of Manchuria in 1945, then transferred to 15th Army (Soviet Union) (August–October 1945) and then the Far Eastern Military District. On 1 January 1946 it consisted of the 34th Rifle Division (Vyazemskiy, Khabarovsk Kray), and the 35th Rifle Division (Bikin, Khabarovsk Kray), and was part of the Far Eastern Military District. It was disbanded in July 1946.
- 6th Rifle Corps – The 6th Rifle Corps HQ was formed in Kiev in May 1922. The Corps was formed on the orders of the Commander of the Armed Forces of Ukraine and Crimea number 627/162 from May 23, 1922 in Kiev, part of Kiev and Kharkov Military District.
- 7th Rifle Corps – in the Odessa Military District, under General Major K.L. Dobroserdov included 116th, 196th, and 206th Rifle Divisions. Finished war as part of 3rd Shock Army.
- 8th Rifle Corps – 26th Army, Kiev Special Military District, under General Major M.G. Snegov with 99th, 173rd Rifle Divisions and 72nd Mountain Rifle Division Became 41st Guards Rifle Corps 1945, spent last of its war service in the 42nd Army, Courland Group, Leningrad Front.
- 9th Rifle Corps – In June, 1941, General Lieutenant Pavel Batov was in command of the 9th Separate Rifle Corps, which comprised the 106th and 156th Rifle Divisions and the 32nd Cavalry Division, with a total strength of about 35,000 men. This corps was the only major Red Army formation in the Crimea, Odessa Military District at the outbreak of Operation Barbarossa, and Batov had arrived at its headquarters in Simferopol just two days earlier. In 1945 during the final Battle of Berlin the corps was part of 5th Shock Army and comprised the 230th, 248th, and 301st Rifle Divisions. Served with the 3rd Shock Army, later 3rd Combined Arms Army, from 1947– 56. From 1947 consisted of 94th Guards Rifle Division (Schwerin) and 18th Mechanised Division (Perleberg). Disbanded 4 July 1956.
- 10th Rifle Corps -assigned to the 8th Army in the Baltic Military District (BSMD). Included the 10th, 48th, and 90th Rifle Divisions. The corps arrived in the Urals Military District comprising the 91st, 279th, and 347th Rifle Divisions. Active in 1948 with three rifle brigades (12th, 14th and 40th (Kirov, Kirov Oblast)). 12th Brigade was disbanded, 14th Rifle Brigade became 91st Rifle Division in October 1953, and 40th Brigade was briefly 194th Rifle Division (1951–53) before becoming 65th Mechanised Division. Corps HQ moved to Vilnius in June 1956, becoming part of 11th Guards Army, and took over 26th Guards Rifle and 71st Mechanised Divisions. Became 10th Army Corps on 4 June 1957 but disbanded in June 1960.

==== 11–20 Corps ====
- 11th Rifle Corps – assigned to the 8th Army in the Baltic Special Military District, with the 11th, and 125th Rifle Divisions. Disbanded circa September 1945, by Stavka VGK Order 11097 of 29.5.45, which established the Northern Group of Forces.
- 12th Rifle Corps – Transbaikal Military District, with 65th and 94th Rifle Divisions on 22 June 1941. Disbanded July 1941. Reformed October 1942. 1 November 1942 listed with reserves, Black Sea Group of Forces, with the 77th, 261st, 349th, and 351st Rifle Divisions by BSSA. A month later it consisted of the 261, 349, 351, and 406th Rifle Divisions. January 1943 was with Transcaucasus Front, 45th Army, with 261, 349, 392, and 406th Rifle Divisions. 12th Mountain Rifle Corps for a period. 1946 to 1957 in North Caucasus Military District before becoming 12th Army Corps.
- 13th Rifle Corps – First formed 1922 and disbanded 1935. Reformed 1936, in 12th Army, Kiev Special Military District, under General Major N.K. Kirillov, with 44th, 58th, and 192nd Mountain Rifle Divisions on 22 June 1941. Appears to have spent much of 1945 within the Front Troops of Transcaucasus Front, consisting of 392nd Rifle Division and 94th Rifle Brigade. On 1 January 1948, still with Transcaucasus Military District, comprising 10th Guards Rifle Division and 414th Rifle Division. By January 1951 it had become 13th Mountain Rifle Corps, with 10th Guards Mountain Rifle Division, and 145th Mountain Rifle Division. (Feskov et al 2013, 53), and was still in that configuration in 1954 (Feskov et al 2013, 55). Disbanded by being redesignated 31st Special Rifle Corps on 1 July 1956, and then successively 31st Special Army Corps (1 October 1957) and 31st Army Corps (9 May 1961).
- 14th Rifle Corps – 9th Army, Odessa Military District, under General Major D.G. Egorov comprising the 25th and 51st Rifle Divisions. By the end of the war, 14th Rifle Corps was a direct-reporting formation of 2nd Belorussian Front, including 90th Guards Rifle Division. Disbanded by Stavka VGK Order 11097 of 29.5.45, which established the Northern Group of Forces.
- 15th Rifle Corps – Kiev Special Military District assigned to the 5th Army with the 45th, and 62nd Rifle Divisions. Disbanded summer 1945.
- 16th Rifle Corps – assigned to the 11th Army in the Baltic Military District, including the 5th, 33rd, and 188th Rifle Divisions. Used to form Headquarters, 48th Army on 7 August 1941. Reformed in Transcaucasian Front on 20 November 1942. Disbanded summer 1945.
- 17th Rifle Corps – 12th Army, Kiev Special MD, under General Major I.V. Galanin comprising the 60th, 69th Mountain Rifle, and 164th Rifle Divisions.
- 18th Rifle Corps
  - Headquarters formed in October 1923 at Kazan with the Volga Military District and disbanded in December of that year.
  - Headquarters reformed in July 1924 with the Siberian Military District, mostly stationed at Irkutsk during existence. Transferred to the Special Red Banner Far Eastern Army August 1929 and used to form headquarters of the Transbaikal Group of Forces of the army in February 1932.
  - 18th Rifle Corps (1st formation) – Headquarters reformed in February 1934 from a cadre of the 19th Rifle Corps, then transferred to Special Red Banner Far Eastern Army a month later. Headquarters located at Kuybyshevka-Vostochnaya during the late 1930s. Became headquarters of the 2nd Army of the Far Eastern Front between July and September 1938, then restored as part of 2nd Independent Red Banner Army. With 15th Army of the Far Eastern Front on 22 June 1941, assigned 34th Rifle Division and 202nd Airborne Brigade. Headquarters used to form that of the 35th Army in July 1941.
  - 18th Rifle Corps (2nd formation) – Headquarters reformed in December 1942, assigned to Voronezh Front reserve, and disbanded in February 1943.
  - 18th Rifle Corps (3rd formation) – Headquarters reformed in February 1943 with the 3rd Guards Army of the Southwestern Front. Became 34th Guards Rifle Corps on 25 April.
  - 18th Rifle Corps (4th formation) – Reformed 1 June 1943. On 10 May 1945 it included the 37th Guards Rifle Division, 15th Rifle Division, and 69th Rifle Division, reporting to 65th Army. After a rapid period of redesignations and reassignments, the corps was moved to Łódź in Poland where by July 1946 it was controlling the 26th Guards Mechanised Division (Borne Sulinovo) and 26th Rifle Division (Łódź). It remained under the control of the Northern Group of Forces from 12 June 1946 until it was disbanded in July 1952.
- 19th Rifle Corps
  - Headquarters formed July 1924 at Khabarovsk with the Siberian Military District and received Primorsky honorific in October of that year. Transferred to the Special Red Banner Far Eastern Army August 1929 and renamed Primorsky Rifle Corps in 1930.
  - 19th Rifle Corps (1st formation) – Headquarters reformed July 1930 at Leningrad with the Leningrad Military District. Assigned to the 23rd Army of the Leningrad Military District with the 115th and 142nd Rifle Divisions on 22 June 1941. Headquarters used to form headquarters of the 2nd Neva Operational Group on 25 October.
  - 19th Rifle Corps (2nd formation) – Headquarters reformed in February 1943 with the 1st Guards Army of the Southwestern Front. Became 29th Guards Rifle Corps on 16 April.
  - 19th Rifle Corps (3rd formation) – Headquarters reformed during June 1943 in the Volga Military District. In reserve of the Courland Group of Forces of the Leningrad Front on 1 May 1945, assigned the 43rd Rifle Division. With 7th Guards Army in the Transcaucasian Military District from late 1945, redesignated as mountain rifle corps during early 1950s. Became 19th Army Corps in June 1957.
- 20th Rifle Corps
  - Headquarters formed May 1936 at Khabarovsk with the Special Red Banner Far Eastern Army from the Special Kolkhoz Corps. Became headquarters of the Khabarovsk Group of Forces of the Far Eastern Front between July and September 1938, then reverted to 20th Rifle Corps designation as part of 2nd Independent Red Banner Army at Birobidzhan. Headquarters disbanded July 1940 and used to form 15th Army headquarters.
  - 20th Rifle Corps (1st formation) – Headquarters reformed with the Moscow Military District in July 1940. Assigned 137th and 160th Rifle Divisions, as part of the Reserve of the Supreme High Command (RVGK) on 22 June 1941. Headquarters disbanded 16 August and used to form Bryansk Front headquarters.
  - 20th Rifle Corps (2nd formation) – Headquarters reformed in February 1943 with the 18th Army of the Black Sea Group of Forces of the North Caucasian Front. Awarded Brest honorific and Order of the Red Banner. With 28th Army of the 1st Ukrainian Front on 1 May 1945, assigned 48th and 55th Guards and 20th Rifle Divisions. Disbanded summer 1945.

==== 21–30 Corps ====
- 21st Rifle Corps – Headquarters formed in the Moscow Military District in September 1939. Assigned to the WSMD with the 17th, 24th, and 37th Rifle Divisions. Disbanded summer 1945.
- 22nd Rifle Corps – Headquarters formed in the Baltic Special Military District in August 1940. With 180th and 182nd Rifle Divisions, part of 27th Army, BSMD Estonian Territorial Rifle Corps. Second formation 1943-summer 1945.
- 23rd Rifle Corps – in the Transcaucasus Military District comprising 136th Rifle Division and 138th Mountain Rifle Division under General Major K.F. Baranov. Disbanded in Berlin while with 3rd Combined Arms Army, 4 July 1956. (Feskov et al 2013, 133)
- 24th Rifle Corps – After the occupation of Latvia in June 1940 the annihilation of the Latvian Army began. The army was renamed the People's Army and in September–November 1940– the Red Army's 24th Territorial Rifle Corps. In September the corps contained 24,416 men but in autumn more than 800 officers and about 10,000 instructors and soldiers were discharged. The arresting of soldiers continued in the following months. In June 1940, the entire Territorial Corps was sent to Litene camp. Before leaving the camp, Latvians drafted in 1939 were demobilised, and replaced by about 4000 Russian soldiers from area around Moscow. On June 10, the corps senior officers were sent to Russia where they were arrested and most of them- shot. On June 14 at least 430 officers were arrested and sent to Gulag camps. After the German attack to Soviet Union, from June 29 to July 1 more 2080 Latvian soldiers were demobilsed, fearing that they might turn their weapons against the Russian commissars and officers. Simultaneously, many soldiers and officers deserted and when the corps crossed the Latvian border only about 3000 Latvian soldiers remained. On June 22, 1941 it comprised the 181st and 183rd Rifle Divisions, part of 27th Army, BSMD. Latvian Territorial Rifle Corps. It finished the war in 1945 in Germany as part of 13th Army – 117th Rifle Division, 380th Rifle Division, 395th Rifle Division.
- 25th Rifle Corps – Headquarters formed in the Kharkov Military District in September 1939. 127th, 134th and 162nd Rifle Divisions, part of 19th Army. Disbanded summer 1945. After the war, became 25th Army Corps on 25 June 1957 (Feskov et al 2013, 133)
- 26th Rifle Corps – Comprised the 21st, 22nd, and 26th Rifle Divisions, part of First Red Banner Army, Soviet Far East Front. After the war, part of 36th Army for a time, and stationed at Dauriya. Disbanded 18 April 1956.
- 27th Rifle Corps – Headquarters formed in the Kiev Special Military District in September 1939. Assigned to the 5th Army and composed of the 87th, 124th, and 135th Rifle Divisions.
- 28th Rifle Corps – Headquarters formed from the headquarters of the Reserve Group of the Northwestern Front in February 1940. Comprised the 6th, 42nd, 49th, and 75th Rifle Divisions as part of 4th Army. Disbanded summer 1945.
- 29th Rifle Corps – Headquarters formed in the Baltic Special Military District in August 1940. Assigned to the 11th Army in the Baltic Military District, including the 179th and 181st Rifle Divisions. Lithuanian Territorial Rifle Corps. Destroyed(?) September 1941 in the initial stages of Operation Barbarossa, and disbanded. 29th Rifle Corps (II), March–April 1943. Reformed on 25 June 1943 as the 29th Rifle Corps. Included 55th Rifle Division (IIIrd Formation), in September–October–November 1943 while part of 60th Army. Mid 1957 reorganised as 29th Army Corps. Mid 1969 disbanded by being upgraded and reorganised as 35th Army.
- 30th Rifle Corps – Headquarters formed in the Orel Military District in September 1939. In the Orel Military District, including the 19th, 149th and 217th Rifle Divisions. Reformed and assigned to 18th Army, 4th Ukrainian Front in 1944 in the Mukachevo – Uzhgorod area during Carpathian-Uzhgorod Offensive Operation (9 September 1944 – 28 September 1944) Disbanded summer 1945.

==== 31–40 Corps ====
- 31st Rifle Corps – composed of the 193rd, 195th, 200th Rifle Divisions, assigned to the Southwestern Front. Disbanded on 25 Sep 41. Reformed as part of 26th Army on 5 Feb 43, disbanded in 1952 in Murmansk to form the 6th Army
- 32nd Rifle Corps – Headquarters formed in the Transbaikal Military District in September 1939. 46th and 152nd Rifle Divisions, with 16th Army, STAVKA Reserve. With 5th Shock Army in January–February 1945, 3rd Belorussian Front. Briefly reformed at Yuzhno-Sakhalinsk in 1955 but disbanded in 1956. (Feskov et al 2013, 131, 580.)
- 33rd Rifle Corps – in the Orel Military District, including 89th, 120th, and 145th Rifle Divisions. Reformed from 119th Rifle Corps in June 1955; on 4 June 1957 renamed 33rd Army Corps. Moved from Dushanbe to Kemerovo (Siberian Military District) in 1968. Disbanded July 1991, with elements absorbed by the 28th Army Corps, which was arriving in Kemerovo from the Olomouc, Czechoslovakia (Central Group of Forces).
- 34th Rifle Corps – Headquarters formed in the Volga Military District in September 1939. 129th, 158th and 171st Rifle Divisions, part of 19th Army
- 35th Rifle Corps – Headquarters formed in the Kiev Special Military District in September 1939. 9th Army, Odessa Military District, comprising the 95th and 176th Rifle Divisions.
- 36th Rifle Corps – Headquarters formed in the Kiev Special Military District in September 1939. Composed of the 140th, 146th, and 228th Rifle Divisions Disbanded summer 1945, while with 31st Army. Comprised 62nd, 88th and 331st Rifle Division on 10 June 1945.
- 37th Rifle Corps – Headquarters formed in the Kiev Special Military District in September 1939. In the Kiev Special Military District, assigned to the 6th Army, including 80th, 139th, and 141st Rifle Divisions.
- 39th Rifle Corps – comprised the 32nd, 40th, and 92nd Rifle Divisions, part of 25th Army, Soviet Far East Front
- 40th Rifle Corps – Headquarters formed in the Transcaucasus Military District in March 1941. in the Transcaucasus Military District under General Major A. A. Khadeev with 9th Rifle Division and 31st Rifle Division.

==== 41–50 Corps ====
- 41st Rifle Corps – Headquarters formed in the Moscow Military District in March 1941. in the Moscow Military District included 118th and 235th Rifle Divisions
- 42nd Rifle Corps – Headquarters formed in the Leningrad Military District in March 1941. Assigned to the 14th Army, Leningrad Military District with the 104th and 22nd Rifle Divisions. First Formation 22 June 1941, disbanded 14 October 1941; was used to reinforce the Kandalksha operational group.
- 44th Rifle Corps – under HQ Western Special Military District, comprised the 64th and 108th Rifle Divisions under General Major Vasily Yushkevich.
- 45th Rifle Corps – with the 187th, 227th and 232nd Rifle Divisions, part of the Stavka Reserve.
- 47th Rifle Corps – under HQ Western Special Military District, comprised the 55th, 121st, and 143rd Rifle Divisions.
- 48th Rifle Corps – 9th Army, Odessa Military District, comprising the 30th Mountain Rifle and 74th Rifle Divisions.
- 49th Rifle Corps – composed of the 190th, 197th and 199th Rifle Divisions. On August 4, 1943, the corps, as a part of the 7th Guards Army, overcoming the enemy's stubborn resistance and deflecting frenzied counterattacks, persistently moved forward to Belgorod. Increasing the attack force, parts of the corps stormed the city and cleared it on August 5. On January 18, 1944, the units of the corps, as a part of 53rd Army, fought defensively in the Zvenigorodka–Vodyanoy area. By February 13, 1944, the corps, after being subordinated to the 5th Guards Tank Army, was transferred back to 53A along with their defensive position.
- 50th Rifle Corps – Assigned to the 23rd Army, Leningrad Military District with the 43rd, 70th and 123rd Rifle Divisions. Used to form 42nd Army in August 41. Reformed in May–June 1943 and initially assigned to 38th Army. Disbanded in June–July 1945.

==== 51–60 Corps ====
- 51st Rifle Corps, with 98th, 112th, and 153rd Rifle Divisions, part of the 22nd Army
- 52nd Rifle Corps, with its HQ in Novosibirsk, Siberian Military District along with the 133rd Rifle Division, additionally had the 166th Rifle Division at Barabinsk and the 178th Rifle Division at Omsk, part of 24th Army. Became 30th Army on 13 July 1941. Disbanded by Stavka VGK Order 11097 of 29.5.45, which established the Northern Group of Forces.
- 53rd Rifle Corps at Krasnoyarsk, Siberian Military District, where the 119th Rifle Division was stationed, also included the 107th Rifle Division at Barnaul and the 91st Rifle Division at Achinsk, part of 24th Army
- 54th Rifle Corps - Unable to stop the momentum of the 4th Panzer Army, Trofim Kolomiets was demoted in October 1942 to become commander of this corps. He participated in this position in operations on the Mious, Donbass, around Melitopol, Belarus and East Prussia.
- 55th Rifle Corps – composed of the 130th, 169th, and 189th Rifle Divisions
- 58th Rifle Corps – composed of the 68th, 83rd, and 194th Mountain Rifle Divisions in the Central Asia Military District. In February 1944, 68th Mountain Rifle Division, 75th Rifle Division, 89th Rifle Brigade, and 90th Rifle Brigade with 4th Army.
- 59th Rifle Corps – composed of the 39th and 59th Rifle Divisions, part of 1st Red Banner Army, Soviet Far East Front
- 60th Rifle Corps – Western Special Military District. 7th, 8th, and 214th Airborne Brigades. Became 4th Airborne Corps 23 June 1941.

==== 61–70 Corps ====
- 61st Rifle Corps – 110th, 144th, 172nd Rifle Divisions, 20th Army, Stavka Reserve
- 62nd Rifle Corps – 170th, 174th, 186th Rifle Divisions, with 22nd Army
- 63rd Rifle Corps – 53rd, 148th, 167th Rifle Divisions, with 21st Army. While at Chelyabinsk in the Urals Military District in the 1950s, disbanded by being redesignated 63rd Army Corps on 4 June 1957.
- 64th Rifle Corps – North Caucasus Military District with the 165th, and 175th Rifle Divisions. At the end of the war with 57th Army, comprised the 73rd Guards, 113th, and 299th Rifle Divisions.
- 65th Rifle Corps – Headquarters only assigned to the Baltic Special Military District. Active again in Dec 43 assigned to the 33rd Army.
- 66th Rifle Corps – 61st, 117th, 154th Rifle Divisions, with 21st Army
- 67th Rifle Corps – 102nd, 132nd, 151st Rifle Divisions, part of the STAVKA Reserve Disbanded by Stavka VGK Order 11097 of 29.5.45, which established the Northern Group of Forces.
- 69th Rifle Corps – 73rd, 229th, 233rd Rifle Divisions, 20th Army, Stavka Reserve. Active again in Apr 44 assigned to the 33rd Army

==== Named corps ====
- Special Rifle Corps – 79th Rifle Division and 101st Mountain Rifle Division, Far Eastern Front

=== World War II ===
Almost all Soviet Rifle Corps were disbanded in the first several months of the war and reformed as the Stavka gained experience in commanding large numbers of forces.

==== 1–70 Corps ====
- 38th Rifle Corps – first appears in Soviet Order of Battle (OOB) 1 June 1943, as part of the 50th Army, Western Front. Subordinate divisions at this date were the 17th, 326th, and 413th Rifle Divisions.
- 43rd Rifle Corps – first appears in Soviet OOB 1 June 1943, as part of the 2nd Shock Army, Leningrad Front. Subordinate divisions at this date were the 11th, 128th, and 314th Rifle Divisions. Disbanded. Reformed on 13 June 1955 by redesignation of 137th Rifle Corps. Became 43rd Army Corps on 25 June 1957 while at Petropavlovsk-Kamchatka, Kamchatskaya Oblast.
- 46th Rifle Corps – first appears in Soviet OOB 1 August 1943, as part of the 61st Army, Bryansk Front. Subordinate divisions at this time were the 356th and 415th Rifle Divisions.
- 54th Rifle Corps – first appears in Soviet OOB 1 June 1943, as part of the 51st Army, Southern Front. Subordinate divisions at this time were the 87th, 99th, and 302nd Rifle Divisions.
- 56th Rifle Corps – first appears in Soviet OOB 1 August 1943, as part of the 16th Army, Far Eastern Front. Subordinate divisions at this time were the 79th and 101st Rifle Divisions. Assignment of numeric designation to the Special Rifle Corps that disappears from the Soviet OOB on the same date.
- 57th Rifle Corps – first appears in Soviet OOB 1 September 1943, as part of the 37th Army, STAVKA Reserve. Subordinate divisions at this time were the 62nd Guards, 92nd Guards, 110th Guards, and 53rd Rifle Divisions. In early October 1943 the corps, forcing the Dnieper, seized and held a bridgehead on the west bank of the river. On 06.03.1944 elements of the corps, participating in the Odessa Offensive (part of the Dnieper–Carpathian Offensive), parts of the corps breached the German defenses on the western bank of the Inhulets River and moved forward. Having stormed the inhabited locality of Lozovatka and after slight regrouping, the corps began the pursuit of the enemy. On March 16, 1944, the corps deterred the counterattacks by the enemy, who was attempting to force back our units from the Ingul River and to hold the river crossings near Sofiyevka with 35–40 tanks and several infantry battalions. On March 22, the units of the corps reached the Southern Bug River. On the night of March 27, (two divisions of) the corps, having crossed the Southern Bug, moved forward under the enemy's heavy fire and captured the large inhabited locality of Akmechet. On April 1, 1944, parts of the corps, acting as a part of the 37th Army, captured the inhabited localities of Stryukovo, Shvartsevo, Korneyevka, and the Tiligul River crossing. On April 5, the divisions of the corps fought a battle for the station of Migayevo. On April 11, 1944, the corps, having been reinforced from the reserve with the 15th Guards Rifle Division and with the support of the 23rd Tank Corps, liberated Tiraspol, forced the Dniester River, and stormed into Varnitsa. Commander: Major General AI Petrakovskii (- 18/01/1944 ) Major General FA Ostashenko (01.19.1944 – military commissar, deputy political commissar Colonel IN Karasev Chief of Staff : V.I. Mineev. On 9 August 1945 the corps, now part of the Soviet Far East command, comprised 52nd and 203rd Rifle Divisions under General Major A.A. Dakonov.
- 68th Rifle Corps – first appears in Soviet OOB 1 August 1943, as part of the 57th Army, Southwestern Front. Subordinate divisions at this time were the 19th, 52nd, and 303rd Rifle Divisions.
- 70th Rifle Corps – first appears in Soviet OOB 1 August 1943, as a headquarters with no troops assigned and part of the Western Front.

==== 71–80 Corps ====
- 71st Rifle Corps – first appears in Soviet OOB 1 August 1943, as a headquarters with no troops assigned and as part of the 31st Army, Western Front.
- 72nd Rifle Corps – first appears in Soviet OOB 1 August 1943, as a headquarters with no troops assigned and part of the 68th Army, Western Front. Part of 5th Army, 3rd Belorussian Front, on 1 November 1944. Part of 5th Army, 1st Far East Front, on 3 September 1945, comprising 63rd, 215th, and 277th Rifle Divisions. (BSSA)
- 73rd Rifle Corps – first appears in Soviet OOB 1 August 1943, as a headquarters with no troops assigned and as part of the 52nd Army, STAVKA Reserve.
- 74th Rifle Corps – first appears in Soviet OOB 1 August 1943, as a headquarters with no troops assigned and as part of the Moscow Military District.
- 75th Rifle Corps – first appears in Soviet OOB 1 August 1943, as a headquarters with no troops assigned and as part of the Moscow Military District.
- 76th Rifle Corps – first appears in Soviet OOB 1 August 1943, as a headquarters with no troops assigned and as part of the Moscow Military District. In Transcaucasus Military District postwar, until it became the 31st Army Corps in 1955.
- 77th Rifle Corps – first appears in Soviet OOB 1 August 1943, as a headquarters with no troops assigned and as part of the Moscow Military District. In July 1945 in Germany, part of 47th Army, with the 185th, 260th, 328th Rifle Divisions.
- 78th Rifle Corps – first appears in Soviet OOB 1 August 1943, as a headquarters with no troops assigned and part of the Ural Military District.
- 79th Rifle Corps – first appears in Soviet OOB 1 August 1943, as a headquarters with no troops assigned and part of the Ural Military District. This corps commanded units that stormed the Reichstag on 2 May 1945. (150th, 171st, 207th Rifle Divisions on July 9, 1945, on formation of Group of Soviet Forces in Germany). Disbanded by being redesignated 2nd Rifle Corps in 1957 in Sakhalin.
- 80th Rifle Corps – first appears in Soviet OOB 1 August 1943, as a headquarters with no troops assigned and part of the Trans-Volga Military District.

==== 81–90 Corps ====
- 81st Rifle Corps – first appears in Soviet OOB 1 August 1943, as a headquarters with no troops assigned and part of the 68th Army, Western Front.
- 82nd Rifle Corps – existed until 13.6.55, when it was renamed 25th Rifle Corps, and 25.6.57 it was renamed 25th AK. Disbanded 6.60. HQ in Nikolayev with the 28th Guards Motor Rifle Division, 34th Gds MSD and 95th Motor Rifle Division in the late 1950s.
- 83rd Rifle Corps (119th, 339, 360th Rifle Divisions) as part of 4th Shock Army on 1 December 1944 (Combat Composition of the Soviet Army (BSSA))
- 84th Rifle Corps
- 85th Rifle Corps
- 86th Rifle Corps
- 87th Rifle Corps – see 33rd Motor Rifle Division#Service in the invasion of Manchuria. On 9 August 1945 comprised 342nd Rifle Division and 345th Rifle Division plus 914th Signals Battalion, 967th Engineer Battalion, plus an artillery regiment. Became 32nd Rifle Corps 1955 and disbanded under that number in 1956. (Feskov et al 2013, 131, 580).
- 88th Rifle Corps – Hunchun, August 1945
- 89th Rifle Corps
- 90th Rifle Corps – finished war with 43rd Army, comprising 26th Rifle Division, 70th Rifle Division, and 319th Rifle Division. Corps headquarters, as well as 70th and 319th RDs were disbanded in August–September 1946.

==== 91–100 Corps ====
- 91st Rifle Corps
- 92nd Rifle Corps
- 93rd Rifle Corps
- 94th Rifle Corps (124th, 221st, 358th Rifle Divisions) and 113th Rifle Corps (192, 262, 338th Rifle Divisions) with 39th Army, RVGK on 1 May 1945),
- 95th Rifle Corps – disbanded by Stavka VGK Order 11097 of 29.5.45, which established the Northern Group of Forces.
- 96th Rifle Corps
- 97th Rifle Corps – first appears in Soviet OOB 1 November 1943, as a headquarters with no troops assigned and part of the Moscow Military District.
- 98th Rifle Corps – first appears in Soviet OOB 1 November 1943, as a headquarters with no troops assigned and part of the Moscow Military District. Disbanded by Stavka VGK Order 11097 of 29.5.45, which established the Northern Group of Forces.
- 99th Rifle Corps – first appears in Soviet OOB 1 November 1943, as a headquarters with no troops assigned and part of the Moscow Military District. Later part of 14th Army, and 19th Army.
- 100th Rifle Corps – first appears in Soviet OOB 1 November 1943, as a headquarters with no troops assigned and part of the Moscow Military District.

==== 101–110 Corps ====
- 101st Rifle Corps – first appears in Soviet OOB 1 September 1943, as a headquarters with no troops assigned and part of the Trans-Volga Military District.
- 102nd Rifle Corps – first appears in Soviet OOB 1 November 1943, as a headquarters with no troops assigned and part of the Trans-Volga Military District.
- 103rd Rifle Corps – first appears in Soviet OOB 1 November 1943, as a headquarters with no troops assigned and part of the Volga Military District. Disbanded by Stavka VGK Order 11097 of 29.5.45, which established the Northern Group of Forces.
- 104th Rifle Corps – first appears in Soviet OOB 1 November 1943, as a headquarters with no troops assigned and part of the North Caucasus Military District. Included 58th Mountain Rifle Division. In June–July 1945 V.I. Feskov et al 2013 lists the corps, as part of 57th Army, Southern Group of Forces, it comprised the 21st, 74th, 93rd, and 151st Rifle Divisions. By November 1945 the 21st Rifle Division had become the 20th Mechanised Division, and the 151st Rifle Division had either been disbanded or transferred elsewhere. The corps appears to have disbanded on 11 June 1946.
- 105th Rifle Corps – first appears in Soviet OOB 1 November 1943, as a headquarters with no troops assigned and part of the North Caucasus Military District. The 193rd Rifle Division was joined with the 354th Rifle Division in April to form the 105th Rifle Corps, commanded by General D. F. Alekseev, where it would remain for the duration of the war.
- 106th Rifle Corps – first appears in Soviet OOB 1 November 1943, as a headquarters with no troops assigned and part of the North Caucasus Military District. 100th and 306th Rifle Divisions during the battle for Lvov in July 1944. Disbanded by Stavka VGK Order 11097 of 29.5.45, which established the Northern Group of Forces.
- 107th Rifle Corps
- 108th Rifle Corps – 372nd Rifle Division assigned to this corps from 1 September 1944 to 1 May 1945.
- 109th Rifle Corps – on 9 July 1945 on the formation of the Group of Soviet Forces in Germany, this corps with 46th, 90th, 372nd Rifle Divisions) was part of 2nd Shock Army.
- 110th Rifle Corps

==== 111–120 Corps ====
- 111th Rifle Corps
- 112th Rifle Corps
- 113th Rifle Corps
- 114th Rifle Corps
- 115th Rifle Corps
- 116th Rifle Corps – on 9 July 1945 with the formation of the Group of Soviet Forces in Germany, this corps with 86th, 321st, 326th Rifle Division was part of 2nd Shock Army.
- 117th Rifle Corps
- 118th Rifle Corps
- 119th Rifle Corps – Formed 25 January 1944 from forces assigned to the 8th Army. Holm 2015 gives the formation date as 16 December 1943. Soon after the war it arrived at Dushanbe in the Turkestan Military District with the 201st, 360th, and 374th Rifle Divisions. It appears that quickly, on 30 October 1945, the 374th Rifle Division was redesignated the 306th Rifle Division. On 13 June 1955 it was redesignated 33rd Rifle Corps.
- 120th Rifle Corps – Headquarters formed during December 1943 in the Moscow Military District. With 3rd Guards Army of the 1st Ukrainian Front on 1 May 1945, assigned the 106th, 197th, and 329th Rifle Divisions. Awarded the Order of Suvorov. Disbanded during the northern hemisphere summer of 1945.

==== 121–130 Corps ====
- 121st Rifle Corps – Headquarters formed during December 1943 in the reserve of the Belorussian Front. With 49th Army of the 2nd Belorussian Front on 1 May 1945, assigned the 42nd, 191st, and 199th Rifle Divisions. Disbanded during the northern hemisphere summer of 1945.
- 122nd Rifle Corps – Headquarters formed during December 1943 with the 2nd Shock Army of the Leningrad Front. With 42nd Army of the Courland Group of Forces of the Leningrad Front on 1 May 1945, assigned the 56th and 85th Rifle Divisions. Disbanded in March 1946.
- 123rd Rifle Corps – in Summer 1945, the 123rd Rifle Corps arrived in the Ural Military District and its headquarters was established at Kuibyshev. It comprised the 29th, 43rd, and 376th Rifle Divisions. They were established at Shikhany (Saratov Oblast), Kuibyshev, and Serdobsk. In 1946–53 they were reduced into the 10th, 21st, and 48th Rifle Brigades, and the 48th may have been disbanded in 1947. In 1953 the 63rd Mechanised Division was formed on the basis of the 29th Rifle Division at Shikhan. In 1955 the 123rd Rifle Corps became the 40th Rifle Corps, and in May 1957 the 40th Army Corps. That year the 43rd Rifle Division became the 43rd Motor Rifle Division, and the 63rd Mechanised Division the 110th Motor Rifle Division. In November 1964 the 110th was redesigned the 29th Motor Rifle Division. In 1968 the 29th MRD was moved to Kamen-Rybolov, Primorskiy Krai, in the Far East Military District. The 40th Army Corps was active until at least 1962, and Feskov et al 2013 lists its commanders until October 1960 (p. 508).
- 124th Rifle Corps – Headquarters began forming during December 1943 with the Moscow Military District. With 50th Army of the 2nd Belorussian Front on 1 May 1945, assigned the 51st, 208th, and 216th Rifle Divisions. Disbanded in December 1945.
- 125th Rifle Corps – in July 1945 in Germany, part of 47th Army, with 60th, 76th, 175th Rifle Divisions.
- 126th Light Rifle Corps - Arctic, 14th Army
- 127th Light Rifle Corps - Arctic, 14th Army
- 128th Rifle Corps – Headquarters formed during April 1944 with the Moscow Military District. With 28th Army of the 1st Ukrainian Front on 1 May 1945, assigned the 61st, 130th, and 152nd Rifle Divisions. Awarded Gumbinnen honorific. Stationed in the Belorussian Military District postwar with the 28th Army and renumbered as the 42nd Rifle Corps in 1954.
- 129th Rifle Corps – in July 1945, in Germany, part of 47th Army, with 82nd, 132nd, 143rd Rifle Divisions.
- 130th Latvian Rifle Corps of the Order of Suvorov. This Red Army national formation was formed on June 5, 1944, shortly before the Red Army attacked Latvia. Their strength was about 15,000 men, which consisted three divisions – 43rd Guards, and 308th Latvian Rifle Division and a Soviet division. The corps commander was Major General Detlavs Brantkalns, Staff headquarters head Major General P. Baumanis, Corps rear commander was Regiment Commander E. Blekis. The Latvian Rifle Corps (2nd Baltic Front) fought in Latvia at Rēzekne and Daugavpils, Madona, Krustpils and Riga Offensive (1944) and combat at Courland Pocket. During the Courland battles it was subordinate to 2nd Baltic Front 22nd and later 42nd Army. The Corps units fought against Latvian Legion 19th SS Division units.

==== 131–140 Corps ====
- 132nd Rifle Corps – formed part of 19th Army
- 133rd Rifle Corps – may have disbanded at Stanislav (Ivano-Frankovsk) in September 1945, along with its 104th and 122nd Rifle Divisions.
- 134th Rifle Corps – formed part of 19th Army. Disbanded by Stavka VGK Order 11097 of 29.5.45, which established the Northern Group of Forces.
- 135th Rifle Corps
- 136th Rifle Corps
- 137th Rifle Corps – established 5 December 1945 at Petropavlovsk-Kamchatka, Kamchatskaya Oblast. See also . On 13 June 1955 redesignated 43rd Rifle Corps.

=== Guards Rifle Corps ===
1st–40th Guards Rifle Corps formed after June 22, 1941:

==== 1–10 Guards Rifle Corps ====
- 1st Guards Special Rifle Corps – was formed in late 1941
- 1st Guards Rifle Corps
- 2nd Guards Rifle Corps – still active in the Baltic Military District in 1955 (Feskov et al.).
- 3rd Guards Rifle Corps
- 4th Guards Rifle Corps – in September 1943 included 38th Guards Rifle Division, 263rd RD, 267th Rifle Division, part of 6th Army, Southwestern Front. From November 1943 commanded by G.E. Afanas'evich, former commander of the Soviet Airborne Forces (3rd Ukrainian Front). From 8th Guards Army, the corps headquarters was relocated to Estonia, with 48th Rifle Division and 36th Guards Mechanised Division from the disbanded 10th Guards Army. On 30 March 1948 10th Guards Army was renamed 4th Guards Rifle Corps. On 25 June 1957 renamed 4th Guards Army Corps. Disbanded May 1960.
- 5th Guards Rifle Corps – (17th Guards Rifle Division, 19th Guards Rifle Division and 91st Guards Rifle Divisions), 1 May 1945 with 39th Army. Same three divisions with 39th Army at Port Arthur in the early 1950s.
- 6th Guards Rifle Corps
- 7th Guards Rifle Corps Kovenskiy Red Banner – seemingly reformed in March 1955 in the Far East from the 72nd Rifle Corps, active since the war ended with the 63rd, 215th and 277th Rifle Divisions.
- 8th Guards Rifle Corps – With 11th Guards Army, headquarters in Polotsk, after the end of the war. In June 1946 became 8th Guards Red Banner Neman Airborne Corps, supervising the 7th, 103rd, and 114th Guards Airborne Divisions based in Belarus. The corps along with the 114th Guards Airborne Division was disbanded in 1956.
- 9th Guards Rifle Corps – Formed in June 1942 in the Kaluga region on the basis of the 12th Guards Rifle Division. Spent entire war as part of the 61st Army. Took part in the Orel offensive after Kursk, Chernigov-Priyat, and Gomel-Rechitsa Offensive. Still active in the Belorussian Military District in 1955. Merged with 20th Rifle Corps after the end of the war?
- 10th Guards Budapest Rifle Corps – Took part in liberation of Odessa alongside 37th Rifle Corps, as part of 5th Shock Army, 3rd Ukrainian Front. At Battle of Debrecen. Circa 1956, 10th Guards 'Budapest' Rifle Corps formerly part of the Odessa Military District with headquarters at Kishinev, became 14th Guards Army.

==== 11–20 Guards Rifle Corps ====
- 11th Guards Rifle Corps – still active in the Voronezh Military District in 1955.
- 12th Guards Rifle Corps –
- 13th Guards Rifle Corps – became 13th Guards Army Corps postwar, stationed in Moscow Military District. Disbanded by being redesignated 22nd Army 1990–91.
- 14th Guards Rifle Corps
- 15th Guards Rifle Corps – finished the war as part of 10th Guards Army.
- 16th Guards Rifle Corps – finished the war as part of 11th Guards Army, incorporating the 1st Guards Rifle Division, 11th Guards Rifle Division, and 31st Guards Rifle Division on 1 May 1945.
- 17th Guards Rifle Corps
- 18th Guards Rifle Corps – Formed April 1943. 18th Guards Red Banner Stanislavsky-Budapest. General Lieutenant Ivan Afonin took command of the corps in February 1943. Assigned to armies including the 13th, 60th, 1st Guards, 38th Army, 18th, 46th, and 53rd Armies. After the war with Japan the Corps was transferred from Transbaikal to the Siberian Military District (Omsk). Later included the 109th Guards, 67th and 95th MRD (former 109th Guards, 56th and 198th RD) and 411 Guards Corps artillery regiment. Presumably in 1960, it was reorganised as Headquarters 49th Guards Rocket Division, Strategic Rocket Forces.
- 19th Guards Rifle Corps – finished the war as part of 10th Guards Army.
- 20th Guards Rifle Corps

==== 21–30 Guards Rifle Corps ====
- 21st Guards Rifle Corps
- 22nd Guards Rifle Corps
- 23rd Guards Rifle Corps – as of 1 April 45 included 51st Guards Rifle Division and 67th Guards Rifle Division in 42nd Army, but was not part of the 42nd Army by 1 MAy 1945.:
- 24th Guards Rifle Corps – spent much of the war associated with 53rd Army. Commander N.А. Васильев. Disbanded while part of 14 Army, Odessa Military District, Bolgrad, 15 November 1956. (Feskov et al 2013, 133)
- 25th Guards Rifle Corps
- 26th Guards Rifle Corps – Formed 24 April 1943 from 30th Rifle Corps (II), commanded by Pavel Firsov. Fought in Battle of the Dnieper in October 1943 with the 46th Army. Fought in Second Jassy–Kishinev Offensive and Battle of Berlin with 5th Shock Army.
- 27th Guards Rifle Corps – May 1945 under 7th Guards Army, Central Group of Forces. Headquarters at Nagykanizsa, Hungary, until December 1945. Thereafter transferred to Konotop, Sumskaya Oblast, Ukraine. In October 1953 the corps' three independent rifle brigades were expanded into divisions: the 7th independent Guards into the 64th Guards Mechanised Division at Belaya Tserkov, the 9th independent Guards into the 81st Guards Rifle Division at Hlukhiv, and the 12th independent Guards into the 112th Guards Rifle Division at Desna, Kozelets Raion. In July 1954 the 64th Guards Mechanised Division was redesignated the 14th Guards Tank Division and transferred directly to Kiev Military District control. Renamed as an Army Corps in August 1957 and disbanded in August 1958.
- 28th Guards Rifle Corps – originally formed as 15th Rifle Corps (second formation). See brief sketch history in Bonn 2005.
- 29th Guards Rifle Corps – Originally formed 19 February 1943 as the 19th Rifle Corps (II) as part of 1st Guards Army. Became 29th Guards Rifle Corps 16 April 1943. Transferred to 8th Guards Army in May 1943. Fought in Donbass Strategic Offensive (August 1943), Battle of the Dnieper, Dnieper–Carpathian Offensive, Lublin–Brest Offensive, Vistula–Oder Offensive, East Pomeranian Offensive, Berlin Offensive. Honorific Łódź for capture of Łódź February 1945, awarded Order of the Red Banner for Berlin Offensive.
- 30th Guards Red Banner Leningrad Rifle Corps – became 30th Guards Army Corps after World War II, and based at Vyborg in the Leningrad Military District for many years until 1998.

==== 31–41 Guards Rifle Corps ====
- 31st Guards Rifle Corps – part of 4th Guards Army
- 32nd Guards Rifle Corps – part of 5th Guards Army, fought in Berlin Offensive
- 33rd Guards Rifle Corps – part of 5th Guards Army
- 34th Guards Rifle Corps – formed 25 April 1943 from 18th Rifle Corps (III), part of 5th Guards Army since July 1944, fought in Sandomierz–Silesian Offensive, Prague Offensive
- 35th Guards Rifle Corps – Although it never fought in the vicinity of Prokhorovka, the 35th Guard Rifle Corps confronted the supportive actions of the III Panzer Corps on the right flank of II SS Panzer Corps during the Battle of Prokhorovka (precisely, during Operation Roland).
- 36th Guards Rifle Corps – Neman Red Banner. At least until the end of the 1950s the corps was part of the 11th Guards Army, including the 1st Guards Motor Rifle Division and 5th MRDs and the 30th Mechanised Division (unclear as to whether the two last-mentioned were Guards divisions.)
- 37th Guards Rifle Corps – later 37th Guards Airborne Corps, fought in Vyborg–Petrozavodsk Offensive, Vienna Offensive and Prague Offensive; honorific "Svir"
- 38th Guards Rifle Corps – later 38th Guards Airborne Corps, honorific "Vienna", fought in Vienna & Prague Offensives
- 39th Guards Rifle Corps – later 39th Guards Airborne Corps, honorific "Vienna", fought in Vienna & Prague Offensives
- 40th Guards Rifle Corps – on 9 July 1945 in Germany, this corps was part of 2nd Shock Army.
- 41st Guards Rifle Corps – Estonian Tallinn. Formed 1945 from 8th Estonian Rifle Corps

== See also ==
- Cavalry corps (Soviet Union)
- Mechanised corps (Soviet Union)
- Tank corps (Soviet Union)

== Sources ==
- Dvoinykh, L.V.; Kariaeva, T.F.; Stegantsev, M.V., eds. (1993). Центральный государственный архив Советской армии [Central State Archive of the Soviet Army] (in Russian). Vol. 2. Minneapolis: Eastview Publications. ISBN 1879944030.
- V.I. Feskov, et al. The Soviet Army in the Years of the Cold War: 1945–91, Tomsk: Tomsk University Publishing House, 2004.
- Feskov, V.I.; Golikov, V.I.; Kalashnikov, K.A.; Slugin, S.A. (2013). Вооруженные силы СССР после Второй Мировой войны: от Красной Армии к Советской [The Armed Forces of the USSR after World War II: From the Red Army to the Soviet: Part 1 Land Forces] (in Russian). Tomsk: Scientific and Technical Literature Publishing. ISBN 9785895035306.
- David M. Glantz, Stumbling Colossus, Lawrence: University Press of Kansas, 1998. ISBN 0-7006-0879-6.
- David M. Glantz and Jonathan House, When Titans Clashed, Lawrence: University Press of Kansas, 1995. ISBN 0-7006-0899-0.
- Glantz, David M. (2010). Barbarossa Derailed: The German Advance to Smolensk, the Encirclement Battle, and the First and Second Soviet Counteroffensives, 10 July – 24 August 1941. Philadelphia: Casemate. ISBN 9781906033729.
- Gurkin, V.V.; Malanin, K.A. (1963). Боевой состав Советской армии: Часть I (июнь-декабрь 1941 года) [Combat Composition of the Soviet Army, Part I (June–December 1941)] (PDF) (in Russian). Moscow: Military Historical Department of the Military Scientific Directorate of the General Staff.
- Gurkin, V.V.; et al. (1966). Боевой состав Советской армии: Часть II (Январь-декабрь 1942 года) [Combat Composition of the Soviet Army, Part II (January–December 1942)] (PDF) (in Russian). Moscow: Voenizdat.
- Gurkin, V.V.; et al. (1972). Боевой состав Советской армии: Часть III (Январь — декабрь 1943 г.) [Combat Composition of the Soviet Army, Part III (January–December 1943)] (PDF) (in Russian). Moscow: Voenizdat.
- Gurkin, V.V.; et al. (1988). Боевой состав Советской армии: Часть IV (Январь — декабрь 1944 г.) [Combat Composition of the Soviet Army, Part IV (January–December 1944)] (PDF) (in Russian). Moscow: Voenizdat.
- Gurkin, V.V.; et al. (1990). Боевой состав Советской армии: Часть V (Январь—сентябрь 1945 г.) [Combat Composition of the Soviet Army, Part V (January–September 1945)] (PDF) (in Russian). Moscow: Voenizdat.
- Kirillin, A.V.; et al. (2005). Перечни наименований объединений, соединений и других формирований Вооруженных Сил, народного ополчения, гражданских ведомств СССР и иностранных формирований, участвовавших в Великой Отечественной и советско-японской войнах 1941-1945 гг. : справочник [List of names of units and formations of the Armed Forces, People's Militia, civilian formations of the Soviet Union, and foreign units that fought in the Great Patriotic War and Soviet–Japanese War 1941–1945: Directory] (in Russian). Moscow: Military Memorial Centre of the Russian Armed Forces.
- Main Personnel Directorate of the Ministry of Defense of the Soviet Union (1964). Командование корпусного и дивизионного звена советских вооруженных сил периода Великой Отечественной войны 1941–1945 гг [Commanders of Corps and Divisions in the Great Patriotic War, 1941–1945] (in Russian). Moscow: Frunze Military Academy.
- Meltyukhov, Mikhail (2008). Упущенный шанс Сталина. Схватка за Европу: 1939-1941 гг [Stalin's Missed Chance: The Struggle for Europe, 1939–1941] (in Russian). Moscow: Veche. ISBN 978-5-9533-2697-1.
- Robert G. Poirier and Albert Z. Conner, The Red Army Order of Battle in the Great Patriotic War, Novato: Presidio Press, 1985. ISBN 0-89141-237-9.
- Pokrovsky, A. P. (1956). "Перечень № 4. Управлений корпусов, входивших в состав действующей армии в годы Великой Отечественной войны 1941—1945 гг" [List (Perechen) No. 4: Corps headquarters, part of the active army during the Great Patriotic War 1941–1945] (in Russian). Moscow: Ministry of Defense of the Soviet Union.
- Vozhakin, M.G., ed. (2006). Великая Отечественная. Комкоры. Военный биографический словарь [The Great Patriotic War: Corps Commanders: Military Biographical Dictionary] (in Russian). Vol. 1. Moscow: Kuchkovo Pole. ISBN 5901679083.
