= 209th Rifle Division =

209th Motorized Division (March 1941 - September 19, 1941) 209th Rifle Division (October 8, 1941 - 1946)
- Active: 1941–1946
- Country: Soviet Union
- Branch: Red Army
- Type: Infantry
- Role: Motorized Infantry
- Size: Division
- Engagements: Operation Barbarossa; Battle of Białystok–Minsk; Soviet invasion of Manchuria
- Battle honours: Khingan

Commanders
- Notable commanders: Col. Aleksei Ilich Muravyov; Col. Ivan Terentevich Chalenko; Maj. Gen. Vladimir Mikhailovich Akimov; Lt. Col. Vasilii Stepanovich Elikhov; Col. Vladimir Aleksandrovich Dubovik

The 209th Rifle Division was formed as an infantry division of the Red Army after a motorized division of that same number was destroyed in the first weeks of the German invasion of the Soviet Union. It served through nearly the remainder of the war on a quiet sector in Transbaikal Front, mostly as part of 36th Army. During July 1945, in the leadup to the Soviet invasion of Manchuria, it was transferred to 17th Army, still in Transbaikal Front. This Army was in the second echelon of the invading forces and saw very little, if any, actual combat, but the division was nevertheless given a battle honor. It had been disbanded by mid-1946.

== 209th Motorized Division ==
The division began forming in March 1941 as part of the prewar buildup of Soviet mechanized forces in the Western Special Military District as part of the 17th Mechanized Corps. Based on the 13th Motorized Machine-gun – Artillery Brigade at Iwye, it was still located there on June 22. Once formed its order of battle was as follows:

- 754th Motorized Rifle Regiment
- 770th Motorized Rifle Regiment
- 129th Tank Regiment
- 675th Artillery Regiment
- 34th Antitank Battalion
- 195th Antiaircraft Battalion
- 278th Reconnaissance Battalion
- 398th Light Engineering Battalion
- 594th Signal Battalion
- 207th Artillery Park Battalion
- 385th Medical/Sanitation Battalion
- 698th Motor Transport Battalion
- 119th Repair and Restoration Battalion
- 44th Regulatory Company
- 474th Chemical Defense (Anti-gas) Company
- 310th Field Postal Station
- 381st Field Office of the State Bank

Col. Aleksei Ilich Muravyov was appointed to command on March 11. While the division's artillery regiment was at full strength and its rifle regiments had most of their heavy weapons, the 129th did not have a single tank or armored car; in common with most of the other motorized divisions it only had a small fraction of its authorized motor vehicles and was therefore "motorized" in name only. The 17th Mechanized Corps was effectively a cadre formation and had only 36 tanks between its 27th and 36th Tank Divisions. At the start of the German invasion the Western District was redesignated as Western Front and the Corps, which also contained the 22nd Motorcycle Regiment, was under direct command of the Front and located well to the rear, but soon began moving west toward Baranavichy.

Beginning on June 26 the 209th took part in defensive battles along with its Corps near Baranavichy, Stowbtsy and Minsk. On June 25 or 26 Colonel Muravyov went missing in action and is believed to have been mortally wounded, possibly by a German saboteur, in the area of Mir. His deputy commander, Col. Ivan Terentevich Chalenko, took over the division and led it until it was disbanded. On July 5 the division, along with the other remnants of 17th Mechanized Corps, was assigned to 21st Army but as of July 10 was back under direct command of Western Front. During this period elements of the division managed to escape encirclement around Minsk, crossing the Berezina and later the Dniepr near Smolensk, but these were more refugees than fighting forces. While it is still included in the Red Army order of battle of August 1 under Western Front command it disappears a month later and was officially disbanded on September 19. Colonel Chalenko would be promoted to the rank of major general in March 1943 and would command several cavalry divisions well into the postwar era before his retirement in August 1953.

== Formation ==
The 209th Rifle Division began forming on October 8, 1941 in the reserves of Transbaikal Front, based on local resources and the shtat (table of organization and equipment) of July 29, 1941, and by December it had come under command of 36th Army in that Front, joining its "sister", the 210th Rifle Division. When it completed forming its order of battle was as follows:

- 579th Rifle Regiment
- 754th Rifle Regiment
- 770th Rifle Regiment
- 675th Artillery Regiment
- 492nd Self-propelled Artillery Battalion (added in 1945)
- 34th Antitank Battalion
- 278th Reconnaissance Company
- 398th Sapper Battalion
- 597th Signal Battalion (later 320th Signal Company)
- 385th Medical/Sanitation Battalion
- 197th Chemical Defense (Anti-gas) Company
- 517th Motor Transport Company
- 359th Field Bakery
- 836th Divisional Veterinary Hospital
- 1490th Field Postal Station
- 1490th Field Office of the State Bank

Col. Vladimir Mikhailovich Akimov was assigned to command on the day the division began forming and held the post until February 24, 1942 when he was replaced by Lt. Col. Vasilii Stepanovich Elikhov. Akimov returned to command of the 35th Reserve Rifle Brigade that he had led prior to the 209th and was promoted to the rank of major general on December 20 before taking over the division again on January 24, 1943. Through this entire period it remained on this inactive front in 36th Army, which as of the beginning of the new year also contained the 94th and 210th Rifle Divisions, the 126th Rifle Brigade and the 31st Fortified Region. At the start of 1944 the situation was essentially unchanged although the Army had added the 278th and 298th Rifle Divisions and an operational rifle corps headquarters numbered the 86th.

General Akimov was appointed to command of 86th Rifle Corps on April 4 and was replaced in command of the 209th by Col. Vladimir Aleksandrovich Dubovik, who would remain in this post for the duration of the war. In May all five rifle divisions of 36th Army came under command of this Corps, but a month later it went back to operational status and the divisions returned to being under direct Army command. At the beginning of 1945 the Corps had the 94th and 298th Divisions under command but the 209th, 210th and 278th were still separate divisions.

=== Soviet invasion of Manchuria ===
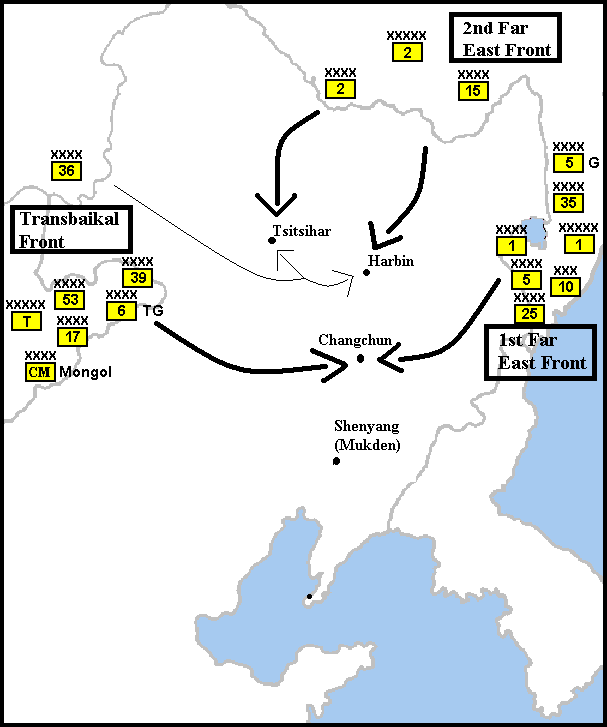
Invasion of Manchuria. Note location of 17th Army.

At the time of the surrender of Germany 36th Army was still in the same configuration, but preparations for war against Japan were being made. The 492nd Self-propelled Artillery Battalion of 12 SU-76s was added to the 209th to provide fully-tracked mobile firepower given the difficult and mostly roadless terrain to be found in Manchuria. In July the division was transferred to 17th Army, still in Transbaikal Front, joining the 278th and 284th Rifle Divisions. When the Manchurian operation began the 17th Army was in a secondary role on the western flank of the invading forces and saw very little combat before the Japanese capitulation on August 20.

=== Postwar ===
Following the campaign, in common with many other formations of the Front, the 209th was awarded the honorific "Khingan" for its success in crossing the Greater Khingan mountain range. By October 1 it had come under command of the 85th Rifle Corps, still in 17th Army. It was disbanded along with this Army in the spring and summer of 1946.
