= 210th Rifle Division =

210th Motorized Division (March 1941 - July 14, 1941) 210th Rifle Division (October 8, 1941–1946)
- Active: 1941–1946
- Country: Soviet Union
- Branch: Red Army
- Type: Infantry
- Role: Motorized Infantry
- Size: Division
- Engagements: Operation Barbarossa; Battle of Białystok–Minsk; Battle of Smolensk (1941); Soviet invasion of Manchuria
- Battle honours: Khingan

Commanders
- Notable commanders: Kombrig Feofan Agopovich Parkhomenko; Col. Vasilii Afanasevich Burmasov; Col. Nikolai Ivanovich Banyuk

The 210th Rifle Division was formed as an infantry division of the Red Army after a motorized division of that same number was badly damaged and then redesignated as a cavalry division in the first weeks of the German invasion of the Soviet Union. It served through nearly the remainder of the war on a quiet sector in Transbaikal Front, entirely as part of 36th Army. During July 1945, in the leadup to the Soviet invasion of Manchuria, it was transferred to the 86th Rifle Corps, still in 36th Army. This Army was in the second echelon of the invading forces and saw very little, if any, actual combat, but the division was nevertheless given a battle honor. It was transferred to 17th Army and was disbanded with it by mid-1946.

== 210th Motorized Division ==
The division began forming in March 1941 as part of the prewar buildup of Soviet mechanized forces in the Western Special Military District as part of the 20th Mechanized Corps. Based on the 4th Cavalry Division at Asipovichy, it was still located there on June 22. Once formed its order of battle was as follows:

- 644th Motorized Rifle Regiment
- 649th Motorized Rifle Regiment
- 130th Tank Regiment
- 678th Artillery Regiment
- 35th Antitank Battalion
- 199th Antiaircraft Battalion
- 285th Reconnaissance Battalion
- 385th Light Engineering Battalion
- 580th Signal Battalion
- 208th Artillery Park Battalion
- 365th Medical/Sanitation Battalion
- 680th Motor Transport Battalion
- 123rd Repair and Restoration Battalion
- 42nd Regulatory Company
- 480th Chemical Defense (Anti-gas) Company
- 62nd Field Postal Station
- 381st Field Office of the State Bank

Kombrig Feofan Agopovich Parkhomenko was appointed to command on March 11. As indicated by his obsolete rank he had been arrested late during the Great Purge in October 1938 before being released in December 1939. He had served as deputy commander of the 4th Cavalry for a year before taking command of the 210th. The division's artillery regiment had only one battalion of 76mm guns and no howitzers and its rifle regiments were short over 25 percent of their authorized personnel on June 22. The 130th did not have a single tank or armored car; in common with most of the other motorized divisions it only had a small fraction of its authorized motor vehicles and was therefore "motorized" in name only.

At the start of the German invasion the Western District was redesignated as Western Front and the Corps, which also contained the 24th Motorcycle Regiment, was under direct command of the Front and located well to the rear, but soon began moving west toward Baranavichy which it did not reach until June 28. By July 1 the Soviet general staff was listing it as "without equipment", meaning it had lost virtually all its transport and heavy weapons. The last division strength report, on July 7, listed just 5,000 personnel and nine guns.

=== Defense of Mogilev ===
The scattered elements of 20th Mechanized Corps had been assigned to 13th Army by the beginning of July, still in Western Front, and were falling back to the Dniepr River in the vicinity of Mogilev. This city was being threatened by the advance of the German XXIV Motorized Corps and was being held by the remnants of eight to ten divisions. On July 11, before Mogilev was encircled, the STAVKA ordered that the 210th, as a formation that still contained a good number of trained cavalry, be moved to Bryansk to be reformed as the 4th Cavalry Division. During the night of July 13 it took part in a successful attack against the Großdeutschland Regiment as it departed the area.

== Formation ==
The 210th Rifle Division began forming on October 8, 1941 in the 36th Army of Transbaikal Front, based on local resources and the shtat (table of organization and equipment) of July 29, 1941, and by December its "sister", the 209th Rifle Division, had joined it under 36th Army command. When it completed forming its order of battle was as follows:

- 582nd Rifle Regiment
- 644th Rifle Regiment
- 649th Rifle Regiment
- 653rd Artillery Regiment
- 493rd Self-propelled Artillery Battalion (added in 1945)
- 40th Antitank Battalion
- 285th Reconnaissance Company
- 385th Sapper Battalion
- 580th Signal Battalion (later 325th Signal Company)
- 365th Medical/Sanitation Battalion
- 198th Chemical Defense (Anti-gas) Company
- 518th Motor Transport Company
- 837th Divisional Veterinary Hospital
- 360th Field Bakery
- 925th Field Postal Station (later 1491st)
- 1491st Field Office of the State Bank

Col. Vasilii Afanasevich Burmasov was assigned to command on the day the division began forming; he had previously served in staff positions in the 57th Motor Rifle Division. On this inactive front as of the beginning of the new year the Army also contained the 94th and 210th Rifle Divisions, the 126th Rifle Brigade and the 31st Fortified Region. At the start of 1944 the situation was essentially unchanged although the Army had added the 278th and 298th Rifle Divisions and an operational rifle corps headquarters numbered the 86th.

Colonel Burmasov was appointed to deputy command of 86th Rifle Corps on May 26 and was replaced in command of the 210th by Col. Nikolai Ivanovich Banyuk, who would remain in this post for the duration of the war. In May all five rifle divisions of 36th Army came under command of this Corps, but a month later it went back to operational status and the divisions returned to being under direct Army command. At the beginning of 1945 the Corps had the 94th and 298th Divisions under command but the 209th, 210th and 278th were still separate divisions.

=== Soviet invasion of Manchuria ===
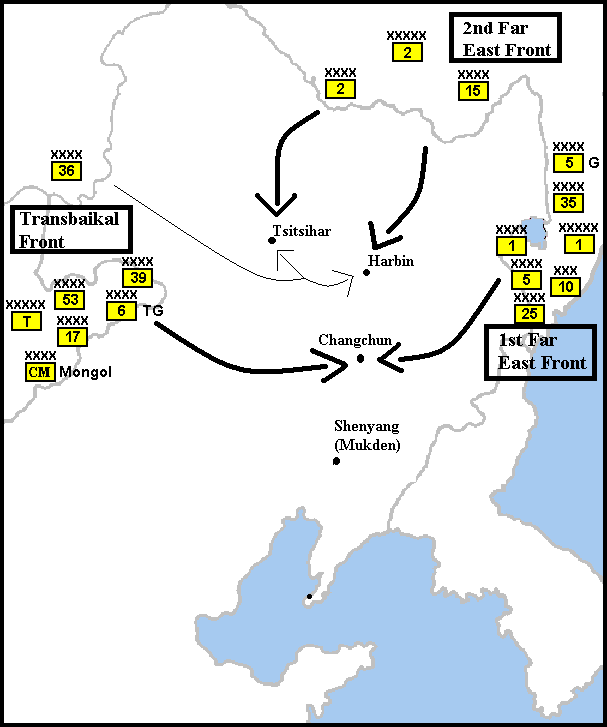
Invasion of Manchuria. Note location of 36th Army.

At the time of the surrender of Germany 36th Army was still in the same configuration, but preparations for war against Japan were being made. The 493rd Self-propelled Artillery Battalion of 12 SU-76s was added to the 210th to provide fully-tracked mobile firepower given the difficult and mostly roadless terrain to be found in Manchuria. In July the division returned to 86th Corps, still in 36th Army, joining the 94th Division. When the Manchurian operation began the 36th Army was in a secondary role on the western flank of the invading forces and saw very little combat before the Japanese capitulation on August 20.

=== Postwar ===
Following the campaign, in common with many other formations of the Front, the 210th was awarded the honorific "Khingan" for its success in crossing the Greater Khingan mountain range. By October 1 it was still in 86th Corps, but shortly after it was transferred to 17th Army, rejoining its "sister" 209th. It was disbanded along with this Army in the spring and summer of 1946.
