= 292nd Division =

292nd Division may refer to:

- 292nd Infantry Division, Wehrmacht, Germany
- 292nd Rifle Division, Soviet Union

== See also ==
- List of military divisions by number
