= 355th Rifle Division =

Soviet Army unit in WWII

355th Rifle Division (August 1941 – July 21, 1942) (December 10, 1944–1948)
- Active: 1st formation: August 1941–July 1942; 2nd formation: December 1944–1948
- Country: Soviet Union
- Branch: Red Army
- Type: Division
- Role: Infantry
- Engagements: Battles of Rzhev; Operation Seydlitz; Soviet invasion of Manchuria; Invasion of the Kuril Islands; Proposed Soviet invasion of Hokkaido

Commanders
- Notable commanders: Col. Andrei Yegarovich Khodunovich; Kombrig Afanasii Nikolaievich Ryzhkov; Col. Grigorii Mikhailovich Mirsonov; Col. Sergei Grigorevich Abakumov

The 355th Rifle Division (Russian: 355-я стрелковая дивизия) was a standard Red Army rifle division of World War II, formed twice.

The division's first formation began forming in August 1941 in the Kirov Oblast. During the winter counteroffensive in the Moscow region it was committed to the Toropets salient in January 1942, and fought as part of Kalinin Front's efforts from the west to encircle and destroy much of German Army Group Center in the Rzhev salient. In the event this proved unsuccessful, and during the spring and early summer these Soviet forces were first contained, and then encircled and destroyed, and the division was officially disbanded due to excessive losses.

After an absence of nearly two and a half years from the Red Army order of battle, a new 355th was formed near the end of 1944 in the far east of the USSR, where it served for the duration of the war. During the Soviet invasion of Manchuria it captured the Korean city of Chongjin by amphibious assault, but this was not sufficient to win any distinctions, leaving the division with one of the shortest and least distinguished service records of any Soviet unit.

== 1st Formation ==
The first formation of the division began in August 1941 in the Ural Military District. Its primary order of battle was as follows:

- 1182nd Rifle Regiment
- 1184th Rifle Regiment
- 1186th Rifle Regiment
- 922nd Artillery Regiment

Colonel Andrei Yegarovich Khodunovich was not assigned to command of the division until October 1, a remarkably long time after the unit began forming. At the end of November, the division was assigned to 39th Army, which was also just in the process of forming-up in the Reserve of the Supreme High Command, in the Ural region. One month later, the division and its Army moved to join Kalinin Front, and when the 355th first went into combat in early January 1942, it had around 10,000 men assigned and was rated as "full strength for shtat (order of battle)". On January 14, Khodunovich was replaced by Afanasii Nikolaievich Ryzhkov, who still carried the obsolete rank of Kombrig; Ryzhkov would remain in command for the rest of the first formation's existence.

During this period, the armies of Kalinin Front were deeply outflanking Army Group Center from the north, carving out the Toropets salient to the north and west of German 9th Army's positions in the Rzhev salient. During the rest of the winter, the 39th Army was tasked with driving westwards to encircle and destroy these enemy forces in conjunction with Western Front attacking from the east. In the event, difficult terrain and supply shortages, plus desperate German resistance, frustrated this plan. On February 5, most of 29th Army was separated from the 39th Army to its southwest and encircled; few of these men escaped. In May, the 355th was moved to 22nd Army, but it was as badly placed as the 39th, stalled and surrounded on three sides in the area of Belyi. On July 2 German forces launched Operation Seydlitz to finally liquidate this threat to their rear. On July 6 the corridor from Kalinin Front to its besieged armies was cut at the village of Pushkari, north of Belyi, which encircled the division along with several others. Over the following weeks individuals, small groups, and even some formed and armed subunits managed to make their way through the encirclement lines, but despite this 22nd Army reported 1,433 killed, 3,279 wounded, and 3,905 missing in action in the month of July. The 355th took a large share of these losses, and was the only division of 22nd Army to actually be disbanded, which occurred officially on July 21.

== 2nd Formation ==
It was not until December 10, 1944, that a new 355th Rifle Division was formed, this time in 2nd Red Banner Army of the Far Eastern Front. The new 355th's order of battle differed from that of the first formation, and included the 387th, 442nd, and 484th Rifle Regiments, supported by the 83rd Artillery Regiment. Colonel Grigorii Mikhailovich Mirsonov was appointed to command on the same date, only to be replaced by Colonel Sergei Grigorevich Abbakumov on April 10, 1945. As of June 1 the division was still in the 2nd Army but in July it was transferred to the Chuguevsk Operational Group, directly subordinated to the Maritime Group of Forces, which later became the 1st Far Eastern Front, along with the 335th Rifle Division and two Fortified Regions. During the Soviet invasion of Manchuria the division carried out a successful amphibious assault on the port city of Chongjin, Korea, on August 13. Only light resistance was encountered, and on August 16, after an overland advance the 393rd Rifle Division reached the city, bringing active operations in Korea to an end.

At 08:30 on 22 August, after being transferred to the 87th Rifle Corps, the division embarked aboard convoy VKMA-1 at Vladivostok, arriving at Maoka in South Sakhalin at 16:00 on 25 August. It took part, alongside the corps, in mopping up operations in South Sakhalin. The corps' deployment to Sakhalin was a result of a planned invasion of Hokkaido, which was cancelled due to movement delays, Japanese resistance on Sakhalin, and "political considerations". From Maoka it force marched to Otomari, where it embarked for the Kuriles. In early September the division landed two rifle regiments and its artillery regiment (less one battalion) on Etorofu (renamed Iturup under Soviet control), and one rifle regiment and an artillery battalion on Urup.

== Postwar ==
The 355th ended the war without any battle honors or unit decorations. In November 1945, Abbakumov was relieved of command of the division for "failure to control subordinates" during the South Sakhalin and Kurile operations. It was stationed at Iturup with the Far Eastern Military District's 85th Rifle Corps by 1 July 1946, and was redesignated as the 7th Machine-Gun Artillery Division in 1948.
