= 52nd Rifle Division (Soviet Union, 1942–1946) =

- Active: 2nd formation: 1942–1946; 3rd formation: 1955–1957
- Country: Russian Soviet Federative Socialist Republic; Soviet Union
- Branch: Red Army / Soviet Army
- Type: Infantry
- Size: Division
- Engagements: World War II; East Prussian Offensive; Battle of Berlin

The 52nd Rifle Division was an infantry division of the Red Army during World War II and the Cold War.

== Formation ==
A new 52nd Rifle Division formed on Mar. 1, 1942 at Kolomna in the Moscow Military District.

The division was completed in about three months. It arrived at the front in late July 1942, as part of 30th Army, in Kalinin Front, just in time to participate in the First Rzhev–Sychyovka Offensive Operation. The 52nd, along with the rest of 30th Army, was transferred to Western Front in August. The division was quickly worn down in these battles of attrition very near the town of Rzhev but, along with the 2nd and 16th Guards Rifle Divisions, was able to liberate the key village of Polunino and advance 6 km to the outskirts of the town during the following months.

After rebuilding, on the last day of 1942 the 52nd began moving south to Southwestern Front. It took part in the Soviet offensive towards Kharkov in early 1943, serving at various times in the 1st Guards Army, the Popov Mobile Group, and the 3rd Tank Army. This effort did not go well for the division, as it was assaulted and partially overrun by German forces. By the end of the winter the 52nd was in 57th Army, the former 3rd Tank Army, where it remained with few exceptions until the end of 1944. From March to July the division was dug in along the line of the Donets River.

In August 1943, the division moved with 57th Army to Steppe Front, coming under command of Col. A.Ia. Maksimov on Aug. 12. From the end of September to Oct. 26 it was in reserves, at Merefa near Kharkov, an indication of how much damage it had suffered in the pursuit of German forces after the Battle of Kursk, during which time it assisted in the liberation of Kharkov and Krasnograd. At the end of November it joined 64th Rifle Corps.

The 52nd entered and helped expand the Soviet Kremenchug-Dnepropetrovsk bridgehead across the Dnepr River before digging in along the Ingulets River for the winter. Along with its 57th Army, the division was moved to 3rd Ukrainian Front in February 1944, and took part in the successful early stages of the spring offensive to the Dniestr River, before being halted in the First Jassy–Kishinev Offensive. In August a new offensive was launched, and the 52nd played a role in the destruction of the German and Romanian forces in this southern sector. After the capture of Belgrade on Oct. 20, due to losses the division again went into reserves in the town of Ruma, rebuilding to a strength of 6,000 men by the end of December. The division was awarded the Order of the Red Banner in recognition of its "courage and valor" in the capture of Belgrade on 14 November.

In January 1945, 52nd was transferred to 4th Guards Army, and later that same month to 46th Army, which was shifted to 2nd Ukrainian Front in March. In April the division was given part of the credit for the capture of Vienna and got that city's name as an honorific. On 1 May 1945 the division was with 18th Guards Rifle Corps, 53rd Army, in 2nd Ukrainian Front, alongside 109th Guards Rifle Division and 317th Rifle Division. It ended the war with Germany fighting near Prague.

Along with its Army, the division was railed across Siberia to take part in the Soviet invasion of Manchuria. On 9 August 1945 the 52nd Rifle Division was with 57th Rifle Corps, in the 53rd Army, Transbaikal Front. It saw little combat with Japanese forces and ended the war in southern Manchuria. It carried the official title of 52nd Rifle, Shumlinskaya-Vienna, Twice Order of the Red Banner, Order of Suvorov Division. (Russian: 52-я стрелковая Шумлинская-Венская дважды Краснознамённая ордена Суворова дивизия)

After the war, the division relocated with the 66th Rifle Corps to the Odessa Military District at Haivoron. It became the 43rd Rifle Brigade there and disbanded in December 1946.

== Third Formation ==
In 1955, it was reformed from the 315th Rifle Division at Kerch, part of the Tauric Military District. It became the 52nd Motor Rifle Division on 17 May 1957.
