= 91st Rifle Division =

- Active: First Formation: 1939–1941; Second Formation: 1941–1953
- Country: Soviet Union
- Branch: Red Army (to 1946); Soviet Army (after 1946)
- Engagements: World War II; First Formation: Winter War; Battle of Moscow; Second Formation: Battle of Stalingrad; Crimean Offensive
- Decorations: Order of the Red Banner (2nd Formation)
- Battle honours: Melitopol (2nd Formation)

The 91st Rifle Division was an infantry division of the Red Army and Soviet Army, formed twice. The division was first formed in 1939, fought in the Winter War, and was destroyed in the Vyazma Pocket during the Battle of Moscow. It was reformed in December 1941 and fought in the Battle of Stalingrad and the Crimean Offensive, earning the honorific "Melitopol" and the Order of the Red Banner. The division was downsized into a brigade postwar but became a division again in 1953. It became a motor rifle division in 1957.

== First Formation ==
The 91st Rifle Division was formed in Achinsk by 1 December 1939 in the Siberian Military District from elements of the 94th Rifle Division as part of the 52nd Rifle Corps, under the command of Colonel Nikita Lebedenko. The division became a motor rifle division on 5 January 1940. The division fought in the closing stages of the Winter War and returned to Achinsk in April 1940, when it became a rifle division again. On 26 June 1941, after the German invasion of the Soviet Union four days earlier, the 91st Rifle Division began loading onto trains. On 29 June it left Achinsk. Between 8 and 10 July the trains arrived in Yelnya and Sychyovka. The division and its corps, which also included the 119th Rifle Division, joined the 24th Army.

The 91st Rifle Division was active with 52nd Rifle Corps (24th Army) in June 1941, and then transferred to 19th Army, Western Front before being destroyed at Vyazma. The Soviet defense, still under construction, was overrun and spearheads of the 2nd and Third Panzer Groups met at Vyazma on 10 October 1941. Four Soviet armies (the 19th, 20th, the 24th, and 32nd) were trapped in a huge pocket just west of the city. It was formally disbanded in December 1941.

== Second Formation ==
On 5 December 1941 the 464th Rifle Division was formed in Dagestan in the North Caucasus Military District, near the cities of Makhachkala and Bataysk. On 27 January 1942 the division was redesignated the 91st Rifle Division (Second Formation) in the North Caucasus Military District. On 19 November 1942, the division was fighting in the Battle of Stalingrad, part of the 51st Army of the Stalingrad Front under General N.I. Trufinov. On 1 April 1944, the division was part of the 1st Guards Rifle Corps of 51st Army and appears to have become involved in the Battle of the Crimea.

In August 1945, the 91st Rifle Division (Military Unit Number 34562) moved to the Kazan Military District at Sarapul with the 10th Rifle Corps. In 1946, it became the 14th Rifle Brigade, after being transferred to the Ural Military District as a result of the disbandment of the Kazan Military District. In October 1953, the brigade became the 91st Rifle Division again. On 4 June 1957, the division became the 91st Motor Rifle Division after relocating to Perm. In 1959 it was disbanded.

In 1960 the newly formed 8th Rocket Division was given the division's awards and honors.
