= 54th Guards Rifle Division =

- Active: 1942–1946
- Country: Soviet Union
- Branch: Red Army
- Type: Division
- Role: Infantry
- Engagements: Operation Ring; Operation Gallop; Donbas Strategic Offensive (August 1943); Lower Dnieper Offensive; Lvov–Sandomierz Offensive; Prague Offensive
- Decorations: Order of Lenin; Order of the Red Banner; Order of Suvorov; Order of Kutuzov
- Battle honours: Makeevka

The 54th Guards Rifle Division was an infantry division of the Red Army during World War II.

The division was created on December 16, 1942, from the second formation of the 119th Rifle Division. It was assigned the honorific title of "Guards" in recognition of that division's leading role in Operation Uranus, the breakthrough that led to the encirclement of the German/Romanian forces in Stalingrad, and the subsequent elimination of the 3rd Romanian Army. The 54th Guards Division continued a record of distinguished service through the rest of World War II.

== History ==
The 54th Guards was one of the first of many Guards rifle divisions created from the divisions that fought in the Battle of Stalingrad. When formed, its order of battle was as follows:

- 160th Guards Rifle Regiment from the 365th Rifle Regiment
- 162nd Guards Rifle Regiment from the 421st Rifle Regiment
- 163rd Guards Rifle Regiment from the 634th Rifle Regiment
- 125th Guards Artillery Regiment from the 349th Artillery Regiment
- Guards Sapper Battalion from the 224th Sapper Battalion.

At the time of its formation the division it was serving in the 5th Tank Army of the Don Front. Later in the Stalingrad campaign it was transferred to various armies of the Southwestern Front. In February 1943 it was in the 18th Rifle Corps of the 3rd Guards Army and in the spring was reassigned to the 3rd Guards Rifle Corps, where it remained for the duration.

The 54th Guards Division, along this its corps, was soon reassigned to the Southern Front (renamed 4th Ukrainian Front on October 20, 1943) and served there for the next 12 months, mostly as part of the 5th Shock Army. It campaigned through the Donbas, southern Ukraine, and finally across the Dnepr River in October 1943. During that time, the division was credited with the liberation of the town of Makeevka in eastern Ukraine, and was given its name as an honorific. After the advance ground to a halt along the Dniester River in the spring of 1944, the division was withdrawn into the Stavka Reserve, and after rebuilding was reassigned to the 28th Army of the 1st Ukrainian Front. During this rebuilding, the division became one of the first rifle divisions to have its towed anti-tank gun battalion replaced with a battalion of SU-76 self-propelled guns.

With its Army, the 54th Guards drove into central Poland in the summer, and in early 1945 moved into Latvia to help mop up the German forces there. Following this, the 28th Army was shifted back across Poland, to join the 1st Ukrainian Front's offensive into Czechoslovakia in early May. The division ended the war near Prague. By this time the division had the following honorifics: Makeevka, Order of Lenin, Order of the Red Banner, Order of Suvorov, Order of Kutuzov).

After World War II, the division was relocated to Belarus with the 3rd Guards Rifle Corps at Kobryn. In the spring of 1946 the division and its corps were transferred to the 3rd Army, and disbanded within the next six months.

== Sources ==
- Feskov, V.I.; Golikov, V.I.; Kalashnikov, K.A.; Slugin, S.A. (2013). Вооруженные силы СССР после Второй Мировой войны: от Красной Армии к Советской. Часть 1: Сухопутные войска [The Armed Forces of the USSR after World War II: From the Red Army to the Soviet. Part 1: Land Forces] (in Russian). Tomsk: Scientific and Technical Literature Publishing. ISBN 978-5-89503-530-6.
