= 119th Rifle Division =

119th Motorized Rifle Division (August 19, 1939 – April 17, 1940) 119th Rifle Division (April 17, 1940 – March 17, 1942) 119th Rifle Division (April 21, 1942 – December 16, 1942) 119th Rifle Division (April 19, 1943 - 1946)
- Active: 1939–1946
- Country: Soviet Union
- Branch: Red Army
- Type: Infantry
- Size: Division
- Engagements: Winter War; Operation Barbarossa; Operation Typhoon; Battle of Moscow; Battles of Rzhev; Operation Blue; Battle of Stalingrad; Operation Uranus; Battle of Smolensk (1943); Battle of Nevel (1943); Polotsk–Vitebsk Offensive; Operation Bagration; Baltic Offensive; Riga Offensive (1944); Courland Pocket
- Decorations: Order of Suvorov (3rd Formation)

Commanders
- Notable commanders: Maj. Gen. Aleksandr Dmitrievich Berezin; Col. Ivan Yakovlevich Kulagin; Col. Ivan Dmitrievich Panov; Maj. Gen. Yosif Ivanovich Khorun; Col. Ivan Mikhailovich Toropchin; Col. Mikhail Lavrentevich Dudarenko

The 119th Rifle Division was an infantry division of the Red Army, formed three times. It was first formed in the Siberian Military District Krasnoyarsk in 1939 as a motorized rifle division until the following year when it was reorganized as a standard Red Army rifle division, based on the shtat (table of organization and equipment) of September 1939. It saw very limited service in the Winter War against Finland. At the time of the German invasion in 1941 it was part of 24th Army and began moving toward the front by rail. This movement continued until late July and after reaching Western Front it was eventually assigned to 31st Army of Reserve Front in August. With the launch of the German Operation Typhoon, the division was involved in a number of confused movements and heavy fighting west of Rzhev in the first week of October. It was reassigned to 29th Army as it evaded encirclement and retreated toward Kalinin, joining the Front of that name, and then returning to the 31st by the start of November. It was under this command through the winter counteroffensive, driving deep behind the northern flank of German 9th Army and helping to form the Rzhev salient. It was under 22nd Army in March 1942 when it was redesignated as the 17th Guards Rifle Division.

A new 119th was formed in April 1942 in the Moscow Military District, based on a rifle brigade. Once formed it joined the 3rd Tank Army in the Reserve of the Supreme High Command before moving to 5th Tank Army it August, seeing limited action in Bryansk Front. It was soon moved south toward Stalingrad, joining Southwestern Front, and attacked from the Serafimovich bridgehead across the Don River at the outset of Operation Uranus. I assisted in breaking through and encircling elements of Romanian 3rd Army before advancing south with 5th Tanks. In the three-week battle along the Chir River the 119th was involved in a see-saw struggle for the town of Surovikino, finally taking the place in mid-December. For this victory and its other successes in the campaign it was redesignated as the 54th Guards Rifle Division.

The division was formed for a third time in early 1943, again based on a rifle brigade in the Moscow Military District. It saw its first combat in the campaign to liberate Smolensk as part of Western Front's 21st Army, before moving north to join 4th Shock Army in 1st Baltic Front. and served for the duration of the war in the north-central sectors of the front. It played an important role in the surprise victory at Nevel in October before taking part in the attritional fighting north of Vitebsk through the winter. During the summer of 1944 the 119th took part in the offensives that drove German forces out of the Baltic states and won a decoration for the liberation of Riga in October. For most of the rest of the war it was involved in the containment of Army Group North in Courland, coming under several Army commands in 2nd Baltic Front and ending under 22nd Army in the Reserve of the Supreme High Command. The division was moved to the Odessa Military District soon after the end of the war, and was disbanded in the next few months.

== 1st Formation ==
The division was first organized at Krasnoyarsk in the Siberian Military District on August 19, 1939, as a motor rifle division, as part of the pre-war expansion of the Red Army. It carried the name "Krasnoyarsk" as an honorific for the duration of this formation. Kombrig Aleksandr Dmitrievich Berezin took command on the day it formed. This officer had previously led the 94th Rifle Division, would have his rank modernized to major general on June 5, 1940, and would lead the 119th for the duration of its 1st formation. It was moved to the Finnish front from January to March 1940, but only its artillery took part in the fighting. After returning to the Siberian Military District it was reorganized as a regular rifle division in April. As of June 22, 1941, it comprised:

- 365th Rifle Regiment (until October 6, 1941)
- 421st Rifle Regiment
- 634th Rifle Regiment
- 349th Light Artillery Regiment
- 510th Howitzer Artillery Regiment (until September 21, 1941)
- 216th Antitank Battalion
- 75th Antiaircraft Battery (later 257th Antiaircraft Battalion)
- 143rd Reconnaissance Company
- 224th Sapper Battalion
- 151st Signal Battalion
- 137th Medical/Sanitation Battalion
- 129th Chemical Defense (Anti-gas) Company
- 155th Motor Transport Battalion
- 143rd Field Bakery (later 491st)
- 1006th Divisional Veterinary Hospital
- 493rd Field Postal Station (later 1609th)
- 360th Field Office of the State Bank (later 1654th)

At the outset of Operation Barbarossa the division was in 52nd Rifle Corps of 24th Army, along with 91st and 166th Rifle Divisions. By July 10 it was detached from both Corps and Army, replaced by the 133rd Rifle Division, and was directly under the STAVKA Reserve, as it was still en route from Siberia. As it arrived west of Moscow it was assigned to the newly formed 30th Army, under command of Maj. Gen. V. A. Khomenko. Apart from the 119th his divisions were formed on cadres of NKVD troops fleshed out with reservists, and on August 5 he informed Western Front about the difficulties he was encountering in his mobilization due to numerous and constantly changing assembly orders, including the fact that the 119th was soon removed from his Army.

The division was moved to 31st Army in the new Reserve Front on August 14, 1941. The Army, with its headquarters at Rzhev, was assigned a sector south from the Moscow Sea. Unlike the newer divisions being formed at that time, the 119th had the pre-war organization and as of September 20 was actually over strength, with 1,142 officers, 14,804 NCOs and men, 13 tankettes, four armored cars, 166 heavy machine guns, 408 light machine guns, 54 45mm antitank guns, 85 artillery pieces, 109 mortars and four antiaircraft guns.

== Operation Typhoon ==
On October 1 the military council of 31st Army reported on the general condition of the defenses of the Rzhev–Vyazma line. This extended for 265-270km, at its strongest from Ostashkov to Valutino. Altogether 1,277 fortifications had been built, of which 317 were occupied by troops at the time; in general each rifle regiment had one battalion deployed to the first echelon. The depth of the defense was no more than 4-6km, and at least two more divisions were required. The 119th was attempting to cover 55km, which was one of the shorter sectors. The report noted ominously that German forces could easily occupy the empty bunkers and pillboxes in the event of an offensive, which had already begun to the south the previous day.

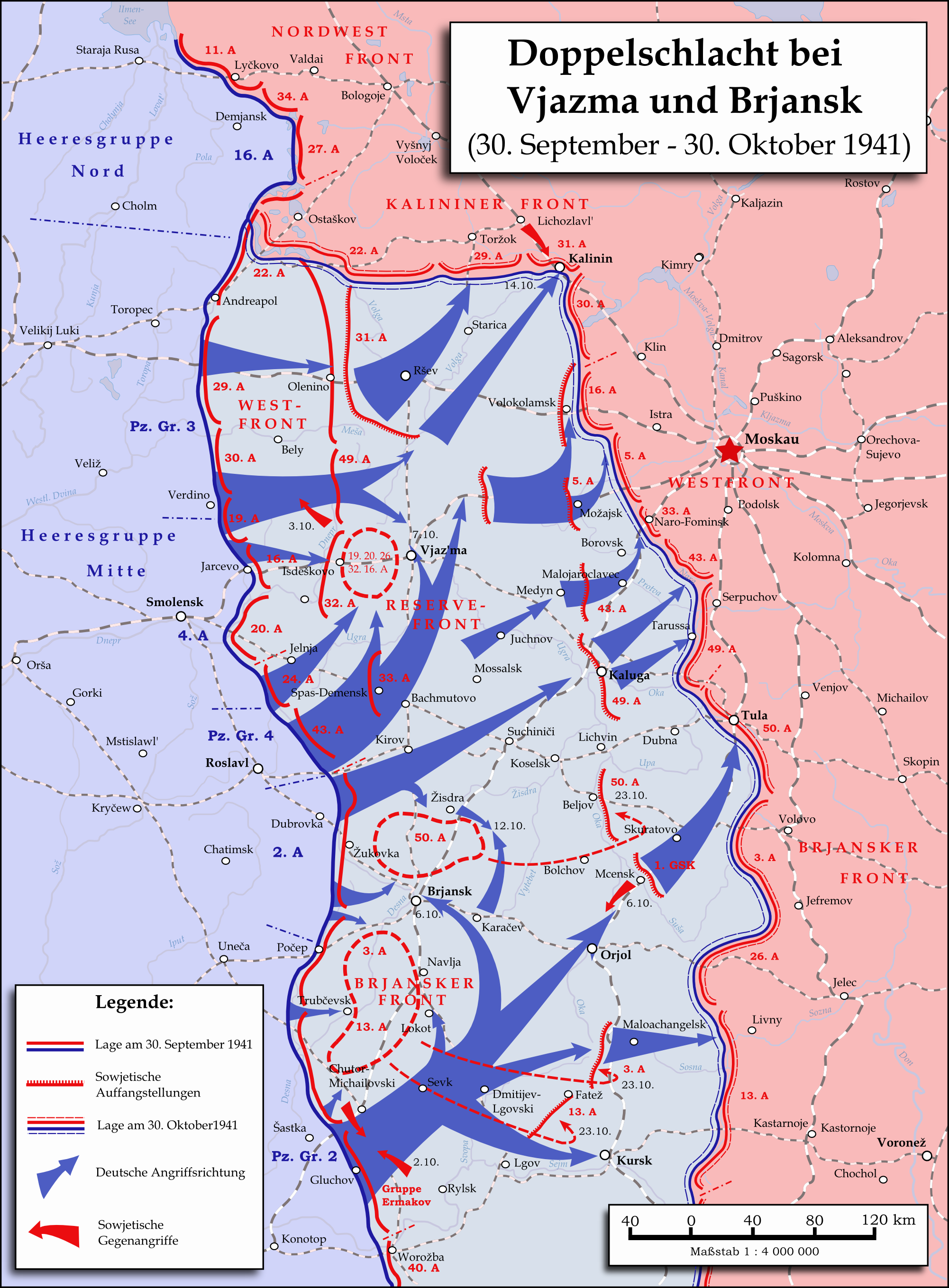
Operation Typhoon. Note positions of Reserve Front.

The southern grouping of Army Group Center (2nd Panzer Group, 2nd Army) launched their attack on September 30, while its main forces (3rd and 4th Panzer Groups, 4th and 9th Armies) began their part in the offensive on October 2, and broke through the Soviet front in several places within hours. In a prearranged move, the seven divisions of 49th Army were already preparing to entrain in the Rzhev area in response to the southern attack, unaware that the main blow would be coming two days later. The 110th Rifle Division was moving toward the rail lines, away from the 247th Rifle Division's sector, which left the boundary with the 119th, headquartered at Stepankovo, only partly covered. On October 5 the headquarters of Reserve Front reported to the STAVKA that:

5. The 5th Rifle Division... and the 119th Rifle Division from the 31st Army, the latter relieved by units of the 247th Rifle Division, are being sent to the Gzhatsk are instead of the Vskhody area for operating against Iukhnov or Viaz'ma and Ugra, according to the situation.

The report also emphasized that the Front could not hold against the offensive with its own resources.

For this move Berezin only had wheeled transport for his personnel, plus the regimental guns and antitank guns. The 349th Artillery Regiment and the divisional rear services would have to move by rail, with loading beginning at 1600 hours. German air attacks disrupted this plan, with the railroad itself soon cut by ground troops, forcing a change to the plan. 31st Army was now transferred to Western Front, and was to defend a line running to Pena. On October 6 the 365th Rifle Regiment was transferred to the 18th Rifle Division, which had escaped from encirclement with significant casualties. In exchange the 119th received the 920th Rifle Regiment from the 247th, one of the units made up from a cadre of NKVD troops. The plan of withdrawal was to begin overnight on October 6/7 in order to reach the defense line two days later, at which time the 119th and 247th would be transferred to 29th Army on a line from Eraevo to Khmelevka to Olenino Station. In the event, by October 9 the 119th was still preparing to move by vehicle to the Gzhatsk area. On the afternoon of October 11 the XXXXI Motorized Corps was advancing with difficulty toward Staritsa and Kalinin. At this point the new commander of the Front, Army Gen. G. K. Zhukov, decided to pull back the 29th Army to the line of the Volga as far as Zubtsov, requiring the divisions to cover up to 70km per day.

On October 19 Kalinin Front was formed, with 29th Army under its command, but by the end of the month the 119th was back in a very small 31st Army. By late November, even after this heavy fighting, the division still had a strength of 7,200 men, higher than average for Kalinin and Western Fronts at this time.

The men and women of the division fought well during the rest of the Battle of Moscow, and in the following counteroffensive. Beginning on January 8, 1942, 31st Army took part in the Sychevka-Vyasma Offensive Operation, which was planned "to encircle, and then capture or destroy the enemy's entire Mozhaisk - Gzhatsk - Vyasma grouping", that is, what later became known as the Rzhev salient. The 119th was one of the spearheads of this thrust behind the German lines, reaching the area near Bely by mid-January. During that month it was transferred to 22nd Army, also in Kalinin Front, and was still under this command on March 17 when it was recognized for its achievements in the counteroffensive by being redesignated as the 17th Guards Rifle Division.

== 2nd Formation ==
A new 119th Rifle Division was formed on April 21, 1942, in the Kalinin Oblast of the Moscow Military District, based on the 51st Rifle Brigade.

=== 51st Rifle Brigade ===
This brigade began forming in October 1941, from military students and training units in the Volga Military District. It was moved west in December and was assigned to the reserves of Northwestern Front. It was then moved to the 4th Shock Army, and it was one of the second echelon units of that army when the Toropets-Kholm Offensive began on January 9, 1942. Through the rest of the winter the brigade fought in 4th Shock, deep in the Toropets salient behind the German-held Rzhev salient, until it was pulled out in April and sent back to Kalinin.

== Battle of Stalingrad ==
The new division's order of battle remained similar to that of the first formation:

- 365th Rifle Regiment
- 421st Rifle Regiment
- 634th Rifle Regiment
- 349th Artillery Regiment
- 216th Antitank Battalion
- 237th Antiaircraft Battery
- 143rd Reconnaissance Company
- 224th Sapper Battalion
- 151st Signal Battalion
- 137th Medical/Sanitation Battalion
- 129th Chemical Defense (Anti-gas) Company
- 104th Motor Transport Company
- 491st Field Bakery
- 1006th Divisional Veterinary Hospital
- 868th Field Postal Station (later 493rd)
- 360th Field Office of the State Bank (later 1122nd)

Col. Ivan Yakovlevich Kulagin was appointed to command on the day the division formed. The 51st Brigade was a well-experienced unit so the new division needed only about three months to form up and train. It remained in the Moscow defenses until July when it was moved south to join 3rd Tank Army in the Reserve of the Supreme High Command. On August 30, still in reserve, it was reassigned to 5th Tank Army, fighting in Bryansk Front during the autumn.

During October, the 5th Tank Army was moved to Southwestern Front, under the command of Lt. Gen. N. F. Vatutin. At this time the 119th was noted as having 50 percent Russian personnel, with the remaining half being primarily Ukrainian and Asian. On November 19, the opening day of Operation Uranus, the division was deep within the Red Army's Serafimovich bridgehead across the Don River, at the village of Kalmykovskii, facing the Romanian 14th Infantry Division. At 0730 hours, 3,500 guns, mortars and rocket launchers opened an 80-minute preparation along the penetration sectors of Southwestern and Don Fronts. Before this was completed, forward elements of the 119th, supported by sappers, pushed to within 200-300m of the forward edge of the Romanian defenses. Before the artillery was finished, the infantry assault began.

=== Operation Uranus ===
Together the four rifle divisions in the bridgehead were backed by 138 tanks. On the 119th's left the 50th Guards and its supporting armor tore a gaping hole in the defenses on the left flank of Romanian 5th Infantry Division by 1100 hours; this leveraged the 119th's thrust due south, with all three rifle regiments in the first echelon, smashing the enemy's first defensive positions and approaching the village of Blinovskii by the same hour. This was an advance of 2-3km, less than anticipated in the offensive plan. By noon the division had helped to crack open the lines held by Romanian II Army Corps sufficiently to create an opening for the armor of 5th Tank to exploit. 1st Tank Corps deployed its three tank brigades in a line and at 1400 hrs. began advancing through the 119th and the adjacent 154th Rifle Division, (which was redesignated as the 47th Guards Rifle Division the next day.) in an attack that obliterated the remaining defenses of the Romanian 14th Infantry; the surviving Romanian troops caught "tank fright" and were routed. Later in the afternoon, the 634th Rifle Regiment cooperated with roughly 45 vehicles of 26th Tank Corps' 157th Tank Brigade to destroy the Romanian 14th's remaining strongpoint at Klinovoi, after which the armor continued to advance up to 22km against light resistance. The remainder of the division made slower progress.

On November 20, Colonel Kulagin left command of the division; he would take command of the 35th Guards Rifle Division a few weeks later. He was replaced the following day by Col. Mikhail Matveevich Danilov, who had been the commander of the 437th Rifle Regiment of 154th Rifle Division, and would hold command for the duration of this formation. During the day most of the 119th continued to support the 157th Tank Brigade to overcome or bypass Romanian strongpoints and other obstacles, with the goal of reaching the towns of Zhirkovskii and Perelazovskii deep in the enemy rear, while the 365th Rifle Regiment, along with the 50th Guards and supporting armor, fought to contain Romanian forces being encircled east of the Tsaritsa River. The 365th seized Hill 208.0, then pushed on eastward with the tanks to the west bank of the river by midday, beginning the process of encircling the 1st Romanian Armored Division and other Romanian forces to the east. The Romanian tanks attempted to break out southwest to link up with German XXXXVIII Panzer Corps, but were unsuccessful, and lost 25 vehicles in the process.

The following day, Colonel Danilov "castled" his regiments southwards along the Tsaritsa, then attacked eastwards against the remnants of the Romanian armor, advancing up to 5km. The goal was to link up with the 277th Rifle Division of 21st Army and complete the encirclement of the remaining eastern forces of Romanian 3rd Army, now known as Group Lascar. At 2000 hrs. the leading elements of the two rifle divisions joined hands west of Verkhne-Cherenskii, completing the first major encirclement of Axis forces in Operation Uranus. Early on November 22 the division joined with the 50th Guards, 216th Tank Brigade, and one regiment of the 346th Rifle Division to attack Group Lascar's defenses along and east of the Tsaritsa. The division attacked eastward and northeastward, captured Korotkovskii, and then got into a fight to capture Zhirkovskii against strong resistance. At this point the 1st Romanian Armored made an attempt to break out of the pocket, with roughly 20 R-2 tanks and 220 trucks and other vehicles. This force pushed through the 119th's defenses, after which it fought a running battle with Soviet cavalry and tanks to the rear. The division's forces ignored the breakout as best they could, before lunging with the 50th Guards east towards the town of Golovskii, 10km to the east, which was the headquarters of Group Lascar. While the Romanian group made plans to break out, in defiance of orders from the German high command, the two Soviet divisions engaged the Romanian 6th Infantry Division in a running fight that lasted from 1600 to 2100 hrs., while Group Lascar was also being severely pressed by 21st Army. Golovskii fell to 50th Guards at 2100 hrs., completely disrupting the Romanian command.

November 23 saw the rifle forces of 5th Tank Army attempting to destroy the encircled Romanian group. The 119th captured the Romanian strongpoint at Zhirkovskii early in the morning, then dispatched one of its rifle regiments southward to intercept a Romanian column from escaping, while the remaining regiments drove eastwards into the center of the shrinking pocket. These captured Verkhne-Cherenskii at 1400 hrs. and linked up with the 333rd Rifle Division of 21st Army. At the same time, the left-flank regiment joined hands with that Army's 96th and 63rd Rifle Divisions, further sub-dividing the pocket. Overnight many Romanians were taken prisoner, including General Lascar. It fell to Brig. Gen. Trajan Stanescu, Lascar's deputy, to seek a formal surrender of 3rd Army, which went into effect at 0230 hrs. on November 24. The remaining Romanians surrendered over the next 12 hours, a total of 27,000 officers and men, including 5,000 from the escaping column intercepted by the regiment of the 119th and other Soviet forces. Following this, the division got a brief rest while it prepared to exploit to the Oblivskaya area on the Chir River.

=== Battle for Surovikino ===
On November 25 the 119th was tasked with the liberation of Surovikino, relieving 1st Tank Corps, and then with a drive across the lower Chir. This town proved a tough nut to crack, and the German defenders were still holding out in the evening of November 27, when the division was joined by the 333rd Rifle. 24 hours later Surovikino continued to hold out. On the morning of the 30th the division penetrated into the town's northern outskirts, where it entered into street fighting with the defenders of composite Group Schmidt, while the 333rd carved out a bridgehead over the Chir to the east. The fighting for Surovikino continued through the first three days of December, while 5th Tank Army prepared for a new offensive towards Tormosin, based from the 333rd's bridgehead. The goal of the offensive was to disrupt any German offensive from the lower Chir to relieve their forces surrounded at Stalingrad; the 119th's goal was to complete the liberation of Surovikino and then to attack across the river with two regiments, along with two regiments of the 321st Rifle Division. When the offensive began on December 9, the advance battalions of the two divisions encountered intense small arms and artillery fire from a very mixed group of Axis forces that forced them to go to ground. The full offensive was then postponed to the next day.

The sporadic fighting for Surovikino continued over the next several days. Finally, owing to the expansion of Soviet bridgeheads over the Chir to the east and west, despite the efforts of 11th Panzer Division to throw them back, the German position in the town became untenable, and it was evacuated overnight on December 14–15, with the 119th taking possession. As a result of this success and those earlier in the campaign, the division was one of the first of the Stalingrad divisions raised to Guards status, becoming the 54th Guards Rifle Division on December 16.

== 3rd Formation ==
The final 119th Rifle Division began forming at Aleksin in the Moscow Military District, based on the 161st Rifle Brigade, in March 1943.

=== 161st Rifle Brigade ===
This rifle brigade was formed in February - March 1942 in the Moscow Military District. It was immediately assigned to the Moscow Defence Zone. In April it was moved to the 11th Army in Northwestern Front, on the north flank of the Soviet forces besieging the Demyansk Pocket. It was moved to 34th Army during this battle, and was there when the German forces evacuated in February 1943. Following this, the brigade became part of the 12th Guards Rifle Corps in the 27th Army in the area of Staraya Russa. In April the brigade was moved back to the Moscow Military District for rebuilding.

Again, the new division had an order of battle very similar to the previous formations:

- 365th Rifle Regiment
- 421st Rifle Regiment
- 634th Rifle Regiment
- 349th Artillery Regiment
- 216th Antitank Battalion
- 143rd Reconnaissance Company
- 224th Sapper Battalion
- 156th Signal Battalion (later 405th Signal Company)
- 137th Medical/Sanitation Battalion
- 129th Chemical Defense (Anti-gas) Company
- 104th Motor Transport Company
- 491st Field Bakery
- 300th Divisional Veterinary Hospital
- 1981st Field Postal Station
- 1200th Field Office of the State Bank

=== Into Belarus and the Baltic States ===
The division completed forming on April 19, when it was assigned to 3rd Reserve Army in the Reserve of the Supreme High Command. It was under the command of Col. Ivan Dmitrievich Panov who had been in command of the 161st Brigade, but he was replaced on July 27 by Maj. Gen. Yosif Ivanovich Khorun. The division was assigned to 21st Army in Western Front before the Operation Suvorov in August, and two months later reassigned to 60th Rifle Corps in Kalinin Front reserves. Shortly thereafter this Front was renamed 1st Baltic, and the division and its corps became part of 4th Shock Army.

4th Shock began a new offensive on November 2 in the directions of Polotsk and Vitebsk. 60th Corps, supported by the 143rd Tank Brigade, struck the defenses of the 87th Infantry Division and the much-depleted 2nd Luftwaffe Field Division on a 10km-wide front centered 16km south of Nevel. By November 6 the Corps had penetrated the enemy defenses to a depth of about 10km, at which point the 2nd Guards Rifle Corps was committed into the sector from the second echelon, with the mission "to widen the mouth to the south and destroy the defending enemy". Once a breakthrough was achieved, 4th Shock regrouped its forces to exploit; the 119th and the 357th Rifle Divisions were sent southwestwards towards Polotsk. Third Panzer Army's IX Army Corps scrambled to assemble several small combat groups to block the advance in this direction. By November 20 the division was on both sides of the Nevel - Polotsk railway in the area near Dretun, just 26km short of its objective, brought to a halt by an unexpected thaw and the resistance of German Group von Gottberg and the 211th Infantry Division. Due to the extended front held by 4th Shock, 60th Corps held these general positions into the new year.

In February 1944, the 119th was moved to 83rd Rifle Corps, where it remained for the duration of the war. Apart from a short reassignment to 1st Shock Army in March, the division was in 4th Shock Army until January 1945. At the start of the Soviet summer offensive the division was facing the German Panther Line defenses on the Drissa River, north of Polotsk. On July 18, following the breakthrough of these defenses and the exploitation to the west, General Khorun handed command of the division to Col. Ivan Mikhailovich Toropchin. By the beginning of August 4th Shock had reached the eastern outskirts of Daugavpils in Latvia. The advance continued until by mid-September it had arrived in the area of Biržai in northern Lithuania. The 119th's final change of command took place on October 18, when Colonel Toropchin was replaced by Col. Mikhail Lavrentevich Dudarenko. On October 22, the division was awarded the Order of Suvorov, 2nd Class, for its services in the liberation of Riga. In the new year the division and its corps were shifted to 42nd Army in 2nd Baltic Front, then to 10th Guards Army on the coast of the Baltic in March, guarding the cut-off German forces in the Courland Pocket. In mid-April the 83rd Corps went into the Reserve of the Supreme High Command in the 22nd Army, ending the war out of the front lines.

It appears the entire 83rd Rifle Corps, including the 119th Rifle Division, was disbanded in the Odessa Military District in 1945-46.
