= 85th Rifle Corps =

- Active: September 1943–January 1954
- Country: Soviet Union
- Branch: Red Army (Soviet Army from 1946)
- Type: Infantry (Rifle corps)
- Engagements: Soviet invasion of Manchuria (part of World War II)

The 85th Rifle Corps (Russian: 85-й стрелковый корпус) was a rifle corps of the Red Army and later the Soviet Army.

Formed in 1943 as part of the 17th Army of the Transbaikal Front, the corps spent the next two years as a garrison unit. In August 1945 its headquarters was used to provide a headquarters for the Soviet–Mongolian Cavalry-Mechanized Group during the Soviet invasion of Manchuria. Postwar, the corps garrisoned the Kuril Islands before being disbanded in the early 1950s.

== World War II ==
The corps was formed in September 1943, under the command of Major General Nikanor Samonov. Part of the 17th Army of the Transbaikal Front, it included the 36th and 57th Motor Rifle Divisions, stationed in the Mongolian People's Republic, as well as the 284th Rifle Division and the 1st and 3rd Motor Rifle Regiments. On 4 April 1944, 57th Motor Rifle Division commander Major General Viktor Nikiforov replaced Samonov. The 284th Division and the two motor rifle regiments were directly subordinated to the army headquarters in December, leaving the 85th with only the 36th and 57th Divisions. From July 1945, the corps headquarters was used to provide a headquarters for the Soviet–Mongolian Cavalry-Mechanized Group. In this capacity, it participated in the Soviet invasion of Manchuria. Nikiforov served as chief of staff of the group during this period.

== Postwar ==
On 26 September 1945, the corps headquarters was transferred from the Transbaikal region to the Kuril Islands. The corps, with Military Unit Number 64105, was headquartered in Kurilsk, part of the Far Eastern Military District. It included the 355th Rifle Division at Iturup, the 2nd Separate Rifle Brigade at Urup, and the 113th Separate Rifle Brigade at Kunashir. In 1946 the 23rd Machine-Gun Artillery Brigade at Kunashir was part of the corps; it was formed from the 112th (Khorol) Fortified Region. In the spring of 1948, the 23rd Brigade became the 36th Machine-Gun Artillery Regiment, while around the same time the 355th Division, 2nd Brigade, and 113th Brigade were reorganized into the 7th, 20th, and 15th Machine-Gun Artillery Divisions, respectively. The corps was disbanded in January 1954.

== Commanders ==
The following officers are known to have commanded the corps:

- Major General Nikanor Samonov (15 September 1943–3 April 1944)
- Major General Viktor Nikiforov (4 April 1944–January 1946)
- Lieutenant General Alexei Danilov (January–June 1946)
- Lieutenant General Ivan Ivanovich Ivanov (June 1946–October 1949)
