= 2nd Rifle Corps =

Red Army military unit

- Active: 1st formation: September 1922–August 1941; 2nd formation: May 1942–November 1945; Postwar: from 1955
- Country: Soviet Union
- Branch: Red Army
- Type: Infantry
- Engagements: World War II; 1st formation: Battle of Bialystok–Minsk; 2nd formation: Soviet invasion of Manchuria

Commanders
- Notable commanders: 1st formation: Vitovt Putna; Vasily Kuznetsov; 2nd formation: Anton Lopatin

The 2nd Rifle Corps was an infantry corps of the Red Army during the interwar period and World War II, formed twice.

== First formation ==
It was formed in September 1922 as the 2nd Army Corps in accordance with orders dated 10 June, 18 July, and 12 September, headquartered at Moscow in the military district named for the city. It was redesignated as the 2nd Rifle Corps by an order of 8 March 1923. By 1935 it was named in honor of Vladimir Triandafillov and included the 2nd Corps Artillery Regiment at Ryazan and the 84th Rifle Division (Territorial) at Tula. Relocated to Kalinin in the Belorussian Military District during 1936, the corps became part of the Kalinin Military District upon the creation of the latter in July 1938, relocating to Velikiye Luki. After the Soviet occupation of the Baltic states, the 2nd Rifle Corps relocated to the Baltic Special Military District, where it was stationed at Libava, Karya-Osta, and Dvinsk in Latvia. By May 1941 it had been transferred to Bielsk Podlaski in the Western Special Military District.

When Operation Barbarossa, the German invasion of the Soviet Union, began on 22 June, the corps, under the command of Major General Arkady Yermakov (who became commander on 29 July 1940), was part of the Western Special Military District, with the 100th and 161st Rifle Divisions assigned. Corps support units included the 10th Separate Communications and the 5th Separate Sapper Battalions. With the 13th Army of the Western Front, the 2nd Rifle Corps participated in the Battle of Bialystok-Minsk near the Minsk and Slutsk Fortified Regions during late June and early July 1941. The corps was disbanded on 20 August.

== Second formation ==
The corps was reformed in May 1942 under the command of Major General Daniil Petrov from 28 May. Corps support units included the 10th Separate Communications and 967th Separate Sapper Battalions, as well as the 1999th Military Postal Station. In January 1945, the corps, directly subordinated to the headquarters of the Transbaikal Front comprised the 103rd, 275th, 292nd and 293rd Rifle Divisions; in June the 293rd would be reassigned as a separate rifle division in 36th Army. During August it fought in the Soviet invasion of Manchuria. The corps was disbanded in November 1945 at Borzya in Chita Oblast.

== Postwar ==
On 4 March 1955, a number of formations were redesignated in the Soviet Far East. 87th Rifle Corps was renamed 2nd Rifle Corps; the 342nd Rifle Division was renamed the 56th Rifle Division; and the 258th Rifle Red Banner Division became the 41st Rifle Red Banner Division (144th and 465th Rifle Regiments).

In March 1957, rifle divisions were reformed into motor-rifle divisions. On 17 May 1957, the 56th Rifle Division became the 56th Motor-Rifle Division (in this case the 357th Rifle Regiment was renamed as the 390th Rifle Regiment); The 79th Rifle Sakhalin Division was renamed the 79th Motor-Rifle Sakhalin Division.

On 28 March 1960 the 2nd Army Corps was reformed at Yuzhno-Sakhalinsk, Sakhalin Oblast. The corps included the 56th and 79th Motor Rifle Divisions, and the 410th independent Motor Rifle Regiment at Sovetskaya Gavan in Khabarovsk Krai.

It became the 51st Army (Soviet Union) in 1977.
