= Transbaikal Front =

WW2 Soviet Red Army formation

The Transbaikal Front (Russian: Забайкальский фронт, romanized: Zabaykal'skiy front) was a front (army group) formed on September 15, 1941, on the basis of the Transbaikal Military District. Initially, it included the 17th and 36th armies, but in August 1942 the 12th Air Army was added to the front, and, finally, in June–July 1945 the 39th and the 53rd armies, the 6th Guards Tank Army, and the Soviet Mongolian Cavalry Mechanized Group under Issa Pliyev were added.

Soviet invasion of Manchuria, August 1945, with the Transbaikal Front entering from the northwest.

From September 1941 to January 1945, the Transbaikal Front sent to the Soviet fronts in Europe about 300,000 personnel, 1,440 tanks, and 2,230 guns.

On November 1, 1941, the Front included the 17th Army with the 36th and 57th Motor Rifle Divisions and the 61st Tank Division, and four air divisions (two fighter, one bomber, and the 84th Mixed Aviation Division), the 36th Army with the 94th Rifle Division, the 210th Rifle Division, the 51st Cavalry Division, and the 31st and 32nd Fortified Regions, the 111th Tank Division, two independent tank battalions, and the 89th Assault Aviation Division. Front troops included the 209th Rifle Division.

On May 1, 1945, the Front included the 17th Army with the 85th Rifle Corps (36th and 57th Motor Rifle Divisions), the 284th Rifle Division, another rifle unit, significant numbers of artillery units, the 61st Tank Division, the 36th Army with the 86th Rifle Corps (94th and 298th Rifle Divisions), the 209th, 210th, 278th Rifle Divisions, and 31st Fortified Region, and the 2nd Rifle Corps (103rd, 275th, 292nd Rifle Divisions) plus at front level the 293rd Rifle Division, 59th Cavalry Division, and other units.

== Soviet invasion of Manchuria ==
The armies and corps of the front under Rodion Malinovsky participated in the Soviet invasion of Manchuria during August 1945 defeating the Kwantung Army of the Imperial Japanese Army. The fighting had lasted for only about a week when Japan's Emperor Hirohito read the Gyokuon-hōsō on August 15 and declared a ceasefire in the region on August 16. Soviet forces were already penetrating deep into Manchukuo by that time. They continued their largely unopposed advance into Manchukuo's territory, reaching Mukden, Changchun, and Qiqihar by August 20. At the same time, Mengjiang was invaded by the Red Army and its Mongol allies, with Guihua quickly taken. The Emperor of Manchukuo (and the former Emperor of China), Puyi, was captured by the Soviet Red Army and sent to Chita.

After the operation on October 9, 1945, the Transbaikal Front was disbanded and reorganized into the Transbaikal-Amur Military District.

== Commanders-in-chief of the front ==
- Mikhail Kovalyov (July 1941 – July 1945)
- Rodion Malinovsky (July–October 1945)
