= 36th Rifle Division =

36th Motor Rifle Division (1940–1946) 36th Motorized Division (1937–1940) 36th Rifle Division (1919–1937) (1946–1956)
- Active: 1919–1956
- Country: Soviet Union
- Branch: Red Army
- Type: Infantry
- Size: Division
- Engagements: Russian Civil War Sino-Soviet conflict (1929); Battles of Khalkhin Gol; World War II: Manchurian Strategic Offensive Operation
- Decorations: Order of Lenin
- Battle honours: Transbaikal Khingan

The 36th Rifle Division (Russian: 36-я стрелковая дивизия) was a division of the Red Army and then the Soviet Army. The division was formed in 1919 as the 36th Rifle Division and fought in the Russian Civil War and the Sino-Soviet conflict of 1929. In 1937 it became the 36th Motorized Division. The division fought in the Battles of Khalkhin Gol. It was converted into a motor rifle division in 1940 and fought in the Soviet invasion of Manchuria in World War II. Postwar, it became a rifle division again before its disbandment in 1956. The division spent almost its entire service in the Soviet Far East.

== History ==
=== Russian Civil War ===
The division was first formed as the 36th Rifle Division based on the 9th Army's expeditionary division on 19 July 1919. It fought in the Russian Civil War and was part of the 9th Army between 1919 and 1920. In summer 1921, the division participated in the campaign against Roman von Ungern-Sternberg's forces in Mongolia. On 4 June 1923, the division was given the honorary designation "Transbaikal".

=== 1929 Sino-Soviet conflict ===
The Special Far Eastern Army was formed on 6 August 1929, and the 36th RD became part of then newly formed army. In the second half of August, alleged Chinese provocations on the border of the Soviet Far East increased. The commander of the troops of the army ordered elements of the division to positions on the border. The division, without the 106th Rifle Regiment, was positioned in Borzya. Due to the tense border situation, the 108th Rifle Regiment was transported to the site of a possible incident. On 16 August, one platoon of the regiment repulsed a Chinese attack near the village of Abagaytuevsky. A major incident occurred on 18 August in the 108th Rifle Regiment sector. During the early morning hours of that day, Chinese artillery reportedly began shelling Soviet territory. By 1100, three companies of Chinese infantry were attacking. To aid Soviet border guards, infantry and artillery were sent in. Soviet troops attacked the Chinese trenches on the other side of the border and reportedly captured them. With Soviet troops in their rear, the attacking Chinese troops were reportedly routed and the Soviet troops returned to the border.

In November, the division fought in the Manchurian operation. The objective of the operation was to defeat the Chinese Manchurian group of the Mukden army, establish Soviet border security and secure Soviet access to the Chinese Eastern Railway. During the operation, the Special Far Eastern Army was commanded by Vasily Blyukher. To accomplish these objectives, the Transbaikal Group was established within the army.

The division was to attack to encircle the Chinese troops at Dalainor. The attack was launched on 17 November. The division lost contact with its artillery support and was unable to coordinate with attached tanks. Its 106th Regiment was able to break through and by the end of the day advanced on Manchouli from the south, linking up with the 21st Rifle Division's 63rd Regiment. This encircled the Manchouli garrison. The division captured Hailar during the operation on 27 November, ending military operations in the conflict.

=== Battles of Khalkhin Gol ===
By 1933, the division was stationed at Chita. On 20 August 1937, it became the 36th Motorized Division. (ru: 36-я моторизованную дивизия) In late 1938, it was moved from Chita to Ude. Around this time the division became part of the new 57th Special Corps. In 1939, the regiments were renumbered. The 106th, 107th, and 108th Rifle Regiments became respectively, the 24th, 76th, and 149th Motor Rifle Regiments.

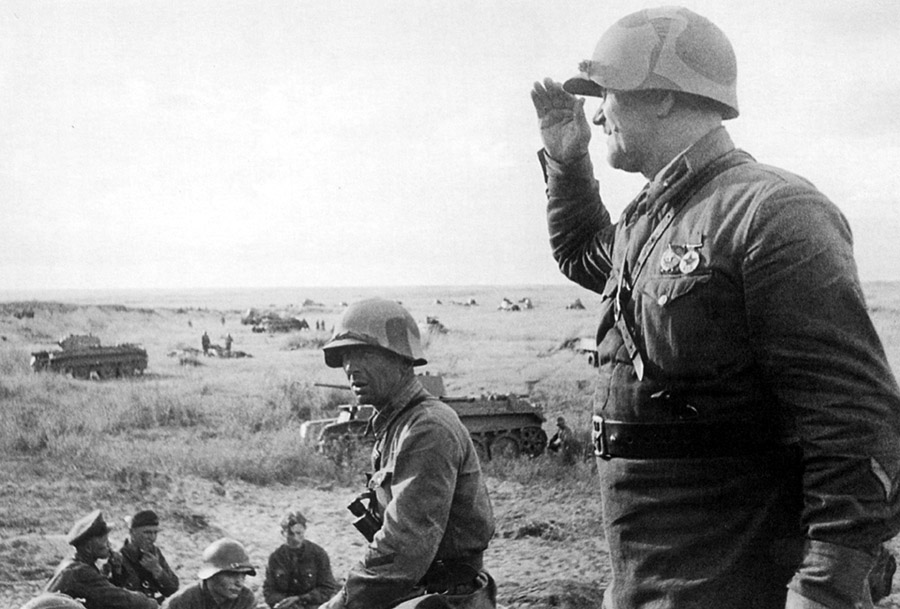
The commander of the 149th Motor Rifle Regiment before the offensive

The division fought during the Battles of Khalkhin Gol in summer 1939. On 28 May, the division's 149th Motor Rifle Regiment, led by Major Ivan Remizov, was transported by truck to Khalkhin Gol from Tamsag Bulag. Due being sent into the battle piecemeal, the regiment had "little effect on operations". On the morning of the 29th the Soviet and Mongolian troops were able to push back the Japanese troops two kilometers. In early June, the division was sent into the battle as a reinforcement, less one regiment. On 8 July, Remizov was killed in action and later awarded the title Hero of the Soviet Union posthumously.

The 24th Motor Rifle Regiment, led by Lieutenant Colonel Ivan Fedyuninsky, was sent into the battle in mid-July. During the counteroffensive at Khalkhin Gol, the division's 149th and 24th Motor Rifle Regiments were part of the Central Group, which held Japanese forces in the center. The division's two regiments were deployed north of the Holsten in east-facing positions in the Remizov sector (Height 733) of Balshagal. The two regiments were to encircle and destroy Japanese troops north of the Holsten in conjunction with the 82nd Motorized Division and the Northern Group. The force was supported by two battalions from the 175th Artillery Regiment. The division encountered strong opposition advancing on Height 733. On 23 August, 149th Rifle Regiment battalion commander Andrey Yermakov was killed in action. He was later posthumously awarded the title Hero of the Soviet Union for his actions. For its actions during the battles the division received the Order of Lenin on 17 November 1939. Its 24th Motor Rifle Regiment and 175th Artillery Regiment also received the Order of Lenin, and the 149th Motor Rifle Regiment received the Order of the Red Banner. 175th Artillery Regiment divizion (battalion) commander Alexander Rybkin received the title Hero of the Soviet Union for his actions. After the battles the division was relocated to Sainshand. Its 76th and 149th Motor Rifle Regiments were stationed at Dzamyn Ude. The division became part of the 17th Army.

=== Soviet invasion of Manchuria ===
On 15 January 1940 it became a motor rifle division. On 22 June 1941, the division, along with the 57th Motor Rifle Division, was with the 17th Army, part of the Transbaikal Front. In August 1945, it fought in the Soviet invasion of Manchuria as part of the 6th Guards Tank Army. From 9 August, it was attached to the 7th Mechanized Corps. On 12 August, due to lack of fuel, the division was reassigned to the army's second echelon.

=== Postwar ===
In October 1945 the division (Military Unit Number 38036) was part of 6th Guards Tank Army, but joined 86th Rifle Corps within 36th Army sometime between August 1946 and April 1947. On 2 July 1955 86th Rifle Corps became 26th Rifle Corps. After having been converted back into a rifle division in June 1946, the division disbanded while in 26th Rifle Corps on 25 July 1956.

== Commanders ==
The following officers commanded the division.

- Pyotr Bryanskikh (December 1923–August 1925)
- Mikhail Khozin (January 1932–May 1935)
- Colonel (Kombrig 15 June 1937) Ivan Yemlin (arrested)
- Major (Colonel) Ivan Dorofeyev (2 June 1938–Unknown)
- Kombrig Daniil Petrov (June 1939–January 1941)
- Colonel Ilya Dudarev (8 January 1941–16 February 1942)
- Lieutenant Colonel (Colonel) Nikolai Sobenko (26 March 1942–22 August 1944)
- Lieutenant Colonel Fyodor Zhuravlev (23 August–21 November 1944)
- Colonel Ivan Vasilievich Melnikov (22 November 1944–8 March 1945)
- Colonel Gennady Krivokhizhin (9 March 1945–3 September 1945)
- Major General Vasily Shatilov (c. May 1949–c. May 1952)
- Major General Vasily Shugayev (May 1952–c. May 1954)

== Composition ==
The division was composed of the following units on 22 June 1941.

- 24th Motor Rifle Regiment
- 76th Motor Rifle Regiment
- 149th Motor Rifle Regiment
- 36th Motor Artillery Regiment
- 133rd Armored Reconnaissance Battalion
- 37th Motor Antiaircraft Artillery Battalion
- 67th Motor Antitank Battalion
- 252nd Motor Engineer Battalion
- 1st Motor Signal Battalion
- 61st Motor Chemical Company
- 14th Truck Battalion
- 61st Motor Maintenance Battalion
- 161st Motor Medical Battalion
