= 52nd Rifle Corps =

- Allegiance: Soviet Union
- Branch: Soviet Red Army
- Engagements: Eastern Front (World War II); Operation Barbarossa

The 52nd Rifle Corps was a corps of the Soviet Red Army. It was part of the 24th Army. It took part in the Eastern Front of World War II.

== Organization ==
- 91st Rifle Division
- 119th Rifle Division
- 166th Rifle Division

== Commanders ==
- Franz Perkhorovich
