= 91st Motor Rifle Division =

Motor rifle division of the Soviet military

- Active: 1957–1959; 1970–1987
- Country: Soviet Union
- Branch: Red Army
- Type: Infantry, Motorized Infantry
- Decorations: Order of the Red Banner (1st formation); Order of Suvorov 2nd class (1st formation)
- Battle honours: Melitopol (1st formation)

The 91st Motor Rifle Division was a division of the Soviet Army, formed twice. The division was first formed from a rifle division in 1957 and disbanded two years later. The division was reformed in 1970 without inheriting the lineage of the first formation, and was stationed in Mongolia between 1979 and 1987. After being pulled back to the Soviet Union it was downsized into a territorial training center, which later became a storage base.

== First formation ==
In June 1957 the 91st Melitopolskaya Order of Suvorov MRD (Military Unit Number (v/ch) 34562) was formed at Perm in the Ural Military District from the 91st Rifle Division. It comprised four regiments, all at Perm: the 2nd Motorised Rifle Regiment; the 26th Motorised Rifle Regiment; the 434th Guards Motorised Rifle Regiment; and the 345th Tank Regiment. It was disbanded on 1 March 1959.

== Second formation ==
In July 1970 the 91st Motor Rifle Division (Military Unit Number (v/ch) 58421) was reformed for the second time at Chistye Kluychi (Shelekhov) in Irkutsk Oblast from the 362nd Motor Rifle Regiment of the 52nd Motor Rifle Division. It did not have the 'Melitopol Order of Suvorov' honorifics that the 91st MRD (First Formation) had inherited from the 91st RD.

It moved to Mongolia in 1979. In 1987 it was withdrawn to Nizhneudinsk, and came under the control of 29th Army. The 91st MRD became the 497th Territorial Training centre in 1987, and 5209th Base for Storage of Weapons and Equipment (VKhVT) in October 1989. It then became the 6063rd Base for Storage of Weapons and Equipment in 1992, inheriting the honorifics and awards of the 15th Motor Rifle Division, just disbanded in the Transcaucasus Military District. It then became the 187th Weapons and Equipment Storage and Repair Base in 2009.
