= 292nd Rifle Division =

- Active: 1st formation: July–November 1941; 2nd formation: June–November 1942; 3rd formation: July 1943 – 1946
- Country: Soviet Union
- Branch: Red Army
- Type: Rifle division
- Engagements: World War II
- Battle honours: Khingan (3rd formation)

The 292nd Rifle Division (Russian: 292-я стрелковая дивизия) was an infantry division of the Soviet Union's Red Army during World War II, formed three times.

The division was first formed in the summer of 1941 and was destroyed near Leningrad in the fall of that year. Reformed in June 1942 from a rifle brigade, the 292nd was destroyed during counterattacks against the German advance north of Stalingrad in the fall of 1942. It was reformed in July 1943 in the Soviet Far East, and fought in the Soviet invasion of Manchuria in August 1945, before being disbanded in 1946.

== History ==
=== First Formation ===
The 292nd Rifle Division began forming from individual replacements on 2 July 1941 in the Moscow Military District. Its basic order of battle included the 1007th, 1009th, and 1011th Rifle Regiments, as well as the 833rd Artillery Regiment. The partially-formed division was hurriedly moved to the front at Kirishi near Leningrad, where it arrived on 24 August. The 292nd was assigned to the new 52nd Army, but transferred to the 4th Army by the end of September. The division fought in defensive battles east of the Volkhov River and the Tikhvin Offensive in early November. The latter successfully recaptured Tikhvin from the German troops, and was one of the first German operational defeats in the war. As a result of heavy losses, the 292nd was disbanded on 30 November 1941.

=== Second Formation ===
The 292nd was reformed on 9 June 1942 from a rifle brigade in the Moscow area, part of the Reserve of the Supreme High Command. It included the same rifle regiments as the first formation. The division was immediately assigned to the 10th Reserve Army. In August the 292nd was sent to the front with the Stalingrad Front's 24th Army. As part of the army, the division fought in counterattacks against the German flank north of Stalingrad during September and October, suffering heavy losses. As a result, the division was disbanded on 5 November and its remnants used as replacements for other Don Front divisions. This was one of the last times in the war that a number of divisions were disbanded due to casualties.

=== Third Formation ===
The 292nd was reformed for the third and last time on 15 July 1943 in the Transbaikal Front reserves in the Soviet Far East. It included the same regiments as the previous formations. The division became part of the 2nd Rifle Corps, and served with it for the entire war. In July 1945 the corps was assigned to the 36th Army, and in August the division fought n the Soviet invasion of Manchuria. Most of the army's fighting was conducted by its mobile group, and the 292nd's sole notable combat was an assault crossing of the Argun River between 8 and 9 August using boats, pontoons, and Lend-Lease DUKW amphibious trucks. The division received the honorific "Khingan" for its actions, and was disbanded during the spring and summer of 1946 as part of the Transbaikal-Amur Military District.
