= 86th Rifle Corps =

Red/Soviet Army unit

- Active: August 1943–July 1955
- Country: Soviet Union
- Branch: Red Army (Soviet Army from 1946)
- Type: Infantry (Rifle corps)
- Engagements: Soviet invasion of Manchuria (part of World War II)
- Battle honours: Khingan

The 86th Rifle Corps (Russian: 86-й стрелковый корпус) was a rifle corps of the Red Army and later the Soviet Army.

Formed in 1943 as part of the 36th Army of the Transbaikal Front, the corps spent the next two years as a garrison unit.

== World War II ==
In recognition of its crossing of the Greater Khingan mountains, the corps received the honorific Khingan in late 1945.

== Postwar ==
After the end of the war, the corps became part of the Transbaikal–Amur Military District along with the rest of the 36th Army. It was headquartered at Tsugol, Chita Oblast from late 1945 with Military Unit Number 68613 and included the 36th Motor Rifle and 94th Rifle Divisions. The 36th Division became a regular rifle division in June 1946. On 10 July 1947, the military district was reorganized into the Transbaikal Military District with its headquarters formed from the 36th Army headquarters. The 86th Corps headquarters was used to form a new headquarters for the 36th Army in Tsugol. On 2 July 1955, the corps was renumbered as the 26th Rifle Corps before being disbanded on 18 May 1956. Both the 36th and 94th Divisions were disbanded around the same time.

== Commanders ==
The following officers are known to have commanded the corps:

- Major General Vasily Viktorov (1 August 1943–3 April 1944)
- Major General Vladimir Akimov (4 April–6 December 1944)
- Major General Vasily Burmasov (7 December 1944–3 April 1945)
- Major General Grigory Revunenkov (4 April 1945–March 1947)
- Lieutenant General Ivan Kravtsov (March 1947–July 1950)
- Major General Mikhail Yagodin (July 1950–6 May 1952)
- Major General (promoted to Lieutenant General 8 August 1955) Ivan Kalyuzhny (6 May 1952–18 May 1956)
