= 87th Rifle Corps =

Military unit

The 87th Rifle Corps (Russian: 87-й стрелковый корпус) was a rifle corps of the Red Army during World War II and the Soviet Army in the early years of the Cold War.

== World War II ==
On 10 July 1945 it comprised 231st and 300th Rifle Divisions as part of 1st Red Banner Army, Maritime Group of Forces.

=== Service in the invasion of Manchuria ===
On the dawn of 8 August 1945 the artillery preparation of the invasion of Manchuria began when the USSR declared war on Japan.

On 9 August 1945 the corps received an order to commence operations, and to cross the international border in the region of Grodekovo settlement. The corps advanced through steep mountain slopes, impassable roads, under strong downpours, and over swampy areas.

In the course of the Manchurian offensive operation the 87th Rifle Corps moved in into the reserve of the 35th Army formations along the northern shore of Lake Khanka.

The 342nd Rifle Division was committed to battle once at the approaches to the Mishan (Japanese) Fortified Region. The 357th Rifle Regiment (from 342nd Rifle Division) reached Khobiy city in North Manchuria while constantly engaged in combat.

The 35th Army, from the staging area Guberovo, Ruzhino, Lesozavodsk, delivered the supporting attack of the 1st Far-Eastern Front (commander - Marshal of the Soviet Union K.A. Meretskov) in the direction of Lesozavodsk, Khutou, Mishan with the task of destroying the Mishan group of Japanese troops.

After assaulting across the Sungach river, the 342nd RD with 357th Rifle Regiment directed its concentrated efforts toward securing the area of Tsikhulin region, Khubey, and Yangan (50 kilometers west of Khulin). The stability of defence of the entire Japanese Mishansk Group depended on the retention of this region. As a result of persistent and bloody combat the 357th RR took the railway station and the city of Khubey.

For the next three days the division advanced as part of the corps second echelon into the depths of enemy held territory.

In the middle of August 1945 the 87th Rifle Corps returned to the area of Lesozavodsk – Sibirtsevo, where it entrained and was transported to Vladivostok. During this time (on 11 to 12 August 1945) the 87th Rifle Corps was brought out from the reserve of the 1st Far-Eastern Front, and received new orders to prepare for landing operations on the Japanese Home Islands of Hokkaido.

At the end of August 1945, the 87th RC moved from Harbin in its entirety (264th, 342nd, 355th RD) and began redeployment to Sakhalin for the purpose of concentrating the troops for the planned landing operation on the island of Hokkaido. This landing operation did not take place, but the corps still completed its concentration at Sakhalin. The Japanese opposing force on Sakhalin and the Kuriles was the Japanese Fifth Area Army.

At 0830 on 22 August 1945 the 355th RD of the 87th RC was taken out of the 1st Far-Eastern Front reserve and transported by the convoy VKMA-1 from Vladivostok to the port of Maoka (now Kholmsk of South-Sakhalin region), arriving at 1600 on 25 August 1945.

On 23 August 1945 the Supreme Commander-in-Chief I.V. Stalin declared his appreciation for 357th RR of the 342nd RD for conspicuous courage and heroism.

On 28 August 1945 the 355th RD began its advance into the region of the port of Otomari, and then force marched on 1 September 1945 to in the Otomari region.

On 1400 on 23 August 1945 a new convoy VKMA-2 departed from Vladivostok to the port of Maoka, which transported the 342nd Rifle Division and 215th Artillery Brigade of the 87th Rifle Corps, arriving at 1425 on 26 August 1945 at the port.

Although the 342nd was in the process of being transported to Sakhalin on 25 August, on 22 August Stalin had already ordered Vasilevsky to halt the planned landing preparations on Hokkaido until further notice. However he allowed the transfer of the 87th Rifle Corps to continue to Sakhalin.

By 27 August 1945 the landing operation on was Hokkaido postponed, and then completely abandoned.

At 0920 on 25 August 1945 the convoy VKMA-3 departed Vladivostok with the 264th Rifle Division and staff of the 87th Rifle Corps. Because of a breakdown in the screw propeller in the transport “Leo Tolstoy” the convoy had to berth at the Vladimir Bay, where it stood until 28 August 1945, eventually reaching Maoka at 1330 on 30 August 1945.

At 0000 on 30 August 1945 the 87th RC was transferred to the 2nd Far East Front by order of Marshal of the Soviet Union A.M. Vasilevsky. The corps became a part of the 16th Army.

Unloading the last regiment of the 264th RD on Sakhalin was completed at 1900 on 1 September 1945.

On 2 September 1945 the transportation of the 87th Rifle Corps to Sakhalin island was completed.

== Postwar ==
The corps moved its headquarters from Aniva to Yuzhno-Sakhalinsk on 2 October 1945. On 1 November it was directly subordinated to the Far Eastern Military District, with the Kuriles-based 355th Division and the 2nd and 113th Separate Rifle Brigades being simultaneously transferred to the 85th Rifle Corps. The corps was left with the 264th and 342nd Rifle Divisions on Sakhalin. In May 1953, the corps headquarters was relocated to the mainland, leaving its troops behind on Sakhalin. It became part of the 25th Army with headquarters at Chuguyevka, including the 63rd Rifle and 18th Machine Gun Artillery Division from 7 August. The corps was renumbered as the 32nd Rifle Corps in 1955 and disbanded in mid-1956.

== Commanders ==
The following officers commanded the corps:

- Major General Feofan Parkhomenko (10 August – 16 November 1943)
- Major General Fyodor Borisov (9 December 1943 – 31 August 1945)
- Lieutenant General Alexander Ksenofontov (1 September 1945 – 17 September 1947)
- Lieutenant General Dmitry Onuprienko (18 September 1947 – July 1951)
- Major General Yevgeny Korkuts (30 October 1952 – 2 June 1953)
- Lieutenant General Ivan Grigorievsky (3 June 1953 – September 1955)
- Lieutenant General Dmitry Sobolev (October 1955 – June 1956)
