= 17th Army (Soviet Union) =

- 17-я армия
- Active: 1940–1946
- Country: Soviet Union
- Branch: Red Army
- Type: Combined arms
- Size: Field army
- Part of: Transbaikal Front
- Garrison/HQ: Ulaan Bataar
- Engagements: World War II; Invasion of Manchuria
- Decorations: Order of the Red Banner (Mongolia)

Commanders
- Notable commanders: Pavel Kurochkin

The 17th Army (Russian: 17-я армия) of the Red Army was a Soviet field army. Formed in 1940, the army served in the Soviet Far East during World War II and fought in the Soviet invasion of Manchuria in August 1945. It was disbanded postwar in mid-1946.

== History ==
The 17th Army was formed from the 1st Army Group of the Transbaikal Military District on 21 June 1940. From 1941 to 1945, the army assumed a general defensive posture, including within Mongolia. On 22 June 1941 it included the 57th and 61st Tank Divisions, and the 36th and 57th Motor Rifle and 82nd Motor Rifle Divisions. On 15 September, the Transbaikal Military District became the Transbaikal Front.

During the Soviet invasion of Manchuria, the army was assigned to the Transbaikal Front. On the night of 9 August 1945, without artillery and air support, the 17th Army began the attack. By the end of the day the main forces of the army had advanced 50 kilometers, and the best part of the passing of the day, about 70 miles, reached the area of the lake Lake Tabun-Nur. On the third day of the Khingan–Mukden Offensive Operation, in cooperation with the Soviet-Mongolian Cavalry mechanized group, the 17th Army approached the south-western spurs of the Greater Khingan Mountains. In the later days of the operation the army successfully overcame Japanese opposition, and repulsed counterattacks in the area of Linxi. By the end of 14 August 1945, the 17th Army captured the Dabanshan - Tszinpen area. On 16 August Udanchen was captured. In late August 1945 in conjunction with the mechanized cavalry group of the front's main forces the 17th Army reached the area of Linyuan, and one of the divisions of the army was on the coast of Liaodong Bay near the town of Shanhaiguan. In the same area on 31 August 1945 the 17th Army ended combat operations.

During the invasion of Manchuria, the 17th Army included

- 209th Rifle Division,
- 278th Rifle Division,
- 284th Rifle Division,
- 70th Separate Tank Battalion,
- 82nd Separate Tank Battalion,
- 56th Tank Destroyer Artillery Brigade,
- 185th Gun Artillery Regiment,
- 413th Howitzer Artillery Regiment,
- 1910th Tank Destroyer Regiment,
- 178th Mortar Regiment,
- 39th Guards Mortar Regiment,
- 1916th Antiaircraft Artillery Regiment,
- 66th Separate Antiaircraft Artillery Battalion,
- 282nd Separate Antiaircraft Artillery Battalion,
- 67th Mortar Brigade.

After the end of the war with Japan, the army became part of the Transbaikal-Amur Military District (formed from the Transbaikal Front) on 10 September 1945, and was disbanded between July and August 1946.

== Commanders ==
The army was commanded by the following officers during the war:

=== Commanders ===
- 21 June 1940-January 1941 — Lieutenant General Pavel Kurochkin
- 14 January 1941 – 15 May 1942 — Lieutenant General Prokofy Romanenko
- 15 May 1942 – 18 November 1943 — Major General Anton Gastilovich
- 18 November 1943 – 2 September 1945 — Lieutenant General Alexei Danilov

=== Members of the Military Soviet ===
- 1940-28 November 1943 — divisional commissar, 20 December 1942 Major General Stepan Novikov
- 28 November 1943- 6 August 1946 — Major General, from 8 September 1945 Lieutenant General Vasily Emelyanov

=== Chiefs of Staff ===
- 1940 to 15 May 1942 — Major General Anton Gastilovich
- 15 May 1942 – 9 November 1942 — Colonel Semyon Protas
- 9 November 1942 – 15 August 1946 — Colonel, from December 1942 Major General Alexey Spirov
