= 94th Rifle Division =

- Active: 1932–1956
- Country: Soviet Union
- Branch: Red Army (Soviet Army from 1946)
- Type: Infantry
- Engagements: Soviet invasion of Manchuria
- Decorations: Order of the Red Banner

The 94th Rifle Division (Russian: 94-я стрелковая дивизия) was an infantry division of the Red Army that became part of the Soviet Army. Formed in the 1930s, the division spent World War II in the Transbaikal Military District, seeing its only combat in the Soviet invasion of Manchuria. The division continued to serve in the Transbaikal postwar until its disbandment in 1956.

== History ==
The 94th Rifle Division was formed in early 1932 as a territorial unit of the Siberian Military District. The regiments of the division were based in Krasnoyarsk and nearby Achinsk. As a result of the Battles of Khalkhin Gol, cadres from the division were used to form the new 119th Rifle Division in Krasnoyarsk and the 91st Rifle Division in Achinsk during August and September 1939. The 94th was sent to the Transbaikal Military District in July 1939, but did not see action. During 1940 and 1941 the division was part of the 12th Rifle Corps of the district, and in July 1941 became part of the 36th Army, formed from the 12th Rifle Corps. The division included the following elements when the war began:

- 9th Rifle Regiment
- 64th Rifle Regiment
- 152nd Rifle Regiment
- 97th Artillery Regiment
- 83rd Reconnaissance Battalion
- 158th Separate Destroyer Anti-Tank Battalion
- 491st Separate Anti-Aircraft Artillery Battalion
- 124th Sapper Battalion
- 99th Separate Signals Battalion
- 95th Auto Transport Company
- 118th Medical-Sanitary Battalion
- 37th Separate Chemical Defense Company
- 89th Field Bakery

The division spent most of World War II covering the border southeast of Chita. Colonel Ivan Zamakhayev commanded the division from 30 April 1943 and was promoted to major general on 2 November 1944. The 94th did not see action until August 1945, when it fought in the Soviet invasion of Manchuria as part of the 36th Army. The main forces of the division crossed the Argun into Manchuria without artillery preparation on the night of 9 August and entered sustained fighting for the Jalainur-Manzhouli fortified region, simultaneously advancing to the north on Hailar. As part of the army mobile group, the division conducted a turning movement and on 10 August surprised the Japanese defenders by attacking the city from the east, joining the battle for the Hailar fortified region. The division then continued the offensive deeper into Manchuria. Crossing the Greater Khingan, the division captured Boketu, Yalu, and Zalantun on 17 August, and Qiqihar on 19 August. For its performance in the invasion, the 94th was awarded the Order of the Red Banner on 19 September 1945.

In October 1945 the division (Military Unit Number 06126) was still part of the 86th Rifle Corps within 36th Army. On 2 July 1955 86th Rifle Corps became 26th Rifle Corps. The 94th was based at Sretensk by 1955 and was disbanded on 25 July 1956.

== Commanders ==
The following officers commanded the division:

- Colonel Nikanor Ivanovich Samonov (16 November 1940 – 29 April 1943, major general 20 December 1942)
- Colonel Ivan Vasilyevich Zamakhayev (30 April 1943 – after 3 September 1945, major general 2 November 1944)
- Colonel Konstantin Fyodorovich Mayorov (7 January – 27 January 1946)
- Major General Vladislav Nikolayevich Kushnarenko (27 January 1946–25 January 1927)
- Major General Semyon Savvich Velichko (19 April 1947–May 1949)
- Colonel Fyodor Pavlovich Zhuravlyov (May 1949–October 1952)
- Major General Grigory Sergeyevich Dudnik (5 August 1953–29 November 1954)
- Colonel Viktor Titovich Yaglenko (29 November 1954–8 May 1956)
