= 53rd Rifle Division =

- Active: 1931–1946 (1st Formation); 1955 (2nd Formation)
- Country: Soviet Union
- Branch: Red Army
- Type: Infantry
- Size: Division
- Engagements: World War II; First Battle of Smolensk; Battle of Moscow; Battle of the Dnieper; Uman–Botosani Offensive; Second Jassy–Kishinev Offensive; Budapest Offensive; Prague Offensive
- Decorations: Order of the Red Banner (1st formation); Order of Suvorov, 2nd class (1st and 2nd formations)
- Battle honours: Novoukrainka (1st formation); Named for Friedrich Engels (1st formation); Novorossiysk (2nd formation)

The 53rd Rifle Division was an infantry division of the Red Army that served from the early 1930s to the immediate postwar period following World War II.

== Interwar period ==
The 53rd was formed in 1931 as a territorial division; Ivan Boldin became its first commander and military commissar in April of that year, and would hold that position until December 1934. It was stationed in the Volga Military District with the 12th Rifle Corps. By 1935, the division was headquartered at Engels and included the 157th Rifle Regiment at Engels, the 158th Rifle Regiment at Krasny Kut, the 159th Rifle Regiment at Pugachyov, and the 53rd Artillery Regiment at Pugachyov. On 8 July 1937 it received the honorific "named for Friedrich Engels". Before the war it became part of the 21st Army in the Gomel Region of the Western Special Military District.

== World War II ==
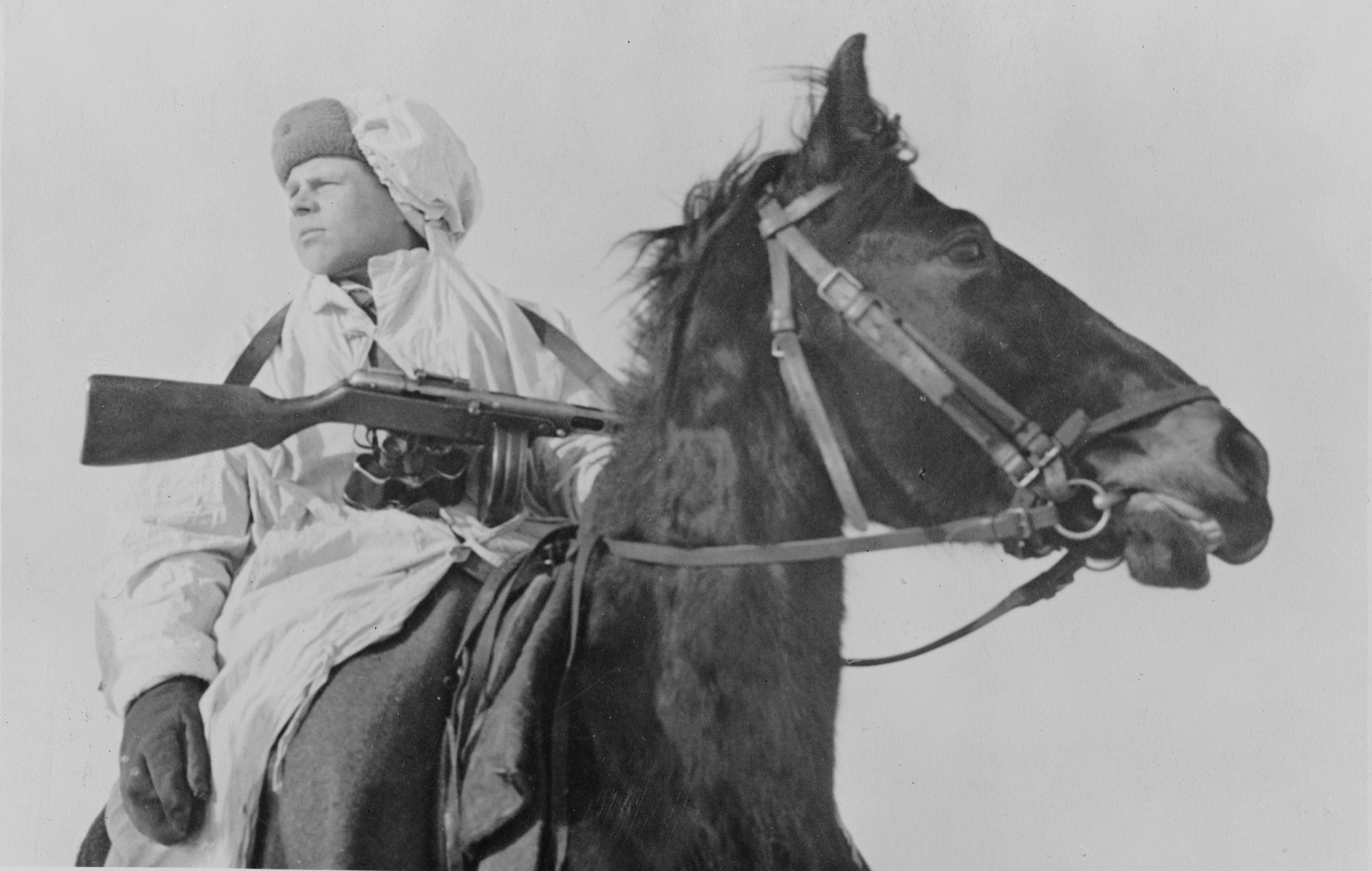
Mounted scout of the division reconnaissance company Yakov Stepanov with PPSh-41 slung over his chest, February 1942

Poirer and Connor, in their 1985 Red Army Order of Battle, say that the division fought at Yelnya, on the Dnieper River, at Uman and Targul Frumos. For its actions in the capture of Jassy, the division was awarded the Order of the Red Banner on 15 September 1944. The division was with 46th Army of the 2nd Ukrainian Front in May 1945.

== Postwar ==
The division was disbanded on 30 June 1946 in the Odessa Military District with the 34th Rifle Corps of the 40th Army.

In 1955, the division was reformed from the 318th Rifle Division with the 3rd Rifle Corps at Uzhhorod, inheriting the honorifics "Novorossiysk Order of Suvorov". On 9 September 1955, it became the 39th Mechanized Division. The division received personnel and equipment from the disbanded 13th Guards Mechanized Division in fall 1955 and on 4 December became the 39th Guards Mechanized Division.
