= Aleksei Aleksandrovich Grechkin =

Soviet army commander

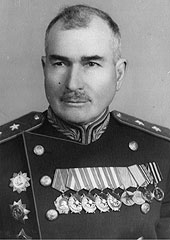
- Native name: Алексей Александрович Гречкин
- Born: 26 March 1893; Karpenka, Novouzensky Uyezd, Samara Governorate, Russian Empire
- Died: 30 August 1964 (aged 71) Moscow, Soviet Union
- Allegiance: Russian Empire Soviet Union
- Branch: Imperial Russian Army; Soviet Red Army
- Service years: 1914–1917; 1918–1954
- Rank: Lieutenant general
- Commands: 1st Division, Finnish People's Army; Operational Group, 56th Army; 318th Rifle Division; 16th Rifle Corps; 20th Rifle Corps; 9th Army; 70th Army; 28th Army; 48th Rifle Corps; 73rd Rifle Corps
- Conflicts: World War I; Russian Civil War; World War II; Winter War; Eastern Front

Aleksei Aleksandrovich Grechkin (Russian: Алексе́й Алекса́ндрович Гре́чкин, 26 March 1893 – 30 August 1964) was a Soviet army commander.

After serving in World War I as an Imperial Russian Army officer, Grechkin joined the Red Army in 1918 and fought in the Russian Civil War. He rose through the ranks in the interwar period and commanded a division in the Winter War. After the Operation Barbarossa, the German invasion of the Soviet Union, Grechkin temporarily commanded the North Caucasus Military District, and as commander of the 56th Army operational group, led troops in the Battle of Rostov. He commanded the 9th Army and the 28th Army in 1943 and was deputy commander of the 3rd Baltic Front in the summer of 1943. After the war, Grechkin successively commanded two rifle corps and the Vystrel commander improvement courses before his 1954 retirement.

== Early life, World War I, and Russian Civil War ==
Grechkin was born on 26 March 1893 in the village of Karpenka, Novouzensky Uyezd in Samara Governorate (now Krasnokutsky District, Saratov Oblast). In 1910, he graduated from a teacher's school in Dyakovka, after which Grechkin worked as a teacher. In 1914, after the beginning of World War I, Grechkin was drafted into the Imperial Russian Army, serving in the reserve battalion of the Lifeguard Izmaylovsky Regiment. At the end of May 1915, he entered the 3rd Petrograd School of Praporshchiks, graduating in August. Grechkin was promoted to praporshchik and sent to the Western Front, where he served with the 57th Infantry Division's 228th Zadonsk Infantry Regiment, involved in heavy fighting in the Osowiec Fortress area. He was later transferred with the regiment to the Romanian Front and then the Southwestern Front, where Grechkin participated in fighting in the area of the Stokhid River. He became a company commander, was elected battalion commander, and promoted to staff captain. After the Russian Revolution Grechkin became a member of the regimental committee but returned to teaching after the army's collapse.

Grechkin joined the Red Army in August 1918 and was appointed assistant commissar of the staff of the Don Soviet Republic. He subsequently fought on the Southern Front of the Russian Civil War as a battalion commander, chief of defense of Morshansky Uyezd, and commander of the reserve regiment of the 9th Kuban Army. He fought in battles with the White Army 4th Don Cavalry Corps, the elimination of Sergei Ulagay's landing force, and the suppression of partisans in the Kuban.

== Interwar period ==
After end of the war, in October 1920, Grechkin became assistant commander of the 37th Separate Rifle Brigade (later the 37th Rifle Division) in the North Caucasus Military District. He later became commander of the 111th Rifle Regiment and in June 1922 transferred to become assistant commander of the 13th Rifle Division's 37th Rifle Regiment, in the same district. In July 1923, Grechkin took command of the Rostov Separate Guard Battalion. He became assistant commander and acting commander of the 22nd Rifle Division's 64th Rifle Regiment in June 1924. After graduating from the Vystrel commander improvement courses in 1926, he was sent to the Central Asian Military District and appointed commander of the 3rd Turkestan Rifle Division's 9th Turkestan Rifle Regiment. Between April and July 1931, he led the regiment in battles with Ibrahim Bek, the leader of the Muslim Basmachi insurgent movement. In January 1932, he was transferred to become assistant commander of the 15th Rifle Division and in July 1935 became acting division commander. On 26 November, when the Red Army reintroduced regular military ranks, Grechkin became a kombrig.

In March 1936, Grechkin was appointed head of the student military training department of the Kiev Military District and in September 1938 became assistant commander of the 13th Rifle Corps. In 1939, he graduated from the Courses of Improvement for Higher Officers (KUVNAS) at the Military Academy of the General Staff, and in September fought in the Soviet invasion of Poland. At the beginning of the Winter War, Grechkin was appointed commander of the newly formed 1st Division of the Finnish People's Army, the military of the Soviet puppet Finnish Democratic Republic. He led the division during the capture of Vyborg in the spring of 1940, just before the end of the war. On 4 June, the Red Army changed its rank system, and Grechkin became a major general. In July, he was appointed assistant commander of the North Caucasus Military District for higher educational institutions.

== World War II ==
During the first months after Operation Barbarossa, the 22 June 1941 German invasion of the Soviet Union, Grechkin was tasked with organizing the construction of the Mius defensive line, which protected Rostov-on-Don. From 3 August to 4 September, he was the acting commander of the North Caucasus Military District. Grechkin became commander of the 56th Army operational group in October, leading it in the defense of Rostov, which ended in a retreat from the city. In conjunction with the 9th Army and the rest of the 56th Army, the operational group was able to recapture the city during the subsequent Rostov Offensive. He became the deputy commander of the 24th Army in June 1942 and took command of the 318th Rifle Division in August 1942.

In December, Grechkin became commander of the 16th Rifle Corps, then the landing troops of the 18th Army. During February 1943, he led the 18th Army operational group tasked with organizing and training amphibious assault troops south of Novorossiysk. In June, Grechkin was appointed commander of the 9th Army, which he led during the Novorossiysk-Taman Operation in September and October. In October, he was promoted to lieutenant general and a month later transferred to command the 28th Army, which Grechkin commanded in the Nikopol–Krivoi Rog Offensive and the Bereznegovatoye–Snigirevka Offensive.

In May 1944, he was appointed deputy commander of the 3rd Baltic Front, and in this position served in the Pskov-Ostrov Offensive. In August 1944, Grechkin was given command of a force consisting of the 128th Rifle Division and 191st Rifle Division. On 16 August, Grechkin's force landed at Mehikoorma and established a bridgehead as part of the Tartu Offensive. He subsequently participated in the Riga Offensive. In October, the front was disbanded and Grechkin was placed at the disposal of the Main Personnel Directorate of the People's Commissariat of Defense. In April he was placed at the disposal of the 1st Ukrainian Front's military council, and at the end of the war Grechkin took command of the front's 48th Rifle Corps.

== Postwar ==
After the end of the war, Grechkin continued to command the 48th Rifle Corps, which became part of the Lvov Military District. In May 1946 he took command of the 73rd Rifle Corps in the Carpathian Military District, but was relieved of command in July and from October 1946 was assistant chief of the Vystrel courses. In February 1951, he became head of the special department for accelerated training at the Military Institute of Foreign Languages, and retired in June 1954. Grechkin lived in Moscow and died there on 30 August 1964.

== Awards ==
Grechkin received the following awards:

- Order of Lenin
- Order of the Red Banner (5; 13 December 1942, 5 August 1944)
- Order of Kutuzov, 1st class
- Order of Bogdan Khmelnitsky, 1st class (19 March 1944)
- Order of Suvorov, 2nd class (6 May 1945)

Preceded by Lieutenant Colonel Aleksei Kuzmin	Commander of the 318th Rifle Division; August 28, 1942 – January 1, 1943	Succeeded by Colonel Valentin Vrutsky
Preceded by Colonel Pavel Lavrinovich	Commander of the 16th Rifle Corps; December 28, 1942 – February 5, 1943	Succeeded by Colonel Grigory Perekrestov
Preceded by	Commander of the 20th Rifle Corps; February 27, 1943 – March 26, 1943	Succeeded by Dmitry Gordeyev
Preceded by Konstantin Koroteev	Commander of the 9th Army; June 20, 1943 – November 1, 1943	Succeeded by none, army disbanded
Preceded by Vasily Gerasimenko	Commander of the 28th Army; November 30, 1943 – May 19, 1944	Succeeded by Alexander Luchinsky
