= Stimme des Stoßbrigadlers =

Volga German communist newspaper

- Cover of Stimme des Stoßbrigadlers, 7 January 1937 edition
- Publisher: Krasny Kut local committee of AUCP(b)/Krasny Kut Executive Committee
- Founded: 1932
- Ceased publication: 1937
- Political alignment: Communist
- Language: German language
- Headquarters: Krasny Kut

Stimme des Stoßbrigadlers ('Voice of the Strike Force') was a Volga German communist newspaper, published from Krasny Kut between 1932 and 1937. Stimme des Stoßbrigadlers was the joint organ of the Krasny Kut local committee of the All-Union Communist Party (bolshevik) and the Krasny Kut Executive Committee.
