= Qolqəti =

Coordinates: 40°41′N 47°28′E

- Municipality
- Location within Azerbaijan
- Country: Azerbaijan
- Rayon: Agdash

Population
  - Total: 1,083
- Time zone: UTC+4 (AZT)
  - Summer (DST): UTC+5 (AZT)

Qolqəti (also known as Kolgaty) is a village and municipality in the Agdash Rayon of Azerbaijan. It has a population of 1,329.

== See also ==
- Aşağı Qolqəti
- Yuxarı Qolqəti
