= Krasnokutsky =

Krasnokutsky (masculine), Krasnokutskaya (feminine), or Krasnokutskoye (neuter) may refer to:

- Krasnokutsky District, a district of Saratov Oblast, Russia
- Krasnokutskaya, a rural locality (a stanitsa) in Rostov Oblast, Russia
