= Karpenka, Saratov Oblast =

Karpenka Карпёнка
- Village
- Interactive map of Karpenka
- Location of Karpenka Karpenka (Saratov Oblast)
- Coordinates: 51°06′15.45″N 47°15′58.59″E
- Country: Russia
- Federal subject: Saratov Oblast
- Administrative district: Krasnokutsky District

Population (2010 Census)
  - Total: 641
  - Estimate (2010): 641 (0%)

Administrative status
  - Capital of: Krasnokutsky District

Municipal status
  - Municipal district: Lebedovskoe Municipal District
- Time zone: UTC+4 (MSK+1)
- Postal code: 413253
- OKTMO ID: 63623443106

Karpenka (Russian: Карпёнка) is a village (selo) in the Krasnokutsky District of Saratov Oblast, Russia, located on the right bank of the Yeruslan River (Volga's tributary), 123 kilometers (76 mi) southeast of Saratov, the administrative center of the oblast. Population: 641.
