= Samad Abdullayev =

Azerbaijani Red Army Starshina (1920–1943)

Samad Hamid oglu Abdullayev
- Səməd Həmid oğlu Abdullayev
- Born: 1920; Qolqəti, Azerbaijan SSR
- Died: 5 November 1943 (aged 22–23) near Kerch, Crimea Autonomous Republic, RSFSR, Soviet Union
- Military career
- Allegiance: Soviet Union
- Branch: Red Army
- Service years: 1939–1943
- Rank: Starshina
- Unit: 318th Rifle Division
- Conflicts: World War II; Battle of the Caucasus; Kerch-Eltigen Operation †
- Awards: Hero of the Soviet Union; Order of Lenin; Medal "For Courage"

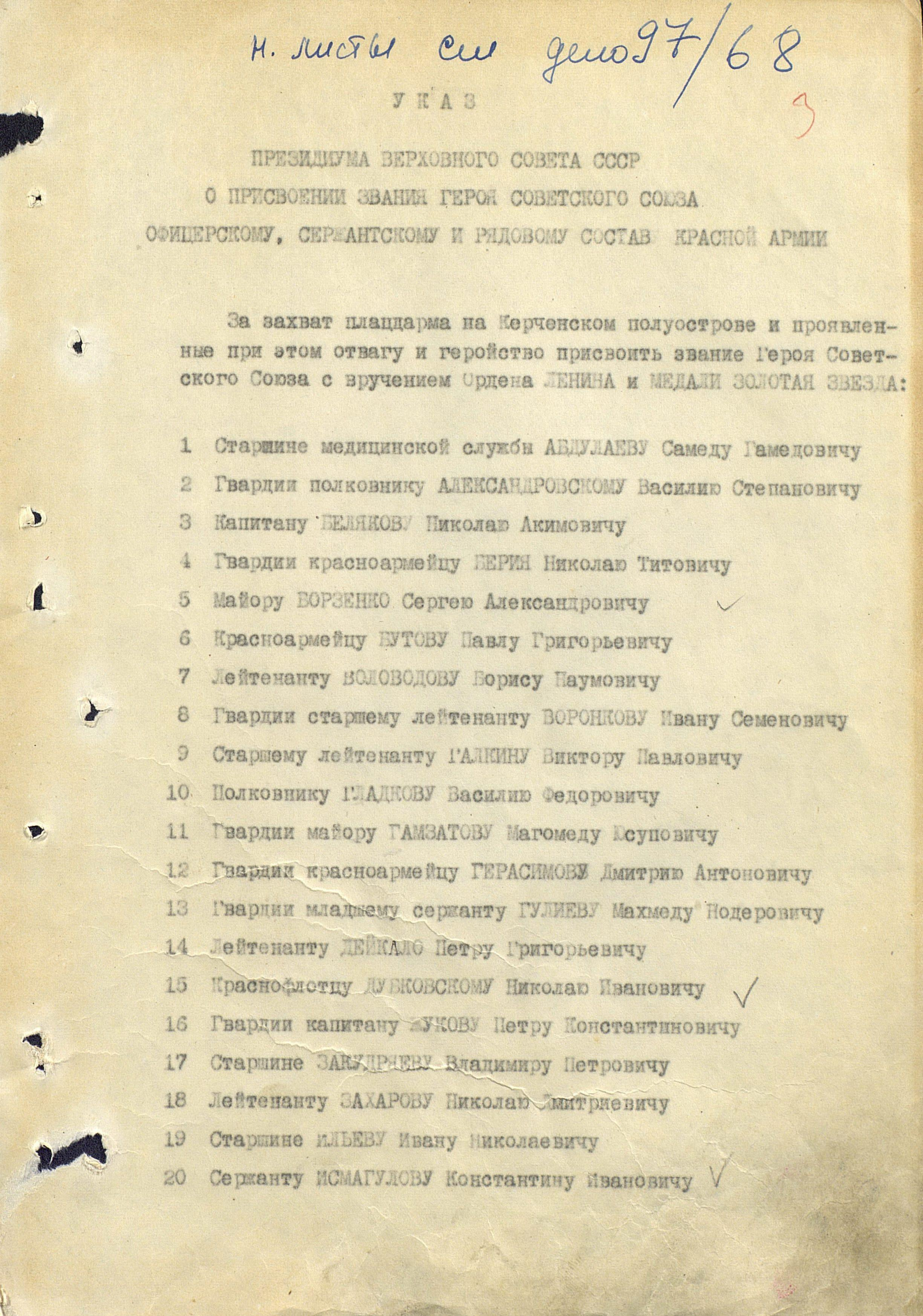

Samad Hamid oglu Abdullayev (Azerbaijani: Səməd Həmid oğlu Abdullayev; 1920 – 5 November 1943) was an Azerbaijani Red Army Starshina and a posthumous Hero of the Soviet Union. Abdullayev was posthumously awarded the title on 17 November 1943 for his actions during the Kerch–Eltigen Operation, in which he reportedly saved his commander's life on 1 November. He was killed in action four days later.

== Early life ==
Abdullayev was born in 1920 in Qolqəti to a peasant family. In 1937, he graduated from the Agdash Teacher College and worked as a teacher in the Küsnət village in Vartashen District. In 1939, he was drafted into the Red Army. Abdullayev graduated from the sanitary instructor school in Tbilisi.

== World War II ==
Abdullayev fought in the Battle of the Caucasus, the Battle of Crimea, and the Battle of Kerch Peninsula. In one action he was wounded and sent to the hospital, but soon returned to his unit. He became a battalion sanitary instructor in the 1339th Rifle Regiment of the 318th Rifle Division with the rank of Starshina. On 10 June 1943, he was awarded the Medal "For Courage" for his actions.

He fought in the Kerch-Eltigen Operation. On 1 November 1943, Abdullayev landed on the Kerch peninsula near Eltigen with his unit. Under heavy fire, he reportedly carried wounded off the battlefield, giving them treatment. During an attack, the German troops came close to the positions, Abudullayev reportedly advanced while throwing grenades, causing the German troops to retreat and saving his wounded commander. While defending the wounded, Abdullayev killed more German soldiers. On 5 November, he was killed in action. Abdullayev was buried in the village of Eltigen. On 17 November, he was awarded the title Hero of the Soviet Union and the Order of Lenin.

== Legacy ==
There is a plaque on Abdullayev's house in Agdash. A secondary school in Qolqəti is named for Abdullayev.
