= Sergey Kadanchik =

Sergey Nikolaevich Kadanchik
- Сергей Николаевич Каданчик
- Born: 12 September 1906; Moiseyevichi, Bobruysky Uyezd, Minsk Governorate, Russian Empire
- Died: 15 September 1943 (aged 37); Novorossiysk
- Military career
- Allegiance: Soviet Union
- Branch: Red Army
- Service years: 1928–1943
- Rank: Lieutenant colonel
- Unit: 318th Rifle Division
- Conflicts: World War II; Invasion of Poland; Winter War; Eastern Front; Novorossiysk Amphibious Operation
- Awards: Hero of the Soviet Union; Order of Lenin (2); Order of the Red Banner; Order of the Red Star

Sergey Nikolaevich Kadanchik (Russian: Сергей Николаевич Каданчик; 12 September 1906 – 15 September 1943) was a Belarusian Red Army lieutenant colonel and posthumous Hero of the Soviet Union. After being drafted into the Red Army in 1928, Kadanchik graduated from officer training courses and fought in the Soviet invasion of Poland and the Winter War in 1939–40. He became a regimental commander in December 1942 and in September 1943 led it during the Novorossiysk Amphibious Operation. Kadanchik was killed when a shell hit the observation post where he was positioned. For his actions, Kadanchik was posthumously awarded the title Hero of the Soviet Union.

== Early life and Interwar years ==
Kadanchik was born on 12 September 1906 in the village of Moiseyevichi in Minsk Governorate to a peasant family. He graduated from primary school and was drafted into the Red Army in 1928. In 1932, Kadanchik graduated from the Kiev United Training Courses for Red Army commanders. He fought in the Soviet invasion of Poland in September 1939 and the Winter War with Finland the following year. Kadanchik joined the Communist Party of the Soviet Union in 1940.

== World War II ==
Following the German invasion of the Soviet Union, Kadanchik fought in combat from 22 June 1941. He fought on the Southern Front, Southwestern Front, Transcaucasian Front and North Caucasian Front. On 13 December 1942, Kadanchik was appointed commander of the 1339th Rifle Regiment of the 318th Rifle Division. On 24 April 1943, he was awarded the Order of the Red Banner. During the Novorossiysk Amphibious Operation in September 1943, the regiment was to capture the area from the eastern breakwater to Staropassazhirskoy and advance to the outskirts of Mefodiyevsky.

The landing began on 9 September. Before reaching the shore, Kadanchik's boat sank after it hit a mine. He was rescued by a ship returning to Gelendzhik. Kadanchik arrived on the beachhead before the evening. Lieutenant General Ivan Petrov, commander of the North Caucasian Front, concluded that a breakthrough in the German line would be most likely to succeed in the sector assigned to Kadanchik's regiment. During the second half of 10 September the Germans brought up reinforcements, launching seven counterattacks. These were repulsed but by the evening some elements of the regiment had been pushed back to the sea. During the night German attacks forced the regiment back to the coast and it became surrounded. Kadanchik was killed on 15 September when a German shell hit the bell tower from where he was observing the fighting.

On 18 September, for actions during the Novorossiysk operation Kadanchik was awarded the title Hero of the Soviet Union and the Order of Lenin. He was buried in Gelendzhik and was reburied in a mass grave in the Heroes Square of Novorossiysk.

== Legacy ==
Streets in Novorossiysk and Osipovichi are named for Kadanchik. There is also a fishing trawler named for him, as well as a memorial plaque at the school in Moiseyevichi.
