= Crimean offensive =

1944 offensive into Crimea by the Red Army during World War II

- Part of the Eastern Front of World War II
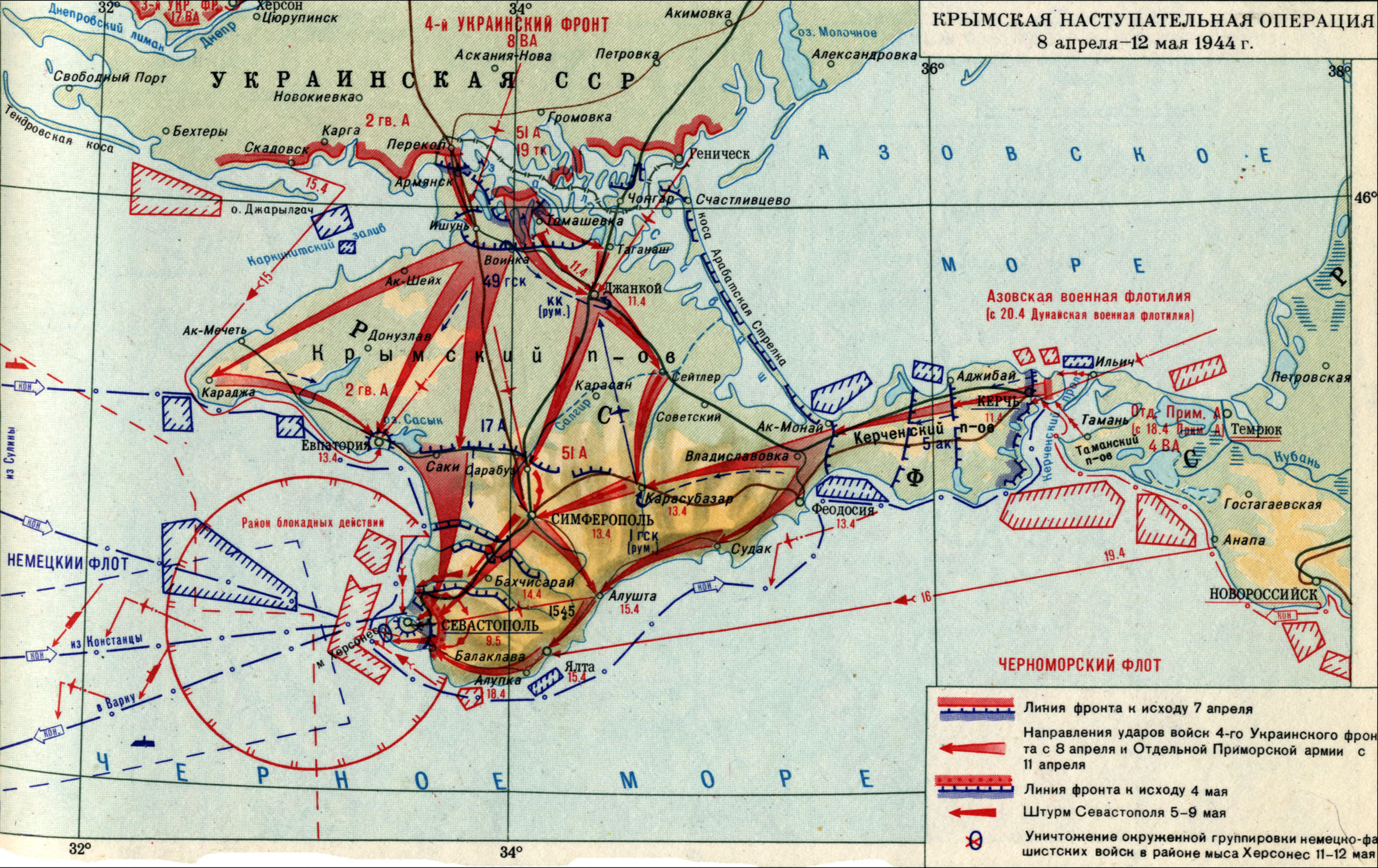
- Soviet map of the Crimean offensive
| Date | 8 April – 12 May 1944 |
| Location | Crimean ASSR, Russian SFSR, Soviet Union |
| Result | Soviet victory |

Belligerents
| Soviet Union | Germany; Romania |

Commanders and leaders
| (Soviet Union) Fyodor Tolbukhin (Soviet Union) Filipp Oktyabrskiy | (Nazi Germany) Erwin Jaenecke; Horia Macellariu |

Units involved
| 4th Ukrainian Front: 2nd Guards Army; 51st Army; Separate Coastal Army; 4th Air Army; Black Sea Fleet; Partisans | Army Group South Ukraine: 17th Army; Mountain Corps |

Strength
| 462,400 men 560 tanks and assault guns 6,000 guns 1,200 aircraft | 230,000–255,970 men: (Nazi Germany) 165,000; (Kingdom of Romania) 65,000; 1,815 guns |

Casualties and losses
| 84,839; 17,754 killed or missing 67,065 wounded or sick 171 tanks 521 guns 179 aircraft Losses at sea: 1 submarine 1 motor torpedo boat 12+ aircraft | 96,700 (Nazi Germany); 31,700 killed or missing 33,400 wounded (Kingdom of Romania); 25,800 killed or missing 5,800 wounded Losses at sea: (Nazi Germany); 4 submarine hunters 5 cargo ships 1 tanker 3 tugs 3 lighters 3 motorboats (Kingdom of Romania) 3 cargo ships |

The Crimean offensive (8 April – 12 May 1944), known in German sources as the Battle of the Crimea, was a series of offensives by the Red Army directed at the German-held Crimea. The Red Army's 4th Ukrainian Front engaged the German 17th Army of Army Group South Ukraine, which consisted of Wehrmacht and Romanian formations. The battles ended with the evacuation of Crimea by the Germans. German and Romanian forces suffered considerable losses during the evacuation.

== Prelude ==
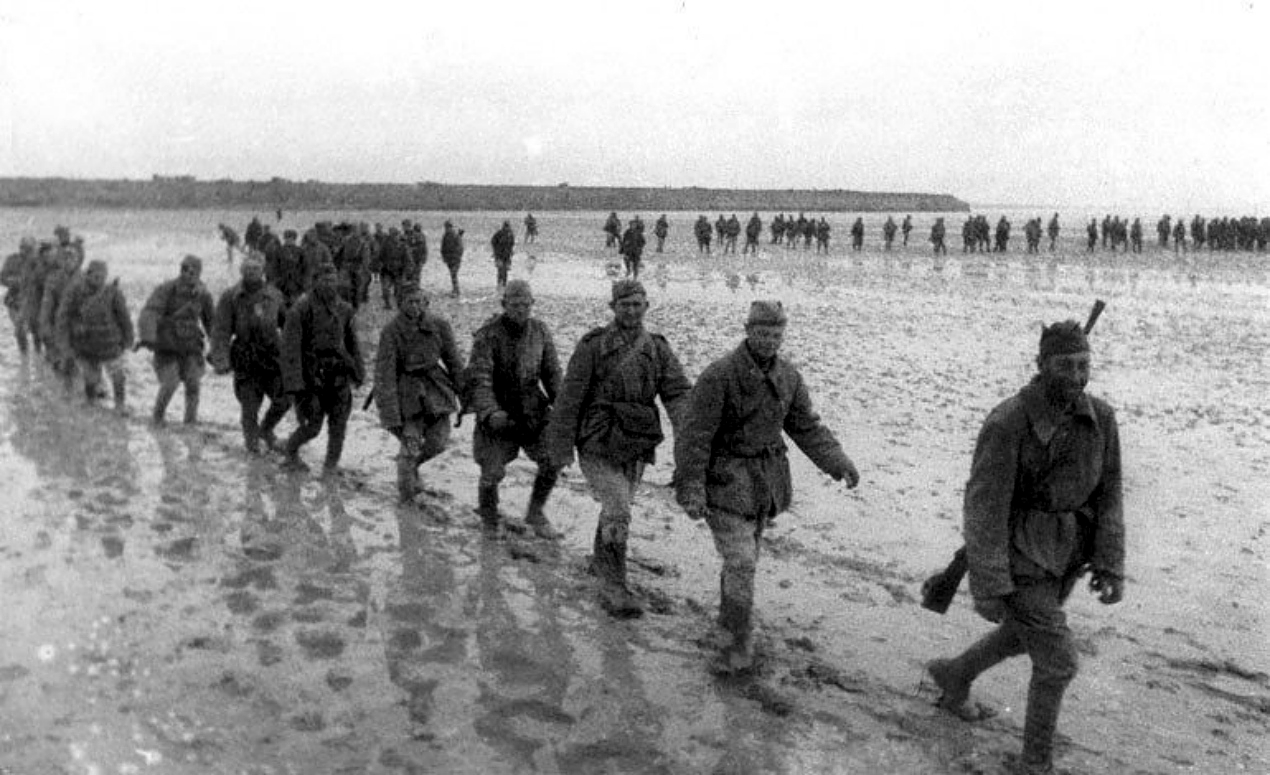
Soviet soldiers crossing Sivash Bay into Crimea in late 1943

The Germans took control of the Crimean Peninsula after the Crimean Campaign in 1942.

=== Kerch-Eltigen operation ===
During late 1943 and early 1944, the Wehrmacht was pressed back along its entire front line in the east. In October 1943, the 17th Army withdrew from the Kuban bridgehead across the Kerch Strait into the Crimea. During the following months, the Red Army pushed back the Wehrmacht in southern Ukraine, eventually cutting off the land-based connection of 17th Army through the Perekop Isthmus in November 1943.

The Wehrmacht was able to successfully hold on to Crimea even after it had been cut off by land due to their ability to supply it via the Black Sea. Holding Crimea was considered important as its loss would negatively affect the attitude of Turkey and put Romanian oilfields under risk of Soviet air attacks. Aside from Soviet landings across the Kerch Strait and in the north-eastern sector near Sivash at the end of 1943, the Soviet Army largely ignored Crimea for the next five months.

Paul Ludwig Ewald von Kleist was removed from the command of Army Group A (from April 2: "Army Group South Ukraine") on March 30, 1944. He was succeeded by Ferdinand Schörner.

== Progress of the battle ==
An assault across the Perekop Isthmus was launched on 8 April by elements of the 4th Ukrainian Front's 2nd Guards and 51st Armies. The 17th Army defended but was unable to stop the advance. Kerch was reached by the Separate Coastal Army on 11 April; Simferopol, about 37 mi (60 km) northeast of Sevastopol, followed two days later. The 17th Army was retreating toward Sevastopol by 16 April, with remaining Axis forces in Crimea concentrating around the city by the end of the third week of April.

The OKH intended to hold Sevastopol as a fortress, as the Red Army had done during the first Crimean campaign in 1941–42. However, the fortifications of the city had never been restored and Sevastopol was not the strong defensive position that it had been in 1941. Fighting broke out in the city outskirts towards the end of April and the city fell on 9 May, less than a month after the start of the offensive. The Axis sea evacuation to Constanța was attacked by Soviet land-based bombers.

=== Evacuation of Crimea ===
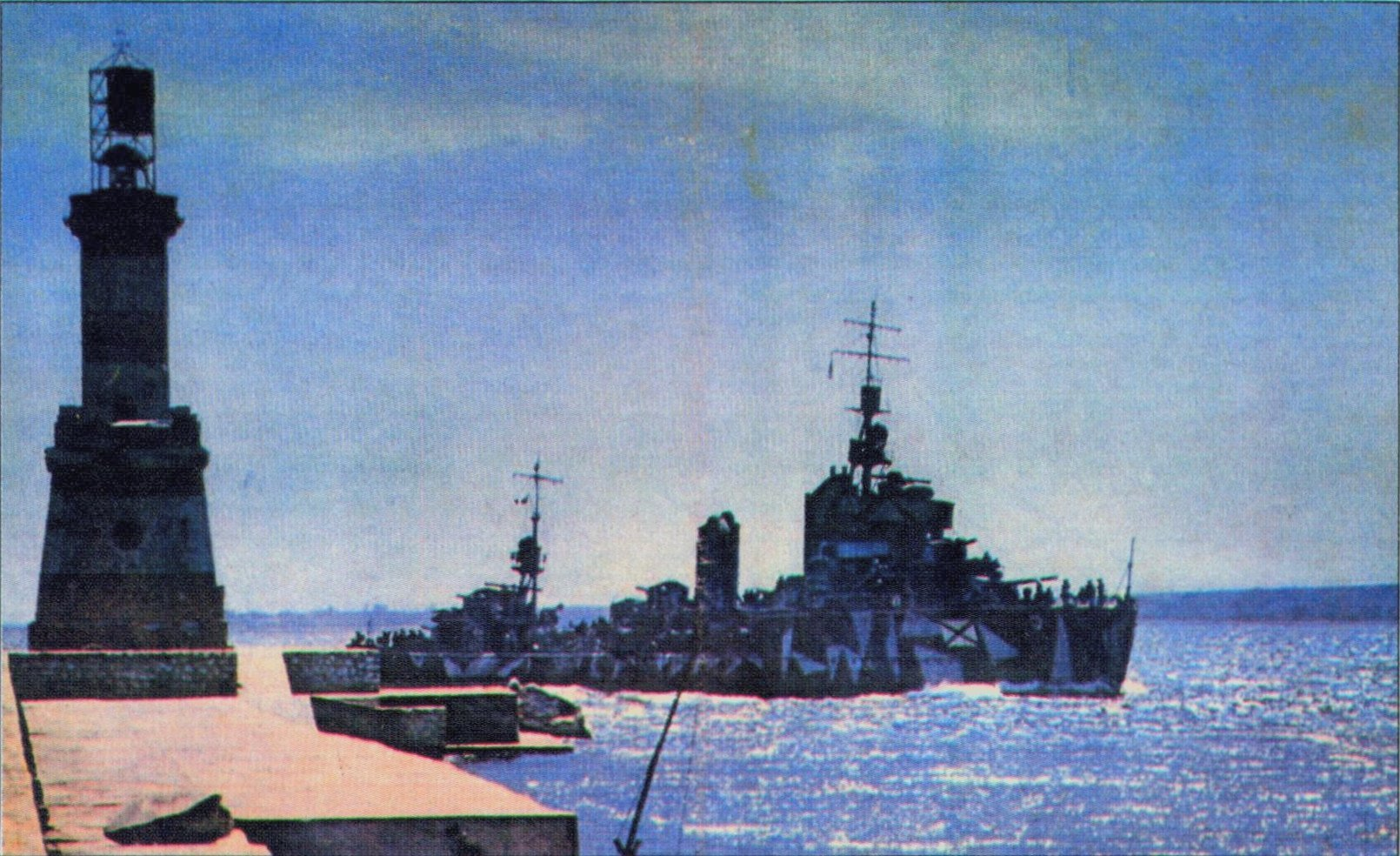
Romanian destroyer Regele Ferdinand

The evacuation of Crimea in April–May 1944, under the code name Operation 60,000 after the estimated number of Romanian soldiers in Crimea (around 62,000-65,000), was the most complex and extensive operation of the Romanian Navy during the Second World War. From 15 April to 14 May, numerous German and Romanian warships escorted many convoys between Constanța and Sevastopol. The scale and importance of the operation can be attested by the usage in combat of all four Romanian destroyers, the largest Axis warships in the Black Sea. The last phase of the evacuation (10–14 May) saw the fiercest combat, as Axis ships transported, under constant attacks from Soviet aircraft and shore artillery, over 30,000 troops. Of these, 18,000 were transported by Romanian ships. On 11 May, the German tanker Friederike was torpedoed and heavily damaged by Soviet submarine L-4, preventing her participation.

In total, Romanian and German convoys evacuated over 113,000 Axis troops from the Crimea, most of them (over 63,000) during the first phase of the evacuation (15–25 April). No Romanian Navy warships were lost during the evacuation, however the destroyer Regele Ferdinand came close to being sunk. She was struck by a large aerial bomb, which fell in her fuel tanks, but failed to detonate. The bomb was extracted several days after the end of the operation. Two naval actions involving the Romanian Navy took place during the second phase of the evacuation (25 April–10 May), near Sevastopol. On 18 April, the Soviet Leninets-class submarine L-6 was twice attacked with depth charges and damaged by the Romanian gunboat Ghiculescu, numerous bubbles emerged from the depths after each attack, before being finished off by the German submarine hunter UJ-104.

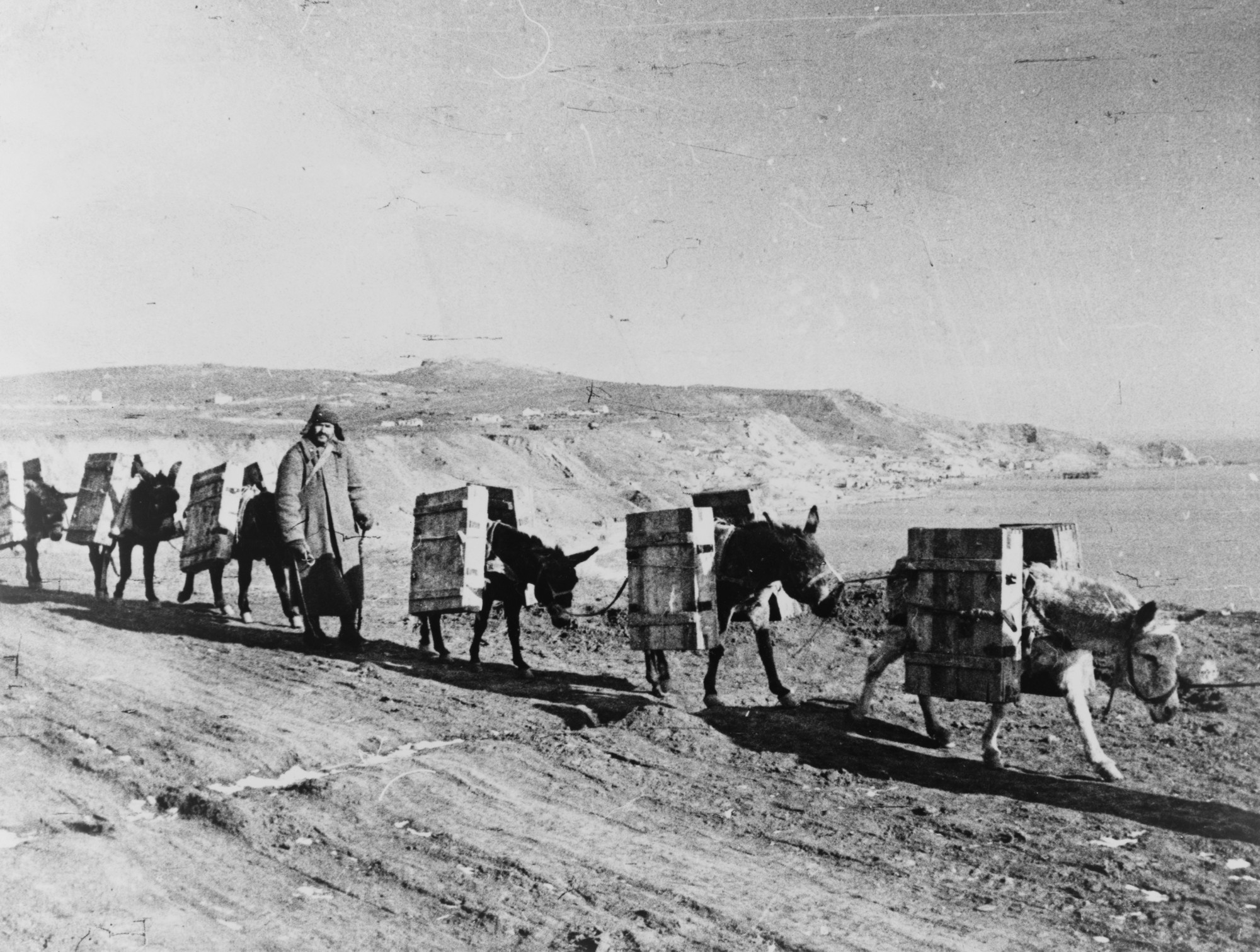
Pack donkeys of the Soviet 3rd Mountain Rifle Corps delivering ammunition to the frontline on the Kerch peninsula, April 1944

During the night of 27 April, a convoy escorted by the Romanian gunboat Ghiculescu, the German submarine hunter UJ-115, one R-boat, two KFK naval trawlers and 19 MFPs (including the Romanian PTA-404 and PTA-406) engaged the Soviet G-5-class motor torpedo boats TKA-332, TKA-343 and TKA-344, after the three attacked and damaged the German submarine hunter UJ-104. Ghiculescu opened fire with tracer rounds, enabling the entire escort group to locate the two Soviet MTBs and open fire. TKA-332 was hit and sunk. Over 12 Soviet aircraft were also shot down during the evacuation, including two by the minelaying destroyer escort Amiral Murgescu. The last Axis pockets in Crimea were destroyed on 12 May. The last Axis warship to leave the peninsula was Amiral Murgescu, carrying on board 1,000 Axis troops, including the German General Walter Hartmann.

== Consequences ==
In a meeting with Adolf Hitler in Berchtesgaden, 17th Army commander Erwin Jaenecke had insisted that Sevastopol should be evacuated and his cut off Army of 235,000 men withdrawn. After the loss of the Crimea, he was held responsible, arrested in Romania and court-martialed. Only the intervention of Heinz Guderian saved his life. He was dismissed from the army on 31 January 1945.

The German and Romanian formations suffered the loss of 57,000 men, many of whom drowned during the evacuation. The sinking of the Totila and Teja on 10 May alone caused up to 10,000 deaths. In total, the German losses at sea amounted to five cargo ships, one tanker, three tugs, three lighters, three motorboats and four submarine hunters, while the Romanians lost three cargo ships. The partially successful evacuation of Axis troops from Crimea earned the commander of the Romanian Navy, Rear Admiral Horia Macellariu, the Knight's Cross of the Iron Cross.

Between April 14 and May 13, 1944, a total of 120,853 men and 22,548 tons of cargo were evacuated by sea from the Crimea:

- 36,557 Romanians, of whom 4,262 were wounded
- 58,486 Germans, of whom 12,027 were wounded
- 723 Slovaks
- 15,391 Soviet volunteers
- 2,581 prisoners of war
- 7,115 civilians

In Soviet propaganda, this offensive was listed as one of Stalin's ten blows.

The table below is based on information from Glantz/House When Titans Clashed.:

Axis losses

German:
Killed and missing: 31,700
Wounded: 33,400
Total: 65,100

Romanian:
Killed and missing: 25,800
Wounded: 5,800
Total: 31,600

Total:
Killed and missing: 57,500
Wounded: 39,200
Total: 96,700

Soviet losses

Killed and missing: 17,754
Wounded: 67,065
Total: 84,819

Tanks: 171
Artillery: 521
Aircraft: 179

== Land formations and units involved ==
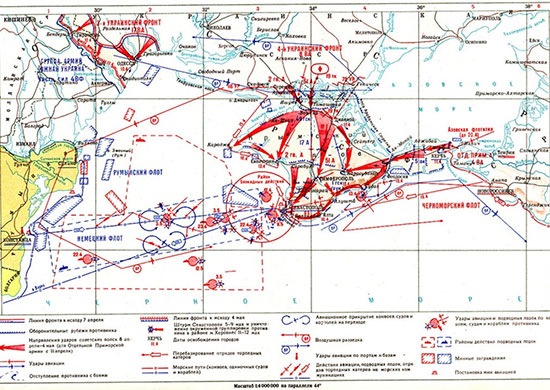
Actions of the Black Sea Fleet during the Crimean Strategic Offensive Operation.

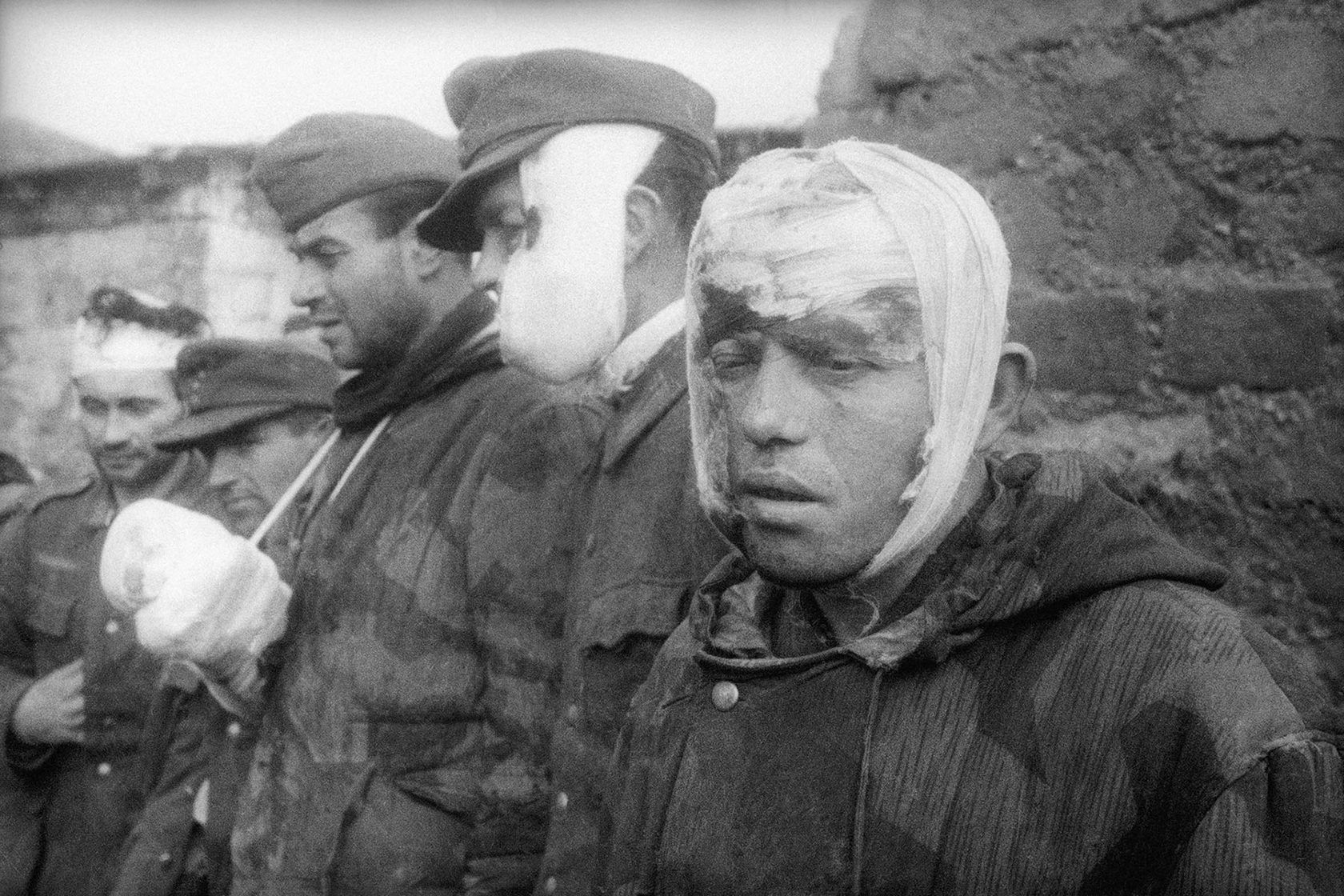
Wounded German soldiers captured during the liberation of Sevastopol

=== Soviet ===
- 4th Ukrainian Front
  - 2nd Guards Army
  - 51st Army
  - 4th Air Army
- Black Sea Fleet
- Separate Coastal Army
- Partisans

=== Axis ===
==== German ====
- Army Group A
  - 17th Army

==== Romanian ====
- Romanian Mountain Corps
  - 1st Mountain Division
  - 2nd Mountain Division

== Bibliography ==
- Clodfelter, M. (2017). Warfare and Armed Conflicts: A Statistical Encyclopedia of Casualty and Other Figures, 1492–2015 (4th ed.). Jefferson, North Carolina: McFarland. ISBN 978-0786474707.
- Frieser, Karl-Heinz; Schmider, Klaus; Schönherr, Klaus; Schreiber, Gerhard; Ungváry, Kristián; Wegner, Bernd (2007). Das Deutsche Reich und der Zweite Weltkrieg: Die Ostfront 1943/44 – Der Krieg im Osten und an den Nebenfronten [Germany and the Second World War: The Eastern Front 1943–1944: The War in the East and on the Neighbouring Fronts] (in German). Vol. VIII. München: Deutsche Verlags-Anstalt. ISBN 978-3-421-06235-2.
- Glantz, David M.; House, Jonathan (1995). When Titans clashed: How the Red Army stopped Hitler. Lawrence, Kansas: University Press of Kansas. ISBN 0-7006-0899-0.
- Ziemke, E.F. Stalingrad to Berlin
- Müller, Rolf-Dieter (2005). Der letzte deutsche Krieg, 1939-1945. Stuttgart: Klett-Cotta. ISBN 3-608-94133-9.
