= 318th Rifle Division =

318th Rifle Division (June 15, 1942 – August 15, 1944) 318th Mountain Rifle Division (August 15, 1944 – 1954) 318th Rifle Division (1954–1955)
- Active: 1942–1955
- Country: Soviet Union
- Branch: Red Army
- Type: Infantry
- Size: Division
- Engagements: Battle of the Caucasus; Battle of Novorossiysk; Taman Peninsula; Kerch–Eltigen Operation; Crimean Campaign; Prague Offensive
- Decorations: Order of Suvorov 2nd Class
- Battle honours: Novorossiysk

Commanders
- Notable commanders: Col. Anatolii Nikolaevich Chervinskii; Maj. Gen. Aleksei Aleksandrovich Grechkin; Col. Valentin Apollinarovich Vrutzkii; Maj. Gen. Vasilii Fyodorovich Gladkov

The 318th Rifle Division began forming on June 15, 1942, in and near Novorossiysk on the coast of the Black Sea, as a standard Red Army rifle division; it was later re-formed as a mountain rifle division, but exactly when this happened is disputed among the various sources. It fought in the area it was formed in until September 1943, and was granted the name of this city as an honorific. In November of that year it took part in the largest Soviet amphibious operation of the war, across the Kerch Straits into the easternmost part of the Crimea, but its small beachhead was eliminated some weeks later. After the Crimea was liberated in May 1944, it remained there for several months before it was transferred to the Carpathian Mountains west of Ukraine as a mountain division, and spent the remainder of the war fighting through Czechoslovakia in the direction of Prague. The division continued to serve postwar in this same role, but was converted back to a standard rifle division before it was disbanded in the early 1950s.

== 78th Naval Rifle Brigade ==
The precursor to this division formed from October to December 1941 at Novorossiysk in the North Caucasus Military District. It was based on personnel taken from the Black Sea Fleet and the naval schools. It was eventually commanded by Col. Anatolii Nikolaevich Chervinskii, who had previously led the 164th Rifle Division but was tried and convicted of negligence in October. Late in the year it was shipped to Southern Front where it served in both the 56th and 9th Armies. By late spring of 1942 it was being referred to as a regular rifle brigade, probably indicating it had lost most of its naval cadre in the winter fighting. It June it returned to Novorossiysk.

== Formation ==
The division started forming on June 15, 1942, in the North Caucasus Military District, based on the 78th Rifle Brigade and the 165th Reserve Rifle Regiment. at and near Novorossiysk. Colonel Chervinskii remained in command but he went missing in action soon after the division entered the fighting in July. Two other officers were appointed in quick succession, until Maj. Gen. Aleksei Aleksandrovich Grechkin took command on August 28. The division's main order of battle was as follows:

- 1331st Rifle Regiment
- 1337th Rifle Regiment
- 1339th Rifle Regiment
- 796th Artillery Regiment
- 433rd Antitank Battalion

The division was formed in 9th Army, but immediately went into the reserves of North Caucasus Front, and then into the Transcaucasus Front. As of September 4, while most of the division remained in Front reserves, the 1331st Rifle Regiment was detached to 18th Army in the Black Sea Group of Forces. On September 22, just before the German 17th Army began its offensive towards Tuapse, the 318th was in 47th Army, facing the German V Army Corps and the Romanian Cavalry Corps; it remained under this command until after the German offensive ended in November. On the first day of the new year General Grechkin was succeeded in command by Col. Valentin Apollinarovich Vrutzkii.

== Battle of Novorossiysk ==
After months of stalemate, the battle for the Black Sea port of Novorossiysk began to come to a head on September 9, 1943. By this time all of the 318th was in 18th Army, which was commanded by Col. Gen. K.N. Leselidze. Following a fifteen-minute artillery bombardment and an advance guard of marines, the 1339th Rifle Regiment, commanded by Lt. Col. S.N. Kadanchik:

"...descended upon the Tsementnaya wharf. And although not all the regiment managed to land, the men who did get a hold on the shore attacked the enemy fortifications in a massive rush. By dawn they had seized an important strongpoint -- the Proletary cement works. The rest of the regiment joined them the following night."

On his way in, Kadanchik's boat sank after hitting a mine, but he was rescued by a ship returning from the landings and he reached his regiment later that day. The 1339th came under massive pressure from German counterattacks over the next 24 hours which pushed some elements back to the sea, but eventually they held. Kadanchik was killed on September 15 by German artillery, and was posthumously made a Hero of the Soviet Union three days later. Meanwhile, other elements of the division were entering the battle.

"On the second night the 1337th Regiment went ashore near the power station. Col. V. A. Vrutzkii, commanding the 318th Rifle Division, landed together with the regiment but contact with him was lost... Leselidze decided to send a senior officer [with another officer] to the power station area to find Vrutzkii...and report back immediately... Despite the danger they returned... They also brought sad news: Col. Vrutzkii had suffered severe concussion, lost an eye and been wounded in the arm. Steps were immediately taken to help the division's units which were making slow but sure headway. The divisional commander's duties were temporarily entrusted to the divisional Chief of Staff."

Shortly afterwards further news was received that Lt. Col. A. Tikhostup, the division's political department head, had been killed. When Novorossiysk was finally liberated on September 16, the division was awarded its name as an honorific:

"NOVOROSSIYSK"...318th Mountain Rifle Division, Col. V. A. Vrutzkii (until September 11); and Col. M. V. Yevstigneev... The troops who participated in the liberation of Novorossiysk, by the order of the Supreme High Command of September 16, 1943, and a commendation in Moscow, are given a salute of 12 artillery salvoes from 124 guns.

Colonel Yevstigneev held command for only a few days, until replaced by Col. Vasilii Fyodorovich Gladkov; this officer would be promoted to Major General on June 3, 1944, would go on to be named a Hero of the Soviet Union, and would remain in command for the duration of the war.

Even before the liberation of Novorossiysk, Axis forces had begun evacuating the Taman Peninsula across the Kerch Strait into the Crimea in what was called Operation Brunhild. On September 20, the 318th came under the command of Col. (later Maj. Gen.) Vasilii Fyodorovich Gladkov, a post he would hold well into the postwar era. On the following day the division liberated Anapa, and soon began preparing its own crossing of the strait.

== Kerch–Eltigen Operation ==
The Kerch-Eltigen landing operation began overnight on October 31/November 1, 1943, when the three rifle regiments of the 318th, supported by the 386th Naval Infantry Battalion and the fire of 50 howitzers of 18th Army on the lower Taman peninsula, embarked for the sandy beaches at Eltigen, south of Kerch. The main landing by 56th Army east of Kerch was delayed for two nights. The crossing was carried out using a vast assortment of fishing boats, tug boats, barges and other assorted craft. These encountered at least two German naval minefields which sank several vessels, killing over 200 troops, including the commander of the 1337th Rifle Regiment and most of his staff. Surprisingly, the explosions did not alert the defenders' coastal artillery. Around 0330hrs. the beach area was strafed and bombed by Soviet aircraft, then at 0420hrs. the artillery support group began a 35-minute preparation. The first vessels approached the beaches at 0450hrs and began unloading; due to the presence of a sandbar 50 metres from shore, many heavily laden soldiers quickly found themselves well over their heads and drowned. There was no resistance from the beach's defenders, who seemed unaware that anything was happening for at least 15 minutes, but the surf was rough and made landing difficult. By the end of this first night the three regiments were ashore with the following strengths:

- 1331st Rifle Regiment - 301 men
- 1337th Rifle Regiment - 481 men
- 1339th Rifle Regiment - 848 men

One of the men who landed that night was Starshina Samad Abdullayev, a battalion sanitary instructor in the 1339th Rifle Regiment, who was killed in action on November 5, and was posthumously made a Hero of the Soviet Union 12 days later for his actions in the beachhead fighting.

The division lost many men and a good deal of equipment, including heavy weapons such as antitank guns and mortars, which would make it impossible to break out of the beachhead. In addition, about one-third of the transport vessels had been sunk. Nevertheless, the Soviets managed to land enough troops to secure a lodgment, and also overran two Romanian 75mm guns at the northern end. The senior officer was Major D.S. Koveshnikov, although initially he had no communications with the divisional headquarters across the strait, or to his subordinate units. On the German side, the landing was assumed to be a battalion-sized diversion. Once the scale of the landing was understood and a sufficient force was gathered for a counterattack, Koveshnikov had established radio contact with the artillery on the far shore, which forced the Germans to break off late in the afternoon. Overnight, Colonel Gladkov, with another 3,200 troops and nine mortars, were landed.

At dawn on November 2 the beachhead was about 2 km wide and less than 1 km deep. Counterattacks by the German 98th Infantry Division, with armor and some air support, reduced its area by about half, but once again the Soviet artillery support from across the strait cost the Germans significant casualties, and they were also outnumbered by the Soviet troops in the beachhead. That night the main landing by 56th Army finally began at Yenikale. In an effort to make more troops available to contest this landing, the Germans and Romanians developed a plan to crush the Eltigen beachhead. Operation Komet on November 7 was an utter failure, but led to several consequences. First, the German Navy forces in the Crimea were finally persuaded to take part in the battle, seriously interfering in resupply missions to the beachhead. Second, the Soviet command recognized the beachhead was a tactical dead-end, and ceased plans to reinforce it. During the rest of November the 318th was contained by Romanian troops and allowed to wither on the vine.

By early December the Axis command decided to finally eliminate the beachhead. Due to the partial blockade, Gladkov's troops had limited ammunition and had been on short rations for weeks. The attack opened at 0500hrs. on December 4, led by a Romanian cavalry and a mountain infantry division backed by German armor and aircraft. The mountain infantry gained ground in the south, and over the next two days rolled up the beachhead from this direction. On the night of December 6/7, Gladkov made the desperate decision to break out to the north towards Kerch. A group of more than 1,500 men broke clean through the enemy perimeter and began trekking north more than 17 km. In the morning the beachhead was completely overrun and the Romanians took 2,294 prisoners, mostly from the 318th. Gladkov's group was too exhausted to break through to friendly lines, and gathered in a perimeter on the shoreline east of Mount Mithridat, hoping for rescue. They were soon penned in by the Romanian mountain troops and pounded by German artillery and aircraft over the next four days. Gladkov and some of his men escaped by sea, but the position was overrun on December 11, with another 820 men taken prisoner.

From February 1944, the rebuilding division was part of 3rd Mountain Rifle Corps in the Separate Coastal Army in its bridgehead east of Kerch, and served under those commands during the Crimean Campaign in April and May.

=== Re-formation as Mountain Division ===
While the division had served in the Caucasus and in 3rd Mountain Rifle Corps in the Crimea as a regular rifle division, it was often referred to as a mountain rifle division, and has been since, in spite of not being organized as such. On August 15, 1944, the 318th was officially converted to the 318th Mountain Rifle Division, with the following order of battle:

- 1331st Mountain Rifle Regiment
- 1337th Mountain Rifle Regiment
- 1339th Mountain Rifle Regiment
- 796th Mountain Artillery Regiment
- 443rd Antitank Battalion

The artillery regiment had two battalions with one battery of 76mm mountain guns and two batteries of 120mm mortars each, while the third battalion had one battery of each. The rifle regiments each had only two battalions with three companies each, averaging 150 men or more per company with a special organization for mountain warfare. In addition, each battalion had a company of 82mm mortars, and another of antitank rifles, and the rifle regiments had a battery each of 107mm mountain mortars for additional support.

In order to fully confirm to the shtat for a Soviet mountain division, the 318th should have been assigned one more rifle regiment. Given the sequence of the numbers of the division's regiments, this would logically have been either the 1333rd or the 1335th. While there is no positive identification of a fourth regiment from either Soviet or German sources, neither of these numbers were used for rifle regiments in any other divisions.

== Into Slovakia and postwar ==
While the 318th was converting to its new role, 3rd Mountain Corps was reassigned to 18th Army, which was moving to join 4th Ukrainian Front in the Carpathian Mountains. It spent the duration of the war under these commands, fighting through Slovakia in the general direction of the Czechoslovak capital of Prague.

By the end of the war, the men and women of the division had earned the full title of 318th Mountain Rifle, Novorossiisk, Order of Suvorov Division (Russian: 318-я горнострелковая Новороссийская ордена Суворова дивизия). In the immediate aftermath, the division served in the 38th Army's 3rd Mountain Rifle Corps in the Carpathian Military District at Mukachevo. In 1954, the division was converted into an infantry division along with the corps, and in 1955 became the 53rd Rifle Division. The division was relocated to Uzhhorod. On 9 September 1955, it became the 39th Mechanized Division. The division received personnel and equipment from the disbanded 13th Guards Mechanized Division in fall 1955 and on 4 December became the 39th Guards Mechanized Division. The new division inherited the 13th Guards' honorifics "Poltava Order of Lenin Twice Red Banner Orders of Suvorov and Kutuzov".
