= MS Totila =

German cargo ship

History

Nazi Germany
- Name: Totila
- Namesake: Totila
- Acquired: Spring 1944
- In service: May 1944
- Fate: Sunk 10 May 1944

General characteristics
- Displacement: 3600 tons
- Propulsion: 4 Ganz-Jendrasik 8cyl. 4stroke diesel engines, 4 generators, 2 electric motors
- Armament: 3 × 3.7 cm (1.46 in) and 6 × 2 cm (0.79 in) AA guns

Totila was a German cargo ship which was sunk during World War II on 10 May 1944 near Khersones during the Axis evacuation of the Crimea, killing up to 5,000 German and Romanian soldiers.

Totila was built in 1942 as the Hungarian cargo ship Magyar Vitez. The Germans confiscated her in 1944.

In 1944, the German Army′s 17th Army was cut off by the Soviet Red Army in the Crimean Peninsula. At first, Adolf Hitler did not allow the 17th Army's 235,000 German and Romanian troops to be evacuated by sea, but on 11 April 1944 the evacuation began.

Together with the ship Teja, Totila reached Khersones on 10 May 1944 and both ships were immediately loaded with German and Romanian soldiers. They then headed for Constanța, Romania. They survived a first attack by a formation of 20 Soviet aircraft, but at 09:30, Totila was hit by three bombs during a second attack by 21 Soviet planes. The ship, with 3,000 Germans and 2,000 Romanians on board, sank very quickly. Teja and the escort ships could not stop to help the survivors. At 14:45, a new formation of 11 Soviet A-20s appeared and hit Teja, which sank with some 4,000 men on board. The three escort ships saved some 400 men and continued the trip to Constanța.

The exact number of casualties will never be known, but the sinking of these two ships is one of the greatest maritime disasters of all time. In total, some 8,000 men might have lost their lives in this incident.

Divers found the wreck of Totila in May 2003 near Sevastopol.
