= Aleksi Inauri =

KGB officer

- ალექსი ინაური

Chairman of the Committee for State Security of the Georgian SSR
- In office 26 March 1954 – 2 December 1988
- Preceded by: Himself (as Minister of Internal Affairs of the Georgian SSR )
- Succeeded by: Givi Gumbaridze

Minister of Internal Affairs of the Georgian SSR
- In office 20 July 1953 – 26 March 1954
- Preceded by: Vladimir Dekanozov
- Succeeded by: Vladimer Djandjgava

Personal details
- Born: 12 May 1908 Gori, Russian Empire
- Died: 23 June 1993 (aged 85) Tbilisi, Georgia
- Party: Communist Party of the Soviet Union
- Awards: Hero of the Soviet Union

Military service
- Allegiance: Soviet Union
- Years of service: 1927-1988
- Rank: Colonel general
- Commands: 18th Mechanized Division; 9th Motor Rifle Division; 3rd Rifle Corps
- Battles/wars: World War II

Aleksi Inauri (Georgian: ალექსი ინაური; Russian: Алексей Николаевич Инаури, Aleksey Nikolayevich Inauri) (May 12, 1908 – June 23, 1993) was a Soviet commander who headed the Georgian KGB (Committee for State Security) for over 30 years (1954–1988) and made it one of the most effective of the KGB's regional Soviet branches. He ended his career as a colonel general and a Hero of the Soviet Union.

== Early life and career ==
Born in Gori (then under the Russian Empire), Inauri was a worker until volunteering, in 1926, in the Red Army and graduated from a Cavalry School for the North Caucasian Mountainous Nationalities in Krasnodar in 1931. From April 1931, he commanded a cavalry platoon and then a squadron of the 16th Cavalry Regiment, 3rd Cavalry Division of the Ukrainian Military District. He became a member of the Communist Party of the Soviet Union in 1932. From October 1936, Inauri was put in charge of the regimental schools for the same division, later in 1938 as assistant commander for the commanding officer. Before the outbreak of war, Inauri commanded the same division's 99th Cavalry Regiment as a major in the Kiev Special Military District.

== World War II ==
From June 1941 to January 1942, lieutenant colonel Inauri led the 99th Cavalry Regiment into combat. The cavalrymen under his command excelled in mid-January 1942 during the Second Battle of Kharkov, which led to another promotion on May 6 of the same year. From August 1942 to the end of the war, Inauri commanded the 1st Cavalry Division of the 15th Cavalry Corps, Transcaucasus Front, stationed in Iran. Due to outstanding performance, Inauri was promoted to major general by the resolution of the Council of People's Commissars of the USSR.

== Post war ==
Inauri continued service as a commander of a cavalry division till 1946. In 1948 he graduated from the Voroshilov General Staff Academy and took charge of the 18th Mechanized Division as part of the Soviet occupation forces in Germany. In 1951 he commanded the 9th Rifle Division and in February 1953 he took command over the 3rd Mountain Rifle Corps of the Carpathian Military District. In 1954, Inauri was made head of the Georgian KGB, a post that he retained until 1986. Later in 1957, he was promoted to lieutenant general. His tenure coincided with a series of upheavals, including the 1956 uprising, and rise of anti-Soviet dissident groups in Georgia to which Inauri was able to respond vigorously due largely to a strict discipline imposed by him within the KGB and a large web of espionage through which Inauri's agents infiltrated dissident groups and even the Georgian Orthodox Church. He played a key role in a palace coup against Nikita Khrushchev in October 1964, escorting the Soviet leader from his dacha at Pitsunda to a special meeting of the Presidium of the Central Committee in Moscow where Khrushchev was to be ousted. Inauri was promoted to the rank of colonel general in 1967 and awarded the title of the Hero of the Soviet Union in 1985, before his retirement later in 1988. From 1984 to 1989, Inauri was a member of the Supreme Soviet of the Soviet Union.
