= 262nd Rifle Division =

WWII Red Army unit

- Active: July 1941–1946
- Country: Soviet Union
- Branch: Red Army
- Type: Rifle division
- Engagements: World War II
- Decorations: Order of the Red Banner; Order of Suvorov 2nd class
- Battle honours: Demidov; Khingan

The 262nd Rifle Division (Russian: 262-я стрелковая дивизия) was an infantry division of the Red Army during World War II.

Formed as an NKVD unit in mid-1941, the division saw its first combat on the Northwestern Front at Staraya Russa and in the Valdai Hills. It was transferred to the Kalinin Front for the Soviet counteroffensive in the Battle of Moscow in late 1941. The 262nd remained in the Kalinin area until 1943, when it was moved to the Demidov area to fight in the Battle of Smolensk later that year. After the Battle of Smolensk, the division advanced west into eastern Belarus, and fought near Vitebsk in late 1943. In June 1944 it broke through the German lines around that city during Operation Bagration, and advanced into Lithuania during the summer. The division moved into East Prussia in early 1945, fighting in the East Prussian Offensive and the Battle of Königsberg. In April, it was withdrawn from the front and relocated to Mongolia in May and June to fight in the Soviet invasion of Manchuria, which began in early August. After the end of the invasion, the division garrisoned Port Arthur until its disbandment in the summer of 1946.

== History ==
=== World War II ===
The 262nd Rifle Division began forming at Vladimir in the Moscow Military District as the 16th NKVD Mountain Division on 26 June 1941. It used 1,500 NKVD troops as a cadre, and was transferred to the Red Army as the 262nd Rifle Division before 10 July. It included the 940th, 945th, and the 950th Rifle Regiments, the 788th Artillery Regiment, a separate communications company (later the 684th Communications Battalion from 1944), the 315th Anti-Tank Battalion, 428th Sapper Battalion, and 337th Reconnaissance Company. NKVD officer Major General Mikhail Kleshnin took command of the division at Vladimir. Without completing its formation, on the night of 19–20 July the division was moved to the Mozhaysk area as part of the Reserve Front's 33rd Army. A week later it was transferred to the Northwestern Front's 34th Army. The 262nd was holding positions southwest of Lake Ilmen by 1 August with the 34th Army. Later that month, it suffered heavy losses in the Staraya Russa counterattack, and Kleshnin was relieved of command in September and demoted to regimental command in another division.

On 19 September, its first Red Army commander, Colonel Matvey Tereshchenko, was assigned. At the time the 262nd was defending positions in the Valdai Hills. In the second half of October, it moved east to the Kalinin Front's 31st Army, which was preparing for the Soviet winter counteroffensive in the Battle of Moscow. The division fought in the Kalinin Defensive Operation and the Kalinin Offensive during the winter campaign. During the latter on 21 December, during the battle for Pushkino, Tereshchenko was killed in action while organizing his troops for an attack. He was replaced by division chief of staff Colonel Vladimir Gorbachyov. The division spent most of the winter of 1941–1942 with the front's 39th Army.

Major General Zakhary Usachyov took command on 26 June 1943, when the division was part of the 43rd Army. Until 15 September, the division fought in defensive battles near Demidov, then fought in the Dukhovshchina–Demidov Offensive. For its actions in the capture of Demidov, the division was awarded the honorific "Demidov" on 22 September and Usachyov received a second Order of the Red Banner. The division remained with the Kalinin Front, which became the 1st Baltic Front on 20 October. In October and November, the 262nd fought in the advance on Vitebsk during the Belorussian Strategic Offensive as part of the army's 1st Rifle Corps. It then defended positions on the approaches to Vitebsk, rejoining the 39th Army on 15 December.

The army became part of the 3rd Belorussian Front for Operation Bagration in June 1944, and remained with the front until April 1945. On 23 June 1944, at the start of Operation Bagration, it was part of the army's 84th Rifle Corps. For the initial attack (part of the Vitebsk–Orsha Offensive), the division was to attack alongside the 5th Guards Rifle Corps, break through the German defenses on the line of Bondino and Mosino and capture Starinki. It was then to advance on Trubachi alongside the 5th Guards Rifle Corps, outflanking German troops around Vitebsk. In the initial attack, preceded by a 1-hour artillery barrage at 06:00, the tank-supported 262nd broke through the lines of the demoralized German 197th Infantry Division. By 13:00, the 262nd had pushed the 197th back to the Vitebsk–Orsha rail line south of Vitebsk. The 262nd Rifle Division, advancing on the right of the 84th Corps' 164th Rifle Division, pivoted to maintain contact with the 158th Rifle Division east of Vitebsk, while the 164th continued pushing the 197th Infantry Division northwest along the railway line.

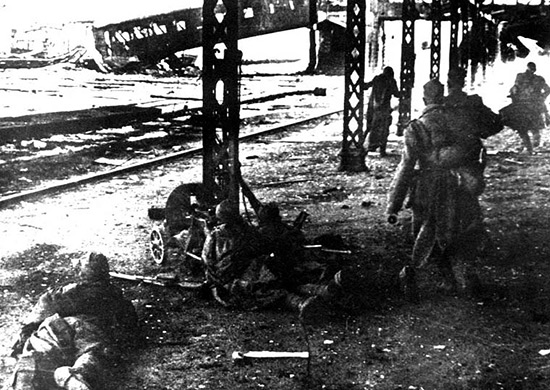
Soviet troops from the 158th Rifle Division fighting on the Vitebsk railway line

On 24 June, after the German LIII Army Corps, holding Vitebsk, withdrew to reduce its frontage, the 84th Rifle Corps was concentrated in a narrow sector southwest of the city and the 158th and 262nd Rifle Divisions advanced north against the German 206th Infantry Division. The 262nd advanced six kilometers to the north that day while the 158th mounted a holding attack to the east to pin the German forces in place. At 06:00 on 26 June, the 262nd joined in the attack, cutting the main road to Vitebsk as the 158th entered the city itself. On the next day, the division participated in the final assault on the city, attacking from the east alongside the 158th following a massive artillery barrage. The German defenders surrendered at 11:45, and the 39th Army moved west to take up position on the southern flank of the 5th Army. On 2 July the division was awarded the Order of the Red Banner for its actions at Vitebsk.

It subsequently advanced into Lithuania during the Vilnius Offensive and the Kaunas Offensive during the summer. On 12 August the 262nd was awarded the Order of Suvorov 2nd class for its actions in the capture of Kaunas. The division fought in the Memel Offensive in October. From January 1945, the division moved into East Prussia, attacking towards Tilsit in the Insterburg–Koenigsberg Offensive. The division spent the last months of the war in the Samland Group of Forces near Königsberg. The division's fighting in the Battle of Königsberg was mainly done by its artillery. On 15 February, the 262nd's 950th Rifle Regiment had only 631 men left, divided into two small battalions, but its artillery regiment was at full strength with three firing battalions. The 262nd fought in the capture of Königsberg and Fischhausen in the last months of the war.

In April, the division and the rest of the 39th Army were withdrawn to the Reserve of the Supreme High Command and moved to the Soviet Far East in May and June in preparation for the Soviet invasion of Manchuria. The 262nd was transported to the Choibalsan area by rail, then marched 400 kilometres (250 mi) to concentration areas south of Tamsagbulag. At the beginning of the invasion on 9 August, the division was part of the 39th Army's 113th Rifle Corps in the Transbaikal Front. The 262nd fought in the Khingan–Mukden Offensive Operation of the invasion. The campaign consisted mainly of fast marches across the Mongolian deserts and the Greater Khingan mountains in temperatures nearing 100 °F (38 °C) with little water. For distinguishing itself in the breakthrough of Japanese fortifications in the Jalainur area and crossing the Greater Khingan, the division was awarded the honorific "Khingan" on 20 September.

=== Postwar ===
The division was disbanded in August and September 1946, part of the 39th Army's 113th Rifle Corps, garrisoning Port Arthur. The 25th Guards Machine Gun Artillery Brigade was formed from the headquarters of the division's 662nd Divisional Artillery Brigade.

== Commanders ==
The following officers commanded the division during World War II:

- Major General Mikhail Kleshnin (July–September 1941)
- Colonel Matvey Tereshchenko (19 September–killed in action 21 December 1941)
- Colonel (promoted to Major General 21 May 1942) Vladimir Gorbachyov (after 21 December 1941–25 June 1943)
- Major General Zakhary Usachyov (26 June 1943–after 3 September 1945)
