= Yeruslan =

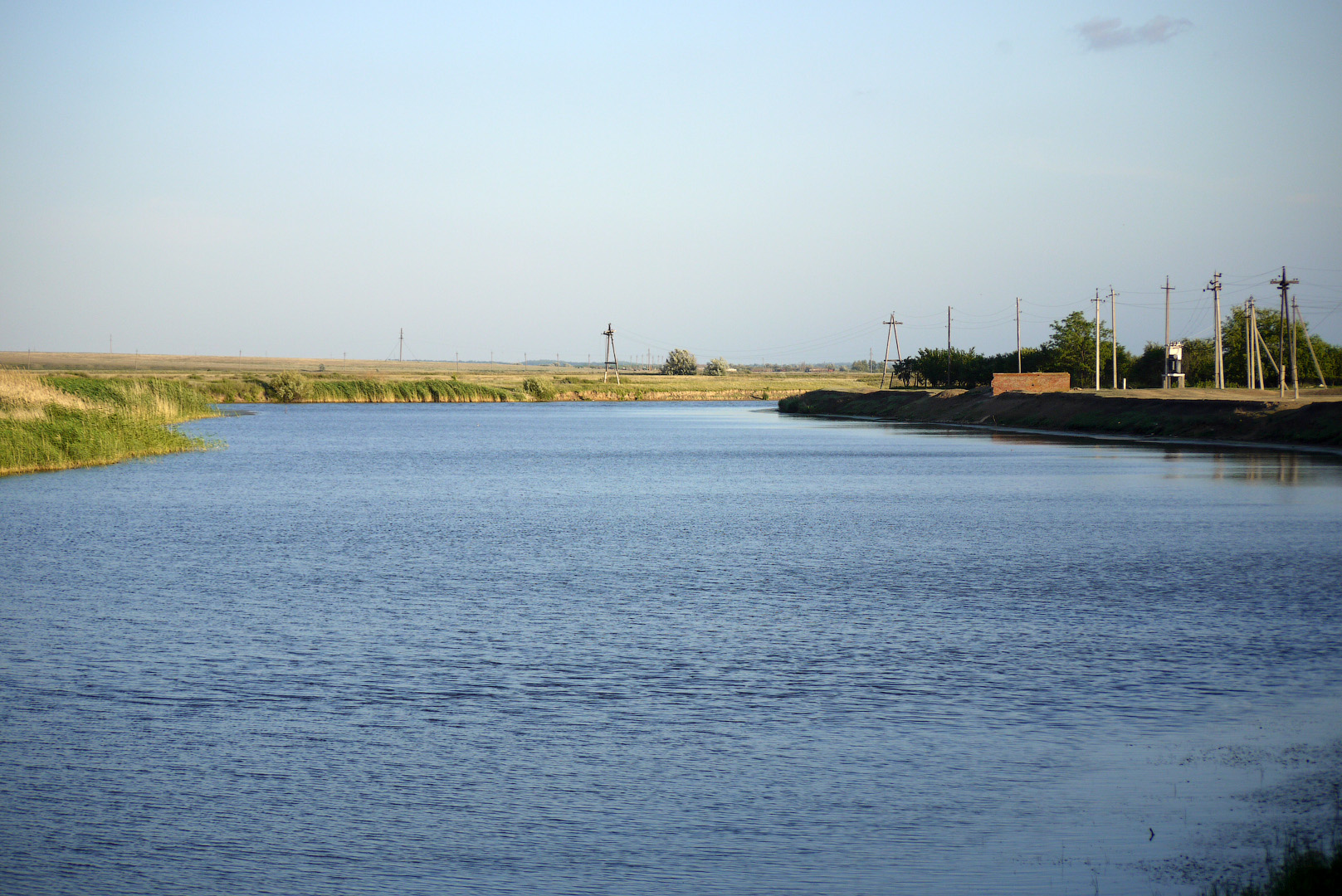

Location
- Country: Russia

Physical characteristics
- Source
  - location: Saratov Oblast, Russia
- Mouth: Volga
  - location: Volgograd Reservoir
  - coordinates: 50.3056°N 46.3972°E
- Length: 278 km (173 mi)
- Basin size: 5,570 km^{2} (2,150 sq mi)

Basin features
- Progression: Volga→ Caspian Sea

Yeruslan (Russian: Еруслан) is a river Saratov Oblast and Volgograd Oblast, Russia, a left tributary of the Volga. It is 278 kilometres (173 mi) long, and its drainage basin covers 5,570 square kilometres (2,150 mi^{2}). It springs from the south-western slope of the Obshchy Syrt and flows to the Yeruslan Cove of the Volgograd Reservoir. Yeruslan has the left inflow Solyonaya Kuba. Its former left tributary Torgun currently flows to the Yeruslan Cove. The town of Krasny Kut is located alongside the Yeruslan.

At summer Yeruslan dries up in some places and has brackish (salty) water.
