= Aşağı Qolqəti =

- Location within Azerbaijan
- Coordinates: 40°40′12″N 47°28′12″E
- Country: Azerbaijan
- Rayon: Agdash
- Time zone: UTC+4 (AZT)
  - Summer (DST): UTC+5 (AZT)

Aşağı Qolqəti (also, Ashaga Kolgaty and Ashagy Kolgaty) is a village in the Agdash Rayon of Azerbaijan.
