= 3rd Rifle Corps =

3rd Rifle Corps 3rd Mountain Rifle Corps
- Active: 1923–1957
- Country: Soviet Union
- Branch: Soviet Army
- Type: Infantry
- Engagements: Soviet invasion of Poland Winter War; World War II: Battle of the Caucasus; Crimean Offensive; Battle of Dukla Pass; Western Carpathian Strategic Offensive; Prague Offensive; Soviet invasion of Hungary
- Battle honours: Carpathian

Commanders
- Notable commanders: Mikhail Grigoryevich Yefremov Pavel Batov; Grigory Kulik; Konstantin Leselidze; Nikolai Gagen; Aleksi Inauri; Mikhail Mikhailovich Ivanov Dmitry Onuprienko

The 3rd Rifle Corps was a corps of the Soviet Red Army which saw service in World War II and in the 1950s. The corps was first formed in 1923 from the 3rd Army Corps in the Moscow Military District and fought in the Soviet invasion of Poland and the Winter War. The corps was disbanded in the summer of 1941 and its headquarters became the 46th Army. The 3rd Mountain Rifle Corps was formed in summer 1942 and fought in the Caucasus, Crimea, Dukla Pass, Carpathia and at Prague. The corps was retained in the Soviet Army postwar and moved to Uzhhorod. The corps fought in the Soviet invasion of Hungary and was disbanded there in 1957. Its headquarters was absorbed by the 38th Army.

== History ==
=== First formation ===
In June 1941 it included the 4th Rifle, 20th Mountain Rifle and the 47th Mountain Rifle Division, as part of Transcaucasus Military District. Upgraded to 46th Army in July 1941 with 4th Rifle, and 9th and 47th Mountain, and in 1941-42 part of Transcaucasus Front, watching the USSR border with Turkey and the Black Sea. Assigned to Steppe Front and then 2nd Ukrainian Front from Sept 1943.

=== Second formation ===
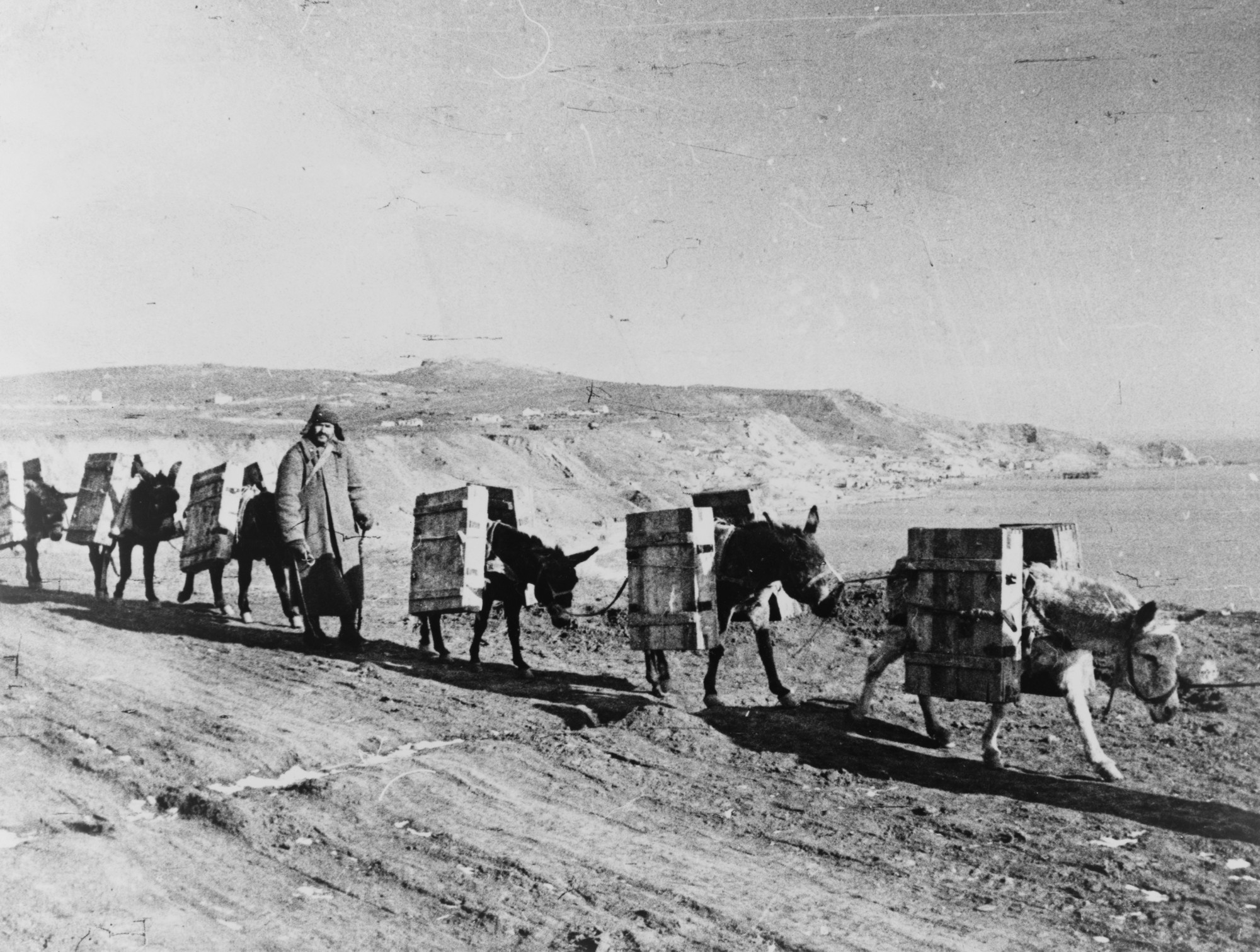
Pack donkeys of the 3rd Mountain Rifle Corps delivering ammunition on the Kerch Peninsula during the Crimean offensive, April 1944

The 3rd Mountain Rifle Corps was ordered to form on 7 June 1942 as part of 46th Army with headquarters in Sukhumi. It included the 20th Mountain Rifle Division, 394th Rifle Division, 63rd Cavalry Division and the Sukhumi Infantry School. The corps was tasked with the defense of the Black Sea coast and the Caucasian passes.

Feskov 2013 lists 3rd Mountain Rifle Corps in the Lvov Military District in July 1945 with the 128th Guards Mountain Rifle Division, 242nd, and 318th Mountain Rifle Divisions. By January 1948 242nd RD had disbanded. In 38th Army, Carpathian Military District with 128th Guards Rifle Division and 318th Rifle Division in January 1951. The same two divisions remained in the corps in 1954 (alongside 35th Guards Rifle Corps, the other corps in 38th Army, with 66th Guards and 70th Guards Rifle Divisions).

In November 1954, the 3rd Mountain Rifle Corps became the 3rd Rifle Corps. In November 1956, the corps took part in the Soviet invasion of Hungary. Its headquarters moved to Székesfehérvár during the invasion. The corps disbanded in Hungary on 21 July 1957, its headquarters being absorbed by HQ 38th Army.
