= Krasny Kut, Saratov Oblast =

Town in Saratov Oblast, Russia

Krasny Kut Красный Кут
- Town
- Interactive map of Krasny Kut
- Location of Krasny Kut Krasny Kut (Saratov Oblast)
- Coordinates: 50°57′N 46°58′E
- Country: Russia
- Federal subject: Saratov Oblast
- Administrative district: Krasnokutsky District
- Founded: 1837
- Town status since: 1966
- Elevation: 45 m (148 ft)

Population (2010 Census)
  - Total: 14,416
  - Estimate (2021): 14,296 (−0.8%)

Administrative status
  - Capital of: Krasnokutsky District

Municipal status
  - Municipal district: Krasnokutsky Municipal District
  - Urban settlement: Krasny Kut Urban Settlement
  - Capital of: Krasnokutsky Municipal District, Krasny Kut Urban Settlement
- Time zone: UTC+4 (MSK+1)
- Postal code: 413230–413235
- Dialing code: +7 84560
- OKTMO ID: 63623101001

Krasny Kut (Russian: Кра́сный Кут, lit. beautiful place) is a town and the administrative center of Krasnokutsky District in Saratov Oblast, Russia, located on the right bank of the Yeruslan River (Volga's tributary), 117 kilometers (73 mi) southeast of Saratov, the administrative center of the oblast. Population: 14,416 (2010 census); 15,334 (2002 census); 17,495 (1989 Soviet census).

== History ==
It was founded in 1837 by Ukrainian migrants and was granted town status in 1966.

Cosmonaut Gherman Titov landed near Krasny Kut at the end of his Vostok 2 mission on August 7, 1961.

== Administrative and municipal status ==
Within the framework of administrative divisions, Krasny Kut serves as the administrative center of Krasnokutsky District, to which it is directly subordinated. As a municipal division, the town of Krasny Kut, together with two rural localities, is incorporated within Krasnokutsky Municipal District as Krasny Kut Urban Settlement.
