= Krasnokutsky District =

Krasnokutsky District Краснокутский район (Russian)
- District
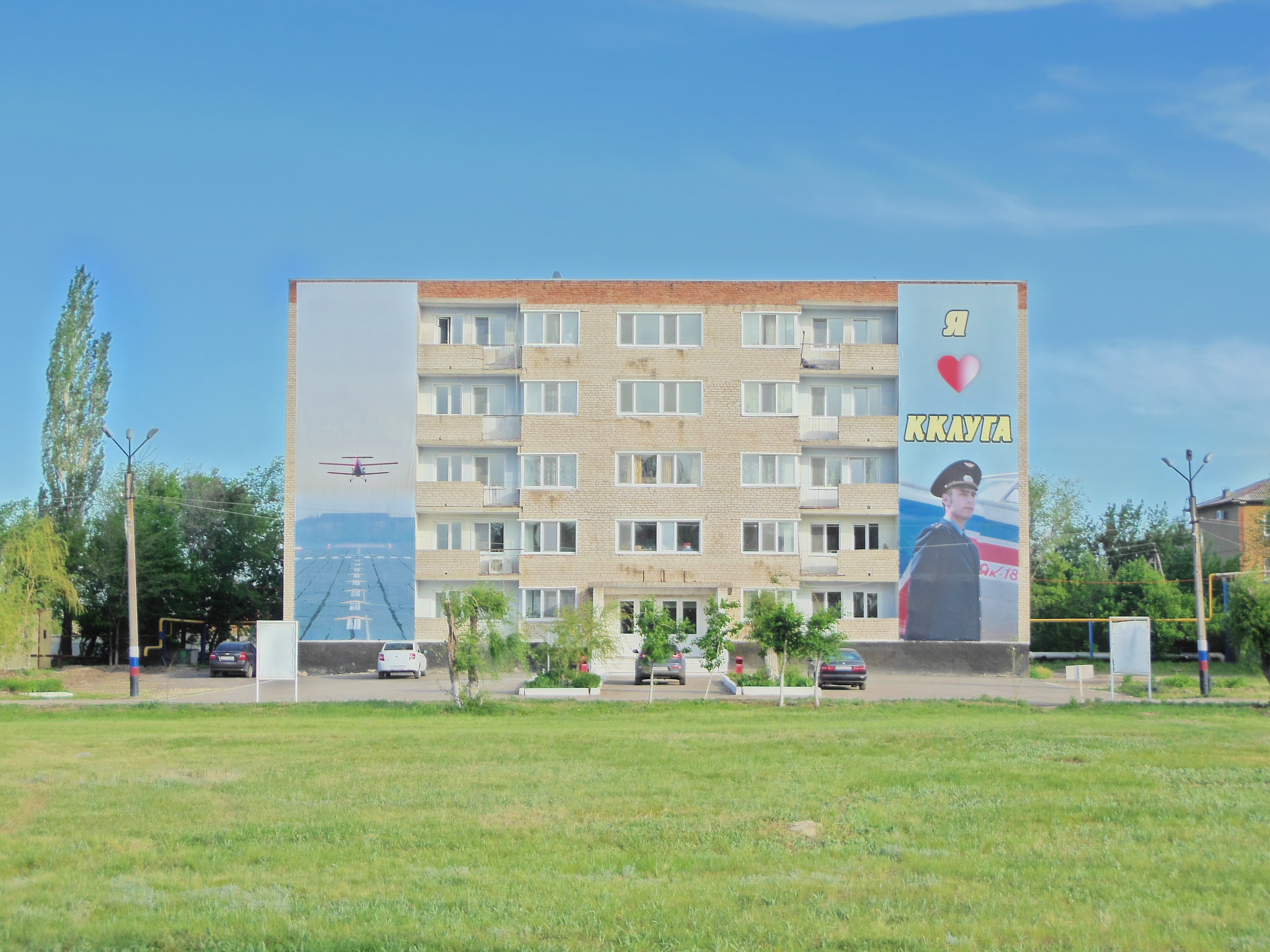
- Barracks in Krasny Kut, Krasnokutsky District

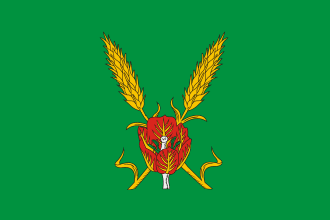
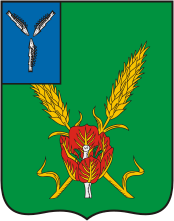
- Flag Coat of arms
- Location of Krasnokutsky District in Saratov Oblast
- Coordinates: 50°57′N 46°58′E
- Country: Russia
- Federal subject: Saratov Oblast
- Established: 7 September 1941
- Administrative center: Krasny Kut

Area
  - Total: 2,900 km^{2} (1,100 sq mi)

Population (2010 Census)
  - Total: 34,676
  - Density: 12/km^{2} (31/sq mi)
  - Urban: 41.6%
  - Rural: 58.4%

Administrative structure
  - Inhabited localities: 1 cities/towns, 41 rural localities

Municipal structure
  - Municipally incorporated as: Krasnokutsky Municipal District
  - Municipal divisions: 1 urban settlements, 11 rural settlements
- Time zone: UTC+4 (MSK+1)
- OKTMO ID: 63623000
- Website: http://www.krasny-kut.ru/

Krasnokutsky District (Russian: Красноку́тский райо́н) is an administrative and municipal district (raion), one of the thirty-eight in Saratov Oblast, Russia. It is located in the south of the oblast. The area of the district is 2,900 square kilometers (1,100 sq mi). Its administrative center is the town of Krasny Kut. Population: 34,676 (2010 Census); 36,445 (2002 census); 37,551 (1989 Soviet census). The population of Krasny Kut accounts for 41.6% of the district's total population.
