= Nikolai Voronov =

Soviet military commander

Nikolai Nikolayevich Voronov
- Никола́й Никола́евич Во́ронов
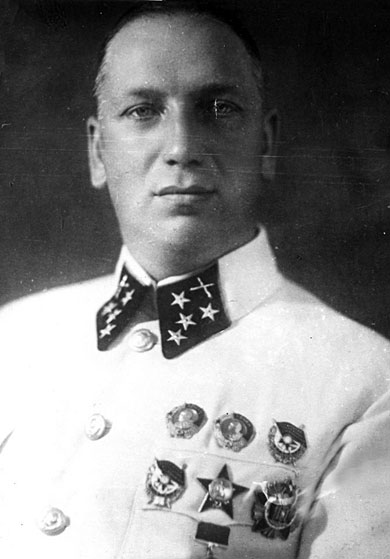
- Voronov in 1966
- Born: 5 May 1899; St. Petersburg, Russian Empire
- Died: 28 February 1968 (aged 68); Moscow, Russian SFSR, Soviet Union
- Burial place: Kremlin Wall Necropolis
- Military career
- Allegiance: Soviet Union
- Branch: Artillery
- Service years: 1918–1968
- Rank: Chief marshal of the artillery
- Nickname: Artillery
- Conflicts: Russian Civil War; Polish-Soviet War; Spanish Civil War; Soviet–Japanese Border Wars; Battle of Khalkin Gol; World War II; Soviet invasion of Poland; Winter War; Great Patriotic War; Battle of Smolensk; First Sinyavino offensive; Battle of Moscow; Battle of Stalingrad; Operation Uranus; Operation Koltso; Operation Little Saturn; Siege of Leningrad; Battle of Kursk; Smolensk operation; Baltic offensive
- Awards: Hero of the Soviet Union; Order of Lenin (6); Order of the October Revolution; Order of the Red Banner (4); Order of Suvorov, 1st class (3); Order of the Red Star

Nikolai Nikolayevich Voronov (Russian: Никола́й Никола́евич Во́ронов; 5 May [O.S. 23 April] 1899 – 28 February 1968) was a Soviet general, Chief Marshal of Artillery (1944), and Hero of the Soviet Union (7 May 1965). He was commander of artillery forces of the Red Army from 1941 until 1950. Voronov commanded the Soviet artillery during the Battle of Stalingrad and was the Stavka representative to various fronts during the Siege of Leningrad and the Battle of Kursk. He also fought in the Russian Civil War, the Polish-Soviet War and the Battle of Khalkhin Gol, as well as serving as an advisor to the Spanish Republican Army during the Spanish Civil War.

== Early life ==
Nikolai Voronov was born on 5 May 1899 in Saint Petersburg to Nikolai Terentyvich Voronov, a clerk, and Valentina Voronov. After the Revolution of 1905, Voronov's father became unemployed due to his Russian Social Democratic Labour Party sympathies. On 30 November 1908, his poverty-stricken mother committed suicide by taking cyanide. Voronov dropped out of a private school in 1914 due to financial problems and in 1915 got a job working as a secretary for an attorney. In the fall of 1916, his father was drafted. In 1917, Voronov passed an external degree examination.

== Military service ==
=== Russian Civil War and Polish-Soviet War ===
In March 1918, Voronov joined the Red Army. In the same year, he completed the 2nd Petrograd Artillery courses, after which he was a platoon commander in a howitzer battalion in the Petrograd 2nd Battery. As part of the 15th Army, he fought in battles against Nikolai Yudenich's forces near Pskov. In 1919, Voronov joined the Russian Communist Party (Bolsheviks).

Beginning in April 1920, Voronov fought in the Polish–Soviet War with the 83rd Regiment of the 10th Rifle Division. His battery was armed with the 76 mm divisional gun M1902 instead of the 122 mm howitzer M1910. On 17 August, Voronov received a severe concussion during a battle in the village of Józefów nad Wisłą. When he regained consciousness, he found that Polish troops had captured the village. The injured Voronov attempted to escape on a horse, but was captured. During his eight months of captivity, Voronov suffered from typhus and twice came close to having his leg amputated. He was repatriated at the end of the war in April 1921.

=== Interwar period ===
In the summer of 1922, Voronov was appointed commander of the howitzer battery of the 27th Rifle Division. In fall 1923 he attended the school of higher artillery commanders and after graduation continued to serve with the 27th Rifle Division. During the 1926 maneuvers, Voronov distinguished himself commanding the artillery of the Belorussian Military District. As a reward, he was granted permission to take the entrance examination for the Frunze Military Academy.

In 1930, Voronov graduated from the academy. He became the commander of the artillery regiment of the 1st Moscow Rifle Division. In August 1932, Voronov was sent to Italy as part of the Soviet mission there. In April 1934, he was appointed chief military Commissar of the 1st Artillery School. In 1936, he was awarded the Order of the Red Star for his management of the school. In 1935, he served on the Soviet military mission to Italy for the second time, and was promoted to Kombrig on 11 November. In 1937, he was sent under the name "Voltaire" as an advisor to the Spanish Republicans, where he worked on the training of artillery units on the Madrid Front. During his tour in Spain, Voronov was awarded the Order of Lenin and the Order of the Red Banner. In June 1937, Voronov returned to Moscow.

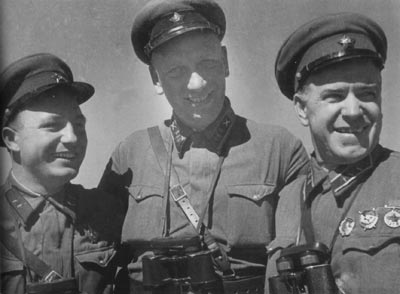
Voronov, Nikishov and Zhukov during the Battle of Khalkin Gol

He was promoted to Komkor and replaced Komdiv N.M. Rogowski as the chief of the artillery of the Red Army, who was later shot during the Case of Trotskyist Anti-Soviet Military Organization, on 20 June 1937. Voronov started work on the modernization of the Red Army artillery, and in November 1937 submitted a memorandum to Kliment Voroshilov on the modernization of the artillery. At the end of July 1938 Voronov went as part of a special commission of the People's Commissariat of Defence to test the combat training of the Far Eastern Military District during the Battle of Lake Khasan. In June 1939, he was sent to Khalkhyn Gol to lead the 1st Army Group's artillery during the Battles of Khalkhin Gol. For his actions during the battle, Voronov was awarded a second Order of the Red Banner.

In September 1939, Voronov commanded the Belorussian Military District's artillery during the Soviet invasion of Poland. He was severely injured in a car accident and said his life was saved by a silver pen given to him by Dolores Ibárruri in Spain. In November, Voronov inspected the troops of the Leningrad Military District, in readiness for the Winter War. During the war, he led artillery units, mainly those of the 7th Army, and fought in the offensive against the Mannerheim Line. For his actions during the war, Voronov was awarded a second Order of Lenin and was promoted to Komandarm 2nd rank. On 4 June 1940, he was given the rank of colonel general of the artillery after the introduction of Red Army general officers ranks. Voronov led the Kiev Special Military District's artillery during the Soviet occupation of Bessarabia and Northern Bukovina.

An order of the People's Commissariat of Defence on 13 July abolished the position of chief of the artillery and introduced the position of first deputy chief of GRAU. Voronov was appointed to this position, subordinate to Grigory Kulik.

=== World War II ===
On 19 June 1941, Voronov was transferred to the post of Chief of the Main Directorate of Air Defence, Bellamy 2008, p. 160 who was now personally accountable to the People's Commissar of Defence. During the first days of the war on the Eastern Front; Voronov reinforced the air defence of Moscow. On 19 July, the post of chief of the artillery was restored and Voronov was appointed to that position. On 20 July, he was ordered organized antitank artillery during the Yelnya Offensive. After returning to Moscow, Voronov, together with Leonid Govorov, developed detailed instructions on antitank tactics, which was soon sent to the troops as a Stavka directive. As part of the State Defense Committee, Voronov went to Leningrad to organized antitank defence and the artillery. Through the efforts of Voronov, the GRAU became subordinate to the Chief of the Artillery. Voronov also set up an artillery headquarters, led by Ivan Susloparov.

After his return in mid-September to Moscow, Voronov at the request of the Leningrad Front's military council was sent to Leningrad, where he assisted in the carrying out of counterattacks. After returning to Moscow in October, Voronov reviewed the readiness of the Moscow Reserve Front and also worked on the formation of antitank and artillery regiments intended for the defence of Moscow. In late October, Voronov was sent back to Leningrad to organized the front's artillery during the Sinyavino Offensive in the area of the Nevsky Pyatachok. Voronov organized artillery production and the defence of the Road of Life until his return to Moscow on 5 December. He also met his father, who continued to stay in the city.

Voronov worked on the supply, acquisition and coordination of artillery units in the areas of the Winter Campaign of 1941–42. In his report to Stalin of 28 February, Voronov raised the question of military air defence, which since November 1941 had remained without leadership. On 2 June, by order of the People's Commissariat for Defence, all air defence units were subordinated to the front artillery commanders and the chief of the artillery. In early June, Voronov took part in the planning and conducting of operations on the left flank of the Western Front. In July, he went to Stalingrad to assist the retreating 62nd Army and 64th Army. During the Moscow Conference, Shaposhnikov, Voroshilov and Voronov represented the Soviet Union during talks with the British military delegation. In September, Voronov accompanied Aleksandr Vasilevsky on a tour of the Southwestern Front, Stalingrad Front and Don Front. Voronov began to plan the artillery barrage in Operation Uranus. After the approval of the plan for Operation Uranus, Voronov worked with the chiefs of artillery of the fronts and supervised the training of units to conduct the offensive. During the beginning of the operation, Voronov was in the command post of the 21st Army. On 31 October, Voronov issued a decree on the establishment of artillery divisions in the Reserve of the Supreme High Command (Stavka Reserve). In late November, Voronov, Vasilevsky and Alexander Novikov visited the area of Operation Little Saturn.

From 16 to 19 December, Voronov coordinated the artillery of the Southwestern and Voronezh Fronts. On 19 December, he was sent to the Don Front to aid in the planning and implementation of operations for the elimination of the surrounded German troops in Stalingrad.

On 10 January 1943, after an artillery barrage, Operation Koltso was launched. For the operation, Voronov was awarded the Order of Suvorov 1st class. On 18 January, he was promoted to Marshal of the Artillery. On 31 January, Field Marshal Friedrich Paulus surrendered to Soviet troops and Voronov personally interrogated him. In early February, Voronov was sent to the Northwestern Front to assist with the planning and operation of the Demyansk Offensive. In April, the Katyusha rocket launcher units were handed over to the chief of the artillery, but self-propelled artillery units were placed under command of tank units, despite Voronov's protests. From May to June, Voronov oversaw the formation of the first five breakthrough artillery corps, and on 5 July served as the representative for the commander of the Bryansk Front, as well as checking the preparation of the artillery bombardment in the Battle of Kursk. On 3 August, he was sent to the Western Front to monitor the planning and conduct of the Battle of Smolensk.

On 30 August, Voronov was sent to the Kalinin Front. On 20 October, he coordinated the actions of the 1st Baltic Front, 2nd Baltic Front and Western Front. In early 1944, he had to resign from his position as a Stavka representative and return to Moscow for treatment of health issues. Voronov then helped redeploy ammunition and artillery to the Far Eastern Front. On 21 February, he was promoted to chief marshal of the artillery. On 20 March 1944, Voronov was featured on the cover of Time magazine.

=== Postwar ===
In May 1946, Voronov began the establishment of the Academy of Artillery Sciences. He was also elected a deputy of the Soviet of the Union. In 1950, he was released from his position and became the president of the Academy of Artillery Sciences, responsible for developing strategic nuclear weapons. In 1953, he was appointed chief of the Military Artillery Command Academy in Leningrad. In October 1958, he was transferred to the Group of Inspectors General of the Ministry of Defence due to health issues, where he was until his death. In 1963, Voronov published his memoirs, titled 'На службе военной', or On Military Service. On 7 May 1965, he was awarded the title Hero of the Soviet Union on the 20th anniversary of the end of World War II. On 23 February 1968, a tumor was discovered and Voronov was operated on. On 28 February he died without regaining consciousness.

He was cremated and his ashes were buried in the Kremlin Wall Necropolis.

== Personal life ==
Voronov was an avid football fan and was a supporter of CSKA Moscow. He married Nina and had a son, Vladimir.

== Honours and awards ==
Voronov received the following Soviet awards:

- Hero of the Soviet Union
- Order of Lenin, six times
- Order of the October Revolution
- Order of the Red Banner, four times
- Order of Suvorov, 1st Class, three times
- Order of the Red Star
- Medal "For the Defence of Leningrad"
- Medal "For the Defence of Stalingrad"
- Medal "For the Defence of Moscow"
- Medal "For the Victory over Germany in the Great Patriotic War 1941–1945"
- Jubilee Medal "Twenty Years of Victory in the Great Patriotic War 1941–1945"
- Medal "For the Victory over Japan"
- Jubilee Medal "XX Years of the Workers' and Peasants' Red Army"
- Jubilee Medal "30 Years of the Soviet Army and Navy"
- Jubilee Medal "40 Years of the Armed Forces of the USSR"
- Jubilee Medal "50 Years of the Armed Forces of the USSR"
- Medal "In Commemoration of the 800th Anniversary of Moscow"
- Medal "In Commemoration of the 250th Anniversary of Leningrad"
- Honorary weapons

He also received the following foreign awards:

- Order of Sukhbaatar (Mongolia)
- Order of the Red Banner (Mongolia)
- Order of the Partisan Star, 1st class (Yugoslavia)
- Order of National Liberation (Yugoslavia)
- Cross of Grunwald, 1st class (Poland)
- Commander of the Order of Polonia Restituta (Poland)

Nikolai Voronov is interred in the Kremlin Wall Necropolis at the Red Square.

== Dates of rank ==
Voronov's promotion dates were as follows:

- Kombrig: 26 November 1935
- Komkor: 20 June 1937
- Colonel General: 7 May 1940
- Marshal of the Artillery: 18 January 1943 (equivalent to NATO four star rank)
- Chief Marshal of Artillery: 21 February 1944

== See also ==
- Ivan Kamera (1897-1952), artillery general during World War II
