= 8th Rifle Division (Soviet Union) =

- Active: First Formation: (September 1918 – July 1941); Second Formation: (July – October 1941); Third Formation: (1941–1945)
- Country: Soviet Union
- Branch: Red Army
- Type: Infantry
- Size: Division
- Engagements: Russian Civil War; Polish–Soviet War; World War II; Invasion of Poland; Winter War; Eastern Front; Battle of Bialystok-Minsk; Battle of Moscow; Battle of Kursk; Battle of the Dnieper; Zhitomir-Berdichev Offensive; Prague Offensive
- Decorations: Order of the Red Banner of Labour (1st formation); Order of the Red Banner (3rd formation); Order of Suvorov, 2nd class (3rd formation)
- Battle honours: Minsk (1st formation); Named for F.E. Dzerzhinsky (1st formation); Yampol (3rd formation)

Commanders
- Notable commanders: Vladimir Kolpakchi Nikolay Ugryumov Porfiry Hutz

The 8th Rifle Division was a military formation of the Soviet Union's Red Army in the Winter War, the Soviet invasion of Poland, and World War II. It was formed three times.

== First formation: 1918–1941 ==
The division was formed on 24 September 1918 by order of the Moscow District Military Commissar as the 8th Infantry Division on the basis of the 5th Moscow Infantry Division, the 1st Tula Infantry Division, the 2nd Tambov Infantry Division, and the Kaluga Infantry Division. On 11 October, it was renamed the 8th Rifle Division.

The division received a number of awards between the 1920s and 1930s. On 8 December 1921 it was given the battle honor "Minsk." On 29 February 1928 it was awarded the Honorary Revolutionary Red Banner on the 10th anniversary of the Red Army.

On 26 July 1926, it was given the honorary name "Dzerzhinsky," and in 1932 was awarded the Order of the Red Banner of Labour. A reference to being "formed at Semipalatinsk prior to 1936" in Poirer and Connor's Red Army Order of Battle remains unconfirmed by Russian sources. The formation's full title appears to have become the 8th Minsk Red Banner Order of Red Banner of Labor Dzerzhinsky Rifle Division.

Brigade Commander Vladimir Kolpakchi took command of the unit in 1933. The division took part in the Invasion of Poland as part of the 16th Rifle Corps, 11th Army. Brigade Commander Ivan Fursin held command from December 1938 to 4 February 1940. On 22 January 1940, it was part of the 13th Rifle Corps of the Northwestern Front during the Winter War, but had been shifted to the 23rd Rifle Corps by 31 January 1940. On 5 February 1940 Brigade Commander Fyodor Dmitrievich Rubtsov took command. On 8 March 1940 it was part of the Northwestern Front's 15th Rifle Corps. On 27 April 1940 Colonel Nikolay Fomin took command from Rubtsov. On 22 June 1941, it was part of the 1st Rifle Corps, 10th Army, itself part of the Western Front.

Major components at the beginning of Operation Barbarossa included the 151st, 229th, and 310th Rifle Regiments, the 62nd Light Artillery Regiment, the 117th Howitzer Artillery Regiment, and the 2nd Reconnaissance Company. During the Second World War it was part of the 'Operational Army' from 22 June 1941 to 4 July 1941.

The division was stationed in and around Łomża. According to the plan for covering the Western Special Military District, the division was to take up positions in the 66th (Osovets) Fortified Area and along the 1939 state border with German-occupied Poland in the areas of Shchuchyn, Brzozowo, Ptak, and Servatki.

On the first day of the war, the division headquarters came under aerial bombardment, but retained control of its units; the left-flank 310th Rifle Regiment fought a ten-hour losing battle for Kolno. By 23 June 1941, the division continued to hold the front in the Ščučyn area. On 26 June, the division began to withdraw from semi-encircirclement near Osowiec. By 27 June, the front headquarters had lost contact with the 10th Army, which included the division.

By 1 July 1941 the division was still part of 1st Rifle Corps, but the corps was diverted directly to the Western Front. In early July, the division was destroyed in the Białystok area, as part of the German encirclement west of Minsk but individual groups continued unorganized resistance until August. The division was officially disbanded on 19 September 1941.

== Second formation: 1941 ==
The second formation was formed on 2 July 1941 in the Krasnopresnensky District of Moscow as the 8th Krasnopresnenskaya Rifle Division of the People's Militia. On August 24, 1941, it was renamed the 8th Rifle Division. On 2 July 1941 the division reformed in the Krasnopresnensky District of Moscow, as the 8th Krasnopresnenskaya Peoples' Militia Rifle Division under the command of the Moscow Military District. The division contained an unusually large number of writers, musicians and historians; the writers were put together in the 3rd Company of the 1st Battalion of the 24th Rifle Regiment, which became known as the "Writers' Company".

By order of the commander of the Moscow Military District on 9 July 1941, all divisions of the people's militia were withdrawn from Moscow to camps. By 10 July 1941, division's regiments deployed to the forest near Nikolo-Uryupino and Buzlanovo. In late July, the division engaged fortifying the Moscow Line of Defence. From at least 1 August 1941 to its destruction, the division was part of the 32nd Army, itself part of the Reserve Front.

On 4 August 1941 the division took up positions on the Rzhev-Vyazma line of defence, and on 30 August, in positions on the eastern bank of the Dnieper River as well. On 24 August 1941 the formation was formally renamed the 8th Rifle Division. It included the 22nd, 23rd, and 24th Rifle Regiments. In October, in connection with the beginning of the German Operation Typhoon it moved to the east of Yelnya.

By October, with the start of the Battle of Moscow, the division was transferred east of Yelnya. It entered combat on 4 October. By 5 October, it lost more than half of its personnel, and on 6 October, it was encircled. Some of the division's surviving troops joined partisan detachments, while others were able to regroup with the Soviet forces. While the division was effectively destroyed on 6–7 October, it was not formally disbanded until 30 November.

== Third formation: 1941-1945 ==
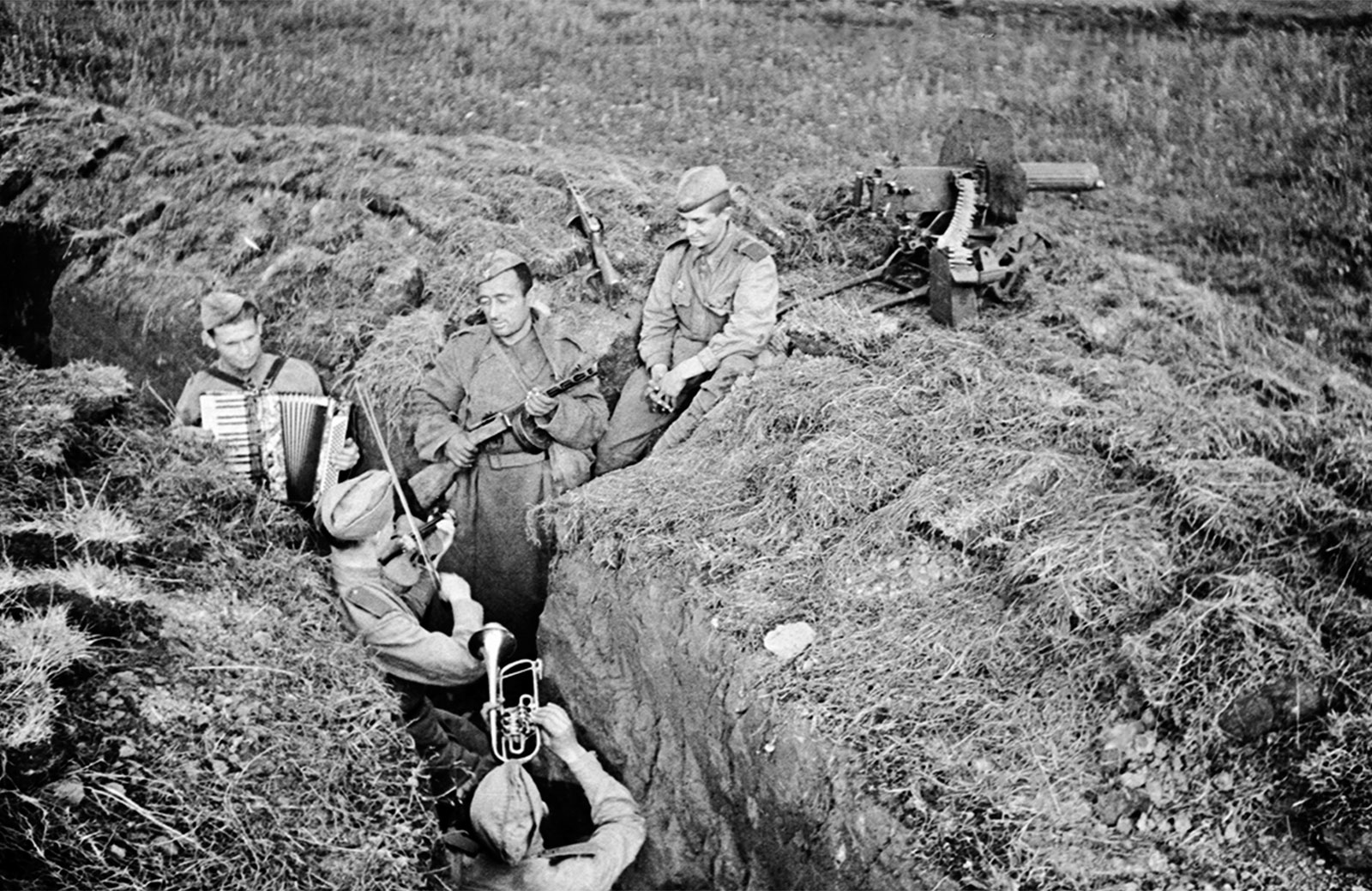
A team of musicians from the divisional house of Red Army soldiers performs for the commander of the heavy machine gun of the 2nd Rifle Battalion of the 151st Rifle Regiment of the 8th Rifle Division, senior sergeant Vasily Andreyevich Morozov (born 1920), and Marmalid Kasimov, who distinguished themselves in battle on 5 July 1943

The third formation of the 8th Rifle Division traces its origins to the 458th Rifle Division, which was formed in Semipalatinsk and Ayaguz in the Central Asian Military District on 25 December 1941. In early 1942 it was redesignated as the 8th Rifle Division. Its rifle regiments, using the same numbers as the first formation, were the 151st, 229th, and 310th. Its full name became the 8th Yampol Red Banner Order of Suvorov Rifle Division, after winning the battle honor Yampol.

The personnel of the formation mainly consisted of residents of the Kazakh SSR and partly from the Kuibyshev Oblast of the RSFSR, while the command and political staff was staffed from among the party and Komsomol activists of the Semipalatinsk Oblast. During the division's formation, the personnel of the unit underwent accelerated training programs.

On 1 April 1942, the division was sent to the Eastern Front. On 24 April, the division arrived in the city of Stalinogorsk and was placed at the disposal of the 24th Army of the Bryansk Front. By 1 October it was part of 13th Army, and stayed assigned to that formation on 1 July 1943 it was assigned to the Soviet Central Front's 13th Army, as part of the 15th Rifle Corps. It participated in the Voronezh-Kastornoye, Eastern Carpathian, and the Prague offensives, the Battle of Kursk, and the crossing of the Dnieper, Desna, and Pripyat Rivers. It defended Mtsensk and participated in the liberation of Kromy, Nevel, Novgorod-Seversky, and Chernigov.

=== Subordination 1944–1945 ===
- 1st Ukrainian Front, 60th Army, 23rd Rifle Corps – on 1 January 1944
- 1st Ukrainian Front, 18th Army, 17th Guards Rifle Corps – on 1 July 1944
- 4th Ukrainian Front (front-line attachment) – to 1 October 1944
- 4th Ukrainian Front, 16th Army – on 1 January 1945,
- 4th Ukrainian Front, 18th Army, 17th Guards Rifle Corps – on 1 April 1945

The division was part of the 18th Army of the 4th Ukrainian Front in May 1945. The 8th Division was ordered disbanded on 29 May by the order that formed the Northern Group of Forces, with its troops used to reinforce the units of the group.
