= Front (military formation) =

Type of military formation originating in Russia

NATO Map Symbols

a friendly front
a hostile front

A front (Russian: фронт, romanized: front) is a type of military formation that originates in the Russian Empire, and has been used by the Polish Army, the Red Army, the Soviet Army, and Turkey. It is roughly equivalent to an army group in the military of most other countries. It varies in size but in general contains three to five armies. It should not be confused with the more general usage of military front, describing a geographic area in wartime.

== Russian Empire ==
After the outbreak of the First World War, the Russian General Headquarters set up two Fronts: Northwestern Front, uniting forces deployed against German Empire, and Southwestern Front, uniting forces deployed against Austria-Hungary.

In August 1915, Northwestern Front was split into Northern Front and Western Front.

At the end of 1916 Romanian Front was established, which also included remnants of the Romanian army.

In April 1917, Caucasus Front was established by the reorganization of the Caucasus Army.

== Soviet fronts in the Russian Civil War ==
The Soviet fronts were first raised during the Russian Civil War. They were wartime organizations only, in the peacetime the fronts were normally disbanded and their armies organized back into military districts. Usually a single district formed a single front at the start of the hostilities, or when hostilities were anticipated. Some military districts could not form a front. Fronts were also formed during the Polish-Soviet War of 1920.

The main fronts during the Russian Civil War and Polish-Soviet War were :

- Northern Front (15 September 1918 – 19 February 1919)
- Western Front (12 February 1919 – 8 April 1924)
- Southwestern Front (10 January 1920 – 5 December 1920)
- Southern Front (September 1918 – January 1920 and September – December 1920)
- Southeastern Front (30 September 1919 – 16 January 1920).
- Eastern Front (13 June 1918 – 15 January 1920)
- Turkestan Front (23 February 1919 – 4 June 1926)
- Ukrainian Front (January – June 1919)
- Caspian-Caucasian Front (8 December 1918 – 13 March 1919)
- Caucasian Front (16 January 1920 – 29 May 1921)

== Soviet fronts in World War II ==
Army groups differ from fronts in that a Soviet front typically had its own army-sized tactical fixed-wing aviation organization. According to Soviet military doctrine, the air army was directly subordinated to the front commander (typically a ground commander). The reform of 1935 established that in case of a war the peacetime military districts on the border would split upon mobilisation each into a Front Command (taking control of the district's peacetime military formations) and a Military District Command (which stayed behind with the mission of mobilising the reserve formations and putting them at the disposal of the Fronts as replacement troops). In that sense the Air Armies were under Air Force command in peacetime, but under the command of the Front HQs in wartime; and the Fronts were commanded by ground-forces generals. An entire Front might report either to the Stavka or to a theatre of military operations (TVD). A Front was mobilised for a specific operation, after which it could be reformed and tasked with another operation (including a change of the Front's designation) or it could be disbanded - with its formations dispersed among the other active Fronts and its HQ reintegrated into its original Military District HQ.

Soviet and Russian military doctrine calls the different levels in the command chain (including the Fronts) "Organs of Military Control" (Russian: Органы военного управления).

Organs of Military Control
| Level | Peacetime | Peacetime and wartime | Function | Examples |
|---|---|---|---|---|
| Highest political control | Main Military Council (Russian: Главный военный совет РККА) | Stavka of the Supreme Main Command (Russian: Ставка верховного главнокомандования): General Staff | Exercises supreme party control over the armed forces. It could best be considered as the office for military matters of the head of state. During World War I this was the Stavka of the Supreme Commander (Russian: Ставка Верховного Главнокомандующего) aiding Tsar Nicholas II. During World War II this was the Stavka of the Supreme Main Command (Russian: Ставка верховного главного командования) aiding Joseph Stalin, who took precedence over it after the launch of the German invasion into the Soviet Union. | |
| Highest military control | General Staff (Russian: Генеральный штаб РККА) | Stavka of the Supreme Main Command (Russian: Ставка верховного главнокомандования): General Staff | In wartime the General Staff became a department of the Stavka. | |
| Strategical | | Main Command of the Troops of a Strategic Direction (Russian: Главное командование войск направления) | The Main Command of the Troops of a Strategic Direction were organised in wartime in 1941 – 42, each to take control over several Fronts, Fleets, Separate Armies and / or Flotillas. In 1979 in the years of high confrontation between the countries of the Western liberal democracies and those of the Socialist Bloc the Main Commands of the Troops of a Strategic Directions were reinstated covertly: Main Command of the Troops of the Western Direction (Russian: Главное командование войск Западного направления) in Legnica (Poland); Main Command of the Troops of the South-Western Direction (Russian: Главное командование войск Юго-Западного направления) in Chișinău; Main Command of the Troops of the Southern Direction (Russian: Главное командование войск Южного направления) in Baku and the; Main Command of the Troops in the Far East (Russian: Главное командование войск Дальнего Востока) in Ulan-Ude. | Main Command of the Troops of the North-Western Direction (Russian: Главное командование войск Северо-Западного направления). Existed between 10 July and 27 August 1941 under the command of Marshal of the Soviet Union Kliment Voroshilov. It commanded the: Northern and Northwestern Fronts and the Northern and the Baltic Fleets.; Main Command of the Troops of the Western Direction (Russian: Главное командование войск Западного направления). Existed between 10 July and 10 September 1941 under the command of Marshal of the Soviet Union Semyon Timoshenko. It commanded the: Western, Central and Reserve Fronts and the Pinsk Flotilla.; Main Command of the Troops of the South-Western Direction (Russian: Главное командование войск Юго-Западного направления). Existed between 10 July 1941 and 21 June 1942 under the command of initially Marshal of the Soviet Union Semyon Budyonny, since September 1941 of Marshal of the Soviet Union Semyon Timoshenko. It commanded the: Southwestern, Southern (Sep.-Oct. 1041), Bryansk (Dec. 1941 – April 1942) Fronts and the Black Sea Fleet (until April 1942).; Main Command of the Troops of the North Caucasus Direction (Russian: Главное командование войск Северо-Кавказского направления). Existed between 21 April and 19 May 1942 under the command of Marshal of the Soviet Union Semyon Budyonny. It commanded the: Crimean Front, the Sevastopol Defence Area, North Caucasus Military District, the Black Sea Fleet and the Azov Flotilla.; Main Command of the Soviet Troops in the Far East (Russian: Главное командование советских войск на Дальнем Востоке). Existed between 30 July and 17 December 1945 under the command of Marshal of the Soviet Union Aleksandr Vasilevsky. It commanded the: Transbaikal, Far Eastern (since 5 August the 2nd Far Eastern) Fronts, the Maritime Group of Forces (since 5 August the 1st Far Eastern front), the Pacific Fleet and the Amur Flotilla. |
| Operational-Strategical | Military district (Russian: Военный округ) | FRONT (Russian: Фронт) | The Military Districts were high military commands in charge of the combat readiness of troops, of training centers and schools, of support to the security services in cases of insurrections and of support to the population in case of disasters. Initially a distinction was made between border and internal (Russian: "приграничные" и "внутренние") MDs. With a decree of the People's Commissariat for Defence dated 17 May 1935 the border districts were further divided between first-line and second-line (Russian: "лобовые" и "тыловые", literally "head" and "rear") MDs. A provision was put in force, grouping a first-line district with two second-line districts, according to which in wartime the first-line MD would form a Frontal HQ and the rear districts would prepare replacements for it. This grouping was called a "Strategic Direction". Another decree of the PCD from 13 August 1940 introduced further changes in the war plans. The distinction between first- and second-line border districts was abolished. The 16 Military Districts were divided between 8 districts bordering potential enemy states, which would in case of a war form Frontal HQs and 8 internal MDs, which would form Separate Army commands. | |
| Operational-Strategical | None in peacetime | Separate Army (Russian: Отдельная армия) | | |
| Operational | None in peacetime | Army (Russian: Армия) | | |
| Operational-Tactical | None in peacetime | Separate Corps (Russian: Отдельный корпус) | | |
| Operational-Tactical | Corps | Corps (Russian: Корпус) | | |
| Tactical | Separate Division | Separate Division (Russian: Отдельная дивизия) | | |
| Tactical | Division | Division (Russian: Дивизия) | | |
| Tactical | (Separate) Brigade | (Separate) Brigade (Russian: (Отдельная) Бригада) | | |

The degree of change in the structure and performance of individual fronts can only be understood when seen in the context of the strategic operations of the Red Army in World War II.

Soviet fronts in the European Theatre during the Second World War from 1941 to 1945:

| Formed from | FRONT (time period) | Commanders | Reformed into |
|---|---|---|---|
1941
| Baltic Special Military District | Northwestern Front (22.6.41. – 20.11.43.) | Fyodor Kuznetsov, Pyotr Sobennikov, Pavel Kurochkin, Semyon Timoshenko, Ivan Konev | disbanded |
| Western Special Military District | Western Front (22.6.41. – 15.4.44.) | Dmitry Pavlov, Andrey Yeryomenko, Semyon Timoshenko, Ivan Konev, Georgy Zhukov, Vasily Sokolovsky, Ivan Chernyakhovsky | 3rd Belorussian Front |
| Kiev Special Military District | Southwestern Front (I) (21.6.41. – 12.7.42.) | Mikhail Kirponos, Semyon Timoshenko, Fyodor Kostenko | split between the Southern Front and the Stalingrad Front |
| Leningrad Military District | Northern Front (24.6.41. – 26.8.41.) | Markian Popov | split between the Leningrad Front and the Karelian Front |
| mobilised peacetime formations of the Moscow Military District | Southern Front (I) (25.6.41. – 28.7.41.) | Ivan Tyulenev, Dmitry Ryabyshev, Yakov Cherevichenko, Rodion Malinovsky | North Caucasian Front |
| NKVD troops transferred to the Army (the STAVKA Reserve Armies Group) | Reserve Armies Front (14.7.41. – 29.7.41.) | Ivan Bogdanov (NKVD) | split between the Western Front and the newly formed Reserve Front |
| Moscow Military District | Mozhaysk Line of Defence Front (18 – 30.7.41.) | Pavel Artemyev (NKVD) | Reserve Front |
| Headquarters of the 4th Army & Right wing of Western Front | Central Front (I) (26.7.41. – 25.8.41.) | Fyodor Kuznetsov, Mikhail Yefremov | heavy casualties inflicted by the main German spearhead, disbanded, what was left of the Central Front was absorbed into the Bryansk Front (I) |
| Reserve Armies Front | Reserve Front (I) (30.7.41. – 12.10.41.) | Georgy Zhukov, Semyon Budyonny | merged with the Western Front |
| 20th Rifle Corps and 25th Mechanized Corps | Bryansk Front (I) (16.8.41. – 10.11.41.) | Andrey Yeryomenko, Mikhail Petrov, Georgiy Zakharov | disbanded |
| Transcaucasian Military District and Sevastopol Defensive Area | Transcaucasian Front (I) (23.8.41. – 30.12.41.) | Dmitry Timofeyevich Kozlov | Caucasian Front |
| Northern Front | Leningrad Front (27.8.41. – 24.7.45.) | Markian Popov, Kliment Voroshilov, Georgy Zhukov, Ivan Fedyuninski , Mikhail Khozin, Leonid Govorov | Leningrad Military District |
| Northern Front | Karelian Front (1.9.41. – 15.11.44.) | Valerian Frolov, Kirill Meretskov | disbanded after Finland exited the war, Front HQ used for the formation of the Primorsky Group of Forces that would become the 1st Far Eastern Front for the liberation of Manchuria |
| Mozhaysk Line of Defence Front | Moscow Reserve Front (9.10.41. – 12.10.41.) | Pavel Artemyev (NKVD) | absorbed into the Western Front |
| 22, 29, 30 and 31st Armies of the Western Front | Kalinin Front (19.10.41. – 20.10.43.) | Ivan Konev, Maksim Purkayev, Andrey Yeryomenko | 1st Baltic Front |
| mobilised reserves of the Moscow Military District | Moscow Defence Zone (3.12.41. – 1.10.43.) | Pavel Artemyev (NKVD) | after the German advance was stopped and the threat to Moscow was evaded, it became a training command for conscripts, its HQ was used to reestablish the Belorussian Military District in October 1943 |
| left flank of the Leningrad Front and STAVKA Reserve formations | Volkhov Front (I) (17.12.41. – 23.4.42.) | Kirill Meretskov | reintegrated into the Leningrad Front as its Volkhov Direction Army Group |
| Lt.-Gen. Kostenko's Task Group | Bryansk Front (II) (24.12.41. – 12.3.43.) | Yakov Cherevichenko, Filipp Golikov, Nikandr Chibisov, Konstantin Rokossovsky, Max Reyter | Reserve Front (II.) |
| Transcaucasian Front | Caucasian Front (30.12.41. – 28.1.42.) | Dmitry Timofeyevich Kozlov | Crimean Front and Transcaucasian Military District |
1942
| Caucasian Front | Crimean Front (28.1.42 – 19.5.42.) | Dmitry Timofeyevich Kozlov | after its destruction its remnants absorbed into the North Caucasian Front |
| Transcaucasian Military District re-mobilised after the destruction of the Crimean Front | Transcaucasian Front (II) (15.5.42. – 25.8.45.) | Ivan Tyulenev | Tbilisi Military District |
| remnants of the Crimean Front and the Southern Front | North Caucasian Front (I) (20.5.42. – 3.9.42.) | Semyon Budyonny | Black Sea Army Group |
| Volkhov Direction Army Group of the Leningrad Front | Volkhov Front (II) (8.6.42. – 15.2.44.) | Kirill Meretskov | disbanded |
| part of the Bryansk Front (II) | Voronezh Front (9.7.42. – 20.10.43.) | Filipp Golikov, Nikolai Vatutin | 1st Ukrainian Front |
| part of the Southwestern Front (I) | Stalingrad Front (I) (12.7.42. – 30.9.42.) | Semyon Timoshenko, Vasiliy Gordov, Andrey Yeryomenko | Don Front |
| part of the Stalingrad Front (I) | Southeastern Front (7.8.42. – 30.9.42.) | Andrey Yeryomenko | Stalingrad Front (II) |
| Stalingrad Front (I) | Don Front (30.9.42. – 15.2.43.) | Konstantin Rokossovsky | Central Front (II) |
| Southeastern Front | Stalingrad Front (II) (30.9.42. – 31.12.42.) | Andrey Yeryomenko | Southern Front (II) |
| reserve formations | Southwestern Front (II) (25.10.42. – 20.10.43.) | Nikolai Vatutin | 3rd Ukrainian Front |
1943
| Stalingrad Front (II) | Southern Front (II) (1.1.43. – 20.10.43.) | Andrey Yeryomenko, Rodion Malinovsky, Fyodor Tolbukhin | 4th Ukrainian Front (I) |
| reserve formations | North Caucasian Front (II) (24.1.43. – 20.11.43.) | Ivan Maslennikov, Ivan Yefimovich Petrov | Separate Coastal Army |
| Don Front | Central Front (II) (15.2.43. – 20.10.43.) | Konstantin Rokossovsky | Belorussian Front (I) |
| Bryansk Front (II) | Reserve Front (II) (12.3.43. – 23.3.43.) | Max Reyter | Kursk Front |
| Reserve Front (II) | Kursk Front (23.3.43. – 27.3.43.) | Max Reyter | Oryol Front |
| Kursk Front | Oryol Front (27.3.43 – 28.3.43.) | Max Reyter | Bryansk Front (III) |
| Oryol Front | Bryansk Front (III) (28.3.43. – 10.10.43.) | Max Reyter, Markian Popov | Baltic Front |
| 41st Army | Reserve Front (III) (10.4.43. – 15.4.43.) | Markian Popov | Steppe Military District |
| Steppe Military District | Steppe Front (9.7.43. – 20.10.43.) | Ivan Konev | 2nd Ukrainian Front |
| Bryansk Front (III) | Baltic Front (15.10.43. – 20.10.43) | Markian Popov | 2nd Baltic Front |
| Kalinin Front | 1st Baltic Front (20.10.43. – 24.2.45.) | Andrey Yeryomenko, Ivan Bagramyan | Zemland Army Group under the 3rd Baltic Front |
| Baltic Front | 2nd Baltic Front (20.10.43. – 9.2.45.) | Markian Popov, Andrey Yeryomenko, Leonid Govorov | absorbed into the Leningrad Front |
| Central Front (II) | Belorussian Front (I) (20.10.43. – 23.2.44.) | Konstantin Rokossovsky | 1st Belorussian Front (I) |
| Voronezh Front | 1st Ukrainian Front (20.10.43. – 10.6.45.) | Nikolai Vatutin, Georgy Zhukov, Ivan Konev | Central Group of Forces |
| Steppe Front | 2nd Ukrainian Front (20.10.43. – 10.6.45.) | Ivan Konev, Rodion Malinovsky | Odessa Military District |
| Southwestern Front (II) | 3rd Ukrainian Front (20.10.43. – 15.6.45.) | Rodion Malinovsky, Fyodor Tolbukhin | Southern Group of Forces |
| Southern Front | 4th Ukrainian Front (I) (20.10.43. – 15.5.44.) | Fyodor Tolbukhin | disbanded, formations transferred to STAVKA Reserve |
1944
| Belorussian Front (I) | 1st Belorussian Front (I) (24.2.44. – 5.4.44.) | Konstantin Rokossovsky | Belorussian Front (II) |
| Northwestern Front | 2nd Belorussian Front (I) (24.2.44. – 5.4.44.) | Pavel Kurochkin | absorbed into Belorussian Front (II) |
| 1st Belorussian Front (I) | Belorussian Front (II) (6.4.44. – 16.4.44.) | Konstantin Rokossovsky | 1st Belorussian Front (II) |
| Belorussian Front (II) | 1st Belorussian Front (II) (16.4.44. – 10.6.45.) | Konstantin Rokossovsky, Georgy Zhukov | Group of Soviet Occupation Forces in Germany |
| left flank of the Leningrad Front | 3rd Baltic Front (21.4.44. – 16.10.44.) | Ivan Maslennikov, | disbanded, formations split between STAVKA Reserve, Leningrad Front, 1st Baltic Front and 2nd Baltic Front |
| 10th Army | 2nd Belorussian Front (II) (24.4.44. – 10.6.45.) | Ivan Yefimovich Petrov, Georgiy Zakharov, Konstantin Rokossovsky | Northern Group of Forces |
| Western Front | 3rd Belorussian Front (24.4.44. – 15.8.45.) | Ivan Chernyakhovsky, Aleksandr Vasilevsky, Ivan Bagramyan | Baranovichy Military District |
| formations from STAVKA Reserve | 4th Ukrainian Front (II) (5.8.44. – 31.7.45.) | Fyodor Tolbukhin, Ivan Yefimovich Petrov, Andrey Yeryomenko | Carpathian Military District |
| Notes: | (I), (II) and (III) represents the time the designation was used. | | |

- Baltic Fronts
  - 1st Baltic Front: Formed from Kalinin Front late 1943.
  - 2nd Baltic Front: Formed from Bryansk Front on 10 October 1943.
  - 3rd Baltic Front
- Bryansk Front – Created 18 December 1941, to take sector between the Western and Southwestern Fronts. Disbanded 11/12 March 1943. Reformed from Orel Front 28 March 1943.
- Belorussian Fronts (alternative spellings are Byelorussian Front and Belarusian Front)
  - 1st Belorussian Front
  - 2nd Belorussian Front
  - 3rd Belorussian Front
- Caucasus Front
- Central Front
- Crimean Front – formed January 1942 to reconquer the Crimea, incorporating 44th, 47th, and 51st Armies
- Don Front
- Far East Front
  - 1st Far East Front
  - 2nd Far East Front
- Kalinin Front – the Kalinin Front was formally established by Stavka directive on 17 October 1941, and allocated three armies – 22nd, 29th and 30th. Renamed 1st Baltic Front Oct–Dec 1943.
- Karelian Front – formed from Northern Front, along with Leningrad Front, on 23 August 1941.
- Kursk Front
- Leningrad Front – formed from Northern Front, along with Karelian Front, on 23 August 1941.
- Moscow Defence Zone
- Moscow Reserve Front
- Mozhaysk Line of Defense
- North Caucasus Front – redesignated TC Front's Black Sea Group of Forces, 1 September 1942
- Northern Front – formed from Leningrad Military District on 24 June 1941
- Northwestern Front – formed from Baltic Special Military District on 22 June 1941
- Orel Front – created 24 March 1943 to defend opposite the tip of the German salient east of Orel. Composed of Western Front's 61st Army, Central Front's 3rd Army, and 15th Air Army. Redesignated Bryansk Front 28 March 1943.
- Primorsky Group of Forces
- Reserve Front – Front of Reserve Armies formed 14 July 1941
- Southeastern Front – formed from armies on Stalingrad Front's left wing, 7 August 1942. Redesignated Stalingrad Front 28 September 1942.
- Southern Front – renamed 4th Ukrainian Front 20 October 1943.
- Southwestern Front – Formed initially on 22 June 1941. Reestablished 22 October 1942 between Don and Voronezh Fronts. Renamed 3rd Ukrainian Front 20 October 1943.
- Stalingrad Front – Along with Voronezh Front, formed from remnants of Southwestern Front July 1942. Became Don Front 28 September 1942.
- Steppe Front – renamed 2nd Ukrainian Front 20 October 1943.
- Transbaikal Front
- Transcaucasian Front – formed 23 August 1941
- Ukrainian Fronts
  - 1st Ukrainian Front
  - 2nd Ukrainian Front
  - 3rd Ukrainian Front
  - 4th Ukrainian Front
- Volkhov Front – formed 17 December 1941
- Voronezh Front – renamed 1st Ukrainian Front 20 October 1943.
- Western Front – formed from Western Special Military District on 22 June 1941

For constituent armies see List of Soviet armies.

== Soviet fronts after World War II ==
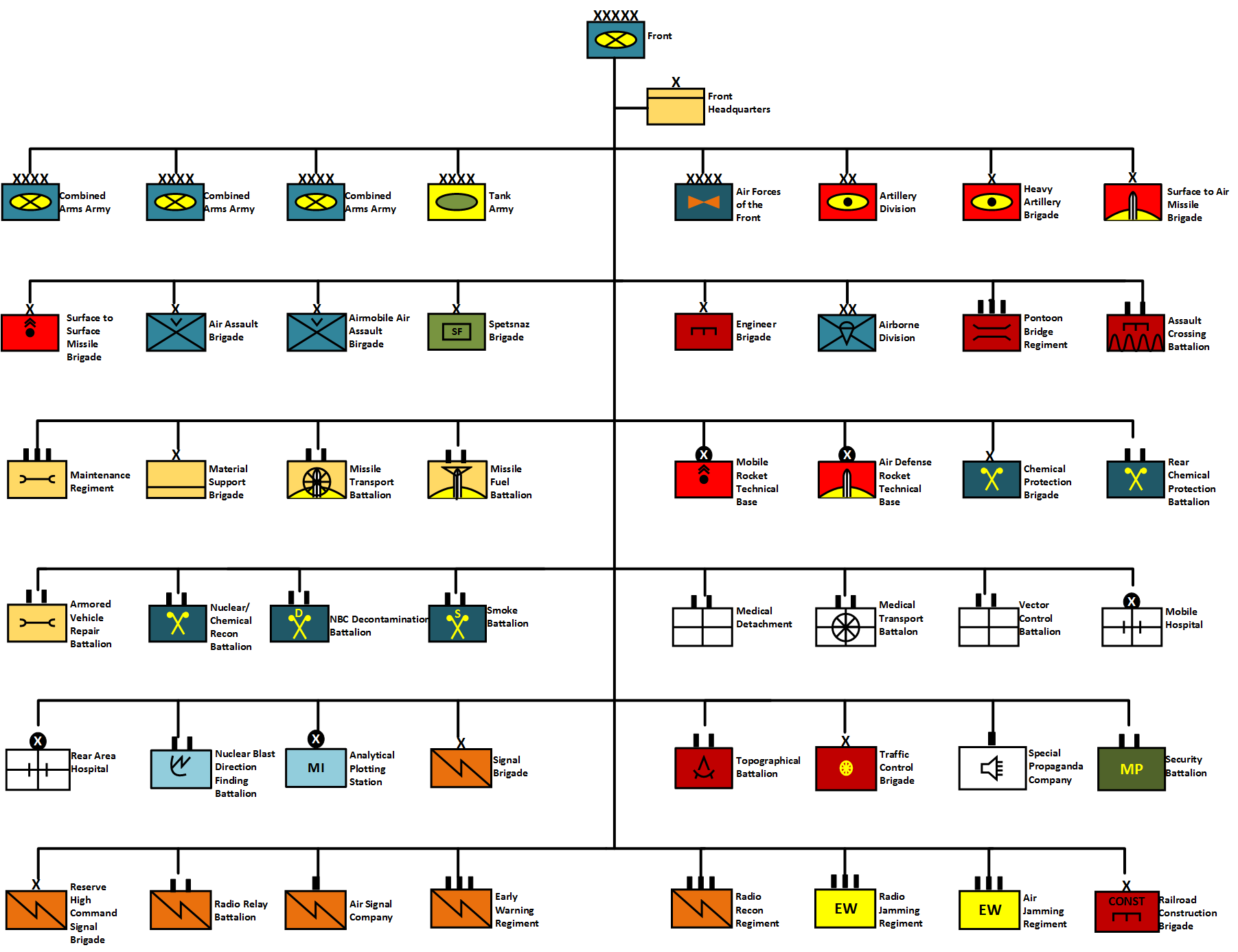
Soviet Front 1980s

The Soviet Army maintained contingencies for establishing fronts in the event of war. During the Cold War, fronts and their staffs became groups of Soviet forces in the Warsaw Pact organization. The front was to be the highest operational command during wartime. Though there was no front ever established during peacetime the basic building blocks were maintained the established Military Districts. A front generally comprised 3–4 Combined Arms Armies and 1–2 Tank Armies though there was no set organization.

== Poland ==
A number of fronts were created by the Second Polish Republic from 1918 to 1939, among them being the Polish Southern Front. See pl:Kategoria:Fronty polskie. In addition, the creation of a Polish Front was considered to group the First and Second Armies of the Polish Armed Forces in the East in 1944, and during the Warsaw Pact period, a Polish Front was created, seemingly as a mobilization-only organization.
