= Kursk Front =

Russian front during World War II

- Active: March 23, 1943 – March 27, 1943
- Country: Soviet Union
- Branch: Red Army
- Type: Army Group Command
- Size: Several Armies
- Engagements: World War II

Commanders
- Notable commanders: Max Reyter

The Kursk Front was a front of the Red Army during the Second World War.

It was set up on March 23, 1943, following a Stavka directive of March 19 by re-purposing the command cadre of Reserve Front to defend the westernmost sector of the Kursk Salient. It consisted of 38th Army, 60th Army, and 15th Air Army, with another field army to be assigned, probably either the 63rd or 66th. Col. Gen. M.A. Reiter was appointed to command, with Maj. Gen. I.Z. Susaikov as member of the military council and Lt. Gen. L.M. Sandalov as chief of staff.

The new Front was very short lived. Another Stavka directive on March 24 transformed Kursk Front into the new Oryol Front, to be established by March 27. At the same time, 60th Army was transferred to Central Front, and 38th to Voronezh Front. Finally, on March 28, Oryol Front was ordered to be renamed as the new Bryansk Front.
