= Max Reyter =

Russian and Soviet general (1886–1950)

Max Andreyevich Reyter
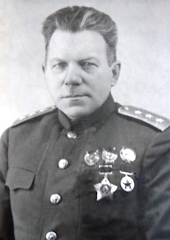
- Born: 24 April [O.S. 12 April] 1886; Sirgen, Kreis Windau, Courland Governorate, Russian Empire
- Died: 6 April 1950 (aged 63); Moscow, Russian SFSR, Soviet Union
- Military career
- Allegiance: Russia (1906–1917); Russian SFSR (1919–1922); Soviet Union (1922–1950)
- Branch: Imperial Russian Army; Red Army; Soviet Army
- Service years: 1906–1917; 1919–1950
- Rank: Colonel-general
- Commands: 20th Army (1942); Bryansk / Reserve Front (1942–1943); South Ural Military District (1943–1945)
- Conflicts: World War I; Russian Civil War; World War II
- Awards: Order of Lenin; Order of Suvorov, 1st class Order of the Red Banner (4x) and other awards

Max Andreyevich Reyter (Russian: Макс Андре́евич Ре́йтер; Latvian: Mārtiņš Reiters; 24 April 1886 [O.S. 12 April] – 6 April 1950) (Note: Alternative transliterations found in English-language sources include Reiter and Reuter.) was a Russian and Soviet military officer of Latvian origin.

A lieutenant-general in the Red Army at the time of the Nazi invasion of the Soviet Union, Reyter was a commander of the 20th Army and the commander-in-chief for the Bryansk Front in 1942–1943. Promoted to colonel-general in 1943, he headed the South Ural Military District September 1943 to July 1945.

== Biography ==
Max Andreyevich Reyter was born to peasant Latvian parents in Sirgen, Kreis Windau, Courland Governorate, Russian Empire (in present-day Ziras, Ventspils Municipality, Latvia) on 24 April [O.S. 12 April] 1886, Max Reyter voluntarily joined the Imperial Russian Army in 1906. He graduated from the Irkutsk Military School in 1910. During World War I he commanded a company, battalion in the Caucasus Front, and was an officer for assignments at the army headquarters on the Western Front. A colonel in the Russian Army at the time of its collapse before the advancing German Army in 1917–1918, Reyter was captured by Germans at the front and taken to a German prisoner-of-war camp in East Prussia in February 1918. He sided with the Bolsheviks after returning to Russia, and joined the Red Army in 1919.

In the Russian Civil War he fought in Northern Front as the regiment's adjutant. Later appointed as assistant regimental commander and then as Commander of the regiment. In 1920, he fought in the Polish-Soviet war. He took part in the suppression of the 1921 Kronstadt Uprising. As the 97th regimental commander he was awarded with his first Order of the Red Banner. In 1921, as the Rifle Brigade commander, then as the 11th Infantry Division commander assistant in 1922 and awarded the second Order of the Red Banner. and joined the Bolshevik Party in 1922. From the 1924 to 1929 he was the 2nd Priamurskoj Infantry Division and later the 30th Infantry Division commander. In 1929 he participated in the battles of the Chinese-Eastern Railway to the Zhang Xueliang's troops of Republic of China. In 1932 he was appointed as the 73rd Infantry Division Commander of Siberian Military District. He joined the General Staff after graduating from the Frunze Military Academy in November 1935. He served as head of Third Department of Fighting Training Administration in the Red Army from 1936 to 1939. From January 1940 he was Commander Assistant of North Caucasus Military District, then Deputy Commander and promoted to Lieutenant General in July 1940.

He was deputy commander for the rear of the Central and Bryansk Fronts from August to December 1941, assistant to the commander of the Western Front from February to March 1942, and commander of the 20th Army of the Western Front from March to September 1942.

Reyter served as commander of the Bryansk Front from 28 September 1942 until 12 March 1943, Reserve Front on 12–23 March 1943, Kursk Front on 23–27 March 1943, Oryol Front on 27–28 March 1943, and Bryansk Front on 28 March – 6 May 1943.

Reyter was promoted from lieutenant-general to colonel-general in January 1943. He was the deputy commander of the Voronezh Front from August to September 1943, and the commanding officer of the South Ural Military District from September 1943 to July 1945.

He headed the Vystrel senior officers course (from Выстрел, Russian for shot) of the Soviet Army from 1946 to January 1950.

He died in Moscow on 6 March 1950.
