= Southeastern Front =

- Active: August 5, 1942 – September 28, 1942
- Country: Soviet Union
- Branch: Red Army
- Type: Army Group Command
- Size: Several Armies
- Engagements: World War II; Case Blue

Commanders
- Notable commanders: Andrey Yeryomenko

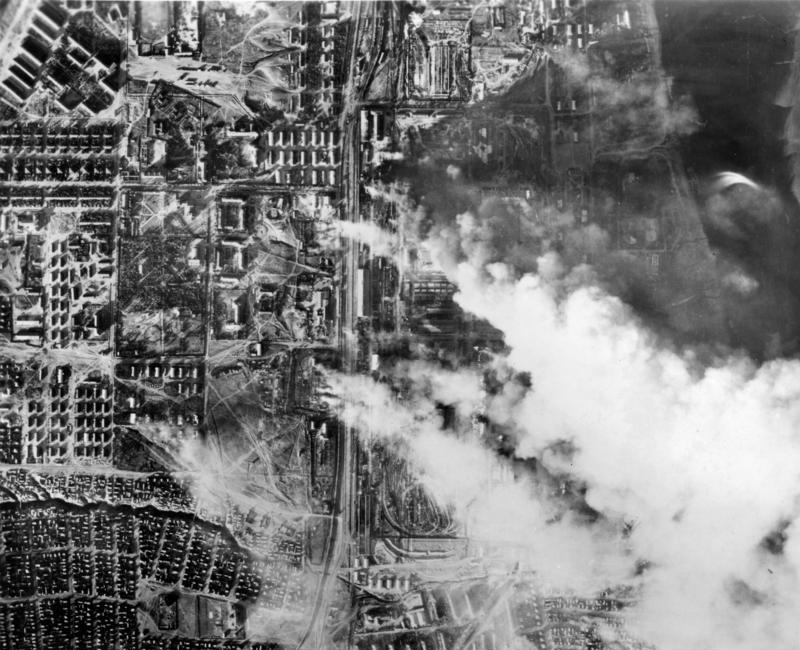
Aerial view of Volgograd, September, 1942

The Southeastern Front was a front of the Red Army during World War II.

It was formed on August 5, 1942, out of parts of the Stalingrad Front, using the command elements from the First Tank Army and the disbanded Southern Front. The front's main aim was to prevent the German advance towards the Volga River and ward off the threat of a German encirclement of Stalingrad.

For this purpose it included :

- 52nd Army (Vsevolod Yakovlev),
- 57th Army (Fyodor Tolbukhin),
- 64th Army(Vasily Chuikov) .

Were later added to the forces of the front :

- 28th Army (Vasyl Herasymenko),
- 62nd Army (Anton Lopatin),
- 8th Air Army (Timofey Khryukin).

On September 28 the Southeastern Front was disbanded; most of its forces became the new Stalingrad Front, whilst the former Stalingrad Front was renamed the Don Front.

== Commanders ==
- Colonel-General Andrey Yeryomenko;
- Brigadekomissar V. M. Layok (Member of the Military Council - August 1942);
- Communist Party of Ukraine (Soviet Union) Central Committee Secretary Nikita Khrushchev (Member of the Military Council, August–September 1942);
- Major General G. F. Sakharov (Chief of Staff, August–September 1942).
