= Moscow Defence Zone =

Military unit

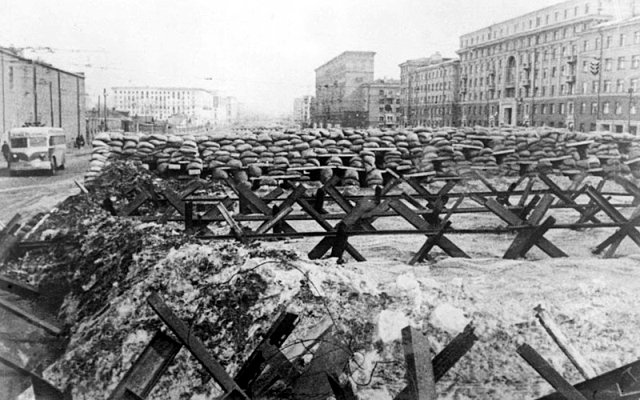
Barricades on a Moscow street, in autumn-winter of 1941.

The Moscow Defence Zone was a front of the Red Army during World War II to defend Moscow from the German advance. It was set up on 2 December 1941 to manage the troops of 24th and 60th Armies and part of the anti-aircraft defences.

== History ==
The Moscow Defence Zone was established on December 2, 1941. It controlled the armies earmarked for the defence of Moscow, the 24th and 60th Armies.
