= Andrey Yeryomenko =

Soviet general (1892–1970)

- Russian: Андрей Иванович Ерёменко
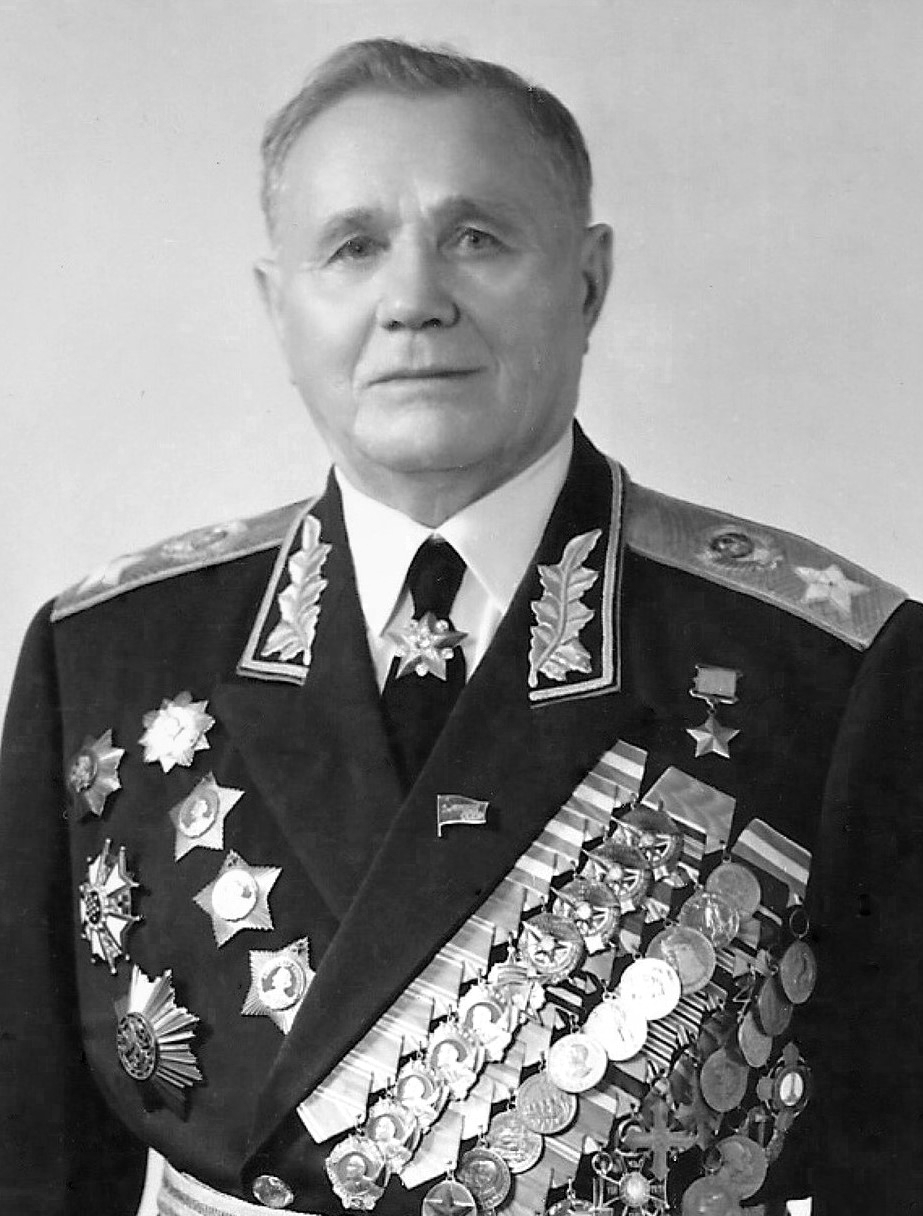
- Portrait, c. 1968–1970
- Born: October 14, 1892; Markivka, Kharkov Governorate, Russian Empire (now Ukraine)
- Died: November 19, 1970 (aged 78); Moscow, Russian SFSR, Soviet Union
- Burial place: Kremlin Wall Necropolis
- Military career
- Allegiance: Russian Empire (1913–1917); Russian SFSR (1917–1922); Soviet Union (1922–1958)
- Branch: Imperial Russian Army; Red Army
- Service years: 1913–1958
- Rank: Marshal of the Soviet Union
- Commands: North Caucasus Military District; Western Front; Bryansk Front; 4th Shock Army; Stalingrad Front; Kalinin Front; 1st Baltic Front; Separate Coastal Army; 2nd Baltic Front; 4th Ukrainian Front; Carpathian Military District
- Conflicts: World War I; Romanian campaign; Russian Civil War; World War II; Soviet invasion of Poland; Great Patriotic War; Battle of Smolensk; Battle of Moscow; Toropets–Kholm offensive; Battle of Stalingrad; Operation Uranus; Battle of Nevel; Crimean offensive; Baltic offensive; Moravia–Ostrava offensive; Prague offensive
- Awards: Hero of the Soviet Union; Hero of Czechoslovakia; Order of Lenin (5); Order of the Red Banner (4); Order of the October Revolution; Order of Suvorov, 1st Class (3); Order of Kutuzov, 1st Class

Andrey Ivanovich Yeryomenko (Note: Also transliterated as Yeremenko and Eremenko) (Russian: Андре́й Ива́нович Ерёменко; Ukrainian: Андрій Іванович Єрьоменко; 14 October [O.S. 2 October] 1892 – November 19, 1970) was a Soviet general during World War II and Marshal of the Soviet Union. During the war, Yeryomenko commanded the Southeastern Front (later renamed the Stalingrad Front) during the Battle of Stalingrad in summer 1942 and planned the successful defense of the city. He later commanded the armies responsible for the liberation of Western Hungary and Eastern Czechoslovakia in 1945.

== Military career ==
=== Draft and early service ===
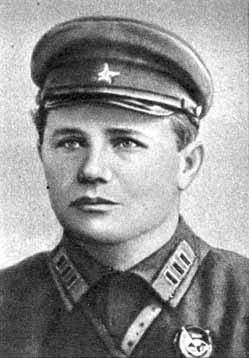
Andrey Yeryomenko as regimental commander ca.1929

A Ukrainian, Yeryomenko was born in Markivka in Kharkov Governorate (today in Ukraine) to a peasant family, Yeryomenko was drafted into the Imperial Army in 1913, serving on the Southwest and Romanian fronts during World War I. He joined the Red Army in 1918, where he served in the legendary Budyonny Cavalry (First Cavalry Army). He attended the Leningrad Cavalry School and then the Frunze Military Academy, graduating in 1935. In addition to his education, he was appointed to command of a regiment of cavalry in December 1929, then a division in 1937, and then the 6th Cavalry Corps in 1938.

=== World War II ===
On September 17, 1939, Yeryomenko led his 6th Cavalry Corps into eastern Poland as part of the operations agreed to between Germany and the Soviet Union under the Molotov–Ribbentrop Pact. In general, this Soviet operation was not efficiently organized. Yeryomenko (whose Corps contained light tank and other motorized elements) was forced to request an emergency airlift of fuel so as to continue his advance. Despite these difficulties, the Corps kept moving, and Yeryomenko earned the nickname "the Russian Guderian".

Yeryomenko was given command of the prestigious 1st Red Banner Far Eastern Army, deep in eastern Siberia, where he was serving at the outbreak of Operation Barbarossa on June 22, 1941.

Eight days after the invasion began, Yeryomenko was recalled to Moscow, where he was made the Acting Commander of the Soviet Western Front, two days after its original commander, General of the Army Dmitri Pavlov, was dismissed (and later convicted and executed) for incompetence. Yeryomenko was thrust into a very precarious position. The Nazi Blitzkrieg approach to warfare quickly dominated the Western Front, but Yeryomenko motivated the remaining troops, and halted the German offensive just outside Smolensk. During this vicious defensive Battle of Smolensk, Yeryomenko was wounded. Because of his injuries, he was transferred to command the newly created Bryansk Front.

In late August, Yeryomenko was ordered to launch counter-offensive operations along the Bryansk Front, primarily against Guderian's Second Panzer Group as it began to move south to trap Kirponos' Southwestern Front around Kiev. Stavka, particularly Stalin and Shaposhnikov, seemed convinced that Yeryomenko could block or distract Guderian's drive and save Kiev from encirclement. The counter-offensive failed to accomplish its objectives despite a valiant effort, leaving Bryansk Front severely weakened.

In October, the Germans launched Operation Typhoon, which was an offensive aimed at capturing Moscow. Most of Yeryomenko's weakened forces (3rd, 13th and 50th Armies) were partially encircled by 8 October although small units managed to escape for days or weeks following. On 13 October, Yeryomenko was once again wounded, this time severely. He was evacuated to a military hospital in Moscow, where he spent several weeks recovering. In January 1942, Yeryomenko was appointed commander of the 4th Shock Army, part of the Northwestern Front. During the Soviet Winter Counteroffensive, Yeryomenko's army was part of the highly successful Toropets–Kholm Offensive, which liberated Toropets and much of the surrounding region, helping to create the Rzhev Salient, which became a major battlefield over the next 15 months. On 20 January 1942, Yeryomenko was again wounded, this time in one leg, when German planes bombed his headquarters. Yeryomenko refused to evacuate to a hospital until the battle surrounding him finished.

==== Battle of Stalingrad ====
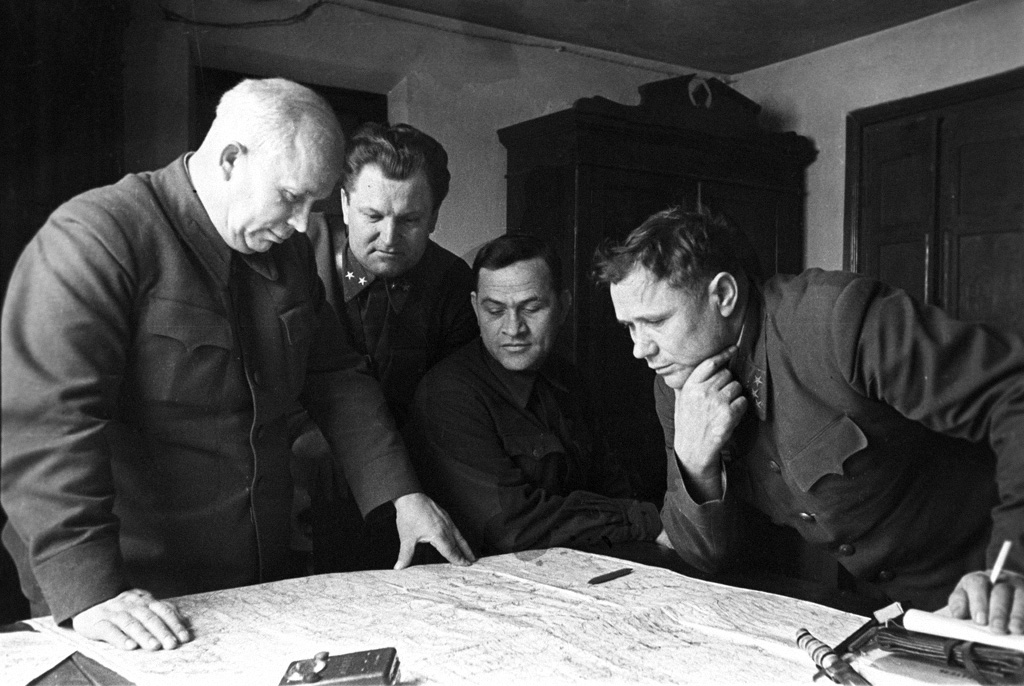
General Yeryomenko (right) as the commander of the Stalingrad Front, with Nikita Khrushchev (left), Chief Commissar of the Stalingrad Front, December 1942

Yeryomenko's performance in the winter offensives restored Stalin's confidence, and he was given command of the Southeastern Front on 1 August 1942, where he proceeded to launch powerful counterattacks against the German offensive into the Caucasus, Fall Blau. Yeryomenko and Commissar Nikita Khrushchev planned the defense of Stalingrad, rallying and re-organizing men and equipment falling back to the city from the Don River and the steppes to the west. When one of his subordinates, Gen. Anton Lopatin, doubted if his 62nd Army would be able to defend Stalingrad, Yeryomenko replaced him with Lt. Gen. Vasily Chuikov as Army commander on 11 September 1942. Chuikov and the 62nd Army went on to prove themselves as the defenders of the city, confirming Yeryomenko's judgement. On 28 September, the Southeastern Front was renamed the Stalingrad Front.

During Operation Uranus, November 1942, Yeryomenko's forces helped to surround the German 6th Army from the south, linking up with the northern penetration at Kalach-na-Donu. German General Erich von Manstein soon attempted to counterattack the Soviet forces and break through the line to relieve the surrounded Germans. Yeryomenko successfully repelled the attack, largely with the forces of the 2nd Guards Army along their fall-back positions on the Myshkova River.

==== After Stalingrad ====
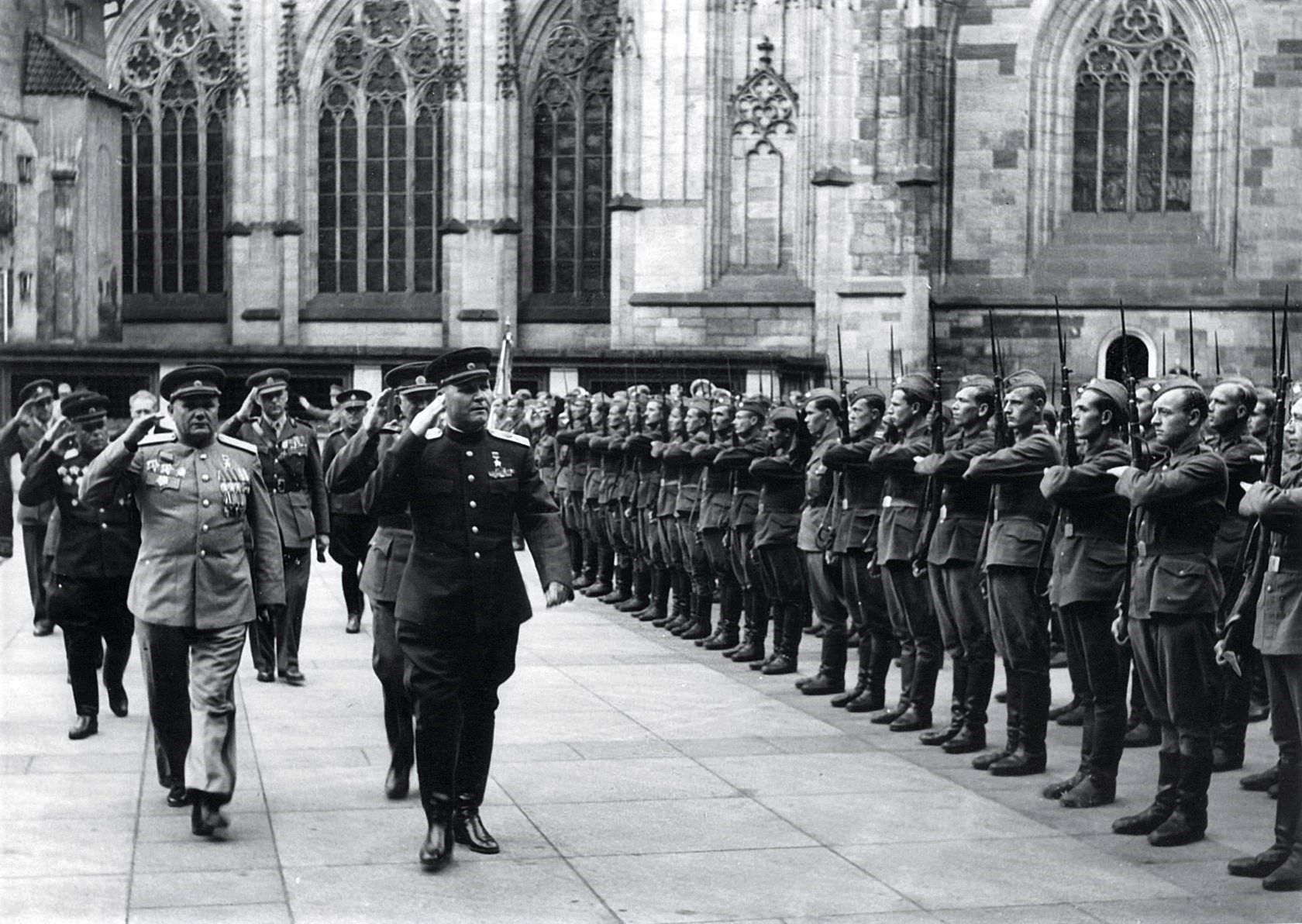
Yeryomenko and Ivan Konev in liberated Prague on 6 June 1945

On January 1, 1943, the Stalingrad Front was renamed Southern Front. After the end of the winter offensive, in March 1943, Yeryomenko was transferred north to the Kalinin Front, which remained relatively quiet until September, when Yeryomenko launched a small, but successful offensive. In December, Yeryomenko was once again sent south, this time to take command of the Separate Coastal Army, which was put together to retake Crimea, which was accomplished with assistance from Fyodor Tolbukhin's 4th Ukrainian Front. In April, Yeryomenko once again was sent north, to command the 2nd Baltic Front. During the summer campaign, 2nd Baltic was very successful in crushing German opposition, and was able to capture Riga, helping to bottle up some 30 German divisions in Latvia. On March 26, 1945, Yeryomenko was transferred to the command of the 4th Ukrainian Front, the unit he controlled until the end of the war. Fourth Ukrainian Front was positioned in Eastern Hungary. Yeryomenko's subsequent offensive helped capture the rest of Hungary, and paved the way for the Soviet liberation of Czechoslovakia. His army liberated many cities and towns in Czechoslovakia, most notably Ostrava. Today, many streets in the Czech Republic bear his name.

== Post-war career ==
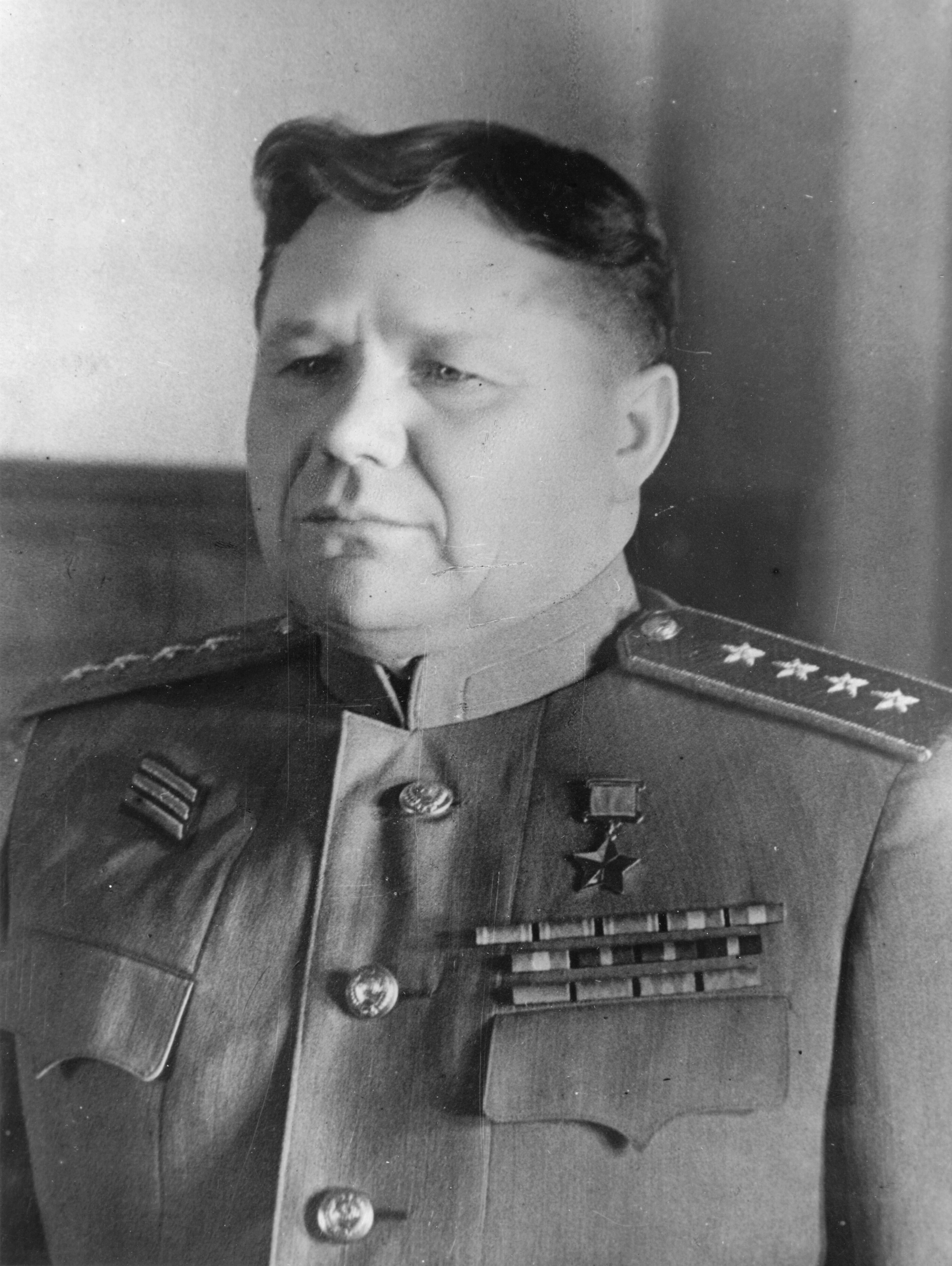
Yeryomenko in uniform c. 1945–1949

After the war, Yeryomenko had three major commands: in 1945–1946, he was the Commander in Chief of the Carpathian Military District. In 1946–1952 he was the Commander in Chief of the Western Siberian Military District. In 1953–1958 he was the Commander in Chief of the North Caucasus Military District. On March 11, 1955, Yeryomenko along with five other noteworthy commanders, was given the rank of Marshal of the Soviet Union. He was made Inspector General for the Ministry of Defense in 1958, a largely ceremonial role that allowed him to retire that same year.

Yeryomenko died on November 19, 1970, at the age 78. The urn containing his ashes is buried in the Kremlin Wall Necropolis.

== Honours and awards ==
Soviet Union

- "Gold Star" Medal Hero of the Soviet Union (29 July 1944)
- Five Orders of Lenin (22 February 1938, 29 July 1944, 21 February 1945, 13 October 1962, 13 October 1967)
- Order of the October Revolution (22 February 1968)
- Order of the Red Banner, four times (15 June 1926, 22 February 1941, 3 November 1944, 20 June 1949)
- Order of Suvorov, 1st class, four times (23 January 1943, 16 May 1944, 23 May 1945)
- Order of Kutuzov, 1st class (22 September 1943)
- Honorary weapon with a National Emblem of the Soviet Union in gold (22 February 1968)
- Jubilee Medal "XX Years of the Workers' and Peasants' Red Army"

Foreign Awards

- Hero of the Czechoslovak Socialist Republic (28 April 1970)
- Legion of Merit, Chief Commander (USA)
- Order of Klement Gottwald
- Honorary Citizen of Volgograd (4 May 1970), Smolensk, Daugavpils (27 July 1964) and Ostrava (Czech Republic)

== Commands ==
Military offices
Preceded by Unidentified	Commanding Officer of the 14th Cavalry Division; 1937–1938	Succeeded by Unidentified
Preceded by Unidentified	Commanding General of the 6th Cavalry Corps; 1938–1940	Succeeded by Unidentified
Preceded by Unit created	Commanding General of the 3rd Mechanized Corps; 1940	Succeeded by Alexey Kurkin
Preceded by Fyodor Kuznetsov	Commanding General of the North Caucasus Military District; 1940–1941	Succeeded by Ivan Konev
Preceded by Markian Popov	Commanding General of the 1st Red Banner Army; January–June 1941	Succeeded by Vasily Vasilyev
Preceded by Army General Dmitry Pavlov	Commanding General of the Western Front; 28 June – 2 July 1941	Succeeded by Marshal Timoshenko, Yeryomenko as vice commander of Western Front
Preceded by Newly formed	Commanding General of the Bryansk Front; 16 August – 13 October 1941	Succeeded by Major General Georgiy Fedorovich Zakharov
Preceded by 27th Army renamed as 4th Shock Army	Commanding General of the 4th Shock Army; 26 December 1941 – 13 February 1942	Succeeded by Lieutenant General Filipp Golikov
Preceded by Unidentified	Commanding General of the Southwestern Front; 1942 – 12 July 1942	Succeeded by Unidentified
Preceded by Newly formed	Commanding General of the Stalingrad Front; 12 July – 7 August 1942	Succeeded by Unidentified
Preceded by Newly formed by splitting the Stalingrad Front	Commanding General of the Southeastern Front; 7 August – 28 September 1942	Succeeded by Disbanded
Preceded by Reformed from Southeastern Front	Commanding General of the Stalingrad Front; 28 September 1942 – 1 January 1943	Succeeded by Unidentified
Preceded by Reformed from Stalingrad Front	Commanding General of the Southern Front; 1 January – February 1943	Succeeded by General Lieutenant Rodion Malinovsky
Preceded by Army General Maksim Purkayev	Commanding General of the Kalinin Front; 7 April – 12 October 1943	Succeeded by Renamed 1st Baltic Front
Preceded by Renamed from Kalinin Front	Commanding General of the 1st Baltic Front; 12 October – 19 November 1943	Succeeded by Army General Hovhannes Bagramyan
Preceded by Army General Ivan Yefimovich Petrov	Commanding General of the Separate Coastal Army; 3 February – 18 April 1944	Succeeded by Lieutenant General Kondrat Semenovich Melnik
Preceded by Army General Markian Popov	Commanding General of the 2nd Baltic Front; 23 April 1944 – February 1945	Succeeded by 2nd Baltic Front was merged into Leningrad Front
Preceded by Army General Ivan Yefimovich Petrov	Commanding General of the 4th Ukrainian Front; 26 March – 25 August 1945	Succeeded by Re-designated as Carpathian Military District
Preceded by Newly formed from 4th Ukrainian Front	Commanding General of the Carpathian Military District; 25 August 1945 – October 1946	Succeeded by Colonel General K. N. Galytskyy
Preceded by General Lieutenant V. I. Kurdyumov	Commanding General of the Western Siberian Military District; October 1946 – November 1953	Succeeded by Disbanded to form Siberian Military District
Preceded by Colonel General S. G. Trofimenko	Commanding General of the North Caucasus Military District; November 1953 – April 1958	Succeeded by Army General Issa Alexandrovich Pliyev
Preceded by Unidentified	Inspector General of the Ministry of Defense; April 1958	Succeeded by Unidentified
