= Mozhaisk Line of Defence =

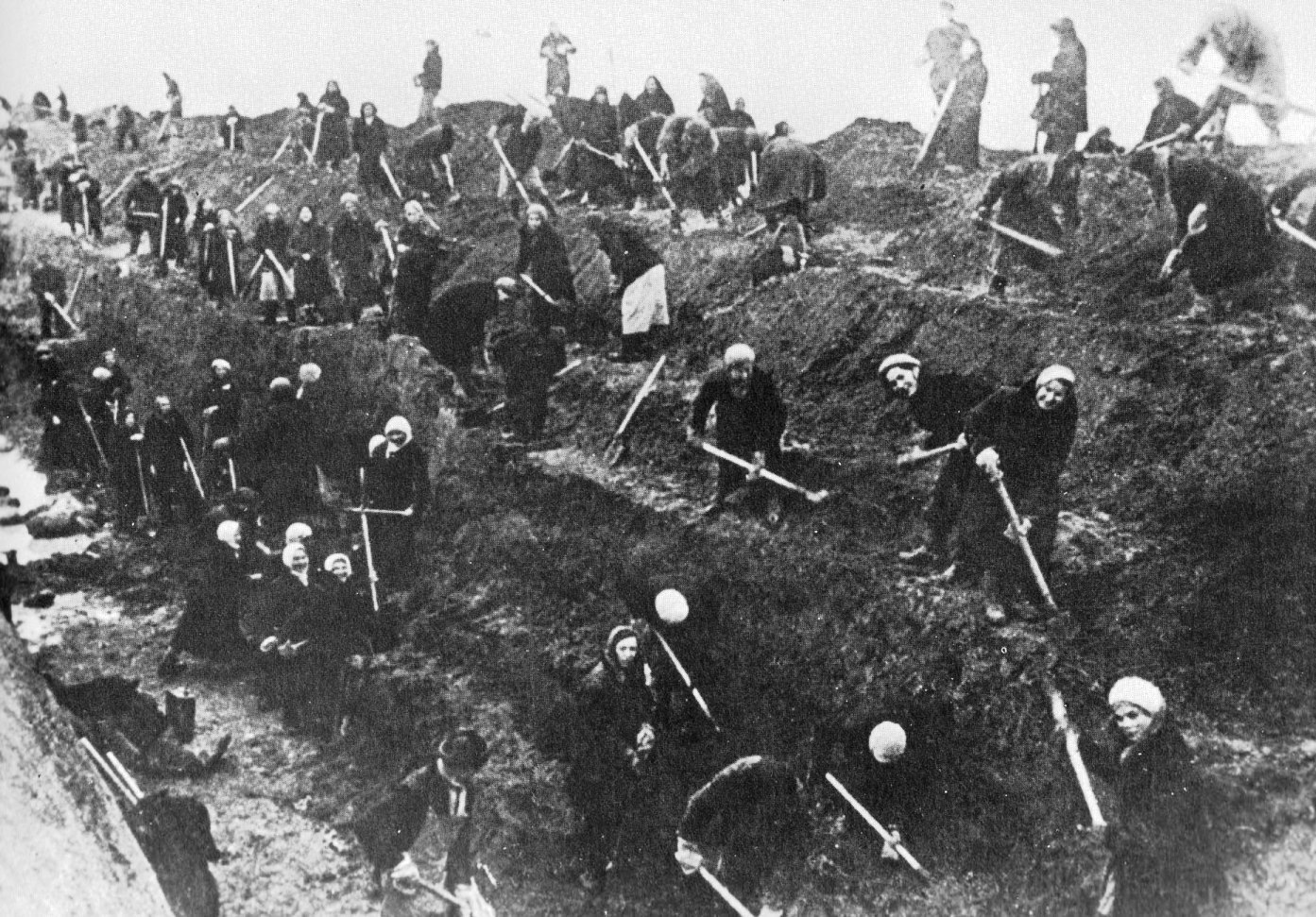
The Line of Defence during the Battle of Moscow.

The Mozhaisk Line of Defence was a front of the Red Army during the Second World War. It was ordered to be established within five days by decree 172 of the State Defence Committee on 16 July 1941. Colonel General Pavel Artemyev, commander of the Moscow Military District, was appointed to command the line of defence on 18 July and held the position throughout its brief existence.

On 19 July 1941 it was set up to organise the defence of Moscow and on 30 July 1941 it was dissolved and its forces transferred to the Reserve Front.
