= Oryol Front =

- Active: March 27, 1943 - March 28, 1943
- Country: Soviet Union
- Branch: Red Army
- Type: Army Group Command
- Size: Several Armies
- Engagements: World War II

Commanders
- Notable commanders: Max Reyter

The Oryol Front was very briefly a front of the Red Army during the Second World War.

By a Stavka order of March 24, 1943 it was set up on March 27 by renaming the Kursk Front, while most of the forces of that Front were reassigned elsewhere. It was intended that the Front would consist of the 61st Army from Western Front and 3rd Army from Central Front, plus one additional army. The command staff remained as for Kursk Front, with Col. Gen. Maks Andreevich Reiter in command.

Following yet another Stavka command in the early hours of March 28 Oryol Front was renamed Bryansk Front.
