= Ivan Kamera =

Soviet officer

Ivan Pavlvovich Kamera
- Born: 27 December 1897
- Died: 21 January 1952 (aged 54)
- Military career
- Allegiance: Soviet Russia (1918 - 1922); Soviet Union (1922–1944)
- Branch: Red Army
- Rank: Colonel-general of the Artillery
- Commands: Artillery Commander, 19th Army; Artillery Commander, Soviet Western Front
- Conflicts: Russian Civil War; World War II; Yartsevo Counterattack; Battle of Moscow; Battle of Kursk
- Awards: Order of Lenin

Ivan Pavlovich Kamera (Russian: Ива́н Па́влович Каме́ра; 27 December 1897 [O.S. 15 December] – 21 January 1952) was a Soviet military officer who held several commands as an artillery general during World War II, most notably during the Soviet counterattack at Yartsevo (near Smolensk) and as artillery chief for the Soviet Union's Western Front (Army Group).

Promoted to colonel-general of the artillery in July 1943, Kamera was subsequently relieved of command following an April 1944 State Defense Committee report harshly critical of both the artillery performance of the Front and of the leadership of its most senior officers.

== Biography ==
An ethnic Belarusian, Kamera was born in 1897. His career as a professional soldier in the Soviet armed forces began during the Russian Civil War (1917–1923). Already a member of the Bolsheviks’ Red Guard during the revolutionary events of 1917, Kamera joined the Bolshevik Party and the newly organized Red Army of the Russian Socialist Federative Soviet Republic in 1918.

A professional military man during the interwar decades in the Soviet Union, Kamera served in the artillery of the Red Army in the Soviet Union's Far East during 1929. He finished a set of army commanders' tactical courses in 1936 and held a series of artillery commands in the Soviet Army's divisions and corps in the 1930s.

He was assigned the army rank of major-general of the artillery following the introduction of the general officer ranks into the Soviet military ranks in 1940.

=== In World War II ===
Initially the commanding artillery officer of the Red Army's 10th Rifle Corps during peacetime in 1941, Kamera was assigned to a series of commands in the Red Army's artillery following the June 1941 surprise invasion of the Soviet Union by Nazi Germany.

As chief commander of the artillery within the 19th Army of the Soviet Union in July 1941, Kamera lost contact with the 19th Army during operations near Smolensk, but succeeded in assisting Konstantin Rokossovsky's improvized counterattack against the advancing forces of Germany's Army Group Center at the heights of Yartsevo in Smolensk Oblast. The successful counterattack temporarily retook control of the town from the German forces.

Subsequently, appointed chief commanding officer of the artillery for the Soviet Union's Western Front in November 1941, Kamera served under Front commanders Georgy Zhukov (1941–1942) and Ivan Konev (1942–1943). Awarded the rank of colonel-general on 5 July 1943, he served under Vasily Sokolovsky (1943–1944) until mid-April 1944 – just prior to the Front's 1944 reorganization as the 2nd and 3rd Belorussian Fronts.

Rokossovsky, recalling his experience with Kamera during the handling of the artillery at Yartsevo in his later memoirs, described Kamera as a remarkable commander; Soviet Artillery Marshal Nikolay Voronov also set down fond recollections, describing Kamera as a demanding commander regarded as a genuine authority by the artillerymen working under him. Kamera also became one of the higher-ranking Soviet Army officers to be decorated for heroism by the United States, receiving the United States Department of War's Distinguished Service Cross on behalf of Commander-in-Chief President Franklin D. Roosevelt on 6 January 1944.

Kamera was not as positively regarded by other military leaders – particularly as the Western Front failed to make significant advances for multiple months during the Soviet Army's pushback in 1943–1944. A joint report from the State Defense Committee, composed of Georgy Malenkov, colonel-generals Shcherbakov and Sergei Shtemenko, and lieutenant-generals Kuznetsov and Shimonayev, delivered to Joseph Stalin on 11 April 1944, criticized several generals and specifically faulted the performance of the artillery forces under Kamera's command—recommending his demotion in rank and replacement as artillery commander by another officer. Sokolovsky, Kamera, and other personnel were promptly relieved of their commands.

Kamera was already in poor health at the time, suffering from illness and paralysis that required hospitalization in early 1944. His wartime career was effectively over in such circumstances.

Kamera died on 21 January 1952.

== Awards and honors ==
Order of Lenin (21 March 1940)
Order of the Red Banner, twice (13 February 1930, 2 January 1942)
Order of Suvorov, 1st class (28 September 1943)
Order of Suvorov, 2nd class (9 April 1943)
Order of the Patriotic War, 1st class (18 November 1944)
Medal "For the Defence of Moscow" (1944)
Medal "For the Victory over Germany in the Great Patriotic War 1941–1945" (1945)
Jubilee Medal "XX Years of the Workers' and Peasants' Red Army" (1938)
Medal "In Commemoration of the 800th Anniversary of Moscow" (1947)
Distinguished Service Cross (United States)
