= Reserve of the Supreme High Command =

Soviet/Russian strategic military reserve command

The Reserve of the Supreme High Command (Russian: Резерв Верховного Главнокомандования; also known as the Stavka Reserve or RVGK (Russian: РВГК) or RGK (Russian: РГК — Резерв Главного Командования) comprises reserve military formations and units; the Stavka Reserve acted as the principal military reserve of the Soviet Red Army during World War II, and the RVGK now operates as part of the Russian Armed Forces under the control of the Supreme Commander-in-Chief of the Russian Armed Forces (Russian: Верховный главнокомандующий) — the President of the Russian Federation.

== Second World War ==
Forces from the Reserve were assigned by the Stavka (Supreme High Command) to individual fronts (army groups) that were conducting major operations. These formations were designed to support any forms of operations but especially penetrations and exploitations in accordance with the Soviet deep battle doctrine.

Beginning in 1943, the formations and units in the Reserve ranged from battalions to whole armies (e.g. the Reserve Armies), with an emphasis on artillery and mechanised formations, and were capable of large-scale, independent operations. For example, as of April 1943, an artillery penetration corps contained as many as 1,500 gun tubes and rocket launchers each. Tank armies, which also emerged in 1943, included one or two tank corps and one mechanised corps, plus supporting units. These mechanised formations were capable of conducting operational exploitations of up to 500 kilometers.

== Cold War ==
The special-purpose brigades of the Supreme Command Reserve became the first missile units, in accordance with the Resolution of the Council of Ministers of the USSR, dated May 13, 1946:

- 22nd Special Purpose Brigade of the Supreme Command (in August 1946, formed on the basis of the 92nd Guards Gomel Red Banner Order of Lenin, Suvorov, Kutuzov and Bogdan Khmelnitsky Mortar Regiment)
- 23rd Special Purpose Brigade of the Supreme Command (in December 1950, formation began on the basis of the 4th Fire Battery of the 22nd Special Forces Brigade)
- 54th Special Purpose Brigade of the Supreme Command (in 1952, in accordance with the directive of the General Staff, dated December 14, 1951)
- 56th Special Purpose Brigade of the Artillery Reserve of the Supreme High Command (in 1952, in accordance with the directive of the General Staff, dated December 14, 1951)

The first missile unit armed with long-range ballistic missiles was the 72nd Special Purpose Engineer Brigade of the Reserve of the General Command (commander - Major General of Artillery Aleksandr Tveretsky), created on August 15, 1946 as part of the Group of Soviet Occupation Forces in Germany; withdrawn a year later to the Kapustin Yar training-ground in Astrkahan Oblast. Then the brigade was redeployed to the village of Medved near Veliky Novgorod and, finally, to Gvardeysk in the Kaliningrad Oblast. In December 1950, the second special-purpose brigade of the Artillery Reserve of the Supreme High Command was formed.

Resolution of the Council of Ministers of the Soviet Union No. 3540-1647 "On special formations and special construction in the Military Armed Forces of the USSR" was issued on September 19, 1951, for the improvement of the special-purpose brigades of the Artillery Reserve of the Supreme High Command as part of the Soviet Armed Forces. The BrOsNaz (Russian: БрОсНаз - бригады особого назначения - Special Purpose Brigades) played a major role in developing the organizational and staff structure of the missile forces, methods of combat use of the main weapons, and training combat crews to launch ballistic missiles. In 1951-1955, five further such brigades were created, which in 1953 received a new name - engineering brigades of the Artillery Reserve of the Supreme High Command, in accordance with the directive of the General Staff, dated February 26, 1953. Until 1955 they were armed with R-1 and R-2 ballistic missiles with a range of 270 kilometers and 600 km, equipped with warheads with conventional explosives (general designer Sergei Korolev). These brigades were part of the Artillery Reserve of the Supreme High Command and reported to the commander of the artillery of the Soviet Army of the Soviet Armed Forces. They were led by a special department of the artillery headquarters of the Soviet Army of the USSR Armed Forces. In March 1955, the position of Deputy Minister of Defense of the USSR for special weapons and rocket technology was introduced (Marshal of Artillery Mitrofan Nedelin), under which a headquarters of rocket units was created. The combat use of engineering brigades was determined by the order of the Supreme High Command, the decision of which provided for the assignment of these units to the fronts. The front commander exercised control over the engineering brigades through the artillery commander.

== Russia after 1991 ==
In twenty-first century Russia, the only reserve of the Supreme Commander-in-Chief is the Russian Airborne Forces. Most of the Airborne Troops that are part of the Reserve of the Supreme Commander-in-Chief are also Guards. In relation to the Russian Airborne Troops, as the reserve of the Supreme Commander-in-Chief, two largely equivalent terms are officially used: reserve and means - the latter reflects the instrumental status of the troops among a set of other military and non-military measures for the implementation of state power, at the disposal of the country's top leader. According to the Commander of the Airborne Forces, Colonel General Vladimir Shamanov specific status is that the Airborne Forces, being the reserve of the Supreme Commander-in-Chief, are always ready to carry out any order of the President of Russia and the Minister of Defense of the Russian Federation, — at the same time, as the Commander specifically noted, in light of the reforms and structural changes in the military department (during the transition from military districts to the system of operational-strategic commands), the status of the Airborne Forces and their role remain unchanged, their independence as a separate branch of the Russian Armed Forces is preserved. According to the Commander of the Airborne Forces "We remain the operational-strategic reserve of the Minister of Defense and the Supreme Commander-in-Chief of the Russian Armed Forces". Being the reserve of the Supreme Commander-in-Chief, the troops will be intended to conduct independent actions in selected areas, as well as to strengthen the ground group, based on the decisions made by the General Staff.

The Airborne Forces have always been the Supreme Commander-in-Chief's reserve. The primary factor that makes the Airborne Forces the Supreme Commander-in-Chief's reserve is their mobility. This mobility ensures the defense of such a large territory as Russia has only by using airmobile units that can be airdropped into any theater of military operations at any time. The Airborne Forces, which de facto perform the function of rapid reaction forces, are considered best suited to this task.

The term elite troops is often used in relation to the Russian Airborne Forces, but this term is journalistic, while the official term that enshrines the special status of a particular branch of the military is the very fact of belonging to the Supreme Commander-in-Chief's reserve. According Chairman of the Federation Council, Sergey Mironov, "The Airborne Forces are a special branch of the military, which is held in special regard by the Ministry of Defense and the country's leadership. The Airborne Forces have always been and must remain the reserve of the Supreme Commander-in-Chief".

== See also ==
- Reserve Front
