= 60th Army =

- 60-я армия
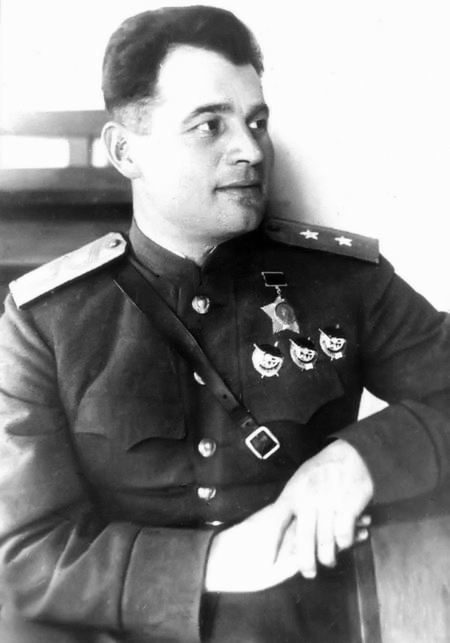
- General of the Army Ivan Chernyakhovsky
- Active: October–December 1941; 10 July 1942 – August 1945
- Country: Soviet Union
- Branch: Red Army
- Type: Infantry
- Size: Field army
- Part of: Moscow Military District; Voronezh Front; Kursk Front; Central Front; 1st Ukrainian Front (October 1943 - May 1945); 4th Ukrainian Front (May 1945 - August 1945)
- Engagements: Battle of Voronezh (1942); Voronezh-Kastornoye offensive Battle of Kursk; Lower Dnieper Offensive; Battle of Kiev (1943); Lvov-Sandomierz Offensive; Vistula-Oder Operation; Moravian-Ostrava Offensive; Prague Offensive

Commanders
- Notable commanders: Ivan Chernyakhovsky; Maksim Antoniuk

The Red Army's 60th Army (Russian: 60-я армия) was a Soviet field army during the Second World War. It was first formed in reserve in the Moscow Military District in October 1941, but soon was disbanded. It was formed a second time in July 1942, and continued in service until postwar. The 60th Army was commanded by Gen. Ivan Danilovich Chernyakhovsky for much of the war, and it was while in this command that he proved himself worthy to be promoted to the rank of General of the Army and command of a Front at the age of 38 years. Elements of the army went on to, among other things, liberate the Auschwitz concentration camp.

== First Formation ==
The 60th Army was first formed in October 1941, as a reserve formation of the Moscow Military District. It comprised the 334th, 336th, 348th, 358th, and 360th Rifle Divisions and the 11th Cavalry Division. All these divisions had been formed in the Volga Military District in the preceding months. The army was under the command of Lt. Gen. M.A. Purkayev. In December the rifle divisions were reassigned as follows: 334th, 358th and 360th to the 4th Shock Army, 336th to 5th Army, and 348th to 30th Army, while the 11th Cavalry joined the 7th Cavalry Corps in January. Purkayev's headquarters group had already been used to create the command cadre for the new 3rd Shock Army, and 60th Army was disbanded on Dec. 25.

== Second Formation ==
In April and May 1942, STAVKA began forming a total of ten new combined-arms reserve armies in preparation for the expected German summer offensive. STAVKA expected this to be directed at Moscow, while the German plans were, in fact, for a drive to the southeast. On July 2, after disastrous losses further west, 3rd Reserve Army was released to take up positions north of Voronezh. The army was under command of Lt. Gen. M.A. Antoniuk. As late as July 5, the Soviet command believed the new German offensive was a prelude to an advance on Moscow, but shortly thereafter they understood the true intent. The 3rd Reserve Army was directed to deploy to Voronezh Front, in the immediate environs of that eponymous city, and was renamed 60th Army on July 10. At that time its order of battle was as follows:

- 107th Rifle Division
- 121st Rifle Division
- 161st Rifle Division
- 195th Rifle Division
- 232nd Rifle Division
- 237th Rifle Division
- 303rd Rifle Division

On July 25, Maj. Gen. I. D. Chernyakhovsky was appointed to the command of the army, a command he would hold until mid-April 1944.

During the summer and autumn the 60th Army was engaged in an active defense of Voronezh and its approaches. German 4th Panzer Army arrived at the outskirts of the city on July 7 and began fighting to clear it of its 40th Army defenders. Counterattacks by 60th Army tied down these German mobile forces, leading to street fighting similar to what was to be seen in Stalingrad a few months later. The panzers were relieved by the infantry of 6th Army, and fighting continued until July 24 when the final Soviet defenders were cleared from the west bank sector of the city. The army continued to probe the German front in the weeks following in an attempt to deflect enemy forces from the fighting in Stalingrad; this cost significant losses in men and equipment and several of the divisions had to be taken out of the line for rebuilding.

In the wake of Operation Uranus and Operation Little Saturn, the remaining Soviet forces on the southern half of the front joined in the winter counteroffensive. On January 24, 1943, forces of Voronezh and Bryansk Fronts, including 60th Army, began the Voronezh-Kastornoye offensive against German 2nd Army, which was by now in a deep salient. Flanking and frontal attacks soon drove the remnants of that army westward in disorder towards Kursk and Belgorod. The former city became the new objective, and it fell to the 60th on Feb. 8. Gen. Kuznetsov of Front headquarters reported:

"The city of Kursk was taken by our forces at 1500 hours on 8 February 1943. The 60th Army. The forces of the army fought intensely for possession of Kursk... The enemy offered stubborn resistance with the remnants of 82nd Infantry Division, the 340th Infantry Division, and the 4th Panzer Division, which approached from the Orel region, while counterattacking our units from the vicinity of Kursk with a force of up to a regiment of infantry."

Following this the army staged another offensive aimed at L'gov and Ryl'sk from Feb. 12 - 20, exploiting the gap that had opened between German 2nd and 2nd Panzer Armies. Chernyakhovsky's attempt to take L'gov off the march was frustrated on Feb. 20; he then set out to envelop the town and eventually succeeded. On March 19, 60th and 38th Armies formed the short-lived Kursk Front. Five days later this was renamed Oryol Front, and the 60th was reassigned to Gen. K.K. Rokossovsky's Central Front. As the Germans regained their balance and the offensives ground to a halt, 60th Army found itself in the deepest, westernmost sector of the Kursk Salient, where it would remain through the following months.

== Battle of Kursk ==
On July 5, 1943, the order of battle of the army was as follows:

24th Rifle Corps, with:

- 112th Rifle Division
- 42nd Rifle Brigade
- 129th Rifle Brigade

30th Rifle Corps, with:

- 121st Rifle Division
- 141st Rifle Division
- 322nd Rifle Division

Separate Division:

- 55th Rifle Division

Other units:

- 248th Rifle Brigade
- 150th Tank Brigade
- 58th Armored Train Battalion
- 1156th Cannon Regiment
- 1178th Antitank Regiment
- 128th, 138th and 497th Mortar Regiments
- 98th Guards Mortar Regiment
- 286th Separate Guards Mortar Battalion
- 221st Guards, 217th Antiaircraft Regiments
- 59th Engineer-Sapper Brigade
- 317th Separate Engineer Battalion

The sector of the salient occupied by the 60th was considerably west of where German 9th Army attempted to penetrate Central Front's lines, and the army saw little combat during the German offensive. It also remained largely inactive when the Front went over to the counteroffensive towards Oryol. In August the army was reinforced by the 1st Guards Artillery Division. This unit would remain with 60th Army until after the transfer to 1st Ukrainian Front in October.

Finally on August 26 Central Front renewed its offensive against Army Group Center. 65th Army, along with the weakened 2nd Tank Army, struck 2nd Army's center at Sevsk, which was liberated on that first day. 48th Army flanked this drive on the right, while 60th operated on the left. The Germans counterattacked northwest of Sevsk on August 29, halting the main drive, but the 60th was able to break through on its sector, which the Germans had weakened in favor of Sevsk. By the end of the day Cherniakhovsky's forces had liberated Glukhov, and he continued to exploit using forward detachments. Rokossovsky changed his original plan and regrouped his 13th and 2nd Tank Armies to his left flank to exploit the gap. The Germans lost track of these mobile forces until Rokossovsky threw them against 2nd Army's flank and smashed it in. 60th Army liberated Konotop on September 6, Bakhmach on the 9th, and Nezhin on the 15th. By September 22, 13th, 60th and 61st Armies, with armored support, were closing on the Dniepr River north of Kiev.

== Battle of the Dniepr ==
At this point Central Front had advanced 100-120km farther than Voronezh Front, and in spite of having very extended flanks, appeared to have a real chance to liberate the Ukrainian capital from the march. Rokossovsky wrote:

"I visited Cherniakhovsky after his troops had liberated Nezhin. The soldiers and officers were filled with unprecedented enthusiasm. They had forgotten their fatigue and were plunging forward. Everyone had the same dream -- to take part in the liberation of the Ukraine's capital. Of course, Cherniakhovsky also felt the same way. All his actions were filled with the desire to reach Kiev more quickly."

Political calculations deemed otherwise. Stalin was keen to have the Ukrainian capital liberated by Ukrainians; Gen. N.F. Vatutin and his Military Council member N.S. Khrushchev of Voronezh Front (soon to be renamed 1st Ukrainian Front) fit the bill. The boundary lines between the two Fronts were altered and Central Front (soon to be Belorussian, then 1st Belorussian Front) was directed at Chernigov.

By the end of September, the 60th had a bridgehead over the Dniepr north of Kiev with a depth of 12-15km and a width of 20km. Rokossovsky ordered an attack to the west and southwest, past Kiev. Instead, Cherniakhovsky pushed southwards along the river; Kiev seemed to be "attracting the army commander just like a magnet." As this was the most heavily defended sector, the attack failed. On October 5, in a major reshuffle of the Fronts, 60th Army was moved to the (soon to be) 1st Ukrainian Front, where it continued to serve until the last weeks of the war.

== Clearing Western Ukraine ==
Kiev was finally liberated on Nov. 6. Over the following weeks see-saw battles took place west of the city, but by Dec. 26 the army had joined a new offensive against 4th Panzer Army towards Zhitomir. Between Jan. 27 and Feb. 11, 1944, the 13th and 60th Armies joined with the 1st Guards Cavalry Corps and 6th Guards Cavalry Corps to drive through the overextended German flank on the southern fringe of the Pripiat Marshes, unhinging their defenses, liberating Rovno and Lutsk, and taking favorable positions to continue operations into Army Group South's rear.

On March 5, Cherniakhovsky was promoted to the rank of Colonel General, and on Apr. 15 he took command of 3rd Belorussian Front, at the age of 38 the youngest man to reach that level of command. He remained in this command until he was mortally wounded in action in East Prussia on Feb. 18, 1945. Col. Gen. P.A. Kurochkin took over command of the army and held it for the duration. At about this time the 1827th SU Regiment (ISU-152s) was assigned as a support unit to the army, where it remained (redesignated as 368th Guards SU Reg't. in July) until April 1945.

On the sector of 60th Army, directly east of Lvov, the Lvov-Sandomierz Offensive began on July 14, with it and 38th Army hitting the left flank of 1st Panzer Army. That army had two panzer divisions in reserve close to the front; their counterattack the next day stopped the 38th and even won back some ground, but the 60th opened a breach in the line farther north. The next day, Marshal Konev ordered the 3rd Guards Tank Army into this gap. The Germans tried to pull their flanks back to a switch position called the Prinz Eugen line, but the Soviet forces continued to make penetrations. On the 18th their armored spearheads met on the Bug River 50km west of Lvov and the German XIII Army Corps (five German divisions and the SS Division Galicia) was encircled. By July 22 the gap in the German front was 50km wide and Soviet forward detachments were racing for the San and Vistula Rivers. On that same day XIII Corps attempted to break out, but of its 30,000 men only about 5,000 escaped. During the following months the 60th Army took up positions on the southern flank in the Sandomierz bridgehead and rebuilt in anticipation of the coming winter offensive.

== Into Germany ==
At the end of December 1944, the order of battle of 60th Army was as follows:

15th Rifle Corps, with:

- 9th Rifle Division
- 107th Rifle Division
- 336th Rifle Division

28th Rifle Corps, with:

- 246th Rifle Division
- 302nd Rifle Division
- 322nd Rifle Division

106th Rifle Corps, with:

- 100th Rifle Division
- 148th Rifle Division
- 304th Rifle Division

The 1st Ukrainian Front kicked off the Vistula-Oder Operation on Jan. 12, 1945, eight days earlier than originally planned, due to a request for assistance from the western Allies during the later stages of the Battle of the Bulge. 60th Army was tasked to provide protection on the south side of the main penetration force. By 1400 hours the two tank armies of the Front passed through the attacking infantry; by the end of the day the German defenses had been breached on a 35km frontage to a depth of 20km. Twenty-four hours later the penetration was 60km wide and 40km deep, and by Jan. 18 the Front was five days ahead of schedule.

On January 27, 1945, as the 60th continued on its flanking mission, the 322nd Rifle Division liberated the survivors of the Auschwitz concentration camp.

In the last weeks of the war, 60th Army was transferred to 4th Ukrainian Front, and ended the war near Prague. On 30 July 1945 the army's headquarters became the staff of the Kuban Military District at Krasnodar. On 4 February 1946 the district became the Kuban Territorial Military District, and became part of the North Caucasus Military District. The Kuban Territorial Military District was disbanded on 6 May.

== Commanders ==
- Lieutenant-General Maksim Purkayev (November - December 1941)
- Lieutenant-General Maksim Antoniuk (July 1942);
- Lieutenant-General, later Colonel-General Ivan Chernyakhovsky (July 1942 - April 1944);
- Colonel-General Pavel Kurochkin (April 1944 - until the end of the war).
