= Markian Popov =

Soviet general (1902–1969)

Маркиан Михайлович Попов Markian Mikhailovich Popov
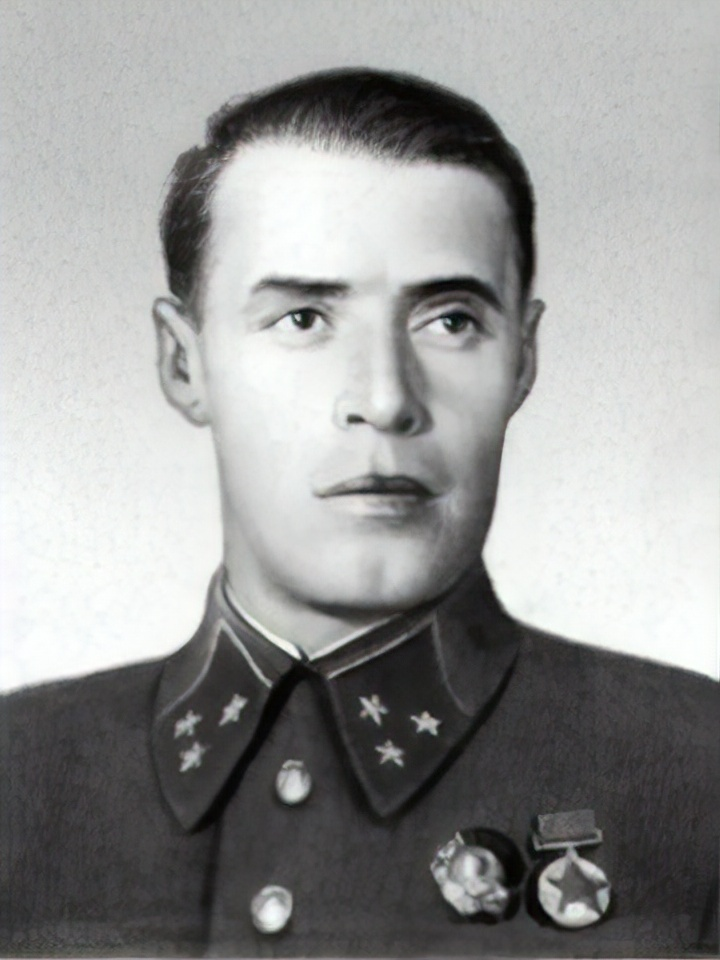
- M. M. Popov as Lieutenant General
- Born: 15 November 1902; Ust-Medvediskaya, Don Host Oblast, Russian Empire
- Died: 22 April 1969 (aged 66); Moscow, Russian SFSR, Soviet Union
- Burial place: Novodevichy Cemetery
- Military career
- Allegiance: Russian SFSR (1920–1922); Soviet Union (1922–1969)
- Branch: Red Army
- Service years: 1920–1969
- Rank: Army General
- Commands: Northern Front; Leningrad Front; 61st Army; 40th Army; 5th Shock Army; 5th Tank Army; Bryansk Front; 2nd Baltic Front
- Conflicts: Russian Civil War; World War II
- Awards: Hero of the Soviet Union; Order of Lenin (5); Order of the Red Banner (3); Order of the Red Star; Order of Suvorov (2); Order of Kutuzov (2)
- Other work: Communist Party of the Soviet Union (1921–1969)

Markian Mikhaylovich Popov (Russian: Маркиа́н Миха́йлович Попо́в; 15 November 1902 – 22 April 1969) was a Soviet military commander, Army General (26 August 1943), and Hero of the Soviet Union (1965).

== Early life ==
Markian Popov was born in 1902 in Ust-Medvediskaya in the Don Host Oblast (now Volgograd Oblast), in a family of Russian ethnicity. His father was a civil servant. Popov joined the Red Army in 1920 and the Bolshevik Party in 1921.

== World War II ==
During the German–Soviet War at various times he commanded a number of Armies and a number of Fronts. His career was uneven. In June 1941 he was Commander of the Leningrad Military District, then Northern Front (24 June – 5 September). The Germans advanced with a terrific speed, but then they were halted just before Leningrad. The army group was on 26 August renamed as the Leningrad Front. Then he participated in Zhukov's counteroffensive before Moscow. Zhukov, who co-ordinated several fronts in this Moscow sector, tried to collect able commanders in the area. So for example the 16th Army (Western Front) was headed by General Rokossovsky, the 4th Shock Army’s commander was General Yeryomenko, the 5th Army was under General Govorov. On December 18 Popov was appointed Commander of the 61st Army (Bryansk Front) and fought well during the counteroffensive.

He maintained this position until 28 June 1942. Then he was shifted to the Stalingrad area. He was Assistant Commander of the Stalingrad Front (under Yeremenko, 13 October – 20 November), then Commander of the 5th Shock Army (8 December – 28 December). On December 26 this army was switched to Vatutin's Southwestern Front. In 1943 firstly he commanded a larger mechanized group, but in February his unit was badly defeated.

Then he was appointed Commander of the Bryansk Front (5 June – 10 October 1943), with which he participated in the Battle of Kursk. During the battle, the Bryansk Front was very successful in pushing back the German opposition, and was able to capture Oryol and Bryansk in August. He was promoted to Army General (26 August 1943). After the Battle of Kursk he was sent north, to command the 2nd Baltic Front (20 October 1943 – 23 April 1944). He was demoted to Colonel General (20 April 1944) because of the unsuccessful actions in the Baltic area, but the real reason seems to be his criticism of Nikolai Bulganin, who was Commissar at the front. Until the end of the war he was Chief of Staff of the Leningrad Front.

== After the War ==
After the war, he commanded the Soviet troops in the Lviv Military District until 1946, then the Taurida Military District until 1954. After Stalin's death, he regained his old rank as Army general on 3 August 1953. In 1956–62 he was Chief of the General Staff of the Soviet Ground Forces. On 7 May 1965, he was subsequently honored with the title Hero of the Soviet Union for his services during World War II.

He died on 22 April 1969 from an accidental fire at home and was buried in Moscow's Novodevichy Cemetery.

He was never given the rank Marshal of the Soviet Union, although Marshal of Aviation Golovanov and Marshal Vasilevsky considered him very talented.

== Awards and decorations ==
Soviet Union

Hero of the Soviet Union (7 May 1965)
Order of Lenin, five times (22 February 1941, 30 April 1945, 14 November 1952, 16 November 1962, 7 May 1965)
Order of the Red Banner, three times (5 October 1944, 3 November 1944, 2 September 1950)
Order of Suvorov, 1st class, twice (28 January 1943, 27 August 1943)
Order of Kutuzov, 1st class, twice (22 June 1944, 29 June 1945)
Order of the Red Star (22 February 1968)
Medal "For the Defence of Stalingrad" (22 December 1942)
Medal "For the Defence of Moscow" (1 May 1944)
Medal "For the Defence of Leningrad" (22 December 1942)
Medal "For the Defence of the Soviet Transarctic" (5 December 1944)
Medal "For the Capture of Königsberg" (9 June 1945)
Medal "For the Victory over Germany in the Great Patriotic War 1941–1945" (9 May 1945)
Jubilee Medal "Twenty Years of Victory in the Great Patriotic War 1941-1945" (7 May 1965)
Jubilee Medal "XX Years of the Workers' and Peasants' Red Army" (22 February 1938)
Jubilee Medal "30 Years of the Soviet Army and Navy" (22 February 1948)
Jubilee Medal "40 Years of the Armed Forces of the USSR" (18 December 1957)
Jubilee Medal "50 Years of the Armed Forces of the USSR" (22 December 1967)
Medal "In Commemoration of the 250th Anniversary of Leningrad" (16 May 1957)

Foreign

Medal of Sino-Soviet Friendship (China)
Military Order of the White Lion, Second Class (Czechoslovakia)
War Cross 1939–1945 (Czechoslovakia)
