= Don Front =

- Active: September 30, 1942 – February 15, 1943
- Country: Soviet Union
- Branch: Red Army
- Type: Army Group Command
- Size: Several Armies
- Engagements: World War II; Battle of Stalingrad; Operation Koltso

Commanders
- Notable commanders: Konstantin Rokossovsky

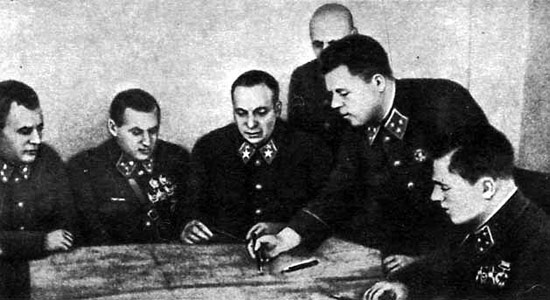

The Don Front was a front of the Soviet Red Army during the Second World War, which existed between September 1942 and February 1943, and was commanded during its entire existence by Konstantin Rokossovsky. The name refers to Don River, Russia.

== Formation ==
The front was created by order of the STAVKA of the Supreme High Command on Sept. 28, 1942 in order to form a more cohesive command structure to the much-reinforced Soviet forces fighting in and around Stalingrad. On that date the STAVKA ordered:

1. Organize two independent fronts in the Stalingrad region... the Don Front, including in it 63rd, 21st, 4th Tank, 1st Guards, 24th, and 66th Armies ...
3. Appoint Lt. Gen. K. K. Rokossovsky as commander of the forces of the Don Front, freeing him from his duties as commander of the Bryansk Front.
4. Additionally, bring Corps Commissar A. S. Zheltov into the Don Front's Military Council ...
7. Appoint Mjr. Gen. K. A. Kovalenko as deputy commander of the Don Front ...
8. Appoint Mjr. Gen. M. S. Malinin as the chief of staff of the Don Front ...
9. Appoint Col. Boikov as the chief of the Operations Department of the Don Front ...

The initial composition of the Don Front was as follows:

- 1st Guards Army - Kirill Moskalenko,
- 21st Army - Nikolay Krylov,
- 24th Army - Dmitry Timofeyevich Kozlov,
- 63rd Army - Vasily Kuznetsov,
- 66th Army - Rodion Malinovsky,
- 4th Tank Army - Vasily Kryuchenkin,
- 16th Air Army - Sergei Rudenko.

The command cadre of the new front came almost entirely from Rokossovsky's Bryansk Front, leaders that he trusted and would follow him until he was ordered to take command of 2nd Belorussian Front in late 1944.

On the basis of the STAVKA directive of February 5, 1943, the Don Front was transformed into the Central Front on February 15, 1943.
