= Moscow Reserve Front =

Military unit

The Moscow Reserve Front was a front of the Red Army during the Second World War. It was formed on 9 October 1941 under Lieutenant General Vladimir Artemyev and three days later was subordinated to General Georgy Zhukov. It was established on the basis of the Moscow defensive line in the Volokolamsk, Mozhaisky Maloyaroslavets Kaluga and fortified areas.
