= Bryansk Front =

- Active: Aug. 14 – Nov. 10, 1941; Dec. 24, 1941 – Mar. 12, 1943; Mar. 28 – Oct. 10, 1943
- Country: Soviet Union
- Branch: Red Army
- Type: Army Group Command
- Size: Several Armies
- Engagements: World War II; Battle of Moscow; Operation Blau; Voronezh–Kastornoye operation; Battle of Kursk; Second Battle of Smolensk

Commanders
- Notable commanders: Andrey Yeryomenko; Yakov Cherevichenko; Filipp Golikov; Konstantin Rokossovsky; Max Reyter; Markian Popov

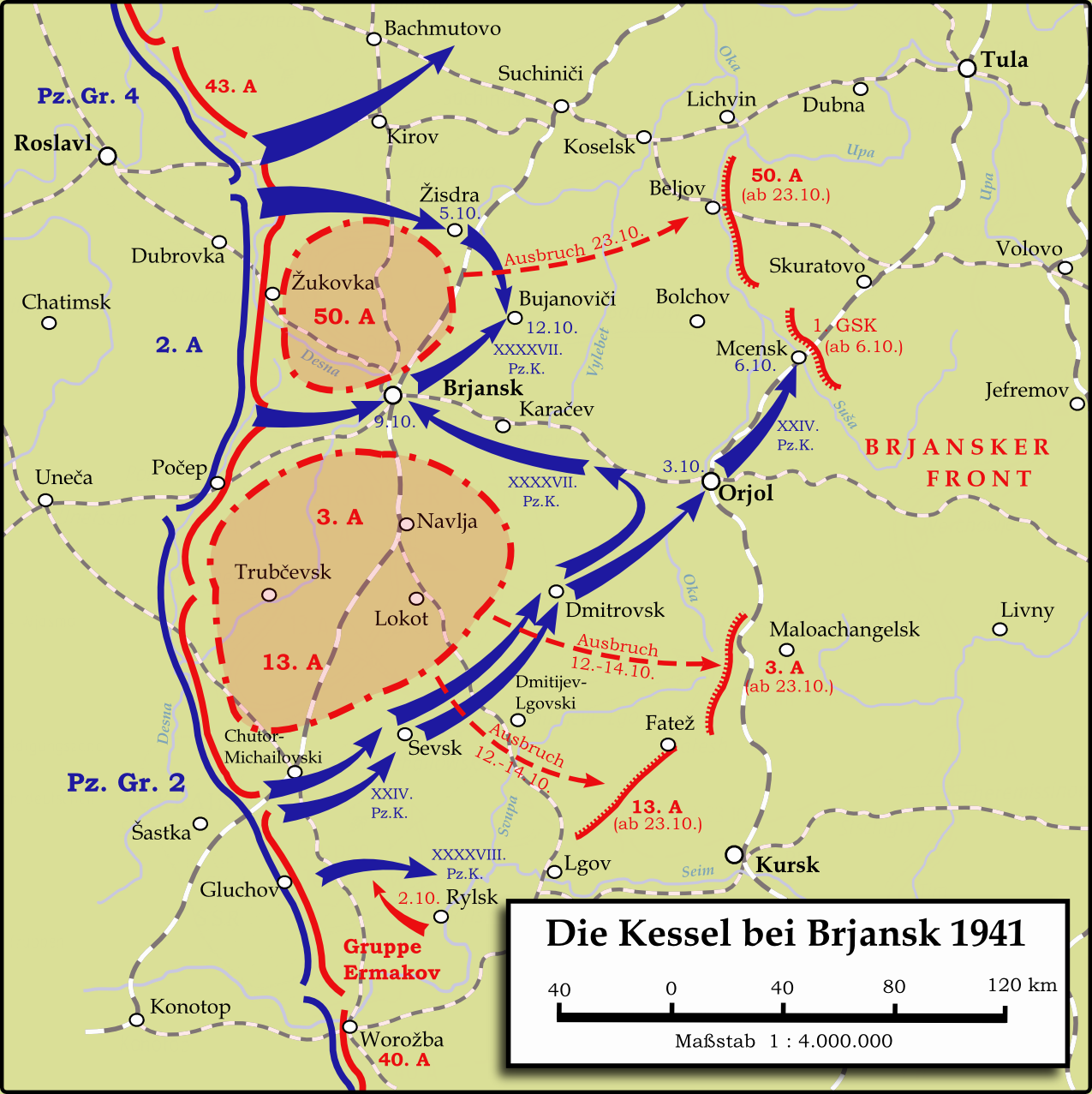
Battle of Bryansk

The Bryansk Front (Russian: Брянский фронт) was a major formation of the Red Army during the Second World War.

== First Formation (August - November 1941) ==
General Andrei Yeremenko was designated commander of the Front when it first formed in mid-late August 1941, comprising, in Erickson's words, "on paper two armies, 50th and 13th, with eight rifle divisions each, three cavalry divisions, and one tank division but many of these formations were badly whittled down by battle losses." Two other armies from Soviet Central Front, 21st and 3rd Army, which had avoided encirclement at the Battle of Smolensk (1941), were promised but also badly worn down.

In late August along with the Western Front (Soviet Union) and the Reserve Front, the Bryansk Front launched a large but unsuccessful counteroffensive in the Smolensk, El'nia, and Roslavl regions to halt Army Group Centre's advance on Moscow. Despite some success by the Reserve Front at El'nia, the efforts by Bryansk Front were a failure.

After the failure of the Smolensk offensives, the seriously weakened front became trapped in an enormous encirclement in the lead-up to the Battle of Moscow. "Most of the troops found themselves encircled, and were fighting their way to the east," according to Zhukov. On 23 Oct., "thanks to heroic efforts they managed to break out of encirclement." On 10 Nov., the Bryansk Front was "disbanded".

== Second Formation (December 1941 - March 1943) ==
On its second formation in late 1941 under Yakov Cherevichenko, part of the troops and forces of the Bryansk Front defending the Voronezh region, being designated as Voronezh Front on 7 July 1942. By the time of Operation Blau, the German summer offensive of 1942, the Front comprised the 3rd, 13th, 40th, 48th Armies, the 5th Tank Army, and the 2nd Air Army. It was then reformed, then disbanded on 11–12 March 1943 and its headquarters became HQ Kursk Front after a short time expecting to be the headquarters and the basis of the new Reserve Front.

== Third Formation (March 1943 - October 1943) ==
It was later reformed from the Orel Front on 28 March 1943.
By the time of the Battle of Kursk the Front consisted of

- 11th Army,
- 3rd Army,
- 4th Tank Army,
- 61st Army,
- 63rd Army.

Colonel General Markian Popov led it to liberate its namesake town Bryansk in August and September 1943. On 10 October 1943 the Stavka incorporated most of the Front's forces into the 1st Belorussian Front (former Central) and used Bryansk Front's HQ to form the HQ Baltic Front, which then became the 2nd Baltic Front.

== Commanders ==
First Formation

- Lieutenant-General Andrey Yeryomenko (16.08.41 to 13.10.41),
- Major-General Georgiy Fedorovich Zakharov (14.10.41 to 10.11.41).

Second Formation

- Colonel-General Yakov Cherevichenko (24.12.1941 to 02.04.1942),
- Lieutenant-General Filipp Golikov (02.04.1942 to 07.07.1942),
- Lieutenant-General Nikandr Yevlampyevich Chibisov (07.07.42 to 13.07.1942)
- Lieutenant-General Konstantin Rokossovsky (14.07.42 to 27.09.1942),
- Colonel-General Max Andreyevich Reyter (28.09.42 to 12.03.1943).

Third Formation

- Colonel-General Max Andreyevich Reyter (12.03.1943 to 05.06.1943),
- Colonel-General Markian Popov (05.06.43 to 10.10.1943).

== References and sources ==
- David Glantz, Colossus Reborn: The Red Army at War 1941–43, University Press of Kansas, 2005
