= Reserve Front =

Military formation of the WW2 Red Army

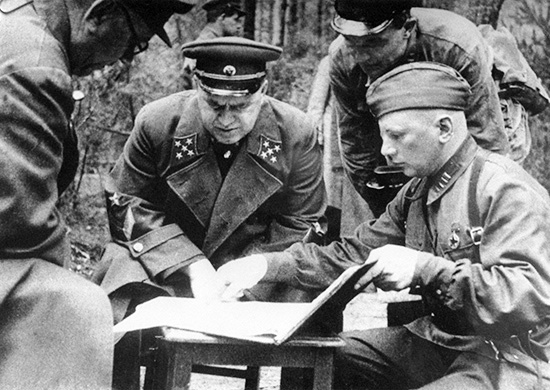
Army General Georgy Zhukov near Yelnya, 1941.

The Reserve Front (Russian: Резервный фронт, romanized: Rezervnyy front) was a major formation of the Red Army during the Second World War.

== First Formation ==
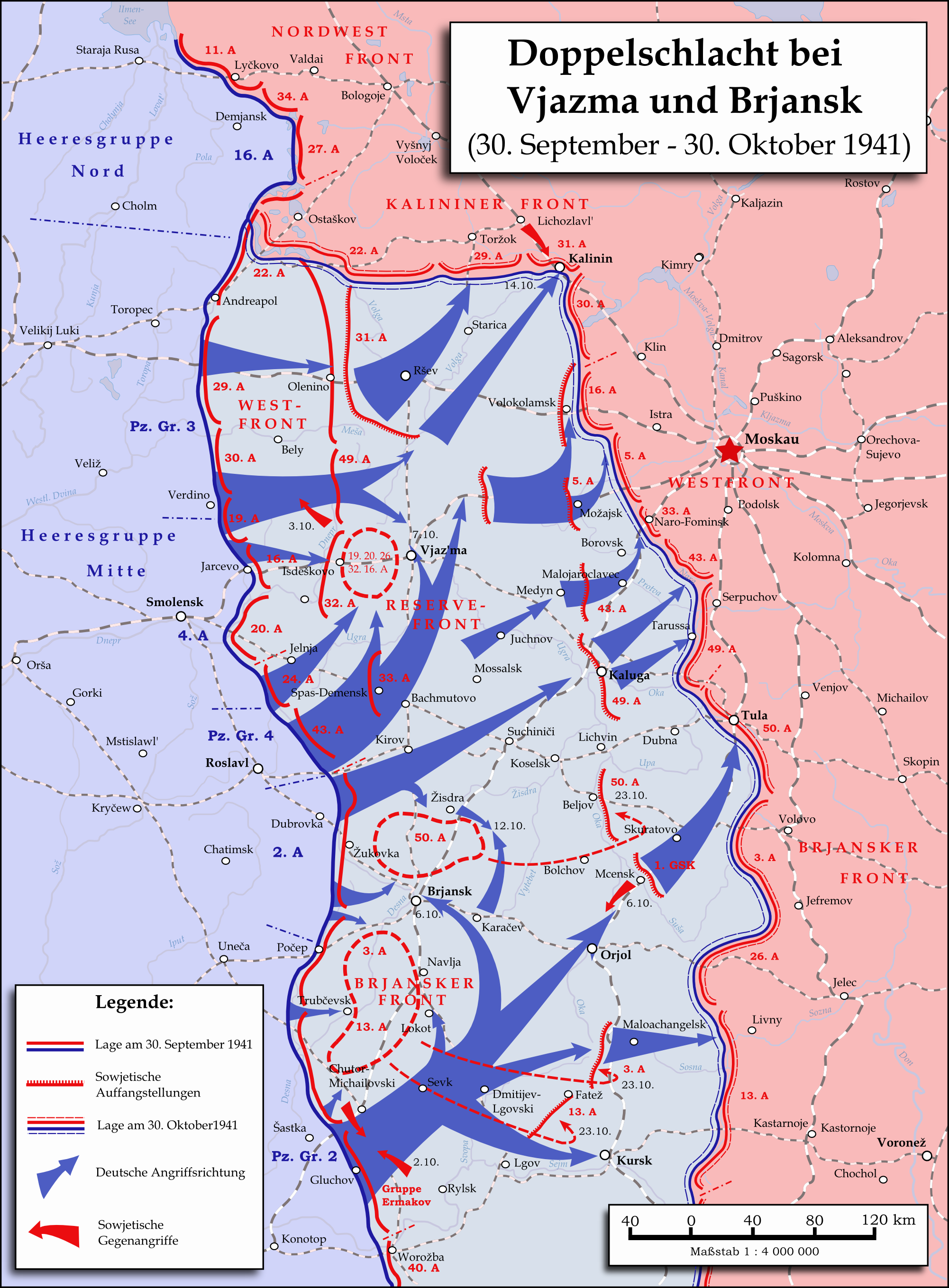
Battles of Vyazma and Briansk, 1941; the Reserve Front is in the centre at Vyazma.

The Reserve Front describes either of two distinct organizations during the war. The first version was created on July 30, 1941 in a reorganization of the earlier Front of Reserve Armies. STAVKA Order No.003334, of 14 July, directed that the Front of Reserve Armies include:

- 24th Army, with ten divisions, three gun, one howitzer, and three corps artillery regiments, and four anti-tank artillery regiments;
- 28th Army, with nine divisions, one gun, one howitzer, and four corps artillery regiments, and four anti-tank artillery regiments;
- 29th Army, with five divisions, five regiments of artillery, and two regiments and one squadron of aviation;
- 30th Army, with five divisions, one corps artillery regiment, and two AA artillery regiments;
- 31st Army, with six divisions, one corps artillery regiment, and two anti-tank artillery regiments; and
- 32nd Army, with seven divisions (apparently including the 8th Rifle Division), and one anti-tank artillery regiment.

This Front was encircled and destroyed at Vyazma during the Battle of Moscow.

The surviving forces transferred to the Western Front on October 10, 1941 under the command of Zhukov.

== 2nd Formation ==
The second version of this Front was created on April 6, 1943. It incorporated the:

- 2nd Reserve Army (3rd Formation)
- 24th Army
- 53rd Army
- 66th Army
- 47th Army
- 46th Army
- 5th Guards Tank Army
- eight mobile corps

It was reorganized as the Steppe Military District on April 15, 1943 and eventually designated the Steppe Front.

== Commanders ==
- Lieutenant General of NKVD Ivan A. Bogdanov [Front of Reserve Armies] (14–30 July, 1941)
- General Georgy K. Zhukov (August–September 1941)
- Marshal Semyon M. Budenny (September – 10 October, 1941)
- Lieutenant General Markian M. Popov (6–15 April, 1943)

== See also ==
- Reserve of the Supreme High Command
- Reserve duty (Israel)
