= Stavka =

High military command of the Russian Empire, Soviet Union and Ukraine

The Stavka (Russian and Ukrainian: Ставка, Belarusian: Стаўка) is a name of the high command of the armed forces used formerly in the Russian Empire and Soviet Union and currently in Ukraine.

In Imperial Russia Stavka referred to the administrative staff, and to the General Headquarters in the late 19th-century Imperial Russian armed forces and subsequently in the Soviet Union. In Western literature it is sometimes written in uppercase (STAVKA), although it is not an acronym. Stavka may refer to its members, as well as to the headquarters location (its original meaning from the old Russian word ставка, lit. 'tent').

== Stavka of the Supreme Commander during World War I ==
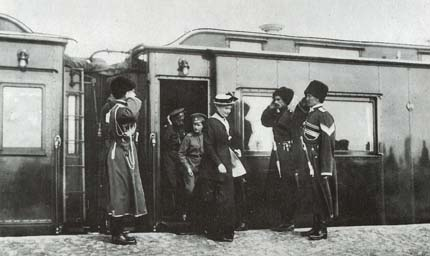
Alexandra Fyodorovna, Tsarevitch Alexei and Nicholas II arriving at the Stavka, May 1916.

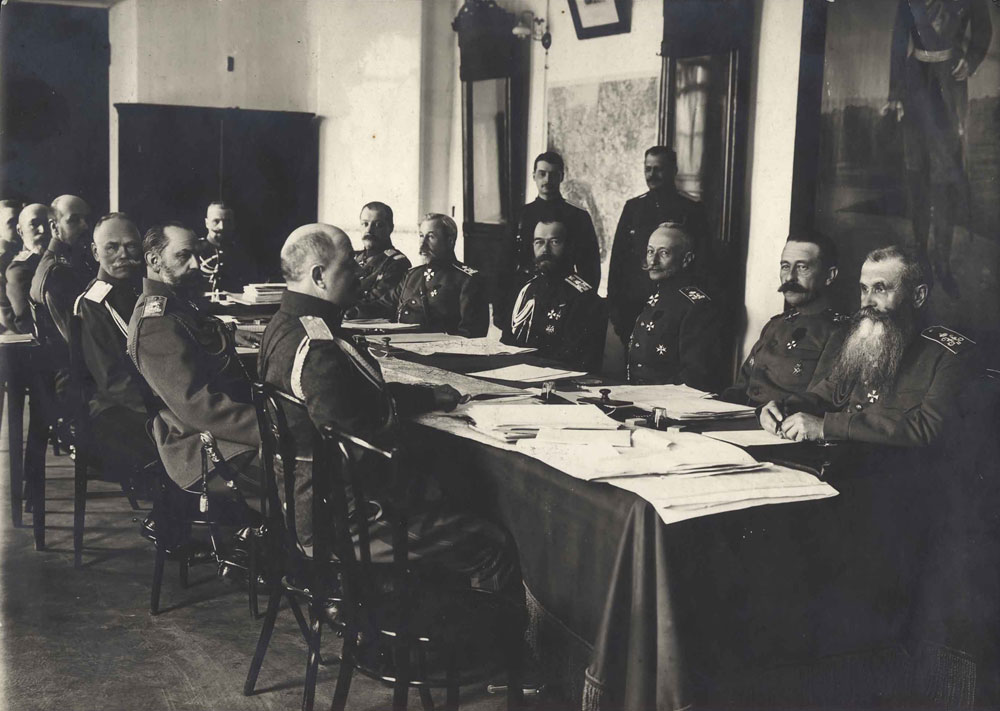
Nicholas II with members of the Stavka at Mogilev, 1 April 1916.

The commander-in-chief of the Russian army at the beginning of World War I was Grand Duke Nicholas Nicholaievitch, a grandson of Tsar Nicholas I. Appointed at the last minute in August 1914, he played no part in formulating the military plans in use at the beginning of the war. Nikolai Yanushkevich was his chief of staff. In the summer of 1915 the tsar himself took personal command, with Mikhail Alekseyev as his chief of staff. In the years 1915–1917 Stavka was based in Mogilev and the tsar, Nicholas II, spent long periods there as Commander-in-Chief.

The Stavka was divided into several departments:

- Department of General-Quartermaster (Operations department)
- Department of General on Duty (Organisation of troops, supplies, promotions, staff matters)
- Department of military transportations
- Naval department
- Diplomatic chancery (liaison with the Ministry of Foreign Affairs)

The Stavka was first established in Baranovichi. In August 1915, after the German advance, the Stavka re-located to Mogilev.

=== Chiefs of staff ===
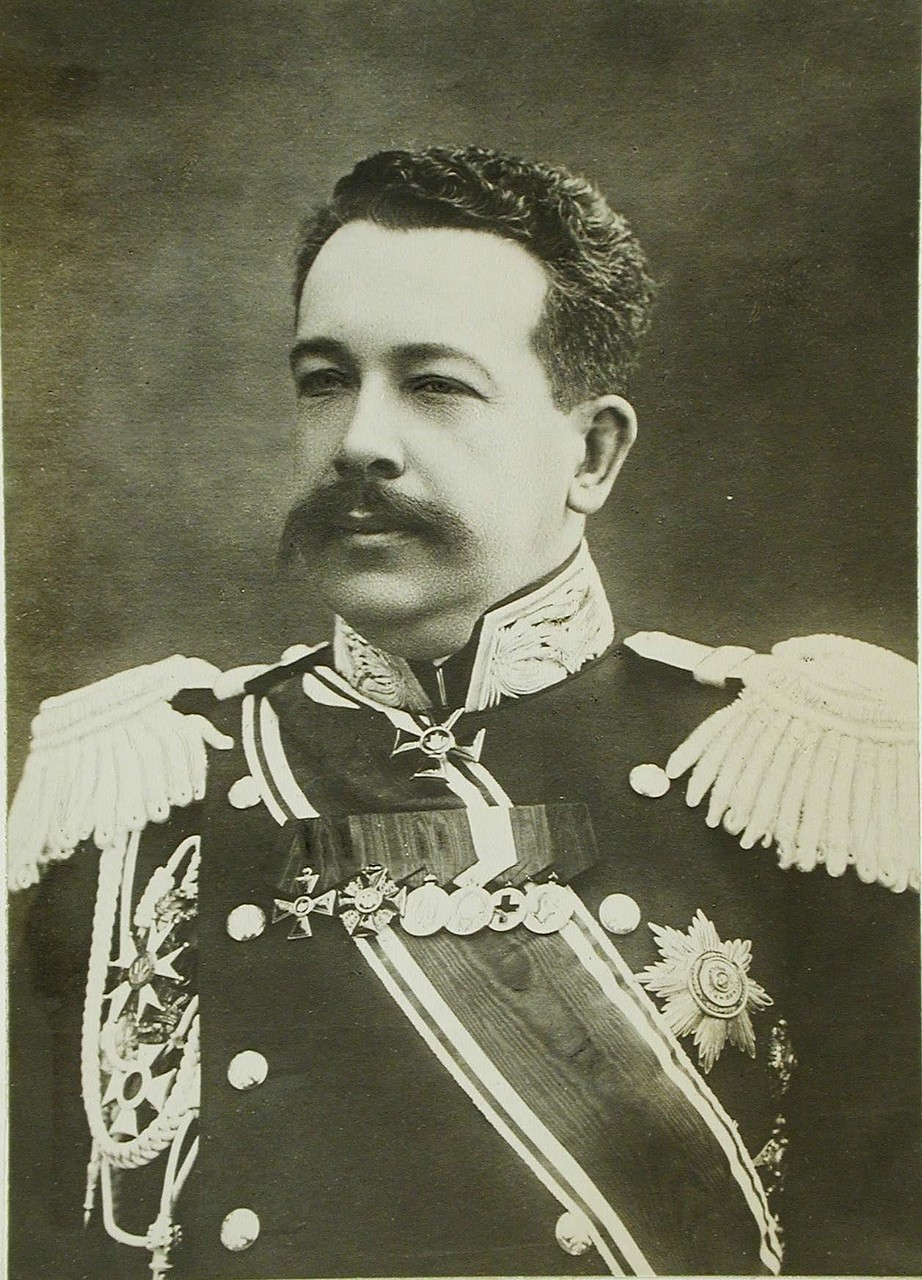
Nikolai Yanushkevich

- 19 July 1914 – 18 August 1915: Lieutenant-General (from 22 October 1914, General of Infantry) Nikolai Yanushkevich
- 18 September 1915 – 1 April 1917: General of Infantry (from 1916 adjutant General) Mikhail Alekseyev
- 10 November 1916 – 17 February 1917: General of Cavalry Vasily Gurko
- 11 March 1917 – 5 April 1917: General of Infantry Vladislav Klembovsky
- 5 April 1917 – 31 May 1917: Lieutenant-General Anton Denikin
- 2 June 1917 – 30 August 1917: Lieutenant-General Alexander Lukomsky
- 30 August 1917 – 9 September 1917: General of Infantry Mikhail Alekseyev
- 10 October 1917 – 3 November 1917: Lieutenant-General Nikolay Dukhonin
- 3 November 1917 – 7 November 1917: Major General Mikhail Dieterichs
- 7 November 1917 – February 1918: Major General Mikhail Bonch-Bruevich

== Stavka of the Red Army during World War II ==
The Stavka of the Soviet Armed Forces during World War II, or the headquarters of the "Main Command of the Armed Forces of the USSR" (Stavka Glavnogo Komandovaniya) (Russian: Ставка Главного Командования Вооруженных Сил Союза ССР), was established on 23 June 1941 by a top-secret decree signed by Joseph Stalin in his capacities both as the head of government and as the leader of the Communist Party of the Soviet Union. According to this decree, Stavka was composed of the defence minister Marshal Semyon Timoshenko (as its president), the head of General Staff Georgy Zhukov, Stalin, Vyacheslav Molotov, Marshal Kliment Voroshilov, Marshal Semyon Budyonny and the People's Commissar (Narkom) of the Navy Admiral Nikolai Gerasimovich Kuznetsov.

The same decree organized at Stavka "the institution of permanent counsellors of Stavka": Marshal Kulik, Marshal Shaposhnikov, Kirill Meretskov, head of the Air force Zhigarev, Nikolay Vatutin, head of Air Defence Voronov, Mikoyan, Kaganovich, Lavrenty Beria, Voznesensky, Zhdanov, Malenkov, Mekhlis.

Very soon afterwards, the deputy defence minister of the army, Kirill Meretskov, was arrested following false charges made by Beria and Merkulov. Meretskov was subsequently released from jail on the same day, at the end of the first week of September 1941, which was called for by Stalin.

Stavka's Main Command was reorganized into the Stavka of the Supreme Command (Stavka Verkhovnogo Komandovaniya) on 10 July 1941. This action occurred after Stalin was named Supreme Commander, and replaced Timoshenko as head of Stavka. On 8 August 1941 it was again reorganized into Stavka of the Supreme Main Command (Stavka Verkhovnogo Glavnokomandovaniya).

On the same day Strategic Directions commands were instituted.

A 17 February 1945 decree set out the membership of Stavka as Stalin (President), Zhukov, Aleksandr Vasilevsky, Aleksei Antonov, Nikolai Bulganin and Kuznetsov.

== Stavka of the Supreme Commander-in-Chief of the Armed Forces of Ukraine ==
The Stavka of the Supreme Commander-in-Chief (Ukrainian: Ставка Верховного Головнокомандувача) is the highest command and control body for the troops and individual branches of the Armed Forces of Ukraine, as well as law enforcement services and agencies of Ukraine, which are part of the Armed Forces, formed by decree of the President of Ukraine No. 72/2022 dated February 24, 2022 in response to the Russian full-scale invasion of Ukraine on that day.

== See also ==
- General Staff of the Armed Forces of the Russian Federation
- General Staff of the Ukrainian Armed Forces
