= Rostov Defensive Operation =

Rostov Front–Line Defensive Operation of 1941
- Part of Donbas–Rostov strategic defensive operation, the Great Patriotic War
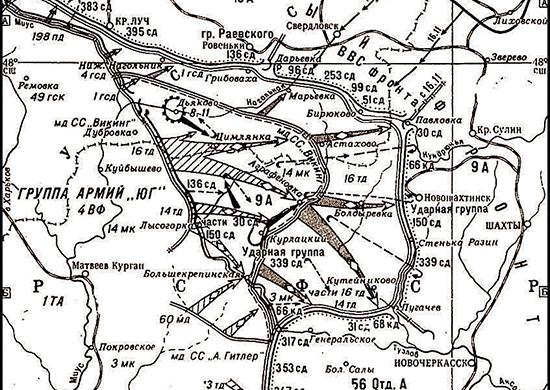
- Rostov Defensive Operation, November 5–16, 1941
| Date | November 5–16, 1941 |
| Location | Donbas |
| Result | Withdrawal of the Red Army, disruption of the German plan to capture Rostov-on-Don |

Belligerents
| Soviet Union | Germany; Italy |

Commanders and leaders
| (Soviet Union) Semyon Timoshenko (Soviet Union) Yakov Cherevichenko | (Nazi Germany) Gerd von Rundstedt (Nazi Germany) Ewald von Kleist |

The Rostov Defensive Operation on November 5–16, 1941 was a front–line defensive operation of the Soviet troops of the Southern Front, an integral part of the Donbas–Rostov Strategic Defensive Operation of the Great Patriotic War.

== Previous events and plans of the parties ==
Having suffered a heavy defeat in the Donbas Defensive Operation in October 1941, the troops of the Soviet Southern Front (commanded by Colonel General Yakov Cherevichenko) withdrew to the Debaltsevo–Bolshekrepinskaya–Khapry line by the beginning of November 1941. At this line, the heavily weakened armies of the front were hastily consolidated: the 12th Army (Major General Konstantin Koroteev), the 18th Army (Major General Vladimir Kolpakchi), the 9th Army (Major General Fyodor Kharitonov).

All armies had a large shortage of personnel, and especially in military equipment. After a heavy defeat in the Donbas operation, they demanded a significant replenishment, but all Soviet reserves were sent to Moscow and to form Reserve Armies.

Since Rostov-on-Don remained the main target of the German offensive, the 56th Separate Army (Lieutenant General Fyodor Remezov) was deployed on the approaches to the city, which hastily created the Rostov–Novocherkassk fortified region and was responsible for the immediate defense of Rostov.

The command of Army Group South (General Field Marshal Gerd von Rundstedt), after a short pause to pull up the rear, was preparing to resume the operation to capture Rostov. However, having received intelligence information about the strengthening of the Soviet defense on the shortest route to Rostov along the Taganrog–Rostov-on-Don railway along the Azov Sea coast, it decided to change the direction of the main attack and carry out a deep enveloping maneuver from the north and northeast, through Dyakovo, Shakhty, Novocherkassk. If successful, the troops of the 9th and 56th Separate Armies would fall into the encirclement northwest of Rostov. Then it was planned to turn part of the forces of the 1st Tank Army to the north and, together with the troops of the 17th Army, close a new encirclement ring in the Voroshilovgrad area for complete encirclement and elimination of the entire Southern Front in the eastern part of Donbas.

In addition, the 1st Panzer Army (Colonel General Ewald von Kleist) was to seize a bridgehead on the southern bank of the Don. After that, it was supposed to develop an offensive to the south and, first of all, to capture Maykop and Tuapse in order to send oil through the pipeline and further by sea for refining to Romania. In March – April 1942, German troops expected to completely occupy the Caucasus up to the border with Iran.

To carry out the operation, the 14th Motorized Corps (General of the Infantry Gustav von Wietersheim of the 1st Panzer Army (14th and 16th Panzer Divisions, SS Viking Motorized Division) was deployed to the eastern part of Donbas. From the south, he was assisted by the 3rd Motorized Corps (60th Motorized Division and SS Adolf Hitler Motorized Division), from the north by the 49th Mountain Corps (1st and 4th Mountain Divisions). In the south, the 13th Panzer Division delivered a diversionary blow to Rostov along the shortest route. The offensive of the strike group was supported by the troops of the 17th German Army and the Italian Expeditionary Corps (General Giovanni Messe).

The Soviet command was able to timely reveal the transfer of the strike forces of the 1st Tank Army to the north, accurately determine the direction of the main attack (in the zone of the 9th Soviet Army) and unravel the German plans. Not having in their reserve tank forces to parry a German strike and not counting on replenishing their significantly weakened troops, the Commander–in–Chief of the South–West Direction, Marshal of the Soviet Union Semyon Timoshenko and Cherevichenko focused on exhausting the enemy with stubborn defense. In the defensive zone of the 9th Army, a system of anti–tank strong points and anti–tank areas was built in the Dyakovo area, which became one of the first experiments with a powerful anti-tank defense in the Great Patriotic War. These points mutually covered each other with fire, were echeloned in depth and provided crossfire from several artillery positions on each target. The infantry personnel allocated for the defense of these points were tested with tanks and were trained in actions when repelling tank attacks.

== Operation progress ==
On November 5, the German 1st Panzer Army launched an offensive in the 9th Army's defense zone. The German command did not succeed in achieving a surprise; the battle immediately took on an extremely fierce character. On the 9th Army's right flank, relying on the anti–tank areas at Dyakovo, two Soviet rifle divisions pinned down three 1st Panzer Army divisions and inflicted heavy losses on them. German tanks, with great difficulty, slowly moved forward, storming one Soviet position after another. Parts of the 9th Army of General Fyodor Kharitonov combined stubborn defense with active actions, inflicted three powerful counterattacks on the wedged enemy. By the end of November 8, in four days of fighting, the enemy, at the cost of heavy losses, had managed to push the 9th Army 30–35 kilometers away.

From November 11 to 16, German troops advanced another 25 kilometers in the Novocherkassk direction. The advance on the main direction to Shakhty was only 15 kilometers, on the auxiliary one (to Krasny Sulin) – a little more than 10 kilometers, and in a diversionary attack on Rostov, the German 13th Panzer Division did not advance at all. To the north, in the zone of the 18th Army, the advance of the German infantry divisions in 12 days of fighting ranged from 2 to 10 kilometers. During the entire battle, the enemy never managed to break through the Soviet defenses.

The penetration of German troops into the line of the Soviet defense forced them to stretch out their northern flank. A front line configuration favorable for the Soviet side was formed, convenient for striking the flank and rear of the 1st German Tank Army. On November 8, the Commander–in–Chief of the troops of the South–Western direction, Semyon Timoshenko, reported to the Supreme Commander–in–Chief Joseph Stalin the plan of an offensive operation with the aim of defeating the 1st German Tank Army. Already on November 9, the Headquarters of the Supreme Command decided to prepare and conduct this operation. In the area of Shakhty – Kamensk-Shakhtinsky, the striking force of the front – the 37th Army – was quickly formed and concentrated.

== Results of the operation ==
Both sides suffered significant losses in manpower, and the German side in tanks. As a result of losses, the command of Army Group South had to make adjustments to the plan for a further offensive, which again led to a regrouping of troops and a suspension of the offensive. The plan for a new encirclement of the troops of the Southern Front was thwarted by the Red Army at the very beginning.

Under cover of the stubborn heroic defense of the armies of the Southern Front, and above all the troops of the 9th Army, the Soviet command regrouped its forces. On November 15–16, troops of the 37th Army moved out of the concentration area to the front line and occupied the starting lines for the launch of a counteroffensive on the Rovenki–Pavlovka line.

Without the slightest operational pause, on November 17, Soviet troops went on the offensive – the Rostov Offensive Operation began. In the course of it, the course of the battle on the entire southern flank of the Soviet–German front was turned around and the largest defeat was inflicted on German troops in the entire history of World War II.

== Sources ==
- Vladimir Afanasenko, Evgeny Krinko (2013). 56th Army in the Battles for Rostov. The First Victory of the Red Army. October–December 1941. Forgotten Armies. Forgotten Army Commanders. Moscow: Centerpolygraph. ISBN 978-5-227-04655-0.
- History of World War II of 1939–1945 (In 12 Volumes) / Editorial Board, Editor–in–Chief Andrey Grechko. Volume 4 – Moscow, Military Publishing House of the Ministry of Defense of the Soviet Union, 1975 – Pages 116–119
- Alexey Isaev. From Dubno to Rostov – Moscow: Limited Liability Company "Publishing House AST": Publishing House Tranzitkniga, 2004 – Chapter 9
- Yuri Krasnykh, Ilya Moschanskiy. Battle of Rostov. Operations of the Southern and Southwestern Fronts on September 29 – December 2, 1941 // Military Chronicle. Photo–Illustrated Periodicals. Moscow, 2006. No. 1
- Red Banner North Caucasian. Rostov–on–Don, 1971 – Pages 166–172
- Radio Control – Tachanka / Edited by Nikolai Ogarkov – Moscow: Military Publishing House of the Ministry of Defense of the Soviet Union, 1980 – 693 Pages – (Soviet Military Encyclopedia: in 8 Volumes; 1976–1980, Volume 7) – Pages 147–148, With a Map
