= Donbas operation (1941) =

Donbas operation in 1941
- Part of the Donbas–Rostov strategic defensive operation in the Eastern Front (World War II)
Date	September 29 – November 4, 1941
Location	Donbas
Result	German victory

Belligerents
Soviet Union	Germany

Commanders and leaders
(Soviet Union) Semyon Timoshenko (Soviet Union) Dmitry Ryabyshev (Soviet Union) Yakov Cherevichenko	Gerd von Rundstedt; Ewald von Kleist; Erich von Manstein

Units involved
9th and 18th Armies of the Southern Front	Tank Group "Kleist"; 17th Army; Parts of the 11th Army

Casualties and losses
18th Army; Part of the 9th Army	Unknown

The Donbas Operation (September 29 – November 4, 1941) was a frontline defensive operation of the Soviet Red Army in the territory of Donbas on the Eastern Front of the Second World War in Europe. It was an integral part of the Donbas–Rostov Strategic Defensive Operation.

== Forces of the parties ==
By the end of September 1941, the German army’s approaches to Donbas were defended by:

- Southwestern Front (Marshal of the Soviet Union Semyon Timoshenko):
  - 6th Army. (Note: The Soviet 6th Army of the Southwestern Front was almost completely destroyed in the encirclement near Uman. Army commander Ivan Muzychenko was captured. On August 10, 1941, the army was disbanded.)
- Southern Front (Lieutenant General Dmitry Ryabyshev, from October 5, Colonel General Yakov Cherevichenko):
  - 12th Army (Soviet Union) (Major General Ivan Galanin);
  - 18th Army (Soviet Union) (Lieutenant General Andrey Smirnov);
  - 9th Army (Soviet Union) (Lieutenant General Fedor Kharitonov).

The advancing forces consisted of the troops of Army Group South:

- 17th Army (Stülpnagel);
- 1st Panzer Group (Kleist);
- Part of the 11th Army (Manstein);
- Main forces of the 3rd Romanian Army.

The superiority of German troops over the Soviets was: (Note: Most of the troops of the Southwestern Front died near Uman (August 1–8) and Kiev (September). The direction to Rostov was covered only by the 18th Army of the Southern Front, but it was also surrounded and killed near Chernigovka (Chernihivka, October 1–8, 1941).)

- In manpower and aviation – 2 times;
- In guns and mortars – 3 times.

== Operation ==
On September 29, German forces launched an offensive. The 1st Panzer Group (from October 6, the 1st Tank Army) and the motorized division of the 11th Army almost immediately broke through the defenses of the Soviet troops and entered the area of the city of Osipenko (now Berdyansk). With this maneuver, they surrounded parts of the 18th and 9th Armies. The encirclement continued until October 10.

The Soviet 12th Army took up defenses on the Pavlograd (Pavlohrad)–Vasilkovka (Vasylkivka)–Gavrilovka (Havrylivka) line to contain the enemy's advance and ensure the withdrawal of the remaining troops.

At the same time, the Soviet Taganrog Combat Area was created, consisting of 3 rifle divisions to organize defense on the eastern bank of the Mius River from Uspenskaya (Uspenka[?]) to Taganrog and to cover the approaches to Rostov-on-Don.

On October 14, the Soviet 9th Army and the Taganrog Combat Area (the troops of the Southern Front) launched a counterattack and pushed the enemy forward units by 10–15 kilometers. However, with the approach of the main forces of the 1st German Tank Army, Soviet troops were again forced to retreat. The right wing of the front, by order of the Headquarters of the Supreme High Command, retreated to the Krasny Liman (Lyman)–Debaltsevo (Debaltseve) line, and the left wing (18th and 9th Armies), under pressure from superior German forces, to the Debaltsevo–Krasnyi Luch–Bolshekrepinskaya–Khapry line, where they took up defensive positions.

== Outcome ==
German and Romanian forces defeated the remnants of the Southern Front of the Red Army, reached the Sea of Azov and entered the Crimea, and occupied the southwestern part of Donbas.

In early November, the 1st Panzer Group of the Wehrmacht resumed the offensive on Rostov-on-Don (Rostov Defensive Operation).

== Sources ==
- Донбасская операция 1941 года: 29 сентября–4 ноября 1941 г. [Donbas operation of 1941: 29 September–4 November 1941]. История второй мировой войны 1939–1945 [History of the Second World War 1939–1945] (in Russian). Vol. 4. Moscow: Military Publishing House of the Ministry of Defense of the Soviet Union. 1975.
