= Donbas–Rostov strategic defensive operation =

Red army operation of World War II

Donbas–Rostov Strategic Defensive Operation of 1941
- Part of Great Patriotic War
Date	September 29 – November 16, 1941
Location	Donbas
Result	Defeat of the Red Army; Disruption of the German plan to capture Rostov

Belligerents
Soviet Union	Germany; Romania; Italy; Hungary

Commanders and leaders
(Soviet Union) Semyon Timoshenko (Soviet Union) Dmitry Ryabyshev (Soviet Union) Yakov Cherevichenko	(Nazi Germany) Gerd von Rundstedt (Nazi Germany) Ewald von Kleist (Nazi Germany) Erich von Manstein

Strength
541,600	Unknown

Casualties and losses
143,313 (irrevocable); 17,263 (sanitary)	Per Germans: 3,454 killed 660 missing 13,113 wounded

The Donbas–Rostov Strategic Defensive Operation (September 29 – November 16, 1941) was a defensive operation of the Southern Front and the left wing of the South–Western Front of the Red Army on the territory of Donbas during the World War II. During it, the Donbas and Rostov front–line defensive operations were carried out.

== Forces of the parties ==
By the end of September 1941, the approaches to Donbas were defended by:

- Southern Front (Commander Lieutenant General Dmitry Ryabyshev, from October 5 – Colonel General Yakov Cherevichenko):
  - 12th Army (Soviet Union) (Commanded by Major General Ivan Galanin);
  - 18th Army (Soviet Union) (Commanded by Lieutenant General Andrei Smirnov, since October Major General Vladimir Kolpakchi);
  - 9th Army (Soviet Union) (Commanded by Lieutenant General Fyodor Kharitonov).
- Left Wing of the Southwestern Front (Marshal of the Soviet Union Semyon Timoshenko):
  - 6th Army (Commanded by Lieutenant General Rodion Malinovsky).
- Azov Military Flotilla (Commander 1st Rank Captain Alexander Alexandrov, from October 1941 – Rear Admiral Sergey Gorshkov).

The general leadership of the troops was carried out by the Commander–in–Chief of the troops of the South–West direction, Marshal of the Soviet Union Semyon Timoshenko. These troops included 23 rifle divisions, 5 cavalry divisions, 6 tank brigades, and 1 fortified area.

The opposing forces of the Wehrmacht – the troops of Army Group South (Commanded by General Field Marshal Gerd von Rundstedt):

- 17th Army (Commanded by Colonel General Carl von Stülpnagel);
- 1st Panzer Group, from October 6 – 1st Panzer Army (Commanded by Colonel General Ewald von Kleist);
- 11th Army (General of the Infantry Erich von Manstein);
- 3rd Romanian Army (Commander Petre Dumitrescu);
- Italian Expeditionary Corps in Russia (Commanded by General Giovanni Messe);
- Mobile Corps (Hungary) (Commanded by Major General Béla Miklós).

They consisted of 18 infantry divisions, 3 tank divisions, 10 different brigades. The Romanian, Italian and Hungarian troops were operatively subordinate to the commanders of those German armies in which they operated.

The superiority in favor of the German and allied troops was 2 times in people, 2 times in aviation, 3 times in artillery and mortars.

== Previous events and plans of the parties ==
By the end of September 1941, during the Tiraspol–Melitopol Defensive Operation, Soviet troops were thrown back with heavy losses to the Milk Estuary – Nikopol – Zaporozhye – Dnepropetrovsk – Krasnograd line, where they put themselves in order and built defensive lines. Their total number was 541,600 people. By the directive of the Headquarters of the Supreme High Command of September 22, 1941, they were ordered to create a stable defense and allocate reserves. But even in this situation, the Headquarters of the Supreme High Command demanded active offensive actions from the front. Fulfilling these requirements, virtually all the armies of the front carried out private offensive operations at the end of September, with very limited or no success, but with significant losses.

The German command planned to deliver the main deep dissecting blow with the forces of the 1st Tank Group from the area north of Dnepropetrovsk in the direction of the Azov Sea (to the city of Osipenko). An auxiliary blow was delivered by the 11th German (from the Nikopol Area) and the 3rd Romanian Army (along the coast of the Azov Sea). Having united, these groups were supposed to destroy the main forces of the Southern Front. The 17th Army provided the flank of the advancing strike group, with the task of defeating the 6th Soviet Army. After the destruction of the Southern Front, German troops were to develop an offensive against Voroshilovgrad (17th Army) and Rostov–on–Don (1st Panzer Group). In favor of the German troops were the general superiority in forces and equipment, as well as the skillful concentration of the most mobile and trained forces in the direction of the main attack (practically the entire 1st Tank Group – 350 tanks – went on the offensive on a front of only 25 kilometers). Soviet intelligence was unable to establish the concentration of the 1st Tank Group in this sector, so the blow of this entire armada fell on the positions of two rifle divisions, staffed after previous battles by less than 50% personnel and practically without artillery.

== Operation progress: first stage ==
On September 29, German troops launched an offensive. The main blow was struck at the junction between the Southwestern and Southern Fronts in the area of the city of Novomoskovsk. On the same day, the troops went on the offensive in auxiliary directions. Quickly breaking through the weak Soviet defenses, the German 1st Panzer Army rushed into the breakthrough. Having traveled over 200 kilometers in 9 days, on October 7, north of Osipenko, the 1st Panzer Army joined up with the mobile units of the 11th Army. The command of the Southern Front made efforts to withdraw its troops from the outlined grandiose "cauldron", having reported this to the Headquarters of the Supreme High Command and received the appropriate permission on October 3. On October 4, the 12th Army left Zaporozhye and retreated to the Pavlograd, Vasilkovka, Gavrilovka line. But the main forces of the 18th Army and part of the forces of the 9th Army were surrounded north of Osipenko (in total, up to 6 divisions). The command of the encircled group was headed by the commander of the 18th Army, Andrei Smirnov. This group fought until October 10, when the commander was killed in action during a night breakout attempt. On that day, her main forces were cut into pieces and stopped organized resistance.

The losses of the Soviet troops were great. The German press reported the capture of 100,000 soldiers of the Workers' and Peasants' Red Army, 212 tanks and 672 guns. However, Erich von Manstein, a direct participant in those events, indicated less data in his memoirs: "We captured 65 thousand prisoners, 125 tanks and over 500 guns in a round–robin manner".

On October 5, the commander of the troops of the Southern Front, Dmitry Ryabyshev, and a member of the Military Council, Alexander Zaporozhets, were removed from their posts. Cherevichenko was appointed commander of the front.

At the same time, the lag of the German infantry units from the tank groupings did not allow the German command to create a continuous front of encirclement. The main forces of the 9th and 12th Armies, as well as part of the forces of the 18th Army, managed to break through the scattered battle formations of the enemy. The Headquarters of the Supreme High Command transferred 5 rifle divisions to the Southern Front on October 7 and demanded by October 13 to create a stable front line along the line of the Mius River. The Taganrog Combat Area (3 rifle divisions) was also created. In the north, the 6th Army withdrew 25–30 kilometers by October 11, having managed to pin down the main forces of the 17th German Army.

But the German command acted promptly: already from October 9–10, the main forces began to transfer the main attack to the east, trying to prevent the Soviet troops from gaining a foothold. The 1st German Panzer Army was immediately redirected to the Rostov Direction and by the end of October 13 had reached the Taganrog Region. There, on October 11, the Soviet command hastily created the Taganrog task force consisting of 3 rifle and 3 cavalry divisions, two military schools and a regiment of the People's Commissariat of Internal Affairs (Commander Lieutenant General Fyodor Remezov), which in heavy battles managed to hold back the German offensive.

On October 14, the 9th Army and the Taganrog Combat Area (troops of the Southern Front) launched a counterstrike in the Taganrog area against the enemy's forward units. On this day, they pushed the enemy forward units 10–15 kilometers away. But by the end of the same day, the approaching main forces of the 1st German Panzer Army were thrown into battle on the move. Poorly trained Soviet troops began a hasty retreat, and on their shoulders, German troops broke into Taganrog by nightfall (after street fighting, it was finally captured by the enemy on October 17). By the beginning of November, the troops of the right wing of the Southern Front (12th Army), by order of the Headquarters of the Supreme High Command, withdrew to the Krasny Liman, Debaltsevo line, and the troops of its left wing (18th and 9th Armies), under pressure from superior German forces, to the line Debaltsevo – Krasny Luch – Bolshekrepinskaya – Khapry, where they took up defensive positions. The Donbas Defensive Operation has been completed.

== Operation progress: second stage ==
The German command wanted to make the most of the results achieved: while the hastily created defense of the Soviet troops as a whole was weak, after a short regrouping and pulling up the rear there was a chance to resume a successful offensive. At the same time, having met stubborn resistance on the shortest route to Rostov–on–Don (via Taganrog), von Rundstedt decided to transfer the 1st Panzer Army to the north and strike a deep sweeping blow to Rostov through Dyakovo – Shakhty – Novocherkassk. At the same time, he planned not only to capture Rostov–on–Don, but also to encircle and destroy parts of the 9th and 56th Separate Armies of Lieutenant General Fyodor Remezov (was transferred from the North Caucasus and hastily took up defenses around Rostov–on–Don). An auxiliary blow was delivered to Voroshilovgrad by the forces of the 17th German Army and the Italian Corps.

The Soviet command, with the help of aerial reconnaissance, timely established the transfer of the 1st Panzer Army from the Taganrog Region to the north. In the area of its intended breakthrough, large artillery forces were hastily concentrated and a single system of anti–tank strongholds was being built. The Headquarters of the Supreme Command transferred the 37th Army from its reserve to the troops of the Southwestern Front (Commanded by Major General Anton Lopatin), which was supposed to defeat the 1st German Tank Army with a blow on the northern flank, but its arrival and completion of the concentration in the Kamensk–Shakhtinsky Region was supposed to be completed by mid–November. Until that time, the troops of the Southern Front were obliged to repel the German offensive and to weaken the German tank groupings in every possible way.

On November 5, 1941, German troops resumed their offensive. The Rostov Defensive Operation began. The main blow was struck on the right flank of the 9th Soviet Army, where it was expected. The battle from the very beginning took on an extremely fierce nature, but it no longer had anything to do with the events of a month ago. German tanks slowly "gnawed" the Soviet defenses, significant air forces were striking at them, and strong counterattacks were launched on the enemy's flanks on October 6 and 7. As a result, in the first 6 days of the offensive, the maximum advance of the German troops was only 30 kilometers.

In this situation, Rundstetd ordered Kleist to abandon the deep bypass of Rostov and attack the city from the north, through Kuteinikovo – Bolshiye Saly, transferring a blow to the defense zone of the 56th Soviet Army. Fulfilling this order, from November 11 to 16, Kleist managed to advance another 25 kilometers with continuous battles, and in auxiliary directions the German advance was limited from 5 to 15 kilometers. An attempt by the 13th German Panzer Division to attack along the Taganrog – Rostov–on–Don Railway was repulsed. German troops could no longer break through the Soviet defenses. Heavy losses in tanks undermined the combat capability of the 1st Panzer Army.

By the end of November 16, the 37th Army and the shock groupings of other armies occupied the starting lines for the launch of a counteroffensive. On this day, the Rostov Defensive Operation ended. On November 17, the Red Army began the Rostov Offensive Operation.

== Results of the operation ==
At the initial stage of the operation, in early October 1941, the Soviet troops of the Southern Front suffered a crushing defeat with heavy losses. German troops advanced in a short time from 150 to 300 kilometers, captured the southwestern part of Donbas and reached the approaches to Rostov–on–Don. The reason for the success of the German offensive: the correct timing of the operation, the creation of powerful strike groups, the delivery of strikes at the junction of the Soviet fronts.

However, at the second stage, the Soviet troops created a stable defense and thwarted the plan to capture Rostov–on–Don and a further German offensive in the Caucasus. The troops of the German 1st Panzer Army suffered losses and found themselves in a disadvantageous operational position, which led to their further defeat. A particularly positive role at this stage was played by the massing of Soviet artillery and aviation forces in tank–hazardous areas and the creation of a unified anti–tank defense.

The losses of the Soviet troops during the operation amounted to 143,313 people of irrecoverable losses (killed and died from wounds, but the most significant part – prisoners in October battles), 17,263 people – sanitary losses.

The losses of the German troops amounted to 17,227 people, of which 3,454 people were killed, 660 were missing, 13,113 were wounded. The losses of the Romanian, Italian and Hungarian troops in this operation are not known.

== Sources ==
- Grechko, Andreĭ, ed. (1975). История второй мировой войны 1939–1945 [History of the Second World War 1939–1945] (in Russian). Vol. 4. Moscow: Voenizdat. pp. 116–119.
- Isaev, A. V. (2004). "9". Исаев А. В. От Дубно до Ростова [From Dubna to Rostov] (in Russian). Moscow: Limited Liability Company Publishing House AST: Publishing House Tranzitkniga.
- Krasnykh, I͡u.; Moshchanskiĭ, I. (2006). Voennaia Letopis Битва за Ростов. Операции Южного и Юго Западного фронтов 29 сентября — 2 декабря 1941 года [Battle for Rostov: operations of the Southern and Southwestern Fronts 29 September–2 December 1941] (in Russian). Moscow.
- Krinko, Evgeniĭ (2013). 56-ya armiya v boyah za Rostov. Pervaya pobeda Krasnoy armii. Oktyabr-dekabr 1941 [56th Army in the Battles for Rostov. The First Victory of the Red Army. October–December 1941]. Zabytye armii, zabytye komandarmy [Forgotten Armies. Forgotten Army Commanders] (in Russian). Moscow: Tsentrpoligraf. ISBN 978-5-227-04655-0.
- von Mackensen, Eberhard (2004). От Буга до Кавказа [From the Bug to the Caucasus] (in Russian). Moscow.
- Morozov, Miroslav; Eliseev, V. T.; Kulagin, K. L.; Lipatov, S. A.; Petrov, B. N.; Chernyaev, A. A.; Shabaev, A. A. (2010). Velikai͡a Otechestvennai͡a voĭna 1941-1945 gg. Kampanii i strategicheskie operat͡sii v t͡sifrakh [Great Patriotic War (1941–1945). Campaigns and Strategic Operations in Numbers] (in Russian). Vol. 1. Moscow: MVD Rossii. ISBN 978-5-8129-0099-1.
- Ogarkov, Nikolai, ed. (1979). Военная энциклопедия в 8 томах [Military Encyclopedia in 8 volumes] (in Russian). Vol. 3. Moscow: Voenizdat. pp. 238–239.
- Ogarkov, Nikolai, ed. (1979). Военная энциклопедия в 8 томах [Military Encyclopedia in 8 volumes] (in Russian). Vol. 7. Moscow: Voenizdat. pp. 147–148.
- Riabyshev, D. I. (1990). Zotkin, V. M. (ed.). Первый год войны [The First Year of the War]. VM: Voennye memuary (in Russian). Moscow: Voenizdat.
