= 74th Rifle Division =

74th Rifle Division (1921 – September 27, 1942) 74th Rifle Division (October 14, 1942 - May 1946)
- Active: 1921–1946
- Country: Soviet Union
- Branch: Red Army (1939-46)
- Type: Infantry
- Size: Division
- Engagements: Operation Barbarossa; Donbas–Rostov strategic defensive operation Rostov Defensive Operation; Battle of Rostov (1941); Case Blue; Voronezh–Kastornoye offensive Battle of Kursk; Battle of the Dnieper; Battle of Kiev (1943); Zhitomir–Berdichev offensive Battle of Korsun–Cherkassy; Uman–Botoșani offensive Second Jassy–Kishinev offensive Belgrade offensive Budapest offensive Operation Spring Awakening; Vienna offensive
- Decorations: Order of the Red Banner; Order of Bogdan Khmelnitsky (both 2nd Formation)
- Battle honours: Taman (1st Formation); Kiev; Danube (both 2nd Formation)

Commanders
- Notable commanders: Col. Nikolai Andreevich Veryovkin-Rakhalskii; Maj. Gen. Fyodor Efimovich Sheverdin; Lt. Col. Ivan Mikhailovich Balenko; Maj. Gen. Andronik Abramovich Kazaryan; Col. Mikhail Dmitrievich Kuznetsov; Col. Kutub Gainutdinovich Gizatullin; Maj. Gen. Fyodor Ivanovich Zinovev

The 74th Rifle Division was formed as an infantry division of the Red Army 1921, in the North Caucasus Military District, based on the shtat (table of organization and equipment) for rifle divisions of that period. It was based on a cadre of the 22nd Rifle Division and was given the honorific "Taman" based on that division's performance there during the Russian Civil War. Through most of the 1920s and '30s it remained in the North Caucasus, largely based at Krasnodar, but prior to the German/Romanian invasion of south Ukraine in early July 1941 it was assigned to 9th Army, which soon became part of Southern Front. After being forced back across the Dniestr and Dniepr the division was reassigned to 12th Army of the same Front in September. It escaped destruction as 1st Panzer Army swept toward Rostov-on-Don in November, then took up positions along the Mius River for the winter after the city was liberated later that month. In early July 1942 it was caught up in the German summer offensive into the Caucasus steppe and took heavy losses in the retreat, toward the end as part of 37th Army, and finally being disbanded on September 27.

== 1st Formation ==
The 74th was first formed at Novorossiysk in the North Caucasus Military District during 1921, largely based on a cadre from the 22nd Rifle Division. From 1926 to 1931 it was under command of Col. Nikolai Andreevich Veryovkin-Rakhalskii, with Leonid Grigorevich Petrovskii serving as his chief of staff for the first two years. Through most of the 1920s and '30s it was stationed at Krasnodar. After the numbering of the regiments of the rifle divisions was "scrambled" in September 1939 for security and intelligence reasons the division's order of battle was as follows:

- 79th Rifle Regiment
- 109th Rifle Regiment
- 360th Rifle Regiment
- 6th Artillery Regiment (until August 14, 1942)
- 81st Howitzer Artillery Regiment (until November 15, 1941)
- 142nd Antitank Battalion
- 274th Antiaircraft Battalion
- 111th Reconnaissance Battalion
- 110th Sapper Battalion
- 113th Signal Battalion
- 19th Medical/Sanitation Battalion
- 111th Chemical Defense (Anti-gas) Platoon
- 16th Motor Transport Battalion
- 11th Motorized Field Bakery
- 197th Field Postal Station
- 209th Field Office of the State Bank

In addition to the division's honorary "Taman" title the 78th Rifle Regiment had thrice received the Order of the Red Banner, and the 109th Regiment once, both for excellence in training and peacetime maneuvers. The 111th Reconnaissance Battalion had a number of T-26 tanks, which were better armored and harder-hitting than the authorized T-38 or T-40. The division had been under command of Col. Fyodor Efimovich Sheverdin since February 28, 1939; this officer had previously led the 250th Rifle Regiment and would be promoted to the rank of major general on December 27, 1941.

== Defense of Ukraine ==
At the outbreak of the Axis invasion on June 22, 1941, the 74th was in 9th Army on the southern end of the front, part of the 48th Rifle Corps with the 30th Mountain Rifle Division. It was positioned along the Prut River in the Moldavian SSR, facing the southern group of Army Group South, which consisted of the German 11th Army and the Romanian 3rd and 4th Armies. Fighting on this front did not begin immediately, and on June 25 Southern Front, under command of Col. Gen. I. V. Tyulenev, was formed from the Odessa Military District, with 9th Army and 18th Army under command. By July 1, 48th Corps consisted of the 75th and 176th Rifle Divisions.

The Axis offensive began on July 2. The plan of the Army Group commander, Field Marshal G. von Rundstedt, was to use the German 11th and 17th Armies to encircle most of Southern Front while the Romanian armies cleared the coast of the Black Sea and secured Odesa. 11th Army penetrated the Red Army defenses, captured Iași, and reached the Prut on the first day, while also fending off counterattacks by 9th Army and 2nd Mechanized Corps. Tyulenev overestimated the Axis strength and asked permission to withdraw to the Dniestr which was granted, but later rescinded, and he was ordered to retake the line of the Prut; the line temporarily stabilized between the two while 18th Army protected the left flank of Southwestern Front by digging in at Mohyliv-Podilskyi. By July 10 the 30th Mountain Division had returned to 48th Corps, but was detached again by the start of August.

During the fighting in Moldova the commander of the 109th Rifle Regiment, Col. Afanasi Vasilevich Lapshov, distinguished himself sufficiently to be made a Hero of the Soviet Union. He led his regiment in several counterattacks during the defensive battles, near the city of Bălți and the village of Florești, in which two Romanian regiments were routed. With a small detachment of his men he held a crossing over the Dniestr for two days, becoming encircled before breaking out with his troops, most of their equipment, and the regimental documents and banner. On March 27, 1942, Lapshov would receive his Gold Star. By then he was in command of the 259th Rifle Division near Leningrad, and was promoted to major general on May 13. He later trained at the Voroshilov Academy before taking command of the 16th Guards Rifle Corps in April 1943. He was killed in action on July 14 during Operation Kutuzov.

=== Battles in the Donbas ===
In September 1941 the 74th was transferred to 12th Army, in the same Front, and it would remain under this command until July 1942. During the same month Southwestern Front was largely encircled and destroyed east of Kyiv. While the German offensive focus now turned to Moscow and Leningrad, Army Group South was ordered to advance on Kharkiv, the Donbas and Rostov-na-Donu. Attacking from the march south of Poltava the 1st Panzer Army quickly smashed the defenses of 12th Army then raced on to Melitopol, encircling six divisions of 9th and 18th Armies on October 7. The panzers then pursued along the coast of the Sea of Azov, reaching the Mius River on October 13 before halting to regroup. As of the start of November the retreating 12th Army had just five weakened rifle divisions under command. During the pause in operations the Army took up new defenses along the Mius along with the escaped elements of the 9th and 18th and the newly arrived 56th Army. On November 21 the 1st Panzer Army captured Rostov but the thrust to reach the city opened a gap between it and 17th Army to the west that was soon exploited by 37th Army. Shortly after the 9th and 56th Armies attacked the southern and eastern flanks of 1st Panzer and by November 29 had cleared the city.

=== Case Blue ===
On May 19 General Sheverdin left the 74th to study at the Military Academy of the General Staff. He would return to the front in November to take command of the 14th Rifle Corps, and would later lead the 27th Guards Rifle Corps and the 74th Rifle Corps before being wounded and hospitalized on July 27, 1944. He did not return to the front and retired in September 1946. He was replaced by Lt. Col. Ivan Mikhailovich Balenko, who would lead the division until it was disbanded.

12th Army, which still consisted of five rather shopworn divisions under command of Maj. Gen. A. A. Grechko, largely escaped the defeat of the northern armies of Southern Front in the Second Battle of Kharkov, but was left facing the southern prong of the German summer offensive on an overextended frontage. It was on the Front's right flank, tying into 9th Army in Southwestern Front. Grechko had the 74th, 4th, and 261st Rifle Divisions in first echelon, backed by the 176th and 349th, but had no armor at all. The 1st Panzer and 17th Armies launched their attack on July 8. The next day the IV and LII Army Corps advanced from the area of Artemivsk toward Voroshilovgrad, pushing 12th Army back toward the Northern Donets River.

In the first weeks of the German offensive the 12th Army was forced back from its positions along the lower Don River; by July 25 the division had been moved to 37th Army and was helping to hold a 65km-wide sector from Bogaevskaya (Ashinov) (50km east of Rostov) eastward to Konstantinovskaya (115km east of Rostov) opposite 4th Panzer Army's XXXX Panzer Corps. By the beginning of August the 109th Rifle Regiment had returned 12th Army, fighting as a separate unit. The remainder of the division was parted out to units in 37th Army, and it was officially disbanded on September 27.

== 2nd Formation ==
A new 74th Rifle Division was formed on October 14, 1942, based on the 134th Kursant (Student) Rifle Brigade, in the 13th Army of Bryansk Front.

=== 134th Rifle Brigade ===
This was formed during December 1941 - March 1942 in the Volga Military District, from where it was moved to the Reserve of the Supreme High Command in April. From there, in late May, it was assigned to 3rd Army in Bryansk Front. When it arrived it consisted of:

- 4 rifle battalions
- 1 artillery battalion (76mm cannons)
- 1 machine gun company (12-16 HMGs)
- 1 mortar company (16 82mm mortars)
- 1 antitank rifle company (27 antitank rifles)
- 1 sapper company
- signal and reconnaissance platoons
- medical and transport companies

As can be seen, the brigade was without critical heavy weapons, such as antitank guns and 120mm mortars. It was best suited to a relatively quiet front like that held by 3rd Army during the German summer offensive. In August it was moved south to 13th Army in the same Front, and it was here that it was rebuilt as the 74th Rifle Division.
