= Pyotr Gnido =

Soviet fighter pilot (1919–2006)

- Пётр Андреевич Гнидо; Петро Андрійович Гнидо
- Born: 22 December 1919; Berezivka Raion, Odesa Oblast, Ukrainian People's Republic
- Died: 17 March 2006 (aged 86); Odesa, Ukraine
- Military career
- Allegiance: Soviet Union
- Branch: Soviet Air Forces
- Service years: 1939–1975
- Rank: Major general
- Conflicts: World War II
- Awards: Hero of the Soviet Union

Pyotr Andreyevich Gnido (Russian: Пётр Андреевич Гнидо, Ukrainian: Петро Андрійович Гнидо; 22 December 1919 – 17 March 2006) was a Soviet fighter pilot during World War II who was credited with 34 solo and 6 shared aerial victories, and recipient of the title of Hero of the Soviet Union.

== Early life ==
Gnido was born on 22 December 1919 in the village of Starodonskaya Balka in Odesa region of Ukraine, into a peasant family of Ukrainian ethnicity. After graduating from 7th grade of school, he worked at a mechanical plant in Odesa. In 1937, he graduated from the Odesa Medical College, after which he worked in the NKVD as a sanitary instructor and later as head of the sanitary service in Astrakhan Oblast of the Russian SFSR. In 1939, he graduated from the Astrakhan Aeroclub.

== Military career ==
In 1940, he was drafted into the Red Army. On the same year, he successfully graduated from the Stalingrad Military Aviation School of Pilots and joined the Soviet Air Forces. He continued to serve as an instructor pilot.

=== World War II ===
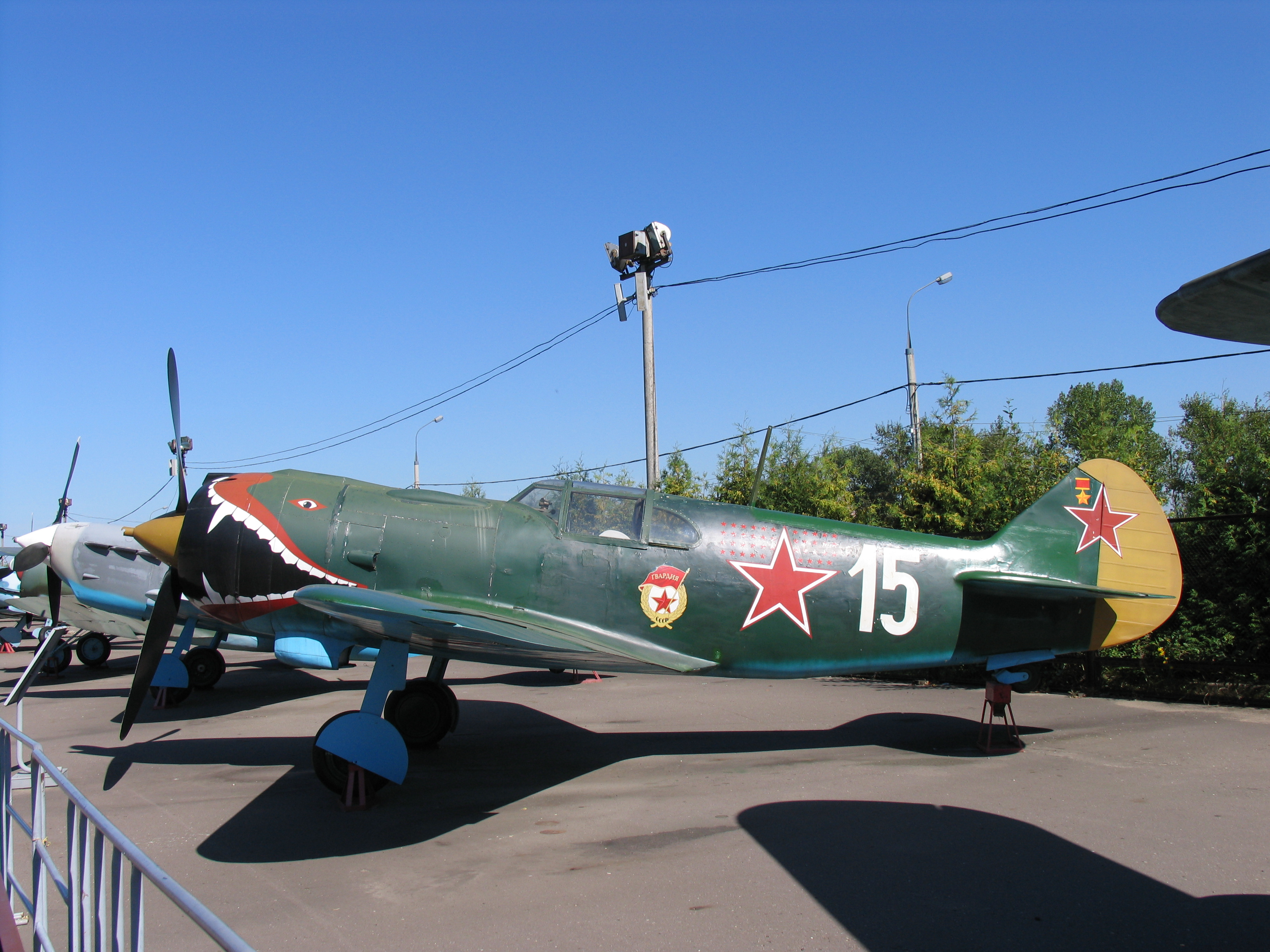
Lavochkin La-5

Following the outbreak of Operation Barbarossa on 22 June 1941, Gnido participated in the Tiraspol-Melitopol, Donbas and Rostov operations. On 12 December 1941, Gnido rammed a Luftwaffe Heinkel He 111 bomber, with his Polikarpov I-16 fighter. While he was seriously wounded, he managed to bail out of his aircraft.

In March 1942, Gnido was discharged from a hospital in Grozny and enrolled in a reserve regiment, where he mastered in flying the Lavochkin-Gorbunov-Gudkov LaGG-3 and Lavochkin La-5 fighters. In July 1942, he returned to the front. He took part in Stalingrad, Southeast, South and North Caucasian fronts. Gnido took part in the Battle of Stalingrad and the Rostov offensive operation in 1943.

During the battle of Stalingrad, while flying La-5, Gnido shot down ten enemy aircraft, which includes seven He 111 bombers and three Messerschmitt Bf 110 fighter-bombers in heavy air battles against Luftwaffe, which tried to establish an air bridge to the besieged 6th Army of German Field Marshal Friedrich Paulus. He flew combat sorties over Donbas during the Izyum–Barvenkovo offensive of 1943.

In March 1943, he commanded a squadron of the 13th Fighter Aviation Regiment of the 201st Fighter Aviation Division within the 2nd Mixed Aviation Corps of 8th Air Army in the Southern Front. By that time, he had flown 206 sorties and took part in 43 air battles, shooting down 14 enemy aircraft personally and 6 in group.

By the decree of the Presidium of the Supreme Soviet of the Soviet Union from on 1 May 1943, for courage and heroism in the "front of the struggle against the German invaders", Gnido was awarded the title Hero of the Soviet Union with the award of the Order of Lenin.

Gnido flew missions while assigned to the North Caucasian, Voronezh, 1st and 4th Ukrainian Fronts. He took part in the Kursk, Dnieper, Korsun–Cherkassy, Proskurov-Chernivtsi, Carpathian-Uzhhorod, East Carpathian and Moravian-Ostrava operations.

His final tally accumulated through the course of approximately 412 sorties and 82 dogfights officially stands at 34 solo and six shared shootdowns. He was wounded three times and was shot down four times.

On 24 June 1945, he took part in the Victory Parade on Red Square in Moscow.

=== Post war ===
After the war, he continued his service in the Soviet Air Forces. In 1952, Lieutenant Colonel Gnido graduated from the Air Force Academy. From 1952 to 1956, he commanded a fighter regiment and from 1956 to 1957, he was deputy commander for flight training of the 26th Fighter Aviation Division of 22nd Air Army.

In January 1957, Gnido was appointed as the commander of the 26th Fighter Aviation Division. He graduated from Military Academy of the General Staff of the Armed Forces of the Soviet Union on 1960. From July 1960, he was assigned to the Strategic Missile Forces of the USSR and served as the deputy commander of a missile division.

From February 1961, he served as commander of the 50th Missile Division in the Zhytomyr Oblast of the Ukrainian SSR. On 1963, he was promoted to the rank of major general. From July 1964, he served as deputy commander of Separate Guards Missile Corps. In June 1970, he was appointed as the deputy commander for combat training and member of the military council of the 33rd Guards Missile Army in Omsk.

In November 1975, Gnido was transferred to the reserves.

== Later life ==
After his retirement, Gnido lived in Odesa where he worked as the chairman of the trade union committee of the regional repair and construction trust. He died on 17 March 2006 and was buried at the Novogorodsky Cemetery in Odesa.

== Awards and decorations ==
USSR

Hero of the Soviet Union (1 May 1943)
Order of Lenin (1 May 1943)
Order of the Red Banner, four times (22 September 1942, 11 September 1943, 22 May 1945, 1957)
Order of Alexander Nevsky (14 August 1944)
Order of the Red Banner of Labour (1969)
Order of the Patriotic War, 1st class, twice (27 April 1943, 11 March 1985)
Order of the Red Star, thrice (23 February 1942, 1947, 1954)
Order "For Service to the Homeland in the Armed Forces of the USSR", 3rd class (1975)
Medal "For Battle Merit"
Medal "For the Defence of Stalingrad" (1942)
Medal "For the Defence of the Caucasus" (1944)
Medal "For the Victory over Germany in the Great Patriotic War 1941–1945" (1945)

- jubilee medals

Czechoslovakia

War Cross 1939–1945

Ukraine

Order of Bohdan Khmelnytsky, 2nd class
Order of Bohdan Khmelnytsky, 3rd class
Defender of the Motherland Medal
Jubilee Medal "60 Years of Liberation of Ukraine from Fascist Invaders"
