= Fyodor Kharitonov =

Soviet general

Fyodor Mikhailovich Kharitonov
- Фёдор Михайлович Харитонов
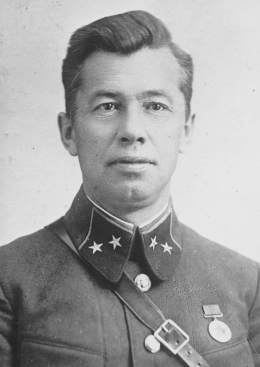
- Born: 24 January 1899; Vasilievskoe, Yaroslavl Governorate, Russian Empire
- Died: 28 May 1943 (aged 44); Moscow, Soviet Union
- Military career
- Allegiance: Soviet Union
- Branch: Infantry
- Service years: 1919–1943
- Rank: Lieutenant General
- Commands: Deputy Chief of Staff of the Southern Front; 9th Army; 6th Army
- Conflicts: Russian Civil War; World War II; Eastern Front
- Awards: Order of the Red Banner; Order of Kutuzov; Jubilee Medal "XX Years of the Workers' and Peasants' Red Army"

Fyodor Mikhailovich Kharitonov (24 January 1899 – 28 May 1943) was a Soviet military leader, participant of the Great Patriotic War, Lieutenant General.

== Biography ==
Born on 24 January 1899 in the village of Vasilievskoye (now within the city limits of Rybinsk). He graduated from a four–year school in his native village (now School No. 7).

In the Workers' and Peasants' Red Army since 1919. Member of the Civil War, Red Army soldier. Member of the Russian Communist Party (Bolsheviks) since 1918.

Since the spring of 1941 – the commander of the 2nd Airborne Corps. During the Great Patriotic War, from July 1941, Deputy Chief of Staff of the Southern Front, from September 1941, Commander of the 9th Army of the Southern Front, from July 1942, Commander of the 6th Army of the Voronezh, later of the Southwestern Front.

With the direct participation of the army under the command of General Kharitonov, the Donbass–Rostov Strategic Defensive Operation, the Rostov Offensive Operation of 1941, the Battle of Stalingrad, the Ostrogozhsk–Rossosh Operation, the Donbass Offensive Operation, the Kharkov Defensive Operation and some others were prepared and carried out. He died on 28 May 1943 from a serious illness.

== Remembrance ==
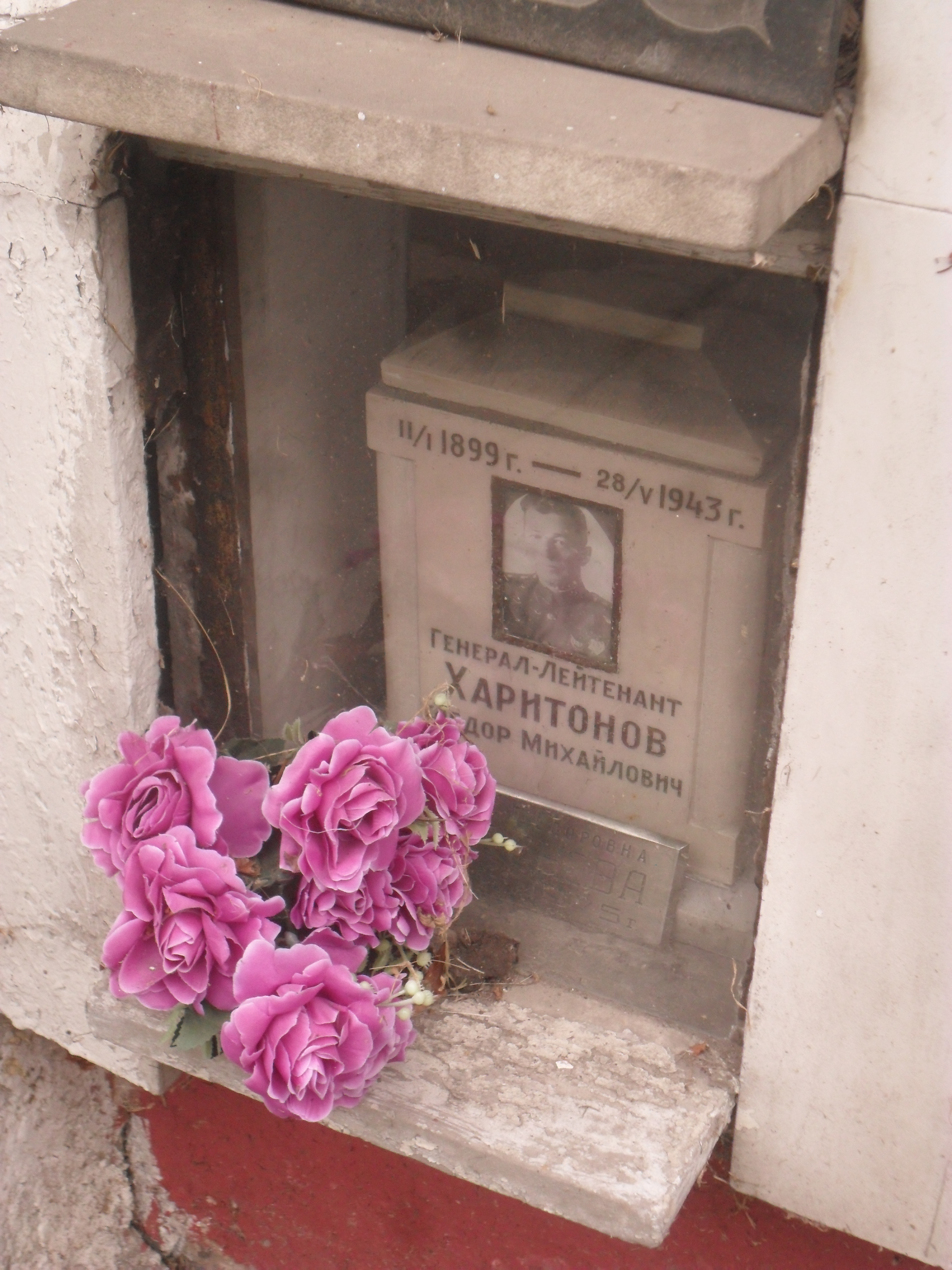
Kharitonov's columbarium slab at the Novodevichy Cemetery in Moscow

The Yaroslavl Military Infantry School was named after him. The monument to the general was installed in the city of Rybinsk, sculptor Matvey Manizer. On 6 May 2007, in the homeland of Fyodor Kharitonov, on the banks of the Volga River in the village of Vasilievskoye, a monument was erected in his honor. A memorial plaque is installed on the house where Kharitonov was born.

Streets in Yaroslavl and Rybinsk bear the name of Kharitonov. The latter is directly related to him: it was on her that he was born and spent his childhood.

General Fyodor Kharitonov is dedicated to the story of Mark Kolosov and the feature film of the same name "Comrade General" (1973) based on it (in which the name of the protagonist was changed into Kapitonov, but the name and patronymic remained the same – Fyodor Mikhailovich).

== Awards ==
- Order of the Red Banner (22 October 1941)
- Order of Kutuzov, 1st Class (28 January 1943)
- Jubilee Medal "XX Years of the Workers' and Peasants' Red Army"

== Sources ==
- "Tashkent" – Rifle Cell / [Edited by Andrey Grechko] – Moscow: Military Publishing House of the Ministry of Defense of the Soviet Union, 1976 – 690 Pages – (Soviet Military Encyclopedia: [In 8 Volumes]; 1976–1980, Volume 8)
- The Great Patriotic War, 1941–1945: Encyclopedia / Edited by Mikhail Kozlov – Moscow: Soviet Encyclopedia, 1985 – Page 767 – 500,000 Copies
- Albert Domank, Richard Portugalsky. Army Commander Kharitonov. Yaroslavl: Upper Volga Book Publishing House, 1989. 176 Pages
