= Andrey Smirnov (general) =

Soviet general (1895–1941)

Andrey Kirillovich Smirnov
- Андрей Кириллович Смирнов
- Lieutenant General Andrey Smirnov
- Born: August 27, 1895; Saint Petersburg, Russian Empire
- Died: October 8, 1941 (aged 46); Zaporizhzhia Oblast, Ukrainian SSR, Soviet Union
- Military career
- Allegiance: Russian Empire; Russian Socialist Federative Soviet Republic; Soviet Union
- Branch: Infantry
- Service years: 1915–1917; 1918–1941
- Rank: Lieutenant; Lieutenant General
- Commands: Kharkov Military District; 18th Army
- Conflicts: World War I Russian Civil War; World War II
- Awards: Order of Lenin; Order of the Red Banner; Order of the Patriotic War; Jubilee Medal "20 Years of the Workers' and Peasants' Red Army"

Andrey Kirillovich Smirnov (Russian: Андрей Кириллович Смирнов; August 27, 1895 – October 8, 1941) was a Soviet general who served as commander of the 18th Army, during World War II, lieutenant general (June 4, 1940).

== Biography ==
Smirnov was born on August 27, 1895, in Saint Petersburg to nobles.

=== World War I and Russian Civil War ===
In 1915, he was called up for military service in the Russian Imperial Army. He graduated from the Vladimir Military School in 1916. He took part in the battles of World War I from January 1916, when, with the rank of warrant officer, he was sent to the post of junior officer in the 138th Infantry Bolkhov Regiment. As part of the regiment, he fought in the 35th Infantry Division of the 8th and in the 11th (from May 1916) Armies of the Southwestern Front. For military distinctions, he received the military ranks of second lieutenant and lieutenant out of turn. On October 14, 1916, the company commander, Smirnov, was wounded in a battle near the village of Zvyzhen near Brody.

In November 1917, he was demobilized and immediately entered the Red Guard, was an instructor in combat training of the Red Guard detachments.

In the Red Army since February 1918, joining it as one of the first volunteers. During the Russian Civil War, Smirnov commanded a platoon of the 1st Red Army Regiment, was the head of the regimental school of the 1st Reserve Regiment, and commanded a battalion of the 504th Infantry Regiment. From November 1919, he fought in the 56th Moscow Rifle Division: commander of the 504th Rifle Regiment, commander of the 166th Rifle Brigade.

=== Interwar period ===
After graduating from the Higher Academic Courses in 1922, Smirnov served from August of this year as commander of the 168th Infantry Regiment, from August 1923 – commander of the 58th Infantry Regiment, from October 1923 – assistant commander of the 56th Infantry Division in the Moscow Military District. Since January 1924 – assistant commander of the 10th Infantry Division of the Leningrad Military District. He graduated from the Military Academy of the Workers' and Peasants' Red Army Named After Mikhail Frunze in 1927. He served as the head of the 4th Department at the headquarters of the Caucasian Red Banner Army. In 1927, he joined the All–Union Communist Party (Bolsheviks).

From October 1929 – assistant commander, and from November 1929 – commander of the 4th Turkestan Rifle Division in the Leningrad Military District. From February 1930 – commander (from August 1931 also military commissar) of the 12th Infantry Division of the Separate Red Banner Far Eastern Army. Serving in 1935 as the chief of staff of the 35th Infantry Regiment of the 12th Division, Afanasy Beloborodov, the future general of the army, spoke about the service with the division commander Smirnov, who was distinguished by his rudeness in dealing with his subordinates:

And the work is going well, and you want to work, but you have to run from the division. It is impossible to live with the division commander.

Proskuryakov, chief of staff of the training artillery battalion, added in the same vein:

Stuffy. There is nothing to breathe. They interfere with you with dirt, and you are silent.

At the same time, other memoirists note that Smirnov had a broad military outlook, was fluent in French, Arabic and Persian, and had great willpower.

From June 1936 – commander and military commissar of the 39th Rifle Corps, from July 1937 – deputy commander of the Primorsky Group of Forces of the Special Red Banner Far Eastern Army. From December 1938 – head of the Higher Tactical Shooting Courses for the Improvement of Infantry Command Staff «Shot», from September 1939 – head of the Directorate of Military Educational Institutions of the Workers' and Peasants' Red Army. From July 26, 1940 – Inspector General of the Red Army Infantry.

With the introduction of general ranks in the Workers' and Peasants' Red Army on June 4, 1940, Smirnov was awarded the military rank of lieutenant general. In December 1940, he was appointed commander of the Kharkov Military District.

=== World War II ===
From the beginning of the German-Soviet War of World War II, he commanded the 18th Army of the Southern Front, whose troops fought heavy defensive battles on the southern wing of the Soviet–German front. The army participated in the border battles in Moldova, in the Tiraspol–Melitopol and Uman defensive operations. In their course, the army defended itself in the Kamenetz–Podolsky and Mogilev–Podolsky fortified regions, then with battles retreated to the line of Voznesensk, Marinovka, Bolshaya Vradievka and went on the defensive. By mid–August, the troops retreated beyond the Dnieper, and by the end of September – to the line between the Dnieper Floodplains (south of Zaporizhzhia) and Molochnyi Lyman.

During the Donbass–Rostov Defensive Operation, the main forces of the 18th Army were surrounded by the enemy from the north. While trying to break out of the encirclement, Lieutenant General Smirnov died in battle on October 8, 1941, near the village of Popivka (according to other sources, near the village of Andreevka) in Zaporizhzhia Oblast. There are different versions about the circumstances of the death of Andrey Smirnov: according to one version, he died in a night battle while trying to break out of the encirclement, according to another, at a critical moment in the battle, he shot himself to avoid capture.

==== Refusal to evacuate ====
During the Great Patriotic War, there was a practice of evacuating the senior command staff of large encircled groups of the Red Army. So Semyon Budyonny was taken by plane from the cauldron at the Battle of Kiev. From the encircled Sevastopol, all the high command was taken out in submarines, including the commander of the garrison, Ivan Petrov. According to some reports, Stalin also offered evacuation to Smirnov, for which a special plane was sent, but Smirnov did not leave his troops, fulfilling his military duty to the end.

He was buried in the village of Smyrnove, Zaporizhzhia Oblast.

== Military ranks ==
- Ensign (January 1, 1916);
- Second lieutenant (1916, for military distinctions);
- Lieutenant (1917, for military distinctions);
- Division commander (February 17, 1936);
- Corps commander (November 4, 1939);
- Lieutenant general (June 4, 1940).

== Awards ==
- Order of Lenin (August 16, 1936);
- 2 Orders of the Red Banner (December 20, 1920; May 31, 1922);
- Order of the Patriotic War, 1st Class (May 6, 1965, posthumously);
- Medal "20 Years of the Workers' and Peasants' Red Army" (February 22, 1938).

== Sources ==
- The Team of Authors. The Great Patriotic War. Army Commanders. Military Biographical Dictionary / Edited by Mikhail Vozhakin – Moscow; Zhukovsky: Kuchkovo Field, 2005 – Pages 211–213 – ISBN 5-86090-113-5
- Denis Solovyov. All Stalin's Generals – Moscow, 2019 – ISBN 978-5-532-10644-4 – Page 80
- On the Eve of the War. Materials of the Meeting of the Top Leadership of the Workers' and Peasants' Red Army on December 23–31, 1940 – Russian Archive: Great Patriotic War. Volume 12 (1) – Moscow: "Terra", 1993
- Kovalenko I. I. Military Events in the Melitopol Region in September–October 1941 // "Melitopol Local History Journal" – 2014 – No. 4 – Pages 49–67
