= Semyonovsky Fortress =

Coordinates: 47.1386°N 38.4954°E

Semenovskaya fortress
- Семёновская крепость (Russian)
- Location within Russia
- Type: Fortress and Museum
- Location: the mouth of the river Mius Rostov oblast Russia

History
- Built: 1698

Semenovskaya Fortress (Russian: Семёновская крепость) is a fortification that existed at the end of the 17th and in the early 18th century at the mouth of the river Mius of Rostov region, on the southern outskirts of the village of Beglitz.

== History ==
It is known that in the autumn of 1674 a voivode was sent from Moscow to the Don, Prince P. I. Khovansky-Snake for the construction of a fortress on the Miyus River. This idea was not realized then because they did not find a good place to build the fortress. The fortress was built later in 1698 and became known as Mius. Later it was renamed the Semyonovsky Fortress.

The structure was built in the form of an irregular rectangle with 4 bastions and 2 half-bastions.

As of 1699, the garrison had 421 men among whom were spearmen, riders and soldiers. At the same time, the Cossacks began to be in the fortress who were inspecting merchant vessels passing through. In 1711 the fortress was partially destroyed.

In the 21st century, the outlines of the fortress are seen on the banks of the Miusskiy Liman. Part of the fortress is washed by the coastline. At times, archaeological research and excavations are carried out on the territory of the former fortress. During the research, elements of ceramics and smoking pipes were found.
