= Krynka (river) =

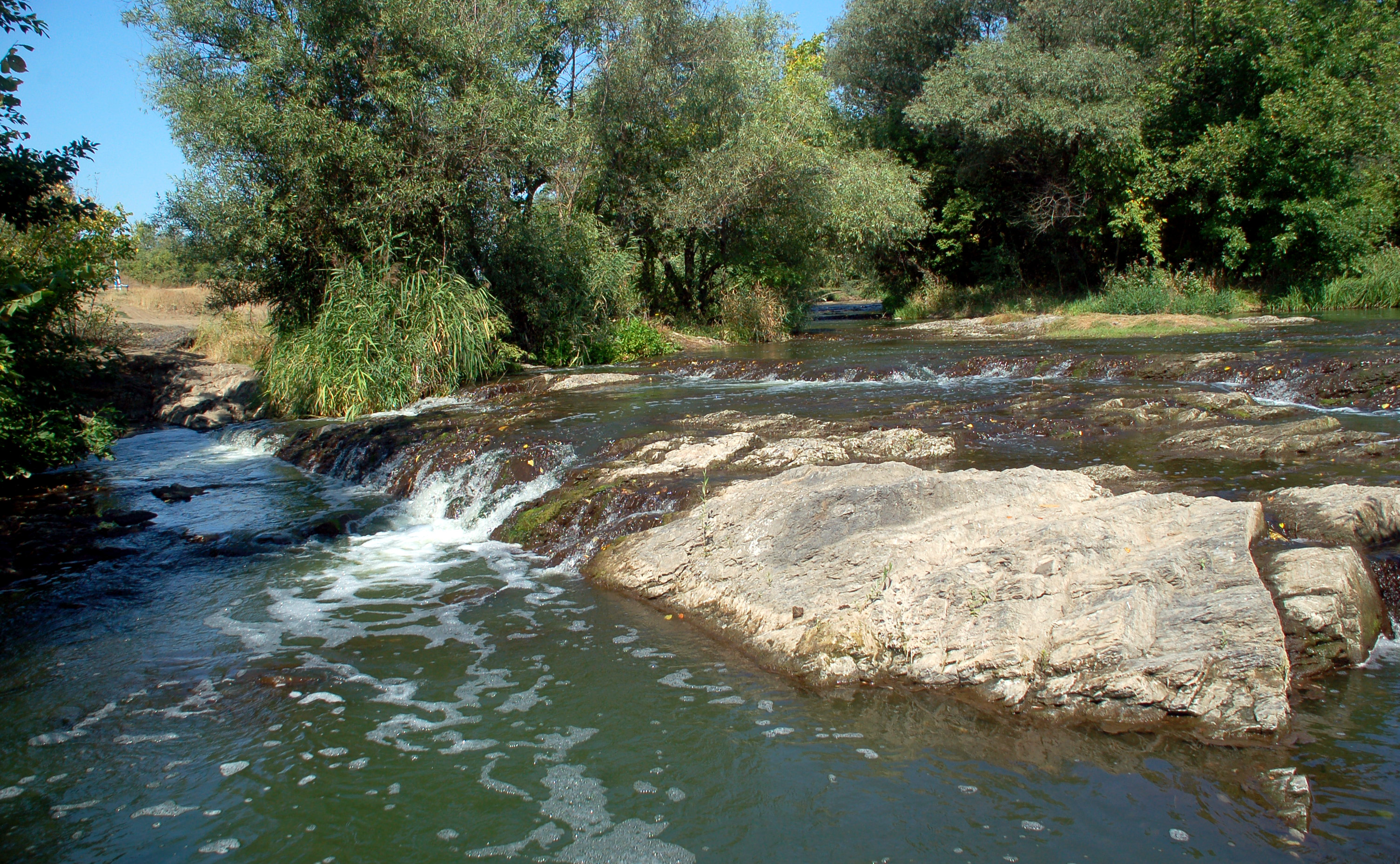

Location
- Country: Ukraine, Russia

Physical characteristics
- Source
  - location: Luhansk Oblast, Ukraine
- Mouth
  - location: Mius
  - coordinates: 47°36′38″N 38°48′27″E
- Length: 180 km (110 mi)
- Basin size: 2,634 km^{2} (1,017 sq mi)

Basin features
- Progression: Mius→ Sea of Azov

The Krynka (Ukrainian: Кринка; Russian: Крынка) is a river in Ukraine, 180 km in length, a right tributary of the Mius, in the basin of the Sea of Azov. The Krynka finds its source in Luhansk Oblast.
