= Anton Lopatin =

Soviet lieutenant general (1897–1965)

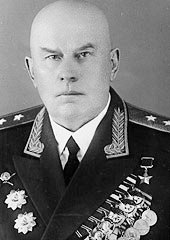
- Born: 18 January 1897; Russian Empire
- Died: 9 April 1965 (aged 68) USSR
- Allegiance: Soviet Union
- Commands: 6th Cavalry Division; 31st Rifle Corps; 9th Army; 37th Army; 62nd Army; 34th Army; 11th Army; 20th Army; 13th Guards Corps; 2nd Rifle Corps
- Awards: Hero of the Soviet Union

Anton Ivanovich Lopatin (Russian: Антон Иванович Лопатин; 18 January 1897 – 9 April 1965) was a Soviet Army lieutenant general who held field army and corps command during World War II. Lopatin was awarded the title Hero of the Soviet Union of his leadership of a corps in the Battle of Königsberg.

== Early life, World War I and Russian Civil War ==
Anton Ivanovich Lopatin was born in a peasant family on 18 January 1897 in the village of Kamenka, now in Brest District of Brest Oblast, Belarus. Conscripted into the Imperial Russian Army in 1916, he fought on the Southwestern Front as a ryadovoy. He served in the Red Army from August 1918. During the Russian Civil War, he fought in battles on the Southern Front against the Whites and in the Polish–Soviet War with the 21st Cavalry Regiment of the 4th Cavalry Division (part of the 1st Cavalry Army from November 1919).

== Interwar period ==
After the end of the war, Lopatin continued to serve with the 21st Cavalry Regiment as a squadron commander and chief of the regimental school. In 1927, Lopatin graduated from the Leningrad Cavalry Commanders' Improvement Courses. After graduating from the training courses for assistant regimental commanders at the Leningrad Cavalry School in 1929, he served as assistant commander of the 21st Cavalry Regiment for personnel, and then as assistant commander of the regiment for supply. From December 1930 he was chief of supply of the 4th Cavalry Division. From November 1931 he commanded the 39th Cavalry Regiment, transferring to command the 32nd Cavalry Regiment in December 1936. In July 1937 he became commander of the 6th Cavalry Division. From September 1938 he was a tactics instructor at the Cavalry Commanders' Improvement Courses, and from July 1939 served as inspector of cavalry in the Transbaikal Military District. In June 1940 he received the rank of major general and was appointed deputy commander of the 15th Army of the Far Eastern Front. Lopatin was transferred west in November 1940 to command the 31st Rifle Corps of the Kiev Special Military District.

== World War II ==
After the German invasion of the Soviet Union began, Lopatin commanded the corps as part of the 5th Army of the Southwestern Front in the border battles, the Battle of Kiev, and the battles near Lutsk. In late October he was appointed commander of the 37th Army of the Southern Front, which he led in the Battle of Rostov. He was promoted to lieutenant general on 27 March 1942. During June and July 1942 he commanded the 9th Army of the Southwestern Front, which stopped the German advance in the Donbass and the Don river bend. In August he was appointed commander of the 62nd Army of the Southeastern Front near Stalingrad. In October he was sent by Stavka to the Northwestern Front, and appointed commander of the 34th Army. In March 1943 he transferred to command the 11th Army of the front. In these positions he took part in the Demyansk operation, then in September 1943 became commander of the 20th Army of the Kalinin Front.

In January 1944 Lopatin was reduced to deputy commander of the 43rd Army of the 1st Baltic Front, which took part in Operation Bagration. In July he was appointed commander of the army's 13th Guards Rifle Corps at his own request, which took part in the advance into the Baltics and the East Prussian offensive. The corps ended the war in the Samland offensive, overcoming German fortifications and capturing the cities of Gross-Haidenburg, Zimmerbude, and Payze.

Lopatin was sent to the Far East in preparation for the Soviet invasion of Manchuria, taking command of the 2nd Separate Rifle Corps in July 1945. The corps crossed the Argun at dawn on 9 August, rapidly crossed the Khairkhan mountain, and advancing 180 kilometers in four days, in conjunction with the mobile units of the 36th Army, captured Yakeshi station, cutting off the retreat for the Japanese Hailar grouping. Then the corps took the main passes of the Greater Khingan and the station of Bukhedu,

== Postwar ==
After the end of the war, graduating from the Higher Academic Courses at the Voroshilov Higher Military Academy, Lopatin served as assistant commander of the 7th Guards Army of the Transcaucasus Military District. In April 1947, he was appointed commander of the 13th Rifle Corps, and in September of that year assistant commander of the Transcaucasus Military District. In July 1949 he transferred to the Belorussian Military District to command the 9th Guards Rifle Corps. In January 1954 he was retired due to illness. Lopatin died in Moscow on 9 April 1965 and was buried at the Novodevichy Cemetery.

== Decorations ==
Lopatin received the following decorations:

- Hero of the Soviet Union
- Order of Lenin (3)
- Order of the Red Banner (3)
- Order of Kutuzov, 1st class (2)
- Order of the Red Star
