= Yakov Cherevichenko =

Soviet general (1894–1976)

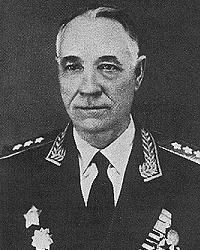
- Born: 12 October 1894; Novosyolovka, Russian Empire
- Died: 4 July 1976 (aged 81)
- Military career
- Allegiance: Russian Empire; Soviet Russia; Soviet Union
- Branch: (Russian Empire) Imperial Russian Army; Red Army / Soviet Army
- Service years: 1914–1917; 1918–1950
- Rank: Colonel-general
- Commands: Odessa Military District (1940 – June 1941); 9th Army (June – September 1941); 2nd Army (September – October 1941); Southern Front (October – December 1941); Bryansk Front (December 1941 – April 1942); Black Sea Group of Forces (August 1942 – October 1942); 5th Army (October 1942 – February 1943); Kharkov Military District (September 1943 – January 1944)
- Conflicts: World War I; Russian Civil War; World War II; Battle of Rostov; Battle of Moscow; Battle of Berlin
- Awards: Order of Lenin (2x); Order of the Red Banner (4x); Order of Kutuzov, 1st class; Order of Suvorov, 2nd class; Order of the Red Star and other awards

Yakov Timofeyevich Cherevichenko (Russian: Я́ков Тимофе́евич Черевиче́нко; 12 October 1894 – 4 July 1976) was a Soviet military leader and colonel general.

== Biography ==
=== First World War and Civil War ===
Yakov Cherevichenko was born to peasant parents in the village of Novosyolovka in the Russian Empire (now in Rostov Oblast, Russian Federation). He was conscripted into the Imperial Russian Army at the beginning of the First World War in 1914 and was a senior NCO by the time of the October Revolution in 1917.

Cherevichenko returned to his native region to organize a partisan group to defend the newly formed Bolshevik government against the anti-Bolshevik White movement after the Revolution, and this group became part of the Red Army in October 1918. Cherevichenko joined the Bolshevik Party at the height of the Russian Civil War in 1919 and served in the 1st Cavalry Army.

=== Between the wars ===
Cherevichenko attended the Red Army's Higher Cavalry School in 1924 and graduated from the Frunze Military Academy in 1935. He was awarded the rank of lieutenant-general when the traditional general officer ranks were introduced in the Red Army and served as commander of the Odessa Military District from 1940 to 1941. He was promoted to colonel-general in February 1941.

=== World War II ===
Cherevichenko was the commanding officer of the 9th Army from June to September 1941 and the 2nd Army from 29 September to 4 October 1941. He assumed command of the Southern Front (Army Group) from Lieutenant-General Dmitry Ryabyshev on 5 October 1941.

With the majority of Ukraine already in German hands by October 1941, Kleist's Panzers advanced across the Mius River to Russia's Rostov Oblast and had occupied the city of Taganrog by November 4, preparing to move further for an attack on Rostov. Cherevichenko and the Army's commander for the Southwestern Direction, Marshal Semyon Timoshenko, prepared to attempt a counterattack. Timoshenko later shifted two rifle divisions and a tank brigade from the Southwestern Front to prepare a Southern Front reserve and settled on a plan worked out with his chief of staff, Major-General Alexey Antonov, and Stavka also provided the 37th Army to reinforce the operation on Timoshenko's request.

Though preferring to delay the counterattack because of the delays needed in assembling some of his units, Cherevichenko was pressed to commence the operation by Stavka and had the attack begin on November 17 with just four rifle divisions and one tank brigade, but only one day late. Though able to capture Rostov, Kleist's Panzer Army was caught by surprise in the counterattack and was compelled to abandon the city by the end of the month. On November 30, Pravda published a photograph of Cherevichenko alongside Marshal Stalin's praise of the Rostov defenders. On December 2, the German rode their tanks back to the Mius River.

Credited for his successful work at Rostov, Cherevichenko was made commander of the Bryansk Front – formed for the second time from the 3rd Army from the Central Front, the 13th Army from the Southwestern Front, and the 61st Army from the reserve – on 24 December 1941. This Front would take part in the last phase of the Battle of Moscow in conjunction with the adjacent Western Front of Army General Georgy Zhukov and the Kalinin Front of Colonel-General Ivan Konev.

Relieved as commander of the Bryansk Front by Lieutenant-General Filipp Golikov in April 1942, Cherevichenko was made deputy commander of the North Caucasus Front, subordinated to Front Commander Marshal Semyon Budyonny, who had been Cherevichenko's commanding officer in the 1st Cavalry Army in the Civil War. In August 1942, Budyonny named Cherevichenko commander of the Black Sea Group of Forces, whose responsibility included the defense of the port city of Novorossiysk and its Black Sea Fleet naval base, which fell to the Germans in the course of Operation Blue in the fall of 1942.

No longer as esteemed as previously by superior officers in the high command, Cherevichenko was made commander of the 5th Army of the Soviet Western Front in October 1942, replacing Lieutenant-General Ivan Fedyuninsky upon his promotion to deputy commander of the Volkhov Front. Relieved of this command in favor of Lieutenant-General Vitaly Polenov, Cherevichenko was left at the disposal of Stavka without commander's responsibility until April 1943, when he was made an assistant of the commander of the Northern Caucasus Front (Colonel-General Ivan Maslennikov until May, then Colonel-General Ivan Petrov).

Cherevichenko held the position of commanding officer of the Kharkov Military District upon its recreation in September 1943 until January 1944, then served at the disposal of Stavka and the military councils of the 2nd and 1st Belorussian Fronts. He was appointed commanding officer of the 7th Rifle Corps in late April 1945; this unit took part in the Battle of Berlin as part of the 1st Belorussian Front at the close of World War II in Europe.

=== Post-war ===
Cherevichenko was an assistant to the commander for the Tauride Military District from 1948 to 1950.

Cherevichenko retired from the military service in 1950. He died on 4 July 1976.

== Honours and awards ==
Yakov Cherevichenko was awarded:

- two Orders of Lenin (1940, February 21, 1945)
- Order of the October Revolution
- four Orders of the Red Banner (1923, February 22, 1930 November 3, 1944, 1948),
- Order of Kutuzov (1st Class) (July 29, 1944) and 2nd class
- Order of Suvorov (2nd Class) (1945)
- Order of the Red Star
- Medal "For the Defence of Sevastopol"
- Medal "For the Defence of the Caucasus"
- Medal "For the Capture of Berlin"
- Medal "For the Victory over Germany in the Great Patriotic War 1941–1945"
- Jubilee Medal "XX Years of the Workers' and Peasants' Red Army"
- Polish Cross of Grunwald, third class (1946)
- Medal "For the Odra, Nisus, Baltic" (1946).
