= 9th Army (Soviet Union) =

WW2 Soviet Red Army formation

- 9-я армия
- Active: 1939–1943
- Country: Soviet Union
- Branch: Red Army
- Type: Combined arms
- Size: Field army
- Engagements: World War II; Winter War; Battle of Suomussalmi; Eastern Front; Operation Munchen; Battle of Rostov; Second Battle of Kharkiv; Battle of the Caucasus

Commanders
- Notable commanders: Vasily Chuikov; Ivan Boldin; Yakov Cherevichenko; Anton Lopatin; Konstantin Koroteev; Vasily Glagolev

The 9th Army (Russian: 9-я армия) of the Soviet Union's Red Army was a Soviet field army, active from 1939 to 1943.

== History ==
=== First formation ===
It was active during the Winter War against Finland as part of the Leningrad Military District, beginning operations at the end of November 1939 under KomKor M.P. Duhanov with the 49th and Special Rifle Corps as well as assigned aviation units. 9th Army was initially tasked with the capture of Kajaani and Oulu. Two divisions attached to the army, the 44th and 163rd Rifle Divisions, were defeated by the Finns during the Battle of Suomussalmi. It appears to have been disbanded after the end of the war.

=== Second formation ===
In 1940 the Army was created to take part in the Soviet occupation of Bessarabia and Northern Bukovina. It was disbanded on 10 July 1940.

=== Third formation ===
By 1941 the Army was designated the 9th Separate Army (briefly) and included the 14th, 35th and 48th Rifle Corps (the last under then General Major Rodion Malinovsky), 2nd Cavalry Corps, 2nd and 18th Mechanised Corps, 80th, 81st, 82nd, 84th, 86th Fortified Regions and a number of other units – the biggest army on the Soviet border before the German Operation Barbarossa began. However, it was more an administrative than an operational formation on 22 June 1941. With General Major M.V. Zakharov as chief of staff, it was tasked to cover the Bălți, Chisinau, and Odesa approaches as part of General Ivan Tyulenev's Southern Front.

The first engagement came when Von Schobert's Eleventh Army crashed into the juncture of 9th and 18th Armies. North of Jassy, the German assault fell on the 48th Rifle Corps which was covering Bălți. Tyulenev ordered a counterattack, and soon 48th Rifle and 2nd Cavalry Corps plus 2nd Mechanised Corps from Southern Front reserve were engaged at Bălți and Stefanesti. Tyulenev then drew off 25th, 51st, and 150th Rifle Divisions from two of Zakharov's rifle corps to form a new 'Coastal Group' to cover the eastern bank of the Prut River, the northern bank of the Danube and the Black Sea coast. (This group later became the Separate Coastal Army).

By early August, 9th Army was falling back to Mykolaiv under repeated German blows, and by 17 August across the River Ingulets and over to the eastern bank of the Dnieper. The 'Coastal Group' was meanwhile falling back on Odesa. By early 9 October Army was falling back on Taganrog, after a failed attempt by Southern Front's three armies to hold a line between Pavlograd and the Sea of Azov had been shattered by an outflanking maneuver by Von Kleist's newly renamed First Panzer Army. The resulting Battle of the Sea of Azov shattered 9th Army, virtually destroying it.

The Soviets' next move was a planned offensive orchestrated by Timoshenko, GlavKom Southwest. After still more retreats and the loss of Rostov, 9th Army stepped off on 17 November as part of an assault by both Southern and Southwestern Fronts, and by 29 November, 9th Army in conjunction with 56th Army and other units had cleared Rostov and the city was back in Soviet hands. 9th Army then joined Timoshenko's strategic reserve, to join the battle again when the Barvenkovo–Lozovaya Offensive operation began. 9th Army joined this assault in January 1942 when it broke into the German front on the northern Donets along with 6th and 57th Armies, reaching the line Balakleya-Lozovaia-Slavyansk before being halted by repeated German counterattacks.

Still with Southern Front, 9th Army was then allotted a subsidiary part in the Kharkov offensive – the Second Battle of Kharkiv – which kicked off in May 1942. Along with 57th Army, 9th Army was tasked to secure the southern part of the Izyum bulge in the front. While being in a secondary sector, 9th Army took much of the force of the German response, Operation Fridericus. Eight hours into the German counterstroke, at noon on 17 May, elements of the First Panzer and Seventeenth Armies were ten miles into 9th Army's positions and threatening the neighbouring 57th Army's rear. Commander, Southern Front, General Lieutenant R. Ya. Malinovskii, at once drew 5th Cavalry Corps, a rifle division, and a tank brigade out of reserve in an attempt to halt Von Kleist. However discussions and decisions at Stavka about breaking off the Kharkov offensive in response did not come quickly enough, and 6th and 57th Armies were surrounded in the Izyum pocket with the loss of 200,000 plus men in casualties alone.

Later, as part of the North Caucasian and Transcaucasian Fronts, the Army fought on the big bend of the river Don (in the summer of 1942), and participated in the Battle of the Caucasus.

In November 1943 the army headquarters was disbanded, and its formations and units transferred to other armies.

== Commanders ==
- Komkor Mikhail Dukhanov (21 November – 22 December 1939)
- Komkor Vasily Chuikov (22 December 1939 – 5 April 1940)
- Lieutenant General Ivan Boldin (20 June – 10 July 1940)
- Colonel General Yakov Cherevichenko (22 June – 9 September 1941)
- Major General Fyodor Kharitonov (9 September 1941 – 20 May 1942)
- Major General Pyotr Kozlov (20 May – 18 June 1942)
- Major General Dmitry Nikishov (18–24 June 1942)
- Lieutenant General Anton Lopatin (24 June – 17 July 1942)
- Major General Feofan Parkhomenko (14 July – 7 August 1942)
- Major General Vladimir Marcinkiewicz (8–28 August 1942)
- Major General (Lieutenant General April 1943) Konstantin Koroteev (September 1942 – February 1943)
- Major General Vasily Glagolev (11 February – 22 March 1943)
- Lieutenant General Konstantin Koroteev (March–May 1943)
- Major General (Lieutenant General October 1943) Aleksei Grechkin (June–November 1943)

== Order of Battle, 22 June 1941 ==
Note: This order of battle disagrees in the matter of the 150th Rifle Division with material from David Glantz, Stumbling Colossus

- 14th Rifle Corps (Major General D. G. Yegerov)
  - 25th Rifle Division
  - 51st Rifle Division
- 35th Rifle Corps (Kombrig I. F. Daschitschev)
  - 95th Rifle Division
  - 176th Rifle Division
- 48th Rifle Corps (Major General Rodion Malinovsky)
  - 30th Mountain Rifle Division
  - 74th Rifle Division
  - 150th Rifle Division
- 2nd Cavalry Corps (Major General P. A. Belov)
  - 5th Cavalry Division
  - 9th Cavalry Division
- 2nd Mechanized Corps (Major General Ya. V. Novosetski)
  - 11th Tank Division
  - 16th Tank Division
  - 15th Motorized Division
- 18th Mechanized Corps (Major General P. V. Voloch)
  - 44th Tank Division
  - 47th Tank Division
  - 218th Motorized Division

== 1 July 1942 (Southwest Front) ==
- 51st, 81st, 106th, 140th, 255th, 296th, 318th, 333rd Rifle Divisions
- 5th Cavalry Corps (30th, 34th, 60th Cavalry Divisions)
- 12th Tank Brigade

== 1 February 1943 (North Caucasus Front) ==
- 9th Rifle Corps (43rd, 157th, 256th Rifle Brigades)
- 11th Guards Rifle Corps (7th, 34th, 57th. Rifle Brigades, 8. Guards Rifle Brigade)
- 11th Rifle Corps (19th, 84th, 131st Rifle Brigades)
- 207th Tank Brigade

== 1 July 1943 (North Caucasus Front) ==
- 9th Rifle Corps (34th, 43rd, 157th, 256th Rifle Brigades)
- 11th Rifle Corps (19th, 57th, 84th, 131st Rifle Brigades)
- 276th, 351st Rifle Divisions

== Sources ==
- Robert Kirchubel: Unternehmen Barbarossa, Oxford 2003.
- from http://samsv.narod.ru/Arm/a09/arm.html:
  - Grechko A., " fight for Caucasus ", 2 изд., Moscow, 1973
  - Oreshkin A., " Defensive operation of 9-th army (October – November 1941) ", Moscow, 1960
- Administrative Order of Battle, 9th Army, 22 June 1941
