= Novosyolovka =

Novosyolovka Новосёловка
- Khutor
- Location within Belgorod Oblast Location within Russia
- Coordinates: 50°27′N 38°51′E
- Country: Russia
- Region: Belgorod Oblast
- District: Alexeyevsky District
- Time zone: UTC+3:00

Novosyolovka (Russian: Новосёловка) is a rural locality (a khutor) in Alexeyevsky District, Belgorod Oblast, Russia. The population was 42 as of 2010. There is 1 street.

== Geography ==
Novosyolovka is located 31 km southeast of Alexeyevka (the district's administrative centre) by road. Aleynikovo is the nearest rural locality.
