= Defensive zone =

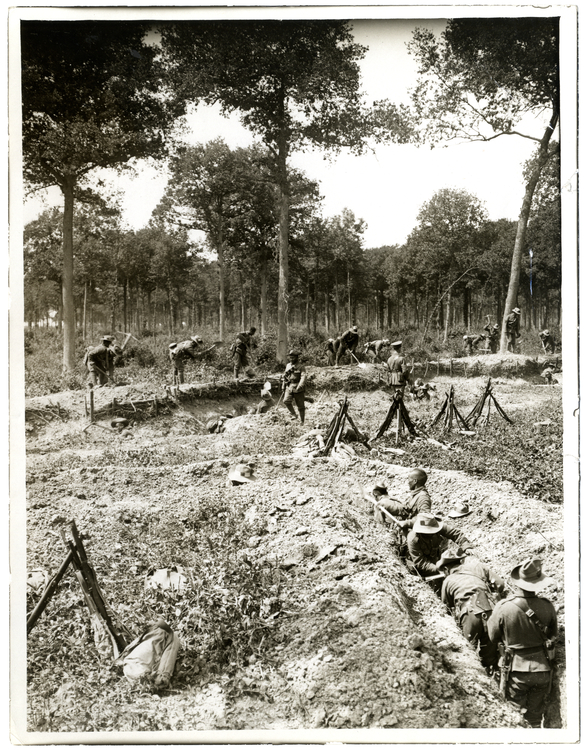
The Gurkha divisions are preparing defensive positions, July 1915

A defensive zone is a previously prepared area of terrain allocated for defense to a military formation, where its forces and means are located, a fire system is organized, engineering barriers and fortifications are erected.

The defensive zone from the front is limited by the front line, from the flanks – by demarcation lines with neighboring units, and from the rear – by the depth of the battle formation or operational formation of the troops involved. The spatial dimensions of the defense zone are determined by the combat capabilities of the military formation protecting it.

As a rule, when conducting positional defense, the defense zone is set up in order to consolidate on important lines and repel offensive actions of the enemy. When using tactics of maneuverable defense, it serves to defeat the enemy by arranging fire bags and consistently holding a number of lines echeloned in depth.

== Sources ==
- Korolev Yu. (1977). "Engineering Equipment of the Division's Defense Zone" (Magazine) (9) (Foreign Military Review ed.): 29–34.
