= Battle of Rostov (1941) =

1941 battle on the Eastern Front of World War II

- Part of the Eastern Front of World War II
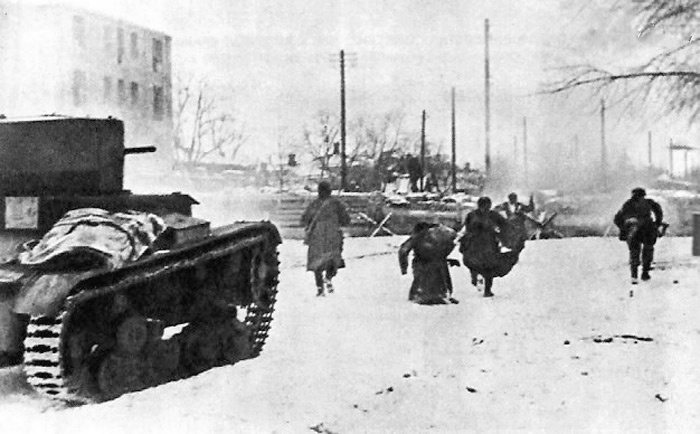
- Soviet troops fighting in Rostov
Date	17 November–2 December 1941 (2 weeks and 1 day)
Location	Rostov-on-Don region, USSR
Result	Soviet victory

Belligerents
Soviet Union	Germany; Romania; Slovakia

Commanders and leaders
(Soviet Union) Yakov Cherevichenko (Soviet Union) Anton Lopatin	(Nazi Germany) Gerd von Rundstedt (Nazi Germany) Walther von Reichenau (Nazi Germany) Ewald von Kleist (Russia) Jozef Turanec

Strength
(Soviet Union) Southern Front: 37th Army	(Nazi Germany) Army Group South: 1st Panzer Army; 17th Army

Casualties and losses
33,000 (17 November–2 December) (including 27,000 combat casualties)	Per German medical data only (incomplete data and excluding non-combat casualties): 1,141 killed 5,118 wounded 251 missing Total: 6,510 (11 November–30 November)

The eastern front at the time of the Battle of Rostov.

The Battle of Rostov (1941) took place on the Eastern Front of World War II around Rostov-on-Don and was fought between Army Group South of Nazi Germany and the Southern Front of the Soviet Union.

The battle comprised three phases: the German Sea of Azov Offensive Operation by Army Group South (General Gerd von Rundstedt) (begun on 12 September 1941), the Soviet Rostov Defensive Operation (5 November 1941 – 16 November 1941) by the Southern Front (General Yakov Timofeyevich Cherevichenko), and the Rostov Offensive Operation (27 November 1941 – 2 December 1941) executed by the same Soviet Front.

After forcing their way across the Mius River on 17 November, the German forces captured 10,000 Soviet troops and took Rostov on 21 November. Six days later the Southern Front, reinforced with the newly raised 37th Army, counterattacked from the north and threatened to surround the overstretched German III Motorized Army Corps. Rundstedt then ordered a retreat to the Mius line from Rostov to prevent the encirclement. The Red Army retook Rostov on 28 November. It was the first successful major Soviet counteroffensive of the war. Hitler fired von Rundstedt on 1 December. Rundstedt's successor Walther von Reichenau confirmed the retreat order with the backing of the Army High Command Chief of Staff Franz Halder and Hitler relented (details here).

== Prelude ==
After concluding the Battle of Kiev in September 1941, the German Army Group South advanced from the Dniepr River to the Sea of Azov coast. Walther von Reichenau's 6th Army captured Kharkov in the First Battle of Kharkov. Carl-Heinrich von Stülpnagel's 17th Army advanced through Poltava towards Voroshilovgrad. Erich von Manstein's 11th Army moved into the Crimean Peninsula and took control of all of the peninsula by autumn (except Sevastopol, which held out until 3 July 1942).

Ewald von Kleist's 1st Panzer Army advanced from Kiev, and encircled Soviet troops at Melitopol in October, then attacked east along the shore of the Sea of Azov toward Rostov at the mouth of the Don River, known as the gateway to the Caucasus.

== Sea of Azov Offensive Operation ==
Rostov was assigned as the objective for the 11th Army now commanded by General Eugen Ritter von Schobert, however he died in a crash on the same day after landing his liaison aircraft in a minefield. To replace him, Manstein was ordered to travel from the Leningrad sector of the front to the extreme southern sector. He would also receive support from the 4th Luftwaffe Air Fleet.

At this time the LIVth Army Corps of the 11th Army was still engaged in Crimea, and because the Romanian forces were still engaged in the Siege of Odessa, the Army's resources for the Rostov objective were severely limited even against retreating Red Army troops. Therefore, Manstein initially replaced the LIV Corps with the smaller XXXth Army Corps and XLIXth Mountain Corps and ordered the LIV Corps into the first echelon in the advance to Rostov.

Late in September, the Romanian 3rd Army joined the 11th Army in its advance towards Rostov, but was severely depleted by the attacks of the Soviet 9th and 18th Armies on 26 September. This forced a halt to the Army's advance to safeguard its flank and forced Manstein to use his only mobile reserve unit, the Leibstandarte Brigade to shore up Romanian defenses.

== Rostov Defensive Operation ==
The Soviet counter-attack delivered as part of the general Donbas–Rostov strategic defensive operation (29 September 1941 – 16 November 1941) also forced Rundstedt's Army Group South to order his 1st Panzer Army to manoeuvre in order to be better placed to counter any further Soviet thrusts in the Romanian sector of the front, and also to attempt an encirclement of the two Soviet Armies, which was partly successful in the area of Chernigovka where on 8 October the commander of the 18th Soviet Army, General-Lieutenant A.K. Smirnov, was killed by artillery fire on his command post in the village of Popovka during the breakout attempt between 5 and 10 October 1941. This was interpreted by Hitler as such a success that he declared "The battle of the Sea of Azov is over" on 11 October before the troops had even reached their objective. As a commemorative gesture, Hitler issued the order to redesignate the Leibstandarte Brigade as SS Division Leibstandarte.

The German 11th Army was ordered back to Crimea to effect the breakthrough of the Isthmus of Perekop.

Perceiving that the way to Rostov and the Caucasus was open, Hitler issued an order transferring the objective from the 11th Army to the 1st Panzer Army and attaching to it the ill-prepared Romanian 3rd Army, the Italian Alpine Corps, and the Slovakian Motorised Brigade.

During the subsequent reorganisation of Axis forces the III Panzer Corps and XIV Panzer Corps took the lead, supported by the XLIX Mountain Corps recently arrived from Crimea.

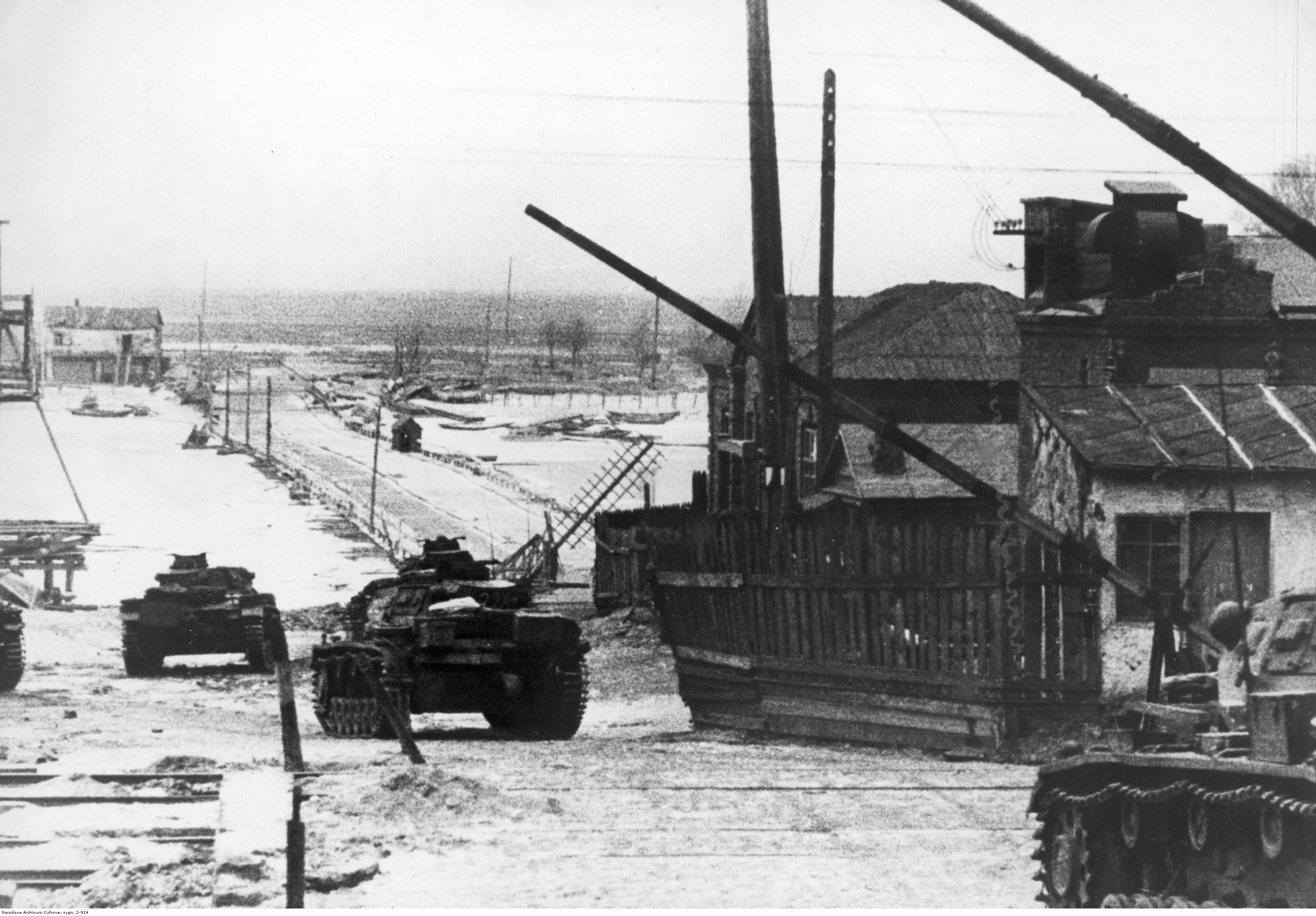
Column of German Panzer III tanks in Rostov, November 1941.

By 17 October 1941 the Mius River was crossed by the 14th Panzer Division and Taganrog was captured by German troops, with the mountain troops entering Stalino, forcing the newly formed 12th Army into a renewed withdrawal. However, the autumn rains had begun, and the Rasputitsa ("roadlessness") had set in slowing the 1st Panzer Army's advance to "meter by meter". This meant that the leading German units did not reach the outskirts of Rostov until mid-November, having lost contact with the Red Army in the meantime.

The assault on Rostov began on 17 November, and on 21 November the Germans took the city. However, the German lines were over-extended, and Kleist's warnings that his left flank was vulnerable and that his tanks were ineffective in the freezing weather were ignored.

== Rostov Offensive Operation ==
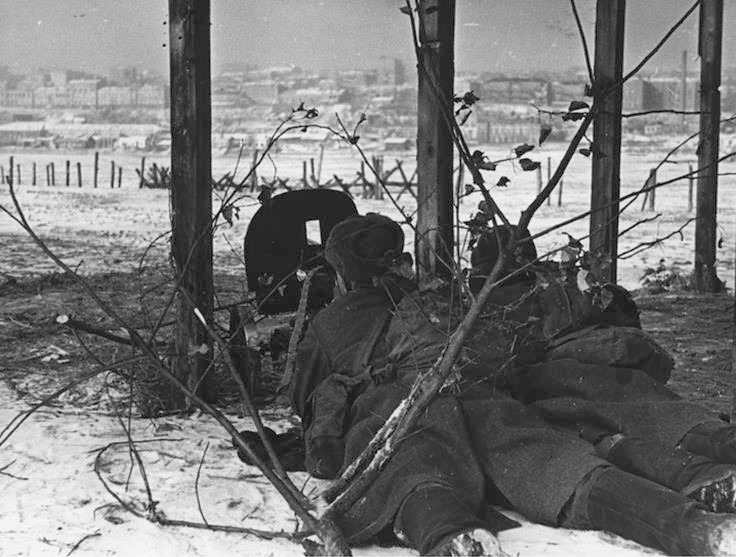
A Soviet Maxim machine gun crew driving Germans from the outskirts of the city, November 1941

On 27 November the 37th Army, commanded by Lieutenant-General Anton Ivanovich Lopatin, as part of the Rostov Strategic Offensive Operation (17 November 1941 – 2 December 1941), counter-attacked the 1st Panzer Army's spearhead from the north, forcing them to pull out of the city. Adolf Hitler countermanded the retreat. When Rundstedt refused to obey, Hitler sacked him, and replaced him with Reichenau. However, Reichenau saw at once that Rundstedt was right and succeeded in persuading Hitler, via Franz Halder, to authorise the withdrawal, and the 1st Panzer Army was forced back to the Mius River at Taganrog. It was the first significant German withdrawal of the war.

== See also ==
- Battle of Rostov (1942) – the German 17th Army captured the city.
- Battle of Rostov (1943) – the Soviet Union recaptured the city.

== Sources ==
- Haupt, Werner, Army Group South: The Wehrmacht in Russia 1941–1945, Schiffer Publishing, Atglen, 1998
