= Soviet Military Encyclopedia =

Soviet encyclopedia of military strategy, tactics, formations, history and equipment

- Editors: Andrei Grechko (Volumes 1 and 8); Nikolai Ogarkov (Volumes 2–7)
- Original title: Советская военная энциклопедия
- Language: Russian
- Subject: Military art and science
- Publisher: Voenizdat
- Publication date: 1976–1980
- Publication place: Soviet Union
- Media type: Print
- OCLC: 8109684

The Soviet Military Encyclopedia (Russian: Советская военная энциклопедия (СВЭ), romanized: Sovetskaya voyennaya entsiklopediya (SVE)) is an eight-volume encyclopedic dictionary of military subjects. It was published by Voenizdat, the publishing house of the Soviet Ministry of Defense, between 1976 and 1980.

== Background ==
In the early 1930s, an attempt at publishing a projected twelve-volume Soviet Military Encyclopedia was made under the direction of Robert Eideman, the head of the Frunze Military Academy. However, only the first two volumes were published by the People's Commissariat of Defense in 1932 and 1933, due to the execution of Eideman and many of the editorial board during the Great Purge.

Due to revolutions in military affairs in the second half of the 20th century, the Soviet Ministry of Defense decided to publish an encyclopedia to summarize developments.

== Editions and translations ==
Beginning in 1976, the eight volumes of the encyclopedia were published by Voenizdat, the publishing house of the Soviet Ministry of Defense. 106,000 copies were printed.

After the publication of the initial eight volumes, two smaller editions of the Military Encyclopedic Dictionary (Russian: Военного энциклопедического словаря) were published in 1983 and 1986 based on the content of the Soviet Military Encyclopedia. The first volume of the second edition, under the general editorship of then-Chief of the General Staff Mikhail Moiseyev, was published by Voenizdat in 1990. The second edition was not completed due to the dissolution of the Soviet Union.

The Russian Ministry of Defense published the successor Military Encyclopedia in Eight Volumes (Russian: Военная энциклопедия в 8 томах) beginning in 1994, including articles on subjects excluded by the Soviet version for ideological reasons, such as those relating to the White movement.

An abridged four-volume English translation of the encyclopedia was published by Westview Press in 1993, edited and translated by William C. Green and W. Robert Reeves.

== Content ==
The encyclopedia contains around 11,000 articles on military theory, military history, military technology, and military geography, as well as biographical articles. The eight volumes of the encyclopedia are illustrated with more than 5,500 maps, diagrams, and photographs.

According to then-Chief of the General Staff Mikhail Kolesnikov, writing in the journal Voyennaya Mysl (Military Thought), the encyclopedia's articles are mostly objective and reliable, but it devotes much of its space to promoting Soviet ideology, making the encyclopedia "excessively politicized". As a result, it is "not without subjectivity in assessing the role and significance of certain military operations and military and political figures", reducing the "objectivity and scientific value of the articles".

== Authors ==
The Soviet Ministry of Defense supervised the writing of the encyclopedia, with contributions from prominent Soviet military leaders and military scientists. Then-Minister of Defense Andrei Grechko chaired the Main Editorial Commission of the encyclopedia for volumes one and eight, and then-Chief of the General Staff Nikolai Ogarkov took over the position after Grechko's death in 1976. The rest of the editorial commission for the first volume included:

- Colonel General of Engineers Nikolay Alekseyev
- Colonel General Alexander Altunin
- Admiral of the Fleet Sergey Gorshkov
- Nikolay Gribachyov
- Army General Alexei Yepishev (deputy chairman)
- Corresponding member of the Soviet Academy of Sciences Lieutenant General Pavel Zhilin (deputy chairman)
- Professor Igor Zemskov
- Professor Army General Semyon Ivanov
- Corresponding member of the Soviet Academy of Sciences Mikhail Iovchuk
- Professor Major General Mikhail Kiryan
- Professor S.M. Kovalyov
- Chief marshal of Aviation Pavel Kutakhov
- Army General Nikolai Ogarkov (deputy chairman)
- Army General Ivan Pavlovsky
- Professor A.D. Pedosov (deputy chairman)
- Colonel General Gennady Svedin
- Army General Ivan Shavrov
- Army General Ivan Shkadov
