= Ivan Tyulenev =

Soviet union military commander

Ivan Vladimirovich Tyulenev Ива́н Влади́мирович Тюле́нев
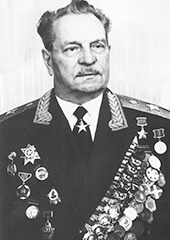
- Born: 28 January 1892; Shatrashany, Simbirsk Governorate, Russian Empire
- Died: 15 August 1978 (aged 86); Moscow, Soviet Union
- Military career
- Allegiance: Russian Empire (1913–1917); Soviet Russia (1917–1922); Soviet Union (1922–1958)
- Branch: (Russian Empire) Imperial Russian Army; Red Army
- Service years: 1913–1958
- Rank: General of the Army (USSR)
- Commands: 12th Army; Southern Front; 28th Army; Transcaucasian Military District; Transcaucasian Front.
- Conflicts: World War I Russian Civil War; Polish–Soviet War; World War II
- Awards: Hero of the Soviet Union; Order of St George; Order of Lenin (4 times); Order of the October Revolution; Order of the Red Banner (5 times); Order of Kutuzov (1st Class); Order for Service to the Homeland in the Armed Forces of the USSR

Ivan Vladimirovich Tyulenev (Russian: Ива́н Влади́мирович Тюле́нев; 28 January 1892 – 15 August 1978) was a Soviet military commander, one of the first to be promoted to the rank of General of the Army in 1940.

== Biography ==
Tyulenvev was born into a soldier's family in the Simbirsk Governorate (now Ulyanovsk Oblast) settlement of Shatrashany. He worked in factories and as a Caspian Sea fisherman before being drafted into the Imperial Russian Army in 1913. During World War I he fought with the Kargopolsky dragoons in Congress Poland and was awarded the Order of St George for his courage.

Tyulenvev joined the Red Army after the revolution and served during the Russian Civil War with the 1st Cavalry Army. In 1918 he joined the Bolshevik Party. He also took part in suppressing the Kronstadt rebellion and in the Polish Soviet War. In 1939 he commanded the 12th Army during the Soviet invasion of Poland. He was promoted to General of the Army in 1940.

At the outbreak of the German-Soviet War in June 1941, he was in charge of the Moscow Military District. In the first three months of the war, Tyulenev commanded the Southern Front. During the rest of the war, he was in command of the Transcaucasian Military District and Transcaucasian Front. Tyulenev was the author of several books of reminiscences, including Soviet Cavalry Fighting for the Fatherland (1957) and Through Three Wars (1972).

== Honours and awards ==
Russian Empire

- Medal of St. George, 4th class (Order of the 5th Regiment of the Kargopol, 3 August 1915; No. 118, § 1)
- Cross of St. George, 3rd class (Order of the 5th Regiment of the Kargopol, 10 November 1915; No. 156, § 3), 2nd class (Order of the 5th Regiment of the Kargopol, 26 June 1916; No. 119 + § 6), 4th class (Order of the 5th Regiment of the Kargopol,9 July 1916; No. 126 + § 6), 1st class (Order of the 5th Regiment of the Kargopol, 5 February 1917; No. 20 + § 6)

Soviet Union

- "Gold Star" Medal Hero of the Soviet Union No. 11295
- Four Orders of Lenin (1941, 1945, 1962, 1978)
- Order of the October Revolution (1972)
- Order of the Red Banner, five times (1921, 1921, 1930, 1944, 1947)
- Order of Kutuzov, 1st class (28 January 1943)
- Order for Service to the Homeland in the Armed Forces of the USSR, 3rd class (1975)
- Jubilee Medal "XX Years of the Workers' and Peasants' Red Army"
- Medal "For the Defence of Odessa"
- Medal "For the Defence of the Caucasus"
- Medal "For the Victory over Germany in the Great Patriotic War 1941–1945"
- Medal "In Commemoration of the 800th Anniversary of Moscow"
- Jubilee Medal "30 Years of the Soviet Army and Navy"
- Jubilee Medal "40 Years of the Armed Forces of the USSR"
- Jubilee Medal "Twenty Years of Victory in the Great Patriotic War 1941-1945"
- Jubilee Medal "Thirty Years of Victory in the Great Patriotic War 1941-1945"
- Jubilee Medal "50 Years of the Armed Forces of the USSR"
- Jubilee Medal "60 Years of the Armed Forces of the USSR"
- Medal "Veteran of the Armed Forces of the USSR"
- Breastplate of the "25 Years of Victory in Great Patriotic War"
- Jubilee Medal "In Commemoration of the 100th Anniversary since the Birth of Vladimir Il'ich Lenin"
- Honorary weapon with a gold image of the State Emblem of the USSR

Foreign awards

- Order of the Red Banner (Mongolia)
- Order "25 years of Ethiopia" (Ethiopia)
- Order "25 years of victory over fascism" (Belgium)
- Medal "30 Years of Victory in the Halkin-Gol" (Mongolia)
- Medal "50 Years of the Mongolian People's Revolution" (Mongolia)
- Medal "The Sino-Soviet friendship" (China)
- Antifascist medal (East Germany)
- Medal "For the strengthening of friendship in arms," 1st class (Czechoslovakia)
- Medal "Garibaldi" (Italy)
- Medal "50 Years of the Mongolian People's Army" (Mongolia)
- Gold Medal "for the strengthening of friendship in arms" (Czechoslovakia)
