= Jubilee Medal "XX Years of the Workers' and Peasants' Red Army" =

Commemorative medal of the Soviet Union

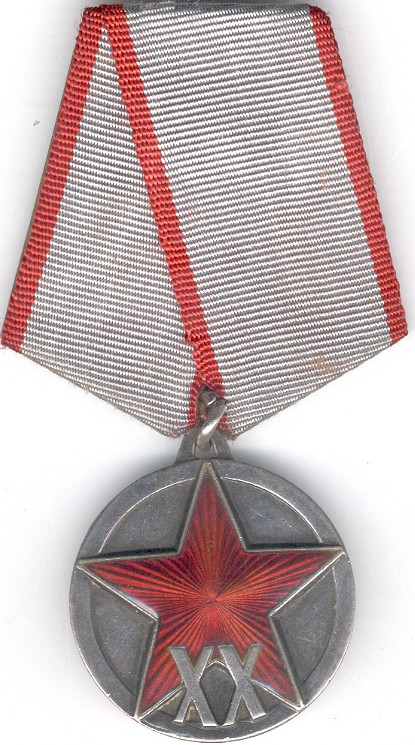
- Jubilee Medal "XX Years of the Workers' and Peasants' Red Army" (obverse)
- Type: Jubilee medal
- Awarded for: Civil war service and 20 years service
- Presented by: USSR
- Eligibility: Citizens of the Soviet Union
- Status: No longer awarded
- Established: January 24, 1938

Highlights
- Total: 37,504
- Ribbon of the Jubilee Medal "XX Years of the Workers' and Peasants' Red Army"

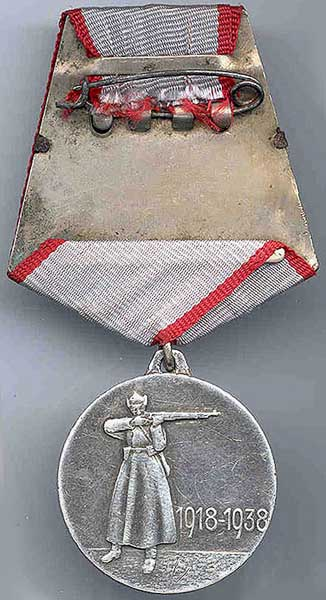
Reverse of the Jubilee Medal "XX Years of the Workers' and Peasants' Red Army"

The Jubilee Medal "XX Years of the Workers' and Peasants' Red Army" (Russian: Юбилейная медаль «XX лет Рабоче-Крестьянской Красной Армии») was a state military commemorative medal of the Soviet Union established on January 24, 1938 by decree of the Presidium of the Supreme Soviet of the USSR to denote the twentieth anniversary of the creation of the Soviet Armed Forces.

== Medal Statute ==
The Jubilee Medal "XX Years of the Workers' and Peasants' Red Army" was awarded to staff and commanding officers of the Workers' and Peasants' Red Army and Navy who had, as of February 23, 1938 (the Day of the Red Army), served for 20 years in its ranks, and to those honoured during the Civil War and the war for freedom and independence of the motherland in units of the Workers' and Peasants' Red Army and Navy; to those awarded the Order of the Red Banner for distinguished service during the Civil War.

The time served in the units and detachments of the Red Guards and the Red guerrilla groups that operated against the enemies of Soviet power between 1917 and 1921 counted towards award of the medal.

The Jubilee Medal "XX Years of the Workers' and Peasants' Red Army" was worn on the left side of the chest and when in the presence of other medals of the USSR, it was located immediately after the Medal "For Tapping of the Subsoil and Expansion of the Petrochemical Complex of Western Siberia".

== Medal description ==
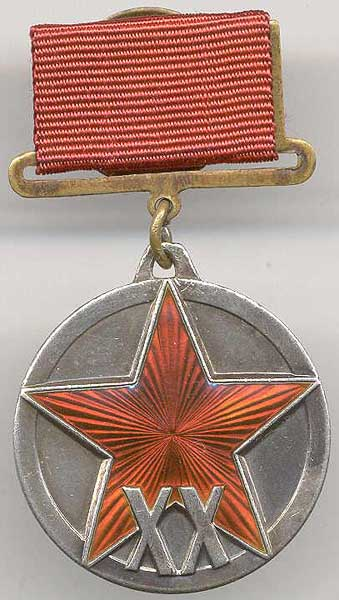
Original variant 1938 to 1943 of the Jubilee Medal "XX Years of the Workers' and Peasants' Red Army"

The Jubilee Medal "XX Years of the Workers' and Peasants' Red Army" is a 32 mm in diameter oxidised silver matte finished circular medal with a polished 2.5 mm rim. On the obverse, a large red enamelled five pointed star with a silvered edge, the tip of each point reaching the medal's edge; at the bottom sitting on the rim, in deep relief, the prominent 8 mm high gilded Roman numeral "XX" going up between the star's lower rays to superimpose it over 4 mm.

On the reverse, a 25 mm high relief image of a Red Army soldier clad in the winter uniform of the Red Guard and firing a rifle, at the lower right side of the soldier, the dates "1918-1938".

From its establishment in 1938 to 1943, the medal was secured by a ring through the medal suspension loop to a small rectangular mount covered by a red silk moiré ribbon. In 1943, this changed to the now standard Soviet pentagonal mount, now covered by a 24 mm wide silk moiré grey ribbon with a 2 mm red edge stripe on each side.

== Recipients (partial list) ==
From January 1938 to the end of December 1940, 32,127 people received the medal.

All individuals listed below are recipients of the Jubilee Medal "XX Years of the Workers' and Peasants' Red Army".

- General Secretary of the Central Committee of the All-Union Communist Party (Bolsheviks) Joseph Vissarionovich Stalin
- Marshal of the Soviet Union and Defence Minister Kliment Yefremovich Voroshilov
- Admiral of the Fleet Nikolay Gerasimovich Kuznetsov
- Marshal of the Soviet Union Alexander Ilyich Yegorov
- Marshal of the Soviet Union Andrey Ivanovich Yeryomenko
- Colonel General Yakov Timofeyevich Cherevichenko
- Admiral Lev Mikhailovich Galler
- Major General Vladimir Vasilevich Kirpichnikov
- Marshal of Aviation Fedor Yakovlevich Falaleyev
- Colonel General Valerian Alexandrovich Frolov
- Lieutenant General Nikolai Pavlovich Simoniak
- Lieutenant General Nikolai Nikolaevich Vashugin
- Marshal of the Soviet Union Georgy Konstantinovich Zhukov
- Marshal of the Soviet Union Semyon Konstantinovich Timoshenko
- Marshal of the Soviet Union Vasily Ivanovich Chuikov
- Marshal of the Soviet Union Semyon Mikhailovich Budyonny
- Marshal of the Soviet Union Vasily Konstantinovich Blyukher
- Marshal of the Soviet Union Boris Mikhailovitch Shaposhnikov
- Marshal of the Soviet Union Aleksandr Vasilevsky
- Marshal of the Soviet Union Ivan Stepanovich Konev
- Marshal of the Soviet Union Leonid Aleksandrovich Govorov
- Marshal of the Soviet Union Konstantin Konstantinovich Rokossovskiy
- Marshal of the Soviet Union Rodion Yakovlevich Malinovsky
- Marshal of the Soviet Union Fyodor Ivanovich Tolbukhin
- Marshal of the Soviet Union Kirill Afanasievich Meretskov
- Marshal of the Soviet Union Vasily Danilovich Sokolovsky
- Marshal of the Soviet Union Andrei Antonovich Grechko
- Marshal of the Soviet Union Andrey Ivanovich Yeryomenko
- Marshal of the Soviet Union Kirill Semyonovich Moskalenko
- Marshal of the Soviet Union Matvei Vasilevich Zakharov
- Marshal of the Signal Troops Ivan Peresypkin
- Admiral Arseniy Grigoriyevich Golovko
- Admiral Vladimir Filippovich Tributs
- Admiral Gordey Ivanovich Levchenko
- Admiral Filipp Sergeyevich Oktyabrskiy
- Army General Ivan Yefimovich Petrov
- Major General Ivan Vasilyevich Panfilov
- Lieutenant General Ivan Vasilyevich Panfilov
- Marshal of the Soviet Union Pavel Fyodorovich Batitsky
- Army General Ivan Vladimirovich Tyulenev
- Rear Admiral Ivan Dmitrievich Papanin

== See also ==
- Russian Civil War
- Red Army
- Awards and decorations of the Russian Federation
- Awards and decorations of the Soviet Union
