= Hapry =

Rural locality in Myasnikovsky District, Rostov Oblast, Russia

Coordinates: 47.270°N 39.441°E

Hapry (Russian: Хапры) or Khapry is a hamlet in Myasnikovsky District of Rostov Oblast, Russia.

== Geography ==
Located in the center of the district, 2 km south-west of the regional center of Chaltyr, on the right bank of the Dead Donets river, 23 m above sea level.

On the southern outskirts of the farm passes the railway line Rostov-Main - Taganrog-II, in the same place the nearest station is the Safyanovo platform.

Neighboring settlements: Nedvigovka farm 4 km to the west and Wet Chaltyr 1 km to the east.

== History ==
In 1929, Kh. Kalinin was included in the Myasnikovsky District, and then, in 1933, the Khapersky Village Council was joined with the Nedvigovka, Khapry and M. Chaltyr farms.
