= 18th Army (Soviet Union) =

- 18-я армия
- Active: 1941–1946
- Country: Soviet Union
- Branch: Red Army
- Type: Combined arms
- Size: Field Army; Several corps or, later, divisions
- Part of: Front or Military District
- Engagements: Operation Barbarossa; Moravian-Ostrava Offensive; Operation München; Rostov Defensive Operation; Battle of Rostov (1941); Mius-Front; Kerch–Eltigen Operation; Zhitomir–Berdichev Offensive; Lvov–Sandomierz Offensive; Battle of the Dukla Pass; Prague Offensive

The 18th Army (Russian: 18-я армия) of the Soviet Union's Red Army was formed on 21 June 1941 on the basis of HQ Kharkov Military District and armies of the Kiev Special Military District.

The Army's commander in 1941 was General-Lieutenant Andrey Smirnov. The Army composition on the beginning of the war was:

- 16th Mechanised Corps
  - 15th Tank Division, 39th Tank Division, 240th Motorised Division, 64th Fighter Air Division and 45th Mixed Air Division
- 17th Rifle Corps
  - 96th Mountain Rifle Division, 60th Mountain Rifle Division, 164th Rifle Division
- 18th Mechanised Corps
  - 47th Tank Division, 218th Mechanised Division
- 55th Rifle Corps
  - 130th Rifle Division, 160th Rifle Division, 189th Rifle Division, 4th Independent Tank Brigade

It was caught soon after the start of Operation Barbarossa in 1941 in a huge encirclement south of Kiev along with the 6th Army and 12th Armies. This encirclement was part of the Battle of Uman. A further formation was shattered during the Battle of the Sea of Azov in September–October 1941.

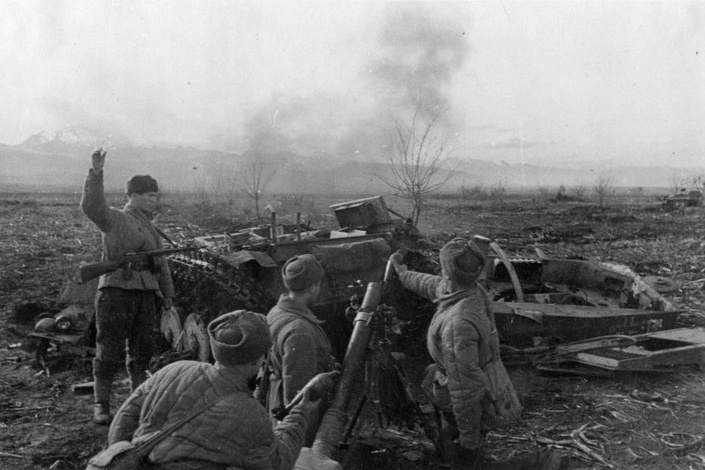
Mortarmen of the 9th Separate Rifle Brigade of the army's 3rd Guards Rifle Corps firing at German positions southeast of Nalchik, November 1942

On 1 October 1943 the army consisted of 20th Rifle Corps (8th Guards Rifle Brigade, 81st and 83rd Naval Rifle Brigades), 55th Guards Rifle Division, 89th Rifle Division, 176th, 318th, 414th Rifle Divisions, 107th Rifle Brigade, 255th Naval Infantry Brigade, 10th Guards Separate Antitank Battalion, artillery, armoured forces, and engineers.

As part of Southern, North-Caucasian, Transcaucasian Front, and the 1st and 4th Ukrainian Fronts the 18th Army conducted defensive operations in right-bank Ukraine, participated in Donbass, the Rostov defensive and offensive operations, and in the fight for Caucasus. Based on the experience of the Kerch - Eltigen landing operation, the Army was uniquely identified as 18th Desant Army (Russian: 18-я десантная армия) for amphibious operations, between 15 February and 5 April 1944 around Malaya Zemlya.

For this operation the Army included:

- 10th Guards Rifle Corps
- 16th Rifle Corps
- 176th Rifle Division
- 318th Rifle Division
- 5th Guards Tank Brigade
- also two artillery regiments of the High Command Reserve, a regiment of Guards mortars (multiple rocket launchers), desant detachment of Major Kunikov, and elements of the 255th and 83rd Naval Infantry Brigades, elements of 107th and 165th Rifle Brigades, 31st Desant Regiment, machine gun battalion and 29th Tank Destroyer Regiment, all under command of Army Operational Group Grechkin (commanding officer General-Major А.А. Grechkin).

The Army reverted to its previous designation for the clearing of right-bank Ukraine, Hungary, Poland and Czechoslovakia. For much of this period the 24th Rifle Division served with 18th Army, and the Division was still serving with the Army in May 1945, along with the 17th Rifle Corps (8th and 138th Rifle Divisions) and a Fortified Region.

After World War II, the 18th Army was transformed into a Mountain Army in the territory of the Carpathian Military District and Northern Bukovina. The 1st Guards Mechanized Division came under the army's control while in Iran from September 1945 to June 1946. This army was disbanded in May 1946. Some of its elements, along with parts of the 52nd Army were used to form the 8th Mechanised Army.

== Commanders ==
- Andrey Smirnov (June - October 1941), Lieutenant General, killed in action
- Vladimir Kolpakchi (October - November 1941), Major General
- Fyodor Kamkov (November 1941 - February 1942 and April - October, 19th 1942), Major General
- Ilya Smirnov (February - April 1942), Lieutenant General
- Andrei Grechko (October 1942 - January, 5th 1943), Major General
- Aleksandr Ryzhov (January - February, 11th 1943), Major General
- Konstantin Koroteyev (February - March, 16th 1943), Major General
- Konstantin Leselidze (March 1943 - on February, 6th 1944), Lieutenant General promoted to Colonel General in October 1943
- Yevgeny Zhuravlev (February - November 1944), Lieutenant General
- Anton Gastilovich (November 1944 - May 1945), Major General, since January 1945 Lieutenant General

== Sources and references ==
- https://samsv.narod.ru/Arm/a18/arm.html
- Feskov et al., The Soviet Army in the Period of Cold War, 2004, Tomsk University Press, Tomsk
- Ukrainian Book of Memory, Vol VIII, http://memory.dag.com.ua/browse?1270
- Victory site https://web.archive.org/web/20160521225208/http://victory.mil.ru/ by the Ministry of Defence of the Russian Federation
