= Mius =

Mius Міус (Ukrainian) Миус (Russian)
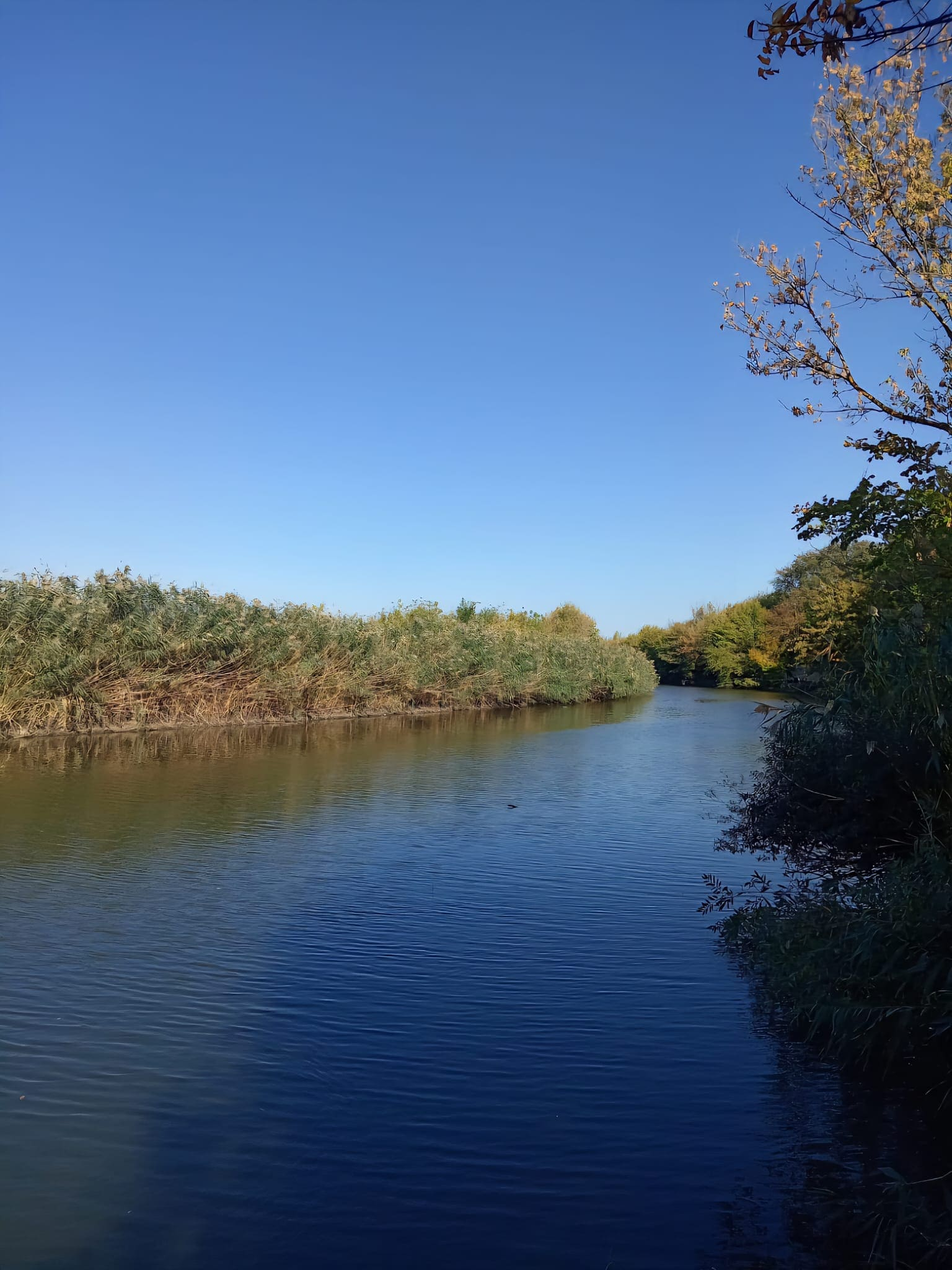

Location
- Country: Ukraine, Russia

Physical characteristics
- Source
  - location: Donetsk Oblast, Ukraine
  - coordinates: 48°16′44″N 38°32′16″E
- Mouth: Sea of Azov
  - location: near Taganrog
  - coordinates: 47.2771°N 38.8093°E
- Length: 258 km (160 mi)
- Basin size: 6,680 km^{2} (2,580 sq mi)

Basin features
- Tributaries
  - right: Krynka

The Mius (Ukrainian: Міус; Russian: Миус) is a river in Eastern Europe that flows through Ukraine and Russia. It is 258 kilometres (160 mi) long, and has a drainage basin of 6,680 square kilometres (2,580 sq mi).

== Course ==
The headwaters of the Mius are in the Donets Mountains, a mountain range within Donetsk Oblast. It flows through Donetsk Oblast and Luhansk Oblast in eastern Ukraine; and then through Rostov Oblast in Russia; and into the Sea of Azov of the northeastern Mediterranean Sea basin.

The river mouth of the Mius is on the Taganrog Bay coast of the Sea of Azov, west of the Russian city of Taganrog.

== History ==
In 1941, during the World War II, the German Nazi General Paul Ludwig Ewald von Kleist created a heavily fortified defensive line known as the Mius-Front along the Mius river. It was an arena of fierce battles during the Rostov Defensive Operation in the 1941−1943 Battle of Rostov campaigns. During the 1943 Donbas Strategic Offensive Soviet troops finally broke through the Mius-Front near the village of Kuybyshevo.

== See also ==
- Drainage basins of the Sea of Azov
