= Voenizdat =

Russian publishing house

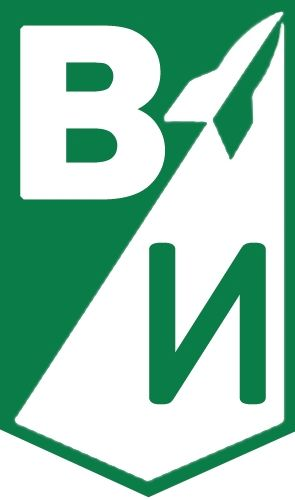
- Founded: 1919
- Defunct: 2012
- Country of origin: USSR
- Headquarters location: Moscow, Russia
- Nonfiction topics: Military science, Memoir, History

Voenizdat (Russian: Воениздат) was a publishing house in Moscow, Russia that was one of the first and largest publishing houses in USSR. The name is a Russian abbreviation for Voennoe Izdatelstvo (Russian: Военное издательство), meaning "Military Publishing House".

Voenizdat was established by the Revolutionary Military Council (Revvoyensoviet) on 25 October 1919. The initial aim was to publish literature for the needs of the Ministry of Defence. It later published both fiction and non-fiction literature, technical manuals and dictionaries. The company was absorbed into the joint stock company Red Star in 2009.
