= 12th Army (Soviet Union) =

Soviet Red Army formation

- 12-я армия
- Active: 1919–1920; 1939–1943
- Country: Soviet Union
- Branch: Red Army
- Type: Combined arms
- Size: Field army

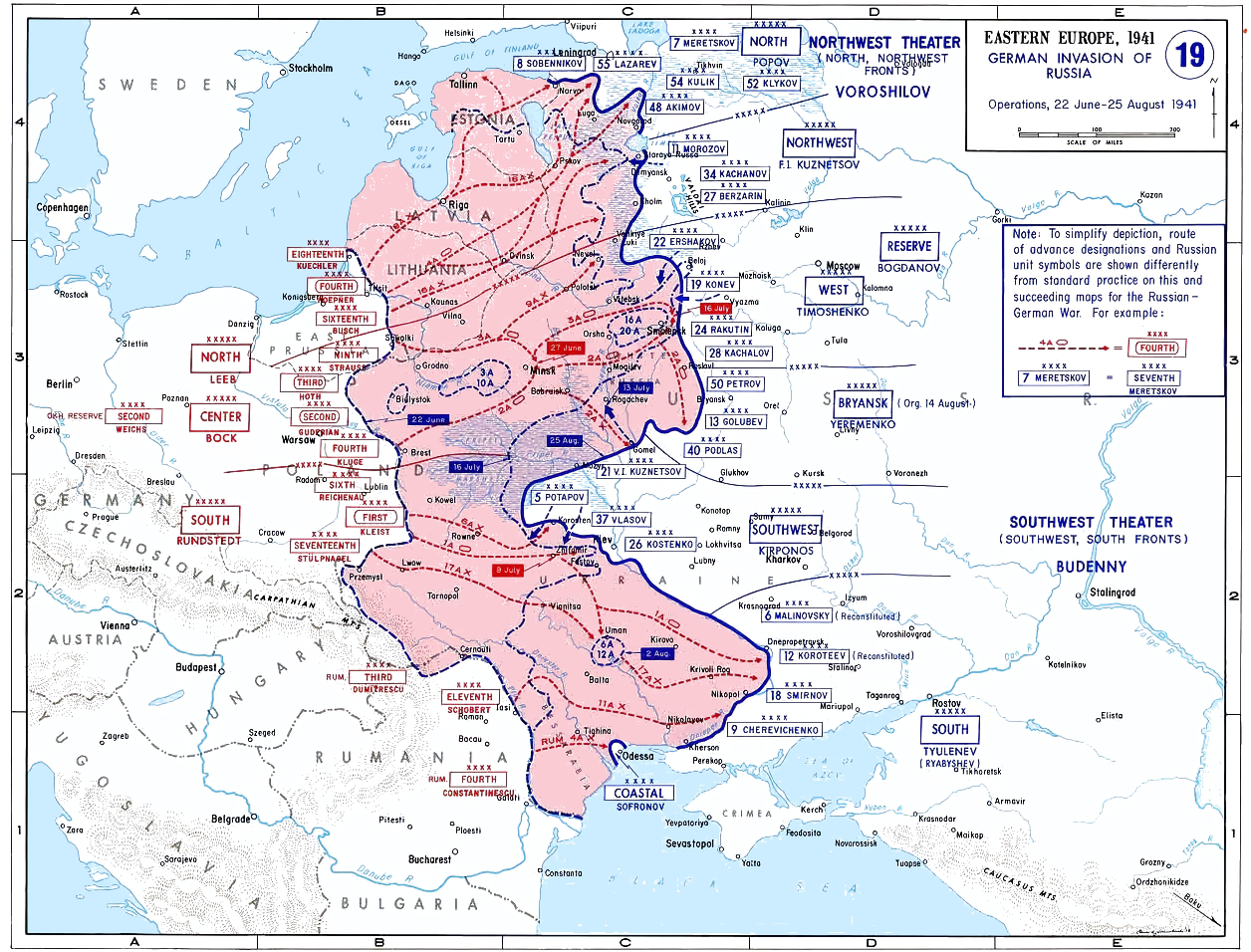
Axis Invasion of the Soviet Union, June 22 to August 25, 1941

The 12th Army (Russian: 12-я армия) was a field army of the Red Army formed multiple times during the Russian Civil War and World War II.

== Civil War & Polish-Soviet War ==
The 12th Army (Russian Civil War 1st Formation) of the Soviet Red Army was first formed from Soviet forces in the north-eastern Caucasus in 1918.

The 12th Army (Russian Civil War 2nd Formation) was formed from the 1st and 3rd Ukrainian Red Armies in central Ukraine in the summer of 1919. In July 1920 Simon Aralov was chief of intelligence with this unit. it was disbanded in 1920.

== Second World War ==
The 12th Army (1st Formation) (RKKA) of the Soviet Red Army was formed from the Southern (Cavalry-Mechanised) Army Group of the Kiev Special Military District during 1939–40.

It was then involved in the Soviet invasion of Poland in 1939. It entered the Second World War as part of the Soviet Southwestern Front, comprising the

- 13th Rifle Corps (including the 44th, 58th, and 192nd Rifle Divisions)
- 17th Rifle Corps (60th Mountain, 69th Mountain, and 164th Rifle Divisions),
- 16th Mechanised Corps (15th, 39th Tank Divisions, 240th Mechanised Division)
- 10th, 11th and 12th Fortified Regions, and artillery, engineering and other units.

It participated in the frontier battle to the west of Stanislau. In the second half of July as part of the Soviet Southern Front it conducted defensive fights in the direction of Uman. During the Battle of Uman, the Twelfth Army was caught in a huge encirclement south of Kyiv along with the 6th Army. Thus the army's headquarters was disbanded on 10 August 1941, after the battle.

The 12th Army was reformed in August 1941 as part of the Soviet Southern Front on the basis of 17th Rifle Corps. On 1 September 1941 its structure included 270th and 274th Rifle Divisions, the 11th Tank Division, 268th and 374th Corps Artillery Regiments, 64th and 181st Fighter Aviation Regiments, and a number of separate formations.

The Army defended the left bank of the Dnepr around Zaporozhye, from the end of September to the beginning of December, 1941. It participated in the Donbas defensive, Rostov defensive and offensive, in January, 1942 in the Barvenkovo–Lozovaya Offensive operations, in the subsequent conducted defensive fights in Donbas and on Northern Caucasus (part of the Battle of the Caucasus). In the middle of April 1942 the 261st Rifle Division under Colonel A.M. Ilyin, the 4th Rifle Division (Colonel Ivan Rosly), the 74th Rifle Division under General F.E.Sheverdin, the 176th Rifle Division (General Vladimir Martsinkevich) and 54th Tank Brigade under Colonel K.S. Minarov were assigned to the Army.

It was later in 1942 reorganised as a defensive zone HQ, but then reformed again by conversion of the previous 5th Tank Army in mid April 1943. It joined the Southwestern Front. Its structure included the 172nd, 203rd, 244th, 333rd and 350th Rifle Divisions and other formations. In April – July the Army was in Front reserve, and then participated in the Donbas and Zaporozhye offensive operations. In November the army HQ was disbanded, with its forces transferred to other armies.

== Commanders ==
=== First formation ===
- Komandarm Ivan Tyulenev (September 1939)
- Komkor Filipp Parusinov (October 1939 – 10 March 1941)
- Major General Pavel Ponedelin (11 March – 10 August 1941) POW

=== Second formation ===
- Major General Ivan Galanin (25 August 1941 – 16 October 1941)
- Major General Konstantin Koroteyev (17 October 1941 – 5 April 1942)
- Major General Andrei Grechko (5 April – 3 September 1942)
- Colonel Aleksandr Sokolski (4–13 September 1942)
- Lieutenant General Nikolai Kirichenko (13–20 September 1942)

=== Third formation ===
- Lieutenant-General Ivan Shlemin (20 April – 19 May 1943)
- Major-General Alexei Danilov (20 May – 30 October 1943).
