= Southern Front (Soviet Union) =

WW2 Soviet Red Army formation

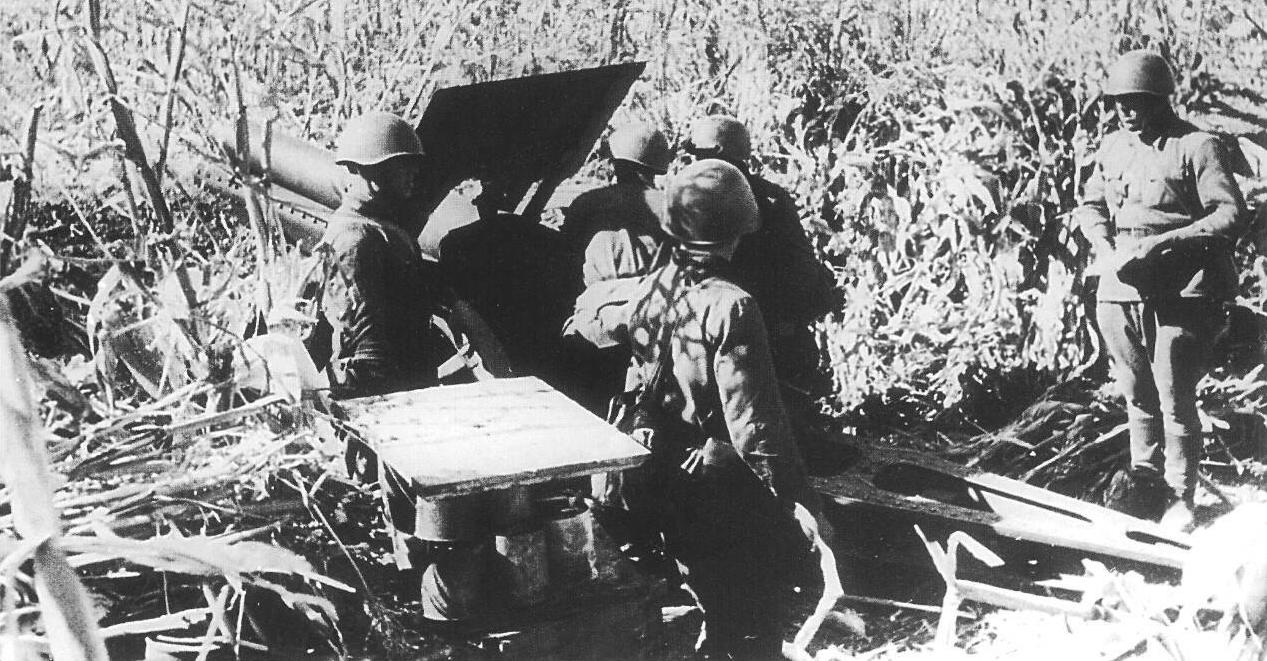
Soviet gun crew in action at Odessa in 1941.

The Southern Front was a front, a formation about the size of an army group of the Soviet Army during the Second World War. The Southern Front directed military operations during the Soviet occupation of Bessarabia and Northern Bukovina in 1940 and then was formed twice after the June 1941 invasion by Germany, codenamed Operation Barbarossa.

During the Soviet occupation of Bessarabia and Northern Bukovina in 1940, the Soviets deployed three armies (12th, 5th and 9th). Altogether the Soviet Southern Front opposing Bessarabia and Bukovina consisted of 32 (or 31) rifle divisions, 2 (or 3) motorised rifle divisions, 6 cavalry divisions, 11 tank brigades, 3 airborne brigades (one in reserve), 14 corps artillery regiments, 16 artillery regiments of the Reserve of the Supreme High Command and 4 heavy artillery divisions. These force totalled around 460,000 men, ca. 12,000 guns and mortars, ca. 3,000 tanks and 2,160 aircraft.

== First Formation ==
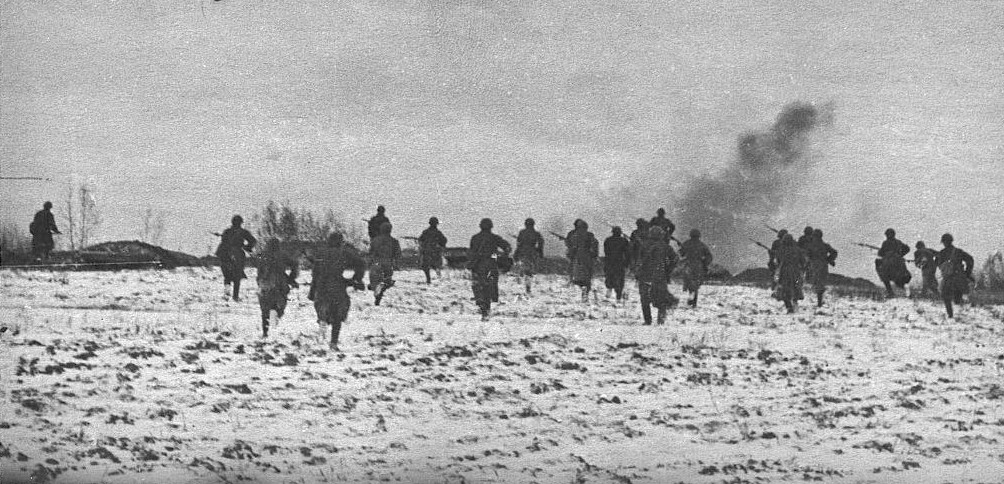
Troops of the front in pursuit of retreating German forces, October 1941

After the German invasion, the Southern Front was re-created on June 25, 1941 from the forces in the Moscow and Odessa Military Districts, and included the 9th and 28th Armies. From July 1941 the 44th Fighter Aviation Division was part of the Front's air forces. It was commanded by General Ivan V. Tiulenev from June 1941 to August 1941. Lieutenant General Dmitri I. Ryabyshev took over on 30 August 1941 and held command until 5 October, when Colonel General Yakov Cherevichenko took command, until December 1941. During 1941 the Front fought in the border battles in the southern Ukraine, defended Odessa, and then conducted the defense and successful counteroffensive at Rostov-on-Don.

Lieutenant General Rodion Ia. Malinovsky arrived in December and held the reins until July 1942. In 1942 the Front took part in the Donbass, Barvenko-Lozovaia, and Voronezh-Stalingrad (Volgograd) operations. According to Glantz and Bonn, the Front then suffered a notable failure at the Second Battle of Kharkov. The Front received additional forces from the (disbanded) Southwestern Front on July 12, 1942 and was formally disbanded on July 28, 1942, with the forces transferred to the North Caucasus Front.

=== Commanders ===
- Army General Ivan Tyulenev (21 June 1941 - 20 August 1941),
- Lieutenant General Dmitry Ryabyshev (30 August 1941 - 5 October 1941),
- Colonel General Yakov Cherevichenko (5 October 1941 - December 1941),
- Lieutenant General Rodion Malinovsky (December 1941 - 28 June 1942).

== Second Formation ==
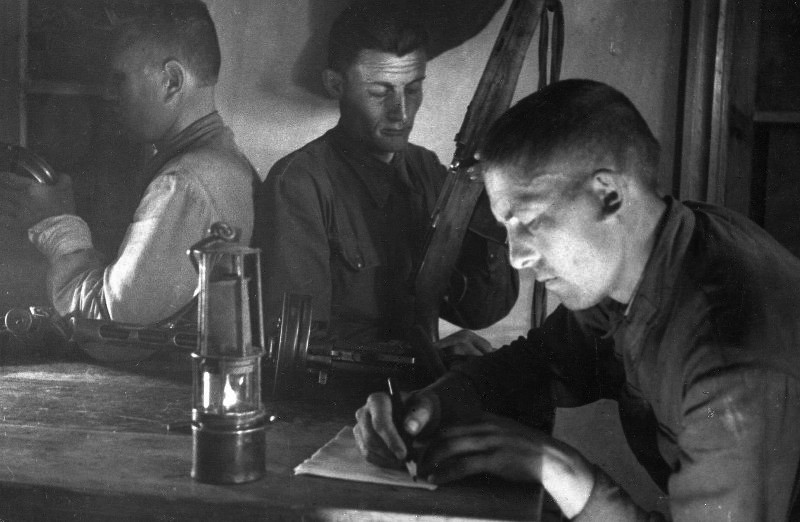
A soldier of the Southern Front writes a letter to relatives, 1943

In July 1942, three armies (the 1st, 5th and 7th Reserve Armies) out of the Supreme High Command reserve were moved into the Stalingrad sector and redesignated the 64th, 63rd and 62nd armies respectively. They formed the core of the Stalingrad Front on 12 July. The Stalingrad Front was then divided into the Stalingrad Front, under General Lieutenant V.N. Gordov, and the Southeastern Front, under Colonel General Andrei I. Yeremenko on 7 August 1942 as the Battle of Stalingrad began. Stalin had actually taken the decision to split the two fronts on 3 August at 0300 despite protest from his advisors. The Tsaritsa gully in Stalingrad was the dividing line. Yeremenko's new South-Eastern Front included the 51st, 57th, and 64th Armies. They were then re-transformed into the Don and Southwestern Fronts on 28 September with the Southeastern Front becoming the Stalingrad Front (Second Formation).

The Southern Front was re-formed from the Stalingrad Front on January 1, 1943, and Colonel General Andrei I. Yeremenko stayed in command, until February 1943. General Lieutenant Rodion Malinovsky [promoted to Colonel General in February 1943] then filled in until Lieutenant General Fyodor I. Tolbukhin took command in March 1943. Tolbukhin was promoted to Colonel General in April. He would command the Front into 1944.

On 1 April 1943 Southern Front comprised

- 2nd Guards Army,
- 5th Shock Army,
- 28th Army,
- 44th Army,
- 51st Army,
- 8th Air Army,
- and a significant number of Front troops.

Among the Front troops were the

- 3rd Guards Cavalry Corps (5th and 6th Guards, 32nd Cavalry Divisions, 14th Guards Anti-Tank Artillery Regiment, 3rd Guards Separate Anti-Tank Battalion, 64th Guards Mortar Battalion),
- 4th Guards Cavalry Corps (9th and 10th Guards, 30th Cavalry Divisions, 152nd Guards Anti-Tank Artillery Regiment, 4th Guards Separate Anti-Tank Battalion, 68th Guards Mortar Battalion, 255th Anti-Aircraft Artillery Regiment)
- 5th Guards Cavalry Corps (11th and 12th Guards, 63rd Cavalry Divisions, 150th Guards Anti-Tank Artillery Regiment, 5th Guards Separate Anti-Tank Battalion, 72nd Guards Mortar Battalion, 585th Anti-Aircraft Artillery Regiment),
- 3rd Guards Mechanized Corps,
- 4th Guards Mechanized Corps,
- 76th Fortified Region,
- 78th Fortified Region,
- 116th Fortified Region.

Southern Front was renamed the 4th Ukrainian Front on October 20, 1943.

=== Commanders ===
- Colonel-General Andrei Yeremenko (January 1, 1943 - February 2, 1943)
- Lieutenant General Rodion Malinovsky (February 2, 1943 - March 22, 1943), Colonel-General since February 12,
- Colonel General Fyodor Tolbukhin March 22, 1943 - October 20, 1943), Colonel-General since April 28, Army general since September 21
