= Voronezh–Kharkov offensive =

Soviet strategy to push back the Nazis to central Ukraine in 1943

- Part of the Eastern Front of World War II
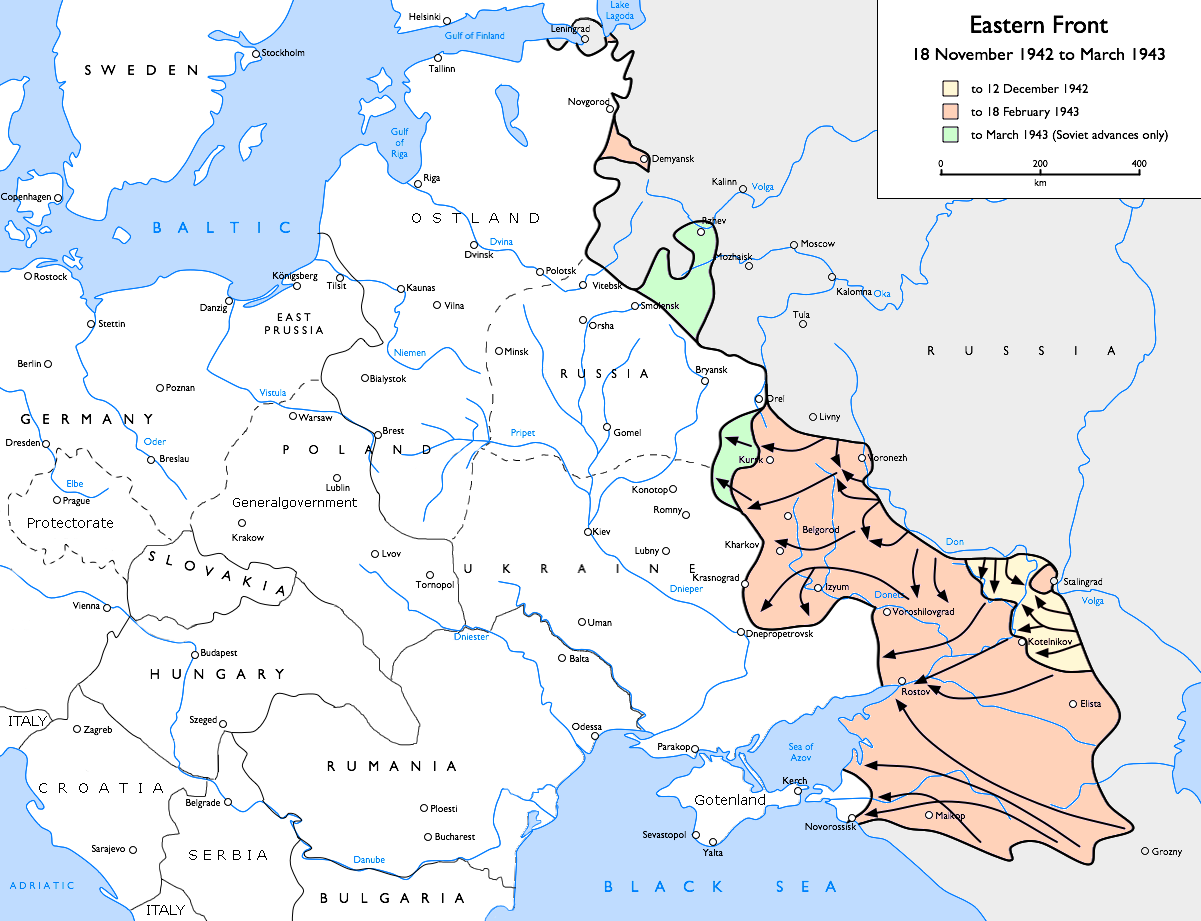
- Eastern Front 1942–11 to 1943–03
Date	January 13 to March 3, 1943
Location	Voronezh Oblast, Kursk Oblast, Belgorod Oblast, Kharkov Oblast
Result	Soviet victory

Belligerents
Germany; Hungary; Italy	Soviet Union

Commanders and leaders
(Nazi Germany) Maximilian von Weichs (Kingdom of Hungary (1920–1946)) Gusztáv Jány (Fascist Italy) Italo Gariboldi	(Soviet Union) Filipp Golikov (Soviet Union) Max Reyter (Soviet Union) Nikolai Vatutin

Units involved
(Nazi Germany) Army Group B (Kingdom of Hungary (1920–1946)) 2nd Army (Fascist Italy) 8th Army	(Soviet Union) Voronezh Front (Soviet Union) Bryansk Front (Soviet Union) Southwestern Front

Strength
30 divisions	502,400 men

Casualties and losses
321,000; 246,000 killed and captured 75,000 wounded or sick, 3,400 artillery pieces, 578 tanks	153,561; 55,475 killed or missing 98,086 wounded/sick

The Voronezh–Kharkov strategic offensive operation was a successful strategic offensive operation of the Red Army's Voronezh, Bryansk and South-Western fronts, carried out from January 13 to March 3, 1943 with the aim of defeating the German Army Group B and liberating a large territory and the important industrial and administrative centers Voronezh, Kursk, Belgorod and Kharkov.

== Prelude ==
In the winter of 1942/43, the Red Army launched several large offensives on the southern part of the Eastern Front in the wake of the Battle of Stalingrad. In late December, at the same time as the German 6th Army was increasingly enclosed in Stalingrad by the troops of Konstantin Rokossovsky, the troops of the Southwestern Front defeated the Italian 8th Army as part of the Operation Little Saturn and reached the line Novaya Kalitwa – Markovka – Volozhin – Chernikovsky.

The Stavka planned in the course of these successes a major strategic operation, which aimed at cutting off all German forces in the Caucasus, by taking Rostov-on-Don. At the same time, the Voronezh Front, in cooperation with the left wing of the Bryansk Front and the right wing of the Southwestern Front, was tasked with a strong offensive towards Voronezh and Kursk, which aimed to retake Kharkov.

The Voronezh-Kharkov strategic offensive operation had three phases:

- Ostrogozhsk–Rossosh offensive – from January 13 to January 27, 1943;
- Voronezh–Kastornoye operation – from January 24 to February 2, 1943;
- Kharkov offensive operation (operation "Star") – from February 19 to March 14, 1943.

The operation took 50 days. The width of the front of hostilities was between 250–400 km. The depth of advance of Soviet troops was between 360–520 km, or an average daily advance of 7–10 km.

== Order of battle ==
=== USSR ===
- Voronezh Front (Front commander – Filipp Golikov):
  - 60th Army (Ivan Chernyakhovsky)
  - 40th Army (Kirill Moskalenko)
  - 69th Army (Mikhail Kazakov)
  - 3rd Tank Army (Pavel Rybalko)
  - 38th army (Nikandr Chibisov)
- Bryansk Front (Front commander – Max Reyter)
  - 13th Army (Nikolai Pukhov),
- Southwestern Front (Front commander – Nikolai Vatutin)
  - 6th Army (Fedor Kharitonov).
- Air support
  - 2nd Air Army (Konstantin Smirnov)
  - 13th Air Army (Stepan Rybalchenko)

=== Germany ===
Army Group B (Field Marshal Maximilian von Weichs):

- 2nd Army (Hans von Salmuth)
  - VII Army Corps (Ernst-Eberhard Hell)
  - XIII Army Corps (Erich Straube)
  - LV Army Corps (Rudolf Freiherr von Roman)
- 4th Panzer Army (Hermann Hoth)
- Italian 8th Army (Italo Gariboldi)
- Hungarian 2nd Army (Gusztáv Jány)

== Results ==
The Voronezh-Kharkov Operation was a clear defeat for Army Group B. The 8th Italian Army and the 2nd Hungarian Army were almost completely destroyed.
Several large cities were liberated: Voronezh, Kursk, Belgorod, Kharkov, Rossosh, Valuyki, Ostrogozhsk, Kastornoye, Stary Oskol, Novy Oskol, Shchigry, Oboyan, Bogodukhov, Akhtyrka and Sevsk.

In the ensuing Third Battle of Kharkov, German troops recaptured Kharkov (March 16) and Belgorod (March 18) from the overstretched Soviet Army.

During the operation, the Soviets lost in total: 153,561 soldiers, of which 55,475 were killed and 98,086 people were wounded.
