= Ostrogozhsk–Rossosh offensive =

1943 Soviet offensive of WWII

- Part of the Eastern Front of World War II
Date	13 January 1943 – 27 January 1943
Location	Ostrogozhsk, Rossosh 50°42′N 39°25′E
Result	Soviet victory

Belligerents
Hungary; Italy	Soviet Union

Commanders and leaders
(Kingdom of Hungary (1920–1946)) Gusztáv Jány (Fascist Italy) Italo Gariboldi	(Soviet Union) Filipp Golikov (Soviet Union) Pavel Rybalko

Units involved
(Kingdom of Hungary (1920–1946)) 2nd Army (Fascist Italy) 8th Army	(Soviet Union) 6th Army (Soviet Union) 3rd Tank Army

Strength
260,000	Unknown

Casualties and losses
52,000 dead, 71,000 captured	4,500 dead

The Ostrogozhsk–Rossosh offensive (Russian: Острогожско-Россошанская операция) was an offensive of the Voronezh Front on the Eastern Front of World War II against the Hungarian 2nd Army and parts of the Italian 8th Army as part of the Voronezh–Kharkov offensive.

The offensive came after Operation Little Saturn, made in support of the Stalingrad encirclement. The offensive was supported from the south by the right flank of the Soviet 6th Army and the 3rd Tank Army of Pavel Rybalko.
