= Voronezh–Kastornoye offensive =

Soviet counter-offensive on the Eastern Front of World War II

- Part of the Eastern Front of World War II
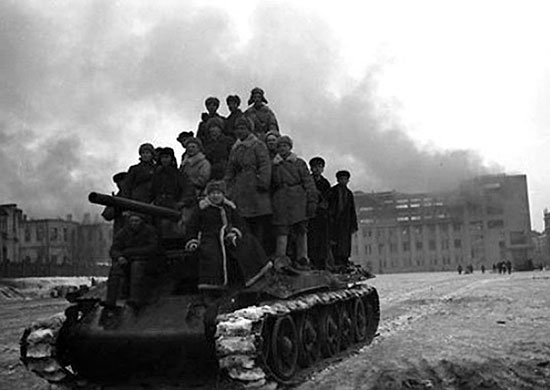
- Soviet soldiers in the liberated city of Voronezh, on 25 January 1943
Date	24 January – 17 February 1943
Location	Voronezh, Kastornoye, Soviet Union
Result	Soviet victory

Belligerents
Germany; Hungary	Soviet Union

Commanders and leaders
(Nazi Germany) Maximilian von Weichs (Nazi Germany) Hans von Salmuth (Hungary) Gusztáv Jány	(Soviet Union) Aleksandr Vasilevsky (Soviet Union) Filipp Golikov (Soviet Union) Max Reyter

Units involved
(Nazi Germany) 2nd Army; (Hungary) 2nd Army	(Soviet Union) Voronezh Front; (Soviet Union) Bryansk Front

Strength
327,900 men, 960 tanks, 600 Aircraft	987,000 men, 2,100 tanks, 1,100 Aircraft

Casualties and losses
58,000 dead, wounded, missing, about 20,000 taken prisoner Total: 78,000 overall	75,000 overall

The 1943 Battle of Voronezh or Voronezh–Kastornoye offensive operation (often credited in Russian as the liberation of Voronezh (освобождение Воронежа)) was a Soviet counter-offensive on the Eastern Front of World War II on recapturing the city of Voronezh during January 1943.

It took place between 24 January and 17 February 1943, as 4th phase of the general Soviet winter offensive of 1942–1943, immediately following the Ostrogozhsk–Rossosh offensive.

The Axis had captured Voronezh in a 1942 battle, and the 2nd German Army occupied this important bridgehead over the Don, together with Hungarian troops that had escaped the destruction of the Hungarian 2nd Army during the Ostrogozhsk–Rossosh offensive.

The Red Army executed a new pincer movement in difficult winter conditions. From the south, the troops of the Voronezh Front under command of General Golikov attacked, in collaboration with the left flank of the Bryansk Front under General Max Reyter, which attacked from the north.

The Germans, attacked on both flanks, were forced into a retreat in the middle of the Russian winter. Their losses were considerable and the 2nd German Army only narrowly escaped destruction, leaving a big gap in the Axis frontline. It opened for the Soviets the way to Kursk, which would be liberated during Operation Star, and also threatened the important bastion of Orel.

== Background ==
The Voronezh–Kastornoye offensive formed part of the wider series of Soviet winter operations carried out after the encirclement of German forces at Stalingrad in late 1942. During 1942, German Army Group B had advanced into the Voronezh region during Operation Blau and established a large salient on the Don River. Although the area had strategic significance, the German position became stretched as multiple divisions were detached to reinforce operations farther south. By the end of 1942, the salient was held by a mix of German and weakened Axis-allied units whose defensive capacity had been eroded by supply problems, winter conditions, and earlier fighting. Soviet attempts to regain the initiative culminated in a sequence of offensives across the southern sector of the Eastern Front. Immediately before the Voronezh–Kastornoye operation, the Red Army had broken through Axis defenses during the Ostrogozhsk–Rossosh offensive, inflicting major losses on Italian and Hungarian forces. This earlier success exposed the German 2nd Army's southern flank and opened the way for a more ambitious attempt to clear Axis forces from the Voronezh region and drive westward toward Kursk.

== Strategic Context ==
The Soviet High Command (Stavka) viewed the situation around Voronezh as an opportunity to exploit the disorganization of Army Group B. With German attention fixed on the struggling Stalingrad relief efforts, Soviet commanders proposed further attacks designed to collapse the overextended German line between the Don River and the Oskol basin. The plan envisioned coordinated strikes by the Voronezh and Bryansk Fronts to compress the salient from north and south, recapture Voronezh, and sever remaining German escape routes toward Orel and Kursk.

German commanders, meanwhile, attempted to stabilize the front despite serious shortages of manpower, armor, fuel, and winter equipment. The difficulties of supply in severe winter weather, combined with the loss of Axis-allied armies on adjacent sectors, forced the 2nd Army to defend an extended frontage with inadequate reserves. Intelligence failures caused by poor weather and pressure on German reconnaissance assets left the command unable to detect the scale of Soviet preparations.

== Opposing Forces ==
=== Soviet Forces ===
The operation was led by formations of the Voronezh Front under General Filipp Golikov and the Bryansk Front under General Maks Reyter. These fronts employed multiple rifle armies supported by tank formations, mobile groups, and air support from the 2nd and 15th Air Armies. The Soviets held a clear advantage in manpower and armor in the region, a result of reinforcements transferred from sectors secured after the Stalingrad victory. The overall plan depended on rapid exploitation by mobile units once initial breakthroughs were achieved.

=== German and Axis Forces ===
The principal German formation was the 2nd Army, commanded by General Hans von Salmuth. Its forces included several infantry divisions whose effectiveness had been diminished over preceding months. Elements of the Hungarian 2nd Army were also positioned along the northern and eastern edges of the salient, though many of these units had suffered heavy casualties in earlier operations. Defensive arrangements included prepared fieldworks and layered fortifications around the Voronezh bridgehead, but these positions were incomplete due to sustained pressure on the front and shortages of labor and equipment.

== Prelude and Soviet Planning ==
Following the January successes further south, Soviet commanders refined a plan for a double-envelopment aimed at destroying the bulk of the German 2nd Army. The concept relied on simultaneous attacks from multiple directions: the Voronezh Front would strike north and west from the Don bend, while the Bryansk Front advanced southward toward Kastornoye. The meeting point of these thrusts, a railway junction critical to German logistics, was chosen to isolate German forces caught in the salient.

Planning took into account both the advantages and risks posed by severe winter conditions. While frozen ground improved mobility for tanks and infantry, heavy snow hampered artillery deployment and threatened supply lines. Soviet planners also placed emphasis on maintaining momentum once the front line was breached, with the intention of overwhelming the defenders before they could reorganize.

== The Operation ==
=== Initial Assaults (24–27 January 1943) ===
The offensive began on 24 January 1943 with large-scale artillery preparation by Soviet forces, followed by coordinated infantry and armored attacks. Soviet units achieved early penetrations in several sectors where Axis forces were thinly deployed. In the Voronezh sector, Soviet armies attacked positions held by German and Hungarian divisions already weakened by previous fighting. Urban combat erupted on the approaches to Voronezh, while to the north and west Soviet troops drove into German lines to widen the breaches.

Despite local counterattacks by German units attempting to stabilize the front, the Soviets maintained pressure along a broad frontage, preventing the defenders from concentrating reserves. Air support played a significant role in disrupting German withdrawals and reinforcing Soviet breakthroughs.

=== Encirclement Phase (late January – early February) ===
As Soviet armies expanded their penetrations, mobile formations moved rapidly through gaps in the German line, threatening major communications hubs. By the end of January, advancing units converged on Kastornoye, aiming to cut the main railway routes supporting German forces in the region. Axis counterattacks attempted to reopen corridors for withdrawal, but they were unable to reverse the deteriorating situation.

By early February, Soviet forces had effectively encircled a large group of Axis units positioned west and northwest of Voronezh. Several divisions became trapped in pockets where shortages of ammunition, fuel, and food made organized resistance increasingly difficult. Bitter fighting occurred around towns and road junctions as German commanders attempted to extract surviving troops, but many formations suffered heavy losses during the retreat.

=== Pursuit and Liberation (February 1943) ===
Once the main German groupings were encircled or forced into disorderly withdrawal, the Soviet fronts pursued westward to prevent the defenders from establishing new defensive positions. Voronezh was fully retaken as Soviet troops advanced through the city and eliminated remaining pockets of resistance.

Further west, Soviet units moved toward Kursk and Belgorod, liberating towns and villages as Axis forces withdrew toward the Orel–Kursk line. The retreat of the German 2nd Army left substantial portions of the front exposed and contributed to the collapse of German positions in the region. By mid-February, the main objectives of the operation had been achieved, and Soviet forces prepared for subsequent offensives aimed at the Kharkov region.

== Aftermath ==
=== Casualties and Losses ===
Exact casualty figures for the operation vary by source and are difficult to establish due to the rapid movement and scale of the fighting. Soviet losses were significant due to intense winter combat and assaults against entrenched positions. Axis forces suffered heavy casualties during both the initial fighting and subsequent withdrawals, with numerous units losing substantial portions of their strength. Material losses on both sides included large numbers of vehicles, artillery pieces, and equipment abandoned in harsh weather conditions.

== Strategic Consequences ==
The Voronezh–Kastornoye offensive marked a major Soviet success during the winter campaign of 1942–43. The destruction and disorganization inflicted on Axis formations in the region weakened Army Group B and contributed to the collapse of German control over the middle Don basin. The operation opened the way for Soviet advances toward Kursk and Kharkov and helped set the operational stage for the larger battles that unfolded in the spring and summer of 1943.

More broadly, the offensive demonstrated improved Soviet capability to coordinate multi-front operations, integrate infantry, armor, and air power, and exploit weaknesses in German command and supply structures. The loss of the Voronezh salient forced the Wehrmacht into a defensive posture across much of the southern front and further eroded its capacity to conduct major offensives.
