= Voronezh (disambiguation) =

Voronezh is a major city in Russia.

Voronezh may also refer to:

== Populated places ==
- Voronezh, Altai Krai, a minor settlement in Russia
- The Russian name of Voronizh, a settlement in Ukraine
- Voronezh Oblast, a federal subject of Russia centered in the city

== Other geographical features ==
- Voronezh (river)
- 4519 Voronezh, a minor planet

== Other ==
- Voronezh-1 railway station
- Voronezh radar
- Russian submarine Voronezh (K-119)
- FC Fakel Voronezh
- FC Fakel-M Voronezh
- "To bomb Voronezh", a Russian internet meme

== See also ==
- Battle of Voronezh (disambiguation)
