= Operation Little Saturn =

Soviet attack on German holdouts

- Part of the Battle of Stalingrad during the Eastern Front
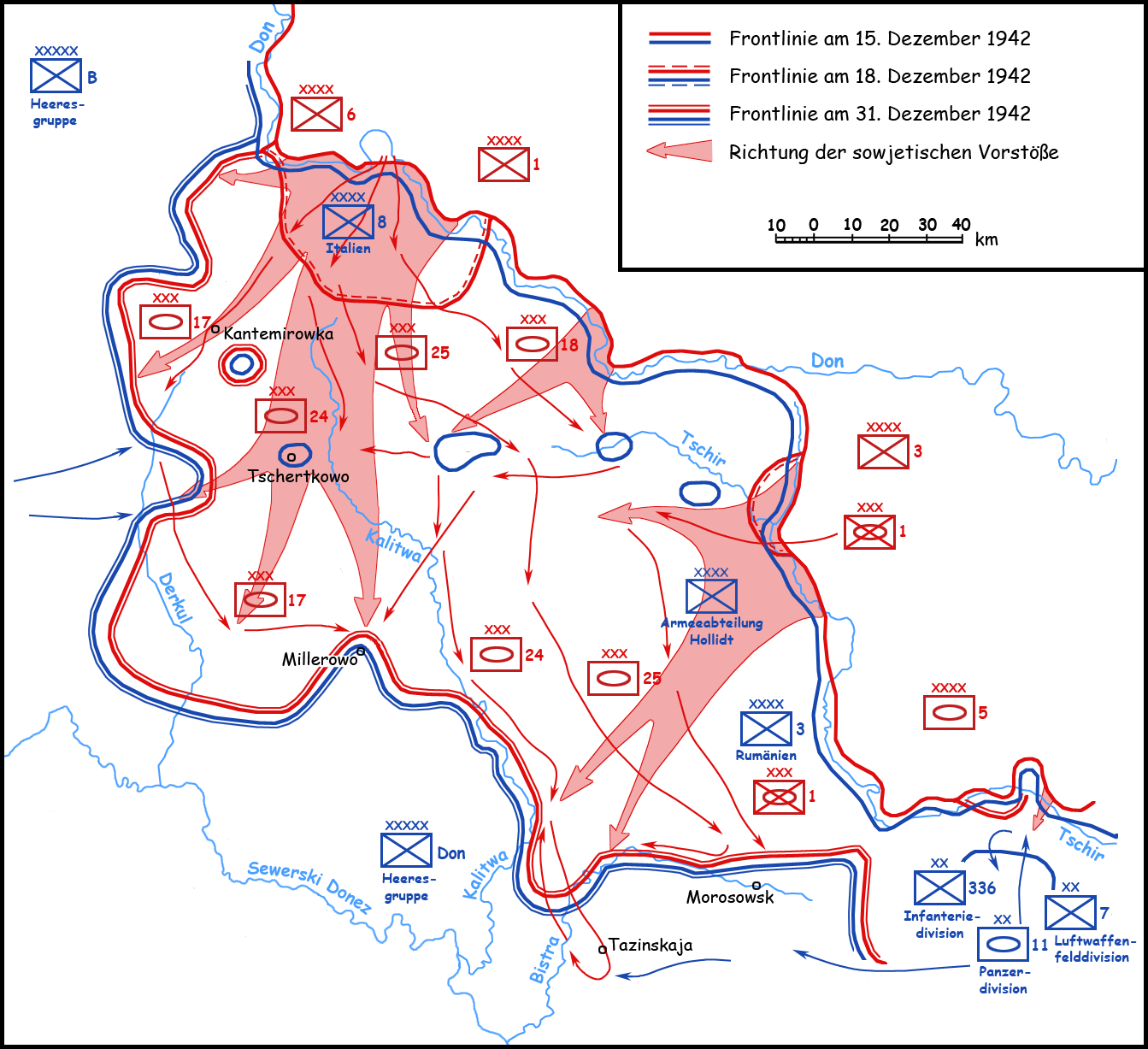
- Soviet advances during Little Saturn.
Date	16–30 December 1942 (2 weeks)
Location	Don and Chir rivers region
Result	Soviet victory

Belligerents
Germany; Italy; Hungary; Romania	Soviet Union

Commanders and leaders
(Nazi Germany) Adolf Hitler (Nazi Germany) Erich von Manstein (Nazi Germany) Erhard Raus (Nazi Germany) Edwald von Kleist (Kingdom of Italy) Italo Gariboldi (Kingdom of Italy) Enrico Pezzi † (Kingdom of Italy) Paolo Tarnassi † (Kingdom of Hungary (1920–1946)) Gusztáv Jány (Kingdom of Romania) Petre Dumitrescu	(Soviet Union) Joseph Stalin (Soviet Union) Nikolai Vatutin (Soviet Union) Fyodor Kuznetsov (Soviet Union) Dmitri Lelyushenko (Soviet Union) Vasily Gerasimenko (Soviet Union) Filipp Golikov

Strength
Unknown	Unknown

Casualties and losses
Unknown	Unknown

Operation Little Saturn (Russian: операция «Малый Сатурн», romanized: operatsiya "Malyy Saturn") was a Red Army offensive on the Eastern Front of World War II that led to battles in Don and Chir rivers region in German-occupied Soviet Union territory from 16 to 30 December 1942.

The success of Operation Uranus, launched on 19 November 1942, had trapped 250,000 troops of General Friedrich Paulus' German 6th Army and parts of General Hoth's 4th Panzer Army in Stalingrad. To exploit this victory, the Soviet general staff planned an ambitious offensive with Rostov-on-Don as the ultimate objective, codenamed "Saturn". Later, Joseph Stalin reduced his ambitious plans to a relatively smaller operation codenamed "Little Saturn". The offensive succeeded in smashing the Axis troops and applied pressure on the over-stretched German forces in Eastern Ukraine. Another counter-offensive south of the Don prevented further German advances to the relief of the entrapped forces at Stalingrad.

With subsequent operations, in January and February 1943, the Soviet armies eventually reached and took Rostov as originally planned in "Saturn". Despite these victories, the Soviets themselves became over-extended, setting up the stages for the German offensives of the Third Battle of Kharkov and the Battle of Kursk.

== Background ==
On 17 May 1942, German Army Groups A and B launched a counteroffensive against advancing Soviet armies around the city of Kharkov, resulting in the Second Battle of Kharkov; this would ultimately be expanded on 28 June into Case Blue, which aimed to capture the Caucasus oil fields. By 6 July, General Hermann Hoth's Fourth Panzer Army had taken the city of Voronezh, threatening to collapse the Red Army's resistance. By early August, General Paul Ludwig Ewald von Kleist's First Panzer Army had reached the oil center of Maykop, 500 kilometres (310 mi) south of the city of Rostov, which had been taken by the Fourth Panzer Army on 23 July. The rapid German advance threatened to cut the Soviet Union off from its southern territories, while also threatening to cut the Lend-Lease supply through the Persian Corridor. However, the offensive began to peter out, as the supply train struggled to keep up with the advance and spearhead units began to run low on fuel and manpower; for example, some panzer divisions were down to 54 tanks. Eventually, the German focus shifted towards Stalingrad in an attempt to cut off supply shippings on the Volga river. The fall of Stalin's namesake city would also mean a psychological boost for the Germans and, vice versa, a blow to the Soviets. However, after months of brutal fighting in which more than 90% of the city had been conquered by the Germans, the city would eventually deplete the German forces (the 6th Army and units from 4th Panzer Army) in their unsuccessful and exhausting attempt to expel the remainder of the Soviet defences. Both sides suffered enormous casualties during this battle, but, most importantly for the outcome, the Germans severely depleted their forces, made them strip their flanks ever increasingly, leaving these in the hands of overstretched and poorly equipped Italian and Romanian allies. The dangerous situation that evolved, while addressed several times by worried German generals, were ignored and, thus, had set the circumstances for the ultimate disaster for the Germans and their allies.

=== Operation Uranus ===
Operation Uranus was the codename of the Soviet strategic operation in World War II which led to the encirclement of the German Sixth Army, Third and Fourth Romanian armies, and portions of the German 4th Panzer Army. The operation formed part of the ongoing Battle of Stalingrad, and was aimed at destroying German forces in and around Stalingrad. Planning for Operation Uranus had commenced as early as September 1942, and was developed simultaneously with plans to envelop and destroy German Army Group Center and German forces in the Caucasus. The Red Army took advantage of the fact that German forces in the southern Soviet Union were overstretched around Stalingrad, using weaker Romanian armies to guard their flanks; the offensive's starting points were established along the section of the front directly opposite Romanian forces. These Axis armies were deployed in open positions on the steppe and lacked heavy equipment to deal with Soviet armor.

=== German attempt to relieve Stalingrad ===
Operation Winter Storm (Unternehmen Wintergewitter), undertaken between 12 and 23 December 1942, was the German 4th Panzer Army's attempt to relieve encircled Axis forces during the Battle of Stalingrad. In late November, the Red Army completed Operation Uranus, which resulted in the encirclement of Axis personnel in and around the city of Stalingrad. German forces within the Stalingrad Pocket and directly outside were reorganized under Army Group Don, under the command of Field Marshal Erich von Manstein. As the Red Army continued to build strength, in an effort to allocate as many resources as possible to the eventual launch of the planned Operation Saturn, which aimed to isolate Army Group A from the rest of the German Army, the Luftwaffe had begun an attempt to supply German forces in Stalingrad through an air bridge. However, as the Luftwaffe proved incapable of carrying out its mission and it became more obvious that a successful breakout could only occur if it was launched as early as possible, Manstein decided to plan and launch a dedicated relief effort.

== Operation Little Saturn ==
=== Original plan: Saturn ===
After the defeat of the Romanian Army around Stalingrad and the successful encirclement of the German Sixth Army, Stalin started planning a counter-offensive operation nicknamed "Saturn" in order to enlarge the area controlled by the Soviet Army, with Rostov-on-Don as the ultimate objective. The Axis troops encircled in the Stalingrad pocket should have been completely destroyed in a few days, however the plan, based on an incorrect calculation by the Soviet intelligence service about the number of enemy troops actually encircled (estimated at only 80,000 men instead of the real number of over 250,000), proved impracticable and unrealistic, due to lack of logistics and vehicles of the Red Army.

=== Little Saturn ===
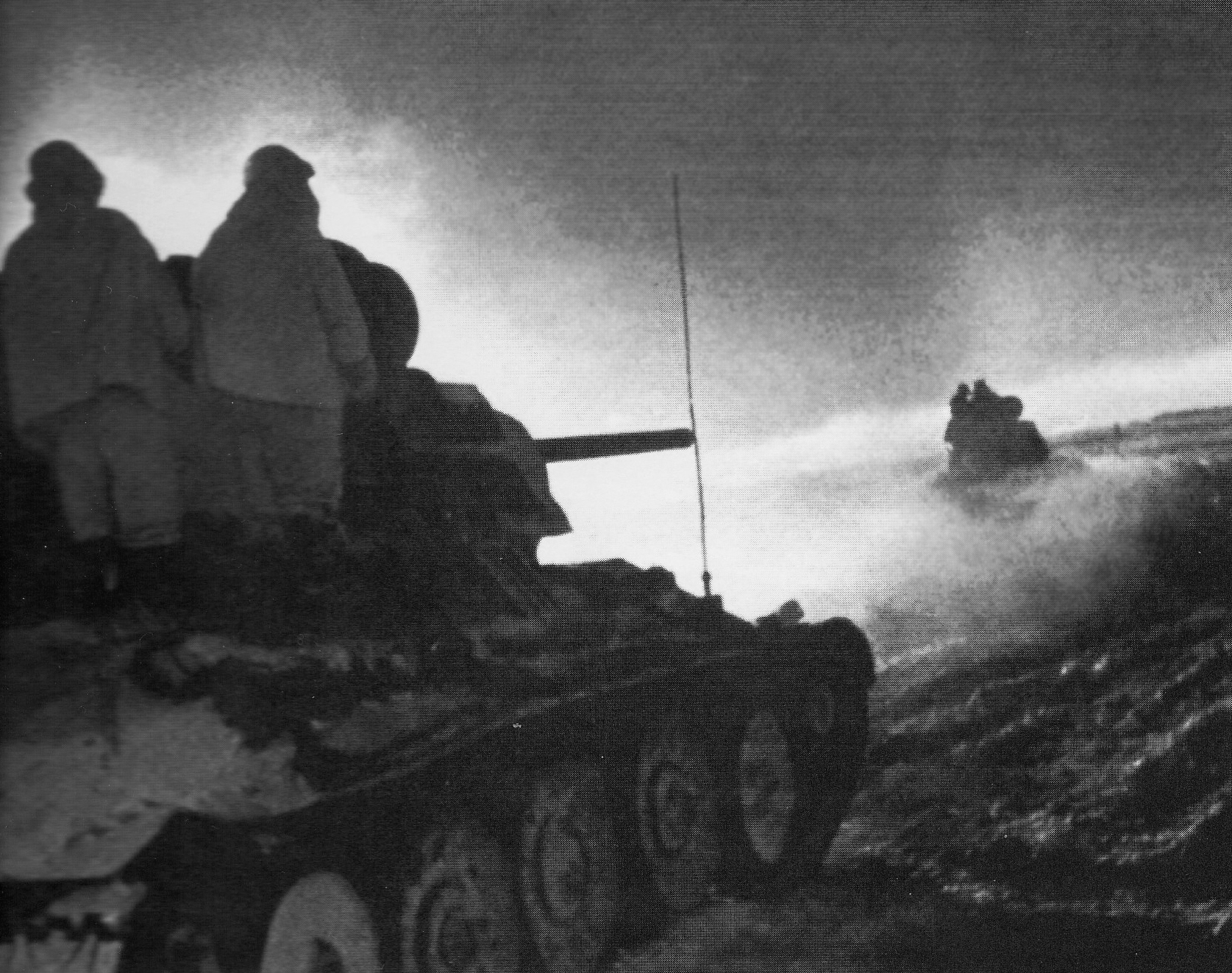
Soviet forces during Operation Little Saturn in December 1942

In the new scaled-down version of the operation, codenamed "Little Saturn", the Soviet offensive had still to attack the Axis troops on the Don and Chir rivers; after the destruction of the enemy forces, the mechanized forces would have to proceed quickly in two directions: west, to the communications center of Millerovo and south, to attack Tatsinskaya Airfield, from which the Luftwaffe planes departed to supply the Stalingrad pocket. Also, the South-Western Front was assigned a mission in which the 1st and 3rd Guard armies and the 5th Tank Army were to strike out in the general direction of Morozovsk, near Tatsinskaya, and destroy the enemy grouping in that sector. They would be supported by the 6th Army of the Voronezh Front. Any further offensive plan directed towards Rostov was therefore abandoned.

Operation Little Saturn was launched on 16 December. General Fyodor Isidorovich Kuznetsov's 1st Guards Army and General Dmitri Danilovich Lelyushenko's 3rd Guards Army attacked from the north, encircling 130,000 soldiers of the Italian 8th Army on the Don and advancing to Millerovo. The Italians resisted the Soviet attack, although outnumbered 9 to 1 in some sectors, but with huge losses. Manstein sent the 6th Panzer Division to the Italians' aid: of the 130,000 encircled troops, only 45,000 survived after bloody fighting to join the Panzers at Chertkovo.

To the south the advance of General Gerasimenko's 28th Army threatened to encircle the 1st Panzer Army and General Trufanov's 51st Army attacked the relief column directly. On 24 December, tanks of the 24th Tank Corps reached and raided Tatsinskaya Airfield, destroying German transport planes and completing the raid in a matter of a few days.

Operation Little Saturn was accompanied by another counter-offensive south of the Don which prevented further German advances to the relief of the entrapped forces at Stalingrad. With the relief column under threat of encirclement, Manstein had no choice but to retreat back to Kotelnikovo on 29 December, leaving the encircled Germans at Stalingrad to their fate. Of the 250,000 soldiers encircled, 90,000 survived to be taken prisoner. Only 5,000 lived to return to Germany. The limited scope of the Soviet offensive also gave Kleist time to withdraw his Army Group A in the direction of the Kuban, with the exception of 1st Panzer Army, which joined Army Group Don via Rostov-on-Don.

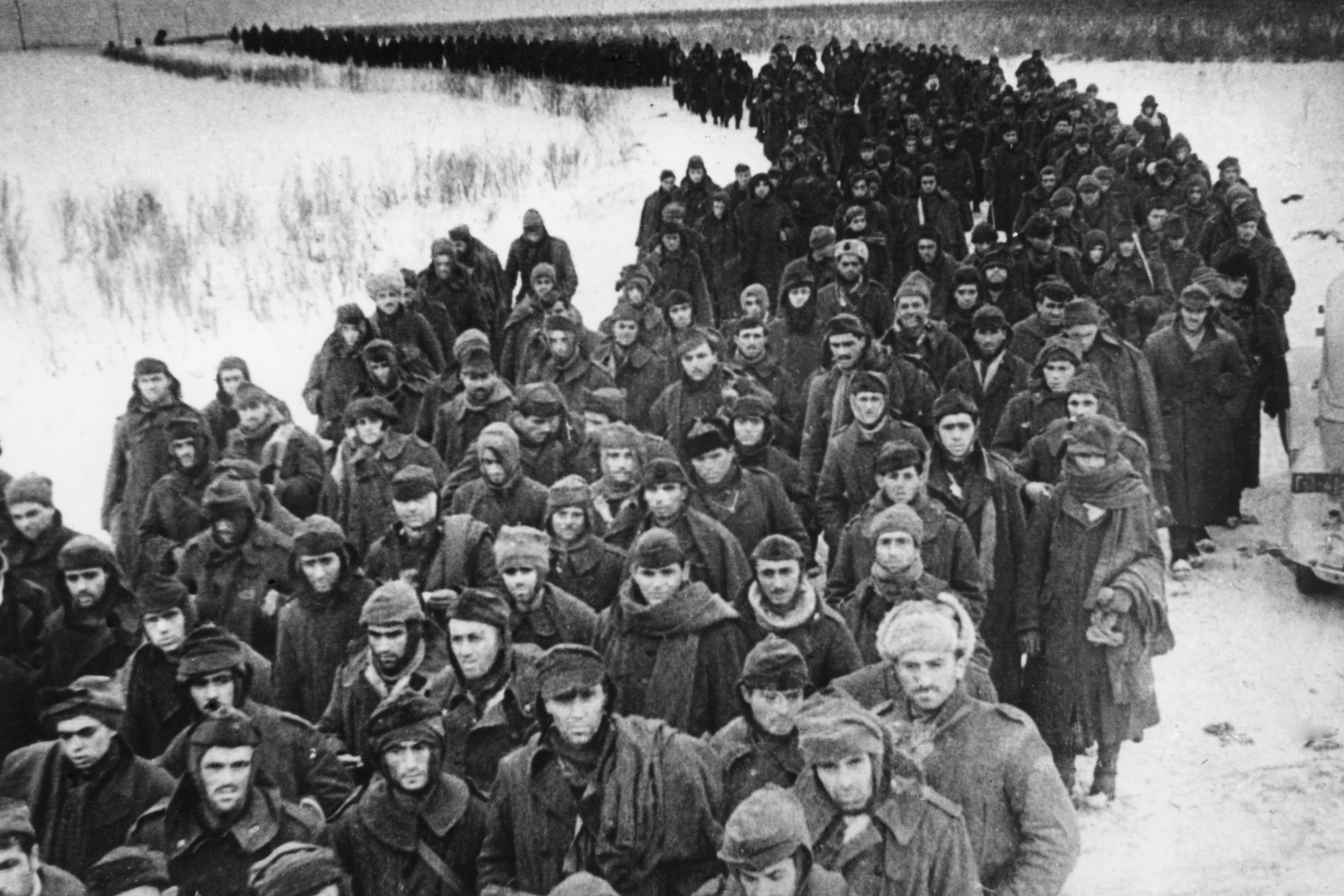
A column of Italian prisoners of war captured during Operation Little Saturn

== Subsequent operations ==
In January 1943 the Soviet armies began the Voronezh–Kharkov offensive which resulted in an advance of Soviet troops between 360 and 520 km, crashing against Axis troops. The 8th Italian Army and the 2nd Hungarian Army were almost completely destroyed. Army Group B suffered a defeat from the Soviets which now penetrated into Eastern Ukraine.

In February, the Soviet armies eventually reached and took Rostov, achieving objectives as originally planned in "Operation Saturn".

== See also ==
- Italian participation in the Eastern Front
- ARMIR
- Romanian Armies in the Battle of Stalingrad
- Hungarian Army in Operation Little Saturn

== Sources ==
- Beevor, Antony (1998). Stalingrad: The Fateful Siege: 1942−1943. Harmondsworth, United Kingdom: Penguin Putnam Inc. ISBN 0-670-87095-1.
- Bell, Kelly (Fall 2006). "Struggle for Stalin's Skies". WWII History: Russian Front (Special Issue). Herndon, Virginia: Sovereign Media. 1539-5456.
- Clark, Alan (1965). Barbarossa: The Russian-German Conflict, 1941-1945. New York City, New York: William Morrow. ISBN 0-688-04268-6.
- Cooper, Matthew (1978). The German Army 1933-1945. Lanham, Maryland: Scarborough House. ISBN 0-8128-8519-8.
- Erickson, John (1983). The Road to Berlin: Stalin's War with Germany. Yale University Press. ISBN 0-300-07813-7.
- Erickson, John (1975). The Road to Stalingrad: Stalin's War With Germany. Yale University Press. ISBN 0-300-07812-9.
- Glantz, David M. (January 1996). "Soviet Military Strategy During the Second Period of War (November 1942–December 1943): A Reappraisal". The Journal of Military History. 60 (1). Society for Military History: 115–150. doi:10.2307/2944451. JSTOR 2944451.
- Glantz, David M.; Jonathan House (1995). When Titans Clashed: How the Red Army Stopped Hitler. Lawrence, Kansas: Kansas University Press. ISBN 0-7006-0717-X.
- Heiber, Helmut; David M. Glantz (2003). Hitler and his Generals: Military Conferences 1942 - 1945. New York City, New York: Enigma Books. ISBN 1-929631-09-X.
- McCarthy, Peter; Mike Syryon (2002). Panzerkieg: The Rise and Fall of Hitler's Tank Divisions. New York City, New York: Carroll & Graf. ISBN 0-7867-1009-8.
- McTaggart, Pat (Fall 2006). "Soviet Circle of Iron". WWII History: Russian Front (Special Issue). Herndon, Virginia: Sovereign Media. 1539-5456.
- Raus, Erhard (2002). Panzers on the Eastern Front: General Erhard Raus and his Panzer Divisions in Russia 1941–1945. Mechanicsburg, PA: Military Book Club. ISBN 0-7394-2644-3.
- Trigg, Jonathan (2017) [2013]. Death on the Don: The destruction of Germany's Allies on the Eastern Front, 1941-44 (2 ed.). Stroud, Gloucestershire, UK. pp. 184–196.
- von Manstein, Erich (1982). Lost Victories. St. Paul, MN: Zenith Press. ISBN 0-7603-2054-3.
