= Voronezhsky =

Voronezhsky (masculine), Voronezhskaya (feminine), or Voronezhskoye (neuter) may refer to:

- Voronezh Oblast (Voronezhskaya oblast), a federal subject of Russia
- Voronezhsky (rural locality) (Voronezhskaya, Voronezhskoye), several rural localities in Russia
