= Battle of Voronezh =

The Battle of Voronezh may refer to two battles of the Eastern Front of World War II around the city of Voronezh in Russia:

- Battle of Voronezh (1942), from June to July 1942, in which the German 4th Panzer Army captured the city
- Battle of Voronezh (1943), in January 1943, in which the Soviet Voronezh Front recaptured the city

== See also ==
- Battle of the Voronezhka River
