= Battle of Voronezh (1942) =

Battle between Germany and the Soviet Union during WW2

- Part of Case Blue in the Eastern Front of World War II
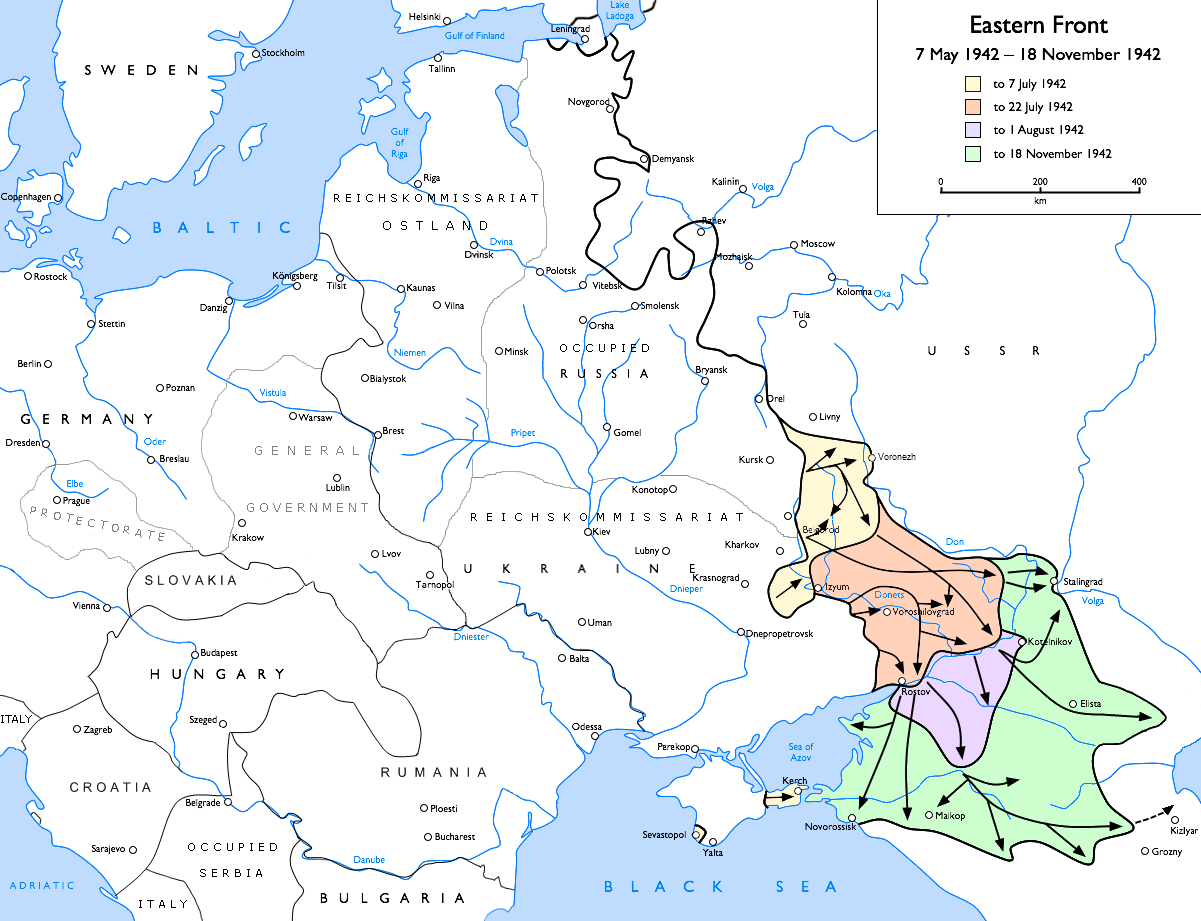
- The Eastern Front at the time of the Battle of Voronezh, in yellow. (click to enlarge)
Date	28 June – 24 July 1942
Location	Voronezh, Russian SFSR
Result	Axis victory

Belligerents
Germany; Hungary; Romania; Italy; Slovakia	Soviet Union

Commanders and leaders
Fedor von Bock; Maximilian von Weichs; Wilhelm List; Hermann Hoth; Hans von Salmuth; Friedrich Paulus; Gusztáv Jány; Ewald von Kleist; Richard Ruoff	Filipp Golikov; Nikandr Chibisov; Semyon Timoshenko; Rodion Malinovsky; Pavel Korzun; Grigory Khalyuzin; Nikolai Pukhov; Mikhail Parsegov; Fyodor Kharitonov; Maksim Antoniuk; Alexei Danilov; Dmitry Ryabyshev; Kirill Moskalenko; Anton Lopatin; Dmitry Nikishov; Pyotr Kozlov; Andrei Grechko; Fyodor Kamkov; Viktor Tsyganov; Ilya Smirnov

Units involved
Army Group B (Note: Army Group South was divided into Army Group A and B on 9 July): 4th Panzer Army; 2nd Army; 6th Army; 2nd Army; Army Group A (Note: Army Group South was divided into Army Group A and B on 9 July): 1st Panzer Army; 17th Army	Bryansk Front: 3rd Army; 48th Army; 13th Army; Voronezh Front (Note: Formed on 7 July): 40th Army (Note: Transferred from the Bryansk Front on 7 July); 6th Army; 60th Army; Southwestern Front: 21st Army; 28th Army; 38th Army; 9th Army; 57th Army; Southern Front: 37th Army; 12th Army; 18th Army; 56th Army; 24th Army

Strength
975,000	1,310,800

Casualties and losses
94,500 casualties including 19,000 KIA and MIA	568,347; 370,522 killed or missing 197,825 wounded

The Battle of Voronezh, or First Battle of Voronezh, was a battle on the Eastern Front of World War II, fought in and around the strategically important city of Voronezh on the Don river, 450 km (280 mi) south of Moscow, from 28 June to 24 July 1942, as the opening move of the German summer offensive in 1942.

The battle was marked by heavy urban and ferocious street-fighting, showing what was to come at the Battle of Stalingrad.

== Battle ==
The German attack had two objectives. One was to sow confusion about the ultimate goals of the overall campaign. There was widespread feeling by almost all observers, especially Soviet high command, that the Germans would reopen their attack on Moscow that summer. By strongly attacking toward Voronezh, near the site of the German's deepest penetration the year before, it would hide the nature of the real action taking place far to the south. Soviet forces sent to the area to shore up the defenses would not be able to move with the same speed as the Germans, who would then turn south and leave them behind. The other purpose was to provide an easily defended front line along the river, providing a strong left flank that could be protected with relatively light forces.

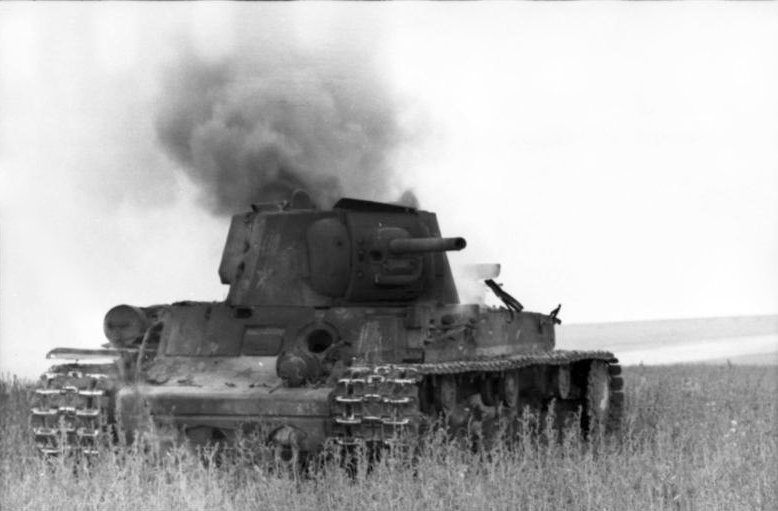
A Soviet KV-1 heavy tank destroyed near Voronezh (1942)

The plan involved forces of Army Group South, at this time far north of their ultimate area of responsibility. The attack would be spearheaded by the 4th Panzer Army under the command of General Hermann Hoth and supported by elements of the 2nd Army under the command of General Maximilian von Weichs (and General Hans von Salmuth from July 14th). Hoth's highly mobile forces would move rapidly eastward to Voronezh and then turn southeast to follow the Don to Stalingrad. As the 4th Panzer Army moved out of the city, the slower infantry forces of the Second Army following behind them would take up defensive positions along the river. The plan called for the 2nd Army to arrive just as the 4th had cleared the city, and Hoth was under orders to avoid any street-to-street fighting that might bog down their progress.

The city was defended by the troops of the 40th Army as part of the Valuiki-Rossosh Defensive Operation (28 June-24 July 1942) of General of Army Nikolai Fyodorovich Vatutin's Southwestern Front. (Note: Vatutin was born in the Voronezh area.) Hoth's powerful armored forces moved forward with little delay and the only natural barrier before the city was the Devitsa River, an arm of the Don running through Semiluki, a short distance to the west. For reasons that are unclear, the bridge over the Devitsa was not destroyed, and Hoth's forces were able to sweep aside the defensive forces placed there and reach the outskirts of Voronezh on 7 July. Soviet forces then mounted a successful counterattack that tied up Hoth's forces.

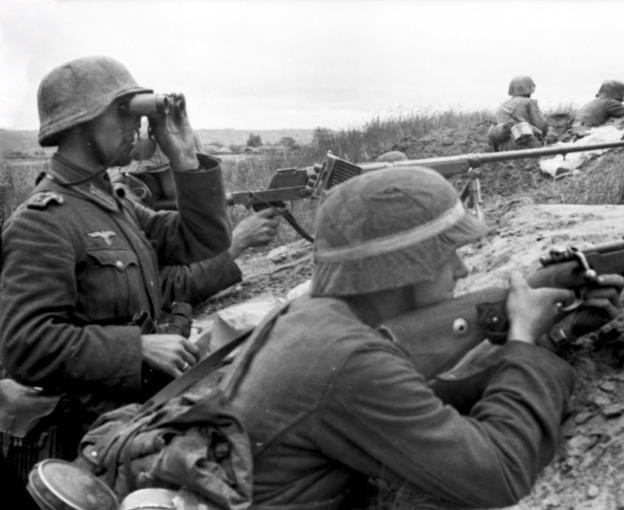
German soldiers in position near Voronezh, June 1942. The sergeant with binoculars is beside a soldier with the Panzerbüchse anti-tank rifle; in the background two soldiers with the MG 34 squad automatic gun.

At this point, they should have been relieved by the infantry forces, but these were still far from the city. Intense house-to-house fighting broke out, and Hoth continued to push forward while he waited. At one point the 3rd Motorized Division broke across the Don, but turned back. The Soviet command poured reserves into the city and a situation not unlike what would be seen at Stalingrad a few months later broke out, with the German troops clearing the city street by street with flamethrowers while tanks gave fire support.

The 2nd did not arrive for another two days, by which time the 4th was heavily engaged and took some time to remove from the line. The 2nd continued the battle until 24 July, when the final Soviet forces west of the Don were defeated and the fighting ended. Adolf Hitler later came to believe that these two days, when combined with other avoidable delays on the drive south, allowed Marshal Semyon Timoshenko to reinforce the forces in Stalingrad before the 4th Panzer Army could arrive to allow taking of Stalingrad.

The Soviet forces recaptured the city in the Battle of Voronezh of 1943.

== Sources ==
- Beevor, Antony (1998). Stalingrad. London: Viking. ISBN 978-0-14-103240-5.
- Craig, William (1973). Enemy at the Gates: The Battle for Stalingrad. New York: Penguin Books. ISBN 0-14-200000-0.
- Glantz, David M. & House, Jonathan (1995), When Titans Clashed: How the Red Army Stopped Hitler, Lawrence, Kansas: University Press of Kansas, ISBN 0-7006-0899-0.
