= Voronezhsky (rural locality) =

Voronezhsky (Russian: Воро́нежский; masculine), Voronezhskaya (Воро́нежская; feminine), or Voronezhskoye (Воро́нежское; neuter) is the name of several rural localities in Russia.

== Modern localities ==
- Voronezhsky, Irkutsk Oblast, a settlement in Kirensky District of Irkutsk Oblast
- Voronezhsky, Krasnodar Krai, a khutor in Trekhselsky Rural Okrug of Uspensky District in Krasnodar Krai; 44°40′N 41°20′E
- Voronezhskoye, a selo in Ivanovsky Selsoviet of Kochubeyevsky District in Stavropol Krai
- Voronezhskaya (rural locality), a stanitsa in Voronezhsky Rural Okrug of Ust-Labinsky District in Krasnodar Krai; 45°13′N 39°34′E

== Alternative names ==
- Voronezhsky, alternative name of Voronezh, a settlement in Karamyshevsky Selsoviet of Zmeinogorsky District in Altai Krai; 51°12′N 82°1′E

== Historical localities ==
- Voronezhsky (pogost), a rural locality which existed at some point in Kolsko-Loparskaya Volost

== See also ==
- sovkhoza Voronezhsky, a settlement in Voronezh Oblast
- Voronezhskoye-1, a selo in Khabarovsk Krai
- Voronezhskoye-2, a selo in Khabarovsk Krai
- Voronezhskoye-3, a selo in Khabarovsk Krai
