= Operation Star =

Offensive operation by the Red Army on 2 February 1943 during WW2, Eastern Front

- Part of Soviet-German Front in World War II
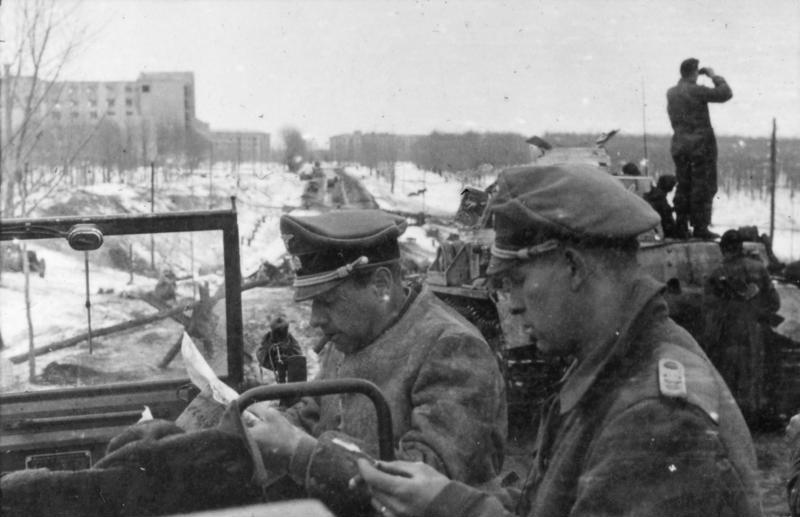
- The German army deployed to defend Kharkov.
Date	February 2 – March 3, 1943 (1 month, 2 weeks and 2 days)
Location	Belgorod–Kharkov region, Soviet Union
Result	Temporary Soviet victory

Belligerents
Soviet Union	Germany

Commanders and leaders
(Soviet Union) A. M. Vasilevsky (Soviet Union) F. I. Golikov (Soviet Union) N. F. Vatutin (Soviet Union) P. S. Rybalko	(Nazi Germany) Erich von Manstein (Nazi Germany) Hermann Hoth (Nazi Germany) Paul Hausser (Nazi Germany) Eberhard von Mackensen

Strength
347,200	Summary later

Casualties and losses
33,331 dead, 62,384 injured	18,168 dead and missing 31,601 injured

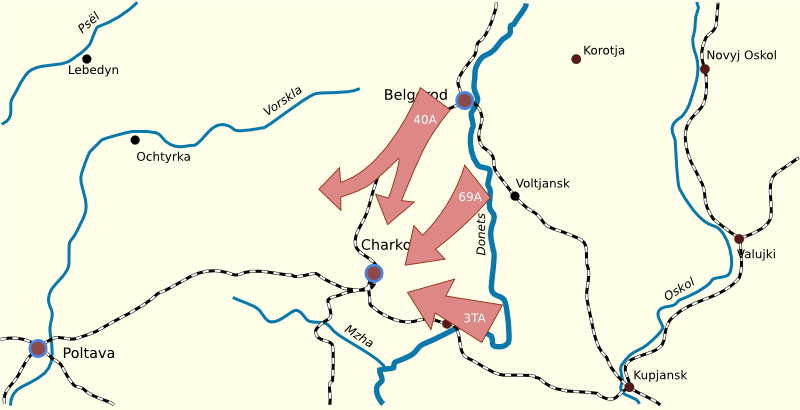
Operation Star; Soviet advances between 10 and 14 February 1943

Operation Star or Operation Zvezda (Russian: Звезда, lit. 'Star') was a Red Army offensive on the Eastern Front of World War II begun on 2 February 1943. The attack was the responsibility of the Voronezh Front under the command of Filipp Golikov and a part of the larger Voronezh-Kharkov Strategic Offensive Operation.

Its main objectives were the cities of Kharkov and Kursk. While initially successful in capturing both cities, the Soviets overextended themselves, allowing Field Marshal Erich von Manstein to launch a counteroffensive and inflict a defeat on the Soviets in the Third Battle of Kharkov.

== See also ==
- Case Blue
- Operation Gallop
