= Second Army (Hungary) =

2nd Army Második Magyar Hadsereg
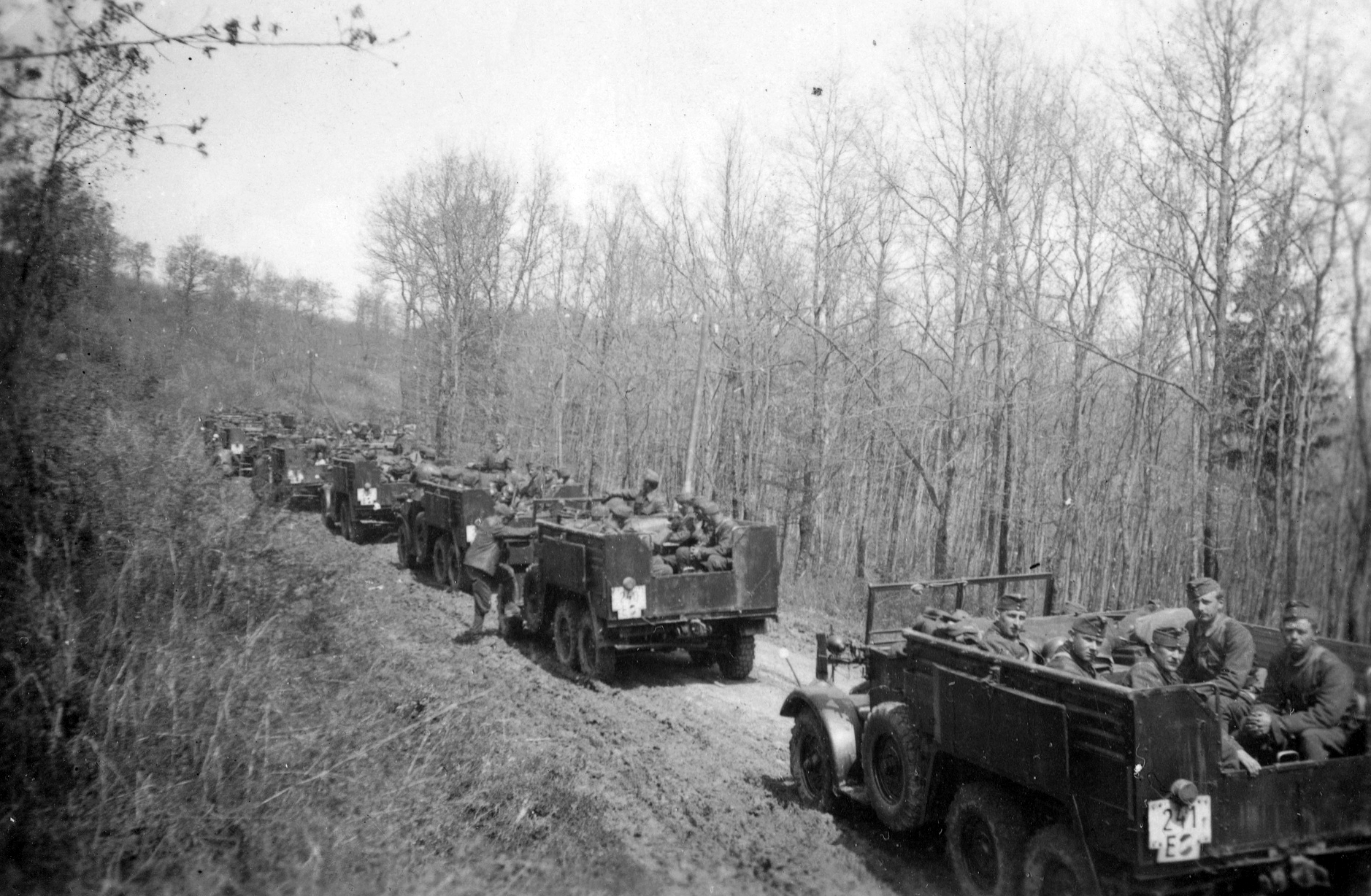
- A convoy of Hungarian troops in Russia in 1942
- Active: 1940–44
- Country: Kingdom of Hungary
- Branch: Royal Hungarian Army
- Type: Infantry
- Size: Field army (209,000) (11 April 1942)
- Engagements: World War II: Case Blue; Battle of Voronezh; Ostrogozhsk–Rossosh offensive; Battle of Debrecen; Battle of Stalingrad

Commanders
- Notable commanders: Gusztáv Jány; Géza Lakatos

The Hungarian Second Army (Második Magyar Hadsereg) was one of three field armies raised by the Kingdom of Hungary which saw action during World War II. All three armies were formed on March 1, 1940. The Second Army was the best-equipped Hungarian formation at the beginning of the war, but was virtually eliminated as an effective fighting unit by overwhelming Soviet force during the Battle of Stalingrad, suffering 84% casualties. Towards the end of the war, a reformed Second Army fought more successfully at the Battle of Debrecen, but, during the ensuing Siege of Budapest, it was destroyed completely and absorbed into the Hungarian Third Army.

== Occupation duties ==
The Kingdom of Hungary was a reluctant member of the Axis at the beginning of the European conflict. Hungary's head of state was Regent Admiral Miklós Horthy and the government was led by Prime Minister Pál Teleki. On April 3, 1941, Teleki committed suicide when it became clear that Hungary was to take part in the invasion of Yugoslavia, its erstwhile ally.

The comparatively small Hungarian Army had a peacetime strength of only 80,000 men. Militarily, the nation was divided into seven corps commands. Each army corps consisted of three infantry divisions, each of which comprised three infantry regiments and an artillery regiment. Each corps also included two cavalry-brigades, two motorized infantry brigades, an anti-aircraft battery, a signals company, and a cavalry reconnaissance troop. On March 11, 1940, the Hungarian Army was expanded to three field armies, each with three corps. All three of these field armies were to see action against the Red Army before the end of the war.

Hungary did not immediately participate in Operation Barbarossa, the German invasion of the Soviet Union. Adolf Hitler did not directly ask for, nor necessarily want, Hungarian assistance at that time. Most of the Hungarian forces, including the three field armies, were initially relegated to duties within the reenlarged Hungarian state. Hungary regained substantial portions of its territories that had been ceded following the loss of World War I and the resultant Treaty of Trianon.

At the end of June 1941, Germany summoned Hungary to join in the attack on the Soviet Union. Hungary continued to resist joining in the war. The matter was settled on June 26, 1941, when Košice (Kassa) was bombed, which the Hungarian government attributed to the Soviet Union.

The Kingdom of Hungary declared war on the Soviet Union the next day, June 27, 1941. At first, only Hungary's "Karpat Group" with its integral "Rapid Corps" (Gyorshadtest) was sent to the Eastern Front, in support of the German 17th Army. Towards the end of 1941, only the exhausted and battle weary "Rapid Corps" was left. But, before Horthy would gain Hitler's consent to withdraw the "Rapid Corps," he had to agree to deploy an even larger Hungarian force.

== On the Eastern Front ==
Of the three Hungarian field armies, high command decided to send the Second Army. (The First Army was considered to be the "best" and the Third Army was still being organized). However the Armed Forces in general were so poorly equipped that practically all "modern" equipment (which was still dated by contemporary standards) was provided to the 2nd Army. Even after these desperate measures, the Second Army still lacked adequate motorized transport and especially anti-tank weapons. Germany had promised to provide the necessary equipment, but failed to deliver any meaningful quantities.

Practically all the armored troops Hungary had were re-organized into the 1st Hungarian Armored Division and attached to the Second Army. Similarly, almost all combat-worthy aircraft and supporting units were organized into the 1st Flight Group, also attached to the Second Army. For both the armored and air units, shortages in supplies and equipment caused significant delays, and they were deployed significantly later than infantry units.

On 11 April 1942, the 209,000-man-strong Second Army was assigned to the German Army Group South in Ukraine. Second Army moved to the front from 17 April 1942 to 27 June. During the movement, 19 of the total 822 railway trains were attacked by Soviet partisans, which caused 27 combat deaths and 83 wounded.

In June 1942, Army Group South was divided between Army Group B and Army Group A for Fall Blau, the Axis summer offensive. Second Army was assigned to Army Group B.

=== Voronezh ===
In June and July 1942, prior to the Battle of Stalingrad, the Hungarian Second Army was involved in the Battle of Voronezh as part of Army Group B. Fighting in and around the city of Voronezh on the Don River, the Hungarian troops supported the German Fourth Panzer Army against the defending Soviet Voronezh Front. During these operations, the Hungarian Second Army suffered severe casualties in manpower, as without adequate air and armor support all assaults were carried out by infantry units only, against skillful and determined Soviet defense. Lack of transportation was so severe that some divisions marched over 1,000 km on foot from their disembarkation points to the first contact with the enemy. Artillery support during the offensive was also limited for the same reason, leading to even worse infantry losses.

=== The Don River, Operation Little Saturn, and disaster ===
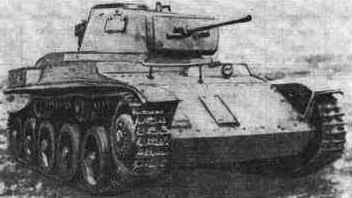
Hungarian Toldi I tank during the 1941 invasion of USSR by the Hungarian Second Army

The Hungarian Second Army is probably the best known Hungarian wartime army due to the part it played in the Battle of Stalingrad. The rank-and-file of Second Army had received only eight weeks of training before being sent to the Eastern Front. The only tactical experience for many of these soldiers were the maneuvers held just prior to the departure for the front. This lack of preparation badly affected the soldiers' fighting abilities and morale when confronted with heavy tank assaults. Also, a significant part of Second Army were reservists (officers and enlisted men alike) who were promised a "quick victory", and became demoralized as their prospects for getting home soon worsened.

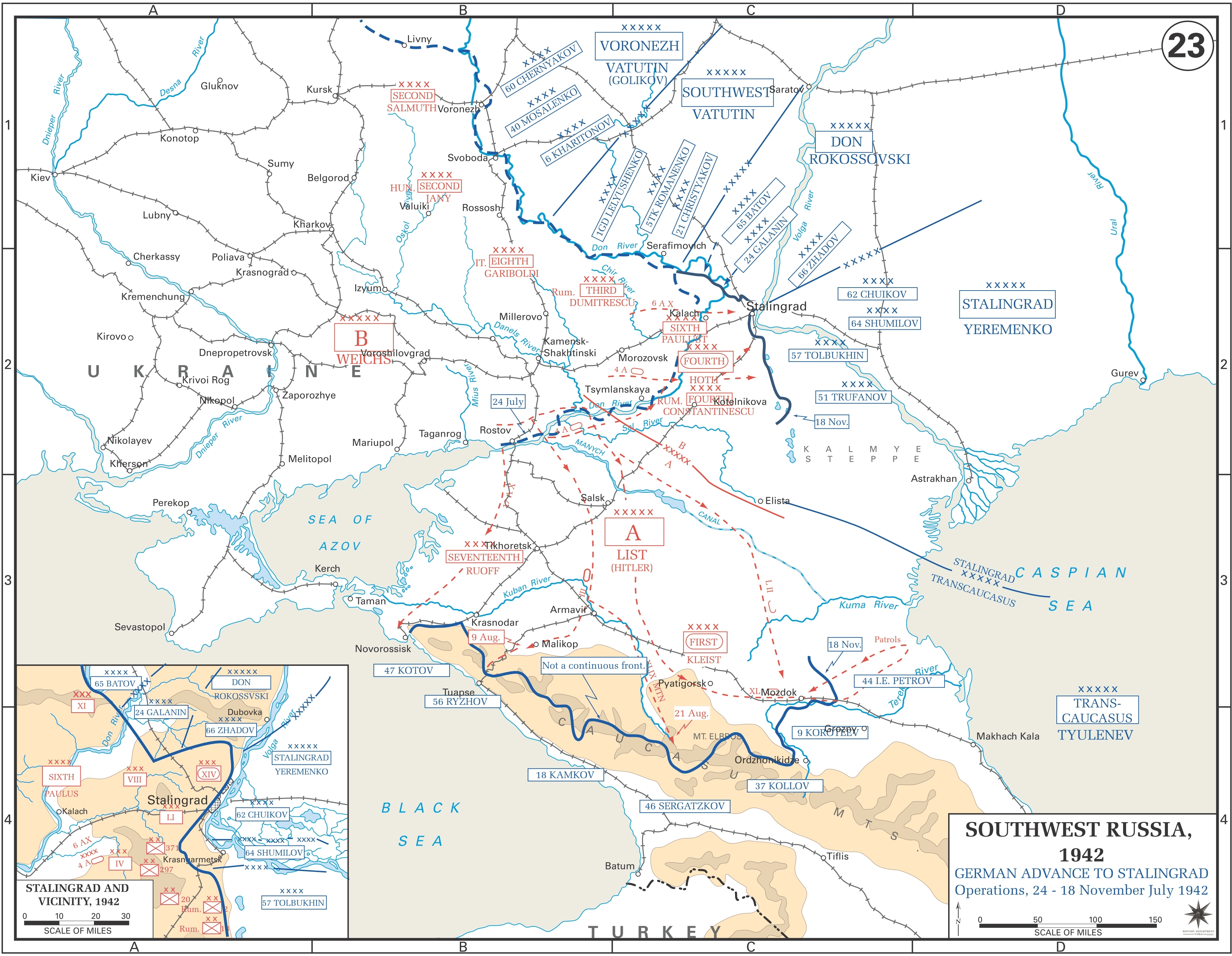
Map showing the Hungarian Second Army near Svoboda on the Don River, in autumn 1942

In fall 1942, the Hungarian Second Army was deployed to protect the Italian Eighth Army's northern flank, between Novaya Pokrovka on the Don River and Rossosh, while German Sixth Army attacked Stalingrad.

As winter set in, and with the worsening German situation around Stalingrad, the Second Army's transportation collapsed, leaving front line units without basic necessities such as food, winter clothing, fuel, and building materials. The cold, hungry, and the demoralized Second Army had to defend even longer and longer stretches of the front line as more and more German units were sent into Stalingrad.

The Second Army, like other armies protecting the flanks of the Sixth Army, was annihilated in the Soviet counter-offensives of the winter of 1942-1943. In Operation Uranus (19 November) Soviet forces drove through the Romanian Third Army and Romanian Fourth Army, trapping the Sixth Army in Stalingrad.

The Germans launched Operation Wintergewitter (12 December) to relieve the Sixth Army. In the first stage of Operation Little Saturn (16 December), the Soviets attacked between the Italian Eighth Army and the Hungarian Second Army, threatening the flank of the Wintergewitter forces.

On 13 January 1943, the Soviets began the Voronezh–Kharkov offensive. The Bryansk Front, Voronezh Front, and Southwestern Front attacked simultaneously. The Soviet attack was totally successful this time: during the Ostrogozhsk–Rossosh Offensive the Soviets rapidly destroyed the Second Army near Svoboda on the Don River. An attack on the German Second Army further north threatened to encircle that army as well, forcing it to retreat. By 5 February, troops of the Voronezh Front were approaching Kharkov. The Hungarian Second Army's losses were made especially severe by the attitude of its commander, Colonel General Vitéz Gusztáv Jány, who forbade any sort of withdrawal, even though the neighboring German and Italian forces had pulled back. Most units of the Second Army were encircled and either annihilated or succumbed to the extreme cold (-30 °C – -40 °C) while trying to escape. The 1st Armored Division was reduced to a single operational tank within a few days, and most of the personnel of the 1st Air Group died on the ground when their airfields were overrun by Soviet tanks.

During its twelve months of activity on the Eastern Front, the Second Army suffered extensive losses. Of an initial force of about 190,000 Hungarian soldiers and 17,000 Jewish forced laborers, about 100,000 were dead, 35,000 wounded, and 60,000 taken prisoners of war. Only about 40,000 men returned to Hungary, scapegoated by Hitler for the catastrophic Axis defeat.

"No nation lost as much blood during World War II in such a short period of time."

The Second Army, like most other Axis armies in Army Group B, thereafter ceased to exist as a meaningful fighting force. The German Sixth Army, encircled in Stalingrad, surrendered on 2 February 1943. The remnants of Second Army returned to Hungary on 24 May 1943.

Most of the field divisions sent to the Eastern Front as part of the Second Army in 1942 were light field divisions (Hungarian infantry divisions typically were composed of three infantry regiments; "light" divisions typically had but two regiments).

In addition to the three infantry corps, the Hungarian Second Army included the 1st Armored Field Division. Most of the armor in this division was included in the 30th Tank Regiment. At the time of the Siege of Stalingrad, the primary battle tank in this unit was the Czechoslovak Panzer 38(t). These were augmented by Hungarian Toldi tanks for scouting duties, Hungarian Nimrod armored self-propelled anti-aircraft guns, and Hungarian Csaba armored cars. The tank regiment also had about ten German Panzer IV/F2 tanks and a few German Panzer III tanks in its heavy tank battalion, though these were too few to have much impact on the regiment's quality.

== Attached to Armeegruppe Fretter-Pico ==
=== Hungary becomes a battlefield ===
Until March 19, 1944, Hungarian Regent Admiral Miklós Horthy surrounded himself with anti-fascists. Relations between Hungary and Germany became more and more difficult. Horthy met Hitler on March 16 and 17 at German headquarters, where he told Hitler, "We Hungarians have already lost one hundred thousand men in this bloody war, counting dead, wounded and missing. Those we have left have but few arms with which to fight. We cannot help you one bit more. We are through. We are doing our best to stave off the Bolshevik menace and we won't be able to spare a single man for the Balkans." The German dictator arranged to keep Horthy busy by conducting negotiations while Hungary was quietly and efficiently overrun by German ground forces in a quick and bloodless invasion, Operation Margarethe.

Soon all of Hungary was to become a battlefield. By mid-August 1944, German Colonel-General (Generaloberst) Johannes Friessner's Army Group South was on the brink of collapse. To the north, the Soviet's Operation Bagration was completing the destruction of the Axis Army Group Centre.

To the south, Germany's former ally, Romania, declared war on Germany on August 25, 1944, as a result of the Yassi-Kishinev strategic offensive (August 20–29, 1944). On the eve of the Soviet East Carpathian strategic offensive (September 8–28, 1944), as Soviet forces crossed the Hungarian border, Bulgaria, too, declared war on Germany. The subsequent Budapest strategic offensive (October 29, 1944 - February 13, 1945) attack by the Ukrainian Second and Third Fronts far into Hungary destroyed any semblance of an organised German defensive line. By this time, Fyodor Tolbukhin's Ukrainian Third Front, aided by the Ukrainian Second Front under Marshal of the Soviet Union Rodion Malinovsky, had annihilated thirteen Axis divisions, capturing over 100,000 men.

=== Wartime mobilization ===
On August 30, 1944, Hungary mobilized a reformed Hungarian Second Army and the Hungarian Third Army. Both armies were primarily composed of weak, undermanned, and underequipped reserve divisions.

General of Artillery Maximilian Fretter-Pico's recently reformed German Sixth Army represented the nucleus of what remained of Friessner's force. By October 1944, seeing that his Hungarian allies were suffering from low morale, Friessner attached the recently reformed Hungarian Second Army under the command of Lieutenant-General Lajos Veress von Dalnoki to Fretter-Pico's army. The combination of German and Hungarian armies was designated Army Group Fretter-Pico (Armeegruppe Fretter-Pico).

The desertions of Bulgaria and Romania had opened a 650-kilometer gap in Friessner's Army Group South. As Friessner desperately struggled to reform a defensive line, news filtered through to Berlin that the Hungarian leader, Admiral Miklós Horthy was preparing to sign a separate peace with the Soviet Union. If this happened, the entire front of Army Group South Ukraine would collapse.

In August, Horthy replaced Prime Minister Döme Sztójay with the anti-fascist General Géza Lakatos. Under Lakatos's regime, acting Interior Minister Béla Horváth ordered Hungarian gendarmes to protect any Hungarian citizen from being deported.

On October 15, 1944, Horthy announced that Hungary had signed an armistice with the Soviet Union. But most Hungarian army units ignored Horthy's orders, and the Germans reacted swiftly with Operation Panzerfaust. Commando leader Otto Skorzeny was sent to Hungary and, in another of his daring "snatch" operations, kidnapped Horthy's son, Miklós Horthy Jr. The Germans insisted that Horthy abrogate the armistice, depose Lakatos's government, and name the leader of the Arrow Cross Party, Ferenc Szálasi, as Prime Minister. Instead, Horthy agreed to abdicate. Szálasi was able take power in Hungary with Germany's backing.

=== Success at the Battle of Debrecen and the end ===
Late in 1944, a reformed Hungarian Second Army enjoyed a modest level of combat success as an integral part of German General Maximilian Fretter-Pico's Army Group Fretter-Pico. From September 16 - October 24, 1944, during the Battle of Debrecen, Army Group Fretter-Pico achieved a major success against the Debrecen Offensive Operation. While avoiding encirclement, Army Group Fretter-Pico managed to maul three Soviet corps under the command of Issa Pliyev. The defeat of the Soviet cavalry-mechanised by the combined German and Hungarian forces contrasted with Pliyev's earlier victory over the Hungarian Third Army. However, the victory ultimately proved too costly to the Hungarians' armor and ammunition reserves. Unable to replace equipment and personnel lost in the Battle of Debrecen, the Hungarian Second Army were smashed on December 1, 1944. Surviving units of the Second Army were transferred to the Third Army.

By 1944, the main battle tank of the Second Armored Field Division was the Hungarian Turan medium tank, a limited improvement over the Czech Panzer 38(t) and the Hungarian Toldi tanks used by the First Armored Field Division in 1942. However, the Turan I tank (with a 40 mm gun) and the Turan II tank (with a short 75 mm gun) were still no match for a standard Soviet T-34 tank, and, compared to the T-34/76, the Soviets had many much-improved T-34/85 tanks by 1944. Manufacture of the potentially more effective Turan III tank (with a long 75 mm gun) never developed beyond prototypes. Only a few of the better quality German Panzer IV tanks, Panzer III tanks, and Sturmgeschütz III assault guns were made available to the Hungarians.

== See also ==
- Hungary
- History of Hungary
- Hungary during the Second World War
- Military of Hungary - 1940/45
- Battle of Voronezh - 1942
- Battle of Stalingrad - 1942/43
- Battle of Debrecen - 1944
- Eastern Front (World War II)
- Hungarian First Army
- Hungarian Third Army
- Gyorshadtest
- Szent László Infantry Division
- Gusztáv Jány

== Commanders ==
The Hungarian Second Army had four commanders from March 1, 1940 - November 13, 1944:

No.	Portrait	Commander	Took office	Left office	Time in office
1	Gusztáv Jány	Colonel General; Gusztáv Jány (1883–1947)	1 March 1940	5 August 1943	3 years, 157 days
2	Géza Lakatos	Colonel General; Géza Lakatos (1890–1967)	5 August 1943	1 April 1944	240 days
3	Lajos Veress	Lieutenant General; Lajos Veress (1889–1976)	1 April 1944	16 October 1944	198 days
4	Jenő Major	Lieutenant General; Jenő Major (1888–1962)	16 October 1944	13 November 1944	28 days

== Sources ==
- Mollo, Andrew (1987). The Armed Forces of World War II: Uniforms, Insignia, and Organization. New York: Crown Publishers. p. 312. ISBN 0-517-54478-4.
- Thomas, Dr. Nigel, and, Szabo, Laszlo Pal (2008). The Royal Hungarian Army in World war II. New York: Osprey Publishing. p. 48. ISBN 978-1-84603-324-7.
- Hungarian-language Wikipedia page on the 2nd Army
