= Voronezh, Altai Krai =

Voronezh Воронеж
- Settlement
- Location within Altai Krai Location within Russia
- Coordinates: 51°11′N 82°00′E
- Country: Russia
- Region: Altai Krai
- District: Zmeinogorsky District
- Time zone: UTC+7:00

Voronezh (Russian: Воронеж) is a rural locality (a settlement) in Karamyshevsky Selsoviet, Zmeinogorsky District, Altai Krai, Russia. The population was 202 as of 2013. There are 4 streets.

== Geography ==
Voronezh is located 14 km northwest of Zmeinogorsk (the district's administrative centre) by road. Karamyshevo is the nearest rural locality.
