= Filipp Golikov =

Soviet marshal (1900–1980)

Filipp Ivanovich Golikov
- Филипп Иванович Голиков
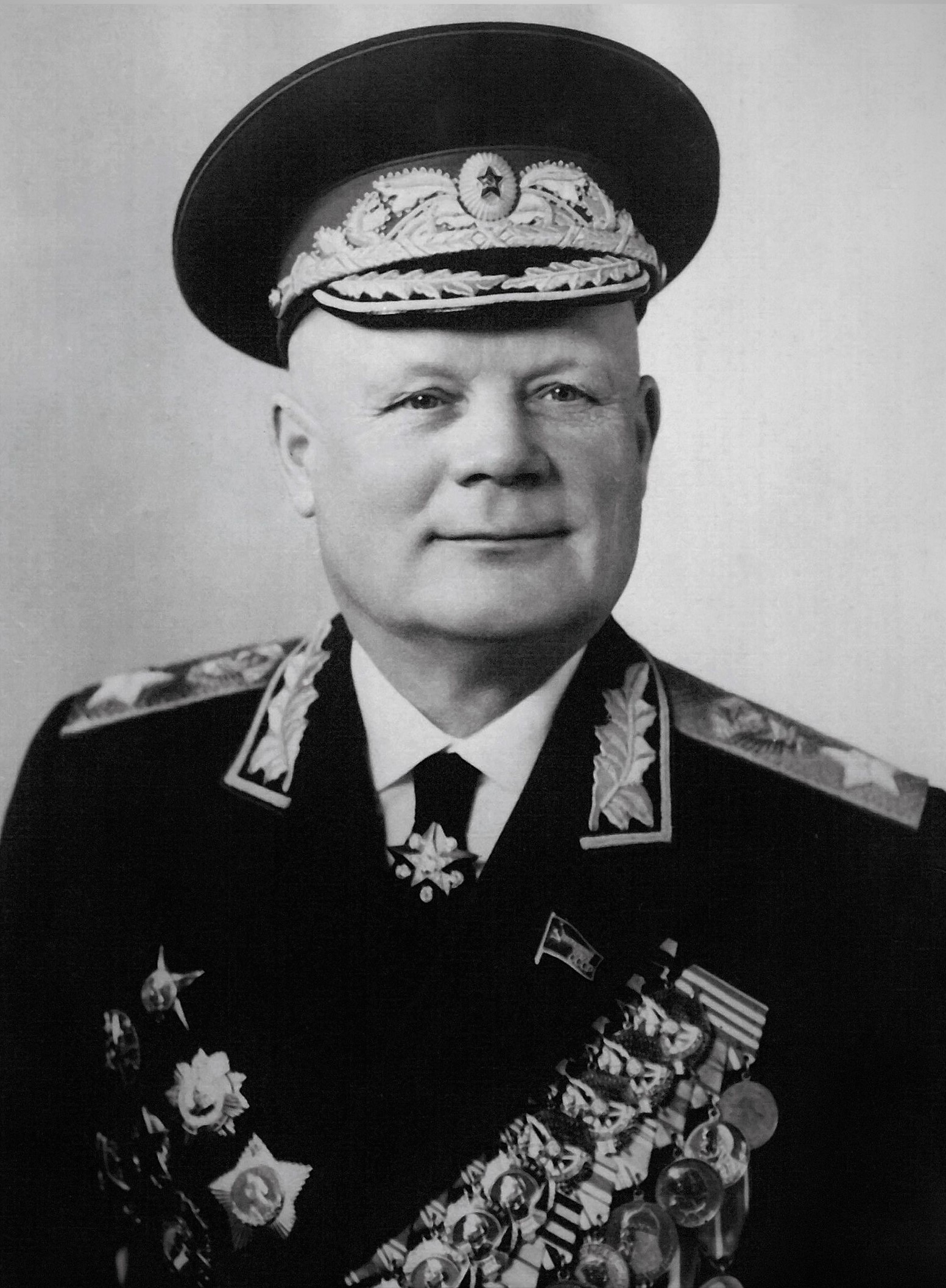
- Golikov in the 1960s
- Born: 2 July [O.S. 19 June] 1900; Borisova, Kamyshlovsky Uyezd, Perm Governorate, Russian Empire (now Kataysky District, Kurgan Oblast, Russia)
- Died: 29 July 1980 (aged 80); Moscow, Russian SFSR, Soviet Union
- Burial place: Novodevichy Cemetery, Moscow
- Military career
- Allegiance: Soviet Union
- Branch: Soviet Army, Main Intelligence Directorate
- Service years: 1918–1980
- Rank: Marshal of the Soviet Union
- Commands: 6th Army; 10th Army; 4th Shock Army; Bryansk Front; 1st Guards Army; Voronezh Front
- Conflicts: World War II; Battle of Lwów; Battle of Voronezh; Ostrogozhsk–Rossosh Offensive; Voronezh–Kastornoye operation; Operation Star; Third Battle of Kharkov; Repatriation of Soviet citizens after World War II
- Awards: See Honours and awards

Filipp Ivanovich Golikov (Russian: Филипп Иванович Голиков; 2 July [O.S. 19 June] 1900 – 29 July 1980) was a Soviet military commander. As chief of the GRU (Main Intelligence Directorate), he is best known for failing to take seriously the abundant intelligence about Nazi Germany's plans for an invasion of the Soviet Union in June 1941, either because he did not believe them or because Joseph Stalin did not want to hear them.

From 1944, Golikov was in charge of the repatriation of Soviet citizens during and after World War II as head of the Directorate for Repatriation under the Council of Ministers of the USSR. Golikov was promoted to the rank of Marshal of the Soviet Union in 1961.

== Early career ==
Golikov was born into a peasant family of Russian ethnicity in Borisova, in the Perm Governorate of the Russian Empire. His father, Ivan Nikolaevich Golikov, served as a medical orderly with the garrison in Tobolsk. Father and son both joined the Russian Communist Party (Bolsheviks) in April 1918. A month later, Golikov enlisted in the Red Army as a volunteer. He was a political commissar through most of the Russian Civil War, and for 11 years afterwards. He graduated from the M. V. Frunze Military Academy in 1933. He was appointed commander of a regiment in 1931, and in 1938, during the Great Purge he was suddenly promoted to membership of the Military Council of the Byelorussian Military District. He was apparently sent there to supervise a purge of Red Army commanders in the district, including the future war hero Georgy Zhukov, who never forgave him. Later in 1938, he was abruptly removed, and in November 1938, was made commander of the Vinnitsa Army Group, and, in 1939, of the 6th Army. During the Soviet invasion of Poland in 1939, he was in charge of overrunning and occupying Lvov, and in 1940 he served in the Winter War against Finland.

== Head of Military Intelligence ==
In July 1940, Golikov was appointed head of Main Intelligence Directorate (GRU), despite having no previous experience of intelligence gathering. Stalin evidently knew that he was ill-qualified: during the 18th party conference the following February, he said of Golikov "as an intelligence agent, he is inexperienced, naive: an intelligence agent ought to be like the devil, believing no one, not even himself." Five of Golikov's predecessors had been or were about to be shot; his immediate predecessor, Ivan Proskurov had been held responsible for the fiasco of the Finnish War, though it is more likely that he was sacked for being too outspoken about the poor state of preparedness of the Soviet military. Golikov therefore had a powerful incentive to tell Stalin only what he wanted to hear, and Stalin refused to believe that Hitler would break the non-aggression pact they had negotiated in 1939. From early 1941, Soviet intelligence was receiving multiple warnings from within Germany, and from the British and American officials of the risk of a German invasion. On 20 March, Golikov signed a widely distributed assessment of all the current intelligence, which began with the observation: "The majority of agent reports concerning the possibility of war with the USSR in the spring of 1941 come from Anglo-American sources, the goal of which at present is without a doubt to worsen relations between the USSR and Germany." As late as May, even though he knew and had told his superiors that the number of German divisions on the USSR border had been increased from 70 to 107, Golikov forecast that Germany's next military operations would be against the UK, in Gibraltar, North Africa and the Near East.

In April–June 1941, Golikov reported on the continued concentration of German troops near the Soviet western border, the number of divisions drawn to it, their combat strength and numbers, their locations, called the date of the attack on the USSR — 22 June 1941 (this date was indicated by about 15 reliable sources). From July 1940 to June 1941, the GRU of the General Staff of the Red Army sent 95 (only declassified) messages to the leadership of the USSR about the concentration of German troops.

== War record ==
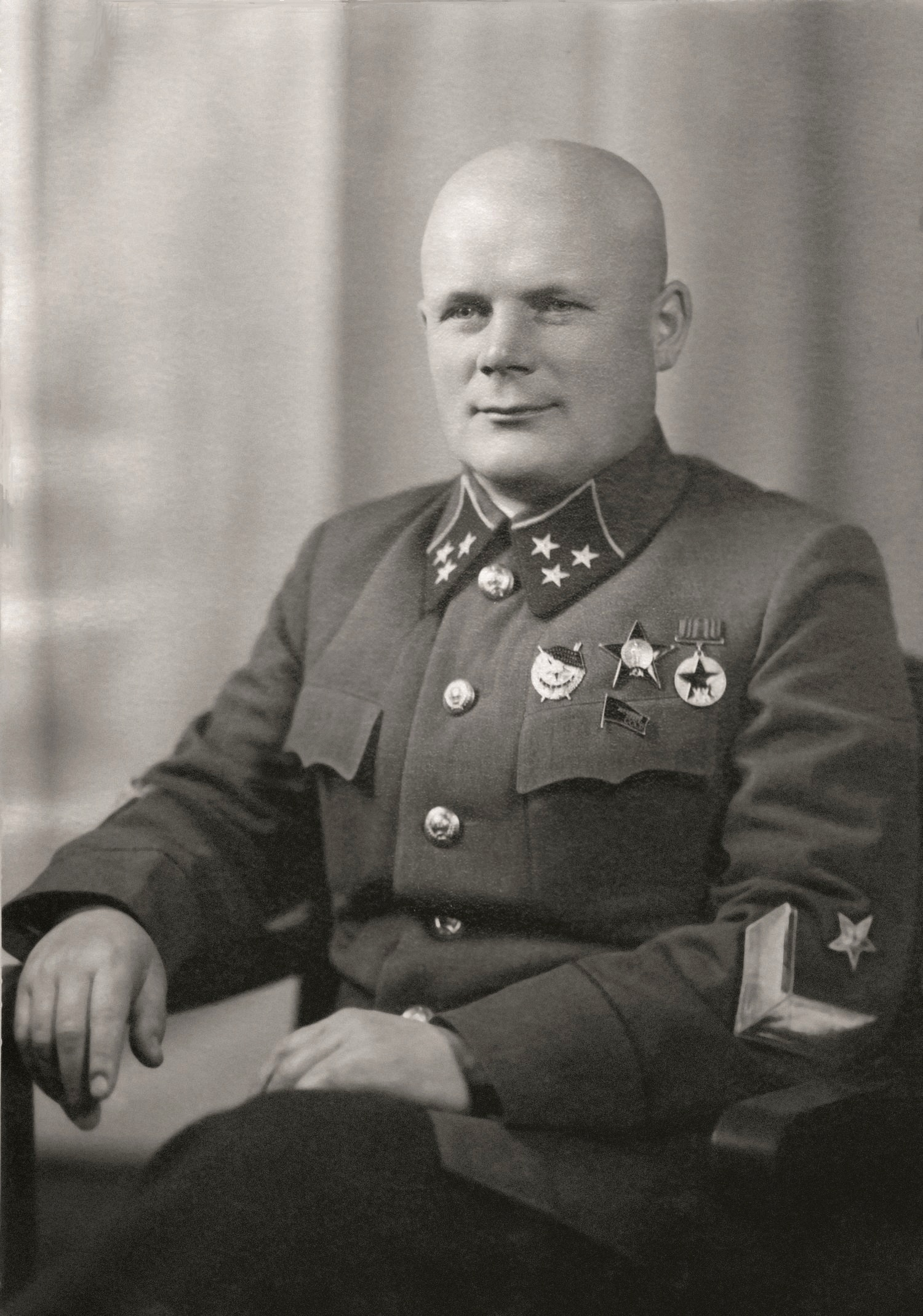
Golikov in 1941

Despite his record, Golikov was retained as head of the GRU until October 1941. He led a mission to London on 8–13 July, and to Washington on 26 July. In 1942, he commanded the Bryansk Front, then at the start of the battle of Stalingrad, he was appointed deputy commander under General Andrey Yeryomenko. When it was decided to move the command headquarters to comparative safety on the East bank of the Volga, Golikov was ordered to stay behind in the city. According to Nikita Khrushchev, the front's political commissar: "A look of terror came over Golikov's face...I never saw anyone, soldier or civilian, in such a state during the whole war. He was white as a sheet and begged me not to abandon him. He kept saying over and over, 'Stalingrad is doomed'.". He was recalled to Moscow, where he complained to Stalin about the way Khrushchev and Yeryomenko had treated him. Stalin accepted his version, and appointed him commander of the Voronezh Front in October 1942. He led the counterattack that recaptured Voronezh on 26 January 1943, and Kharkov on 16 February, but after Kharkov was retaken by the Germans, in March 1943, Marshal Zhukov insisted that Golikov be dismissed. For the remainder of the war, until 1950, he was head of the Chief Personnel Directorate of the Soviet Ministry of Defence.

== Directorate for Repatriation ==
In October 1944, Golikov was also appointed head of the Directorate for Repatriation under the Council of Ministers of the USSR. In this capacity he oversaw the program of the repatriation of Soviet citizens during and after World War II. The agency was established with the initial staff of 200 located in Moscow, plus 320 officers within the occupation troops. It coordinated with the frontline and rear services of the armed forces, transportation ministry, and regional and local governments, and managed the transit infrastructure. Its departments included transportation and logistics; registration; medical services; finance; propaganda; and others. In February 1945, a unit managing the repatriation of Allied nationals was added. The agency liaised with Allied forces and local authorities to ensure smooth execution of the program. SMERSH and NKVD managed verification and filtration of repatriated citizens.

At the height of the activities from July to October 1945, the Soviet repatriation effort required the work of over 50,000 personnel dedicated to the resettlement effort. To deal with the flood of repatriates, these employees were temporarily augmented by another 50,000 workers on the regional and local levels to manage their reception. Considering the contributions of other ministries, the combined effort involved about 140,000 to 150,000 personnel.

Declassified archives disprove Cold War era claims of immediate, widespread persecution of the returnees. 58% of repatriates were cleared to return home, while officials drafted 33.5% into the Red Army or labor battalions and transferred 6.5% to NKVD filtration camps. Rank-and-file collaborators were processed administratively and sent into exile to special settlements; courts sentenced officers or high-ranking civilian collaborators to the Gulag. Many returnees faced life-long social stigma.

== Later career ==
After the war, Golikov held a succession of mainly political posts at the Soviet Ministry of Defence. In 1946, Stalin began to resent the praise heaped on Marshal Zhukov as the architect of victory, so Golikov presented a detailed case against the Marshal at a special session of the Military Council, in June. Zhukov was publicly humiliated and relegated to a minor military post. In 1949–50, Golikov contributed to the Leningrad affair, the virulent purge of the Leningrad party leadership, by engineering the dismissal of the head of the Main Political Administration of the Armed Forces, Iosif Shikin. In 1950, he was given command of a mechanised army, and in 1956 was appointed head of the Military Academy of Armoured Troops. In January 1958, he benefited from the second fall of Marshal Zhukov, by being appointed head of the Main Political Administration of the Armed Forces, his job being to ensure that the military stayed under communist party control. He was abruptly dismissed in April 1962, officially for health reasons, though the real reason may be that he opposed Khrushchev's decision to ship nuclear missiles to Cuba. Afterwards, he was appointed Inspector General of the USSR Ministry of Defence.

Golikov died on 29 July 1980 in Moscow, and was buried at Novodevichy Cemetery.

== Honours and awards ==
USSR

| Order of Lenin | Order of Lenin, four times (1941, 1945, 1950, 1960) |
| Order of the October Revolution | Order of the October Revolution (1968) |
| Order of the Red Banner | Order of the Red Banner, four times (1933, 1942, 1944, 1949) |
| | Order of Suvorov, 1st сlass (1943) |
| | Order of Kutuzov, 1st class (1944) |
| Order of the Red Banner of Labour | Order of the Red Banner of Labour (1980) |
| | Order of the Red Star, twice (1936, 1970) |
| | Order for Service to the Homeland in the Armed Forces of the USSR, 3rd class (1975) |
| | Jubilee Medal "XX Years of the Workers' and Peasants' Red Army" (1938) |
| | Jubilee Medal "In Commemoration of the 100th Anniversary of the Birth of Vladimir Ilyich Lenin" (1969) |
| | Medal "For the Defence of Moscow" (1944) |
| Medal "For the Defence of Stalingrad" | Medal "For the Defence of Stalingrad" (1942) |
| Medal "For the Victory over Germany in the Great Patriotic War 1941–1945" | Medal "For the Victory over Germany in the Great Patriotic War 1941–1945" (1945) |
| | Jubilee Medal "Twenty Years of Victory in the Great Patriotic War 1941-1945" (1965) |
| | Jubilee Medal "Thirty Years of Victory in the Great Patriotic War 1941–1945" (1975) |
| | Medal "For the Victory over Japan" (1945) |
| | Medal "Veteran of the Armed Forces of the USSR" (1976) |
| | Medal "For Strengthening of Brotherhood in Arms" (1980) |
| | Jubilee Medal "30 Years of the Soviet Army and Navy" (1948) |
| | Jubilee Medal "40 Years of the Armed Forces of the USSR" (1958) |
| | Jubilee Medal "50 Years of the Armed Forces of the USSR" (1968) |
| | Jubilee Medal "60 Years of the Armed Forces of the USSR" (1978) |
| | Medal "In Commemoration of the 800th Anniversary of Moscow" (1947) |
| | Honorary weapon – shashka inscribed with golden national emblem of the Soviet Union (1968) |

Foreign

| Order of 9 September 1944, 2nd class (People's Republic of Bulgaria, 1971) |
| Order of the White Lion, 1st class (Czechoslovakia, 1947) |
| War Cross 1939–1945 (Czechoslovakia, 1943) |
| Medal "In Commemoration of the Battle of Dukla Pass" (Czechoslovakia) |
| Gold Medal Brotherhood in Arms (East Germany) |
| Order of the National Flag, 1st class (North Korea) |
| Medal for the Liberation of Korea (North Korea) |
| Order of the Polar Star (Mongolian People's Republic, 1947) |
| Order of the Red Banner (Mongolian People's Republic, 1945, 1971) |
| Medal "For the Victory over Japan" (Mongolian People's Republic) |
| Medal "30 years of the Victory in Khalkhin-Gol" (Mongolian People's Republic) |
| Medal "30 years of Victory over militaristic Japan" (Mongolian People's Republic) |
| Medal "50 Years of the Mongolian People's Revolution" (Mongolian People's Republic) |
| Medal "50 years of the Mongolian People's Army" (Mongolian People's Republic) |
| Cross of Grunwald, 1st class (Poland, 1946) |
| Order of the Star of the Romanian Socialist Republic, 1st class (Romania, 1947) |
| Medal "liberation from the fascist yoke" (Romania) |
| Order of the Partisan Star, 1st class (Yugoslavia, 1946) |
| Order of Merits for the People, 1st class (Yugoslavia, 1946) |
