= Army Group B =

- Heeresgruppe B
- Active: 12 October 1939 – 22 June 1941; 9 July 1942 – 9 February 1943; 19 July – 26 November 1943; 26 November 1943 – 17 April 1945
- Country: Germany; Hungary (Eastern Front only); Romania (Eastern Front only); Italy (Eastern Front only)
- Allegiance: Germany
- Branch: Heer ( Wehrmacht)
- Engagements: Phony War; Battle of France; Invasion of the Netherlands; Invasion of Belgium; Case Red; German-occupied France; German-occupied Poland; Eastern Front; Battle of Stalingrad; Operation Uranus; Voronezh–Kharkov offensive; German-occupied Italy; Italian Front; German-occupied France; Western Front; Operation Overlord; Falaise pocket; Operation Market Garden; Battle of the Bulge; Ruhr pocket

Commanders
- Commanders: Fedor von Bock; Maximilian von Weichs; Erwin Rommel; Günther von Kluge; Walter Model

Army Group B (German: Heeresgruppe B) was the name of four distinct German army group commands that saw action during World War II.

The first Army Group B was created on 12 October 1939 (from the former Army Group North) and fought in the Battle of France on the northern flank. It was responsible for a part of the German invasion of Belgium and the majority of the German invasion of the Netherlands. In the later stage of that campaign ("Case Red"), it again advanced on the German right flank towards the Somme river, the city of Paris and the Franco-Spanish border. After 16 August 1940, it was deployed to East Prussia and to the General Government in German-occupied Poland. When Operation Barbarossa began on 22 June 1941, Army Group B was renamed on the same day to become "Army Group Center".

The second Army Group B came into existence on 9 July 1942, when Army Group South was split into two army groups, named Army Group A and Army Group B. Army Group B was responsible for the northern flank of the German 1942 summer offensive towards the Volga river and the Caucasian oilfields. Its most famous operational target was the major city of Stalingrad. Beginning on 21 November 1942, the army group had its lines repeatedly pierced by Red Army counterattacks ("Operation Uranus"), developing into the encirclement crisis during the Battle of Stalingrad that ended with the destruction of the German 6th Army trapped in the city. Army Group B was organizationally weakened by the creation of Army Group Don, which was inserted into the line between Army Groups A and B to alleviate the crisis at Stalingrad. After additional pressure was applied to the army group by the Soviet Voronezh–Kharkov offensive (January – March 1943), the army group was dissolved on 9 February 1943 and its subordinate formations divided between Army Group Center and the newly-reestablished Army Group South (formerly Army Group Don).

The third Army Group B was formed on 19 July 1943 using former Army Group B personnel as well as Task Force Rommel (German: Arbeitsstab Rommel) and deployed to northern Italy. Here, the staff was used on 26 November 1943 to create OB Südwest ("Army Group C").

On the same day, 26 November 1943, another Army Group B command was created at the coast of the English Channel in German-occupied France. After the Allied Normandy landings in June 1944, Army Group B initially commanded the northern wing of the new Western Front. After Army Group H was created in the German-occupied Netherlands in November 1944, Army Group B instead took the center of the Western Front, located between Army Group H to the north and Army Group G to the south. It is notable on the Western Front as the army group to oversee the German Ardennes Offensive ("Battle of the Bulge"). Eventually, Army Group B surrendered on 17 April 1945 in the Ruhr pocket.

== First deployment (1939–41) ==
Army Group B was initially created on 12 October 1939, when the former Army Group North, which had participated in the Invasion of Poland, was renamed. The initial commander of the army group was Fedor von Bock, who had already held the command over Army Group North during the campaign in Poland.

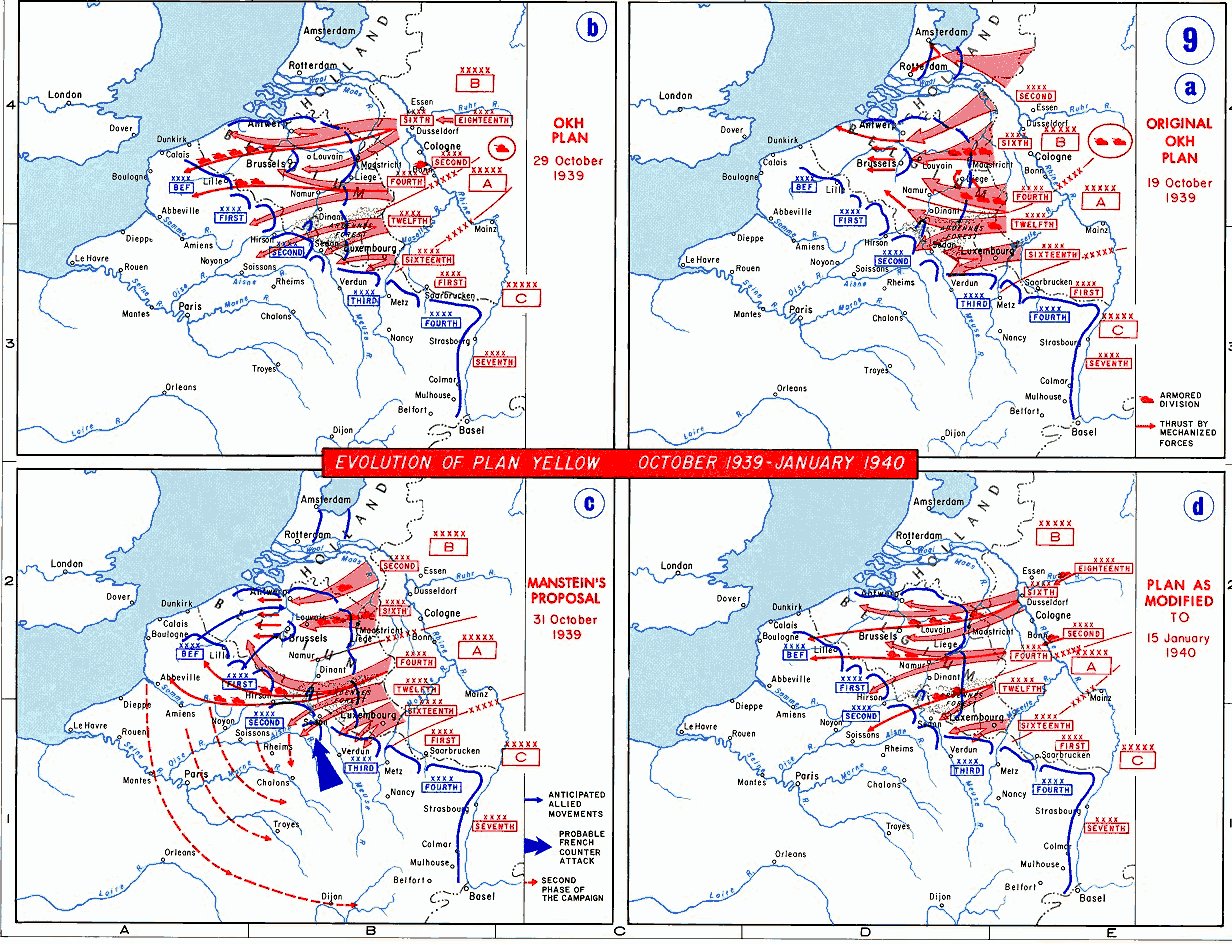
The plan for the Battle of France evolved from 1939 to 1940 to shift the operational focus away from Army Group B to Army Group A.

Army Group B was assembled during the period of the Phoney War in the Lower Rhine area, along the German-Dutch border and the German-Belgian border. In the initial OKH draft for the attack against France, Army Group B was assigned the Schwerpunkt role, but the intervention by senior officers (notably Erich von Manstein) from its southern neighbor, Army Group A, resulted in a shift in the German planning starting in January to February 1940. Army Group A was now accorded the operational focus, and Army Group B became a formation with a support and auxiliary role. With 29 1/3 divisions, it was clearly smaller than its southern neighbor with 44 1/3 divisions (whereas Army Group C in the far south on the French border received only 17 divisions). Army Group A also received preferential treatment in terms of access to reserve formations. Whereas Army Group A received seven armored divisions and three motorized infantry divisions, Army Group B was significantly weaker at three each.

The army group participated in the German invasion of the Netherlands and the German invasion of Belgium. In the second part of that campaign ("Case Red"), Army Group B again found itself on the right-hand flank of the German forces and advanced towards the Somme river and to the French Atlantic coast.

After the successful conclusion of the Western campaign, the army group initially remained on occupation duty in German-occupied France, but was redeployed to German-occupied Poland starting on 16 August 1940, where it took charge of German forces in East Prussia and the General Government, in proximity to the demarcation line with the Soviet Union.

On the day Germany invaded the Soviet Union ("Operation Barbarossa"), 22 June 1941, Army Group B was renamed "Army Group Center".

== Second deployment (1942–43) ==
On 9 July 1942, the previous Army Group South was split in two, resulting in the creation of a new Army Group A as well as the creation of a new Army Group B. Whereas Army Group A was led by a new army group command that had been covertly prepared behind the lines (as "Staff Anton"), Army Group B remained in charge of the previous Army Group South's command formation.

Army Group B advanced northeastwards (whereas Army Group A moved south into the Battle of the Caucasus) to approach the Don and Volga rivers, with particular goals at the Soviet cities of Stalingrad and Astrakhan. After the forward formations of the army group got themselves entangled in the Battle of Stalingrad, a Soviet counterthrust ("Operation Uranus") left the German 6th Army encircled inside the city, on the Volga west bank. Several major formations (German 6th Army, Romanian 4th Army, German 4th Panzer Army) were transferred away from Army Group B and attached to the newly-formed Army Group Don in November 1942. After another Soviet breakthrough on the Don river on 14 January 1943 (Voronezh–Kharkov offensive), Army Group B was pulled out of the line on 9 February 1943. Its remnant subordinate formations were distributed either to the Army Group Center or to the new Army Group South (previously Army Group Don).

== Third deployment (1943) ==
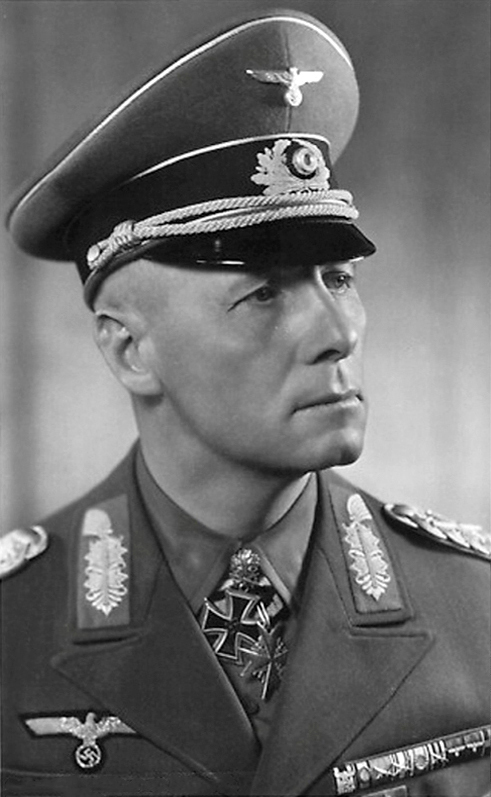
Rommel was commander of Army Group B from 14 July 1943 until 19 July 1944

After Army Group B was pulled out of the Eastern Front, its remaining staff elements were combined on 19 July 1943 with another staff, Task Force Rommel (German: Arbeitsstab Rommel), named after its leading officer Erwin Rommel (whose Army Group Afrika had recently been decisively defeated with the ends of the Tunisian campaign). Rommel on the same 19 July became the commander of Army Group B.

The army group was deployed to northern Italy, where much of its staff was restructured into Army Group C ("Supreme Commander South West") on 26 November 1943.

== Fourth deployment (1943–45) ==
On the same day that the staff of Army Group B was dissolved in Italy (26 November 1943), an army group high command by the same name was created in German-occupied France.

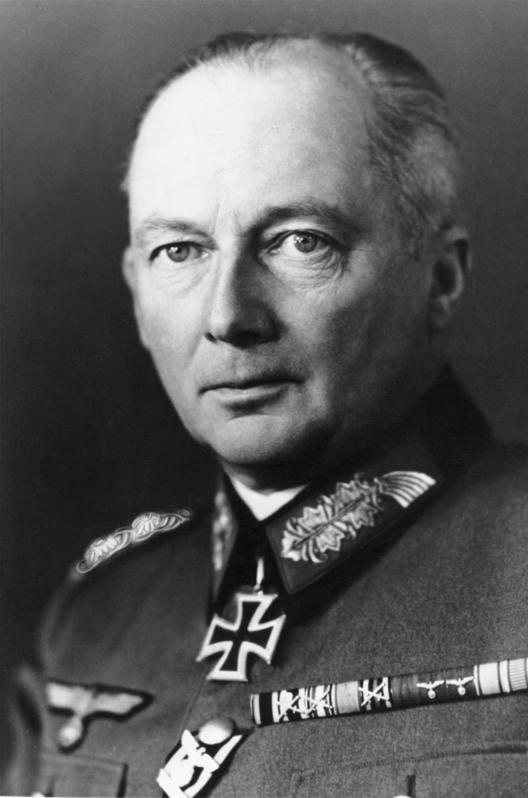
Günther von Kluge

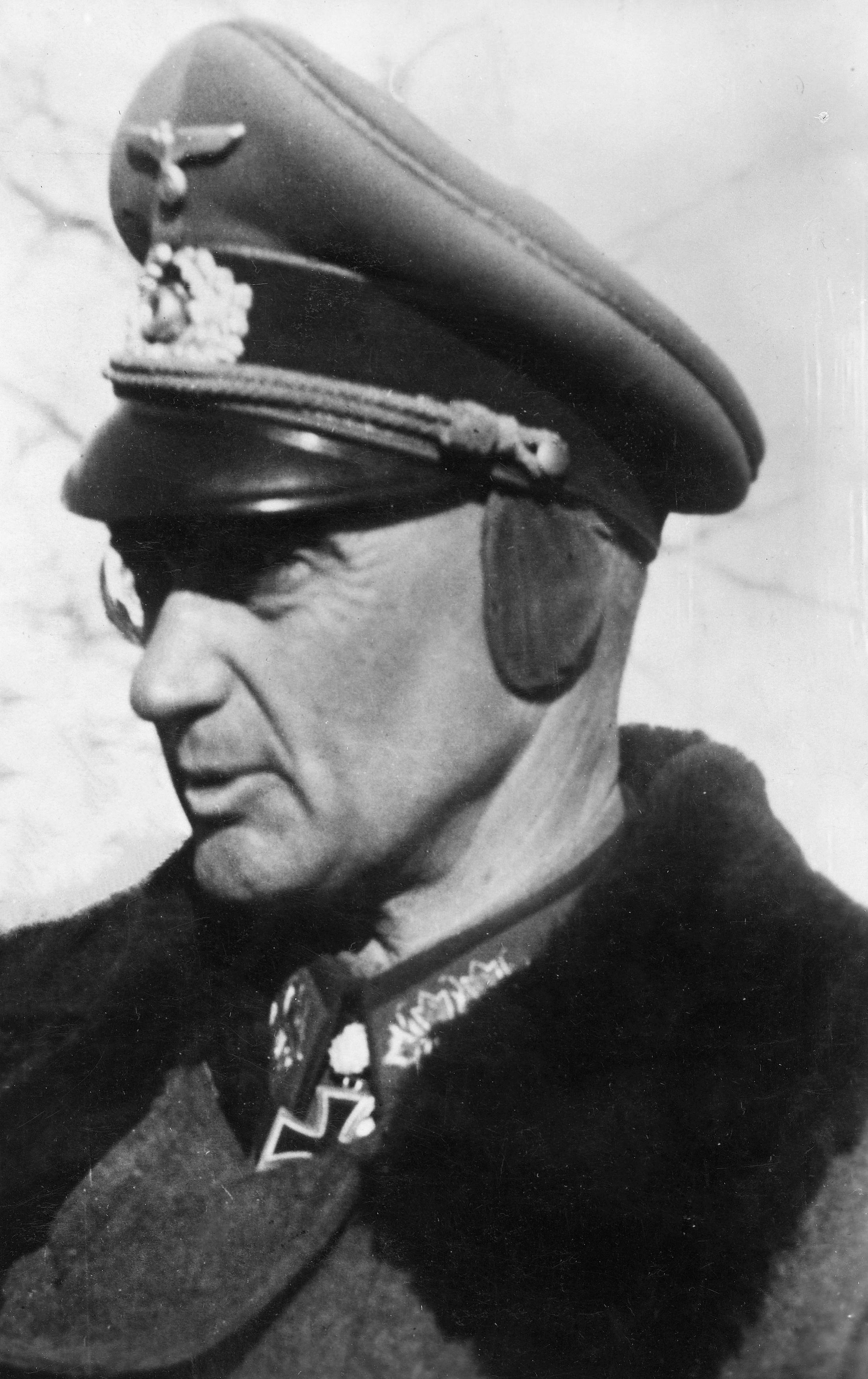
Walter Model

After the Western Allies' Normandy landings (6 June 1944), Army Group B became the northern army group in the German line on the Western Front. Günther von Kluge assumed command of the army group on 19 July 1944, but was soon replaced by Walter Model on 17 August. Moving to the Low Countries, Model with his HQ located at Oosterbeek close to Arnhem, was surprised on 17 September by the start of Operation Market Garden. The army group also participated in the Battle of the Bulge.

Army Group B was isolated in the Ruhr Pocket in northern Germany, and after being divided up into smaller and smaller sections, the final section surrendered to the Allies on 21 April 1945. Model committed suicide the same day.

== Commanders ==
Commanders

- Generalfeldmarschall Fedor von Bock (3 October 1939 – 1 April 1941)
- Generalfeldmarschall Maximilian von Weichs (15 July 1942 – 10 July 1943)
- Generalfeldmarschall Erwin Rommel (10 July 1943 – 17 July 1944)
- Generalfeldmarschall Günther von Kluge (17 July 1944 – 15 August 1944)
- SS-Oberst-Gruppenführer Paul Hausser (15 August 1944 – 17 August 1944)
- Generalfeldmarschall Walter Model (17 August 1944 – 17 April 1945)

Chief of Staff

- General der Infanterie Hans von Salmuth (3 October 1939 – 1 April 1941)
- General der Infanterie Georg von Sodenstern (15 July 1942 – 19 July 1943)
- Generalleutnant Alfred Gause (19 July 1943 – 15 April 1944)
- Generalleutnant Hans Speidel ( 15 April 1944 – 1 September 1944)
- General der Infanterie Hans Krebs (1 September 1944 – 17 February 1945)
- Generalmajor Carl Wagener (20 February 1945 – 17 April 1945)

== Subordinate formations ==
Subordinate formations of Army Group B
| Date | Subordinated commands |
First deployment, 1939–41
| November 1939 | 4th Army, 6th Army, 18th Army |
| May 1940 | 6th Army, 18th Army |
| June 1940 | 9th Army, 6th Army, 4th Army, Panzer Group Kleist |
| July 1940 | 7th Army, 4th Army |
| August 1940 | 7th Army, 4th Army, 6th Army |
| September 1940 | 18th Army, 4th Army, 6th Army |
| January 1941 | 18th Army, 4th Army, 17th Army, 2nd Panzer Group, Military commander in the General Government |
| May 1941 | 9th Army, 4th Army |
Second deployment, 1942–43
| August 1942 | 2nd Army, Hungarian 2nd Army, Italian 8th Army, XXIX Army Corps, 6th Army, 4th Panzer Army |
| September 1942 | 2nd Army, Hungarian 2nd Army, Italian 8th Army, 6th Army, 4th Panzer Army |
| October 1942 | 2nd Army, Hungarian 2nd Army, Italian 8th Army, 4th Panzer Army, Romanian 3rd Army, Romanian 4th Army |
| November 1942 | 2nd Army, Hungarian 2nd Army, Italian 8th Army, 4th Panzer Army, 6th Army, Romanian 3rd Army, Romanian 4th Army |
| December 1942 | 2nd Army, Hungarian 2nd Army, Italian 8th Army |
| January 1943 | 2nd Army, Hungarian 2nd Army, Italian 8th Army, Army Detachment Fretter-Pico |
| February 1943 | 2nd Army, Hungarian 2nd Army, Italian 8th Army, Army Detachment Lanz |
Third deployment, 1943
| September 1943 | LI Army Corps, II SS Corps, LXXXVII Army Corps |
Fourth deployment, 1943–45
| December 1943 | OKW reserves in German-occupied Denmark |
| May 1944 | 7th Army, 15th Army, Wehrmacht commander in the Netherlands |
| June 1944 | 7th Army, 15th Army, Wehrmacht commander in the Netherlands, Panzer Group West |
| August 1944 | 1st Army, 5th Panzer Army, 7th Army, 15th Army, Wehrmacht commander in the Netherlands |
| September 1944 | 7th Army, 1st Parachute Army, 15th Army |
| November 1944 | 7th Army, 5th Panzer Army, Army Group Student (1st Parachute Army + 15th Army) |
| December 1944 | 7th Army, 5th Panzer Army, 6th Panzer Army |
| January 1945 | 7th Army, 5th Panzer Army, 6th Panzer Army, 15th Army |
| February 1945 | 7th Army, 5th Panzer Army, 15th Army |
| April 1945 | 15th Army, 5th Panzer Army, Army Detachment von Lüttwitz |
