= Gusztáv Jány =

Hungarian military officer

Gusztáv Vitéz Jány
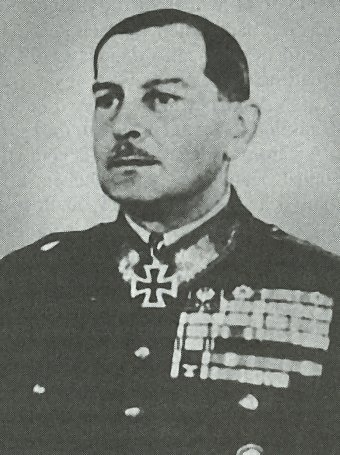
- Born: 21 October 1883; Rajka, Austria-Hungary
- Died: 26 November 1947 (aged 64); Budapest, Second Hungarian Republic
- Cause of death: Executed by firing squad
- Military career
- Allegiance: Austria-Hungary (1905–1918); Kingdom of Hungary (1920–1943)
- Branch: Austro-Hungarian Army; Royal Hungarian Army
- Service years: 1905–1943
- Rank: Colonel General
- Units: I Corps; Second Army
- Conflicts: First World War; Second World War; First Battle of Voronezh; Battle of Stalingrad; Second Battle of Voronezh
- Awards: Order of Merit of the Kingdom of Hungary Grand Cross on war ribbon with swords; Knight's Cross of the Iron Cross

Colonel General Vitéz (Note: "Vitéz" is a title given to members of the Hungarian Knightly Order of Vitéz.) Gusztáv Jány (born Gusztáv Hautzinger; 21 October 1883 – 26 November 1947) was a Hungarian military officer during the Second World War who commanded the Hungarian Second Army at the Battle of Stalingrad.

== Officer ==
Jány was born as Gusztáv Hautzinger to a partial volksdeutsche (ethnic German) family. His father was Sándor Hautzinger, a Hungarian volksdeutsche who had served in the Imperial and Royal 76th Infantry Regiment of Austria-Hungary as a sergarent who had turned to working as a grocer and then as a farmer. His mother was Vilma Jány who was an ethnic Magyar. In 1896, the Hautzinger family moved to Budapest. His father worked at the Ganz Machine Factory where József Jány – Vilma Jány's younger brother – was the sales manager and then director.

Hautzinger attended the elementary school in Lébény, the Lutheran high school in Sopron, and the Deák Téri Evangelical High School, where he graduated in 1902. He attended the Ludovica Academy until 1905. He was commissioned a lieutenant on August 18, 1905. He served for three years as a platoon commander of the 8/1 Battalion and as an instructor at the volunteer school of the 8th Hungarian Royal Army Infantry Regiment in Lugosi. The crew of the Lugosi unit was largely Romanian -speaking, so Jány learend Romanian, which he followed up by becoming fluent in French.

At the beginning of World War I, he was sent to the Eastern Front as a staff officer of the 82nd Infantry Brigade. During the campaign in Galicia that he first gained fame. On November 1, 1914, he was promoted to captain and on December 1, he was accepted into the general staff of Austria-Hungary. Later, he served on the staff of the XVIII Corps, followed up by serving in the Imperial and Royal 55th Infantry Division, and starting in 1917, he served as an observation officer with German Army on the Western Front. He returned to Galicia to the staff of the operations department of the 3rd Army Command. In 1918 he served on the 1st department of the Ministry of Defense.

From February 1919, he was sent to staff of the Székely Division led by Colonel Károly Kratochwill in Satu Mare. The Hungarian Soviet Republic that came to power in March 1919 considered the activities of the Székely Division to be disruptive and ordered its disarmament. Kratochwill, Hautzinger and the rest of his division laid their arms in front of the Romanian troops at Demecser on April 27, 1919, hoping for favorable conditions. The other ranks of the division were sent to POW camps in Romania and the 600 officers were sent to the Fehér barracks in Brasó. They were held in the Szamosújvár prison from February 1920, accused of crimes against the security and defense capabilities of the Romanian state. Captain Hautzinger was released at the end of August 1920.

== Between the wars ==
Hautzinger wsa repatriated at the end of October 1920. He enlisted in the newly organized Royal Hungarian Army. He was promoted to major general and was assigned to the Debrecen Division. After the reorganization, he commanded the 6th Mixed Brigade. He was first chief of staff in Debrecen and starting in 1924 commander of the 11th Infantry Regiment. After that, he taught tactics at the Ludovika Academy. At the request of his superiors, he submitted his application for admission to the Order of Vitéz for his performance in World War I. He was ordained on June 17, 1924, at which time - as a condition - he Magyarzied his surname to his mother's name. At the age of 42, he was already a colonel. From the end of May 1928, for two years – interrupting his teaching activities – he became the Chief of Staff of the 2nd Mixed Brigade in Székesfehérvár.

From 1 September 1931, he was in charge of the Ludovika Academy for five years. Being religious, he considered it important that the institution, which had previously only had a Catholic chapel, also have a Protestant chaplain. To protest the Treaty of Trianon to the students, he arranged for the Irredenta Corridor at the Ludovika, where the relics of the truncated country were kepp. He had also had the Corridor of Heroes created in memory of the Ludovika alumni who were killed in World War I. Starting on 1 November 1934, he was appointed general.

He left the Ludovika in 1936. He became a corps commander, first as the 1st infantry commander of the 1st mixed brigade in Budapest, then from 1 November 1936 to May 1938 he was the commander of the 3rd mixed brigade in Szombathely. At that time he was promoted to lieutenant general. From 4 January 1938 he briefly served as the commander of the 1st Corps in Budapest. From 24 May, at the suggestion of Lieutenant General Lajos Keresztes-Fischer he became the head of the Military Office of the Regent of Hungary, and thus the military advisor to Miklós Horthy. He disliked office work, and did not hold that position for long.

After Hungary started to violate the disarmament clasuses of the Treaty of Trianon in 1938, rapid developments began in the Honved to implement the Huba military development plan adopted by the General Staff in 1932. From the beginning of 1939, the former mixed brigades were transformed into corps, and in the spring of 1940, the three army commands were established, with experienced generals loyal to the regent in their leading positions. Miklós Horthy entrusted Jány with the command of the Hungarian 2nd Army from 1 March 1940. He also participated in the occupation of Transylvania in September 1940. From 1 May 1941 he was an infantry general, and from August 1941 he was a colonel general.

== Operation Blue ==
Géza Lakatos who served under Jány called him "a blood and guts officer" with a highly forceful leadership style who was extremely brave. Lakatos added that Jány had a reputation as a "difficult" officer to serve under as he was inflexible and he often lost his temper, broiling over with rage at anyone he considered incompetent. Jány was deeply jealous that Ferenc Szombathelyi had been appointed chief of the general staff even through he had more seniority than Szombathelyi. Jány asked several times to resign, saying that he felt deeply insulted that an officer lower in rank and seniority to himself had been appointed chief of the general staff, requests that were always refused by the Regent, Admiral Miklós Horthy, who told Jány that he thought very highly of his abilities, but not just enough to make him chief of the general staff.

Jány as commander of the 2nd Army was informed that his command was to go to the Eastern Front. On 16 May 1942, Jány met with Adolf Hitler, who for the first time explained to him the details of Fall Blau (Case Blue), the German plan to defeat the Soviet Union in 1942. Operation Blue called for the German Army Group South to advance into the Caucasus to take the oil fields there, which provided the Soviet Union with most of its oil. To secure the flank of Army Group South as it headed into the Caucasus, a mixed force of German, Italian, Romanian and Hungarian forces were to advance across the Kuban plain to the Volga river. The elite German 6th Army was to take the city of Stalingrad (modern Volgograd, Russia) on the banks of the Volga while the Hungarian 2nd Army was to secure the flank of the 6th Army by holding a line in the lower Volga territory along the river Don. Jány felt that his soldiers needed more time to train, but was told by Szombathelyi that his men would complete their training while on deployment as the 2nd Army had only a supporting role in Operation Blue of holding the flank of the 6th Army while the Germans engaged in the main action.

In October 1942, the Defense Minister General Vilmos Nagy de Nagybaczon came to personally inspect the 2nd Army. Jány painted a grim picture of the 2nd Army to Nagy, saying that his soldiers had to hold over 200 km of the frontline; had only 6, 000 rifles; no modern tanks and no anti-tank guns; a serious shortage of artillery; and were suffering from a major shortage of fodder for the horses. The 2nd Army had to have their supplies hauled up from the railheads via wagons driven by horses, which was why the shortage of fodder was such a major problem as the inability to feed the horses led to shortages of ammunition, artillery shells and everything else. Jány called the situation of the 2nd Army a disaster in the making and asked him several times to be relieved of command, saying he wanted no part of the disaster that was about to unfold, requests that were always refused.

== The Don offensive ==
On 19 November 1942, the outcome of the Battle of Stalingrad was decided by Operation Uranus, a Red Army offensive that saw the Soviet forces smash through the two Romanian armies holding the flanks of the 6th Army, an operation that resulted in the 6th Army being encircled. At the same time, the success of Operation Uranus exposed the German Army South to being cut off. To avoid this fate, Army Group South was told to abandon the offensive into the Caucasus before the Red Army raced across the Kuban plain to reach the Black Sea. However, Hitler was still determined to relieve the 6th Army in Stalingrad and was not willing to retreat from the Volga. On 27 December 1942, Szombathelyi sent a message to Jány saying "no one is allowed to retreat; there is no backward, only forward!" Both Horthy and Szombathelyi knew that the 2nd Army was in grave danger, but were unwilling to order Jány to retreat out of the fear of damaging relations with Germany. Despite knowing a Soviet offensive against the 2nd Army was highly probable, Jány took no measures to reinforce his lines and was taken by surprise by the Soviet offensive that opened against his army on 12 January 1943, marking the beginning of the Battle of Voronezh. The frozen Don river posed no obstacle to the Soviet divisions, who broken through the Hungarian lines. On 15 January 1943, Jány reported that the 2nd Army was on the brink of annihilation and the only way to save the 2nd Army was to retreat. His request was refused and he was to hold the line. On 16 January 1943, Jány requested three times for permission to retreat over the course of the day. At 7 pm on 16 January, he called a meeting of his staff officers, where he was describe as looking very haggard and stressed while having a forced smile on his face. At that point, the phone rang and Jány was heard to say in German "I understand, yes, to the last man, shell, hold at the Don". At that point, Jány phoned in succession Szombathelyi and Horthy, asking for permission to retreat, which was refused by both men. Jány was widely admired for his bravery, but he seems to have experienced a psychological collapse under the stress of battle, being unable to think clearly while clinging to obeying orders that he knew were impossible to fulfil.

Jány reported on 16 January that his men were taking heavy losses, but "I have to emphasize that the troops are doing everything of which they are capable". On 17 January 1943, Jány finally gave the orders to retreat on his own authority. In the same order to retreat, Jány lashed out at his own men, writing: "The Second Army has lost its honor, because with the exception of a few-true to their oath and duty-they have not carried out what everyone could have expected of them". Jány went on to accuse his soldiers of cowardice and announced as a form of punishment: "No one will be allowed to return home, not for illness, for wounds, for frostbite...everyone will recover here or perish!" Jány had made no preparations for a retreat despite requesting one several times, and the retreat of the 2nd Army became disorganised rout. Jány's retreat order was widely reprinted by newspapers in Germany and Romania. In Romania, the regime of Ion Antonescu used Jány's retreat order as evidence that the Hungarians were poor soldiers and Romania would soon take back northern Transylvania. In Germany, the media presented Jány's retreat order as evidence that the Hungarians were useless as soldiers, which provided a scapegoat for the looming defeat in the Battle of Stalingrad with German newspapers saying that the Wehrmacht had fought well, but had been let down by their Hungarian allies. By 24 January 1943, what was left of the Second Army had retreated back to safety. On 2 February 1943, the Battle of Stalingrad ended with the surrender of the 6th Army. On 8 February 1943, Jány sent a telegram to Szombathelyi saying that the Germans were using the Hungarians as a scapegoat, saying that Wehrmacht generals showed a marked tendency to put the interests of their own soldiers ahead of Hungarian soldiers. The Second Army had been destroyed in the fighting along the Don with some 50, 000 Hungarian soldiers killed in action or freezing to death with another 70, 000 being taken prisoner. Most of the survivors returned to Hungary in May 1943.. On 1 May 1943, Jány returned to Budapest, where he was greeted by Admiral Horthy in a low-key ceremony at the Eastern Railroad station. Afterwards, it was announced in August 1943 that Jány had retired from the Honved.

== Trial and execution ==
In early 1945, he fled to Germany. In 1946, he returned to Hungary to face charges of war crimes. The principle charges against him at his trial in 1947 were aggression against the Soviet Union; the mistreatment of Russian civilians by soldiers under his command in the Don river area in 1942-1943; the mistreatment of members of the Labour Service battalions under his command in 1942-1943; and his orders to execute any soldier showing sign of cowardice during the retreat from the Don in January-February 1943. The destruction of the 2nd Army during the fighting along the Don in early 1943 was considered a national humilation in Hungary and Jány's trial in 1947 was given widespread media attentionn in Hungary. Jány was as much on trial for losing the battle along the Don as he was for war crimes, and in this way the Communist regime intended to discredit the Horthy era.

After the war, he was found guilty of war crimes and executed by firing squad. He was posthumously exonerated in 1993 by the Supreme Court of Hungary.

== Awards and decorations ==

| 1st row | Order of Merit of the Kingdom of Hungary Grand Cross on war ribbon with swords | Order of Merit of the Kingdom of Hungary Grand Cross | Golden Military Merit Medal on military peacetime ribbon | Order of Merit of the Kingdom of Hungary Commander's Cross with Star |
| 2nd row | Order of Merit of the Kingdom of Hungary Officer's Cross | Military Merit Cross 3rd Class with war decoration and swords | Military Merit Cross 3rd Class with war decoration and swords | Silver Military Merit Medal on war ribbon with swords |
| 3rd row | Silver Military Merit Medal on war ribbon with swords | Bronze Military Merit Medal on war ribbon with swords | Fire Cross 2nd class with wreath | National Defence Cross |
| 4th row | Hungarian World War I Commemorative Medal | Long Service Crosses for Officers 1st class | Transylvania Commemorative Medal | 1908 Jubilee Cross |
| 5th row | Mobilization Cross 1912/13 | Iron Cross 2nd Class (1939–1945) | Order of the Crown of Italy Knight Grand Cross | Order of the German Eagle with star |
| 6th row | Order of the Crown of Italy Commander's Cross | Iron Cross 2nd Class (1914, with 1939 clasp) | Gallipoli Star | War Commemorative Medal (Austria) |
| Neck Badge | Knight's Cross of the Iron Cross | | | |
| Badge | Badge of the Order of Vitéz | | | |

The Knight's Cross of the Iron Cross was awarded March 31, 1943.

== Books ==
- Cornelius, Deborah S (2011). Hungary in World War II: Caught in the Cauldron. New York: Fordham University Press. ISBN 978-0823233441.
- Eby, Cecil D (1998). Hungary at War Civilians and Soldiers in World War II. Philadelphia: Pennsylvania State University Press. ISBN 9780271017396.
- Fellgiebel, Walther-Peer (2000) [1986]. Die Träger des Ritterkreuzes des Eisernen Kreuzes 1939–1945 — Die Inhaber der höchsten Auszeichnung des Zweiten Weltkrieges aller Wehrmachtteile [The Bearers of the Knight's Cross of the Iron Cross 1939–1945 — The Owners of the Highest Award of the Second World War of all Wehrmacht Branches] (in German). Friedberg, Germany: Podzun-Pallas. ISBN 978-3-7909-0284-6.
- Kovács, Attila Ótott (2006). Die ungarischen Inhaber des Ritterkreuzes des Eisernen Kreuzes. Ranis: Scherzers Militaer-Verl. ISBN 978-3-938845-02-8.

Military offices
| Preceded by none | Commander of the Hungarian Second Army; 1 March 1940 – 5 August 1943 | Succeeded by Lieutenant-General Géza Lakatos |
