= 1st Ukrainian Front =

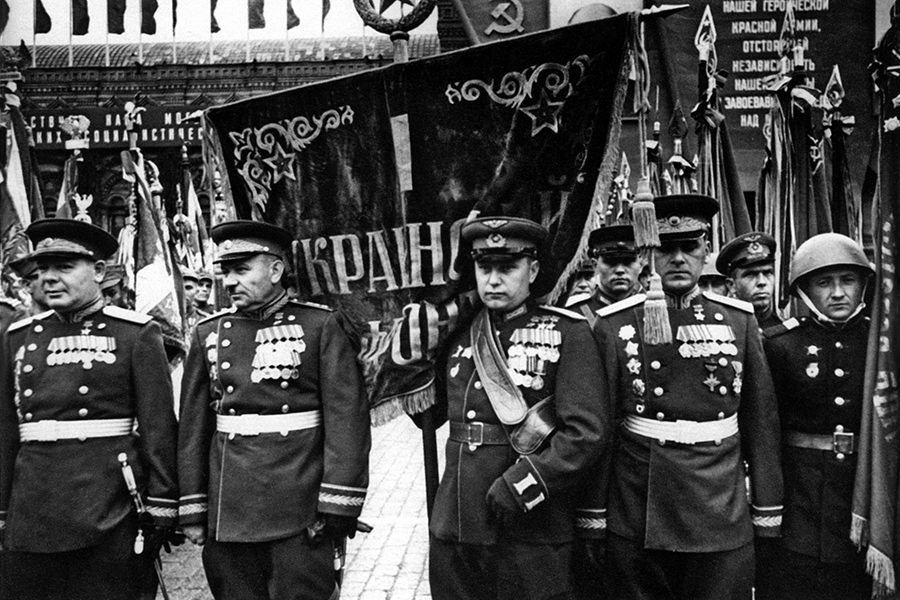
- Alexander Pokryshkin (center) carrying the standard of the 1st Ukrainian Front at the 1945 Moscow Victory Parade.
- Active: 1943–1945
- Country: Soviet Union
- Branch: Red Army
- Type: Army group
- Role: Co-ordination and conduct of Red Army Operations in Ukraine, Poland, and Germany
- Size: Several Armies
- Engagements: World War II; Battle of Korsun–Cherkassy; Battle of Kamenets–Podolsky; Lvov–Sandomierz offensive; Vistula–Oder Offensive; Silesian offensives; Siege of Breslau; Battle of Berlin; Battle of Halbe; Prague offensive

Commanders
- Notable commanders: Nikolai Vatutin (October 1943 – March 1944); Georgy Zhukov (March – May 1944); Ivan Konev (May 1944 – May 1945)

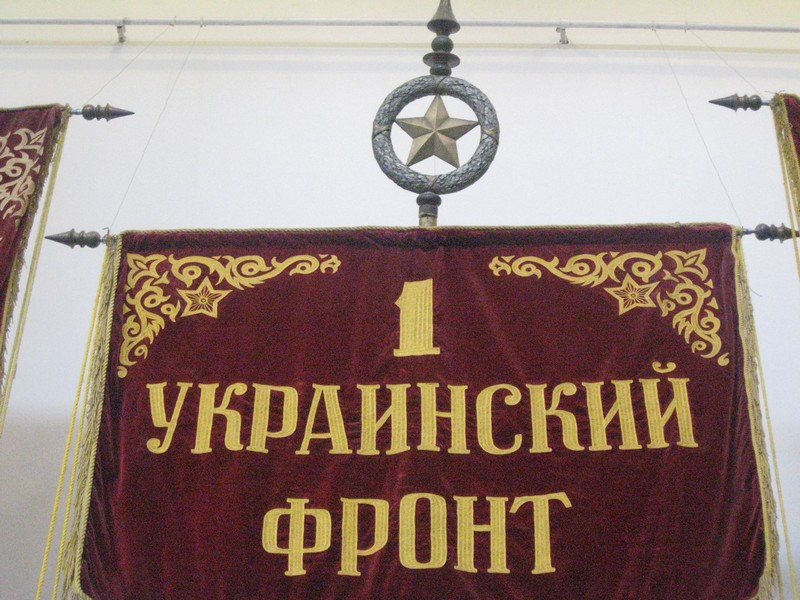
1st Ukrainian Front Standard for Victory Parade - at the Central Armed Forces Museum in Moscow

The 1st Ukrainian Front (Russian: Пéрвый Украи́нский фронт), previously the Voronezh Front (Воронежский Фронт), was a major formation of the Red Army during World War II, being equivalent to a Western army group. They took part in the capture of Berlin, the capital of Nazi Germany.

== Wartime ==
The Voronezh Front was established at the end of June 1942 when tanks of the 6th Army of the German Wehrmacht reached Voronezh during the early stages of Operation Blau. It was split off the earlier Bryansk Front in order to better defend the Voronezh region. The name indicated the primary geographical region in which the front first fought, based on the town of Voronezh on the Don River.

The Voronezh Front participated in the Battle of Voronezh, the defensive operations on the approaches to Stalingrad, and in the December 1942 Operation Saturn, the follow-on to the encirclement of the German 6th Army at Stalingrad where it destroyed the Hungarian Second Army. Following Operation Saturn, the front was involved in Operation Star, which included the Third Battle of Kharkov, which resulted in a long battle from 2 February to 23 March 1943, and the reversal of much of the Soviet gains by the Germans. During Operation Star the front included the 38th, 40th, 60th, and 69th Armies plus the 3rd Tank Army, resulting in the reorganisation of the 3rd Tank Army as the 57th Army due to its destruction. In the Battle of Kursk in August 1943, the front operated on the southern shoulder, during which it commanded the Battle of Prokhorovka on the Soviet side.

During Operation Polkovodets Rumyantsev, which began on August 3, 1943, the front included 38th, 40th, 27th Armies; the 6th and 5th Guards; and the 1st and 5th Guards Tank Armies. During this battle both the 1st and 5th Guards Tank Armies made their main effort in the 5th Guards Army sector, and succeeded eventually in liberating both Belgorod and Kharkov. One of the divisions in the 5th Guards Army was the 13th Guards Rifle Division. The front also fought in the subsequent liberation of eastern Ukraine.

On October 20, 1943, the Voronezh Front was renamed to the 1st Ukrainian Front. This name change reflected the westward advance of the Red Army in its campaign against the German Wehrmacht, leaving Russia behind and moving into Ukraine. During 1944, the front participated with other fronts in the battles of Korsun-Shevchenkivsky, and the battle of Hube's Pocket in Ukraine. It conducted the Lvov-Sandomierz Offensive, during which the Front was controlling the Soviet 1st Guards Tank Army, 3rd Guards Tank Army, 4th Tank Army, 3rd Guards, 5th Guards Army, 13th, 38th, and 60th Armies and 1st Guards Cavalry Corps. It then took part in the battle for Ternopil'. The front participated or conducted battles in Ukraine, Poland, Germany, and Czechoslovakia during 1944 and 1945. The 1st Ukrainian often spearheaded the whole Eastern Front. The 1st Ukrainian and the 1st Belorussian Fronts were the largest and most powerful of all Soviet fronts as they had the objective of reaching Berlin and ending the war.

In 1945, the front participated in the Vistula-Oder offensive, and conducted the Silesian and Prague Operations, and the siege of Breslau.

In April 1945, 58th Guards Rifle Division reached the Elbe River and took part in the Allied–Soviet link-up before advancing toward Berlin. The meeting between elements of the 19th Guards Rifle Division and the U.S. 69th Infantry Division was one of several contacts that established the Allied–Soviet link-up in central Germany.

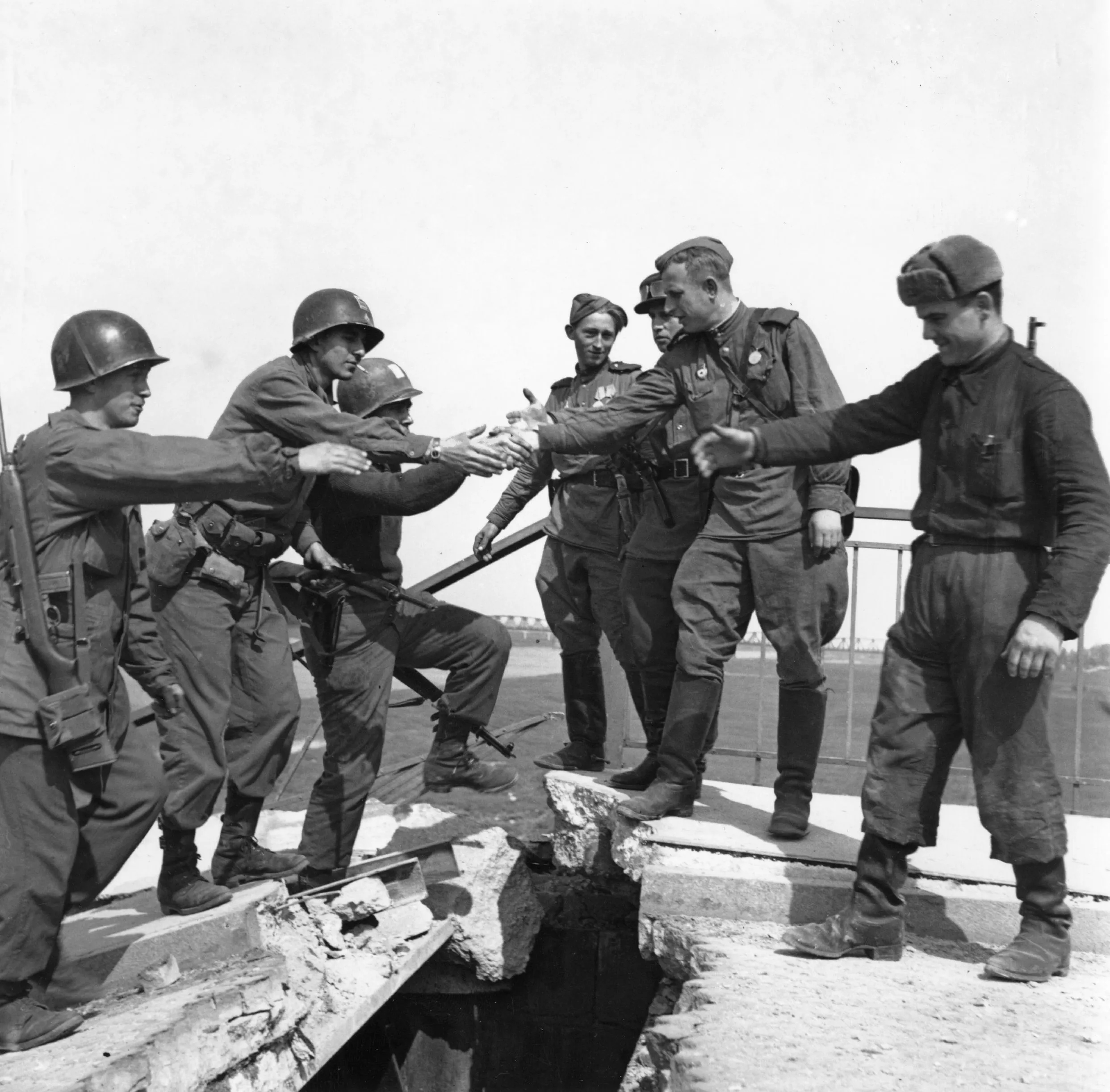
Russia Lt Charles Thau (center) behind the handshake, 25 April 1945

It also participated in the Berlin operations in Germany and Poland. The front also conducted the major part of the Halbe Encirclement, in which most of the German 9th Army was destroyed south of Berlin. By this time the Polish Second Army was operating as part of the Front. Finally, the 1st Ukrainian Front provided the defence against the counter-attacks by Armee Wenck which aimed to relieve Berlin and the 9th Army, later uniting with the Americans on the Elbe River. The front then completed the Prague Offensive which became the final battle of World War II in Europe, therefore ending the war.

Following the war, the Front headquarters formed the Central Group of Forces of the Red Army in Austria and Hungary until 1955, and re-instituted in 1968 in Czechoslovakia as a legacy of the Prague Spring events.

== Commanders ==
- Filipp Golikov (1942 – 1943)
- General Nikolai F. Vatutin (October 1943 – March 1944)
- Marshal Georgy K. Zhukov (March – May 1944)
- Marshal Ivan S. Konev (May 1944 – May 1945)

== Armies ==
The armies that were part of the 1st Ukrainian Front included:

- 1st Guards Cavalry Corps (1943-1945)
- 27th Army (1943–44) (2nd Ukrainian Front)
- 38th Army (1943–44) (4th Ukrainian Front)
- 40th Army (1943–44) (2nd Ukrainian Front)
- 47th Army (1943-43) (2nd Belorussian Front)
- 60th Army (1943–44) (4th Ukrainian Front)
- 3rd Guards Tank Army (1943–45) (Group of Soviet Forces in Germany)
- 13th Army (1943–45) (Carpathian Military District)
- 2nd Air Army (1943–1945)

=== Later composition ===
- 5th Guards Army
- 2nd Polish Army
- 52nd Army
- 4th Guards Tank Army
- 28th Army
- 31st Army
- 3rd Guards Army
