= Gaziz Al'mukhametov =

Bashkir opera singer (tenor) and composer

- Born: October 29, 1895; Muraptal, Bashkortostan
- Died: July 10, 1938 (aged 42); Ufa, Republic of Bashkortostan
- Occupation: Composer
- Years active: 1920—1937

Gaziz Salih uli Almukhametov (pronounced [ɣæˈzis saˌlʲixuˈlɯ ælmœxæˈmætəf], a.k.a. Ğäziz Älmöxämmädev; Bashkir Cyrillic: Ғәзиз Сәлих улы Әлмөхәмәтов; Tatar Cyrillic: Газиз Салих улы Әлмөхәммәдев; Russian: Гази́з Сали́хович Альмухаме́дов, Gaziz Salikhovich Almukhamedov; 1895–1938) was an ethnic Bashkir, opera singer (tenor) and composer. He was born in the village of Muraptal of Sterlitamaksky Uyezd of Ufa Governorate (now Kuyurgazinsky District of the Republic of Bashkortostan).From 1922 to 1929, he lived in Kazan. He was the People's Artist of the BASSR from 1929.Founder of the Bashkir State Opera and Ballet Theater in Ufa.

In collaboration with Vasili Vinogradov and Soltan Ğäbäşi, he composed the first Tatar operas, Saniä (1925) and Eşçe (The Worker) (1930).

Älmöxämmädev composed also vocal and instrumental concertos.

== Biography ==
His mother Galima gave birth to 20 children - all sons, of whom only six survived. The family was poor, so the children began to work for hire early. Gaziz began to sing from the age of 5-6, his parents Salih and Galima sang well. Residents of Muraptal and the surrounding villages liked to listen to their singing.

After the death of his father, at the age of seven, Gaziz was hired to graze cattle. In 1908, Gaziz left in search of a job in Tashkent with his brother Abdrakhman. In Central Asia, Gaziz worked in the vineyards in the summer, and studied in the madrassah in winter, and was engaged in singing. Gaziz began to be invited to amateur evenings, where he performed Bashkir and Tatar folk songs.

Since 1916 he began to often give concerts in the city of Orenburg. After the February Revolution of 1917 in Russia, he became a member of the Bashkir national liberation movement for the creation of an autonomous Bashkir republic. He joined the organization of the Bashkir youth "Tulkyn". He took part in concerts organized by the unrecognized Bashkir government in Orenburg, in Ufa. During the Civil War in Russia (1918-1920) he served in the Orenburg Military Department of the Bashkir Military Council. He was the leader of one of the units of the Bashkir troops. These facts from his biography played a fateful role in his fate.

At the end of the Civil War, in 1920 he studied at the People’s Conservatory in Tashkent, and later consulted at the Conservatory in Moscow Since 1921, he has been combining concert activity with collecting Bashkir and Tatar folk songs and composing. He is interested in folklore of eastern peoples, Bashkir and Tatar folk songs, their history, legends. Gradually becomes a folklorist-gatherer and performer.

== 1922—1929 ==
Gaziz Almukhametov wants to write a national opera. The work is hindered by a lack of experience and professional composers who could be consulted. On the advice of friends, he goes to Kazan. In the years 1922-1929. lives in Kazan, gives concerts, writes songs, works on operas with Sultan Gabyashi and V. I. Vinogradov.

He writes the sketches of the opera “Saniya” on the libretto of the Tatar writer Fatih Amirkhan. Together with Sultan Gabyashi and Vasily Vinogradov he continues to work on “Sania”. June 25, 1925 in Kazan, the premiere of "Saniya". Great success inspired the team of authors. The first opera was followed by the second - “Eshce (Worker)”. Both operas received a great response: the score of Saniya and photographs of authors and performers were exhibited at the International Exhibition in Frankfurt am Main, and Eshсe was shown in the summer of 1930 in Moscow at the All-Union Olympiad of National Theaters.

== 1929—1938 ==
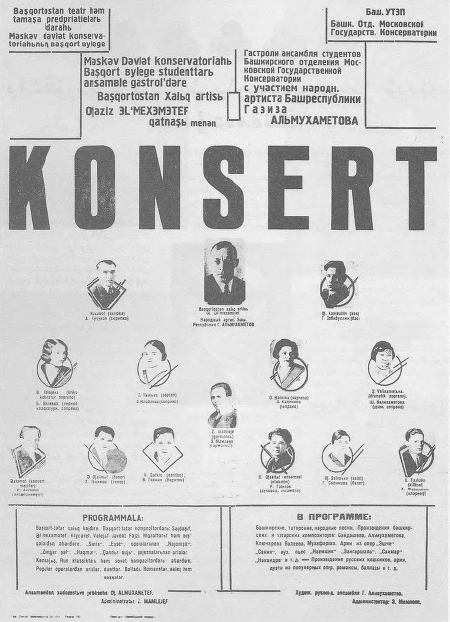
Poster of Bashkir students of the Moscow Conservatory, 1930

Life in Kazan was developing successfully. But Gaziz Almukhametov really wanted to return home to Bashkortostan. Since 1929, Almukhametov’s life and work are associated with Ufa. Almukhametov is the author of the pamphlet “In the Struggle for the Creation of Bashkir Soviet Music” (Ufa, 1933), which for the first time highlights the state of Bashkir musical culture and outlines the prospects for its development.

In Ufa, gives concerts and writes music. Gaziz Almukhametov became one of the organizers of the Bashkir Studio at Moscow Tchaikovsky Conservatory (in 1932-1936 he was its leader ) and the initiator of the opening Bashkir State Philharmonic . In search of gifted singers, he travels to the regions of the republic. The first students from Bashkortostan who had never heard the opera before were sent to the Moscow Conservatory.

In 1929, on the 10th anniversary of the Bashkir Autonomous Soviet Socialist Republic, Gaziz Almukhametov, in collaboration with Gabyashi and Vinogradov, wrote the solemn march "Bashkortostan." Almukhametov performed it in a government concert for delegates of the VII All-Bashkir Congress of Soviets. At this congress, it was decided to award the singer the title of "People's Artist of the Bashkir Autonomous Soviet Socialist Republic."

In his concert trips and expeditions to collect folklore, Gaziz Salikhovich continued to search for new talents for the opera studio (he selected 25 out of 500 people) in the future they became masters (singers, musicians, composers). Among them were singers Banu Valeeva, Khabir Galimov, Gabdrakhman Khabibullin, Zaituna Ilbaeva, Ulyana Kalinina-Syrtlanova, Asma Shaimuratova, Maryam Gabdrakhmanova, Muslima Musina, and composers Zagir Ismagilov and Khusain Akhmetov.

Since 1932 he worked at the Ufa College of Music and at the same time at the Bashkir Research Institute of Language and Literature. He recorded Bashkir folk songs “Ashkadar”, “Buranbai”, “Taftilyau”, “Ural”, an excerpt from the epic legend “Kungyr-buga” and others.

Almukhametov did not limit his repertoire to folk songs, classical romances and arias, but also created his own original things. His ballad "The Evil Wind" is one of the first works in this genre in Bashkir and Tatar music. The song “On Mayakovsky’s death” is peculiar, the lyrics were very popular: “Boats”, “I am writing songs”, “On the shore of Agideli”. He was disturbed by the fact that young people were brought up in the spirit of disrespect for Bashkir folk songs. From the pages of newspapers, he denounces a fascination with light songs that do not have a deep content. Almukhametov prepared the national repertoire for the future opera house. He ordered new operas by composers S. Gabyashi and A. Klyucharyov. “Secret Marriage” of Cimarosa and “La molinara” by Paisiello were translated from Italian into the Bashkir language. It was a period of rapid industrialization and cultural revolution in the USSR. Almukhametov’s initiatives were supported by the leaders of the Bashkir Autonomous Soviet Socialist Republic (republic), who cared about the development of education and culture of the republic. In Ufa, Almukhametov was twice ill with typhus. His two daughters died in infancy.

Since 1936 he was an artist of the Directorate of Art under the Government of the Bashkir Autonomous Soviet Socialist Republic, and since July of that year he was the leader of a group of brigades. In 1937-1938 there were repressions against many figures of the state, science, culture, etc.

He was arrested on December 12, 1937. At that time he was going to go on tour to Tashkent. In prison, Gaziz Almukhametov sang in front of the bars for all prisoners, sang the bashkir songs "Ural" and "Buranbai". He was in prison for seven months. Shot on July 10, 1938, rehabilitated in 1957.

After the arrest of her parents, Roza Almukhametova lived in the family of the parents of the future composer Nariman Sabitov. But Mastura Fayzullina (Almukhametov’s wife) was soon released from prison due to illness.

Roza Latypova (Almukhametova), the daughter of singer has kept a vinyl record, on one side of which was recorded Nigmat’s aria from the opera Eshce, and on the other, the song Minlebika. It was accidentally discovered on the Tashkent market by the cousin of the singer. On the record, the name of the singer was very carefully destroyed. In 1937-1987, even mentioning the name of the first Bashkir professional singer and composer Gaziz Almukhametov was forbidden.

Älmöxämmädev was a victim of Great Purge. He was arrested on 12 December 1937 and was shot on July 10, 1938.

== Works ==
- Башҡорт сәвит музыкаһы тыуҙырыу өсөн көрәш юлында. — Өфө, 1933.

== Memory ==
- On December 14, 1938, the premiere of Paisello's opera La molinara in the Bashkir State Opera and Ballet Theater (in the Bashkir language) took place (the Theater was opened). This theater is the best monument to Gaziz Almukhametov.
- In 1968, the Republican contest of young singers for the prize named after Gaziz Almukhametov was established (in the BASSR).
- In 1994, his name was given to the Republican Music School of the city of Ufa.
- On the life and work of G. S. Almukhametov in 1994 in the studio of the State Television and Radio Broadcasting Company Bashkortostan the documentary "I Will Return to You" was shot (scenes by E. M. Davydova, dir. F S. Safiullina).
- In 1995, in honor of the 100th anniversary of the People’s Artist of the BASSR, the museum of G. S. Almukhametov was opened in the village of Muraptal.
- There are streets of Gagiz Almukhametov in the village of Nagaevo, the Oktyabrsky district of the city of Ufa and in the village of Muraptal of the Kuyurgazinsky district of Bashkortostan.

== References and notes ==
- "Ğäziz Älmöxämmätev/Газиз Әлмөхәммәтев". Tatar Encyclopaedia (in Tatar). Kazan: The Republic of Tatarstan Academy of Sciences. Institution of the Tatar Encyclopaedia. 2002.
