= Banat Batyrova =

- Банат Батырова
- Born: Banat Khairullovna Batyrova; 16 December 1904; Staromusino, Ufimsky Uyezd, Ufa Governorate. Russian Empire
- Died: 19 July 1970 (aged 65)
- Occupation: Farmer
- Years active: 1930–1970
- Awards: Hero of Socialist Labour; Order of Lenin

Banat Khairullovna Batyrova (Russian: Банат Хайрулловна Батырова; 16 December 1904 – 19 July 1970) was a Russian farmer who worked on the Idel collective farm. She was a member of the team producing beet and increased the harvested yields of beet on the farm through education and the implementation of improved practices. Batyrova was a deputy of the Supreme Soviet of the Bashkir Autonomous Soviet Socialist Republic from 1947 to 1959. She was presented with the title of Hero of Socialist Labour along with the Order of Lenin and the "Hammer and Sickle" gold medal.

== Biography ==
Batyrova was born into a forester's family in the village of Staromusino, Ufimsky Uyezd (today the Karmaskalinsky District), Ufa Governorate on 16 December 1904 and she was a Bashkir. After the death of her father, at age six, she began helping her mother. Batyrova first worked as a nanny for a wealthy man before becoming a farmhand. She married in 1921 and relocated to her husband's village of Utyaganovo.

Starting in 1930, Batyrova worked as a sugar beet grower on the Idel collective farm, Karmaskalinsky district, Bashkir Autonomous Soviet Socialist Republic. In 1932, she became a member of the collective farm's team producing beet. Batyrova completed district courses and was made the leader of the sugar beet growers team in 1935. The harvested yields increased from 25 to 50 centners per hectare to 502 centners per hectare by late 1946 through Batyrova studying agricultural practices, improved practices, the methods of top-performing sugar beet growers and constructing a seed bank for growing sugar beets on large areas. Her team was invited to an agricultural exhibition in Ufa and were awarded a medal for their work. The farm was studied by other workers from other collective farms and districts. Batyrova's husband died during the Great Patriotic War in 1943 but she continued working alongside women and children when men were called up to fight Nazi Germany following its invasion of the Soviet Union. Her team's record of beet harvest of 611.5 centners per hectare was set in 1947.

Batyrova was elected to serve as a deputy of the Sakhaevsky electoral district in the second, third and fourth convocations of the Supreme Soviet of the Bashkir Autonomous Soviet Socialist Republic between 1947 and 1959. She was the author of the book Our Experience in Growing Sugar Beet. Batyrova retired in 1960 but she continued working in Utyaganovo and on the collective farm until her death on 19 July 1970.

== Recognition ==
She was awarded the title of Hero of Socialist Labour and the Order of Lenin and the "Hammer and Sickle" gold medal by the Presidium of the Supreme Soviet of the Soviet Union on 2 April 1948 "for achieving high yields of wheat, rye, and sugar beets while the collective farm fulfilled mandatory deliveries and payment in kind for the operation of the machine and tractor station in 1947 and for providing grain seeds for the 1948 sowing season." Batyrova's name was given to a street in Utyaganovo. A sculptural portrait of her called "Bashkortostan Kolkhoz Beet Grower" was made by Tamara Nechayeva.
