= Battle of Kalach =

1942 WWII battle of the Eastern Front

- Part of the Battle of Stalingrad during the Eastern Front of World War II
Date	July 25 – August 11, 1942
Location	West of Kalach-na-Donu, Russia
Result	German victory

Belligerents
Germany	Soviet Union

Commanders and leaders
(Nazi Germany) Friedrich Paulus (Nazi Germany) Hermann Hoth (Nazi Germany) Walter Heitz (Nazi Germany) Gustav Anton von Wietersheim (Nazi Germany) Karl Strecker (Nazi Germany) Walther von Seydlitz-Kurzbach (Nazi Germany) Willibald von Langermann und Erlencamp (Nazi Germany) Martin Fiebig	(Soviet Union) Vasily Gordov (Soviet Union) Vladimir Kolpakchi (Soviet Union) Vasily Chuikov (Soviet Union) Kirill Moskalenko (Soviet Union) Vasily Kryuchyonkin (Soviet Union) Timofey Khryukin

Units involved
6th Army; VIII Army Corps; XI Army Corps; XIV Army Corps; LI Army Corps; 4th Panzer Army; XXIV Army Corps; Supported by: Luftwaffe; 8th Air Corps; At least 270 thousand military personnel	Stalingrad Front; 62nd Army; 64th Army; 1st Tank Army; 4th Tank Army; 8th Air Army; 150–160 thousand military personnel

Strength
c. 270,000 men 500 tanks 3000 guns and mortars	c. 160,000 men 400 tanks 2,200 guns and mortars

Casualties and losses
5,000–6,000 killed	35,000 captured 270 tanks destroyed or captured 560 guns destroyed or captured

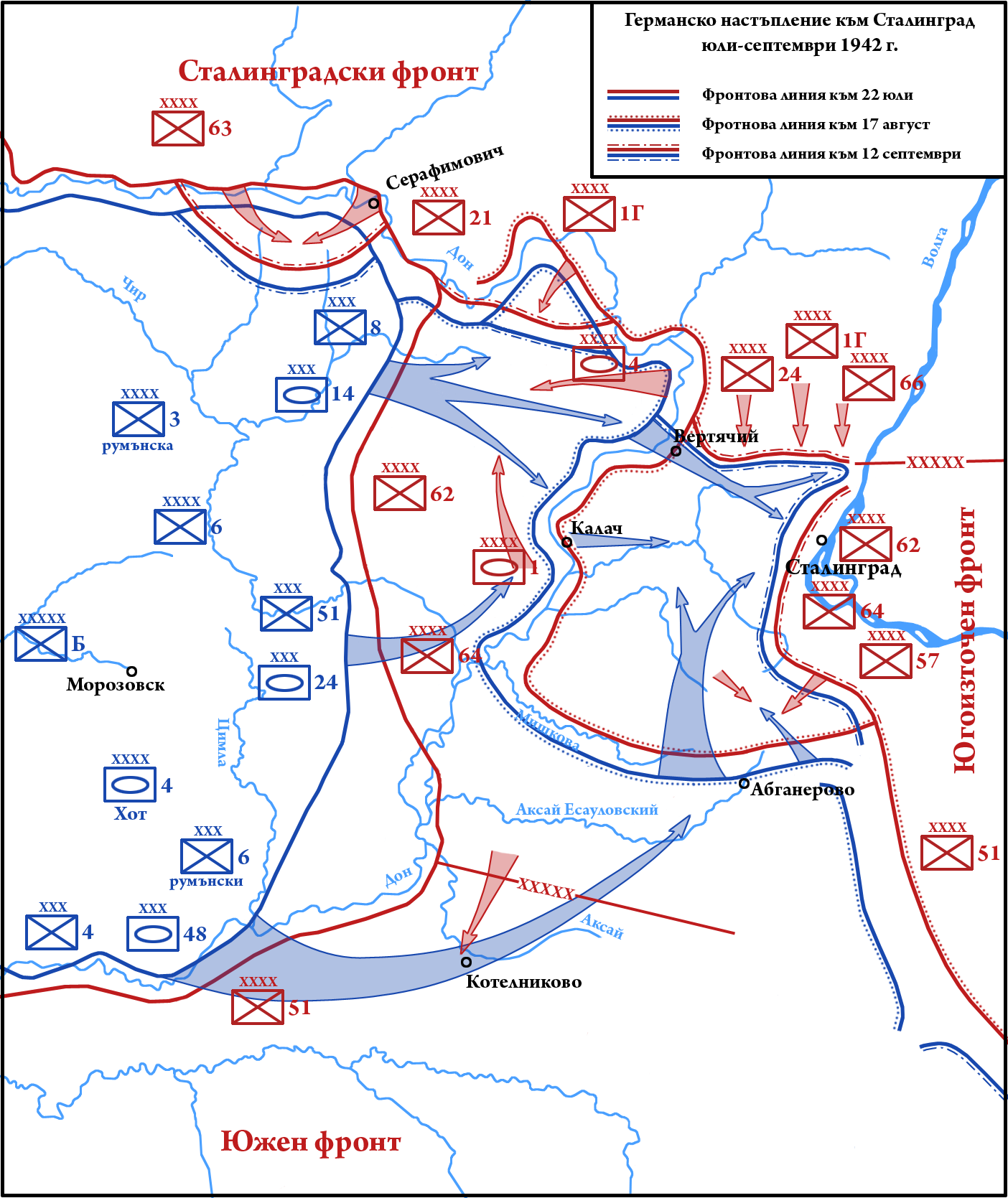
Map showing the German (blue) attack in August 1942 that surrounded the Soviet (red) 62nd Army at the Battle of Kalach.

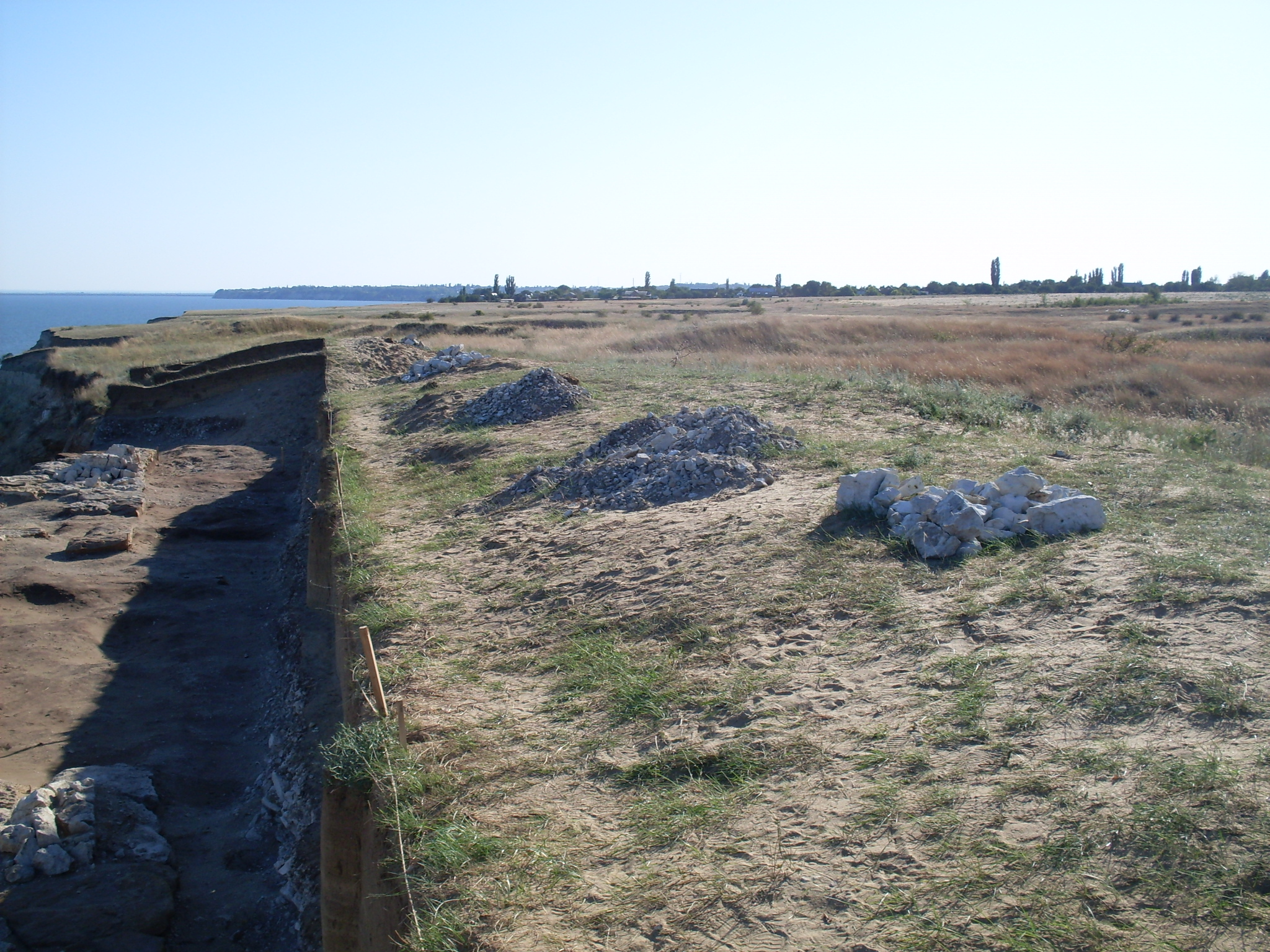
Terrain by the Don River south of Kalach.

The Battle of Kalach (Note: Battle of Kalach is a phrase found in German- (German: Kesselschlacht bei Kalatsch) and English-language historiography. The Soviet history of World War II (История второй мировой войны 1939–1945 в двенадцати томах) considers the battles at Kalach to have been the initial blows of the Battle of Stalingrad.) took place between the German Sixth Army and elements of the Soviet Stalingrad Front between July 25 and August 11, 1942. The Soviets deployed the 62nd and 64th Armies in a Don River bridgehead west of Kalach with the intent of impeding the German advance on Stalingrad. In the initial period of the battle, the Germans attacked and managed to surround part of the 62nd Army. In reaction, the Soviets counter-attacked and temporarily forced the Germans onto the defense. Following resupply of German forces, the roles again reversed and the Germans attacked into the flanks of the Soviet bridgehead, successfully collapsing it. The German victory positioned the Sixth Army to cross the Don River and advance on Stalingrad, which became the site of the Battle of Stalingrad.

== Planning ==
=== Operational goals ===
Following the occupation of the Crimea and the Battle of Kharkov, the Germans launched their 1942 summer offensive with the objectives of occupying the Don Basin, Stalingrad, and the Caucasus. Advancing as part of Army Group B, the German Sixth Army pushed toward the town of Kalach on the Don River as a step toward the capture of Stalingrad. As defenders, the Soviets were reacting to German initiatives, but they knew Stalingrad was a German objective and were determined to defend the city as far forward as possible. To meet this goal, while the Soviets were generally withdrawing before the German offensive, they retained a bridgehead across the Don at Kalach with lines behind the Tsimla and Chir Rivers.

=== Terrain ===
The battlefield was the steppe country west and northwest of Kalach. The terrain of the battlefield is mostly open with occasional treelines that obscure lines of sight and fire. The land rolls slightly and exhibits small rises with an average elevation of 100 to 200 meters above sea level. Cross country vehicular movement is constricted by balkas, steep stream banks that have been strongly cut by erosion. Between the treelines and balkas, the countryside is agricultural with occasional villages and fewer towns. The relatively open nature of the terrain favors long-range direct fire weapons such as the long 75-mm cannon that were mounted on German Panzer IV tanks. A lack of commanding terrain and structures made observation for artillery fire challenging and rewarded the opponent who could fly aerial observation missions. In the event, the German forces enjoyed air superiority over the Kalach battlefield with the commitment of the entire VIII Air Corps under the command of General Fiebig.

=== Deployments ===
The German Sixth Army had ranged from north to south the VIII, XIV Panzer, LI, and XXIV Panzer Corps, commanding some 270,000 men, over 500 tanks, and 3,000 guns and mortars. (Note: Soviet claims of Sixth Army tank strength appear somewhat overstated. Divisional returns (as listed in Nafziger) between 28 June and 1 July 1942 for the 16th and 24th Panzer Divisions and the 3rd and 60th Motorized Divisions show 72 Panzer II, 237 Panzer III, and 71 Panzer IV tanks in total. However, the Soviets may have included assault guns and self-propelled tank destroyers in their count of "tanks".) The German forces had superior battle experience and excellent gunnery skills. Their movement and attacks enjoyed air support, but the Sixth Army had temporarily outrun its supplies, particularly in the cases of fuel and ammunition.

Soviet opposition in the Don bend was still weak, but it was increasing. 62nd Army had 6 rifle divisions, a tank brigade, and 6 independent tank battalions on its half of the line, and 64th Army had 2 rifle divisions and a tank brigade. To the north of the 62nd Army was the 63rd Army. The force committed by the Soviets to defend in front of Kalach included 160,000 men, some 400 tanks, and 2,200 guns and mortars, but suffered from serious shortages of anti-aircraft and anti-tank guns. Rifle divisions of the Stalingrad Front were in a perilous state, with over half of them understrength, ranging in strength between 300 and 4,000 men. Between the Volga and the Don, 57th Army was being reformed as the front reserve and the Headquarters, 38th and 28th Armies, together with those of their troops that had survived earlier battles, were being used as cadres for building the 1st and 4th Tank Armies. The tank armies would be committed before their organization was complete and without the cohesion enjoyed by more experienced and better trained formations. The Soviet forces in the Kalach Bridgehead were subordinated to the Stalingrad Front under the command of General-Lieutenant Vasiliy N. Gordov.

== Battle ==
After a ten-day hiatus caused by a lack of transportation, German Sixth Army (under the command of General Friedrich Paulus) returned to the offensive. On 23 July, Paulus submitted his plan to take Stalingrad. He proposed to sweep to the Don on both sides of Kalach, take bridgeheads on the run, and then drive a wedge of armor flanked by infantry across the remaining thirty miles. On 23 July the German main body started its advance toward the Don River. The Germans now met with increasing Soviet resistance from the 62nd and 64th Armies of the newly formed Stalingrad Front.

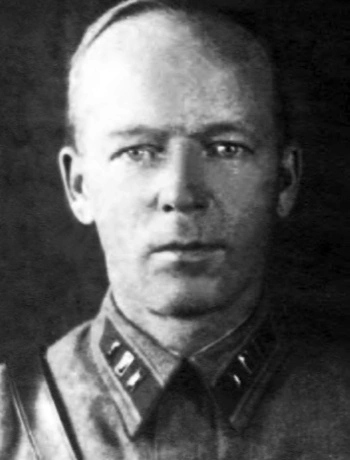
Colonel K. A. Zhuravlev, commander of «Zhuravlev group»

The German Sixth Army had been running into and over 62nd and 64th Armies' outposts since 17 July without knowing it. On the 23rd, Sixth Army hit the Soviet main line east of the Chir River. The VIII Corps, on the north, encountered several Soviet rifle divisions in the morning, and those delayed its march east four or five hours. The XIV Panzer Corps, bearing in toward Kalach, reported 200 enemy tanks in its path and claimed to have knocked out 40 during the day. The German advance of 23 July caved in part of the 62nd Army's front and encircled two rifle divisions and a tank brigade of the army.

On the 24th, VIII Corps cleared the northern quarter of the Don bend except for a Soviet bridgehead at Serafimovich (Note: Serafimovich: 49°35′19″N 42°44′55″E) and another around Kremenskaya (Note: Kremenskaya: 49°28′42.5″N 43°27′17″E) and Sirotinskaya. (Note: Sirotinskaya: 49°15′21″N 43°40′15″E) To the south, as the daily report put it, Sixth Army "consolidated," because XIV Panzer Corps ran out of motor fuel and the infantry could not make headway against stiffening resistance north and east of Kalach. General Major K. S. Moskalenko, who had taken command of 1st Tank Army three days before, began the counterattack on 25 July, with General Vasilevsky present as Stavka representative. The 1st Tank Army was given the mission of pushing to the northwest, relieving the encirclement of the 62nd Army forces, and cutting off elements of the XIV Panzer Corps that had reached the Don.

While XIV Panzer Corps was still waiting to refuel, 60 Soviet tanks cut the road behind it, and German 3d and 60th Motorized Divisions, the ones closest to Kalach, became entangled with 200 Soviet tanks. The army chief of staff told the army group operations chief, "For the moment a certain crisis has developed." At the day's end, XIV Panzer, LI, and XXIV Panzer Corps were ranged shoulder to shoulder on the Stalingrad axis, but the Russians were still holding a forty-mile-wide and twenty-mile-deep bridgehead from Kalach to Nizhny Chir

The German forces experienced continuing ammunition shortages, caused by the extraordinarily large numbers of Soviet tanks they were meeting in the Kalach bridgehead. XIV Panzer Corps alone claimed to have knocked out 482 Soviet tanks in the last eight days of the month, and the total Sixth Army claimed was well over 600. Soviet accounts confirm that strong tank forces were in the Kalach bridgehead, but not as many tanks as the Germans claimed. Moskalenko's 1st Tank Army had 13th and 28th Tank Corps (with just over three hundred tanks) and one rifle division. 4th Tank Army, under General Major V. D. Kruchenkin, entered the battle on 28 July with one other tank corps, the 22nd Tank Corps, and pushed west against the XIV Panzer Corps.

The hasty Soviet attacks failed to throw the Germans back, but they forced the German advance to halt and compelled the German units to engage in combat at a time when their stocks of supplies were low. By 30 July, General Franz Halder at OKH noted in his diary, "Sixth Army's striking power is paralyzed by ammunition and fuel supply difficulties." During this phase, the Soviets fought at a disadvantage as the Luftwaffe dominated the air over the Kalach Bridgehead and repeatedly struck the 1st and 4th Tank Armies.

During the battle for the city approaches in late July and August, Fiebig's Fliegerkorps VIII provided 6th Army with effective air support, bombing Red Army troop formations, tanks, vehicles, artillery and fortified positions in the battle area and simultaneously striking enemy supply depots and logistical infrastructure, mobilization centers and road, rail and river traffic. Generalmajor Wolfgang Pickert's 9th Flak Division used its anti-aircraft guns for ground combat against Soviet fortifications and vehicles and against those Soviet fighters and ground-attack aircraft that kept clear of Fiebig's fighters. 6th Army's commander, Generaloberst Friedrich Paulus personally praised Pickert's close cooperation with his army.

While waiting for its motor fuel and ammunition stocks to be replenished, Sixth Army was getting Headquarters, XI Corps, which had been held at Kamensk-Shakhtinsky with two infantry divisions as the OKH reserve. On 4 August, when his mobile units had enough fuel to go about thirty miles, Paulus ordered the attack on the Kalach bridgehead to start on the 8th. However, the next day the OKH asked to have the attack start at least a day earlier because Hitler was worried that the Soviet troops would escape across the Don if Paulus waited longer. Hitler also ordered Richthofen to support 6th Army's new attack at Kalach west of the Don River on 7 August. Richthofen flew first to Paulus's command post and then to Army Group B's headquarters, where the supreme commander Maximilian von Weichs was critical of his Italian and Hungarian units. Both Paulus and Weichs were highly optimistic about the success of the offensive. Weichs and Richthofen coordinated a land-air Schwerpunkt on Kalach.

At dawn on 7 August, XIV and XXIV Panzer Corps pierced the Soviet front line near Kalach from the north and the south, all the while receiving support from Fiebig's air corps and parts of Pflugbeil's. From the northeast and southwest, tight against the Don River, XIV and XXIV Panzer Corps struck into the Kalach bridgehead. Their spearheads made contact southwest of Kalach by late afternoon, trapping the main body (eight rifle divisions) of the Soviet 62nd Army in an encirclement. Joined by LI Army Corps the Germans began systematically destroying the surrounded Soviet forces. The pocket was reduced in four days, by 11 August. Nearly 50,000 prisoners were taken, and the Germans claimed the destruction of a thousand Soviet tanks and 750 guns, although the claims of destroyed Soviet tanks are considered a little exaggerated.

Air support in the battle was crucial. Fiebig's Junkers Ju 87 Stuka dive bombers struck the trapped Soviet troops and vehicles while Heinkel He 111 and Junkers Ju 88 medium bombers bombed the Soviet railway network and airfields, destroying 20 Soviet aircraft on the ground on 10 August, the Soviet 8th Air Army losing its 447 replacement aircraft from 20 July to 17 August as fast as it received them. The Soviet Air Forces had shortcomings in logistics, crew training and army-air communications and liaison. The Soviet aircraft were committed to the fight upon arrival and were destroyed by the Germans. On 12 August Fliegerkorps VIII destroyed 25 of 26 Soviet aircraft that attacked German airfields that day, suffering no losses in turn. No German losses were sustained the next day either as Fliegerkorps VIII destroyed 35 of 45 Soviet aircraft that tried to attack the German airfields.

== Aftermath ==
Both Soviet tank armies and the 62nd Army suffered heavy losses during the battle. The German Sixth Army closed to the Don River and prepared to advance on Stalingrad, but had also taken losses during the two-week battle. Among areas of Soviet resistance not cleared up was a small bridgehead across the Don at Kremenskaya. Months later, this bridgehead became one of the launching points for Operation Uranus, the Soviet offensive that encircled and eventually forced the surrender of the Sixth Army.

The loss of the Kalach bridgehead brought the close-in defense of Stalingrad nearer to actuality on the Soviet side, and the Stavka committed more of its reserves, totalling fifteen rifle divisions and three tank corps between 1 and 20 August. The losses suffered during the Battle of Kalach resulted in the disbandment (for the time being) of the 1st Tank Army, the remnants of which were used to partially rebuild the 62nd Army starting on 17 August.

== Notes ==
Footnotes

Locations

Citations
