= 1st Air Army =

- Active: May 10, 1942 – January 10, 1949; July 1, 1957 – 1998
- Country: Soviet Union
- Branch: Air Force
- Type: Air Army
- Size: Several
- Part of: Western Front; 3rd Belarusian Front
- Engagements: World War II; Battles of Rzhev; Battle of Kursk; Battle of Smolensk; Battle of Memel; Operation Bagration; East Prussian Offensive

Commanders
- Notable commanders: T. F. Kucevalov (May–June 1942); S. А. Khudyakov (June 1942 – May 1943); М. М. Gromov (May 1943 – July 1944); T. T. Khryukin (July 1944 – May 1945)

The 1st Air Army (Russian: 1-я воздушная армия) was an Air Army in the Soviet Air Force which served during World War II. It was formed on May 10, 1942, within the Soviet Western Front, and renamed the 26th Air Army on January 10, 1949, in the Belorussian Military District.

After the war, it was reformed on July 1, 1957, and was active until 1998.

== Second World War ==
When it was formed, the 1st Air Army was made up of two fighter aviation divisions (with four fighter aviation regiments each), two mixed aviation divisions (with two fighter aviation regiments, two assault aviation regiments and one bombing regiment each) a training aviation regiment, a long-range reconnaissance aviation regiment, a communications squadron, and a night close-range bombing aviation regiment.

=== Structure 1942 ===
May 10, 1942:

- 201st Fighter Aviation Division
- 202nd Fighter Aviation Division
- 203rd Fighter Aviation Division
- 214th Assault Aviation Division
- 215th Mixed Aviation Division

May 23, 1942:

- 201st Fighter Aviation Division
- 202nd Fighter Aviation Division
- 203rd Fighter Aviation Division
- 234th Fighter Aviation Division
- 235th Fighter Aviation Division
- 204th Bomber Aviation Division
- 213th Night Bomber Aviation Division
- 215th Mixed Aviation Division (later included the 894th Fighter Aviation Regiment in July 1942)
- 214th Assault Aviation Division
- 224th Assault Aviation Division
- 231st Assault Aviation Division
- 232nd Assault Aviation Division
- 233rd Assault Aviation Division

From 22 February 1943 until May 1946, the 18th Guards Fighter Aviation Regiment served with the 303rd Aviation Division (ru:303-я истребительная авиационная дивизия) of the Army.

In March 1943, the Air Army also included the French Normandie-Niemen squadron, which was later reorganized into a regiment. In 1942, the 1st Air Army fought alongside the troops of the Western Front, supporting them near Yukhnov, Gzhatsk and Rzhev. The Air Army later participated in the Rzhev-Sychevka, Rzhev-Vyazma, Oryol, Smolensk, Belarusian, Memel and East Prussian offensive operations.

In May 1945, the 1st Air Army comprised the:

- 129th Fighter Aviation Division
- 130th Fighter Aviation Division (Chernyakhovsk, Kaliningrad Oblast)
- 303rd Fighter Aviation Division (Elblag, Poland)
- 330th Fighter Aviation Division
- 1st Guards Assault Aviation Division (Ketrzyn, Poland)
- 182nd Assault Aviation Division
- 277th Assault Aviation Division (Yudino, Kaliningrad Oblast)
- 311th Assault Aviation Division
- 6th Guards Bomber Aviation Division (Chernyakhovsk, Kaliningrad Oblast) (later a division of Military Transport Aviation)
- 213th Night-Bomber Aviation Division (Paslek, Poland)
- 276th Bomber Aviation Division
- 1st Free French ('Normandie-Niemen') Fighter Aviation Regiment (Mamonovo, Kaliningrad Oblast)
- 406th Night-Bomber Aviation Regiment
- 10th independent Reconnaissance Aviation Regiment
- 90th independent Reconnaissance Aviation Regiment
- 142nd Transport Aviation Regiment
- 117th independent Artillery Correction Regiment
- 151st independent Artillery Correction Regiment
- 1st Medical Aviation Regiment
- 354th independent Communications Aviation Regiment
- 1st independent Agitation Aviation Squadron
- 33rd independent Communications Aviation Squadron
- 203rd independent Communication Aviation Squadron

Throughout the war, the 1st Air Army made 290,000 sorties. Five of the Air Army's formations where reorganized as "Guards Units", 50 formations were given "honourable titles", 44 formations received various awards, 145 pilots and navigators received the title "Hero of the Soviet Union" and over 17,000 of its servicemen were also given various medals and decorations.

=== Command structure ===
Source: Militera.lib.ru Commanders:

- Lieutenant General (of Aviation) Timofei Kutsevalov (May–June 1942)
- Major General (of Aviation) Sergei Khudyakov (June 1942 – May 1943)
- Lieutenant General (of Aviation) Mikhail Mikhaylovich Gromov (May 1943 – July 1944)
- Colonel General (of Aviation) Timofey Khryukin (July 1944 – May 1945)

Chiefs of Staff:

- Major General (of Aviation) Aleksandr S. Pronin (5 May 1942 – 9 August 1944)
- Major General (of Aviation) Ivan M. Belov (12 February – May, 1945)

== Postwar ==
There were two Air Armies active by the end of the war in the Far East, the 9th and 10th Air Armies. In the early 1949 redesignations of the Soviet Air Forces, the 9th Air Army became 54th Air Army, the 10th Air Army became 29th Air Army in the Primorsky Military District. On 1 April 1957 the two were united as the 1st Special Far Eastern Air Army, and at some later point the designation was simplified purely to 1st Air Army.

On 30 April 1975 the Army was awarded the Order of the Red Banner.

The army's order of battle c.1988 according to Vad777 and supplemented by Holm/Feskov et al. 2013 was:

- HQ 1st Air Army (Khabarovsk)
  - 257th Mixed Aviation Regiment (Khabarovsk): transport airplanes and helicopters
- 28th Fighter Aviation Division
  - 216th Fighter Aviation Regiment (Kalinovka, near Khabarovsk): Su-27. (disbanded May 1998)
  - 404th Fighter Aviation Regiment (Orlovka, Amur Oblast): MiG-29. Disbanded 2000–2001 with awards and banners to the 23 IAP.) Earlier reporting by Vad777 said this might have been the 41st.
- 33rd "Hinganskaya" Fighter-Bomber Aviation Division (Pereyaslavka)
  - 229th Fighter-Bomber Aviation Regiment (Birofeld, Jewish Autonomous Oblast): Su-17.
  - 300th Fighter-Bomber Aviation Regiment: MiG-27 (Pereyaslavka-2, Khabarovsk Kray, 70 km south of Khabarovsk). Disbanded November 1989.
  - 302nd Fighter-Bomber Aviation Regiment: (Pereyaslavka): Su-17М4. Reequipped with Su-24 1990 and redesignated a Bomber Aviation Regiment.
- 83rd Bomber Aviation Division
  - 277th "Mlavsky" Red Banner Bomber Aviation Regiment (Khurba under Komsomolsk-on-Amur): Su-24. (Holm: 83rd Bomber Aviation Division)
  - 26th Guards Fighter-Bomber Aviation Regiment (10th Sector/10-й участок, under Komsomolsk-on-Amur): Su-17 (disbanded 1988).
- 303rd "Smolenskaya" Red Banner Fighter-Bomber Aviation Division (Ussuriisk, Primorsky Krai)
  - 18th "Vitebskiy" Guards twice Red Banner Order Recipient, Order of Suvorov Recipient Fighter-Bomber Aviation Regiment (Galenki, 30 km north-west of Ussuriisk): MiG-27
  - 224th Fighter-Bomber Aviation Regiment (Novoshakhtinsky under Ussuri): MiG-27. Disbanded 1992.
  - 523rd "Orshanskiy" Red Banner, Suvorov and Kutuzov Orders Recipient Fighter-Bomber Regiment (Vozdvizhenka under Ussuri): Su-17МЗ, М4. Disbanded October 1994.
- Regiments reporting directly to Army HQ included:
- 293rd Fighter-Bomber Aviation Regiment (Vozzhaevka, Belogarsky District Amur Oblast): Su-17.
- 187th Attack Aviation Regiment (Chernigovka, Primorsky Krai under G. Sibirtsevo): Su-25.
- 799th Separate Reconnaissance Aviation Regiment (Varfolomeyevka (village), Primorsky Krai, in the district of Arseniev): Su-24.

In 1989 the 1st Air Army disbanded the headquarters of the 33rd Fighter-Bomber Aviation Division, and in 1994 the headquarters of the 303rd Fighter-Bomber Aviation Division.

The 1st Air Army was merged with the 11th Air Defence Army in 1998 to form the 11th Air and Air Defence Forces Army.
