= Mansur Muzafarov =

Russian composer

Mozaffarov Mansur Äxmät ulı (pronounced [mɔzɑˈfɑrəf mʌnˈsur æxˌmætuˈlɯ]), aka Mansur Mozaffarov; Tatar Cyrillic: Мозаффаров Мансур Әхмәт улы; Russian: Музафа́ров Мансу́р Ахме́тович, Muzafarov Mansur Akhmetovich; 6 March 1902 – 20 November 1966) was a Tatar composer and pedagogue. TASSR Honoured Worker of Culture (1950), People's Artist of the Tatar ASSR (1964). Mansur was a son of Tatar emancipatress Mahruy Mozaffariä. Mansur Mozaffarov is one of the founding fathers of Tatar professional music.

Since 1945 he lectured in Kazan Conservatory, and between 194 and 1961 headed Composition chain.

Major works: Ğäliäbanu (1940), Zölxäbirä (wasn't staged) operas, symphony (1944), symphonic poems in commemoration of Ğabdulla Tuqay and Mullanur Waxitov (1952, 1956), two concertos for viola with orchestra (1959, 1962), vocal and instrumental concertos, recording and arrangement of folk songs. Mozaffarov was the Ğabdulla Tuqay TASSR State Prize laureate in 1959.

== References and notes ==
- "Mansur Mozaffarov/Мансур Мозаффаров". Tatar Encyclopaedia (in Tatar). Kazan: The Republic of Tatarstan Academy of Sciences. Institution of the Tatar Encyclopaedia. 2002.
