= Zeki Velidi Togan =

Bashkir historian and politician

- Әхмәтзәки Вәлиди Туған
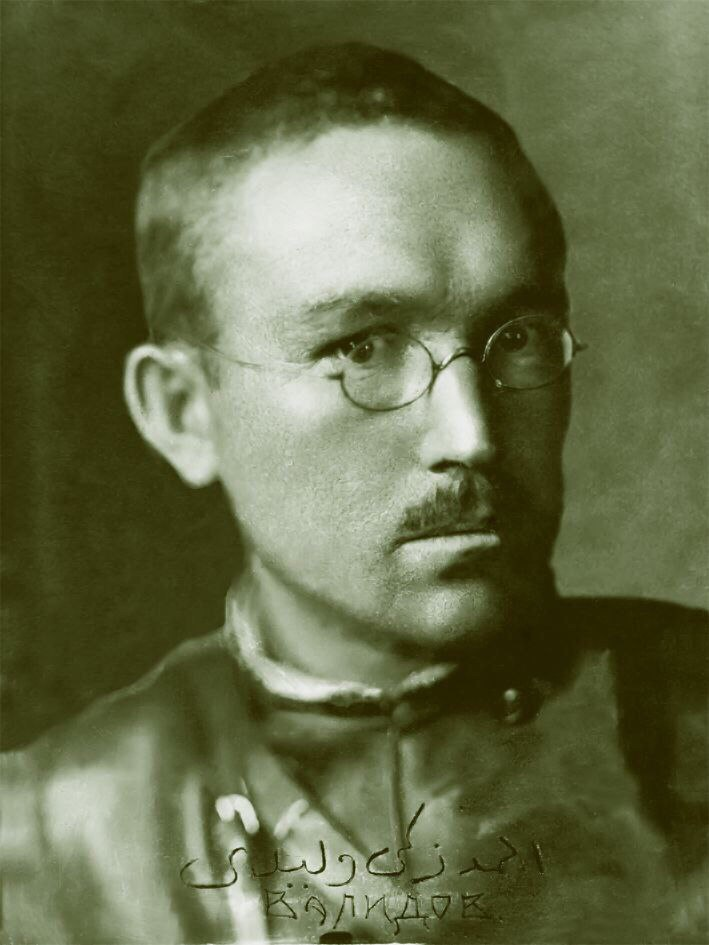
- Born: December 10, 1890; Kuzyanovo, Sterlitamaksky Uyezd, Ufa Governorate, Russian Empire
- Died: July 26, 1970 (aged 79); Istanbul, Turkey
- Citizenship: Russian Empire; Soviet Union; Turkey
- Occupation: historian

Zeki Velidi Togan (Note: Bashkir: Әхмәтзәки Әхмәтшаһ улы Вәлиди, romanized: Äxmätzäki Äxmätşah ulı Välidi, Russian: Ахмет-Заки Ахметшахович Валидов, romanized: Akhmet-Zaki Akhmetshakhovich Validov, Turkish: Ahmet Zeki Velidi Togan) (10 December 1890 – 26 July 1970) was a Turkish-Bashkir historian, Turkologist, and leader of the Bashkir revolutionary and liberation movement, doctor of philosophy (1935), professor, and honorary doctor of the University of Manchester (1967).

== Biography ==
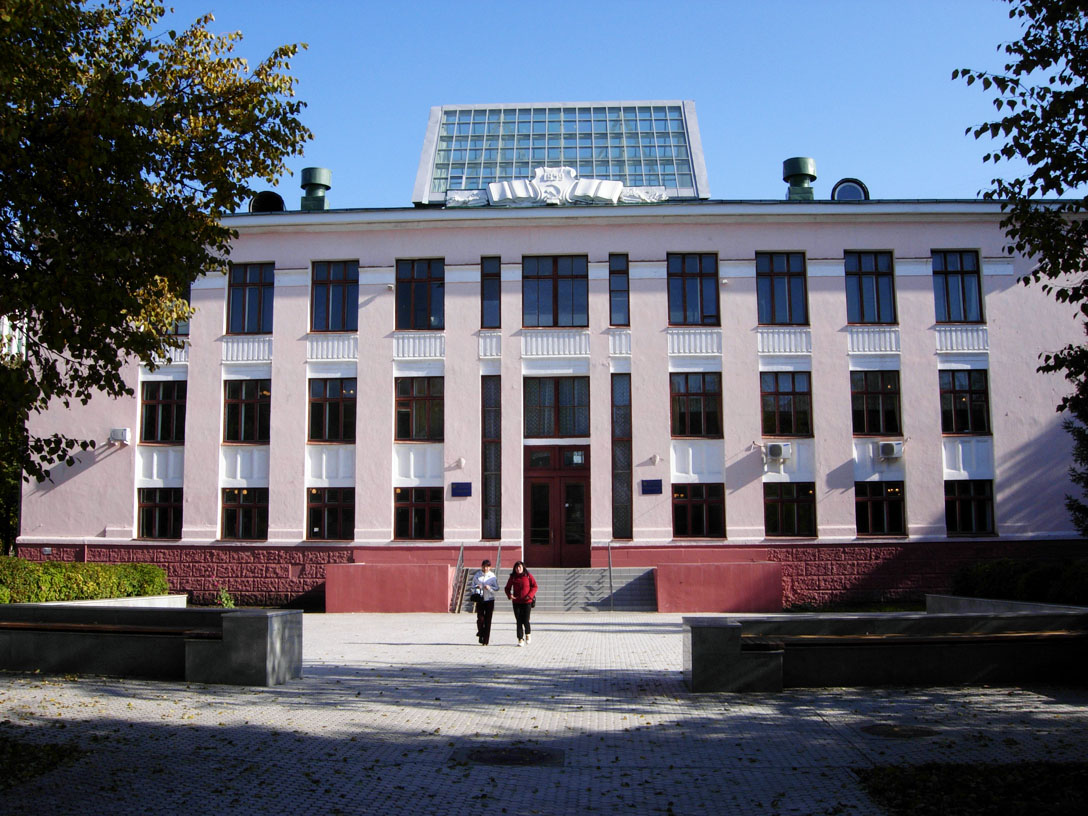
The Zeki Velidi Togan National Library of the Republic of Bashkortostan in Ufa

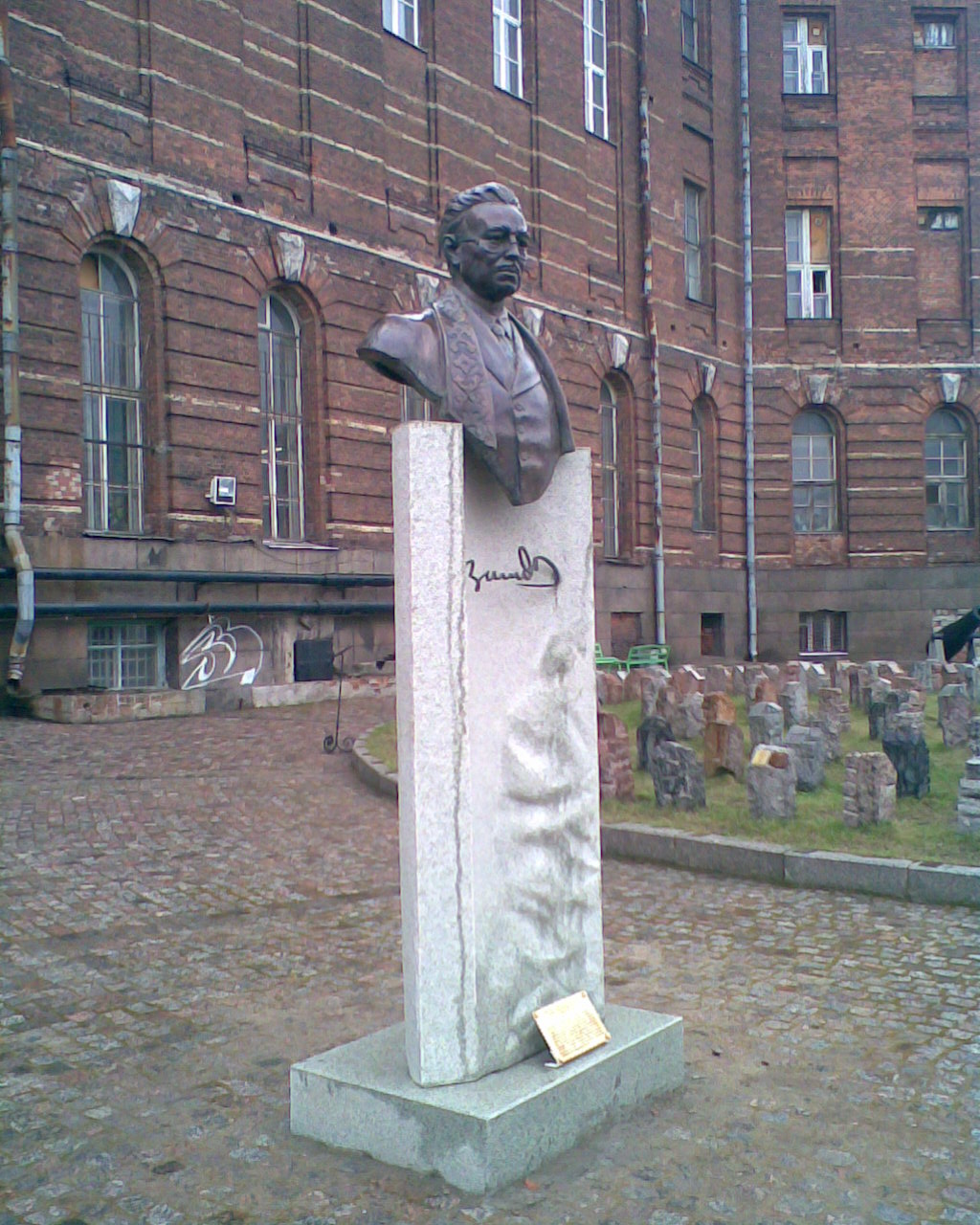
Monument to Zeki Velidi Togan in the yard of Saint Petersburg State University

He was born in Kuzyanovo (Bashkir: Көҙән) village of Sterlitamaksky Uyezd, Ufa Governorate (in present-day Ishimbaysky District, Bashkortostan).

From 1912 to 1915, Velidi taught in the madrasa in Kazan (Qasimiyä), and from 1915 to 1917, he was a member of the bureau, supporting Muslim deputies at the State Duma. In 1917, he was elected to the Millət Məjlisi, and with Şərif Manatov, he organized the Bashkir Shuro (Council). During the Bashkir Congress in Orenburg from December 1917, he declared autonomous Bashkiria. However, he was arrested on 3 February 1918 by the Soviet forces. In April 1918, he escaped and joined the forces confronting the Bolsheviks.

In 1918 and 1919, Velidi's Bashkir troops first fought under Ataman Alexander Dutov, then under Admiral Kolchak against Bolshevik forces. After the RSFSR promised autonomy to Bashkirs, Velidi switched allegiance, fighting with the Bolsheviks.

From February 1919 to June 1920, he was chairman of the Bashrevkom (Bashkir Revolutionary Committee). In September 1920, he attended the Congress of the Peoples of the East held in Baku, where he became involved in drawing up the statutes of ERK, a Muslim Socialist organisation. However, feeling the Bolsheviks had broken their promises, he became more critical of them when he moved to Central Asia.

In Turkistan, Velidi became a leader of the Basmachi Movement. From 1920 to 1923, he was chairman of the "National Union of Turkistan". In April 1923, he was part of a delegation to the British embassy in Mashhad requesting support for the Basmachi, which was met with skepticism by British officials.

In 1923, Velidi emigrated after discovering the original manuscripts of Ahmad ibn Fadlan in Iran.

From 1925, Velidi lived in Turkey and was appointed Chair of Turkish History at the Istanbul University in 1927. However, his controversial views criticizing the Turkish History Thesis at the First Turkish Language Congress in 1932, forced him to seek refuge in Vienna, where he gained a doctor of philosophy at the University of Vienna in 1935. He became a professor at Bonn University (1935–1937) and Göttingen University (1938–1939). On 3 May 1944, protests in support of Nihal Atsız occurred, who was on trial, and on 9 May, he was detained together with other Pan-Turkists like Alparslan Türkeş, Nihal Atsız, and Reha Oğuz Türkkan. In March 1945, he was sentenced to 10 years of hard labor. During the trial, he was accused of having been the chair of Gürem, an organization aimed at forming a military alliance with Nazi Germany in order to liberate the Turkic people living in the Soviet Union. In 1947, a retrial ended with the release of all defendants. In 1953, he became the organizer for the İslam Tetkikleri Enstitüsü (Institute for Islamic Studies) at Istanbul University. In 1967, he was given an honorary doctorate from the University of Manchester. At the same time, he contributed to the Encyclopedia of Turkic Peoples. His articles about culture, language, and the history of Turkic peoples have been translated into many languages.

== Views ==
Velidi was a Turkist and advocate for the removal of Persian cultural influence in the Turkic World, becoming influential in promoting this within the Jadidist movement. In his view, the Turkic peoples had become "imprisoned in the civilization of the Iranians," criticising the speech and literature of the people of Bukhara, Fergana, and Khiva for being intermixed with Persian vocabulary. He believed the Persian influence needed to be removed so that Turkic peoples could find their own "national spiritual wealth."
