= T-pop =

T-pop may refer to:

- Thai pop music
- Taiwanese pop or Hokkien pop
- Turkish pop
- Pop music in Tatarstan
