= Torokul Dzhanuzakov =

Soviet politician

- Kyrgyz: Төрөкул Жанузаков
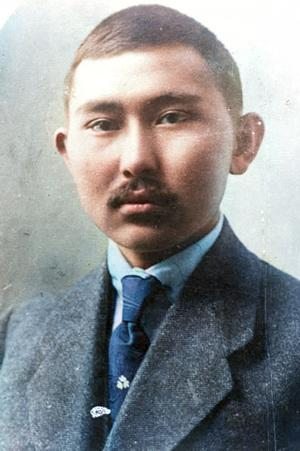

Chairman of the Commission for Refugees
- In office 1920–1921

Deputy Chairman of the Central Executive Committee of the Turkestan Autonomous Soviet Socialist Republic
- In office 1920–1921

Member of the Syrdarya Regional Council
- In office 1917–19??

Personal details
- Born: 1893 Auliye-Ata uyezd, Syr-Darya Oblast, Russian Empire
- Died: 1921 (aged 27–28) Fergana Oblast, Turkestan Autonomous Soviet Socialist Republic, Russian Soviet Federative Socialist Republic
- Party: Communist Party of Turkestan, National Union of Turkestan

Torokul Dzhanuzakov (Kyrgyz: Төрөкул Жанузаков; 1893–1921) was a Kyrgyz Soviet politician; the deputy chairman of the Central Executive Committee of the Turkestan Autonomous Soviet Socialist Republic, chairman of the Commission for Refugees in 1916, one of the main organizers and leaders of the pan-Turk movement in Turkestan, and a member of the secret Turkestan National Union (TMB) political organization.

== Early life ==
Dzhanuzakov and the outstanding statesman of Turkestan Turar Ryskulov had been friends since childhood. Together they graduated from the Merke boarding school in 1909. As the best graduate, Torokul was accepted as an interpreter by the administration to the Governor-General of Turkestan.

Referring to extracts from the diaries of Dmitry Furmanov, Dzhanuzakov actively participated in the uprising of 16th year and was one of its leaders.

During Soviet times Dzhanuzakov was the initiator of the creation and chairman of the Commission for Refugees, participants of the uprising in 1916. He managed to free the local population, who suffered from the punitive operations of the tsarist regime, from taxes, to allocate huge sums of money and other means of material assistance to the population of Turkestan. Using the powers that he has, Dzhanuzakov simultaneously organizes work to investigate the most violent manifestations of the great-power attitude of the kulak population of the Chuy and Issyk-Kul valleys towards the local Kyrgyz. Thus, as a result of the investigation of the brutal murder in 1916, 537 unarmed Kyrgyz people – old men, women and children in the vicinity of the village of Belovodskoye, were sentenced to be executed by the organizers of this crime. Thanks to Dzhanuzakov's determination to implement the measures taken by the authorities to assist refugees returning from China, they immediately returned to their former owners the land occupied during and immediately after the uprising. But later, his concerns about improving the situation of his countrymen were interpreted as "distortions of land policy".

== Career ==
Between the military and political leadership of the Turkestan ASSR, there were contradictions on many issues. Especially for the first two years of the Basmachi movement there was no agreement. Political leadership allowed the criticism of the military for errors and surpluses in the fight against Basmachism in Turkestan. They consisted of a resolute resolution of the struggle against the Basmachi movement, numerous facts of arbitrariness and violence, Red Terror against ordinary people.

Flag of Turkestan

He attended the Congress of the Peoples of the East held in Baku in September 1920, where he had the floor and became involved in drawing up the statutes of ERK, a Muslim Socialist organisation.

At the Samarkand Turkestan National Union Congress sessions held 5–7 September, the by-laws of the society, consisting of twenty-four items, and the flag of Turkistan were approved. In the committee preparing the national flag of Turkestan, Dzhanuzakov served along with Munevver Kari and Zeki Velidi Togan and a few other individuals.

In parallel with participation in the national liberation movement, Torokul Dzhanuzakov engaged in scientific research: he collected folklore and conducted archaeographical and ethnographical research.

== Death ==
Dzhanuzakov was shot by the Cheka authorities in 1921 when he was 28 years old.

Report of the Cheka Plenipotentiary Representative in the Turkestan Republic Yakov Peters to the Presidium of the Cheka of 17 November 1921:

... We are serious about the matter. We had recruited one of the arrested ... gave him the opportunity to the escape, and he is now in Fergana, in the most basmachi setting. Mentioned in the report Dzhanuzakov, who plays in this case, perhaps, the most responsible role, all the time was in Ferghana with the Basmachi. I instructed the agents to catch Dzhanuzakov at any price and left a fairly large sum of money for this purpose. The first attempt was unsuccessful, Dzhanuzakov escaped, but we captured his briefcase with extremely important correspondence, only the trouble is that during the battle the portfolio drowned in the river. Another attempt was successful. Dzhanuzakov was captured, but on the way our detachment was attacked by the Basmachi. Fearing to lose Dzhanuzakov, he was killed by the detachment and we received only his corpse. On another day I received a telegram from Com. Eichmans, that he is managed to find his papers, very valuable, correspondence on the ulemist case, which will be delivered to me in the near future. Although we were aware of the existence of an ulemist organization in Turkestan even before the arrest of the mentioned persons going to the British and Japanese consuls, the question arose immediately: is this organization ulemistic or have we captured elements of several organizations?

— From the history of the organs of state security of the Turkestan Republic. Collection of documents and materials, 1918 – 1924. Issue. 2. – Moscow, 1971. P. 130

== See also ==
- List of unsolved murders (1900–1979)

== Books ==
- Bennigsen, Alexandre A.; Wimbush, S. Enders (1976). Muslim national communism in the Soviet Union: a revolutionary strategy for the colonial world. Chicago: University of Chicago Press. ISBN 0-226-04236-7.
- Velidi Togan, Zeki (2012). Memoirs: National Existence and Cultural Struggles of Turkistan and Other Muslim Eastern Turks. CreateSpace, North Charleston, SC. ISBN 978-1468005684.
- Castagné, Joseph (1925). Les Basmatchis. Le mouvement national des Indigenes d'Asie Centrale depuis la Revolution d'Octobre 1917 jusqu'en Octobre 1924 (in French). Paris: Éditions E. Leroux. p. 15.
