= Verino =

Verino may refer to

- Claudio Verino, an Argentine footballer
- Verino airfield, a Soviet Air Force airfield
