= Vasili Vinogradov =

Russian composer (1874–1948)

Vasili (or Vasily) Ivanovich Vinogradov (Russian: Васи́лий Ива́нович Виногра́дов, IPA: [vɐˈsʲilʲɪj ɪˈvanəvʲɪtɕ vʲɪnɐˈɡradəf]; 1874–1948) was an ethnically Russian Tatar opera composer, violinist and pedagogue, awarded as a Tatar ASSR Honoured Worker of Culture in 1944.

In collaboration with Ğäziz Älmöxämmädev and Soltan Ğäbäşi he composed the first Tatar-language operas, Saniä (1925) and Eşçe (IPA: [e̞ˈɕːe̞]; The Worker, 1930).

Vinogradov also composed many symphonic concertos, based on traditional Tatar and Bashkir music, music for dramatic plays, arrangement of folk music.

== References and notes ==
- "Vasili Vinogardov/Василий Виноградов". Tatar Encyclopaedia (in Tatar). Kazan: The Republic of Tatarstan Academy of Sciences. Institution of the Tatar Encyclopaedia. 2002.
