= Vasily Gordov =

Soviet colonel general (1896–1950)

- Василий Николаевич Гордов
- Born: 12 December 1896; Matveyevka, Menzelinsky Uyezd, Ufa Governorate, Russian Empire
- Died: 24 August 1950 (aged 53); Lefortovo Prison, Moscow, Russian SFSR, Soviet Union
- Burial place: New Donskoy Cemetery
- Military career
- Branch: Russian Imperial Army; Soviet Army
- Service years: 1915–1946
- Rank: Colonel general
- Commands: 67th Rifle Division 21st Army; 1st Reserve Army; Stalingrad Front; 33rd Army; 3rd Guards Army Volga Military District
- Conflicts: World War I; Russian Civil War; World War II; Winter War; Eastern Front; Battle of Kalach; Battle of Stalingrad; Upper Silesian Offensive; Battle of Berlin; Prague Offensive
- Awards: Hero of the Soviet Union

Vasily Nikolaevich Gordov (Russian: Василий Николаевич Гордов; 12 December 1896 – 24 August 1950) was a Soviet Army colonel general and Hero of the Soviet Union. Gordov commanded the Stalingrad Front between July and September 1942.

== Early life ==
Gordov was born on 30 December 1896 in the village of Matveyevka in Ufa Governorate. He was the son of peasants. Gordov joined the Imperial Russian Army in 1915 and was promoted to junior sergeant. He enlisted in the Red Guard in 1917, joining the Red Army in 1918. Gordov ended the Russian Civil War as the commander of the 53rd Rifle Regiment, fighting in the campaign against Nestor Makhno, for which he was awarded the Order of the Red Banner. Between 1925 and 1926, Gordov served as an advisor in the Mongolian People's Army. In 1932, he graduated from Frunze Military Academy and then became the chief of staff of the Moscow Red Banner Infantry School in 1933. He was the chief of staff of the 18th Rifle Division from May 1935 to 1937. In July 1937, Gordov became the commander of the 67th Rifle Division. In July 1939, he became the chief of staff of the Kalinin Military District.

== Winter War and World War II ==
Gordov fought in the Winter War as the 7th Army chief of staff, but was removed from command after alleged failures. He was shifted to the Baltic Military District, where he became its chief of staff. Promoted to major general in June 1940, he was the chief of staff of the 21st Army after Operation Barbarossa and was then its commander from October 1941, fighting in the Battle of Smolensk and the Battle of Kiev. In May 1942, the 21st Army took part in Timoshenko's disastrous Kharkov counteroffensive, but escaped the subsequent encirclement by the German 6th Army. In late June, the 21st Army took part in the Voronezh battle, with a portion of the army encircled by General Hermann Hoth's 4th Panzer Army. During the regrouping of surviving Red Army forces, the remnants of the old Southwest Front, including the battered 21st Army, were grouped in the Stalingrad Front. Timoshenko was recalled to Moscow, and General Gordov installed as the commander of the Stalingrad Front on 23 July 1942.

== Battle for Stalingrad ==
General Gordov directed the withdrawal of the battered survivors of the Kharkov battle behind the line of the Chir River to regroup and receive reinforcements. On 5 August 1942, the Stalingrad Front was split to defend a shortened Pavlovsk-Volga River line-ironically not covering Stalingrad proper despite the name of the Front. The German 6th Army attacked Red Army forces west of the Don River before Gordov could fully organize the defenses, and by 15 August the Stalingrad Front units were largely pushed across the Don River, with the loss of some 43,000 dead, wounded and prisoners, 270 tanks and 600 artillery pieces in the Battle of Kalach. As the disaster was unfolding, General Andrey Yeryomenko (sometimes spelled Eremenko) arrived to take command over a reconstituted South-East Front, with Gordov relegated as Yeryomenko's deputy commander.

== Later life ==
In 1947, Gordov had a conversation with his former chief of staff, Filipp Rybalchenko, in which they made remarks somewhat critical of Stalin's policies. This conversation was sent to Stalin and Gordov was arrested, along with Grigory Kulik and Rybalchenko on charges of attempting to commit terrorist acts against the Soviet government. He was sentenced to death under Article 58 on 24 August 1950 and executed that day in Lefortovo Prison. He was posthumously rehabilitated on 11 April 1956 and his name appears on a memorial.

== Awards and decorations ==
Soviet Union

| Hero of the Soviet Union (6 April 1945) |
| Order of Lenin, twice (21 February 1945, 6 April 1945) |
| Order of the Red Banner, thrice (1921, 27 March 1942, 3 November 1944) |
| Order of Suvorov, 1st class, thrice (9 April 1943, 25 August 1944, 29 May 1945) |
| Order of Kutuzov, 1st class (28 September 1943) |
| Order of the Red Star (22 February 1941) |
| Medal "For the Defence of Stalingrad" (1942) |
| Medal "For the Defence of Moscow" (1944) |
| Medal "For the Liberation of Prague" (1945) |
| Medal "For the Capture of Berlin" (1945) |
| Medal "For the Victory over Germany in the Great Patriotic War 1941–1945" (1945) |
| Jubilee Medal "XX Years of the Workers' and Peasants' Red Army" (1938) |

Czechoslovakia

| Military Order of the White Lion "For Victory", 3rd class |
| War Cross 1939–1945 |
