= Erk (historic party) =

Political party in the Soviet Union

ERK was a socialist party active in Bashkiria, Bukhara and Turkestan from 1919 to 1926. The founding document was written by Validov as part of the preparations for the Baskir Armed forces to switch from the Kolchak to that of the Red Army in February 1919. This led to the foundation of the Bashkir Autonomous Soviet Socialist Republic in March 1919.

== History ==
The party was established when two groups, simultaneously but independently of each other, decided to organize themselves into independent political formations in the Third International. The original groups based in Tashkent and Temjassovo, Bashkiria, were supplemented by activists from Bukhara and Kirghizia following a chance meeting in Moscow in November 1919. They decided to draw up a 12-point programme. Despite obvious signs that their organizing as a separate party would be unacceptable to the Comintern, they nevertheless met in June 1920, and decided to proceed, taking no account of the programme and regulations of the Third International.

During the Congress of the Peoples of the East, their organizational committee met, including Validov and Dzhanuzakov. A new programme of 27 points was hammered out, and Abdulhamid Arifov - at that time the military commissar of the Bukharan People's Soviet Republic - replaced Dzhanuzakov on the committee.

The committee met again 7–10 January 1921, this time in Bukhara, when they changed the name to Turkestan Sosialistlar Tüdesi (Circle of Turkestan Socialists) abbreviated to Tüde. In April that same year, with representatives from Khorezm, the programme was reduced to 9 points. In 1926 the name was changed to Sosialist ERK Firkasi (Socialist Party of Turkestan ERK).
