= Timofey Khryukin =

Soviet military aviator and twice Hero of the Soviet Union

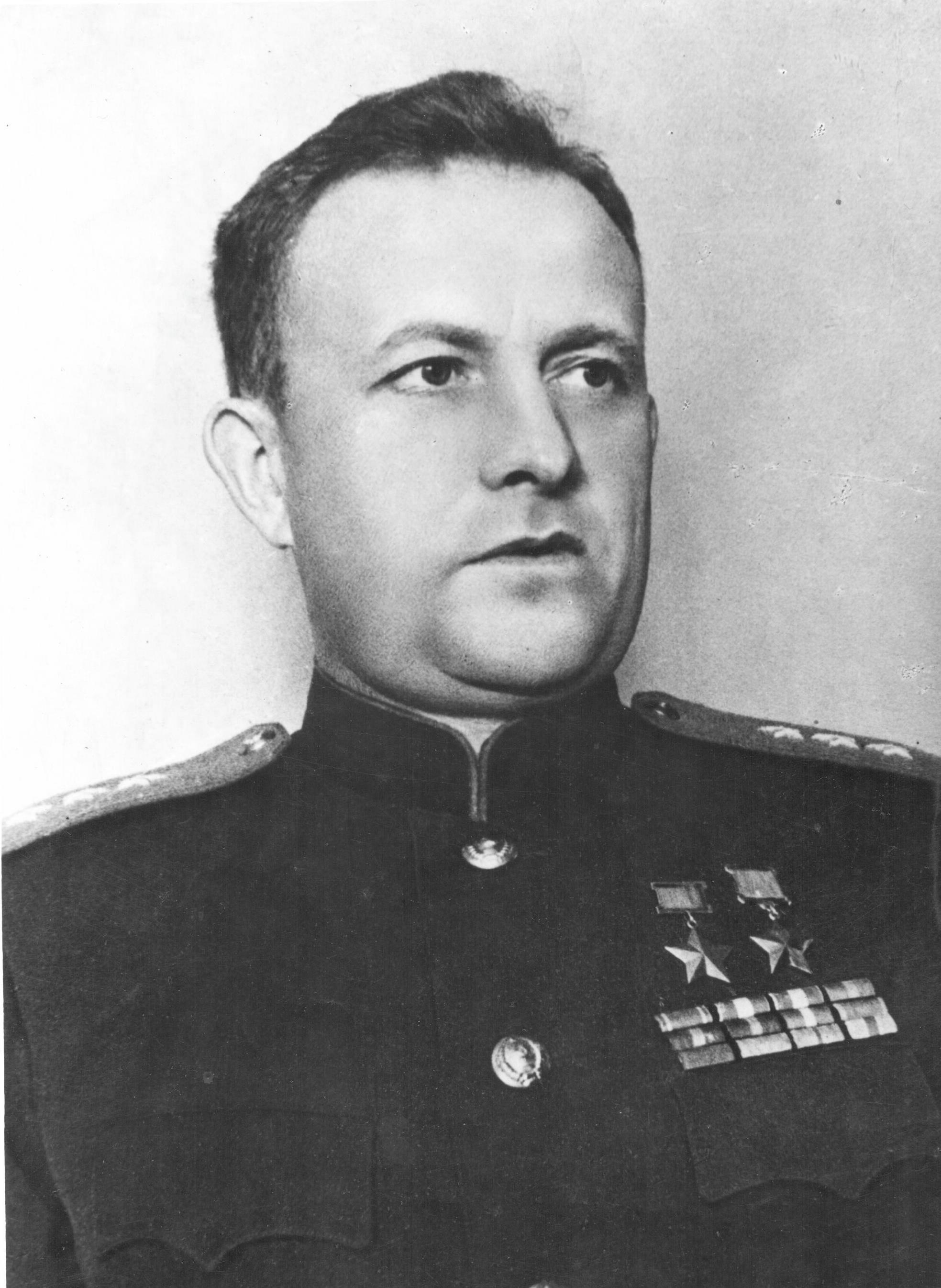
- Born: 21 June [O.S. 8 June] 1910; Yeysk, Russian Empire
- Died: 19 July 1953 (aged 43) Moscow, Soviet Union
- Allegiance: Soviet Union
- Branch: Soviet Air Force
- Service years: 1932 – 1953
- Rank: Colonel-General of Aviation
- Conflicts: Spanish Civil War; Second Sino-Japanese War; World War II; Winter War; Eastern Front
- Awards: Hero of the Soviet Union (twice)

Timofey Timofeyevich Khryukin (Russian: Тимофе́й Тимофе́евич Хрю́кин; 21 June [O.S. 8 June] 1910, in Yeysk – 19 July 1953, in Moscow) was a Soviet aviator, Spanish Civil War volunteer, and colonel-general of the Soviet Air Force. Emerging from an impoverished working-class background, he rose to command the 8th Air Army and 1st Air Army during the Second World War, being twice decorated as a Hero of the Soviet Union before his death following a period of illness caused by a road accident.

== Early life ==
Khryukin was born on 21 June [O.S. 8 June] 1910 in the southern town of Yeysk in the Kuban Oblast (present-day Krasnodar Krai) of Imperial Russia into a poverty-stricken family. Khryukin's father worked a mason; his mother assisted supporting the family as a laundrywoman working for petty wages. At the age of eight he began working for well-off cossacks, but due to abuse he eventually ran off, spending several years wandering the countryside in the years preceding the Bolshevik Revolution. His formal education did not began until at age 15 in the midst of the socialist campaigns to eradicate illiteracy; around that time he found employment in various jobs involving manual labor, including as a porter and railway depot employee.

After joining the Komsomol in 1926, he made his way to regional secretary of the organization and joined the Communist Party of the Soviet Union in 1929. Following a brief stint at an agricultural school, he joined the Red Army and entered flight school in 1932.

== Military career ==
Joining the Red Army in May 1932, he was sent to the Voroshilovgrad Military Aviation School for Pilots in Luhansk, where he trained for eight months. Graduating in December 1933, he became a pilot and flight commander in the 5th Light Bomber Aviation Squadron at Vitebsk in the Belorussian Military District. In December 1935 he was transferred to serve as a flight commander in the 10th High-Speed Bomber Aviation Squadron of the district at Smolensk, flying the Tupolev SB.

Khryukin went to Spain as a volunteer for the Spanish Republican Air Force in October 1936. There he participated in the Spanish Civil War as a Tupolev SB bomber pilot, remaining until March 1937 and receiving the Order of the Red Banner upon his return to the Soviet Union. In March 1937 he became commander of the 13th Separate High-Speed Bomber Aviation Squadron in the Belorussian Military District at Shaykovka, which moved to Shatalovo in mid-1937. Khryukin went to China in March 1938 to lead a squadron of Soviet-piloted Tupolev SB-2 with the Chinese Air Force, sent by the Soviet Union to aid the Chinese forces in the Second Sino-Japanese War. He arrived at the rear airfield of Lanzhou, where an aviation base was created, to which SBs were flown in from Irkutsk across Mongolia and the Gobi Desert. In mid-1938 SBs under Khryukhin's command were credited with severely damaging several Japanese transports carrying aircraft on the Yangtze. While in China he rose to command a bomber group, flying eighteen combat missions on the SB. Khryukin received the title of Hero of the Soviet Union on 22 February 1939. As the Soviet participation in the war in China was secret, his citation was for "exemplary fulfillment of tasks of the government in strengthening the military might of the Soviet Union and for displaying heroism."

Returning to the Soviet Union, Khryukin commanded the SB-equipped 10th High-Speed Bomber Aviation Brigade at Belaya Tserkov in the Kiev Military District. In November 1939 he completed the advanced commander training course at the Military Academy of the General Staff, after which he briefly served as chief of the bomber aviation department of the Air Force Combat Training Directorate. In December 1939 he was sent to command the Air Forces of the 14th Army in the Winter War, a post he remained in until the end of the war in March. In April he became chief of the bomber aviation department of the Air Force Flying Equipment Inspectorate, and in May was promoted to komdiv, becoming Major-General Khryukin of the Air Force when the classic generals' ranks, abolished following the October Revolution, were brought into the Red Army the following month. From July he served as deputy general-inspector of the Air Force Inspectorate. Khryukin completed the advanced commander training course again in May, and was posted to the Kiev Military District as commander of the Air Forces of its 12th Army.

=== World War II ===
Khryukin was appointed commander of the Air Forces of the 12th Soviet Army (based in Ukrainian Soviet Socialist Republic's Kiev Special Military District) on 27 May 1941, twenty-six days before to the German invasion of the Soviet Union. Khryukin was placed in charge of the air units attached the Karelian Front in August 1941: these were tasked with securing the Murmansk Railway and the Kirov Railway, significant to the Soviet military and war effort as the connection between Karelia and the rest of the European territory of the Russian Soviet Federative Socialist Republic. In June 1942 he was reassigned to the Southwestern Front, just in time for the Nazi advance against Stalingrad. The Air Force units of the Southwestern Front were subsequently reformed as the 8th Air Army under Khryukin, as announced by the People's Commissar for Defense on 9 June.

Khryukin's Eight Army participated in the Battle of Stalingrad from the very beginning of the German assault. Stalin personally ordered General Vasily Gordov of the Stalingrad Front to instruct Khryukin to launch a massive aerial assault against the Germans to the right flank of the Soviet forces during a conversation by direct wire on 23 July 1942. A less-than-desirable number of aircraft translated into insufficient resources for aerial reconnaissance, while Il-2 Shturmovik units had to fly without fighter escort. Although it could not stop the German forces from advancing into the city, the 8th Air Army would continue to provide key support during the Battle of Stalingrad until the battle turned in the Soviets favor. In early October Khryukin decided to form a regiment within the 8th Air Army composed of elite fighter pilots, to be led by World War II ace Lev Shestakov, a fellow Spanish Civil War veteran; the unit became the prestigious 9th Guards Fighter Aviation Regiment. By the end of 1942, Khryukin increased the count of enemy aircraft pilots had to destroy in order to attain the status of ace; simultaneously, he promised a recommendation for the Hero of the Soviet Union title to each of those who could succeed in doing so. On 30 December 1942 the 8th Air Army became part of the Southern Front; Khryukin's efforts turned in the direction of Rostov and the Donbas, where major Soviet victories followed the surrender of Germany's Stalingrad forces after the success of the Soviet counterattack – Operation Little Saturn – in early 1943.

With successful Soviet advances in the Donbas, Khryukin's airmen won praise from Stalin, who called for artillery salvoes to commemorate the Soviet triumph in Moscow in September 1943. After supporting the Red Army on the Mius River and in the retaking of the Donbas region of eastern Ukraine, the 8th Air Army lent air superiority to the Soviet offensive in Crimea in April 1944.

Khryukin took charge of the 1st Air Army from Colonel-General Mikhail Gromov's command in July 1944, following his promotion to colonel-general in May. Its performance under the freshly transferred Khryukin during Operation Bagration in Belarus was noted as "excellent" by Marshal of the Soviet Union Vasilevsky, an eyewitness, in his memoirs, The Matter of My Whole Life (1973). Khryukin commanded the 1st Air Army for the remainder of the war, leading it for the remainder of the war and commanding it during the key Battle of Königsberg in the last stages of the war (6–9 April 1945). His second Hero of the Soviet Union title was awarded on 19 April 1945, ten days following the Soviet victory in the offensive.

=== Postwar ===
Khryukin remained in command of the 1st Air Army until July 1946 before appointed as deputy commander of training of the Soviet Air Force from 1946 to 1947; after that he commanded the 7th Air Army. In 1950 he graduated from the Voroshilov Academy of the General Staff of the Armed Forces of the USSR. His health was seriously undermined by a car accident after the war, although his life was saved by a successful surgery. He died of progressive nephritis on 19 July 1953 and was buried in Novodevichy Cemetery.

== Awards and honors ==
- Twice Hero of the Soviet Union (22 February 1939 and 19 April 1945)
- Order of Lenin (22 February 1939)
- Three Order of the Red Banner (2 February 1937, 7 May 1940, and 20 April 1953)
- Order of Bogdan Khmelnitsky 1st class (19 March 1944)
- Order of Suvorov 1st and 2nd class (1st class - 16 May 1944; 2nd class - 17 September 1943)
- Two Order of Kutuzov 1st class (8 February 1943 and 4 July 1944)
- Order of the Patriotic War 2nd class (23 November 1942)
- Order of the Red Star (6 November 1947)
- Legion of Honour (31 May 1944)
- Croix de Guerre (June 1945)
- Order of the Cloud and Banner 4th class (1938)
