= Keçe Solabaş =

Keçe Solabaş Кече Солабаш
- Selo
- Location within Tatarstan
- Country: Russia
- Region: Tatarstan
- District: Vysokogorsky District
- Time zone: UTC+3:00

Keçe Solabaş (Tatar: Кече Солабаш, romanized: Keçe Solabaş, Russian: Малый Сулабаш) is a rural locality (a derevnya) in Vysokogorsky District, Tatarstan. The population was 181 as of 2010.

== Geography ==
Keçe Solabaş is located 28 km northwest of Biektaw, the district's administrative centre, and 54 km north of Qazan, the republic's capital, by road.

== History ==
The earliest known record of the settlement dates from 1635.

From the 18th century to the first half of the 19th, the village's residents belonged to the social estate of state peasants.

By the beginning of the twentieth century, Solabaş had a mosque, a mekteb and a small shop.

Before the creation of Tatar ASSR in 1920, it was a part of Qazan Uyezd of Qazan Governorate. Since 1920, it has been a part of Arça Canton, after the creation of districts in Tatar ASSR (Tatarstan) in Döbyaz (1930–1963), Yäşel Üzän (1963–1965), and Biektaw districts.

== Notable people ==
The village is the birthplace of Xäsänğata Ğäbäşi, a religious and public figure and turkologist and his son, Soltan Ğäbäşi.
