= Cäwdät Fäyzi =

Fäyzullin Cäwdät Xaris ulı (Tatar: Фәйзуллин Җәүдәт Харис улы, pronounced [fæɪˈzulʲin ʑæʊˈdæt xæˌrisuˈlɯ]) aka Cäwdät Fäyzi (Җәүдәт Фәйзи [ʑæʊˈdæt fæɪˈzɪ], anglicized as Jaudat Faizi; Russian: Файзи́ (Файзу́ллин) Джауда́т Хари́сович Fayzi (Fayzullin) Dzhaudat Kharisovich; 1910–1973) was a Tatar composer and folklorist. People's Artist of Tatar ASSR (1964), Tatar ASSR (1944) and RSFSR (1957) Honoured Worker of Culture.

In 1939-1941 Fäyzi was a chief of musical division and conductor in Tatar Academic Theatre, in 1944–1947, 1952-1957 he was a chief and artistic leader of Tatar Philharmonic Society.

Major works: opera The Unshipped Letters (1960), 4 musical comedy (including the most famous My Slippers), more than 200 song and romance, arrangement of folk songs. Fäyzi also is known as a collector of Tatar musical folklore. His works include articles on Tatar musical culture, librettos, plays, novels and poetry. Ğabdulla Tuqay Tatar ASSR State Prize laureate (1966).
