= Soltan Ğäbäşi =

Tatar composer, musicologist and choirmaster

Ğäbäşi Soltanäxmät Xäsänğata ulı a.k.a. Soltan Ğäbäşi (1891 – 1942) was a Tatar composer, musicologist and choirmaster.

He was born in the village of Keçe Solabaş near Döbyaz, then a part of Qazan Uyezd, Qazan Governorate, Russian Empire (now Biektaw District of Tatarstan).

In collaboration with Vasili Vinogradov and Ğäziz Älmöxämmädev he composed first Tatar operas, Saniä (1925) and Eşçe (The Worker) (1930), vocal and instrumental concertos, arrangement of folk songs. As musicologist, he is known by his articles, devoted to Tatar musical culture.

Soltan Ğäbäşi was a son of theologian and historian Xäsänğata Ğäbäşi.
