= Xäsänğata Ğäbäşi =

Tatar religious leader and historian

- Хәсәнгата Габәши (Tatar); Хасан-Гата Габяши (Russian)
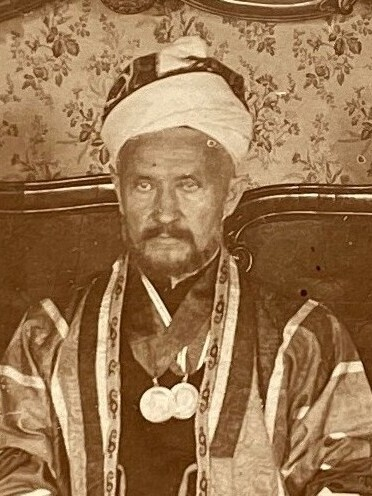
- Ğäbäşi in 1911
- Born: 11 January 1863; Malyy Solabash, Kazansky Uyezd, Kazan Governorate, Russian Empire
- Died: 7 August 1936 (aged 73); Malyy Solabash, Dubyazsky District, Tatar ASSR, Russian SFSR, Soviet Union
- Occupations: Qadi; historian; turkologist
- Children: Soltan Ğäbäşi

Qadi Xäsänğata Möxämmät ulı Ğäbäşi (Note: Often transliterated as Khasan-Gata Mukhammetovich Gabyashi through a Russified Romanization of Хасан-Гата Мухамметович Габяши.) (has-ann-GAH-TAH ga-ba-SHEE; Tatar: Хәсәнгата Мөхәммәт улы Габәши; 11 January 1863 – 7 August 1936) was a Tatar religious leader, qadi, historian, and turkologist.

== Early life and education ==
Ğäbäşi was born on 11 January 1863 in the village Keçe Solabaş, modern-day Tatarstan to an educated family. He received his first Islamic education from his father and grandfather.

In 1876, at the age of 11, he was enrolled into a madrasa of the Äcem Mosque, Kazan. After his 17-year long studies, he taught there for 5 years. His education, which excluded secular studies, and later work would focus a lot on Islamic theological disputes. He learned Russian, geography, history, and other studies outside the madrasa in parallel to his theological education.

== Career ==
In 1889, after having spent time learning and teaching at the Ğaffariya madrasa, he leaves it, continuing to teach in Kazan. During this time, he writes books, some focusing on education or history. The next year, he returned to Keçe Solabaş.

Back in his hometown, Ğäbäşi serves as an imam-khatib at the local mosque. He receives the title Akhund in 1894.

In 1895, Ğäbäşi accepts the invitation to serve as a qadi at the Orenburg Muslim Spiritual Assembly. During this time, the Assembly positioned itself as Jadidist and Ğäbäşi continues his writings. His progressive views make him a contentious figure, and he thus moves back to his hometown, opening a madrasa, and continuing his teaching and imamship.

At some point, he is elected to the presidium of the All-Russian Congress of Muslims.

After the Russian Revolutions, interest in Islamic education grows again, and the Assembly appoints Ğäbäşi to be a qadi again. Afterwards, he opens a boarding school for poor children, the "Home of Labour", and creates the "Society of Muslims", a charity organization.

In January 1932, he was arrested and sent to community service in Arkhangelsk Oblast. In 1936, he was released because of health complications. He died and is buried on 7 August 1936 in Keçe Solabaş.

== Views ==
As Muslim cleric and educator, Ğäbäşi supported the presence of music and poetry in Islamic society.

== Selected bibliography ==
Ğäbäşi's bibliography consisted of different works, some tackling Islamic law, others tackling hygiene and health. Some of these included:

- Тәрбияле бала ("Well-Mannered Child")
- Басыйрәт ("Consciousness")
- Сагълык ("Health")
- Ысуле фикъх тарихы ("Fiqh History Basics")
- Хөласа әл-Бәян ("The Essence of Explanations")
- Төрек ыруглары ("Turkic Peoples")
- Мохтасар тарихе кауме төрки ("Short Story of the Turkic Nation")
- Шигырь вә гыйна хакында голяма вә фикъһе исламының фикерләре ("The Views of Islamic Scientists and Lawyers Regarding Poems and Music")
