= Birsky Uyezd =

Birsky Uyezd (Бирский уезд) was one of the subdivisions of the Ufa Governorate of the Russian Empire. It was situated in the northern part of the governorate. Its administrative centre was Birsk.

== Demographics ==
At the time of the Russian Empire Census of 1897, Birsky Uyezd had a population of 497,696. Of these, 52.7% spoke Bashkir, 28.4% Russian, 13.3% Mari, 4.3% Udmurt, 1.0% Tatar and 0.2% Turkmen as their native language.
