= Zlatoustovsky Uyezd =

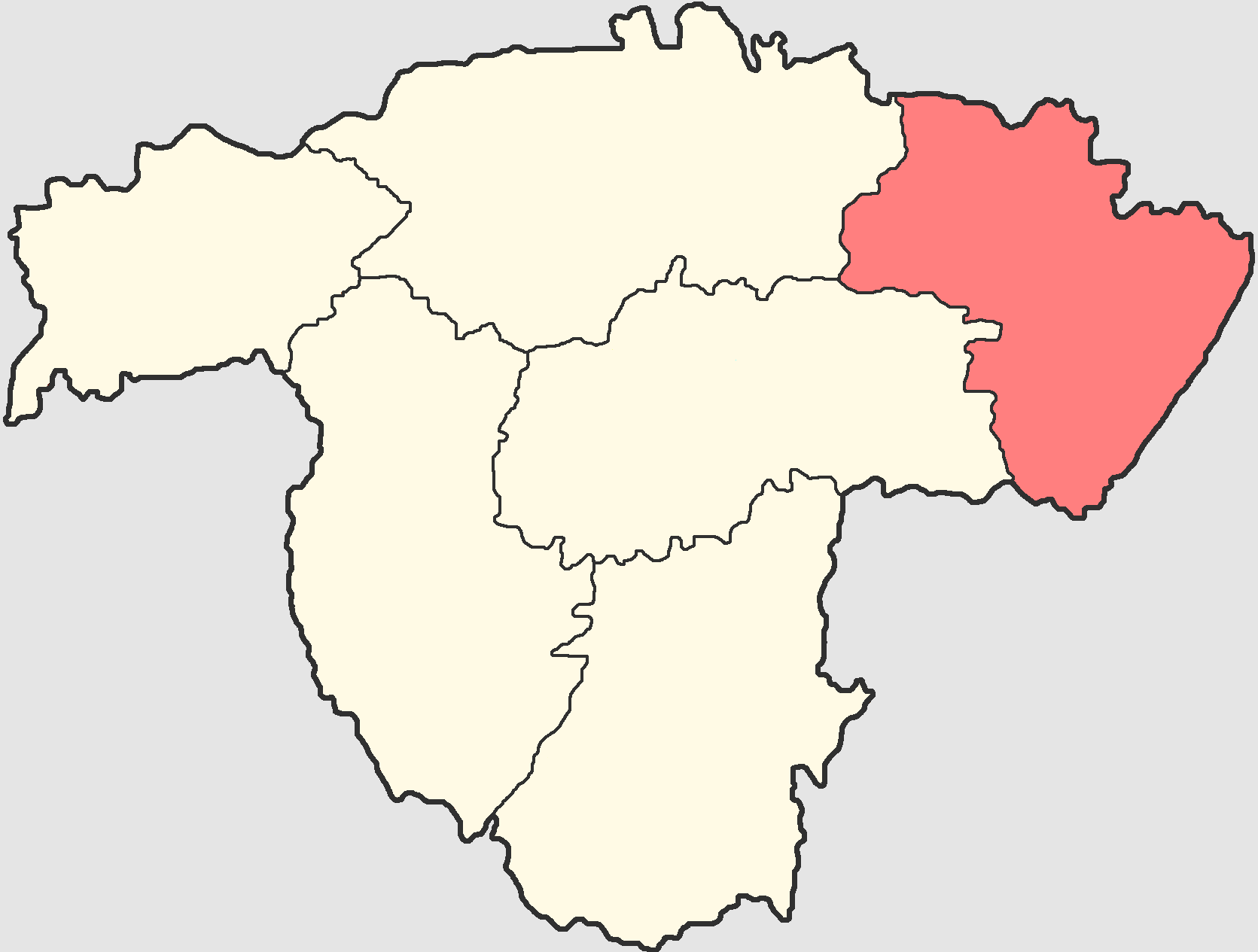
Zlatoustovsky

Zlatoustovsky Uyezd (Златоустовский уезд) was one of the subdivisions of the Ufa Governorate of the Russian Empire. It was situated in the northeastern part of the governorate. Its administrative centre was Zlatoust.

== Demographics ==
At the time of the Russian Empire Census of 1897, Zlatoustovsky Uyezd had a population of 185,498. Of these, 65.5% spoke Russian, 27.7% Bashkir, 5.2% Tatar, 1.2% Mordvin, 0.1% German and 0.1% Polish as their native language.
