= Verino airfield =

Former Soviet Air Force airfield based in Khabarovsk Krai, Russia

Verino
- IATA: none; ICAO: XHHP

Summary
- Airport type: Military
- Owner: Ministry of Defence
- Operator: Russian Air Force
- Location: Pereyaslavka, Khabarovsk Krai
- Built: Unknown
- In use: Unknown
- Elevation AMSL: 279 ft / 85 m
- Coordinates: 47°59′52″N 135°05′20″E

Map
- Location in Primorsky Krai

Runways
Direction	Length		Surface
Direction	ft	m	Surface
03/21	8,204	2,500	Concrete

Verino airfield was a Soviet Air Force based in Khabarovsk Krai, Russia located 5 km (3 mi) northeast of Pereyaslavka, Russia and about 35 miles (55 km) south of Khabarovsk. Verino was an 1st Air Army airfield, with the 300 and 302nd Bomber Aviation Regiment a mainstay in later years.

== History ==
The United States Air Force first spotted the airfield during Lockheed U-2 overflights in March 1958. Analysts found a 7,600 x 150' runway but could not see much detail. Later missions revealed as many as 93 aircraft parked on the ramps, most of them Mikoyan-Gurevich MiG-17s (ASCC "Fresco"). Around 1970, upgraded aircraft, the Sukhoi Su-15 (ASCC "Flagon,") had arrived, though MiG-17s were still based here.

By the 1980s, the airfield's interceptor role had diminished and many of the aircraft were replaced with tactical and attack aircraft. These included the Sukhoi Su-24 (ASCC "Fencer") and Mikoyan MiG-27 Flogger.
