= Muraptal =

Muraptal Мураптал
- Village
- Location within Bashkortostan Location within Russia
- Coordinates: 52°26′N 55°48′E
- Country: Russia
- Region: Bashkortostan
- District: Kuyurgazinsky District
- Time zone: UTC+5:00

Muraptal (Russian: Мураптал; Bashkir: Мораптал, Moraptal) is a rural locality (a village) in Muraptalovsky Selsoviet, Kuyurgazinsky District, Bashkortostan, Russia. The population was 41 as of 2010. There is 1 street.

== Geography ==
Muraptal is located 10 km southeast of Yermolayevo (the district's administrative centre) by road.

== Paleontology ==
Fossils of temnospondyl amphibians Parotosuchus and Inflectosaurus were found in Lower Triassic (Upper Olenekian) deposits of this location.
