= Ufimsky Uyezd =

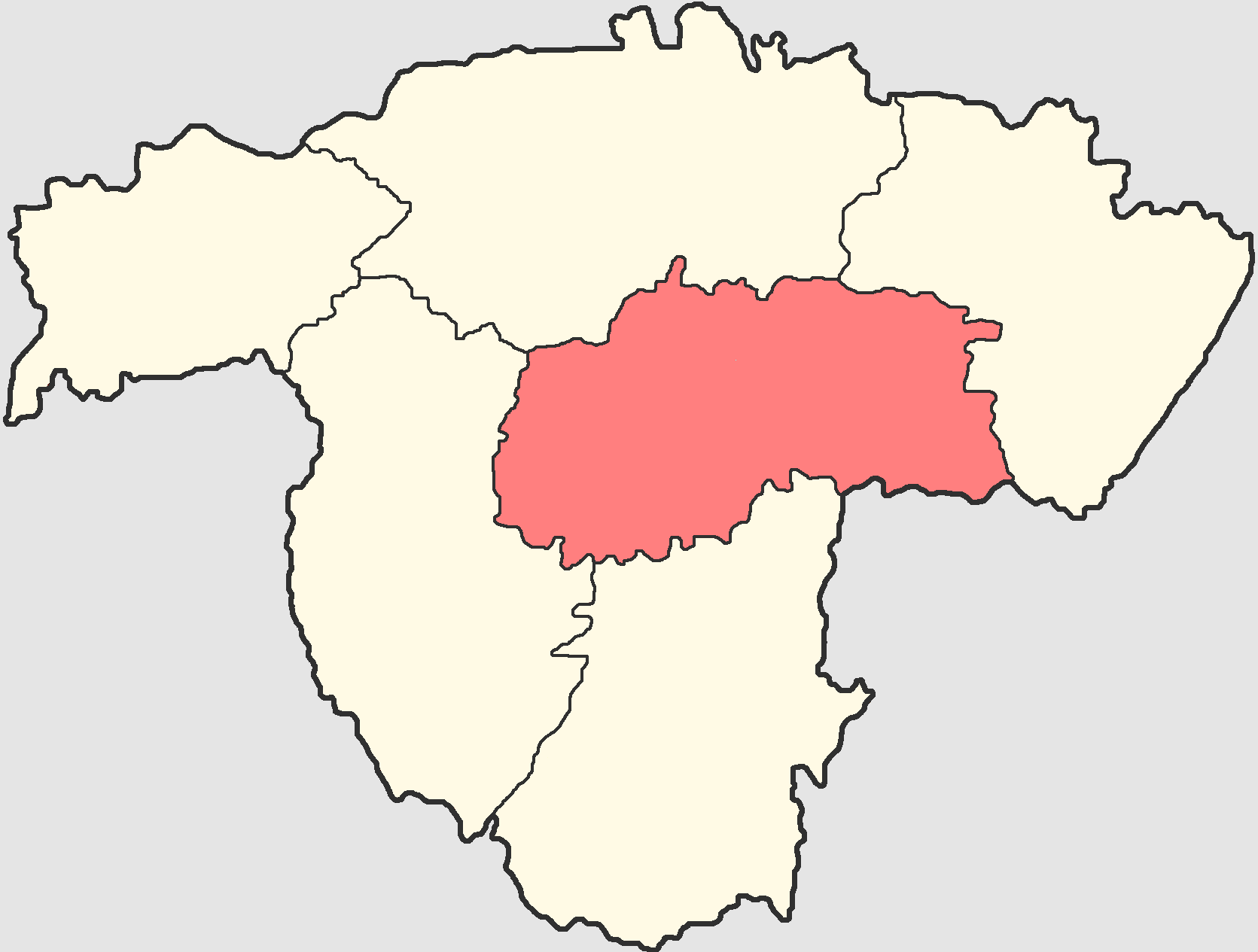
Ufa district on the map of Ufa province

Ufimsky Uyezd (Уфимский уезд) was one of the subdivisions of the Ufa Governorate of the Russian Empire. It was situated in the central part of the governorate. Its administrative centre was Ufa.

== Demographics ==
At the time of the Russian Empire Census of 1897, Ufimsky Uyezd had a population of 372,906. Of these, 61.2% spoke Russian, 30.7% Bashkir, 3.9% Tatar, 1.1% Mari, 1.0% Mordvin, 0.6% Chuvash, 0.4% Latvian, 0.3% Ukrainian, 0.2% Polish, 0.1% Udmurt, 0.1% Yiddish, 0.1% Turkmen, 0.1% German and 0.1% Belarusian as their native language.
