= 8th Air Army =

- Active: 1942–1949
- Disbanded: 10 January 1949
- Country: Soviet Union
- Branch: Air Force

The 8th Air Army was a military formation of the Soviet Air Forces, active from around 1942 to 1949.

It was formed June 13, 1942, by order of the State Defence Committee (NKO) Number 00119 dated June 9, 1942, on the basis of the Air Forces of the Southwestern Front.

Since its formation it was part of the South-Western Front. During the Battle of Stalingrad, it was a part of the South-Eastern, then (from July 12, 1942) Stalingrad Front. Later, as part of the Southern Front (October 20, 1943, it renamed 4th Ukrainian). During the Lvov-Sandomierz Operation it was part of the 1st Ukrainian Front.

The VVS Southwestern Front was reorganised as the 8th Air Army on 9 June 1942. Most units (including the 8th Assault Aviation Corps and the 10th Fighter Aviation Corps, and the 321st Bomber Aviation Division) were transferred to the Air Forces (VVS) of the Kiev Military District in April 1946. On 9 April 1946 it was renamed 2nd Air Army DA, and transferred to Vinnytsia, Vinnytsia Oblast. In 1946 the 2nd Air Army DA comprised the 2nd Guards Bomber Aviation Corps (2nd and 13th Guards Bomber Aviation Divisions) and the 4th Guards Bomber Aviation Corps (14th and 15th Guards Bomber Aviation Divisions). On 10 January 1949 2nd Air Army DA was redesignated 43rd Air Army DA.

== Army Commanders ==
- May 15, 1942 - July 2, 1944 : Major General of Aviation, Lieutenant General of Aviation (since March 1943) Timofey Khryukin
- August 2, 1944 - until the end of the war : Lieutenant General of Aviation Vasily Nikolaevich Zhdanov.
