= Utyaganovo =

Utyaganovo Утяганово
- Village
- Location within Bashkortostan Location within Russia
- Coordinates: 53°23′N 58°18′E
- Country: Russia
- Region: Bashkortostan
- District: Abzelilovsky District
- Time zone: UTC+5:00

Utyaganovo (Russian: Утяганово; Bashkir: Үтәгән, Ütägän) is a rural locality (a village) in Amangildinsky Selsoviet, Abzelilovsky District, Bashkortostan, Russia. The population was 447 as of 2010. There are 7 streets.

== Geography ==
Utyaganovo is located 30 km northwest of Askarovo (the district's administrative centre) by road. Ishkildino is the nearest rural locality.
