= Music in Tatarstan =

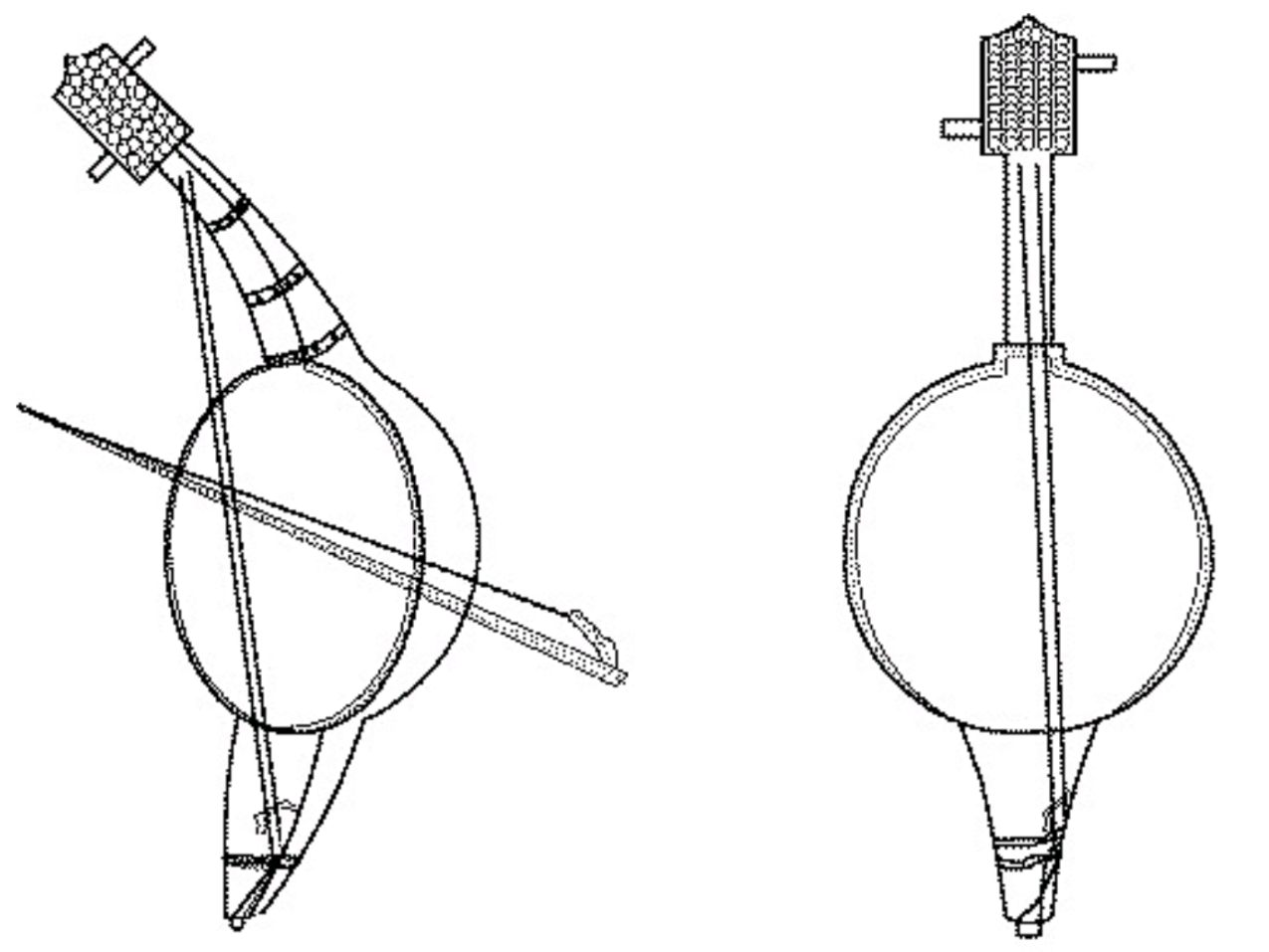
A Tatar musical instrument called a Kylqubiz

Tatarstan is an autonomous republic within Russia, where the largest ethnic group are the Tatars. Their traditional music is a mixture of Turkic, Mongolic and Finno-Ugric elements, reportedly bridging Mongolian and Hungarian music. Nonetheless, the most distinguishing feature of Tatar music is the pentatonic scale, which aligns it with the Mongolian, Chinese and Vietnamese musical traditions. Instrumental dance music, secular song and sacred music are all a part of Tatar folk music. Instrumentation includes the kubyz (jaw harp), surnay, quray (flute) and garmon-talianka.

In the mid-20th century, a number of Tatar composers became renowned, including Cäwdät Fäyzi, Salix Säydäş, Mansur Mozaffarov and Näcip Cihanov. Many of the works of the Russian-Tatar composer Sofia Gubaidulina have been inspired by Tatar music.

The largest center of Tatar national music is the Jalil Opera and Ballet Theatre named after Musa Cälil. The first Tatar opera, Saniä, was staged in 1925. It was composed by Soltan Gabashi in collaboration with Vasili Vinogradov. Farit Yarullin was the creator of the first Tatar ballet, Şüräle. Modern Tatar music includes practically all existing basic musical genres. Almaz Monasypov is one of the first Soviet Tatar composers re-embodied in modern music the ancient layers of the national tradition like baits (Tatar: бәет), munajats (Tatar: мөнәҗәт) and book singing (Tatar: китап көе).

Modern, non-traditional music includes pop, rock, hip-hop music (for example, İttifaQ), etc. One of the most remarkable artists, who obtained her own niche in Tatar music was the renowned world music singer and composer Zulya Kamalova. One of the most outstanding examples of contemporary Tatar music is the rock opera The Wanderer in Bulgar – an amalgamation of Tatar Folk Music, the Tatar Opera tradition and western rock music arrangements with Russian rock prints. Tatar pop singers Alsou (who sings in English, Russian and Tatar) and Zemfira (Bashkortostan-born who sings mostly in Russian) were among the most popular musical performers in Russia in 1990s and 2000s. Later, partly Tatar-speaking music projects Aigel and Tatarka (member of award-winnig Little Big band) gained popularity. The National Tatarstan Orchestra is the major symphony orchestra in Tatarstan.
