= Varfolomeyevka (village), Primorsky Krai =

Rural locality in Yakovlevsky District, Primorsky Krai, Russia

Coordinates: 44°18′N 133°26′E

Varfolomeyevka (Russian: Варфоломе́евка) is a village (selo) in Yakovlevsky District of Primorsky Krai, Russia. Population: 1,300 (2005 est.).

The village hosts the 799th Reconnaissance Aviation Regiment of the 11th Air Army of the Russian Air Force.

A railway station of the same name, incorporated as a separate inhabited locality, is located in the vicinity of the village.
