= Staromusino =

Staromusino Старомусино
- Village
- Location within Bashkortostan Location within Russia
- Coordinates: 54°21′N 55°56′E
- Country: Russia
- Region: Bashkortostan
- District: Karmaskalinsky District
- Time zone: UTC+5:00

Staromusino (Russian: Старомусино; Bashkir: Иҫке Муса, İśke Musa) is a rural locality (a village) and the administrative centre of Staromusinsky Selsoviet, Karmaskalinsky District, Bashkortostan, Russia. The population was 580 as of 2010. There are 8 streets.

== Geography ==
Staromusino is located 17 km west of Karmaskaly (the district's administrative centre) by road. Novomusino is the nearest rural locality.
