= Kalinovka, Russia =

Kalinovka (Russian: Кали́новка) is the name of several rural localities in Russia, including the following:

- Kalinovka, Khomutovsky District, Kursk Oblast, a selo in Khomutovsky District of Kursk Oblast; birthplace of Nikita Khrushchev
- Kalinovka, Oktyabrsky District, Kursk Oblast, a khutor in Oktyabrsky District of Kursk Oblast
- Kalinovka, Timsky District, Kursk Oblast, a village in Timsky District of Kursk Oblast
- Kalinovka, Zheleznogorsky District, Kursk Oblast, a village in Zheleznogorsky District of Kursk Oblast
