= Stalingrad Front =

Military unit of the Red Army (1942–1943)

- Active: July 12, 1942 - January 1, 1943
- Country: Soviet Union
- Branch: Red Army
- Type: Army Group Command
- Size: Several Armies
- Engagements: World War II; Case Blue; Battle of Stalingrad

Commanders
- Notable commanders: Semyon Timoshenko; Vasiliy Gordov; Andrey Yeryomenko

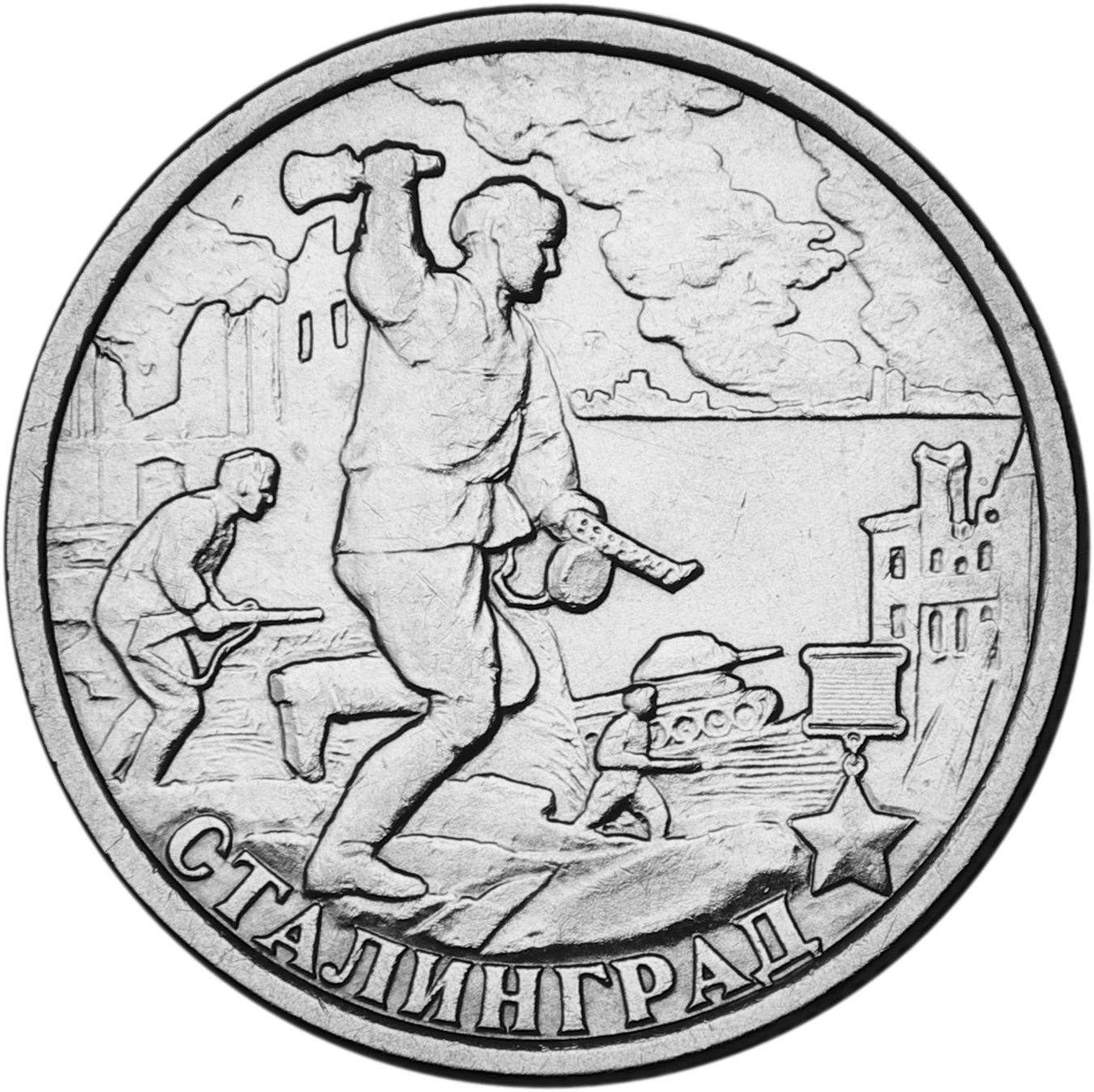

The Stalingrad Front was a front, a military unit encompassing several armies, of the Soviet Union's Red Army during the Second World War. The name indicated the primary geographical region in which the Front first fought, based on the city of Stalingrad on the Volga River.

== Formation ==
By order of the Stavka on July 12, 1942, Stalingrad Front was formed, under the command of Marshal S.K. Timoshenko, with N.S. Khrushchev as member of the Military Council and Gen. P.I. Bodin as chief of staff. Ostensibly this was simply a renaming of the now-dissolved Southwestern Front, but in fact was a largely new formation, as the only effective units under its command were the new 62nd, 63rd and 64th Armies, formed from the 7th, 5th and 1st Reserve Armies, respectively. The armies of the former front had been badly battered and partly encircled in the German Operation Wilhelm (June 10–15), Operation Fridericus II (June 22–25), and the opening stages of Operation Blue (began June 28) and the remnants were in retreat towards the east bank of the Don River. The new front was ordered to hold a defensive line within the great bend of the Don, roughly between Kletskaya and the confluence of the Chir and the Don, preparing for the oncoming German Sixth Army.

On July 22, Stalin concluded that Timoshenko was no longer capable of effective command, and called Lt. Gen. V.N. Gordov to Moscow, appointing him to command of the front effective July 23. Khrushchev and Bodin remained in their respective posts. At this time Stalingrad Front had eight armies under command: the above-mentioned had been joined by the 51st, 57th, 21st, 28th and 38th Armies, of which the last four were in particularly poor condition. The remnants of 28th Army were being rebuilt as the 4th Tank Army, while 38th was similarly rebuilding as 1st Tank Army. The front also commanded 8th Air Army and the Volga River Flotilla.

== Defence of Stalingrad ==
On July 23, Sixth Army began a pincer operation with its XIV and XXIV Panzer Corps against 62nd Army. By the end of the next day two rifle divisions of the army had been pushed aside to the north, the army's right flank had been deeply penetrated and partly encircled in the Maiorovsky region before the advance had to be slowed due to supply difficulties and Soviet resistance. Stalin ordered the half-formed tank armies into the attack against the northern pincer, which began on the 25th. While these attacks were too disjointed to achieve decisive results, by the next day German progress was halted, with Soviet tanks breaking into the rear of XIV Corps, and a 35 km gap remaining between the pincers. The rebuilding 21st Army joined the counterstroke that day as well.

During the remainder of the month these actions continued to stymie the German advance and wear down their strength, and also relieve the partially-encircled Soviet force, although at considerable cost in men and vehicles. On July 28, the STAVKA released an additional nine fresh rifle divisions to the front from the Reserve of the Supreme High Command. Two days later, Lt. Gen. V.I. Chuikov was reassigned from the command of 64th Army to Gordov's deputy commander of the front; Lt. Gen. M.S. Shumilov took over command of the 64th.

On August 1, the order of battle of the Stalingrad Front was as follows:

- 21st Army (1 Guards rifle and 11 rifle divisions, most rebuilding) - Mjr. Gen. A.I. Danilov
- 51st Army (4 rifle divisions, 2 cavalry divisions) - Mjr. Gen. Trofim Kolomiets
- 57th Army (1 Guards rifle and 1 rifle division, and 1 anti-tank brigade) - Mjr. Gen. Fyodor Tolbukhin
- 62nd Army (1 Guards rifle and 5 rifle divisions) - Mjr. Gen. V.Ya. Kolpakchi
- 63rd Army (1 Guards rifle and 5 rifle divisions) - Lt. Gen. V.I. Kuznetsov
- 64th Army (6 rifle divisions and 2 rifle brigades) - Lt. Gen. M.S. Shumilov
- 1st Tank Army (3 tank corps, 1 tank brigade and 2 rifle divisions) - Mjr. Gen. K.S. Moskalenko
- 4th Tank Army (1 tank corps, 2 rifle divisions and 1 anti-tank brigade) - Mjr. Gen. V.D. Kriuchenkin
- 8th Air Army - Col. Gen. Timofey Khryukin
- 7th Sapper Army

By August 4, the STAVKA recognized that the size of this front could not be controlled effectively from one headquarters, and so created the new Southeastern Front, to take command of the southern sectors of the front. After some considerable discussion, Col. Gen. A.I. Yeryomenko was given command of Southeastern Front, leaving Gordov in command of the truncated Stalingrad Front. Yeryomenko was given responsibility for the defense of the city itself, and also held a supervisory role over Gordov.

On September 3, the dispositions and strengths of the armies of Stalingrad Front were as follows:

- 63rd Army (Babka to the Khoper River) - six rifle divisions with about 45,000 men;
- 21st Army (The Khoper River to the Ilovlia River - 11 rifle divisions, one tank destroyer brigade, and three separate tank battalions, with about 60,000 men;
- 4th Tank Army (The Ilovlia River to Kotluban) - five rifle divisions and one tank and one motorized rifle brigade, with about 40,000 men;
- 24th Army (Kotluban to 564 km Station) - five rifle divisions and one tank brigade, with about 50,000 men;
- 1st Guards Army (564 km Station to the Motor Tractor Station) - eight rifle divisions and three tank corps, with about 80,000 men;
- 66th Army (The Motor Tractor Station to the Volga River) - six rifle divisions and four tank brigades, with about 60,000 men.

Armor strength: 350 - 400 tanks.

By September 28, Stalingrad and Southeastern Fronts had been reinforced to the extent that another reorganization was ordered. Don Front was created, with the 63rd, 21st, 4th Tank, 1st Guards, 24th and 66th Armies, under command of Lt. Gen. K.K. Rokossovsky, who was transferred from command of Bryansk Front; Gordov was removed to the STAVKA reserves. Southeastern Front was disbanded, and Yeryomenko was put in command of the reorganized Stalingrad Front, with under his command

- 62nd Army (Vasily Chuikov),
- 64th Army (Mikhail Shumilov),
- 57th Army (Fyodor Tolbukhin),
- 51st Army (Nikolai Trufanov),
- 28th Army (Vasyl Herasymenko).

This command structure would remain for the duration of the battle.

== Counteroffensive from Stalingrad ==
As of November 19, Stalingrad Front commanded five field armies, plus the 8th Air Army (Timofey Khryukin). On January 1, 1943, Stalingrad Front was renamed as the new Southern Front.
