= Menzelinsky Uyezd =

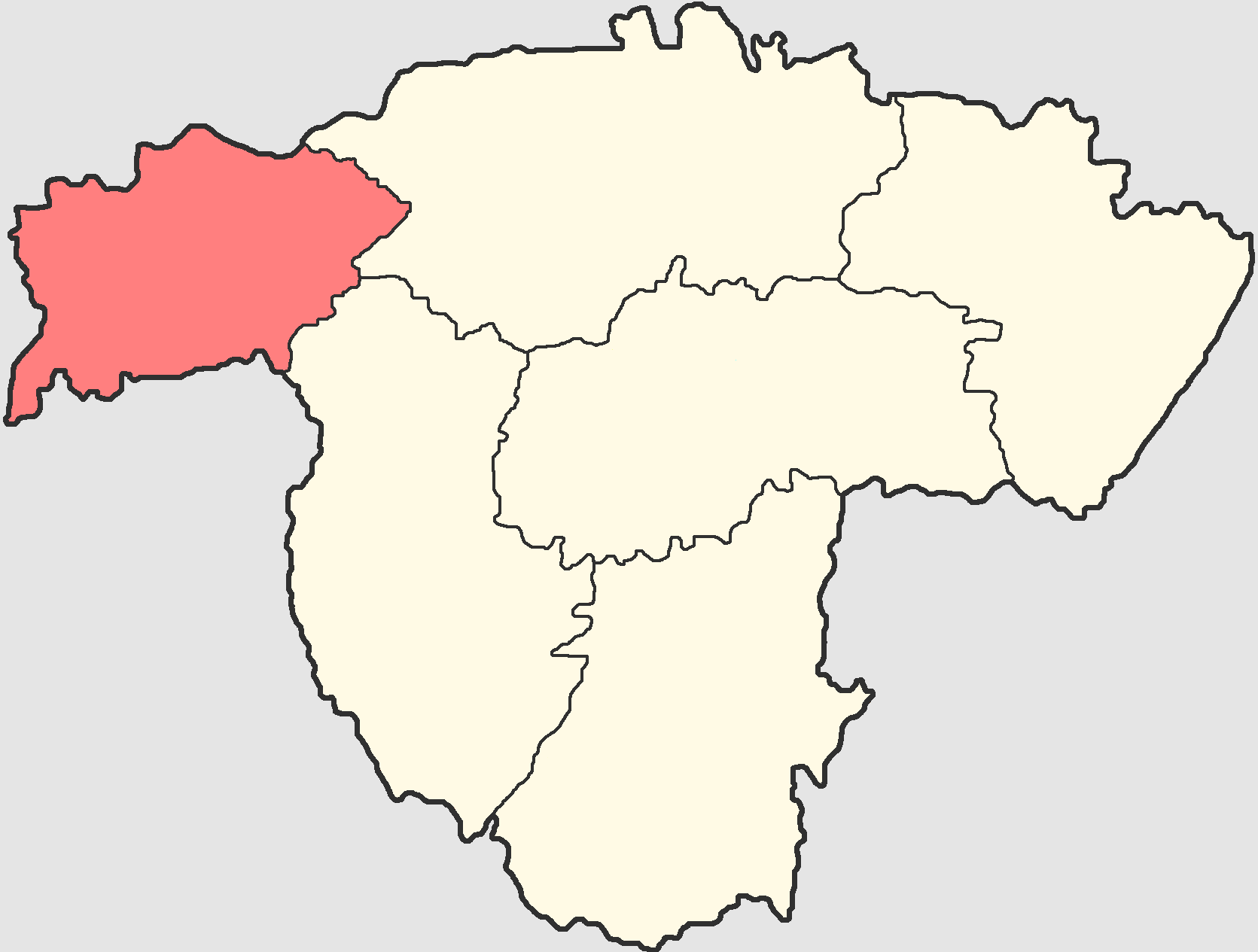

Menzelinsky Uyezd (Мензелинский уезд) was one of the subdivisions of the Ufa Governorate of the Russian Empire. It was situated in the northwestern part of the governorate. Its administrative centre was Menzelinsk.

== Demographics ==
At the time of the Russian Empire Census of 1897, Menzelinsky Uyezd had a population of 379,981. Of these, 32.6% spoke Russian, 32.4% Bashkir, 32.1% Tatar, 1.2% Mordvin, 0.8% Chuvash, 0.7% Mari and 0.1% Turkmen as their native language.
