= Sterlitamaksky Uyezd =

Sterlitamaksky Uyezd (Стерлитамакский уезд) was one of the subdivisions of the Ufa Governorate of the Russian Empire. It was situated in the southern part of the governorate. Its administrative centre was Sterlitamak.

== Demographics ==
At the time of the Russian Empire Census of 1897, Sterlitamaksky Uyezd had a population of 327,382. Of these, 39.8% spoke Russian, 35.4% Bashkir, 11.1% Tatar, 7.3% Chuvash, 4.9% Mordvin, 0.6% Latvian, 0.5% Ukrainian and 0.1% Turkish as their native language.
