= Tatar Encyclopaedia =

Encyclopedic dictionary

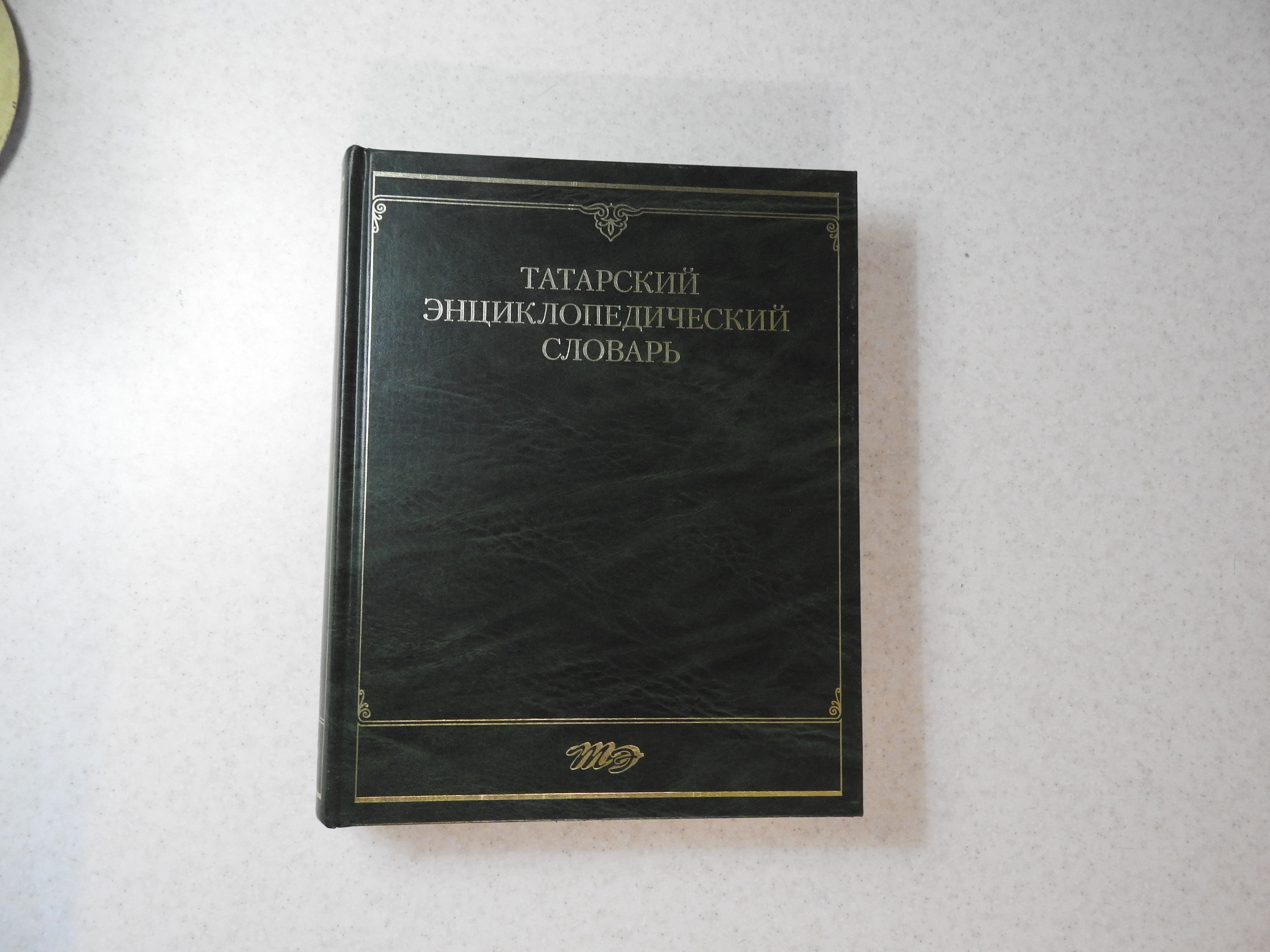

Tatar Encyclopaedic Dictionary (Tatar: Татар энциклопедия сүзлек, romanized: Tatar entsiqlopediyä süzlek; ТЭС) is the first encyclopaedic dictionary published in Tatar language about history of Tatarstan and the Tatar people. The publication is produced by Tatar Encyclopedia Institute of the Republic of Tatarstan Academy of Sciences.

Originally prepared and published in Russian in 1999, Tatar-language version of Tatar Encyclopaedic Dictionary was made available in 2002.

…publication of Tatar Encyclopaedic Dictionary is a long-awaited event. This is a materialization of a dream shared by many generations of scientific intelligentsia of our republic, beginning with Kayum Nasiri, Shihabetdin Marjani, Rizaetdin Fakhretdin… We have finally proved that we are capable of developing and publishing such a wonderful reference.

— Mintimer Shaimiev, Presentation of Tatar Encyclopedic Dictionary at Tatarstan Academy of Sciences, Kazan, Nov.3, 1999

Tatar Encyclopedia Institute further started work on developing multi-volume Tatar Encyclopaedia (in Russian – vol.1 in 2002, vol.2 in 2005, vol.3 in 2006, vol.4 in 2008 & vol.5 in 2010: in Tatar – vol.1 in 2008; vol.2 in 2011; vol.3 in 2012), Tatarstan: Illustrated encyclopedia (in Russian, 2013). The responsible editor for the encyclopedia is Gamirjan S. Sabirjanov.

Tatar Encyclopaedia Institute founding director, TES and Tatar Encyclopedia's founding editor-in-chief M. Kh. Khasanov died in 2010.
