= Ufa Governorate =

1865–1922 unit of Russia

Coordinates: 54.7333°N 55.9667°E

Ufa Governorate Уфимская губерния (Russian)
- Governorate of the Russian Empire (1865–1917), Russian Republic, Russian State (1918), and RSFSR (1918–1922)
- 1865–1922
- Coat of arms

- Location within the Russian Empire
- Capital: Ufa
- Area
  - (1897): 122,005 km^{2} (47,106 sq mi)
- Population
  - (1897): 2,220,497
- History
  - Established: 1865
  - Disestablished: 14 June 1922
- Political subdivisions: uezds: 6
Preceded by
Orenburg Governorate
Succeeded by
Bashkir Autonomous Soviet Socialist Republic
Russian State
Tatar Autonomous Soviet Socialist Republic
Bashkiria

Ufa Governorate (Note: Russian: Уфи́мская губе́рния, romanized: Ufimskaya guberniya; Bashkir: Өфө губернаһы, romanized: Öfö gubernahı) was an administrative-territorial unit (guberniya) of the Russian Empire with its capital in the city of Ufa. It was created in 1865 by separation from Orenburg Governorate. On June 14, 1922, the governorate was transformed into the Bashkir Autonomous Soviet Socialist Republic. It occupied an area of 122,005 square kilometres (47,106 sq mi) and the territory of governorate was divided to six uyezds.

== Population ==
According to the 1865 data, the population of Ufa Governorate was 1,291,018. According to the 1897 Census it was 2,220,497; urban population was 48.9%. Bashkir people constituted 41% of total population; Russian people: 38%; Tatar people: 8.4%; Mari people: 3.7%; Chuvash people: 2.8%; Mordvins: 1.7%.

== Economy ==
Arable lands was about 35% of the governorate's total area. Industry was based on mining and metalworking; there were also food, clothing and timber industries.

== Administrative division ==
Ufa Governorate consisted of the following uyezds (administrative centres in parentheses):

- Belebeyevsky Uyezd (Belebey)
- Birsky Uyezd (Birsk)
- Zlatoustovsky Uyezd (Zlatoust)
- Menzelinsky Uyezd (Menzelinsk)
- Sterlitamaksky Uyezd (Sterlitamak)
- Ufimsky Uyezd (Ufa)

== Notable people ==
- Guinan Khairy was a Bashkir poet, writer and playwright.
- Shaikhzada Babich was a Bashkir poet, writer and playwright.
- Potapy Emelianov priest and confessor of the Russian Greek Catholic Church and, since 2003, a candidate for Roman Catholic Sainthood.
- Baryi Kalimullin was a Russian architect, educator, and social activist.

== Sources ==
- Энциклопедический словарь Брокгауза и Ефрона: В 86 томах (82 т. и 4 доп.). — СПб., 1890–1907.
