= Gerhardt's Mill =

Historic building in Volgograd, Russia

Coordinates: 48.7155°N 44.5329°E

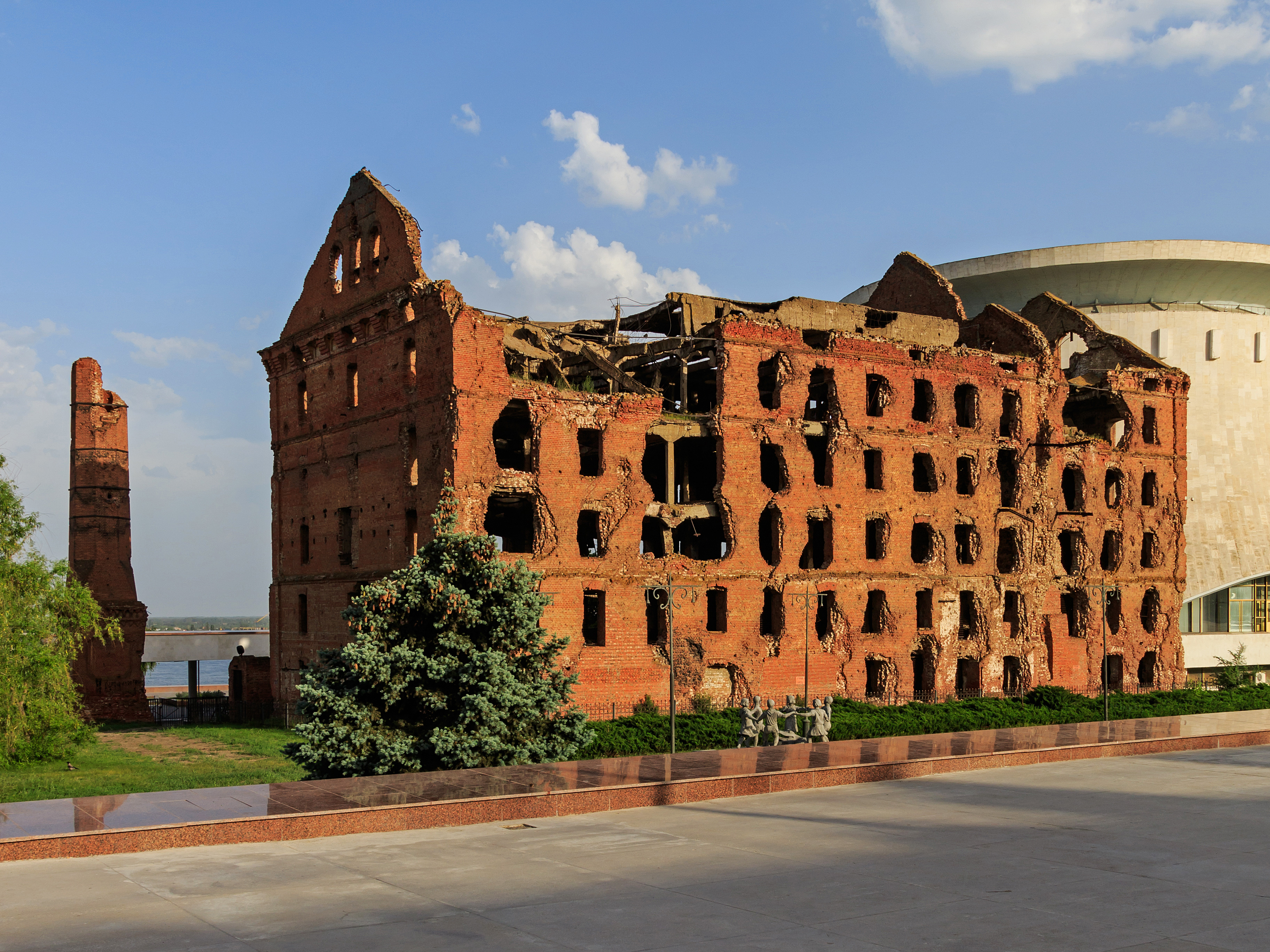
The ruins of the mill today

Gerhardt's Mill (Russian: ме́льница Ге́ргардта, romanized: mél'nitsa Gérgardta) is a building of historical significance in the Battle of Stalingrad.

Gerhardt's Mill is situated directly across from Pavlov's House in central modern-day Volgograd. It is preserved in its bombed-out state and is one of the main landmarks of the Battle of Stalingrad. The mill provided a vital role in the Defense of Stalingrad. The building had a twin on the floodplain of the Tsaritsa River, which also survived the battle with significant damage.

It is one among only three buildings that were not restored or repaired from the battle era, along with the command post of the 138th Division on Lyudnikov Island and the building of the factory laboratory of the Krasny Oktyabr plant.

== History ==
In 1899 the Gerhardt family of entrepreneurs received permission to build a flour-grinding complex in what is now central Volgograd, overlooking the River Volga. The mill was put into operation, and flour sales began in August 1900. The mill operated until a devastating fire in August 1907 destroyed the complex. A new building was built on the same site by May 1908. Despite being called a "mill", it served as a food processing complex, where in addition to the mill, there was a smokery for fish, butter production facilities, a bakery, and warehouses for finished products.

The technical equipment used the most advanced technologies of its time: it had its own generator, which gave independence from the city power grid, its own boiler house, from which the brick smokestack has survived, and internal mechanical conveyors, from which there are still broken remnants. In 1911 the company "Gerhardt and heirs" employed 78 workers, with 165 working days per year, with a working day of 10.5 hours. Their salary for the year was 10,342 rubles. The annual turnover of the business was 1,270,000 rubles. After the 1917 revolution, the mill was collectivized and nationalized, designated Number 4 among the Stalingrad mills.

== Battle of Stalingrad ==
During the Battle of Stalingrad, Gerhardt's Mill became the final frontier, with the Soviet Red Army deterring the army of German Field Marshal Friedrich Paulus on the approaches to the Volga. Fierce fighting for the mill lasted for several months: it was bombed, and blown up numerous times. The German Army failed to take it, or pass around it.

The building was semi-surrounded for 58 days, and during those days it sustained numerous hits from air bombs and shells. This damage can be seen today. Every square meter of the exterior walls was cut by shells, bullets and shrapnel, and the reinforced concrete beams on the roof were broken by direct hits from aircraft bombs. Hundreds of cubic meters of very high-quality brickwork and reinforced concrete were blown out of the building.

The sides of the building testify to the different intensities of mortar and artillery fire – minimal on the Volga side, on the three other sides traces of firing from all types of artillery can be seen, as well as loopholes in the window openings made by the defenders of the house. The increased strength and vibration resistance of the reinforced concrete frame, necessary for the operation of industrial equipment of the mill, helped prevent the building from being razed to the ground.

== Gallery ==
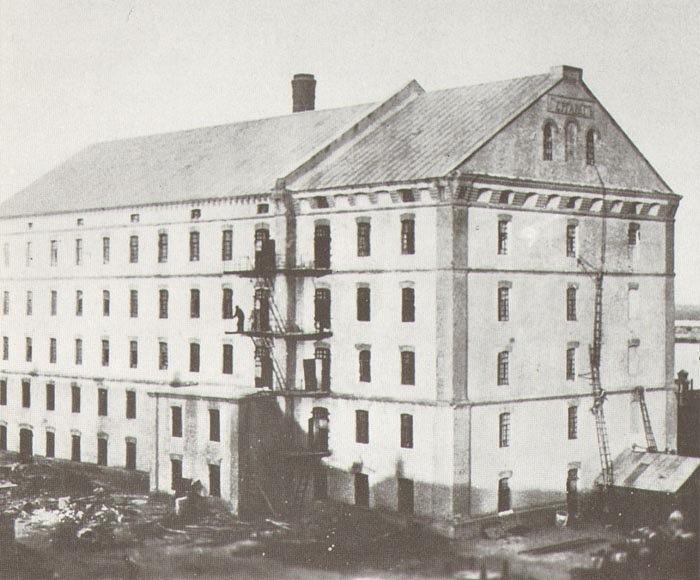
The original building

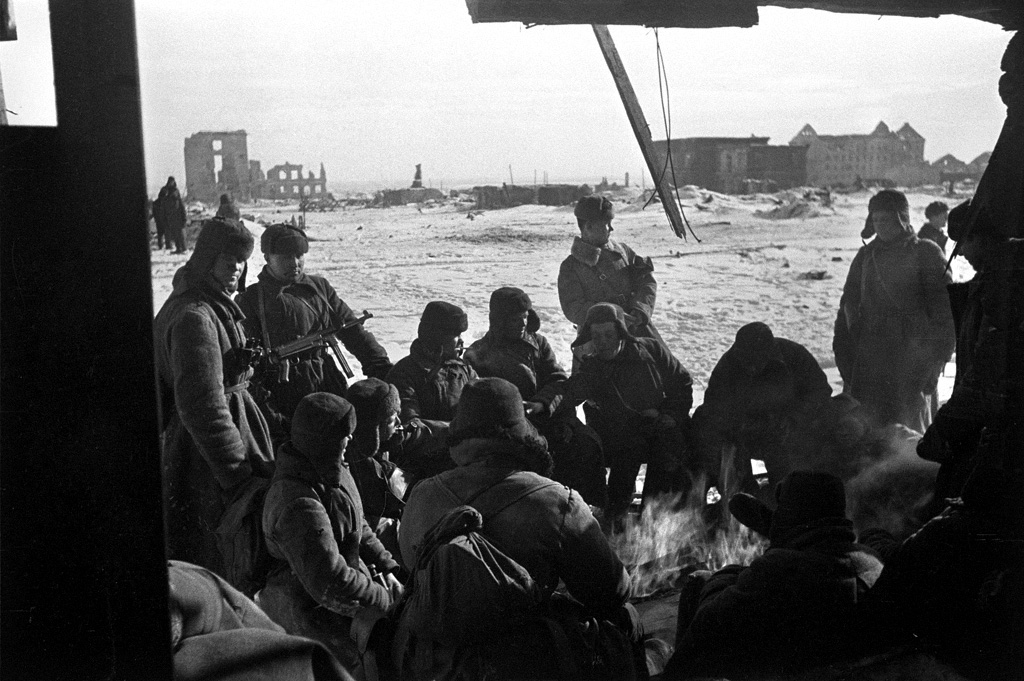
Soviet troops during a lull in the fighting. The mill can be seen in the distance on the right.

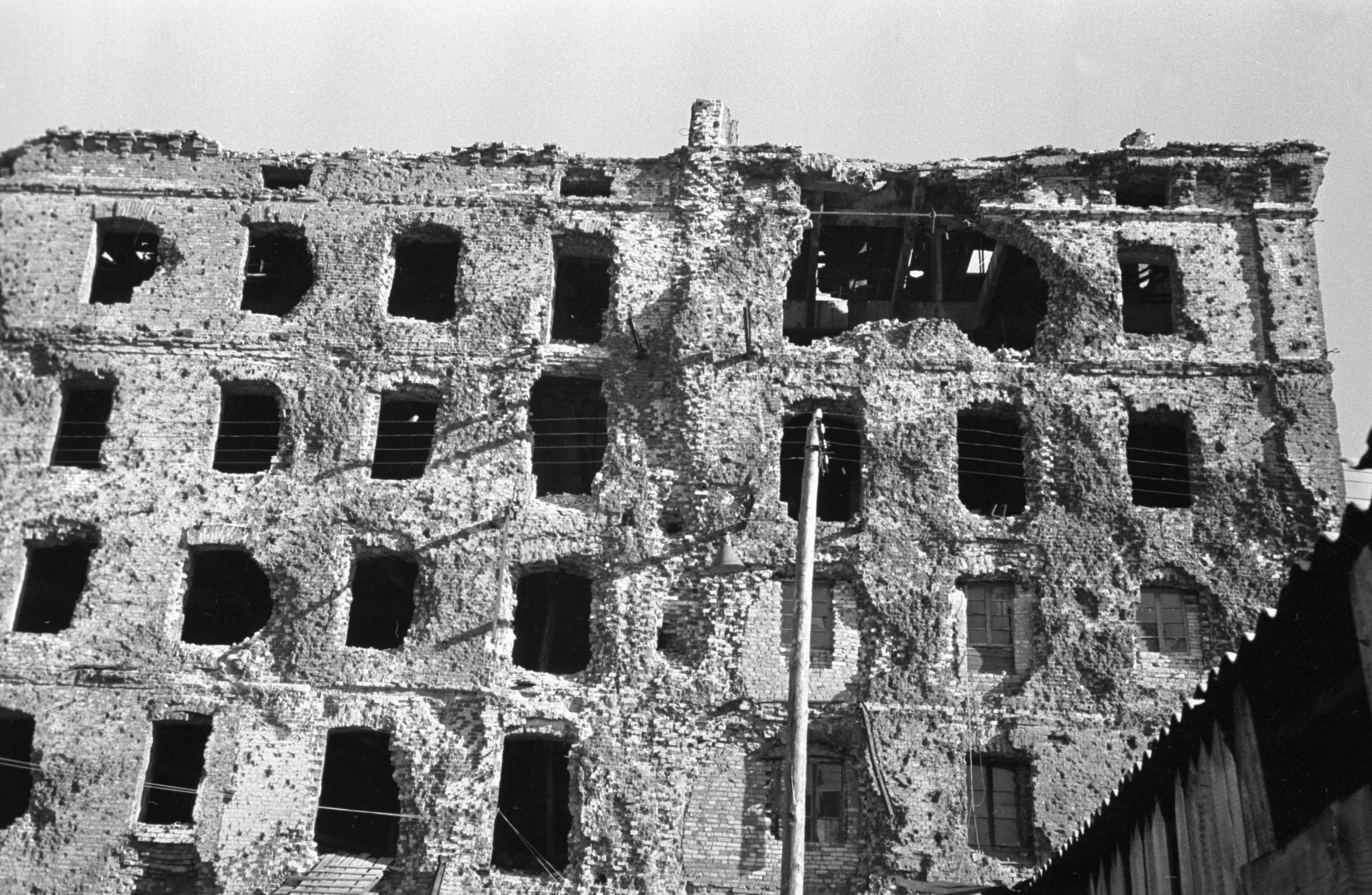
The mill after the battle of Stalingrad
