= Volgograd Metrotram =

Metrotram network in Volgograd, Russia

Волгоградский скоростной трамвай Volgograd Rapid Tram

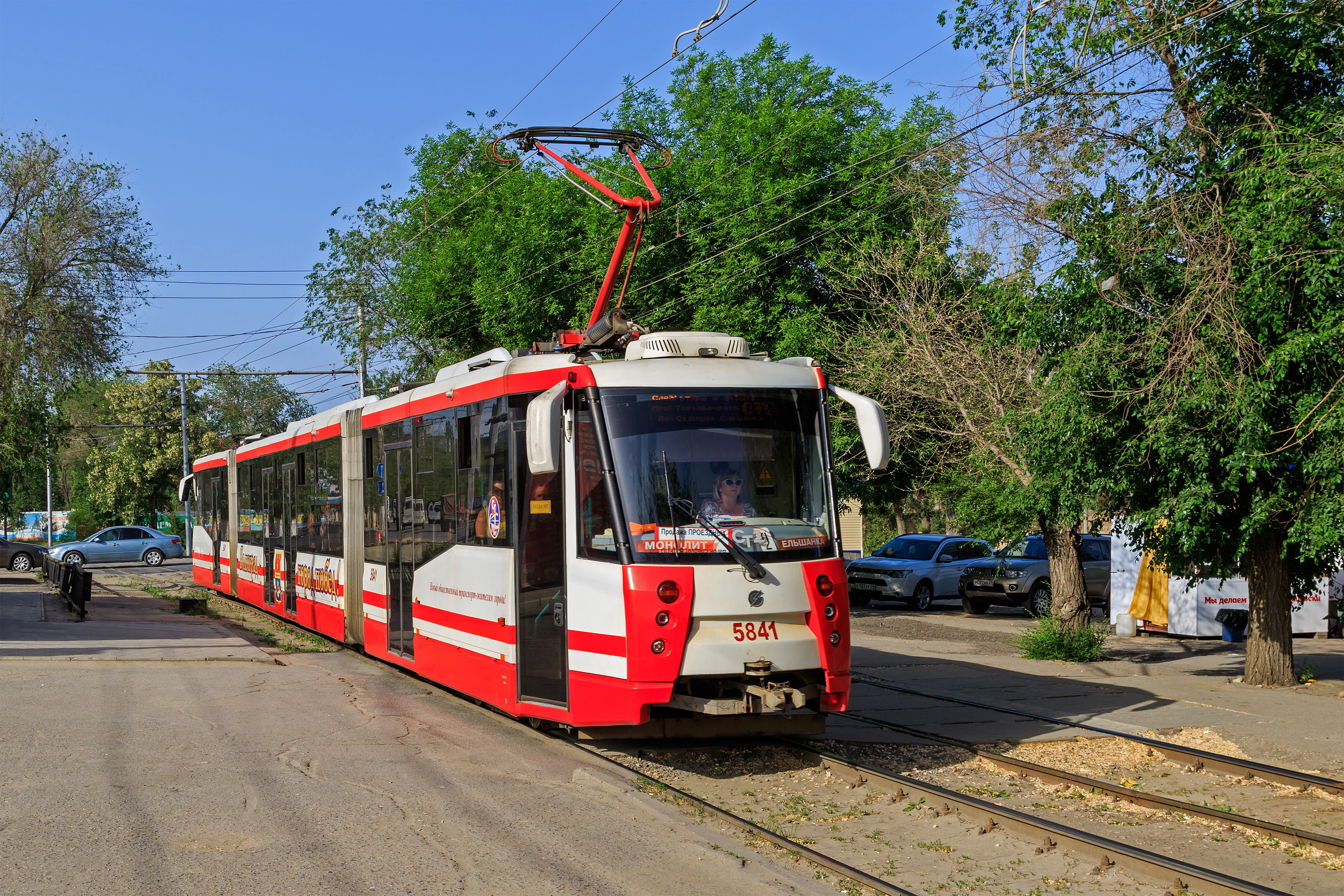

Overview
- Owner: Volgograd Municipality
- Locale: Volgograd, Russia
- Transit type: Light rail
- Number of lines: 2
- Number of stations: 22
- Daily ridership: 136,000

Operation
- Began operation: 5 November 1984
- Operator: ElektroTransport Plus

Technical
- System length: 17.3 km (10.7 mi)
- Track gauge: 1,524 mm (5 ft)

The Volgograd Metrotram (Skorostnoy Tramvay, ST) is a light rail surface/subway line operating in Volgograd, Russia. It was inaugurated on 5 November 1984, and had served 50 million passengers per year at the time the 2011 extension was opened.

The line consists of 22 stations along the Volga River on a route from the northern suburbs of Volgograd to the city center, with a total length of 17.3 kilometres (10.7 mi). Most of the line shares a surface-level right of way with existing tram lines; this section spans a total of 10.2 kilometres (6.3 mi). A subway section in the south has five underground stations and an elevated station; this section opened in two stages in 1984 and 2011, and spans 6.8 kilometres (4.2 mi).

There are two routes, ST and ST-2. Before July 2018, ST-2 terminated at 'Stadion Monolit' station, while ST terminated at 'VGTZ'. In November 2020, ST route was suspended to enable renovation of the tracks and power lines.

Line	Route	Opening	Stations
ST	Traktornyj Zavod (VGTZ) (Тракторный завод (ВГТЗ)) ↔ Ploshchad Chekistov (Площадь Чекистов)	1984	19
ST-2	Traktornyj Zavod (VGTZ) (Тракторный завод (ВГТЗ)) ↔ Yel’shanka (Ельшанка)	2011	21

Line map

The Volgograd metrotram normally use right-hand running, with left-hand traffic on the underground section between TRK Europa City Mall and Pionerskaya. This was done to enable unidirectional vehicles to use island platforms. On the new underground section between Pionerskaya and Yel'shanka, only bidirectional vehicles operate, with right-handed traffic and doors on both sides.

== Stations ==
List of stations north to south:

- Traktornyy Zavod (Tractor Factory)
- Khlebozavod (Bakery Works)
- Vodootstoy (Water-sediment)
- Bol’nitsa Il’icha (Ilich Hospital)
- Zavod "Barrikady" (Barrikady Factory)
- Chetyrnadcataya Gimnaziya (Gymnasium No.14)
- Stadion Monolit (Monolith Stadium)
- Zavod "Krasnyy Oktyabr'" (Red October Steel Factory)
- Tridtsat' Devyataya Gvardeyskaya (39th Guards Rifle Division Street)
- Ploshchad' Vozrozhdeniya (Revival Square)
- Dvorets Sporta (Sports Palace)
- Mamayev Kurgan (Mamayev Kurgan)
- Tsentral’nyy Stadion (Central Stadium)
- Tsentral’nyy Park Kul’tury i Otdykha (Central Rest and Culture Park)
- Yevropa (Europa City Mall)
- Ploshchad' Lenina (Lenin Square) - underground
- Komsomol’skaya (Komsomol street) - underground
- Pionerskaya (Pioneers) - elevated
  - Ploshchad' Chekistov (Chekists Square) - ST branch
- Profsoyuznaya (Labour Unions) - underground
- Teatr Yunogo Zritelya (Theatre for Young Spectators) - underground
- Yel’shanka - underground, ST-2 branch

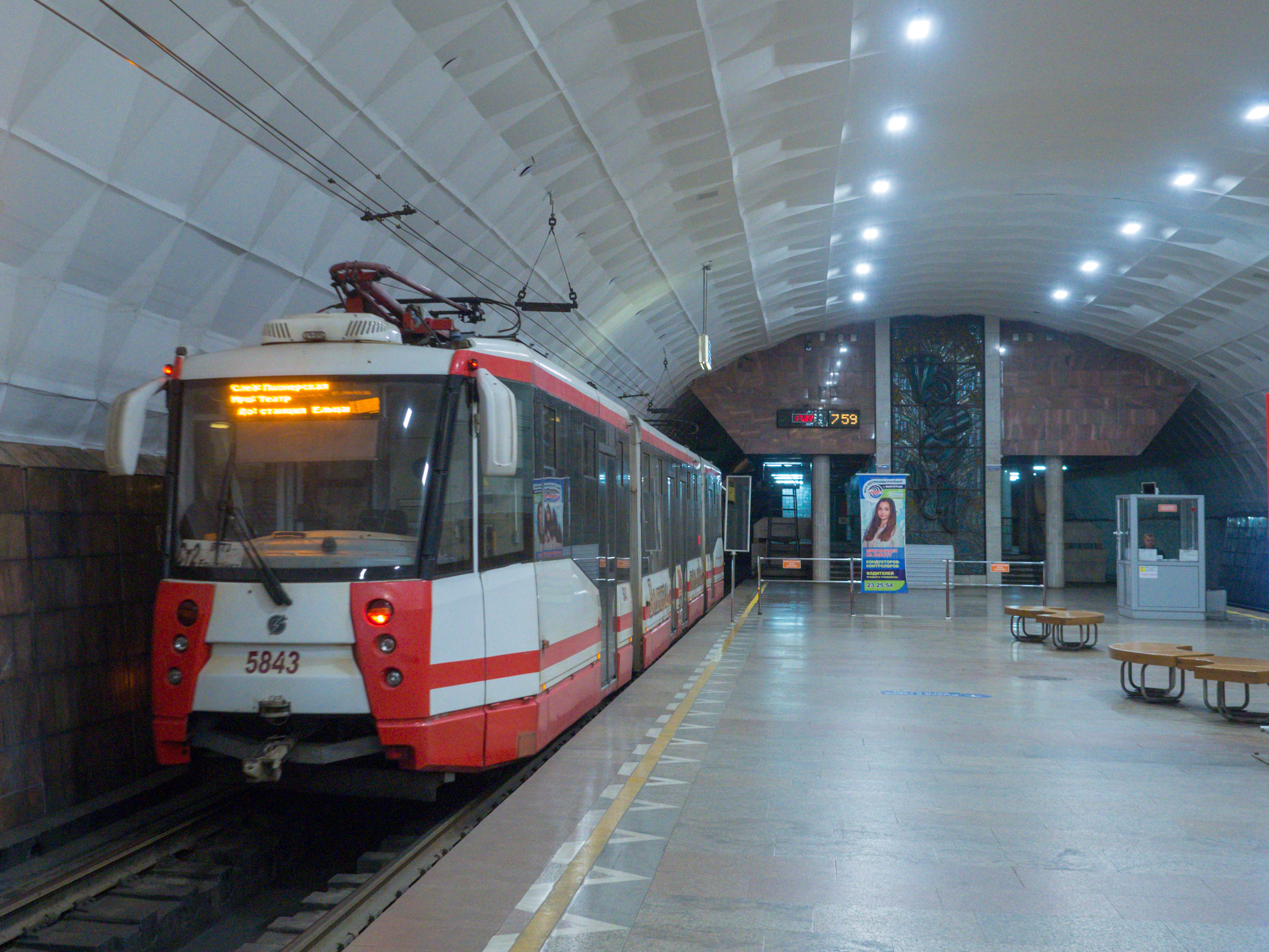
Ploshad Lenina station (2019)

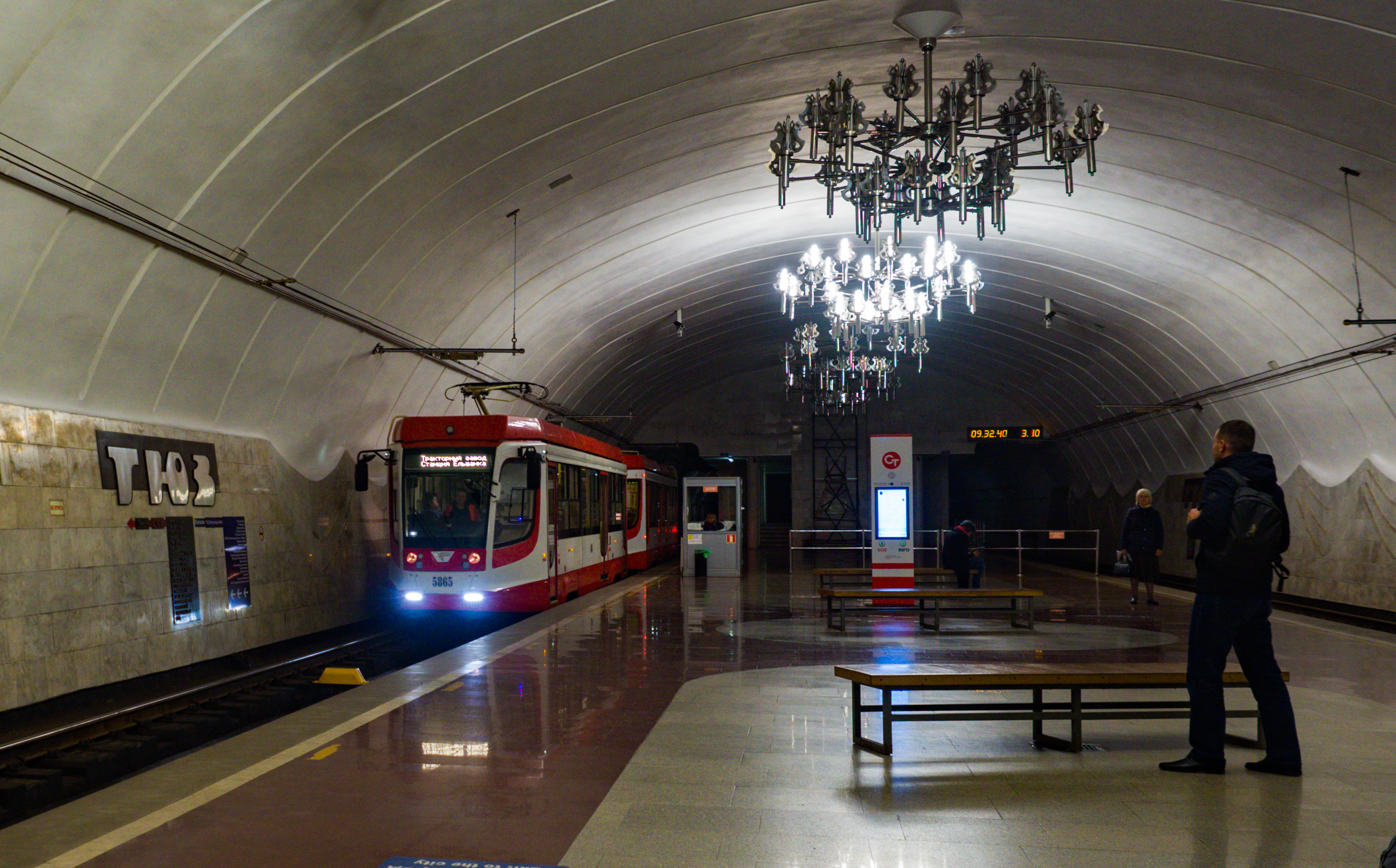
New station TUZ (2019) with a dimmed lighting

Planned stations:

- Novosibirskaya
- Agrarnyj Universitet (Agricultural University)
- Tormosilovskaya
- Panfilovskaya
- Kuporosnaya balka (Vitriol valley)
- Gosuniversitet (State University)
