= Pyatimorsk =

Pyatimorsk Пятиморск
- Settlement
- Location within Volgograd Oblast Location within Russia
- Coordinates: 48°38′N 43°36′E
- Country: Russia
- Region: Volgograd Oblast
- District: Kalachyovsky District
- Time zone: UTC+4:00

Pyatimorsk (Russian: Пятиморск) is a rural locality (a settlement) in Ilyevskoye Rural Settlement, Kalachyovsky District, Volgograd Oblast, Russia. The population was 2,657 as of 2010. There are 23 streets.

== Geography ==
Pyatimorsk is located in steppe, on the bank of the Volga–Don Canal, 10 km southeast of Kalach-na-Donu (the district's administrative centre) by road. Ilyevka is the nearest rural locality.
