= Gayev =

Gayev (Russian: Гаев; masculine) is a Russian surname formed from the Rome given name Gaius (with Greek origin) or from the Slavonic word gay (Russian: гай) meaning noise. Librarians often transliterate this name as Gaev. The feminine form of the surname is Gayeva or Gaeva (Russian: Гаева). In particular this surname is spread out in the Perm Krai (Ural Federal District).

The surname is shared by:

- Boris Gayev (1905–1974), Soviet scientist, one of the deputy directors of the Ioffe Institute
- Dmitry Gayev (1951–2012), Soviet railway engineer, long-term chief of the Moscow metro system
- Pavel Gayev (1901–1943), Soviet military intelligence officer, guards colonel, deputy commander of the 13th Guards Rifle Division
- Vladimir Gayev (born 1977), football player from Belarus, goalkeeper
