= Aleksey Zhadov =

Soviet army officer

Aleksey Semenovich Zhadov
- Алексе́й Семёнович Жа́дов
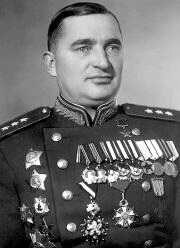
- Aleksey Zhadov
- Born: 30 March 1901; Orel Oblast, Russian Empire
- Died: 10 November 1977 (aged 76); Moscow, Soviet Union
- Relatives: Gleb Baklanov; Pavel Gayev; Alexander Rodimtsev
- Military career
- Allegiance: Soviet Union
- Service years: 1919–1969
- Rank: Army General
- Units: 21st Turkestan Mountain Cavalry Division; 4th Airborne Corps; 8th Cavalry Corps; 66th Army; 5th Guards Army; Central Group of Forces
- Conflicts: World War II; Battle of Białystok–Minsk; Battle of Moscow; Battle of Stalingrad; Battle of Kursk; Battle of Prokhorovka; Dnieper–Carpathian Offensive
- Awards: Hero of the Soviet Union

Aleksey Semenovich Zhadov (Russian: Алексе́й Семёнович Жа́дов), born with the surname "Zhidov" (Russian: Жи́дов, 30 March 1901 – 30 November 1977), was a Soviet military officer in the Red Army, who during World War II commanded the 66th Army, later renamed the 5th Guards Army, from the Battle of Stalingrad up till the end of the war. For his leadership of the army, Zhadov was awarded the title Hero of the Soviet Union. Postwar, Zhadov commanded the Central Group of Forces and was deputy commander of the Soviet Ground Forces.

== Early life and prewar military career ==
Aleksey Zhadov was born on 30 March 1901 in the village of Nikolskoye in what is now Sverdlovsk district of Orel Oblast. He joined the Red Army in 1919 and fought in the Russian Civil War. He graduated from the Frunze Military Academy in 1934, and in 1940 he took command of a cavalry division. In late May 1941, while serving as the commander of the 21st Turkestan Mountain Cavalry Division in the Central Asian Military District, he was promoted to command the 4th Airborne Corps stationed in Pukhovichi in the Western Special Military District, the military administration of the Belorussian Soviet Socialist Republic. Having primarily served in the Red Army's cavalry branch for 21 years, the promotion to command an airborne unit was a huge leap of responsibility for him.

== German Invasion of Soviet Union in 1941 ==
During the German invasion of the Soviet Union on 22 June 1941, Major General Aleksey Zhadov was en route on a train to Moscow from Tashkent in order to join the 4th Airborne Corps, which was now subordinated to the Soviet Western Front. When he arrived in Moscow on the morning of 24 June, he expected to hear news that the German attack had been promptly repulsed and the fight taken to German territory, but instead he was informed that the Soviet forces in the border areas were being battered and that communication among units and their lines of command had broken down. The next day on 25 June, he left on train for Minsk, the capital of Belorussian Soviet Socialist Republic. On the train, he met Colonel Nikolai Naumenko, who was en route to the headquarters of the Western Front's Air Force. After a German air raid while the train was in Orsha, further transportation on the railway was cancelled. He and Naumenko later at night, continued in a staff car to Borisov, driving slowly since using headlamps were prohibited. They often got slowed down by heavy traffic moving in the opposite direction and also had to constantly avoid German air raids.

On 27 June, the panzer groups of the German Army Group Center reached the outskirts of Minsk. Zhadov and Naumenko, instead of continuing to Minsk from Borisov, headed southeast to the headquarters of the Western Front located at a forest near Mogilev. On the morning of 28 June, he reported to the commander of the Western Front, General Dmitry Grigoryevich Pavlov, who simply briefed him: "The situation is complex, difficult, and most importantly is unclear." The forces of the Western Front were being mauled by German forces of Army Group Center in the Battle of Białystok–Minsk.

Minsk fell to the German panzer groups of Army Group Center on 28 June, resulting in the encirclement of most of the Western Front's units. On that same day, Pavlov issued orders for the 214th Airborne Brigade of the 4th Airborne Corps to launch an airborne assault in support of Major General Andrei Grigorevich Nikitin's 20th Mechanized Corps against the supply lines of Colonel General Heinz Guderian's 2nd Panzer Group, but there was little information on the condition of 4th Airborne Corps or exactly where it was. On 27 June, the corps had been ordered by the Western Front headquarters to withdraw to the region of the Berezina River beyond the German encirclement, therefore Zhadov had to drive down to the area in hopes of finding any personnel from the unit's headquarters. At first, he couldn't locate his unit, but after a few more trials, he made contact and joined the unit on the night of 29 June.

In Zhadov's absence, the corps' Chief of Staff Colonel Alexander Fedorovich Kazankin had been commanding the unit, and had started preparations to execute Pavlov's orders of 28 June. On 30 June, the 214th Airborne Brigade began their attack, but since its paratroopers lacked the aircraft necessary to launch the airborne assault they deployed on trucks. The brigade failed to link up with the 20th Mechanized Corps, and both forces were easily defeated by the 2nd Panzer Group. The remnants of the brigade fought on for 3 months in the German rear and in the frontlines alongside other Soviet units. Throughout the first week of July, the 7th and 8th Airborne Brigades of the 4th Airborne Corps dug-in and defended along the banks of Berezina River. But by 7 July, the German 3rd and 4th Panzer Divisions had reached the Dnieper River far to the rear of Zhadov's two airborne brigades, which both still held their positions along the Berezina River. Therefore, Zhadov's units withdrew towards the Dnieper River to avoid being completely cut off, and by 13 July have joined up with Soviet forces defending along the river. In late September, the remnants of the 214th Airborne Brigade were trapped in an encirclement during the Battle of Kiev, but on 24 September 200 survivors escaped the pocket and reached Soviet lines near Lebedyn. On 28 September the survivors reunited with their parent corps at Engel Air Base near Moscow.

=== Battle of Moscow ===
Starting on 2 August 1941, he served as the Chief of Staff of the 3rd Army, which was commanded by Lieutenant General Vasily Kuznetsov. He participated in the Battle of Moscow.

== Stalingrad Strategic Defensive ==
In May 1942 he took command of the 8th Cavalry Corps of the Bryansk Front. In October 1942 he took command of the 66th Army of the Don Front, which he commanded to the end of the war. His army took part in the Battle of Stalingrad, during which on 25 November 1942 he changed his surname from "Zhidov" to "Zhadov" on Joseph Stalin's request, because the name (Note: His original surname (Жи́дов) resembles the Russian pejorative name for a jew, Жидов ("Zhidov").) resembled the word "Zhyd", which is a derogatory term for Jewish people in Russian. Aleksey Zhadov was in reality ethnically Slav. Zhadov's 66th Army was renamed the 5th Guards Army for its bravery and tenacity displayed at Stalingrad.

== Battle of Kursk ==
In April 1943 the 5th Guards Army was subordinated to the Steppe Front, and later to the Voronezh Front on 8 July during the Battle of Kursk. The army took part in one of the largest tank battles in military history, the Battle of Prokhorovka during the Battle of Kursk. On the eve of the tank battle, his army had no tanks and was suffering from a severe shortage of artillery ammunition. Despite reporting that his army was in no shape to support the Soviet counterattack that resulted in the Battle of Prokhorovka, the failure of the counterattack was blamed on him. His army went on to perform successfully in Operation Polkovodets Rumyantsev in the later phase of the Battle of Kursk, and he was awarded the Order of the Red Banner for his army's performance in the Battle of Kursk.

== Soviet Offensives of 1944–1945 ==
He participated in the Dnieper–Carpathian, Lvov–Sandomierz, Vistula–Oder and Prague Offensives. He was awarded Hero of the Soviet Union on 6 April 1945.

On 25 April 1945, the 58th Guards Rifle Division of Zhadov's 5th Guards Army met the 69th Infantry Division of the United States First Army at the Elbe River, effectively cutting Germany in two. On 27 April in Torgau on the banks of the Elbe, the formal Handshake of Torgau was commemorated in front of cameras. On 30 April Zhadov hosted a boisterous victory party for the commanders and officers of the United States First Army and his 5th Guards Army, which included a banquet and carouse. During the party, he presented the First Army's commander, General Courtney Hodges, with the plaque of the 5th Guards Army received from the incumbent Soviet premier Joseph Stalin, and Hodges reciprocated by presenting the First Army's flag to him.

== Postwar ==
After World War II, he served as Deputy Commander-in-Chief of the Soviet Ground Forces from 1946 to 1949, and as the head of the M. V. Frunze Military Academy from 1950 to 1954. From 1954 to 1955, he served as the Commander-in-Chief of the Central Group of Forces, and from 1956 to 1964 served as First Deputy Commander-in-Chief of the Soviet Ground Forces. In September 1964 he became First Deputy Chief Inspector of the Ministry of Defense of the Soviet Union. He retired from active duty in 1969. He died on 10 November 1977 and was buried at Novodevichy Cemetery in Moscow. His war memoir, Четыре года войны ("Four years of war"), was published the following year in 1978.

== Awards and decorations ==
Soviet Union

Hero of the Soviet Union (6 April 1945)
Order of Lenin, thrice (4 June 1944, 21 February 1945, 6 April 1945)
Order of the October Revolution
Order of the Red Banner, five times (12 February 1943, 27 August 1943, 3 November 1944, 2 September 1950, 15 November 1950)
Order of Suvorov, 1st class, twice (22 February 1944, 29 May 1945)
Order of Kutuzov, 1st class (28 January 1943)
Order of the Red Star (15 June 1940)
Order for Service to the Homeland in the Armed Forces of the USSR, 3rd class (30 April 1975)
Medal "For the Defence of Stalingrad" (1942)
Medal "For the Defence of Moscow" (1944)
Medal "For the Liberation of Prague" (1945)
Medal "For the Capture of Berlin" (1945)
Medal "For the Victory over Germany in the Great Patriotic War 1941–1945" (1945)
Jubilee Medal "Twenty Years of Victory in the Great Patriotic War 1941-1945" (1965)
Jubilee Medal "Thirty Years of Victory in the Great Patriotic War 1941–1945" (1975)
Jubilee Medal "Forty Years of Victory in the Great Patriotic War 1941–1945" (1985)
Jubilee Medal "In Commemoration of the 100th Anniversary of the Birth of Vladimir Ilyich Lenin" (1969)
Medal "Veteran of the Armed Forces of the USSR" (1976)
Jubilee Medal "XX Years of the Workers' and Peasants' Red Army" (1938)
Jubilee Medal "30 Years of the Soviet Army and Navy" (1948)
Jubilee Medal "40 Years of the Armed Forces of the USSR" (1958)
Jubilee Medal "50 Years of the Armed Forces of the USSR" (1968)
Medal "In Commemoration of the 800th Anniversary of Moscow" (1947)

Foreign

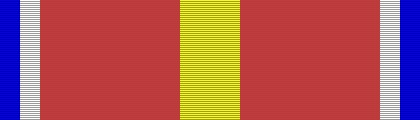
Medal of Sino-Soviet Friendship (China)
Military Order of the White Lion "For Victory", 1st class (Czechoslovakia)
Military Order of the White Lion "For Victory", 2nd class (Czechoslovakia)
War Cross 1939–1945 (Czechoslovakia)
Medal “For Strengthening Friendship in Arms”, Golden class (Czechoslovakia)
Medal "In Commemoration of the Battle of Dukla Pass" (Czechoslovakia)
Combat Order for Services to the People and the Fatherland, Gold (East Germany)
Commander's Cross of the Virtuti Militari, twice (Poland)
Officer's Cross of the Order of Polonia Restituta (Poland)
Cross of Valour (Poland)
Order of the Cross of Grunwald, 3rd class (Poland)
Medal "For Oder, Neisse and the Baltic" (Poland)
Medal "For Warsaw 1939-1945" (Poland)
Medal of Victory and Freedom 1945 (Poland)
Order of the Red Banner (Mongolia)
Medal "30 Years of the Victory in Khalkhin-Gol" (Mongolia)
Medal "50 Years of the Mongolian People's Revolution" (Mongolia)
Medal "50 Years of the Mongolian People's Army" (Mongolia)
Order of Tudor Vladimirescu, 1st class, twice (Romania)
Commander of the Legion of Merit (United States)
