= Pavel Gayev =

Soviet intelligence officer, Red Army colonel (1901–1943)

- Russian: Павел Витальевич Гаев
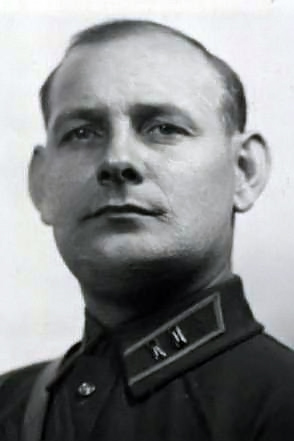
- Official photo of Red Army major Pavel Gayev (1936)
- Born: 17 August 1901; Nizhny Tagil, Russian Empire
- Died: 5 October 1943 (aged 42); Dnieper shore near Kremenchuk
- Relatives: Gleb Baklanov; Filipp Golikov; Matvei Zakharov; Aleksey Zhadov
- Military career
- Allegiance: Soviet Union
- Branch: Red Army
- Service years: 1918–1943
- Rank: guards colonel
- Unit: 13th Guards Rifle Division
- Commands: a number of rifle companies (1918-1931, politruk, commander); 6th Andijan Rifle Regiment (1935, chief of staff); Odessa Military District (1939-1941, chief of military intelligence); 9th Army (1941-1942, chief of military intelligence); 13th Guards Rifle Division (1943, deputy commander)
- Conflicts: Russian Civil War; Revolt of the Czechoslovak Legion; Liquidation of the Makhno Army; World War II; Eastern Front; Battle of Rostov; Barvenkovo–Lozovaya Offensive; Poltava-Kremenchuk Operation; Battle of the Dnieper †
- Awards: Weapon of Honour; Order of the Red Banner; Order of the Patriotic War, 1st class

Signature
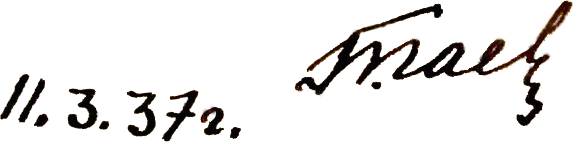

Pavel Vitalyevich Gayev (Russian: Павел Витальевич Гаев; 17 August 1901 – 5 October 1943) was a Soviet military intelligence officer, guards colonel, deputy commander of the 13th Guards Rifle Division (1943).

== Early years ==
Gayev was born on 17 August 1901 in Nizhny Tagil (Russian Empire) in a workers family. Initially, he only completed a two-year course of a zemstvo primary school in 1913. In 1918 he volunteered to serve in the Red Army were later he completed political courses of the Kharkov Military District (1921) and the Military Political School of the Kiev Military District (Kiev, 1923).

== Russian Civil War ==
Gayev started his military service as an enlisted Red Army man in the Malyshev Communist Battalion (June–August 1918). He participated in the Russian Civil War, took part in a number of battles (Revolt of the Czechoslovak Legion, liquidation of the Makhno Army, the armed forces of Admiral Alexander Kolchak and General Pyotr Wrangel).

He served as a politruk and commander of a number of rifle companies (1918-1931). From September 1921 to August 1922, Gayev was a military controller of the Special Department No. 5 in Proskurov. In 1928 he was selected to attend an officer training course known as Vystrel which he graduated from in 1929.

== Military intelligence service ==
In 1934 Gayev completed a course of the M. V. Frunze Military Academy and was assigned to serve as a staff officer of the 69th Kharkiv Rifle Regiment (May 1934 - February 1935, assistant to the chief of staff) and the 6th Andijan Rifle Regiment (1935, chief of staff). He was later assigned to the staff of the Kiev Military District (as an officer of the First Department) where he served in between the August 1935 and August 1936.

In August 1936 he was selected to serve in the Red Army Intelligence Directorate system and in 1937 he joined the office of the Red Army Military attaché in Warsaw, Poland. Gayev was fluent in Polish and German languages.

Upon completion of his mission in Poland, he served as the Red Army Intelligence Directorate officer (July–September 1939) and chief of military intelligence in the staff of the Odessa Military District (November 1939 - July 1941).

According to archival documents Gaev on request of the Chief of the Red Army Intelligence Filipp Golikov conducted during this period a verification of intelligence reports from the Bucharest resident on the preparation of German invasion in the USSR.

== German-Soviet War ==
In the war period, Gayev was involved in combat operations from the end of July 1941, initially as chief of military intelligence in the staff of the 9th Army (1941-1942). This time 9th Army participated in the battle of Rostov (1941) and in the Barvenkovo–Lozovaya operation.

In 1943 he graduated from a short course of the K. E. Voroshilov General Staff Military Academy and was assigned a deputy commander of the 13th Guards Rifle Division (5th Guards Army, Voronezh Front). In the division command he played a notable role in the liberation of Poltava and the battle of the Dnieper. Gayev was awarded the Order of the Red Banner for commanding the vanguard detachment in the successful crossing the Vorskla river which allowed the Soviets to regain control of the city of Poltava.

== Death ==
On 5 October 1943 Gayev was killed in action on the battlefield (at the left shore of the Dnieper river near Kremenchuk) when commanding one of the river crossing operations in the battle of the Dnieper. For this operation he was awarded the Order of the Patriotic War, 1st Class (posthumously) for the outstanding personal commanding role in crossing the river Dnieper by the 13th Guards Rifle Division troops in early October 1943.

Initially he was buried at the city cemetery of Poltava but later his tomb was moved to the newly established military memorial in Poltava's Ivan Kotliarevsky Park (1969).

== Family ==
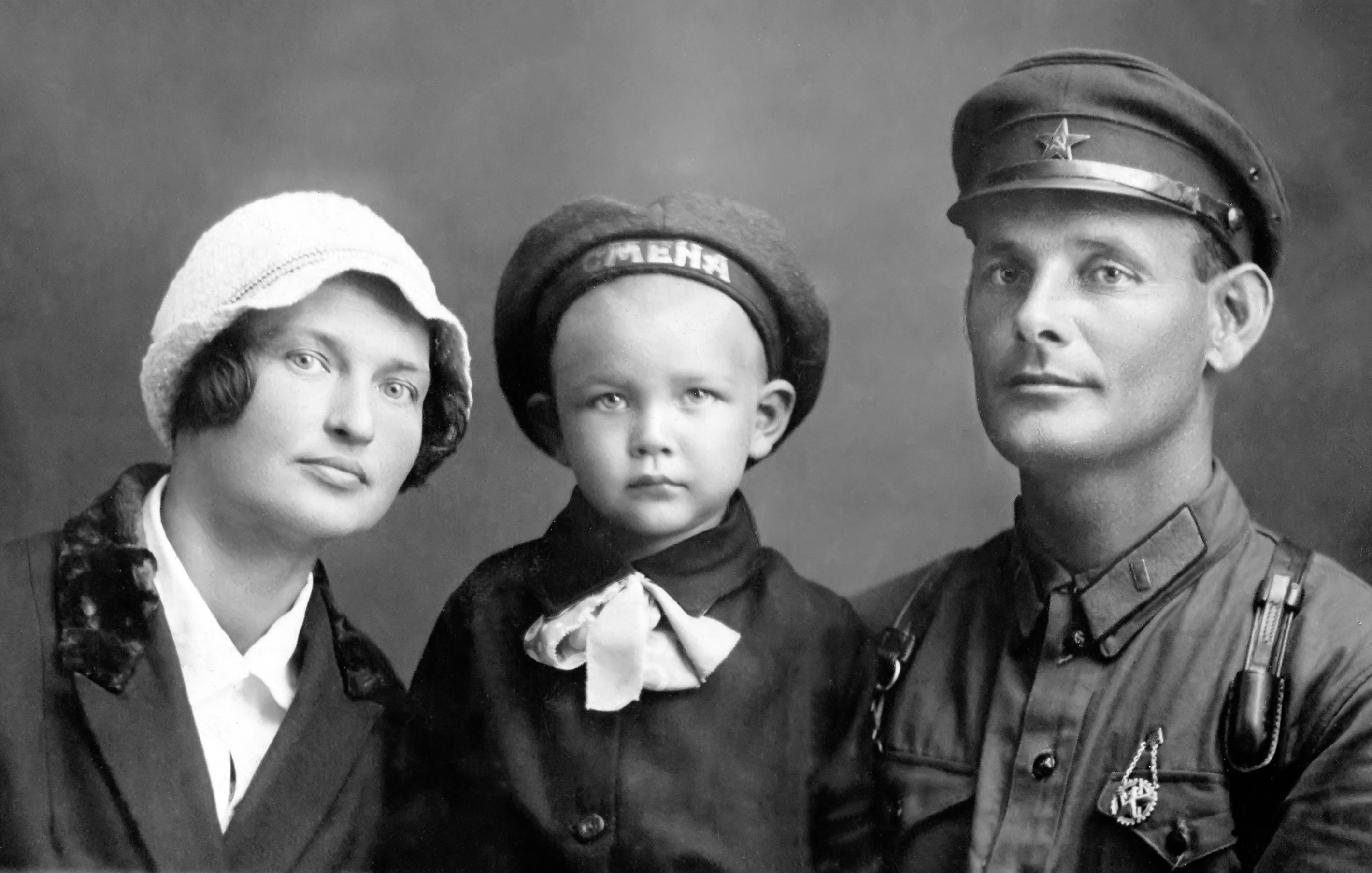
Gayev's family: wife Eugeniya, son Rem and senior politruk Pavel Gayev (photo taken in between the 1932 and 1935)

Pavel Gayev was the elder of three sons in his family. His father died when Pavel was eight and his mother moved to Yekaterinburg where she worked as a railway train conductor.

Middle brother Vasily V. Gayev (Russian: Василий Витальевич Гаев) (1904-?) also worked on the railroad in Nizhny Tagil. During the Great Purge Vasily was arrested and sent to the Gulag camps, later rehabilitated in 1962. The youngest brother in the family was Anatoly V. Gayev (Russian: Анатолий Витальевич Гаев) (1907-1954) who lived and died in Chelyabinsk.

Pavel Gayev got married in late 1920th and his wife was Eugeniya I. Gayeva (Russian: Евгения Ивановна Гаева) (born in 1901). During the war she lived in Chelyabinsk, after the 1945 — in Kiev. Their son — Remar P. Gayev (Russian: Ремар Павлович Гаев) (born in 1930) was an officer of the Soviet Armed Forces.

== Awards ==
- Browning Weapon of Honour (1928)
- Jubilee Medal "XX Years of the Workers' and Peasants' Red Army" (1938)
- Order of the Red Banner (1943)
- Order of the Patriotic War, 1st Class (1943, posthumously)

== Recognition ==
- Aleksey Zhadov, commander of the 5th Guards Army, noted in his memoir when writing about the battle of the Dnieper:

In the battles on these islands we suffered considerable losses. The deputy commander of the 13th Guards Rifle Division guards colonel P. V. Gayev was killed in action. I could not believe that this brave, strong-willed, enterprising officer is no longer with us.

- Gleb Baklanov, commander of the 13th Guards Rifle Division in 1943-1944, in his memoir attested Gayev as:

My irreplaceable deputy, my right hand, the fearless man the soldiers jokingly called enchanted against bullets.

- View from another level of command expressed in 13th Guards Rifle Division guards sergeant Lipa Gurvits' memoir:

Sappers began to prepare for crossing the Dnieper. All boats, barrels, wickers, logs of burnt houses, fallen trees were mobilized in the village. The observation post of the division commander was next to our 34th Regiment command and control post. On the shore, despite the strong shelling of the enemy, the deputy division commander colonel Gayev was watching the preparation of the boats blithely strolling along the coast. It was a very impressive figure: tall, large build, with his gray-hairs fluttering in the wind. He reminded me of King Lear. Colonel Gayev walked along the coast as enchanted against shells and mines that reached from the right bank of the Dnieper, he stimulated sappers with a stick, collected soldiers who were free from duties, hurried to prepare the ferry. But in war, no one was insured. Colonel Gayev was killed by a shell projectile near the division сommand and control post.
