= Aleksandr Rodimtsev =

Military officer and hero of the Soviet Union

Alexander Rodimtsev
- Born: 8 March 1905; Sharlyk, Orenburg Governorate, Russian Empire
- Died: 13 April 1977 (aged 72); Moscow, Soviet Union
- Relatives: Gleb Baklanov
- Military career
- Allegiance: Soviet Union
- Branch: Soviet Army
- Service years: 1927–1977
- Rank: Colonel general
- Units: 13th Guards Rifle Division; 32nd Guards Rifle Corps, which included the 13th Guards Rifle Division, the 66th Guards Rifle Division, and the 6th Guards Airborne Division
- Commands: Deputy Commander of the Eastern Siberian Military District and the Northern Military District
- Conflicts: Spanish Civil War; World War II; Eastern Front; Battle of Kharkov; Battle of Stalingrad; Battle of Kursk; Operation Bagration
- Awards: Hero of the Soviet Union (twice)

Alexander Ilich Rodimtsev (Russian: Александр Ильич Родимцев; 8 March 1905 – 13 April 1977) was a colonel general in the Red Army during World War II and who was awarded the title Hero of the Soviet Union in 1937 and 1945.

== Career ==
Rodimtsev joined the Red Army in 1927. He fought in the Spanish Civil War on the side of the Republicans against Francisco Franco in 1936-1937, where he earned his first decoration as a Hero of the Soviet Union. During the course of the Second World War, he is best remembered for his role in the Battle of Stalingrad, where he brilliantly commanded the 13th Guards Rifle Division which earned him his second order of Hero of the Soviet Union. The division was charged to hold the Germans between Mamayev Kurgan and Tsaritsa Gorge, which his outnumbered and outgunned force successfully did. Rodimtsev was vastly popular with his troops and was well known for his bravery.

In 1943, after the Battle of Stalingrad, Rodimtsev commanded the 32nd Guards Rifle Corps, which included the 13th Guards Rifle Division, the 66th Guards Rifle Division, and the 6th Guards Airborne Division. The 32nd Guards Rifle Corps was an element of the 5th Guards Army, which was a part of the Steppe Front (commanded by Marshal Ivan Konev), and engaged SS Panzer divisions at the Battle of Kursk.

After the war Rodimtsev served as the Deputy Commander of the Eastern Siberian Military District, then served as a military attaché in Albania, before serving again as a deputy commander for a Military District, this time for the Northern Military District.
