= 299th Division =

299th Division may refer to:

- 299th Infantry Division, Wehrmacht, Germany
- 299th Rifle Division, Soviet Union

== See also ==
- List of military divisions by number
