= Kazankin =

Kazankin (Russian: Казанкин) is a Russian masculine surname, its feminine counterpart is Kazankina. It may refer to

- Alexander Kazankin (1900–1955), Soviet military commander
- Tatyana Kazankina (born 1951), Russian middle-distance runner
