= Alexander Kazankin =

Soviet general (1900–1955)

Alexander Fyodorovich Kazankin
- Александр Фёдорович Казанкин
- Born: 15 April 1900; Buinsk, Tatarstan, Russian Empire
- Died: 20 March 1955 (aged 54); Moscow, Soviet Union
- Burial place: Novodevichy Cemetery
- Military career
- Allegiance: Soviet Union
- Branch: Red Army
- Service years: 1918–1955
- Rank: Lieutenant general
- Commands: 4th Airborne Corps; 1st Guards Airborne Division; 16th Guards Airborne Division; 12th Guards Rifle Corps; 39th Guards Rifle Corps; Soviet airborne
- Conflicts: Russian Civil War; Basmachi Rebellion; World War II; Winter War; Eastern Front; Battle of Smolensk; Battles of Rzhev; Battle of the Dnieper; Berlin Offensive
- Awards: Order of Lenin (2); Order of the Red Banner (5); Order of Kutuzov, 1st class; Order of Bogdan Khmelnitsky, 1st class; Order of Suvorov, 2nd class

Alexander Fyodorovich Kazankin (Russian: Александр Фёдорович Казанкин; 15 April 1900 – 20 March 1955) was a Red Army Lieutenant general who commanded the Soviet airborne. He fought in the Russian Civil War and graduated from the Frunze Military Academy in 1934. Kazankin led the 4th Airborne Corps during the Vyazma airborne operation. He later commanded the 1st Guards Airborne Division, 16th Guards Airborne Division, 12th Guards Rifle Corps and 39th Guards Rifle Corps. Kazankin became the Soviet airborne commander in October 1947, but was demoted to deputy commander in December 1948. After briefly becoming airborne forces commander again between January and March 1950, Kazankin successively became inspector general of the airborne forces and then deputy airborne forces inspector general before his death on 20 March 1955.

== Early life ==
Kazankin was born on 15 April 1900 in Buinsk, Tatarstan. His father was a tailor. He studied at an ecclesiastical parochial school, but his father died and Kazankin had to begin tailoring at 13. In June 1919, he joined the Red Army. Kazankin first served in the 3rd Volga Regiment. In February 1920, he studied at infantry courses. In January 1921, Kazankin was sent to the Turkestan Front and served with the 5th Rifle Regiment and 28th Rifle Regiment, fighting against the Basmachi movement.

== Interwar ==
Kazankin was sent to the Petrograd Command Courses in October 1923. In April 1924, he was the assistant commander of a platoon in the 78th Rifle Regiment. He entered the Omsk Infantry School in August 1925. In 1927, he graduated from the Omsk Infantry School. In September, Kazankin was appointed a platoon commander in the 18th Rifle Division's 53rd Rifle Regiment. In April 1930, he was transferred to become the chief of ammunition supply for the 23rd Separate Rifle Battalion. Between April 1931 and June 1934, Kazankin studied at the Frunze Military Academy.

After graduation, he became the assistant chief of the 5th department of the headquarters of the 16th Rifle Corps. In September 1935, he was the assistant to the chief of courses for junior lieutenants and in February 1936 became the assistant chief of the 1st department of corps headquarters. In September, Kazankin led the operations department of the 47th Special Purpose Aviation Brigade. In February 1939, he became the chief of staff of the 214th Airborne Brigade, with which he fought in the Winter War. From March to May 1940, Kazankin studied at the higher commanders refresher courses. In May 1941, he was transferred to Belarus and became the chief of staff of the 4th Airborne Corps with the rank of colonel.

== World War II ==
After the beginning of Operation Barbarossa, Kazankin continued as chief of staff and became corps commander on 28 June. The corps fought in battles on the Berezina River. On 10 August, he was awarded the Order of the Red Banner for his leadership during the battles on the Berezina. In late August, the corps was withdrawn for reformation to Saratov, where a new commander was found for the corps and Kazankin became chief of staff again.

Beginning in January 1942, the corps fought in the Vyazma Airborne Operation. Between 27 January and 2 February, three battalions of the corps' 8th Airborne Brigade, the 201st Airborne Brigade of the 5th Airborne Corps and the 250th Separate Rifle Regiment were paradropped in the German rear near the village of Ozrechnya. The rest of the 4th Airborne Corps, composed of the 9th Airborne Brigade and 214th Airborne Brigade was dropped from 18 to 24 February west of Yukhnov with its objective to cut the Warsaw road and link up with the 50th Army. During the airdrop on 23 February, 4th Airborne Corps commander Alexei Levashev was killed when his aircraft was shot down. Kazankin became the acting commander. Due to the dispersal of paratroops in landing, the operation did not achieve its objectives. On 13 May, he was promoted to major general. During the breakout on 25 June, he was wounded.

On 15 July, he was recommended for the title Hero of the Soviet Union but instead only received the Order of Lenin. In August, the 4th Airborne Corps became the 38th Guards Rifle Division. After recovering in the hospital, Kazankin took command of the corps' second formation in Ivanovo, where it conducted parachute training. On 8 December, the corps became the 1st Guards Airborne Division. In February 1943, the division became part of the 68th Army on the Northwestern Front. In March, the division broke through German lines on the Lovat River. In June, the division was transferred to the 34th Army, with which it fought around Staraya Russa in July and August. In September, the division was transferred to the Steppe Front's 37th Army, where it fought in the Battle of the Dnieper, advancing towards Krivoy Rog. He became the commander of the 16th Guards Airborne Division on 23 December 1943. In November 1944, he became the head of training for the Separate Airborne Army, which was dissolved in December. On 11 February 1945, Kazankin was transferred to command the 12th Guards Rifle Corps, part of the 3rd Shock Army. It fought in the East Pomeranian Offensive and Berlin Offensive. Kazankin was seriously wounded on 28 April while fighting in Berlin.

== Postwar ==
In June 1946, Kazankin became the commander of the 39th Guards Rifle Corps. Between October 1947 and December 1948, he commanded the Soviet airborne. In December 1948, he became the airborne forces deputy commander. He replaced Sergei Rudenko in command of the airborne troops from January to March 1950. In June 1950, Kazankin studied at the Military Academy of the General Staff, from which he graduated in June 1951. Afterwards, he became the inspector general of the airborne troops. He became the deputy inspector general in May 1953. On 20 March 1955, Kazankin died and was buried in Novodevichy Cemetery.

== Awards and honors ==
Order of Lenin, twice (30 January 1943, 21 February 1945)
Order of the Red Banner, five times (9 August 1941, 12 April 1942, 26 August 1943, 2 November 1944, 1949)
Order of Suvorov, 2nd class (19 January 1944)
Order of Kutuzov, 1st class (29 May 1945)
Order of Bogdan Khmelnitsky, 1st class (6 April 1945)
Medal "To a Partisan of the Patriotic War", 1st class (1944)
Medal "To a Partisan of the Patriotic War", 2nd class (1944)
Medal "For the Defence of Moscow" (1944)
Medal "For the Capture of Berlin" (1945)
Medal "For the Victory over Germany in the Great Patriotic War 1941–1945" (1945)
Jubilee Medal "XX Years of the Workers' and Peasants' Red Army" (1938)
Jubilee Medal "30 Years of the Soviet Army and Navy" (1948)
Medal "In Commemoration of the 800th Anniversary of Moscow" (1947)
