= 299th Rifle Division =

- Active: 1st formation: July–December 1941; 2nd formation: June 1942 – summer 1945
- Country: Soviet Union
- Branch: Red Army
- Type: Rifle division
- Engagements: World War II
- Battle honours: Kharkov (2nd formation)

Commanders
- Notable commanders: Gleb Baklanov

The 299th Rifle Division (Russian: 299-я стрелковая дивизия) was an infantry division of the Soviet Union's Red Army during World War II, formed twice.

The division was first formed in the summer of 1941 and was destroyed during the Battle of Moscow in the fall of that year. The division was reformed in June 1942 and fought in the Battle of Stalingrad, the Belgorod-Khar'kov Offensive Operation and the Belgrade Offensive, before being disbanded postwar in the summer of 1945.

== History ==
=== First Formation ===
The 299th Division began forming on 10 July 1941 at Belgorod, part of the Orel Military District. Its basic order of battle included the 956th, 958th, and the 960th Rifle Regiments, as well as the 843rd Artillery Regiment and 363rd Reconnaissance Company. In early August, the division moved west to the Bryansk Front, where it was assigned to the 50th Army by the end of August. The 299th was caught up in Operation Typhoon, the German attack on Moscow, at the end of September. Although it was not trapped in the Bryansk pocket, the division suffered heavy losses in the fighting in October and early November, and on 18 November only 800 men were left in the division. On 3 December, the 299th was officially disbanded, possibly to add replacements to one of the other divisions preparing for the Soviet counteroffensive at Moscow.

=== Second Formation ===
The 299th Rifle Division was reformed on 6 June 1942 from a rifle brigade at Kovrov, part of the Moscow Military District. Its basic order of battle was the same as the previous formation, and it was quickly assigned to the 10th Reserve Army in the Reserve of the Supreme High Command. In August the 299th was transferred to the 8th Reserve Army, which became the 66th Army. The division moved with the army to the Stalingrad Front. As part of the 66th Army, the 299th fought in Operation Uranus in November, the Soviet counteroffensive which encircled the German 6th Army in Stalingrad. The division then fought in Operation Ring during January and February 1943, which eliminated the pocket. While the army was in the Reserve of the Supreme High Command, the 299th transferred to the 53rd Army in the Steppe Military District (Steppe Front from July). In August the division fought in the Belgorod-Khar'kov Offensive Operation, during which it was in the second echelon of the 53rd Army attack which broke through to recapture Kharkov on 23 August. For its actions, the 299th was awarded the honorific "Kharkov."

In January 1944, the 299th became part of the 5th Guards Army. The division was transferred back and forth between the 53rd Army, the 5th Guards Army, and 2nd Ukrainian Front reserves until September. In September, during the advance into Yugoslavia, the division became part of the 57th Army's 75th Rifle Corps. The division fought in the Belgrade Offensive and then advanced into Hungary south of Lake Balaton and Budapest. At the end of the war, the division was part of the 64th Rifle Corps, still with the 57th Army. The division was disbanded in the summer of 1945, part of the Southern Group of Forces.
