= Gleb Baklanov =

Soviet Army colonel general (1910–1976)

Gleb Vladimirovich Baklanov
- Глеб Владимирович Бакланов
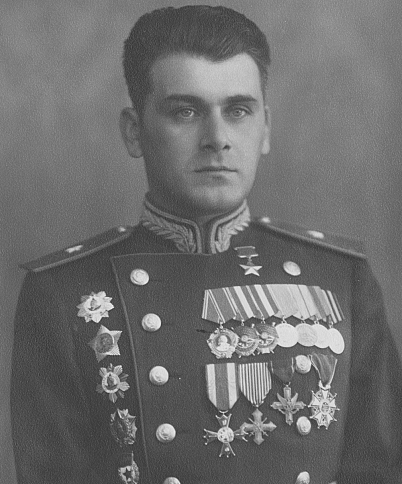
- Baklanov, c. 1945
- Born: 14 August [O.S. 1 August] 1910; Moscow, Russian Empire
- Died: 16 January 1976 (aged 65); Moscow, Soviet Union
- Burial place: Novodevichy Cemetery
- Military career
- Allegiance: Soviet Union
- Branch: Red Army
- Service years: 1932–1967
- Rank: Colonel general
- Commands: 299th Rifle Division; 13th Guards Rifle Division; 34th Guards Rifle Corps; 13th Army; Siberian Military District; Northern Group of Forces
- Conflicts: World War II; Winter War; Eastern Front
- Awards: Hero of the Soviet Union

Signature
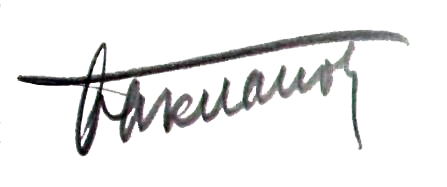

Gleb Vladimirovich Baklanov (Russian: Глеб Владимирович Бакланов; 14 August [O.S. 1 August] 1910 – 16 January 1976) was a Soviet Army colonel general and a Hero of the Soviet Union.

Born to a wealthy family, Baklanov was drafted into the Red Army and was selected for command positions during the interwar period. He served in staff positions and was wounded during the Winter War while a regimental chief of staff. After the German invasion of the Soviet Union in June 1941, he became a regimental commander but was wounded in fighting in Belarus and did not return to the front until early 1942 as a brigade commander. Baklanov commanded the 299th Rifle Division during the Battle of Stalingrad, being decorated for his actions, and went on to lead the 13th Guards Rifle Division at the Battle of Kursk among other actions. In mid-1944 he was promoted to command a rifle corps, a position in which he ended the war. For his leadership in the capture of Dresden in the final weeks of the war Baklanov was made a Hero of the Soviet Union. He held senior command positions after the end of the war, commanding the 13th Army, the Siberian Military District, and the Northern Group of Forces before his retirement during the Cold War.

== Early life ==
Baklanov was born on 14 August [O.S. 1 August] 1910 to a wealthy family in Moscow. His father Vladimir Baklanov owned a weaving factory and his mother Alexandra had been an actress before bearing children. His sister Olga Baclanova left the Russian SFSR in 1926 and did not return, having chosen to become a naturalized citizen of the United States. After completing secondary school he attended the V.I. Lenin Moscow Polytechnic College before being drafted into the Red Army in November 1932.

== Interwar period and Winter War ==
Baklanov was sent to the 1st Moscow Proletarian Rifle Division and graduated from a one-year command course in December 1933, going on to serve in its 3rd Rifle Regiment as a platoon commander, assistant company commander, battalion chief of staff, chief of chemical defense for the regiment, and assistant regimental chief of staff. He was transferred to the reserve in July 1938 during the Great Purge but returned to duty in May 1939 as chief of staff of the 541st Rifle Regiment of the 136th Rifle Division, serving in the Winter War against Finland in late 1939 and early 1940. Wounded in combat during the war, Baklanov received the Order of the Red Banner in recognition of his actions, his first decoration. After the end of the Winter War, he completed the first course at the Frunze Military Academy, before being appointed chief of staff of the 6th Motor Rifle Regiment of the 1st Moscow Motor Rifle Division in December 1940. Baklanov became a member of the Communist Party of the Soviet Union in the same year.

== German-Soviet War ==
Shortly after Operation Barbarossa, the German invasion of the Soviet Union began, the 1st Motor Rifle Division was rushed to the Western Front in late June 1941. Baklanov was soon promoted to command the 175th Motor Rifle Regiment of the division, but he was wounded near Orsha during the border battles. Upon recovery in November he was made commander of a battalion of students at the Omsk Infantry School. Returning to the front in January 1942, Baklanov took command of the 157th Rifle Brigade, part of the 11th Army of the Northwestern Front, distinguishing himself in fighting at Staraya Russa. Transferred south to command the 299th Rifle Division in June 1942, he led it in the Battle of Stalingrad as part of the 66th Army. 66th Army commander Rodion Malinovsky evaluated Baklanov as a "personally brave, strong-willed, and demanding commander...quickly acquiring experience in division command...a developing, capable commander." He was awarded the Order of Alexander Nevsky and the American Distinguished Service Cross for his actions at Stalingrad, and promoted to major general on 1 March 1943.

Baklanov was transferred to command the 13th Guards Rifle Division in May 1943, leading it in the Battle of Kursk and the Battle of the Dnieper as part of the 32nd Guards Rifle Corps of the 5th Guards Army of the Voronezh Front. During the northern hemisphere winter of 1943–1944 the division transferred to the 2nd Ukrainian Front with the army and fought in the Uman–Botoșani Offensive with the 32nd Rifle Corps; Baklanov received a second Order of the Red Banner for his leadership in the offensive. Corps commander Major General Dmitry Zherebin wrote that he was "bold and decisive in battle...in command of the division he showed exceptional leadership skill." After leading the division during the Lvov–Sandomierz Offensive in the northern hemisphere summer of 1944 following its transfer with the army to the 1st Ukrainian Front, he was promoted to command the 34th Guards Rifle Corps of the army in August.

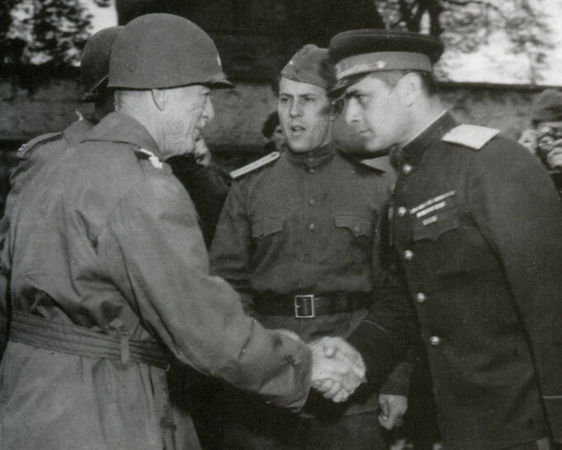
Baklanov greets First United States Army commander General Courtney Hodges

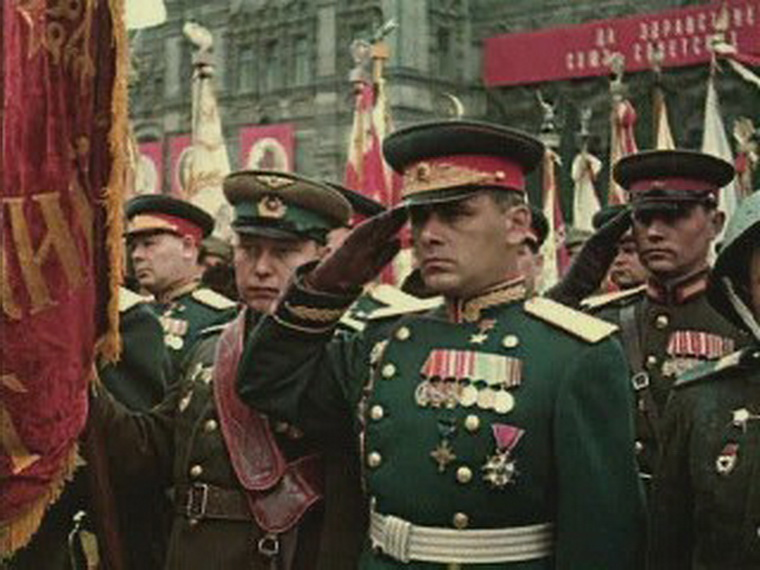
Baklanov saluting during the 1945 Moscow Victory Parade. To his left, carrying the banner of the 1st Ukrainian Front, is top air ace Alexander Pokryshkin.

Baklanov led the corps during the battles to hold the Sandomierz bridgehead for the rest of the year, in the breakout from the bridgehead during the Vistula–Oder Offensive in early 1945. During the preparation for the offensive, the pursuit of retreating German forces to the Oder, the crossing of the river and the expansion of a bridgehead, Baklanov "showed ability and perseverance in organization and leadership of the corps, consistently completing his assigned combat tasks", according to his army commander, Colonel General Aleksey Zhadov. In the subsequent Berlin Offensive, the corps crossed the Neisse, Spree, and the Elbe, making one of the first meetings with units of the First United States Army. It ended the war fighting the Prague Offensive during early May. For his "heroism and skilled leadership of troops in the battle for Dresden" Baklanov was awarded the title Hero of the Soviet Union on 29 May. During the Moscow Victory Parade of 1945 on 26 June, he commanded the combined regiment representing the 1st Ukrainian Front.

== Postwar ==
After the war, Baklanov continued to command the 34th Guards Rifle Corps when it relocated to the Kiev Military District, and transferred to command the 20th Guards Rifle Corps of the same district after the former was disbanded. He was promoted to lieutenant general on 5 July 1946.

After graduating from Higher Academic Courses at the Military Academy of the General Staff in 1948, he served as head of the Physical Training and Sports Department of the Ground Forces from June of that year. In this capacity, he led a Soviet delegation to the 1948 Summer Olympics in London to investigate the possibility of Soviet participation in the Olympics. Baklanov became commander of the 13th Army in the Carpathian Military District in 1954, first deputy commander and chief of staff of the Northern Group of Forces in Poland between 1959 and 1960, and commander of the Siberian Military District between May 1960 and September 1964. He was promoted to colonel general on 7 May 1960, and was commander of the Northern Group of Forces from November 1964 to April 1967 before his retirement in June 1967.

Baklanov first requested to retire in August 1966, but was denied; his second request in 1967 was accepted. Baklanov died on 16 January 1976 and is buried at the Novodevichy Cemetery.

== Personal life ==
Baklanov married Klavdiya Mareyeva and had a son, Andrei, and a daughter, Yelena.

He was a deputy of the Supreme Soviet of the Soviet Union during its sixth and seventh convocations, and a member of the Soviet Olympic Committee. A Moscow gymnastics champion in his youth, Baklanov served as president of the Gymnastics Federation of the Soviet Union between 1972 and 1975.

== Awards ==
Baklanov received the following awards and decorations:

- Hero of the Soviet Union
- Order of Lenin
- Order of the Red Banner (3)
- Order of Kutuzov, 1st class
- Order of Suvorov, 2nd class
- Order of Kutuzov, 2nd class
- Order of Alexander Nevsky
- Order of the Red Star
- Distinguished Service Cross (United States)
- Commander of the Legion of Merit
- Czechoslovak War Cross 1939–1945
