= 13th Guards Rifle Division =

Soviet Army formation

13th Guards Rifle Division 39th Guards Mechanised Division 13th Guards Tank Division
- 13-я гвардейская стрелковая Полтавская ордена Ленина дважды Краснознамённая орденов Суворова и Кутузова дивизия
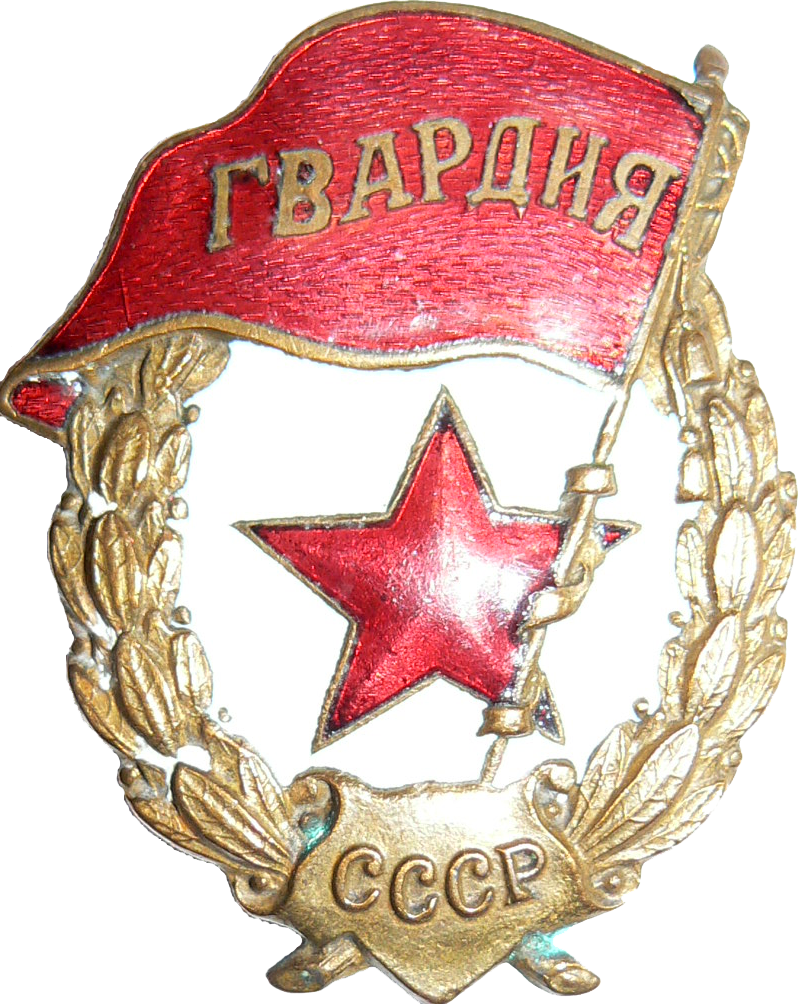
- Soviet Guards badge
- Active: 1942–1989
- Country: Soviet Union
- Allegiance: Soviet Army
- Branch: Army
- Type: Infantry
- Engagements: Battle of Kharkov; Battle of Stalingrad; Battle of Kursk; Battle of the Dnieper; Operation Bagration; Battle of Berlin
- Decorations: Order of Lenin; Order of the Red Banner (twice); Order of Suvorov; Order of Kutuzov
- Battle honours: Poltava

Commanders
- Notable commanders: Alexander Rodimtsev; Gleb Baklanov; Vladimir Komarov

The 13th Guards Poltava Order of Lenin Twice Red Banner Orders of Suvorov and Kutuzov Rifle Division (Russian: 13-я гвардейская стрелковая Полтавская ордена Ленина дважды Краснознамённая орденов Суворова и Кутузова дивизия) was an infantry division of the Red Army that was highly decorated during World War II.

Formed in January 1942 from the 87th Rifle Division (Second Formation) in January 1942, the division suffered heavy losses in the Second Battle of Kharkov and the subsequent Soviet retreat. Rebuilt, the division entered the Battle of Stalingrad in mid-September, in which it distinguished itself during several months of urban combat in the city center and at Mamayev Kurgan. After the end of the battle in early February, the division was withdrawn for rebuilding and in July 1943 joined the 5th Guards Army with which it spent the rest of the war. The division fought in the Battle of Kursk and the subsequent Soviet advance into Ukraine, capturing Dresden in the last days of the war.

After the end of the war, the division was reorganized as the 13th Guards Mechanised Division. It became part of the Soviet occupation forces in Austria during the Cold War and served there until the Soviet withdrawal from the country in 1955. The division was disbanded and merged into the 39th Mechanised Division, which was redesignated as the 39th Guards Mechanized Division to perpetuate the traditions of the 13th Guards. The division fought in the suppression of the Hungarian Revolution of 1956 and was stationed in Hungary for the rest of the Cold War. It was converted into the 21st Guards Tank Division in 1957 and returned to its wartime number as the 13th Guards Tank Division in 1965. As the Cold War drew to a close, the division was withdrawn to Crimea in 1989 and disbanded there under Soviet military reductions.

== World War II ==
In November 1941, 3rd Airborne Corps was converted into the 87th Rifle Division with Colonel Aleksandr Rodimtsev commanding; Rodimtsev had previously commanded the corps 5th Airborne Brigade. The division fought as part of the 40th Army during the winter of 1941-1942, and was re-designated as the 13th Guards Rifle Division in January 1942; Rodimtsev was promoted to major general four months later. In July, the division was mostly destroyed in the Donbas while fighting as part of Southwestern Front's 28th Army. The surviving command cadre was evacuated east of the Don in July and the unit was reformed in August. At the end of August, the division was subordinated to 10th Army in the Stavka reserve.

=== Battle of Stalingrad ===
==== Initial deployment ====
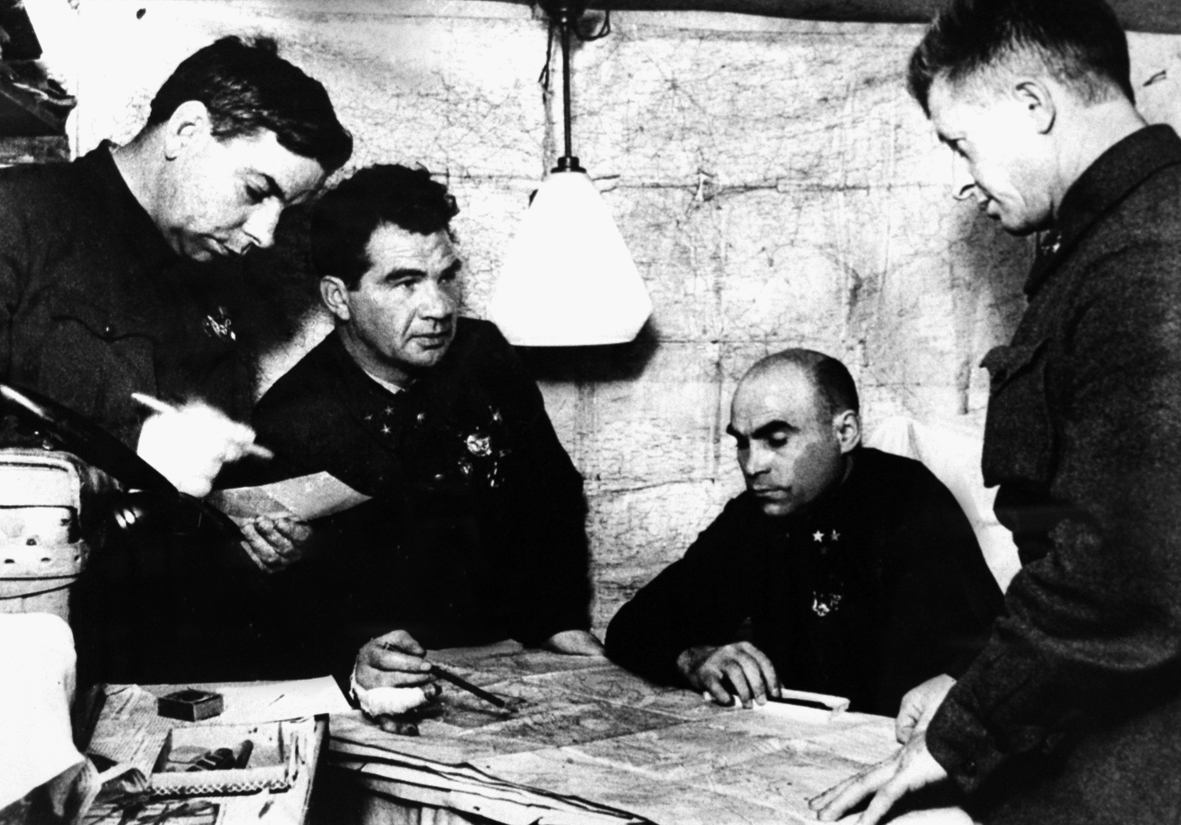
General Aleksandr Rodimtsev (right) meets with General Vasily Chuikov (second from left), commander of 62nd Army, in Stalingrad in December 1942.

The division was still reforming when it deployed to the Stalingrad region in late-September. By the time it entered combat after marching for two weeks, it included the 34th, 39th, and 42nd Guards Rifle Regiments, and a strength of 10,000 men. 1,000 men did not have rifles.

By 14 September, the German 71st Infantry Division was advancing into the city against the 62nd Army, threatening the central landing stage and, in places, reaching the Volga. The Southwestern Front began reinforcing the 62nd Army in the evening starting with the 13th Guards Division. Rodimtsev crossed during the day before his division to meet with General Vasily Chuikov, commander of 62nd Army.

The 6,000 men of the 39th and 42nd Guards Rifle Regiments were tasked with attacking into the city center and retaking the House of Specialists and Railroad Station No. 1. The 34th Guards Rifle Regiment was to reinforce Mamayev Kurgan. The division's training battalion and administrative company remained in reserve. The division crossed the river during the night, supported by its artillery firing from the east bank. At the same time, the unit sought sufficient rifles and ammunition. The 42nd Guards did not finish crossing until the 15th. The division's arrival stabilized the 62nd Army's situation. The division command post was set up in the NKVD building on the river bank.

According to a NKVD report from 16 September, the division suffered 400 casualties on 15 September and lacked ammunition, artillery support, and means to transport wounded by the end of the 16th. At the end of September, the division strength was reported as 5,866 or 6,075 men.

==== The Railroad Station ====
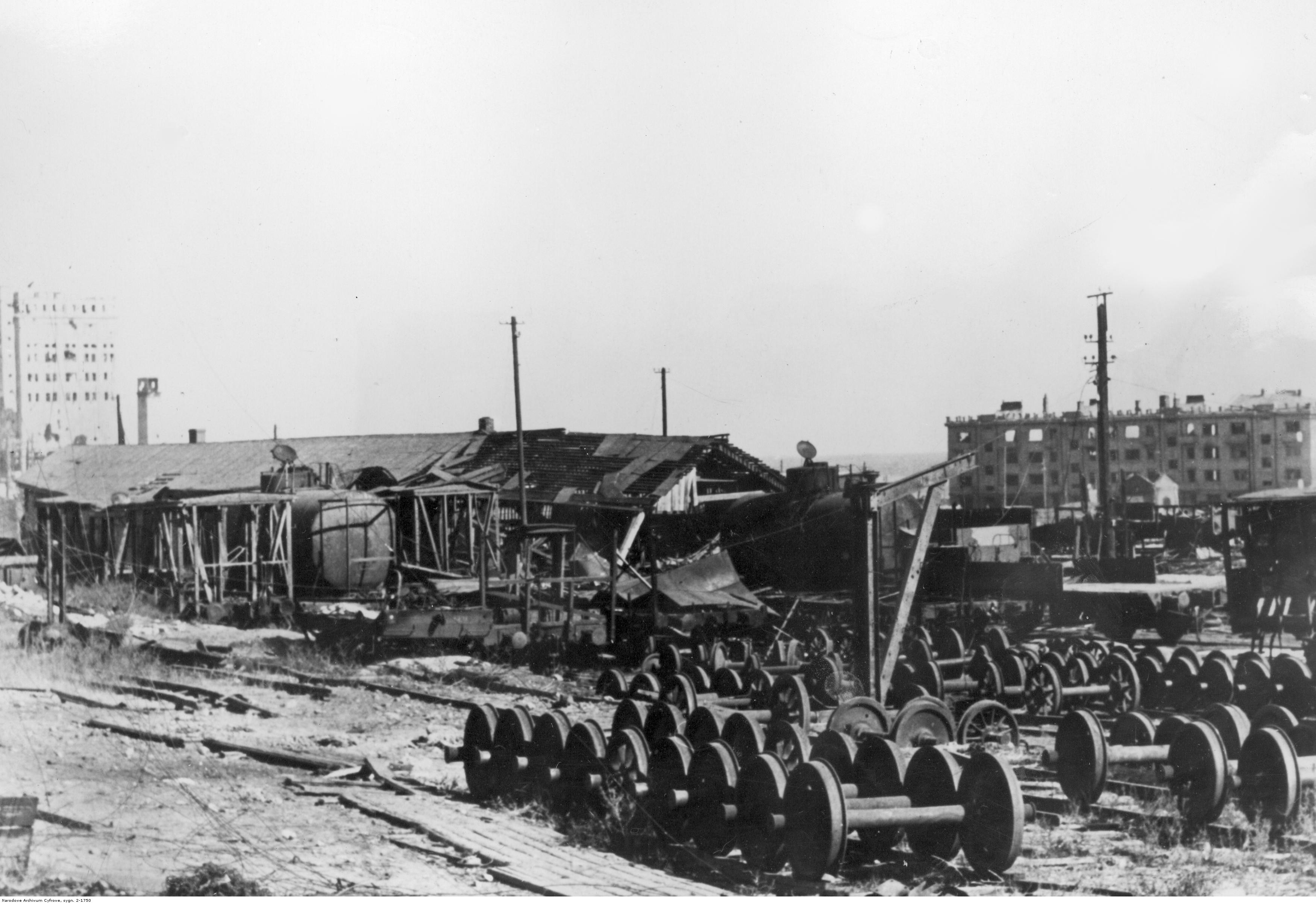
The ruins of the Stalingrad railway station in October 1942.

The following morning one of Rodimtsev's junior officers, Lieutenant Anton Kuzmich Dragan was personally ordered by Chuikov to hold a key railroad station in downtown Stalingrad against an impending German assault. Dragan proceeded to gather a platoon of less than fifty men and moved them over to the railroad station. Here, the small but determined force prepared itself for the German attack.

Soon after digging in, a substantial force of German infantrymen arrived to seize control of the station. The Russians proceeded to repeatedly frustrate the Germans in an epic room-by-room struggle for control of the depot for nearly three weeks. Breaking through walls, crawling over rafters, and burrowing under the floorboards, the Russians would yield but a portion of the structure to the Germans, only to emerge elsewhere and start the struggle all over again.

Exchanging gunfire down hallways, hurling grenades back and forth between rooms, Dragan's men inflicted significant casualties on the Germans. In spite of this heroic resistance, Dragan's platoon was eventually reduced to a handful of men. After running out of ammunition, and with their rations gone, one of the Soviet Guardsmen took out his bayonet and carved on a wall,

Rodimtsev's Guardsmen fought and died for their country here.

Under cover of darkness, Dragan and the five remaining soldiers under his command eventually slipped out of the building, made their way through the German lines, and were reunited with the remainder of the division.

==== Mamayev Kurgan ====
From 16 September, a prolonged "see-saw struggle" started for Mamaev Kurgan, a large hill with a commanding position over the city. 1st and 2nd Battalions of the 39th Guards Rifle Regiment, and two battalions of the 416th Regiment, engaged the German 295th Infantry Division's 518th Regiment. Neither side could gain complete control over the hill; the summit changed hands multiple times.

Meanwhile, other divisional units fought in different sectors of Stalingrad. The division was in the midst of the combat throughout the city in the remains of the bombed-out buildings and factories, on the slopes of the Mamaev Kurgan hills, in the Red October Tractor Plant and in the key strategic building known as "Pavlov's House" (Yakov Pavlov was the commanding NCO of the platoon which defended the building). Most accounts state that of the 10,000 men of the division that crossed the Volga into the Battle of Stalingrad, only between 280 and 320 of them survived the struggle.

=== Battle of Kursk ===
Following the Soviet victory at Stalingrad and the destruction of the German 6th Army, the 13th Guards were again pulled from the lines for re-fit and re-supply. Alongside the 5th Guards Army (Voronezh Front), the division was held in reserve south of Kursk, in order to counter the forthcoming German offensive there – Operation Citadel. The original intention was for these two formations to counter-attack the Germans after the German assault had been ground down by the front line Soviet units, but both formations were committed to prevent a possible breakthrough. After several days of continuous fierce fighting (including the tank battle at Prokhorovka, in which the division's small number of armored units participated in), they successfully ground the elite Waffen-SS formations to a standstill. Meanwhile, the rifle battalions of the 13th held the line around Oboyan, repelling attacks from their trenches. Relatively few casualties were sustained because the Germans were focusing their attention on Prokhorovka by the time they had moved up from the reserve area in the rear.

=== Liberation of Ukraine ===
Shortly thereafter, the 13th Guards Rifle Division advanced south-westwards, where they participated in the Red Army's assault to liberate Ukraine from German control. The division took part in the Poltava-Kremenchuk Operation in which they gained control of the town of Poltava after extremely fierce fighting, it was liberated on 23 September 1943. This is indicated by the designation of 13th Guards Rifle Division, Poltava (given in September 1943), which shows that the division was cited for their actions in seizing Poltava. After Poltava the division took part in the battle of the Dnieper. It was assigned to accomplish a false crossing of the Dnieper River to confuse the Germans and allow for crossings further north and south. Elements of the division crossed the river on floats and rafts to reach the island of Peschanny to the north-west of Kremenchuk where German infantry had occupied the west side of the island and had to be dislodged in hand-to-hand combat. The division forces sustained heavy losses in this operation when they were pinned down by enemy fire (even the deputy commander of the division Pavel Gayev was killed in action on the battlefield when commanding the operation).

After the Kremenchuk the division fought in the Kirovograd offensive, the Uman–Botoșani offensive, and the Lvov–Sandomierz offensive. For its capture of Novoukrainka and the key rail junction of Pomoshnaya during the Uman–Botoșani Offensive, the division was awarded the Order of Suvorov 2nd class on 29 March. It received a second Order of the Red Banner on 1 April 1944 for the capture of Pervomaysk. In July the division and the army fought in the Lvov–Sandomierz offensive as part of the 1st Ukrainian Front.

=== Advance into Germany ===
During the Red Army's final drive into Germany, the division was a part of the 32nd Guards Rifle Corps or was under direct command of the 5th Guards Army (2nd Ukrainian Front). This force drove the Germans back through northern Ukraine and central Poland in to the northern regions of Germany itself.

The division fought in the Vistula–Oder offensive, capturing Busko-Zdrój and Częstochowa, and crossing the German border on 19 January 1945. In February and early March 1945 the 13th Guards fought in the Upper Silesian offensive and the Lower Silesian offensive. During the Berlin Offensive, from 16 to 21 April, the division, as part of the army shock group, forced the Neisse and the Spree, advancing 60 km to cut the Dresden–Lübben autobahn northwest of Senftenberg. The 13th Guards reached Torgau on the Elbe on 23 April, its troops met with American units. For its "courage and valor" in the breakthrough of German defenses on the Neisse, the division was awarded the Order of Kutuzov 2nd class on 28 May. The division then turned southwards with the 5th Guards Army in the Prague offensive, in which it captured the strategic rail junction of Dresden on 8 May. During the war, over 20,000 soldiers of the division were decorated, and nineteen received the highest Soviet award, Hero of the Soviet Union.

== Later service ==
The division became part of the Central Group of Forces after the war and by 1 November 1945 had been converted into the 13th Guards Mechanised Division. The division was stationed in Vienna until 1955, when the group was disbanded following the Soviet withdrawal from Austria. The division was disbanded and its personnel and equipment became part of the 39th Mechanised Division of the 38th Army in the Carpathian Military District on 9 September 1955. On 4 December, the 39th Mechanised was redesignated as a Guards unit and inherited the lineage of the 13th Guards. In 1956, during Operation Whirlwind, the Soviet invasion of Hungary, the 38th Army covered the Austrian and Yugoslavian borders of Hungary on the right bank of the Danube. After the end of the invasion, the division became part of the Southern Group of Forces at Veszprém, where it remained for much of the Cold War. In December 1956, the 39th Guards became the 21st Guards Tank Division. In January 1965, the 21st Guards was renumbered as the 13th Guards Tank Division, restoring its World War II designation. According to American military sources corroborated by Vitaly Feskov and others, in September 1989, the division was transferred to Sovietske, Crimea in the Odessa Military District. It was disbanded there in December. The division's 130th Guards Tank Regiment, 56th Separate Reconnaissance Battalion, and 77th Separate Equipment Maintenance and Recovery Battalion became part of the 19th Guards Tank Division in Belarus.

The division's final honorifics in 1988 included 'Poltava', Order of Lenin, Twice Red Banner, Suvorov and Kutuzov.

== Subordinate units during World War II ==
- 42nd Guards Rifle Regiment
- 39th Guards Rifle Regiment
- 34th Guards Rifle Regiment
- 32nd Guards Artillery Regiment
- 4th Guards Anti-Tank Battalion
- 8th Guards Sapper Battalion
- 14th Reconnaissance Company
- 139th Signal Battalion
- 12th Chemical Warfare Company
- 11th Transportation Company
- 17th Field Bakery
- 15th Medical Battalion
- 2nd Veterinary Hospital

== Bibliography ==
- Feskov, V.I.; Golikov, V.I.; Kalashnikov, K.A.; Slugin, S.A. (2013). Вооруженные силы СССР после Второй Мировой войны: от Красной Армии к Советской [The Armed Forces of the USSR after World War II: From the Red Army to the Soviet: Part 1 Land Forces] (in Russian). Tomsk: Scientific and Technical Literature Publishing. ISBN 9785895035306.
- Glantz, David M.; House, Jonathan M. (2009). Armageddon in Stalingrad: September-November 1942. Stalingrad Trilogy. University Press of Kansas. ISBN 978-0-7006-3440-8.
- Ivanov, Sergei, ed. (2002). "Полтавская стрелковая дивизия" [Poltava Rifle Division]. Военная энциклопедия в 8 томах [Military Encyclopedia in 8 volumes] (in Russian). Vol. 6. Moscow: Voenizdat. pp. 498–499. ISBN 5-203-01873-1.
