= Vyazma airborne operation =

1942 parachute landing

Vyazma Airborne Operation
- Part of Battles of Rzhev
Date	18 January – 28 February 1942
Location	Smolensk Oblast, RSFSR
Result	German victory

Belligerents
Germany	Soviet Union

Commanders and leaders
(Nazi Germany) Fedor von Bock	(Soviet Union) Ivan Zatevakhin

Units involved
4th Panzer Army	4th Airborne Corps; other airborne forces units; 7,373 parachutists; 1,524 bales with ammunition and equipment

The Vyazma Airborne Operation was a Red Army airborne landing in the rear of German lines during the Battles of Rzhev. It took place from 18 January to 28 February 1942. The objective of the airborne landing was to help troops of the Kalinin Front and Western Front to encircle and destroy Army Group Centre. The airborne operation was unsuccessful and resulted in the loss of most of the troops landed.

== Battle ==
The Rzhev-Vyazma Offensive began on 8 January 1942 with the aim of encircling Army Group Centre. In the first stages of the operation, the Red Army achieved some successes. As a result of the attacks of the Kalinin and Western Fronts, the German lines were breached in several places. In order to facilitate the advance of the troops, Stavka decided to land troops south of Vyazma with the objective of cutting the Vyazma-Yukhnov highway and the Vyazma-Bryansk railroad. The planned drop zone was guarded by scattered German units. The first group of airborne troops, composed of the 201st Airborne Brigade and the 250th Airborne Regiment, was landed in the rear of German troops south of Vyazma from 18 to 22 January. The landing was made at night, and the paratroopers' presence in the German rear helped the attacks of the 33rd Army and 1st Guards Cavalry Corps.

At the end of January, the 1st Guards Cavalry Corps, under the command of Pavel Alexeyevich Belov, broke through the German lines. To prevent a German retreat from the planned encirclement, Stavka decided to land troops in the Vyazma area to cut the Vyazma-Smolensk railroads and highways. On 27 January, the dropping of 4th Airborne Corps in the village of Ozerechnya. Due to a shortage of transport planes, the paratroop drops were made in an alternating order, starting with 8th Airborne Brigade. German aircraft attacked the transport planes in the air and on the ground. As a result of German bombing raids on airfields, seven Tupolev TB-3 transport aircraft were destroyed. There was also very little fighter cover for the transports and many were shot down. As a result of this, as well as worsening weather conditions, Stavka was forced to suspend drops. However, three battalions of the 8th Airborne Brigade, comprising 2,100 airborne troops had been landed by 1 February, along with 34.4 tons of supplies. The landing itself was unsuccessful, as a large part of the supplies were lost, and the airborne troops were scattered over a wide area in winter weather conditions. As a result, only 1,320 paratroopers were able to reform into coherent units. The airborne troops attempted to cut German communications west of Vyazma. In a few days, they knocked out some parts of the railroad and highway and captured the headquarters of some German units. On 31 January, German Chief of the Army General Staff Franz Halder wrote that "The position of the troops of the 4th Army is very serious. There have been difficulties with supply." By 6 February, the survivors of the 8th Airborne Brigade had linked up with 1st Guards Cavalry Corps. Its units were included in the corps structure after the linkup.

By mid-February in the area of Vyazma an extremely difficult situation had developed. The Soviet forces failed to encircle the German troops and the fighting dragged on. Stavka decided to drop the main forces of the 4th Airborne Corps west of Yukhnov with the task of cutting the Warsaw highway and linking up with parts of the 50th Army. The landing of the 9th and 214th Airborne Brigades took place at night from 16 to 24 February. During this period, 1525 paratroopers and 7373 supply bales were dropped in the area of Zelanje. The landing took place with the active opposition of the Germans. On 23 February, the 4th Airborne Corps commander Major General Alexei Levashev was killed, when his transport was shot down. Corps chief of staff Colonel Alexander Kazankin assumed command. On the ground, the airborne troops faced strong German resistance. However, the airborne troops were able to link up with the 50th Army on 28 February, but the ground troops were unable to break through the German lines, and the offensive stalled.

== Aftermath ==
Left in the German rear, 4th Airborne Corps, in conjunction with the 1st Guards Cavalry Corps and elements of 33rd Army conducted active military operations. Elements of the airborne troops were destroyed during Operation Hannover. In early April, the combined forces were placed under command of Major General Pavel Alexeyevich Belov. The united forces seized the area south of Vyazma and held it until the end of May, pinning down a few German divisions. On the night of 26 May, the group broke through the encirclement and joined the 10th Army to the north of Kirov on 24 June.

== See also ==
- Soviet Airborne Troops
