= Yevgeny Zhuravlev =

Soviet lieutenant-general (1896-1983)

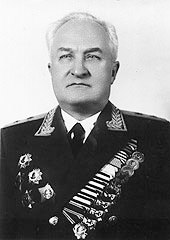
Yevgeny Zhuravlev

Yevgeny Petrovich Zhuravlev (Russian: Евгений Петрович Журавлев), (October 8, 1896 - May 11, 1983) was a Soviet lieutenant-general in World War II.

== Biography ==
Zhuravlev was born in the village of Roudkovka in the Chernigov Governorate in the Russian Empire, now in Ukraine.

In 1915, he was drafted into the Imperial Russian Army and fought in World War I on the Southwestern Front. He joined the Red Army during the February Revolution in Petrograd in 1918. He commanded a detachment of partisans in a revolutionary committee. From August 1919 to August 1924, he commanded a cavalry brigade in the Cossack corps. In 1925 and 1929 he studied at the Frunze Military Academy. In 1936, he was appointed Chief of Staff of the 5th Cavalry Corps. In October 1937, he became a teacher in the department of advanced cavalry training tactics for commanders. In 1940, he participated in the last weeks of the Winter War against Finland.

He was promoted to Major General on June 4, 1940. During World War II, he commanded the 5th Mechanised Corps in August 1941, which he led out of the Smolensk Pocket. In November 1941, he was appointed Chief of Staff of the Kalinin Front. From September 1942 to January 1943, he commanded the 29th Army and from January 1943 to March 1943, the 53rd Army. He was promoted to lieutenant general on September 9, 1943. From March 1943 to October 1943, he commanded the 68th Army and from October 1943 to February 1944, the 21st Army. From February 1944 to November 1944, he commanded the 18th Army and took part in the Dnieper-Carpathian Offensive, after which he was put into the reserve.

After the war, he was appointed to the post of deputy commander of the 27th army and, in November 1945, deputy commander of the Carpathian Military District. In March 1955, he was appointed to the post of Chief of the Land Force Personnel Department, until December 1960, when he retired.

== Sources ==
- generals.dk
- Коллектив авторов. Великая Отечественная. Командармы. Военный биографический словарь / Под общей ред. М. Г. Вожакина. — М.; Жуковский: Кучково поле, 2005. — С. 76—77. — ISBN 5-86090-113-5.
- encyclopedia.mil.ru
