= Yakov Pavlov =

Soviet Red Army soldier

Yakov Fedotovich Pavlov
- Яков Федотович Павлов
- Pavlov in 1947
- Born: 17 October 1917; Krestovaya, Russian Republic
- Died: 28 September 1981 (aged 63); Novgorod, Russian SFSR, Soviet Union
- Military career
- Allegiance: Soviet Union
- Service years: 1938–1946
- Rank: Starshina
- Unit: 13th Guards Rifle Division
- Conflicts: World War II; Battle of Stalingrad
- Awards: Hero of the Soviet Union; Order of Lenin; Order of the October Revolution; Orders of the Red Star; Numerous other medals
- Other work: Three-time Deputy of the Supreme Soviet of the Russian SFSR

Yakov Fedotovich Pavlov (Russian: Я́ков Федо́тович Па́влов; 17 October 1917 – 28 September 1981) was a Soviet Red Army soldier who became a Hero of the Soviet Union for his role in defending the eponymous "Pavlov's House" during the Battle of Stalingrad.

== Early life ==
Pavlov was born in 1917 to a peasant family in the small village of Krestovaya in northwestern Russia (present-day Novgorod Oblast).

== Military career ==
Pavlov joined the Red Army in 1938. During World War II, he fought on the Southwestern, Stalingrad, 3rd Ukrainian and 2nd Belorussian fronts. Pavlov was a commander of a machine-gun unit, an artilleryman, and a commander of a reconnaissance unit with the rank of senior sergeant.

During the Battle of Stalingrad, on the night of 27 September 1942, Pavlov's platoon recaptured a four-story residential building from the German Army, and defended it against continual attack by the Germans until relieved by advancing Soviet forces two months later. Vasily Chuikov, commanding general of the Soviet forces in Stalingrad, claimed that the Germans lost more men trying to take Pavlov's House than they did taking Paris.

== Post-war life ==
The building and its defense went down in history as "Pavlov's House" (Дом Павлова). For his actions in Stalingrad, he was awarded the Hero of the Soviet Union, the Order of Lenin, the Order of the October Revolution, two Orders of the Red Star and numerous other medals. Post-war, he joined the Communist Party. He was elected three times as Deputy to the Supreme Soviet of the Russian Soviet Federative Socialist Republic.

== Death ==
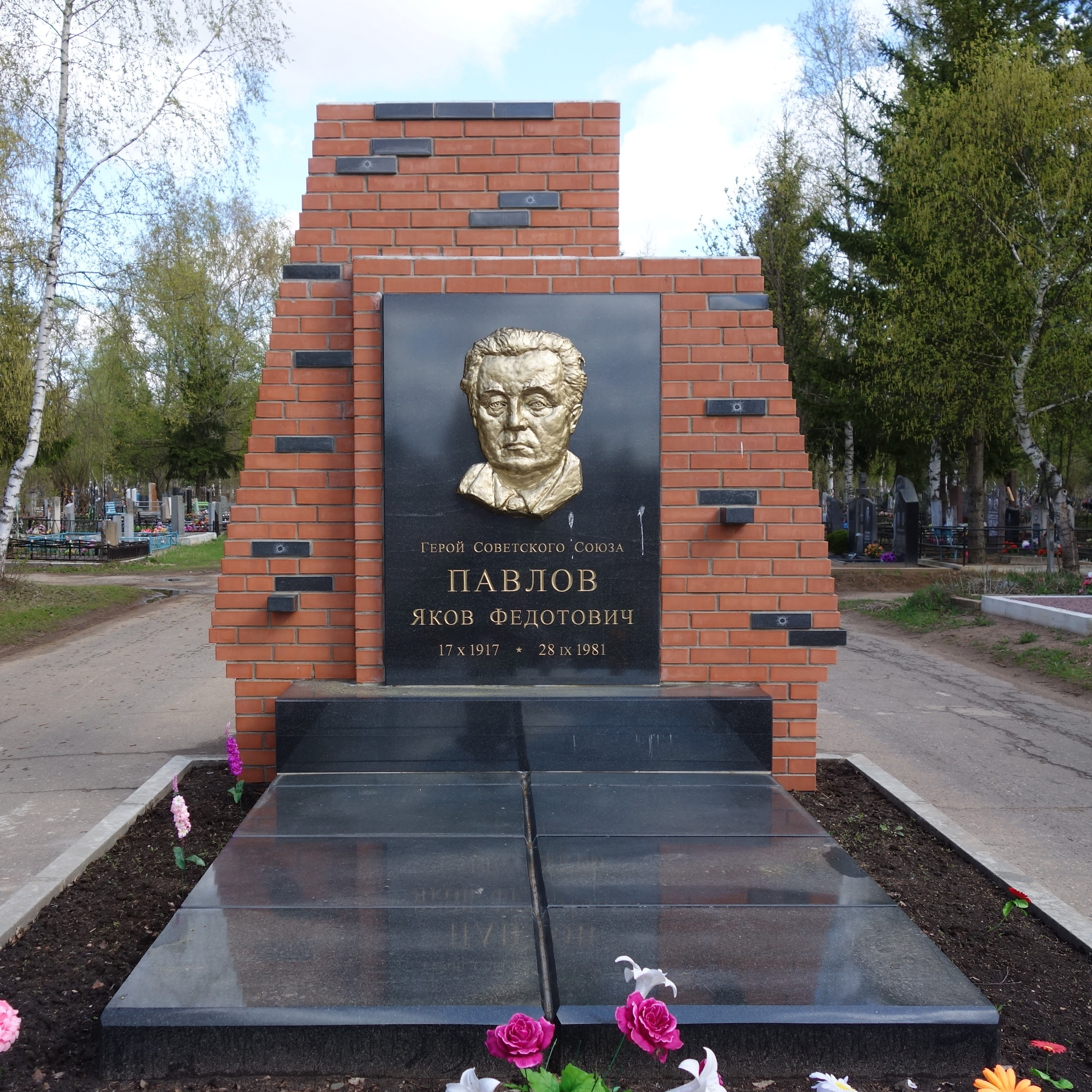
Pavlov's grave in Veliky Novgorod

Pavlov died on 28 September 1981, most likely due to injuries he received during his military career, and was buried in Novgorod.
