= Pavlov's House =

Battle of Stalingrad strategic location

Coordinates: 48°42′57.6″N 44°31′53.4″E

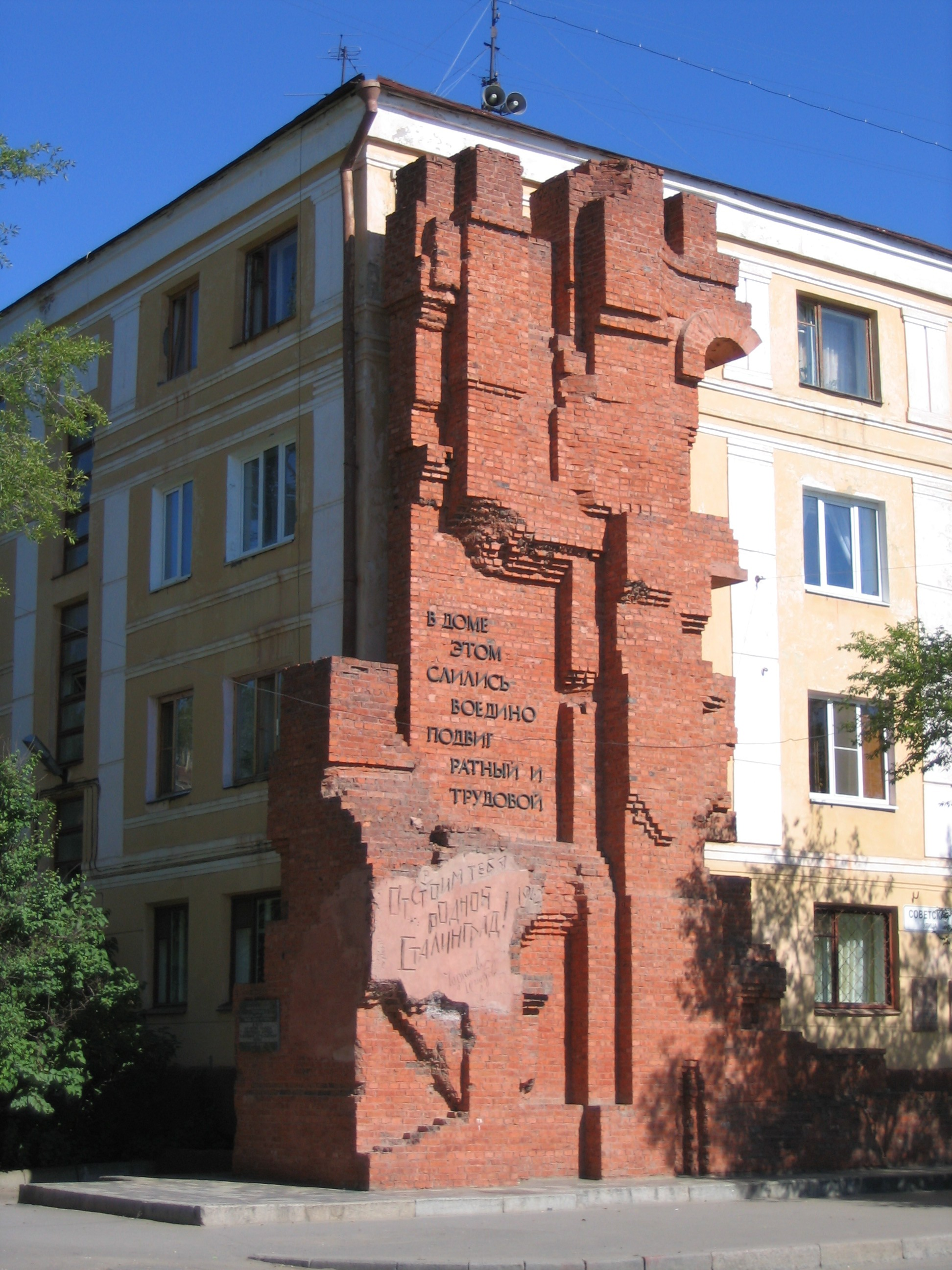
Pavlov's House in 2006

Pavlov's House (Russian: дом Павлова tr. Dom Pavlova) was an apartment building converted into a fortified position, which Red Army defenders held for around 60 days against the Wehrmacht offensive during the Battle of Stalingrad. The siege lasted from 27 September to 25 November 1942 and eventually the Red Army managed to relieve it from the siege.

It gained its popular name from Sergeant Yakov Pavlov, who commanded the platoon that seized the building and defended it during the long battle.

== Siege ==
The house was a four-story building in the center of Stalingrad, built perpendicular to the embankment of the river Volga and overseeing the "9th January Square", a large square named for Bloody Sunday. In late September 1942, between 30 and 50 soldiers of the 42nd Guards Regiment, 13th Guards Rifle Division secured the large apartment blocks from German control, following its recapture by four soldiers four days beforehand, which Yakov Pavlov led.

The position was quickly fortified under the command of Lieutenant Ivan F. Afanasiev, who ordered the men to lay landmines in all approaches to the square, barbed wire around the perimeter of the apartment block, and to position multiple machine guns in the windows as well as a PTRS anti-tank rifle. The Soviets also had large amounts of artillery support from the opposite side of the Volga. Supply and communication trenches were created leading from the rear of Pavlov's House to the river bank of the Volga, which received supply from supply vessels which were often shelled by German artillery when crossing the river.

The strategic benefit of the house was that it defended a key section of the Volga bank. The tactical benefit of the house was its position on a cross-street, giving the defenders a 1 km (0.6 mi) line of sight to the north, south and west. After several days, reinforcements and resupply arrived for Pavlov's men, bringing the unit up to a 25-man understrength platoon and equipping the defenders with machine guns, anti-tank rifles, and mortars.

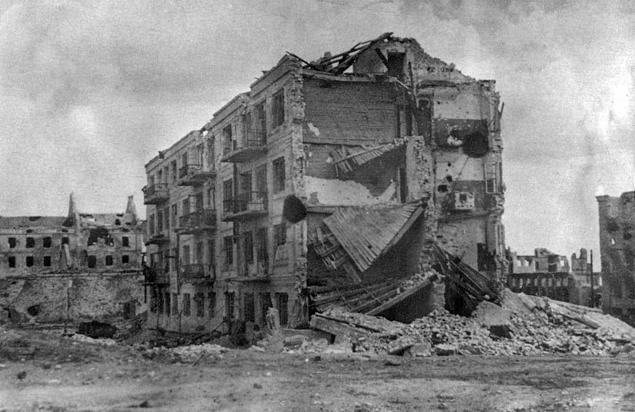
Pavlov's House in 1943. Gerhardt’s Mill is in the background to the left

In keeping with Stalin's Order No. 227—"not one step back"—Sergeant Pavlov was ordered to fortify the building and defend it to the last bullet and the last man. Taking this advice to heart, Pavlov ordered the building to be surrounded with four layers of barbed wire and landmines, and set up machine-gun posts in every available window facing the square. In the early stages of the defense, Pavlov discovered that an anti-tank rifle—a PTRS-41—he had mounted on the roof was particularly effective when used to ambush unsuspecting German tanks. Once the tanks had approached to within range of the weapon, their thin turret-roof armor was exposed to AT rifle fire from above, and they were unable to elevate their weapons enough to retaliate.

For better internal communication, Pavlov's soldiers breached the walls in the basement and upper floors, and dug a communications trench to Soviet positions outside. Supplies were brought in via the trench or by boats crossing the river, defying German air raids and shelling. Nevertheless, food and especially water was in short supply. Lacking beds, the soldiers tried to sleep on insulation wool torn off pipes but were subjected to harassing fire every night in order to try to break their resistance.

The Germans attacked the building several times a day. Each time German infantry or tanks tried to cross the square and to close in on the house, Pavlov's men laid down a withering barrage of machine gun and AT rifle fire from the basement, the windows and the roof. The defenders, as well as the civilians hiding in the basement, were eventually relieved by counter-attacking Soviet forces after holding out from 27 September to 25 November 1942.

It has been argued that whilst the house was heavily fortified, there were limited assaults against it. It was amongst the first buildings in Stalingrad to be restored after the war, having received comparatively limited damage. German archives do not support the claim for heavy fighting for the building, and Soviet military archives attach no particular importance to the house as a defensive structure. While the building was originally captured by Pavlov, the commander of the position was Lieutenant Afanasiev. The garrison was disbanded on the night of 24 November, with troops returning to their original units. These units were then sent on the offensive with Pavlov and Afansiev. Many members of the house's garrison were killed and wounded while assaulting the German-held "Milk House" on 26 November 1942.

== Uncertainty on dates ==
Sources conflict on the date at which the siege began, and the date at which the Soviet reinforcements reached the building and lifted the siege.

"[...] the defenders of Pavlov's House who participated in it's [sic] defense from 26 September 1942 till 25 November 1942." (60 days)

"One of the most famous episodes of the Stalingrad battle was the defence of 'Pavlov's house', which lasted for fifty-eight days."

== Symbolic meaning ==
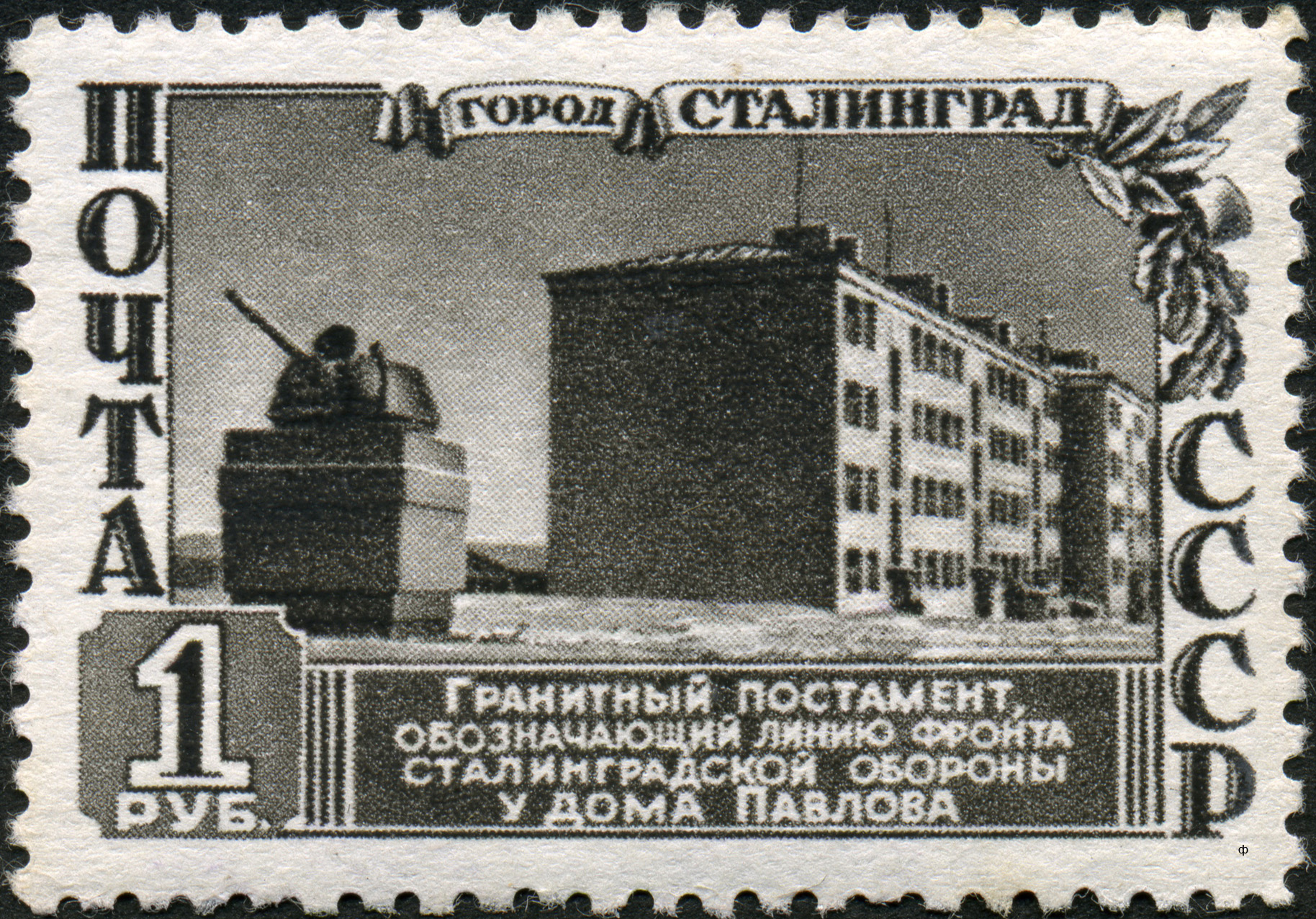
Pavlov's House on a 1950 stamp

Pavlov's House became a symbol of the stubborn and dogged resistance of the Soviet forces during the Battle of Stalingrad, which eventually ended in a decisive victory for the Soviet forces after months of fighting and heavy casualties on both sides. The inability of the German blitzkrieg to make headway against such grinding and self-sacrificial attrition warfare made the failure to capture Pavlov's House, despite numerous attempts, stand out as a symbol of resistance against a supposedly superior force.

Vasily Chuikov, commanding general of the Soviet forces in Stalingrad, later joked that the Germans lost more men trying to take Pavlov's House than they did taking Paris.

Pavlov's "House" was rebuilt after the battle and is used as an apartment building today. There is an attached memorial constructed from bricks picked up after the battle on the eastern side facing the Volga.

Pavlov was awarded the title Hero of the Soviet Union for his actions.

== Cultural references ==
The symbolic significance of Pavlov's House has been recognized in popular culture. In the 2003 video game Call of Duty, a mission titled "Pavlov's House" allows players to engage in a fictionalized version of the defense, highlighting the historical event's lasting impact. The defense of Pavlov's House also features in the stand-alone expansion pack Gates of Hell: Ostfront for the 2018 video game Call to Arms, and the structure appears as a strong point on the "Stalingrad" map in the 2021 video game Hell Let Loose.

The 2024 virtual reality game Pavlov clarifies in a loading screen tip that its "name is derived from Pavlov's House during the battle of Stalingrad in WWII".

In December 2022, 80 years after the event, Osprey Games released a board game titled Undaunted: Stalingrad. The game has been highly praised and largely focuses on Pavlov's House and the surrounding areas.

== Recent reporting ==
A Russian TV documentary in 2009, Legendary Redoubt, (Легендарный редут) on the Russian Channel One reported on Pavlov's House.

The last member of Pavlov's group, Kamoljon Turgunov from Turakurgan District, Namangan Region, Uzbekistan died on 16 March 2015, aged 93.

After the war Pavlov communicated little with his ex-comrades, with many of them bewildered by his fame and in disagreement with the story that had been built around Pavlov. In 1985 a memorial was erected, listing the names of the garrison.

== See also ==
- Sihang Warehouse
