= 1st Guards Airborne Division =

1st Guards Airborne Division (1942–1945) 124th Guards Rifle Division (1945–1946; 1953–1956) 20th Guards Rifle Brigade (1946–1953)
- Active: 1942–1956
- Country: Soviet Union
- Allegiance: Red Army
- Branch: Airborne/Infantry
- Engagements: World War II; Battle of Korsun–Cherkassy; Uman–Botoșani offensive; Second Jassy–Kishinev offensive; Battle of Debrecen; Siege of Budapest; Bratislava–Brno offensive; Prague offensive; Khingan–Mukden offensive
- Decorations: Order of the Red Banner; Order of Suvorov, 2nd class
- Battle honours: Zvenigorod; Bucharest

The 1st Guards Zvenigorod–Bucharest Red Banner Order of Suvorov Airborne Division (Russian: 1-я гвардейская воздушно-десантная Звенигородско-Бухарестская Краснознамённая ордена Суворова дивизия) was a division of the Soviet Airborne Troops. The division was first formed in December 1942 and fought in the Battle of the Dnieper, the Battle of the Korsun–Cherkassy Pocket, the Uman–Botoșani offensive, the second Jassy–Kishinev offensive, the Battle of Debrecen, the siege of Budapest and the Prague offensive. In August 1945 it was sent east and fought in the Soviet invasion of Manchuria. The division became the 124th Guards Rifle Division in November 1945 and disbanded in 1956.

== History ==
The division was formed in accordance with an order from 8 December 1942 from the 4th Airborne Corps headquarters and the 1st Airborne Brigade.

The division became part of the Special Group commanded by Mikhail Khozin. In mid-February 1943, it was concentrated south of Zaluceni. Its objective was to advance into a breach in the German lines in the 1st Shock Army offensive zone. In March, the division fought in the Staraya Russa operation, but was unable to capture the town. In August, it made another attempt and cut the Staraya Russa-Kholm road on 18 August. It then advanced to the Porus River at the villages of Chirikov and Kotov. The division entrenched in positions there. After the end of the fighting, it was sent to the rear to rest and refit; in September, it was transferred to the Steppe Front.

It fought in the capture of Left-bank Ukraine in the area east of Kremenchug. On 9 October, it crossed the Dnieper near Moldavan Island and the villages of Soloshino and Perevolochna. October 9, 1943, crossed the Dnieper near the island of Moldovans, Soloshino, Perevolochna, advancing in the second echelon of the 37th Army. From October to December, the division advanced towards Krivoy Rog and Kirovograd.

In January and February 1944, the division fought in the Korsun–Shevchenkovsky offensive and took part in the encirclement of German troops around Zvenigorod. The division was awarded the honorific "Zvenigorod" for its actions during the fighting on 13 February. Between March and April, it fought in the Uman–Botoșani offensive. During the offensive, the division reached the Dniester and Dubăsari. During the summer it fought in the second Jassy–Kishinev offensive. During the offensive, it advanced in the second echelon of 53rd Army towards Focșani. On 31 August, it entered Bucharest. At the end of September, the division reached the Hungarian border northwest of Arad. On 6 October, it launched an offensive from there during the Battle of Debrecen and reached the Tisza. The division crossed the Tisza in November during the Budapest offensive.

By February 1945, the division was positioned on the Hron. It fought in the Bratislava–Brno offensive in April and the Prague offensive in May. During June and July, the division was transferred to Choibalsan in Mongolia, along with the 53rd Army. It became part of the 18th Guards Rifle Corps. In August 1945, it fought in the Khingan–Mukden offensive operation, part of the Soviet invasion of Manchuria. At the end of the war, it was in Tongliao, where the division conducted its first airborne operation.

On 5 December 1945 the division became the 124th Guards Rifle Division, still with the 18th Guards Rifle Corps in the East Siberian Military District. The division relocated to Nizhneudinsk, Irkutsk Oblast in the spring of 1946. It became the 20th Separate Guards Rifle Brigade there and was directly subordinated to the district as a result of postwar troop reductions. In October 1953 it was upgraded to a division again. The East Siberian Military District became the 31st Rifle Corps of the Transbaikal Military District around this time. The division thus became part of the 31st Rifle Corps. On 4 April 1956, the division was disbanded.

== Composition ==
The 1st Guards Airborne Division included the following units.

- 3rd Guards Airborne Regiment (formed from 8th Airborne Brigade)
- 6th Guards Airborne Regiment (formed from 9th Airborne Brigade)
- 13th Guards Airborne Regiment (formed from 214th Airborne Brigade)
- 4th Guards Airborne Artillery Regiment
- 2nd Guards Airborne Antitank Battalion
- 5th Separate Guards Airborne Reconnaissance Company
- 11th Field Bakery
- 13th Veterinary Hospital
- 2464th Field Post Office

== Subordination ==
| Date | Front | Army | Corps |
|---|---|---|---|
| 1 April 1943 | Reserve of the Supreme High Command (RVGK) | | |
| 1 February 1943 | RVGK | | |
| 1 March 1943 | Northwestern Front | 68th Army | |
| 1 April 1943 | Northwestern Front | 68th Army | |
| 1 May 1943 | Northwestern Front | 68th Army | |
| 1 June 1943 | Northwestern Front | 34th Army | 12th Guards Rifle Corps |
| 1 July 1943 | Northwestern Front | 34th Army | 12th Guards Rifle Corps |
| 1 August 1943 | Northwestern Front | 34th Army | 12th Guards Rifle Corps |
| 1 September 1943 | RVGK | | 82nd Rifle Corps |
| 1 October 1943 | Steppe Front | 37th Army | 82nd Rifle Corps |
| 1 November 1943 | 2nd Ukrainian Front | 37th Army | 57th Rifle Corps |
| 1 December 1943 | 2nd Ukrainian Front | 37th Army | 57th Rifle Corps |
| 1 January 1944 | 2nd Ukrainian Front | 37th Army | |
| 1 February 1944 | 2nd Ukrainian Front | 53rd Army | 26th Guards Rifle Corps |
| 1 March 1944 | 2nd Ukrainian Front | 53rd Army | |
| 1 April 1944 | 2nd Ukrainian Front | 53rd Army | 49th Rifle Corps |
| 1 May 1944 | 2nd Ukrainian Front | 53rd Army | 49th Rifle Corps |
| 1 June 1944 | 2nd Ukrainian Front | 53rd Army | 49th Rifle Corps |
| 1 July 1944 | 2nd Ukrainian Front | 53rd Army | 49th Rifle Corps |
| 1 August 1944 | 2nd Ukrainian Front | 53rd Army | |
| 1 September 1944 | 2nd Ukrainian Front | 53rd Army | 49th Rifle Corps |
| 1 October 1944 | 2nd Ukrainian Front | 53rd Army | 49th Rifle Corps |
| 1 November 1944 | 2nd Ukrainian Front | 53rd Army | 49th Rifle Corps |
| 1 December 1944 | 2nd Ukrainian Front | 53rd Army | 57th Rifle Corps |
| 1 January 1945 | 2nd Ukrainian Front | 53rd Army | 24th Guards Rifle Corps |
| 1 February 1945 | 2nd Ukrainian Front | 53rd Army | 49th Rifle Corps |
| 1 March 1945 | 2nd Ukrainian Front | 53rd Army | 49th Rifle Corps |
| 1 April 1945 | 2nd Ukrainian Front | 53rd Army | 57th Rifle Corps |
| 1 May 1945 | 2nd Ukrainian Front | 53rd Army | 49th Rifle Corps |
| 3 September 1945 | Transbaikal Front | 53rd Army | 18th Guards Rifle Corps |
