= 4th Airborne Corps =

- Active: 1941–1942
- Country: Soviet Union
- Branch: Soviet Airborne
- Type: Airborne
- Size: Corps
- Engagements: World War II: Vyazma airborne operation

Commanders
- Notable commanders: Alexander Kazankin; Aleksey Semenovich Zhadov

The 4th Airborne Corps was a Corps of the Red Army during World War II. It fought in the Vyazma airborne operation, an unsuccessful landing during the Rzhev-Vyazma Offensive.

== History ==
The corps was formed in late May 1941 in the Western Special Military District from the personnel of the 214th Airborne Brigade. The corps was commanded by Aleksey Semenovich Zhadov. On 22 June 1941, the corps was stationed in the Western Front's second echelon in Pukhavichy in Minsk Region. On June 26th, the corps was ordered to conduct an air-assault and ground attack with the 20th Mechanized Corps to stop advancing German troops at Slutsk. The corps did not have transport aircraft and instead attacked on foot. The counterattack failed and both corps were broken through. In late June, the 214th Airborne Brigade was redeployed by truck to the area Glusha, Staryya Darohi, and Hlusk to operate in the rear of the German group advancing on Babruysk.

The main forces of the corps, the 7th and 8th Airborne Brigades, went into action in early July 1941 at the bend of the Berezina River in the area of the Berezina and the Svisloch River, and then retreated to the east in the area of Mahilyow. On and after 8 July, the transports of the 409th Rifle Regiment and the remainder of the 624th Rifle Regiment, part of the 137th Rifle Division, were separated from the forward elements of the division. They were still approaching Krichev and later joined the 7th Airborne Brigade. The brigades were taken out of line for refitting in the rear on 10 July.

The Battle of Smolensk forced the 4th Airborne Corps (7th and 8th Airborne Brigades) to re-enter combat in the Krychaw area on 16 July 1941. On 18 July, the German army captured Krychaw, then crossed the Sozh and captured a bridgehead. From 19 July, the 4th Airborne Corps attempted to recapture the town. Its combined detachment broke into the town on 29 July but was destroyed on the next day by a German force that reoccupied the town. In August, in a renewed German offensive, the corps was surrounded and broke out of encirclement in the region of Unecha, Pogar, and Starodub; some units broke out in the area of Trubchevsk. In September 1941, the corps was sent to be reformed beyond the Volga River in Povolzhye. In December, after training, the corps was transferred to Kaluga, now composed of the 8th, 9th and 214th Airborne Brigades. On 15 December, one battalion of the 214th Airborne Brigade (415 men) was airdropped to the west of Klin to secure the only road to Teryaevo Sloboda and prevent a German retreat to Volokolamsk.

On 15 January 1942, the corps was airdropped to the Ozerechnya area (35km southwest of Vyazma). The 8th Airborne Brigade was airdropped, but due to changes in the situation, it was deemed inappropriate to airdrop the entire corps, and the remainder of the corps was withdrawn to Lyubertsy. In the Vyazma airborne operation, as part of the Rzhev-Vyazma offensive, the corps was airdropped behind German lines in the Yukhnov direction (25 kilometers south of Vyazma) from 18 to 23 February. 7,373 paratroopers and 1,524 bales of ammunition and equipment were dropped. In March, the corps occupied the area of Klyuchi, Tynovka, Yurkino, Petrishchevo, Novaya, and Verterhovo station. From 18 March, the corps was forced on the defensive and suffered heavy losses. On 11 April, it was subordinated to the 1st Guards Cavalry Corps. The corps operated behind enemy lines in complete isolation from the main forces until June, when it was ordered leave its position and managed to break out of the encirclement on 28 June.

In August 1942, the corps was re-formed as the 38th Guards Rifle Division. In the second half of 1942, the corps was formed again, but was not involved in the fighting, and in December 1942 was used to form the 1st Guards Airborne Division.

== Subordination ==
- Western Front, front subordination - 1 July 1941 (except for the 214th Airborne Brigade)
- Western Front, 13th Army - from early July 1941
- Volga Military District, formation, 1 October 1941
- Stavka of the Supreme High Command reserve - 1 January 1942
- Moscow Military District - 1 April 1942

== Composition ==
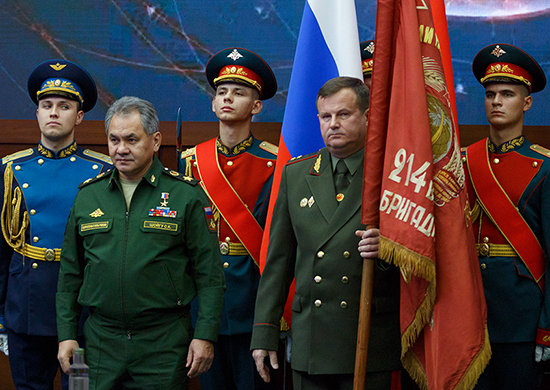
Belarusian Defence Minister Andrei Ravkov with Russian Defence Minister Sergey Shoygu holding the banner of the 214th Airborne Brigade.

- 214th Airborne Brigade - Formed in 1938 in Marina Gorka on the basis of the 47th Special Purpose Airborne Brigade. It participated in the Soviet invasion of Poland, the Winter War, and the Soviet occupation of Bessarabia and Northern Bukovina. From the start of Operation Barbarossa, it mostly fought in isolation from the corps' main forces. On 28 June 1941, it was subordinated to the 210th Motorized Division. The brigade was tasked with conducting airdropped motorized raids in the German rear at Staryya Darohi and Glusk. The landing was successful, but the brigade was surrounded after the retreat of the 210th Motorized Division and spent two months fighting behind German lines in the Minsk area. In late August, the brigade broke through and reached the 21st Army. On 28 August, it was concentrated on the southwestern outskirts of Mena. On 5 September, it defended the southern bank of the Desna River near Butovka station. After it was relieved in defense, the brigade was withdrawn to the army reserve in the Shapovalovka area. In December, a battalion of the brigade was airdropped and remained behind German lines for 9 days, attacking moving columns, destroying small garrisons and bridges, and setting fires to gasoline tankers. In total, the battalion blew up 29 bridges, burned 48 tankers, neutralized 2 tanks, and killed at least 400 German soldiers. Operating in small sabotage groups against enemy communications in a large area, the battalion forced the German army to abandon heavy weapons.
- 7th Airborne Brigade - Formed in the spring of 1941 from the line units of the 201st and 224th Rifle Divisions. On 1 July, it was transferred to defend the crossings over the Berezina River at Berezino. It arrived on 3 July, but was pushed back from the shore and unsuccessfully attacked the German bridgehead. As a result, it was forced to retreat in the direction of the corps' retreat. In March 1942, it joined the 5th Airborne Corps.
- 8th Airborne Brigade - Formed in the spring of 1941 from the line units of the 231st Rifle Division. On 30 June, it was transferred to the Svislach river line and fought small German groups. It retreated in the direction of the corps' retreat. Between 27 January to 1 February 1942, 2,081 men out of 3,062 in the brigade, 120 light machine guns, 72 anti-tank rifles, and 20 82mm mortars and 30 other mortars were airdropped behind German lines in the Ozerechnya area; 76 men from the 214th Airborne Brigade were also airdropped with the brigade. However, the landing was not entirely successful; the men were scattered across the territory. By 1 February, only 746 paratroopers had reached the rallying point at Androsov; the rest were either killed, captured, or joined partisan detachments. For the next seven days, the brigade fought a series of battles, and on 7 February, established contact with the 41st Cavalry Division of the 1st Guards Cavalry Force and was subordinated to that unit on 12 February until 7 April, when it reunited with the 4th Airborne Corps.
- 9th Airborne Brigade - Formed in the spring of 1941 from the line units of the 203rd Rifle Division and was initially part of the 5th Airborne Corps. In March 1942, the brigade became part of the 4th Airborne Corps.

== Commanders ==
- Colonel Alexander Kazankin (May - 22 June 1941)
- Major General Aleksey Zhadov (23 June - 2 August 1941)
- Colonel Mikhail Grishin (August 1941)
- Colonel Alexander Kazankin (August - November 1941)
- Major General Aleksei Levashev (November 1941 - February 1942; killed in action)
- Major General Alexander Kazankin (February - December 1942)

== Bibliography ==
- Glantz, David M. (2010). Barbarossa Derailed: The German Advance to Smolensk, the Encirclement Battle, and the First and Second Soviet Counteroffensives, 10 July – 24 August 1941. Philadelphia: Casemate. ISBN 9781906033729.
- Справочник на сайте клуба "Память" Воронежского госуниверситета
- Участие ВДВ в Великой Отечественной войне 1941-1945 гг.
- Дорогами воздушного десанта
- Белорусские хроники, 1941 год. На южном фланге Западного фронта
- Советские воздушно-десантные. Военно-исторический очерк. — Moscow : Voenizdat, 1986, 2-е изд.
- Свердлов Ф. Д., 4-й воздушно-десантный корпус, Moscow, Монолит, 2002
