= 12th Guards Rifle Corps =

- Active: 1942–1946
- Country: Soviet Union
- Branch: Red Army
- Type: Infantry
- Engagements: World War II; Vistula-Oder Offensive; East Pomeranian Offensive; Battle of Berlin
- Decorations: Order of the Red Banner

Commanders
- Notable commanders: Alexander Kazankin

The 12th Guards Rifle Corps was a corps of the Soviet Union's Red Army. Formed in 1942, the corps fought in the Vistula–Oder Offensive, East Pomeranian Offensive and Berlin Offensive. The corps was awarded the Order of the Red Banner for its actions during the storming of Berlin. It was disbanded in Germany in June 1946.

== History ==
The corps was first formed on the Northwestern Front in December 1942, on the basis of the 384th Rifle Division. It was commanded by Major General Nikanor Zakhvatayev. In May 1944, Zakhvatayev was transferred to command the 1st Shock Army. He was replaced by Major General Mikhail Siyazov. On 29 July, Siyazov became 67th Army deputy commander and was replaced by Major General Stepan Bunkov.

On November 3, 1944 the corps included the 23rd Guards, 52nd Guards and 33rd Rifle Divisions as part of the 3rd Shock Army. It was the main force moving forward to the railway line Auce – Layzhuva. On 2 December, the corps was part of Stavka Reserve and received orders to concentrate south of Jelgava for loading onto troop transports at the Jelgava, Platone, Meitene and Joniškis. At the beginning of January 1945, trains carrying elements of the corps arrived at Mrozy, 50 kilometers east of Warsaw. The corps was concentrated 25 kilometers east of Warsaw, in the area of Mińsk Mazowiecki, Kałuszyn, Liw and Dobre. On 14 January, the Vistula–Oder Offensive was launched. The corps was part of the army reserve in the early days of the offensive. On 19 January, the corps moved to bypass Warsaw from the north. On the morning of 20 January, the corps was in the area of Sochaczew, Lovach and Skierniewice. By the end of 25 January, it was in the area of Izbica, Kolo and Klodawa. By the end of January, the corps had reached Bromberg. The 33rd and 52nd Guards Rifle Divisions positioned themselves at Bushkovo, Tsempelburg and Kline-Visnevka. The 23rd Guards Rifle Division was stationed in the second echelon. The 32nd and 15th SS Infantry Divisions made several attacks against the corps, supported by tanks. These attacks were repulsed.

Bunkov was sent to study at the Military Academy of the General Staff on 12 February and replaced by Lieutenant General Alexander Kazankin. The 23rd and 52nd Guards Rifle Divisions took up defensive positions on the east bank of the Oder between Nieder-Krenina and Alt-Rudnitz. From 16 April, the corps was involved in the Battle of Berlin. Kazankin was wounded on 27 April during the fighting for Berlin. He was replaced by 3rd Shock Army deputy commander Major General Alexander Filatov. On the morning of 2 May, the German troops began to surrender and the fighting ended soon after. On 11 June, the corps was awarded the Order of the Red Banner for its actions at Berlin.

The corps appears to have been disbanded in June 1946, still part of the 3rd Shock Army.
