= 68th Army =

- 68-я армия
- Active: February 1943 - November 1943
- Country: Soviet Union
- Branch: Red Army
- Size: Field army
- Part of: Northwestern Front
- Engagements: World War II: Operation Polyarnaya Zvezda; Battle of Demyansk (1943); Staraya-Russa Offensive (1943); Battle of Smolensk (1943)

Commanders
- Notable commanders: Fyodor Tolbukhin

The 68th Army (Russian: 68-я армия) was a field army of the Soviet Union's Red Army. It was formed in February 1943 from the headquarters of the 57th Army and fought in the Battle of Demyansk (1943) and the Staraya-Russa Offensive (1943), part of Operation Polyarnaya Zvezda. After spending several months in reserve, the army fought in the Battle of Smolensk (1943) between August and October. The army was disbanded in November and its troops became part of the 5th Army.

== History ==
=== Operation Polyarnaya Zvezda ===
The 68th Army was formed on 1 February 1943 based on a Stavka directive dated 30 January, from the headquarters of the 57th Army. It consisted of the 37th Rifle Division, the 1st Guards, 5th Guards, 7th Guards, 8th Guards, and 10th Guards Airborne Divisions, the 32nd, 33rd, and 137th Rifle Brigades, the 26th Ski Brigade and other units. After the formation of the army under command of Fyodor Tolbukhin it became part of Group Khozin. In mid-February, it concentrated south of Zaluchye to attack northwest towards Luga in event of a Soviet breakthrough by the 1st Shock Army during the Battle of Demyansk, part of Operation Polyarnaya Zvezda, an attempt to lift the Siege of Leningrad. Group Khozin was not committed to the battle as the attack was repulsed. The German troops in the Demyansk Salient then withdrew back to the Lovat River.As a result of the changed situation, the 68th Army became part of the Northwestern Front on 13 March. Yevgeny Zhuravlev replaced Tolbukhin around this time. The army conducted the Staraya Russa Offensive in the area between the Lovat and Redya Rivers. Until May the army defended the line of the Redya.

=== Battle of Smolensk (1943) ===
On 5 May the army became part of Reserve of the Supreme High Command (Stavka Reserve). In reserve the army received eight newly formed rifle divisions.On 12 July it was transferred to the Western Front and fought in the Battle of Smolensk from 7 August. The army was to be committed in the second echelon and spearhead the advance on Roslavl and Smolensk, advancing along the Yukhnov-Roslavl Highway.During the operation, the army in conjunction with other troops of the Western and Kalinin Fronts defeated troops on the left wing of Army Group Centre and captured many towns in Smolensk Oblast. The army captured Smolensk on 25 September along with the 5th and 31st Armies. The army then advanced into eastern Belarus. 68th Army was disbanded on 5 November. Its troops became part of the 5th Army.

== Army commanders ==
- Lieutenant General Fyodor Tolbukhin (February 3 - March 21, 1943);
- Major General, on September 9, 1943 Lieutenant General Yevgeny Zhuravlev (March 21 - October 24, 1943)
