= 36th Separate Guards Motor Rifle Brigade =

36th Guards Motor Rifle Brigade (2009–present) 131st Guards Motor Rifle Division (2001–2009) 131st Guards Machine-Gun Artillery Division (1989–2001) 38th Guards Motor Rifle Division (1957–1989) 38th Guards Rifle Division (1942–1957)
- Russian: 36-я гвардейская мотострелковая Лозовская Краснознамённая бригада
- Active: 1942–present
- Country: Soviet Union (1942–1991); Russia (1991–present)
- Branch: Red Army (1942–1946) Soviet Army (1946–1991) Russian Ground Forces (1991–present)
- Type: Motorized infantry brigade
- Part of: 29th Guards Combined Arms Army; Eastern Military District
- Garrison/HQ: Borzya, Zabaykalsky Krai
- Engagements: World War II; Russo-Ukrainian War; Russian invasion of Ukraine; Eastern Ukraine campaign; Battle of Vuhledar
- Decorations: Guards; Order of the Red Banner
- Battle honours: Lozovaya

Commanders
- Current commander: Guards Lieutenant Colonel Andrey Vladimirovich Voronkov

The 36th Guards Lozovaya Red Banner Motor Rifle Brigade (Russian: 36-я отдельная гвардейская мотострелковая Лозовская Краснознамённая бригада; MUN 06705) is an infantry brigade of the Russian Ground Forces, which traces its heritage to the creation of the 38th Guards Rifle Division from the 4th Airborne Corps during World War II. The division gained its honorific on 23 September 1943 for its part in the seizure of Lozovaya in Ukraine.

== History ==
The historical predecessor of the military unit is the 47th Special Purpose Airborne Brigade, formed in 1932, on the basis of which the 214th Airborne Brigade was formed in 1938. On the eve of the Great Patriotic War, the brigade was deployed into the 4th Airborne Corps, which took an active part in the Operation Barbarossa. In August 1942, the corps was reformed into the 38th Guards Rifle Division, which went through the entire war, meeting its end on the territory of Germany.

36th Separate Guards Motor Rifle Brigade together with 38th Separate Guards Air Assault Brigade during the exercise "Union Resolve 2022" near Brest, Belarus.

In 1957, the division was reorganized into a motorized rifle division, becoming the 38th Guards Motorized Rifle Lozovskaya Red Banner Division. The location was the Chita Oblast on the territory of the Transbaikal Military District, where the division was part of the 36th Combined Arms Army. The division was moved to Sretensk in Chita Oblast in 1967. In October 1989, the division was reformed into the 131st Guards Machine-Gun Artillery Division with a location in the village of Yasnaya in the Chita Oblast. The division moved its headquarters to Olovyannaya in Olovyanninsky District in Chita Oblast in 1992. In August 2001 it was again converted into a motor rifle division.

Since June 2009, the division has been reformed into the 36th Separate Guards Motorized Rifle Brigade, while retaining all its combat regalia, military glory, and historical record and moved to Borzya. In 2011, the brigade was armed with T-72B1 tanks, BMP-2 infantry fighting vehicles, 2S3 self-propelled howitzers, Grad MLRS, MT-12 anti-tank guns, Shturm-S anti-tank missile systems, Buk-M1, Tunguska, Strela-10, Shilka, MANPADS Igla.

=== Participation in combat operations during Russian invasion of Ukraine ===
The brigade took part in the Russia's invasion of Ukraine, in particular since the fall of 2022 was involved in the Battle of Vuhledar. On 20 February 2024, the Ukrainian Armed Forces launched two HIMARS missiles at a training ground near the village of Trudivske while brigade servicemen were forming up there. The 4th, 5th and 6th companies of the brigade came under attack, as a result of the attack, 68 people were killed. It was later reported that an officer in the brigade was actively working with Ukrainian intelligence and had caused the training ground to be targeted.

== Structure ==
=== Structure in 2017 ===
- Command;
- 1st motorized rifle battalion;
- 2nd motorized rifle battalion;
- 3rd motorized rifle battalion;
- tank battalion;
- anti-aircraft missile division;
- anti-aircraft division;
- 1st howitzer self-propelled artillery division;
- 2nd howitzer self-propelled artillery division;
- rocket artillery division;
- reconnaissance battalion;
- unmanned aerial vehicle company;
- engineer and sapper battalion;
- communications battalion;
- logistics battalion;
- control and artillery reconnaissance battery;
- anti-tank guided missile battery;
- separate NBC protection company;
- separate electronic warfare company;
- rifle company (snipers);
- commandant company;
- repair company
- medical company;
- military police platoon;
- air defense control platoon;
- orchestra.

== Commanders ==
- Guards Colonel Rustam Usmanovich Muradov (2009–2012)
- Guards Major General Oleg Lvovich Moyseeev (2018–2020)
- Lieutenant Colonel (Guards) Andrei Vladimirovich Voronkov (2020–2022; acting)
- Guards Colonel Guseyn Vilayatovich Musayev (2022–20 February 2024)
- Guards Lieutenant Colonel Andrey Vladimirovich Voronkov (2024–present)

== Hero of the Russian Federation ==
- Guards Junior Sergeant Vladimir Ivanovich Belokopytov commander of a combat vehicle of a motorized rifle battalion, 2024.
