= 66th Army =

- 66-я армия
- Active: 1942–1943
- Country: Soviet Union
- Branch: Red Army
- Type: Field army
- Engagements: World War II: Battle of Stalingrad

Commanders
- Notable commanders: Vladimir Kurdyumov Rodion Malinovsky Aleksey Semenovich Zhadov

The 66th Army (Russian: 66-я армия) was a field army of the Red Army. It was established in August 1942 from the 8th Reserve Army. The 66th Army fought to break through to the Volga to the north of Stalingrad during September and October 1942. During Operation Uranus, the Soviet encirclement of German troops in Stalingrad, 66th Army troops linked up with those of the 62nd Army, forming the inner encirclement. Until February the army fought to destroy the pocket and then was held in reserve. In May 1943 it became the 5th Guards Army for its actions during the Battle of Stalingrad.

== Commanders ==
- Vladimir Kurdyumov (05.08.1942 -15.08.1942)
- Stepan Kalinin (15.08.1942 -27.08.1942)
- Rodion Malinovsky (27.08.1942 -14.10.1942)
- Aleksey Semenovich Zhadov (14.10.1942 –16.04.1943)

== Bibliography ==
- Шестьдесят шестая армия // Председатель Главной редакционной комиссии (2004). Военная энциклопедия: В 8 томах [Military Encyclopedia: The 8 volumes] (in Russian). Vol. 8: Таджикский — Яшин. Moscow: Voenizdat. p. 579. ISBN 5-203-01875-8.
