= 5th Guards Army =

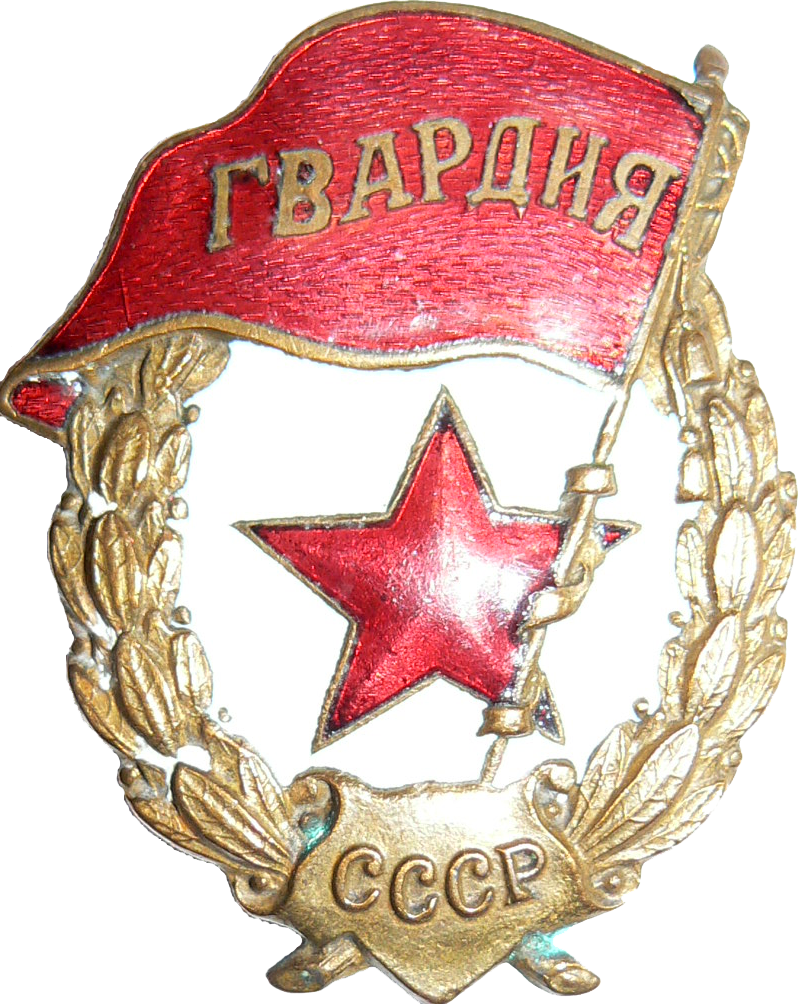
- Active: 1943–1947
- Country: Soviet Union
- Branch: Red Army
- Type: Field army
- Engagements: World War II: Battle of Kursk; Belgorod-Kharkov Offensive Operation; Battle of the Dnieper; Uman–Botoșani Offensive; Lvov–Sandomierz Offensive; Vistula–Oder Offensive; Berlin Offensive; Prague Offensive

Commanders
- Notable commanders: Aleksey Semenovich Zhadov; Afanasy Beloborodov

The 5th Guards Army was a Soviet Guards formation which fought in many critical actions during World War II under the command of General Aleksey Semenovich Zhadov. The 5th Guards Army was formed in spring 1943 from the 66th Army in recognition of that army's actions during the Battle of Stalingrad. The 5th Guards Army fought in the Battle of Kursk, Belgorod-Khar'kov Offensive Operation, Battle of the Dnieper, Uman–Botoșani Offensive, Lvov–Sandomierz Offensive, Vistula–Oder Offensive, Berlin Offensive, and the Prague Offensive. During the Berlin Offensive elements of the army linked up with American troops at Torgau on the Elbe. Postwar, the army was disbanded as part of the Central Group of Forces.

== History ==
On 5 May 1943, the 66th Army was renamed to the 5th Guards Army in accordance with a Stavka directive dated 16 April 1943. It included the 32nd and 33rd Guards Rifle Corps. The 5th Guards Army fought under command of the Steppe, Voronezh, and 2nd and 1st Ukrainian Fronts from 1943 until the end of the war. In 1943, the army fought in the Battle of Kursk at Prokhorovka. The Steppe Front formed the strategic reserve for the battle. On 6 July, the army began moving up from its reserve positions. On 8 July the army was reassigned to the Voronezh Front. On the night of 10 July the army's 33rd Guards Rifle Corps arrived at Prokhorovka. On the night of 11 July the army's 32nd Guards Rifle Corps took up defensive positions on the Psel River at Oboyan, Olkhovatka, Veselyy, and Semyonovka. On the morning of 11 July the advance of the II SS Panzer Corps was checked by the 33rd Guards Rifle Corps' 95th Guards Rifle Division and 9th Guards Airborne Division, operating in conjunction with other units. On 12 July the army's troops in conjunction with the 5th Guards Tank Army fought in the counterattack of the Voronezh Front and the Battle of Prokhorovka. Soldiers of the 9th Guards Airborne Division were carried on the hulls of the tanks during the charge down the slopes in front of Prokhorovka.

In early August, the army fought in the Belgorod-Bogodukhov Offensive. For the offensive, the army was deployed among other armies on a line running from Gertsovka to the northern Donets east of Gostishchevo. On the night of 3 August, the army moved up to its start line. Within three hours of the launch of the offensive on the morning of 3 August, the army had broken through the main German positions. From 12 August 1943, the army fought in the Belgorod-Kharkhov Offensive Operation. On 7 September the army became part of the Steppe Front. During the Battle of the Dnieper, the army helped capture Poltava on 23 September and Kremenchug on 29 September. The army then crossed the Dnieper and seized a bridgehead on its right bank. On 20 October Steppe Front was renamed 2nd Ukrainian Front.

In early January, the 5th Guards Army fought in the Kirovograd Offensive, part of the Dnieper-Carpathian Offensive. In March and April, the army fought in the Uman-Botosani Offensive. In early May, the army reached the Romanian border. On 26 June the army became part of Stavka reserve. On 13 July it was transferred to the 1st Ukrainian Front. By mid-July, its troops were concentrated south of Ternopol. During July and August, the army fought in the Lvov-Sandomierz Offensive. For the next six months after the offensive, the army fought in heavy battles to retain the Sandomierz bridgehead.

In January and February 1945 the 5th Guards Army advanced out of the bridgehead in the Sandomierz–Silesian Offensive. In February and March, the army fought to encircle German troops in Breslau and destroy German troops in the Oppeln pocket. In April and May the army fought in the Berlin Offensive and the Battle of Bautzen.

It was elements of the 5th Guards Army that made contact with the U.S. Army's 69th Infantry Division at Torgau on the Elbe River on 25 April 1945, splitting the Third Reich into two separate parts. The first contact was made between patrols near Strehla, when U.S. First Lieutenant Albert Kotzebue crossed the River Elbe in a boat with three men of an intelligence and reconnaissance platoon. On the east bank, they met forward elements of the 175th Guards Rifle Regiment, part of the 58th Guards Rifle Division of the First Ukrainian Front under the command of Lieutenant Colonel Alexander Gardiev.

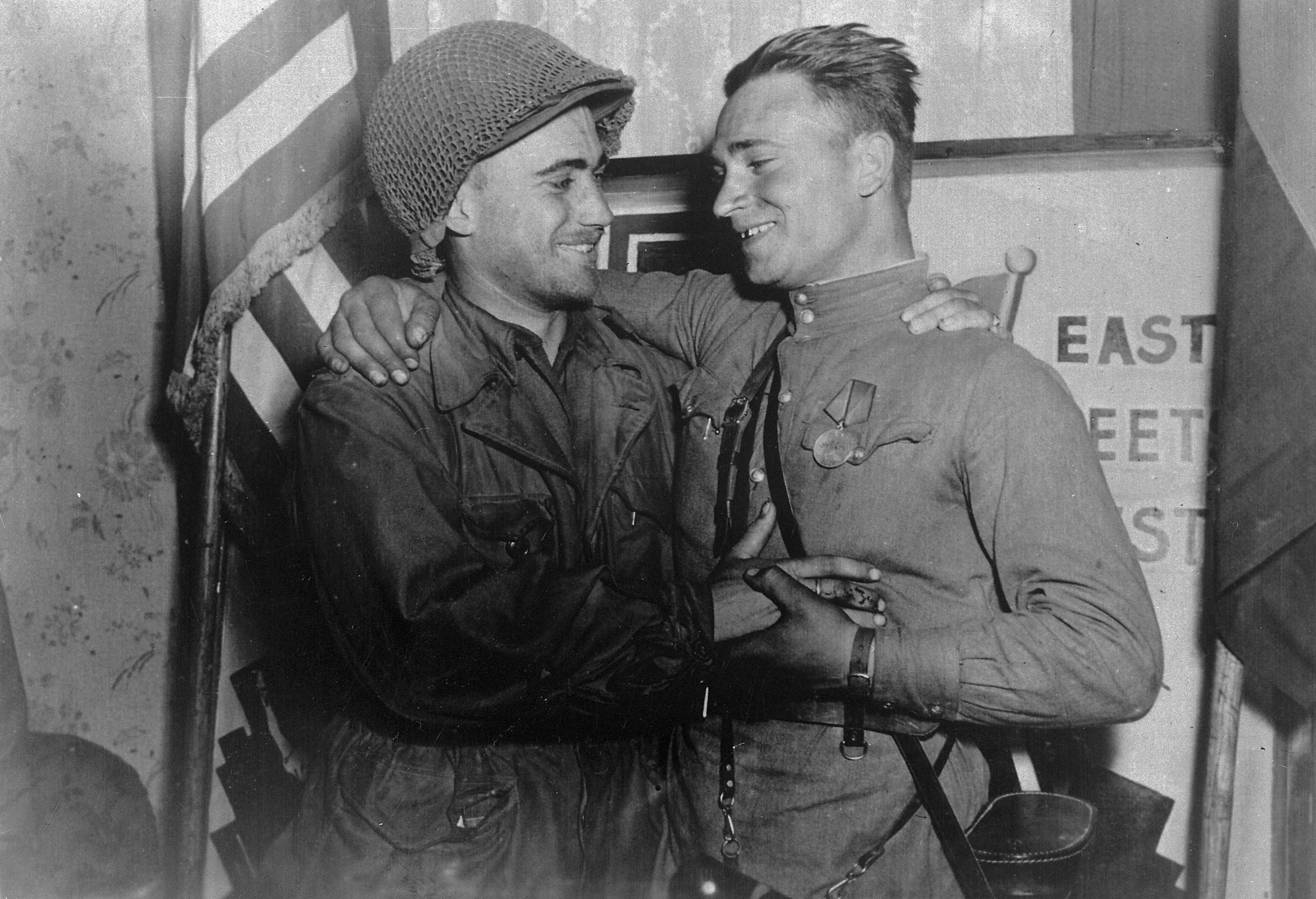
2nd Lt. William Robertson and Lt. Alexander Silvashko, Red Army, shown in front of sign East Meets West symbolizing the historic meeting of the Soviet and American Armies, near Torgau, Germany, an arranged photo op on "Elbe Day".

On 26 April, the commanders of the 69th Infantry Division of the First Army and the 58th Guards Rifle Division of the 5th Guards Army met at Torgau, southwest of Berlin. The same day, another patrol under Second Lieutenant William Robertson with Frank Huff, James McDonnell and Paul Staub met Soviet Lieutenant Alexander Silvashko with some soldiers on the destroyed Elbe bridge of Torgau. The army advanced into Czechoslovakia in early May. Elements of the army liberated Leitmeritz concentration camp on 9–10 May.

At the end of the war, the 5th Guards Army included the 32nd and 33rd Guards Rifle Corps, as well as the 34th Guards Rifle Corps. The army then became part of the Central Group of Forces, possibly based in Austria. In June 1946, the 33rd Guards Rifle Corps was disbanded. On 20 July 1946, Lieutenant General Afanasy Beloborodov became army commander. The army was disbanded on 20 March 1947. Its 14th Guards Mechanized Division became part of the 3rd Guards Mechanized Army. The 32nd Guards Rifle Corps was disbanded a little later in 1947, briefly being included in the 4th Guards Mechanized Army.

== Structure ==
=== 1 May 1945 ===
Rifle forces

- 32nd Guards Rifle Corps
- 33rd Guards Rifle Corps
- 34th Guards Rifle Corps

Artillery forces

- 3rd Penetration Artillery Division
- 155th Cannon Artillery Brigade
- 10th Guards Fighter Anti-Tank Artillery Brigade
- 1073rd Fighter Anti-Tank Artillery Regiment
- 1075th Fighter Anti-Tank Artillery Regiment
- 469th Mortar Regiment
- 308th Guards Mortar Regiment
- 29th Anti-Aircraft Artillery Division

Armoured forces

- 4th Guards Tank Corps
- 150th Tank Brigade
- 39th Separate Tank Regiment
- 226th Separate Tank Regiment
- 1889th Self-Propelled Artillery Regiment

Engineer forces

- 3rd Pontoon-Bridge Brigade
- 55th Engineer Sapper Brigade

== Commanders ==
- Colonel General Aleksey Semenovich Zhadov (5 May 1943 – 20 July 1946)
- Lieutenant General Afanasy Beloborodov (20 July 1946 – 20 March 1947)

== Notes ==
=== Bibliography ===
- Erickson, John (1999) [1983]. The Road to Berlin: Stalin's War with Germany. New Haven, CT, USA: Yale University Press. ISBN 9780300078138.
- Feskov, V.I.; Golikov, V.I.; Kalashnikov, K.A.; Slugin, S.A. (2013). Вооруженные силы СССР после Второй Мировой войны: от Красной Армии к Советской [The Armed Forces of the USSR after World War II: From the Red Army to the Soviet: Part 1 Land Forces] (in Russian). Tomsk: Scientific and Technical Literature Publishing. ISBN 9785895035306.
- Glantz, David M.; House, Jonathan M. (2004) [1999]. The Battle of Kursk. Lawrence, KS, USA: University Press of Kansas. ISBN 978-0-7006-1335-9.
- MacDonald, Charles B. (1973). The Last Offensive. United States Army in World War II: European Theater of Operations. Washington, D.C.: Office of the Chief of Military History. OCLC 963582.
