= Nikolai Nikitin =

Soviet construction engineer (1907–1973)

- Николай Васильевич Никитин
- Nikitin in 1951
- Born: December 15, 1907; Tobolsk, Russian Empire
- Died: March 3, 1973 (aged 65); Moscow, Soviet Union
- Resting place: Novodevichy Cemetery
- Citizenship: Soviet
- Occupation: Architect

Nikolai Vasilyevich Nikitin (Russian: Николай Васильевич Никитин; 15 December 1907 – 3 March 1973) was a Soviet architect, structural designer and construction engineer, best known for his monumental structures.

== Biography ==
=== Early life ===
Nikolai was born in Tobolsk, Russian Empire to the family of a typographical engineer who later worked as a judicial clerk. His father was Vasily Nikitin (1893-1956), who specialized in welding and other elements of electrical engineering. When Nikolai was 17, a snakebite left him with a permanent foot injury.

=== Career ===
In 1930, Nikolai graduated from the Tomsk Technological Institute with training in construction.

In 1932, he designed the train station of Novosibirsk.

By 1937, he was living and working in Moscow. He turned his attention to calculations for the foundation of the monumental Palace of the Soviets which was to be constructed at the site of the demolished Cathedral of Christ the Saviour.

In 1957, he was appointed chief designer of Mosproekt-2 - Institute for the Planning of Housing and Civil Engineering Construction in the City of Moscow.

=== Death ===
Nikolai died on 3 March 1973 and was buried in Novodevichy Cemetery.

== Selected works ==
- Moscow State University's 240 m (787 ft) high main building. At the time of its construction it was the tallest building in Europe. Built from 1949 to 1953.
- Palace of Culture and Science, constructed from 1952 to 1955 also in partnership with Lev Rudnev as main architect.
- Luzhniki Stadium 1956.
- Colossal 85 meter statue on the Mamayev Kurgan heights overlooking Volgograd, The Motherland Calls, used 7900 tons of concrete and steel in a dramatic sculpture design by Yevgeny Vuchetich.
- Ostankino Tower, completed in 1967, at 540 metres (1772 ft), the highest freestanding structure in Eurasia.

== Awards and honors ==
- Honored Builder of the RSFSR (1970)
- Lenin Prize (1970) - for the project of the Ostankino television tower
- Stalin Prize, 3rd class (1951) - for the development of a long-span shed coating and a method for its removal
- Order of the Badge of Honour
- Order of the Red Banner of Labour
