= "Home Front to Front" Memorial =

Monument in Magnitogorsk, Russia

- Magnitogorsk
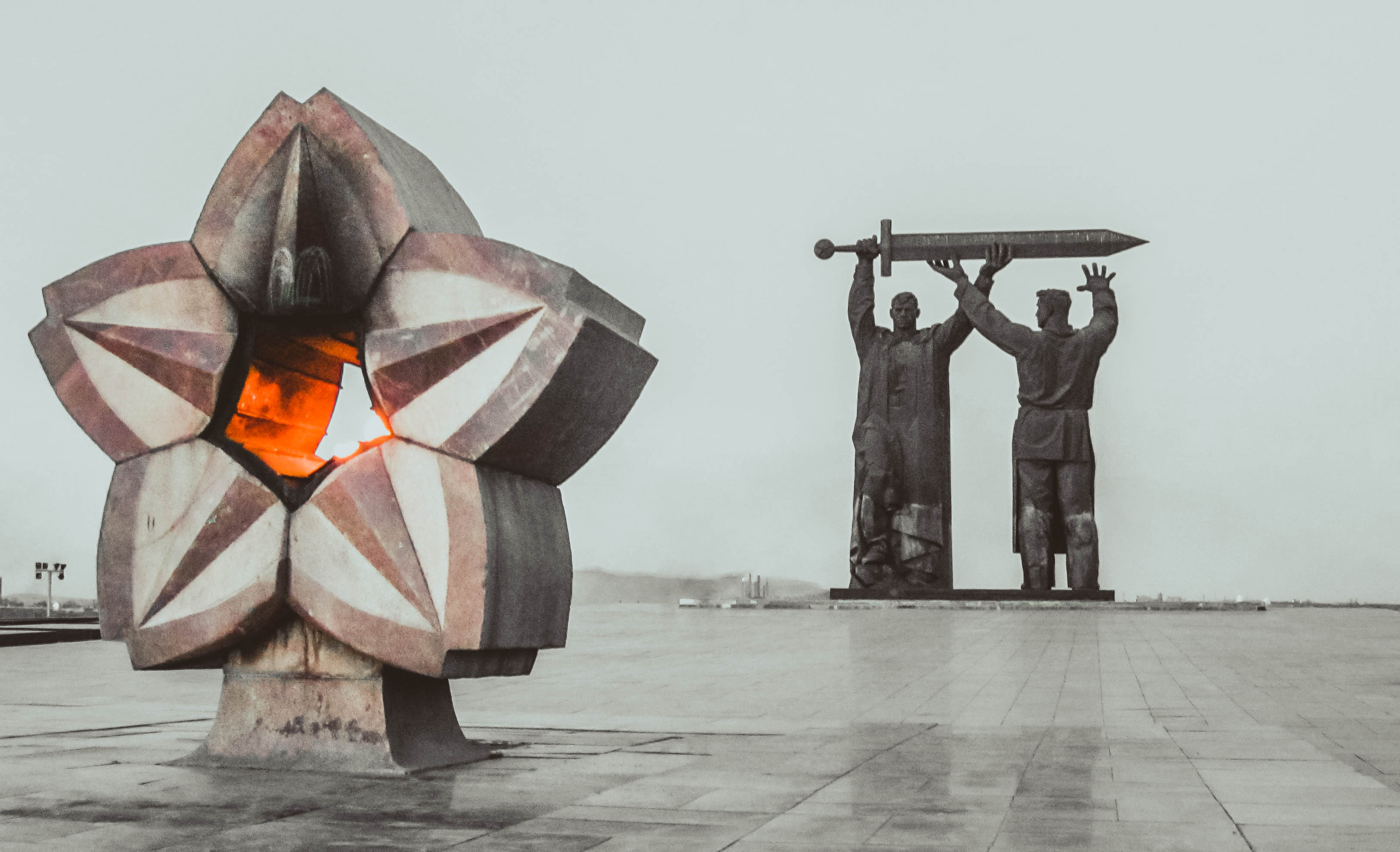
- For The "Great Patriotic War".
- Unveiled: 1979
- Location: 53°24′26″N 58°59′33″E near Magnitogorsk
- Designed by: Lev Golovnitsky and Yakov Belopolsky

The Home Front to Front Memorial (Russian: Памятник «Тыл — фронту») is a bronze and granite monument located in the city of Magnitogorsk, Russia, sculpted by Lev Golovnitsky and drawn by Yakov Belopolsky. It is considered the first part of a triptych that tells the story of the "Victory Sword": the Sword, forged by the metallurgists of Magnitogorsk, was then raised by the Motherland in Stalingrad and lowered after the Victory in Berlin. This monument was unveiled in 1979.

The monument is composed of a home front worker and a warrior. The worker, facing east, towards the Magnitogorsk Iron and Steel Works, passes the sword to the warrior. The warrior is facing west (in the direction where the Great Patriotic War was waged).

The three monuments are made to symbolize the sword being forged in Magnitogorsk, raised in The Motherland Calls in Volgograd (then Stalingrad) and finally dropped to the ground after the victory in Berlin as a part of Warrior Liberator.

The composition includes a stone flower made from Karelian granite with an eternal flame.

On May 6, 2022, the Bank of Russia issued a commemorative coin made of base metal with a nominal value of 10 rubles "Magnitogorsk". The series "Cities of labor valor" (Russian: «Города трудовой доблести»).

== Gallery ==
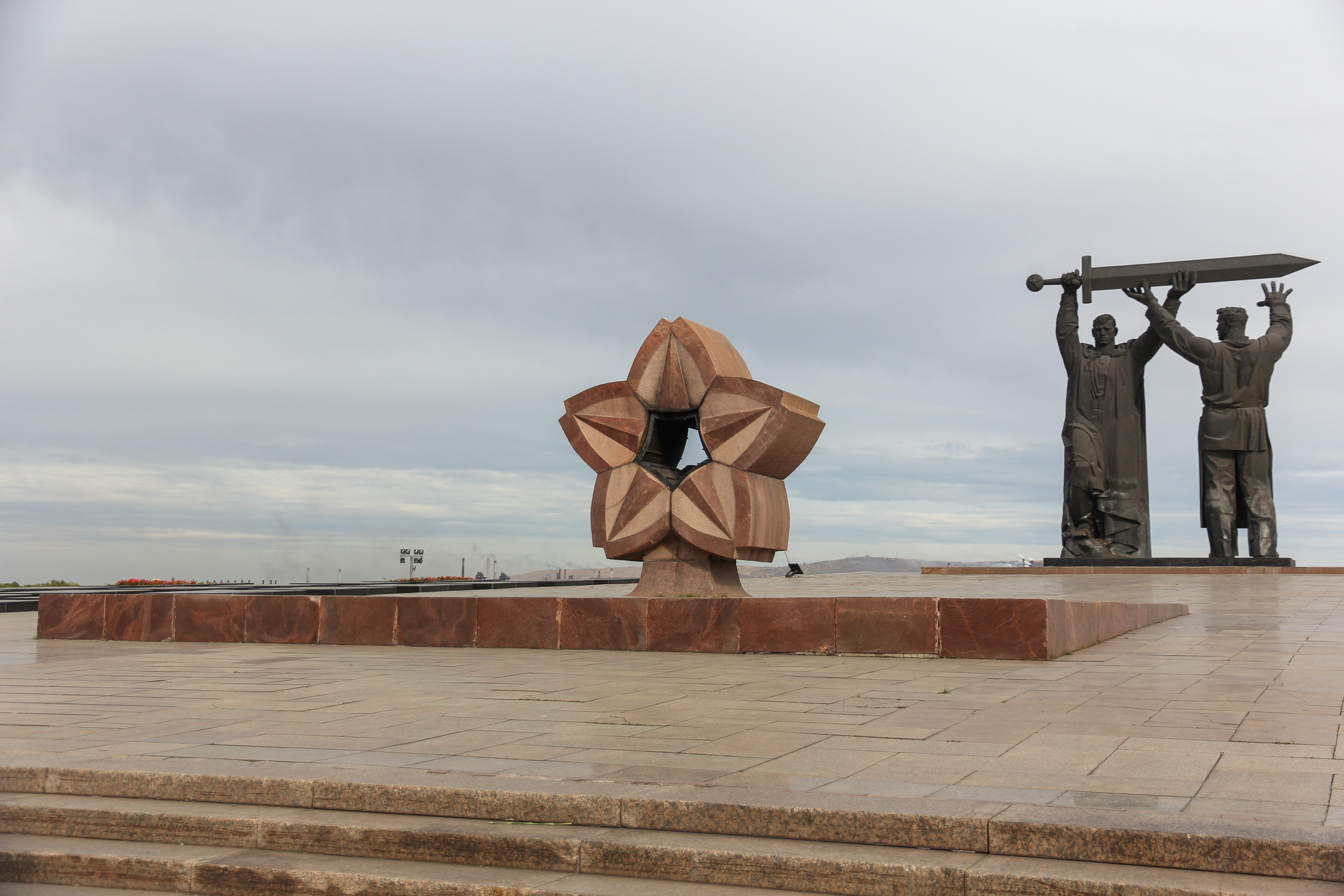

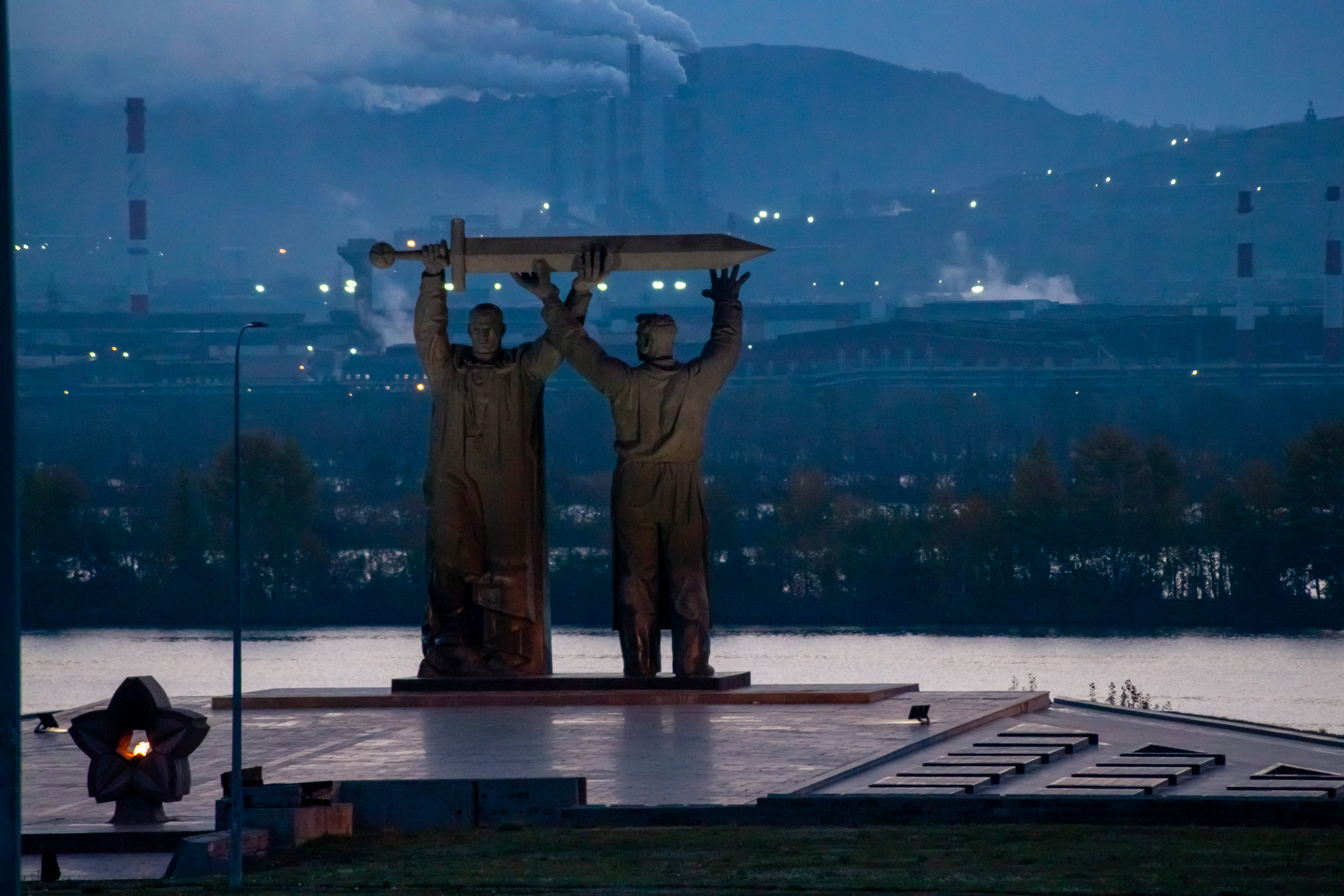

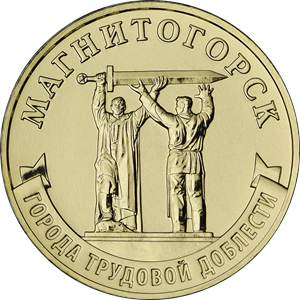
The 10 rubles memorial coin (2022)

== See also ==
- Monuments to home front workers and children of war
