= Soviet War Memorial (Treptower Park) =

War memorial and military cemetery in Berlin, Germany

- Germany
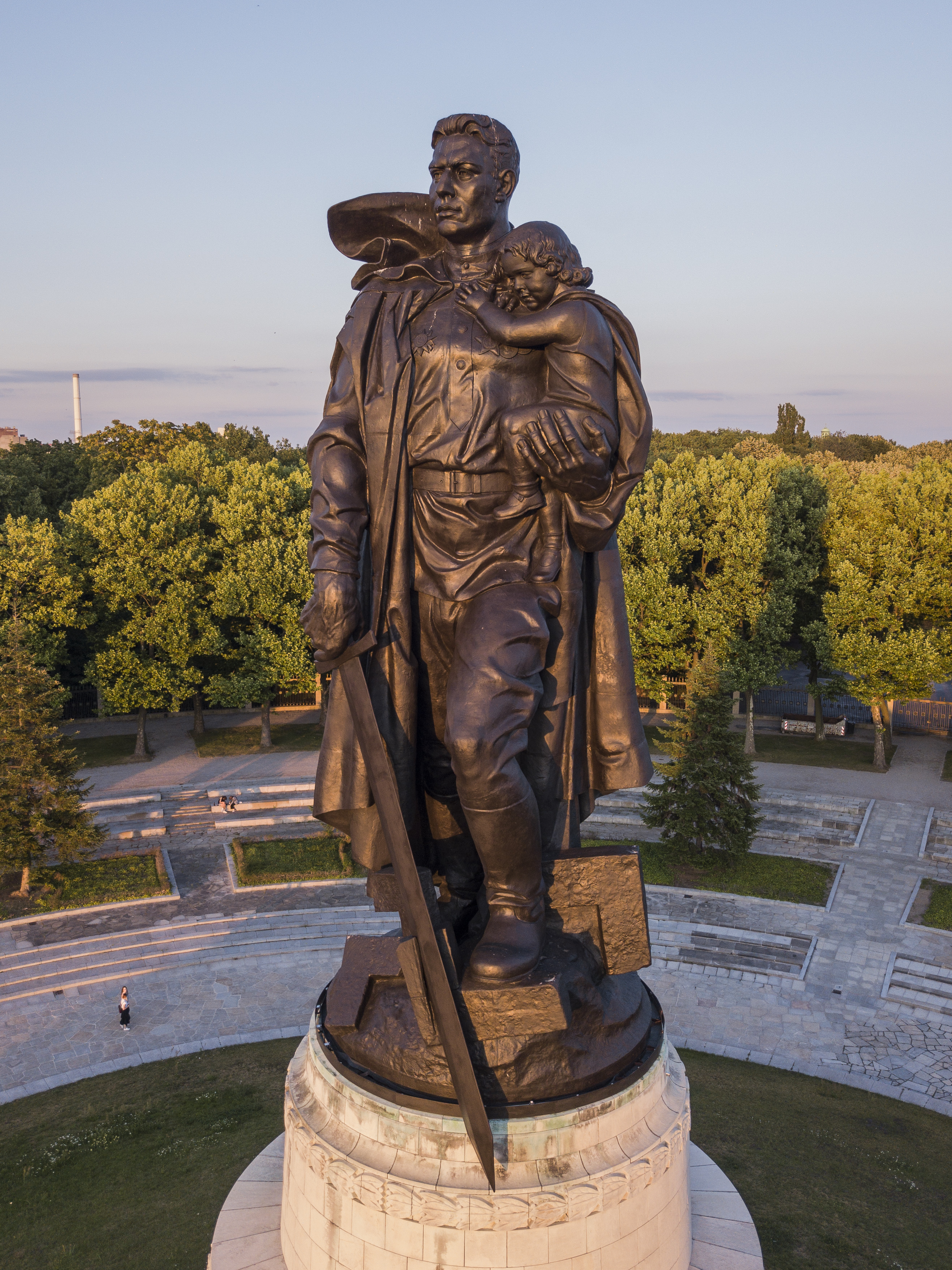
- Statue of Soviet soldier with a child depicted breaking a swastika with his sword
- For Soviet war dead of the Battle of Berlin
- Established: 8 May 1949
- Location: 52°29′15″N 13°28′06″E near Berlin
- Designed by: Yakov Belopolsky

The Soviet War Memorial (German: Sowjetisches Ehrenmal) is a war memorial and military cemetery in Berlin's Treptower Park. It was built to the design of the Soviet architect Yakov Belopolsky to commemorate 7,000 of the 80,000 Red Army soldiers who fell in the Battle of Berlin in April–May 1945. It opened four years after the end of World War II in Europe, on 8 May 1949. The Memorial served as the central war memorial of East Germany.

The monument is one of three Soviet memorials built in Berlin after the end of the war. The other two memorials are the Tiergarten memorial, built in 1945 in the Tiergarten district of what later became West Berlin, and the Schönholzer Heide Memorial in Berlin's Pankow district.

Together with the Rear-front Memorial in Magnitogorsk and The Motherland Calls in Volgograd, the monument is a part of a triptych.

== History ==
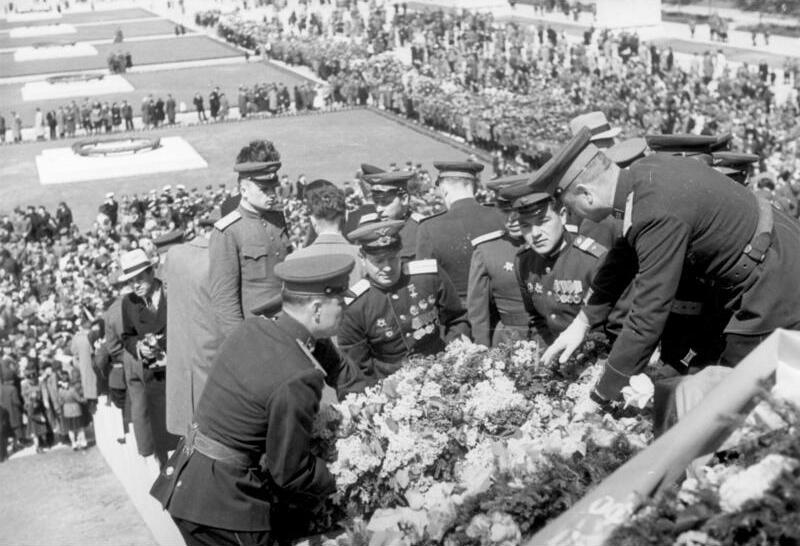
Inauguration in 1949

At the conclusion of World War II, three Soviet war memorials were built in the city of Berlin to commemorate Soviet deaths in World War II, especially the 80,000 that died during the Battle of Berlin. The memorials also serve as cemeteries for those killed.

A competition was announced shortly after the end of the war for the design of the park. The competition attracted 33 entries, with the eventual design a hybrid of the submissions of the architect Yakov Belopolski, sculptor Yevgeny Vuchetich, painter Alexander A. Gorpenko and engineer Sarra S. Walerius. The sculptures, reliefs, and flame bowls with a 2.5-metre (8 ft 2 in) diameter were cast at the Lauchhammer Kunstgießerei ('art foundry') in 1948. The memorial itself was built in Treptower Park on land previously occupied by a sports field. The memorial was completed in 1949. For over three years, some 1,200 workers, 200 stonemasons, and 90 sculptors worked on the complex.

It was rumored that the remains of the Reich Chancellery had been used for the construction of the memorial, but this was not the case.

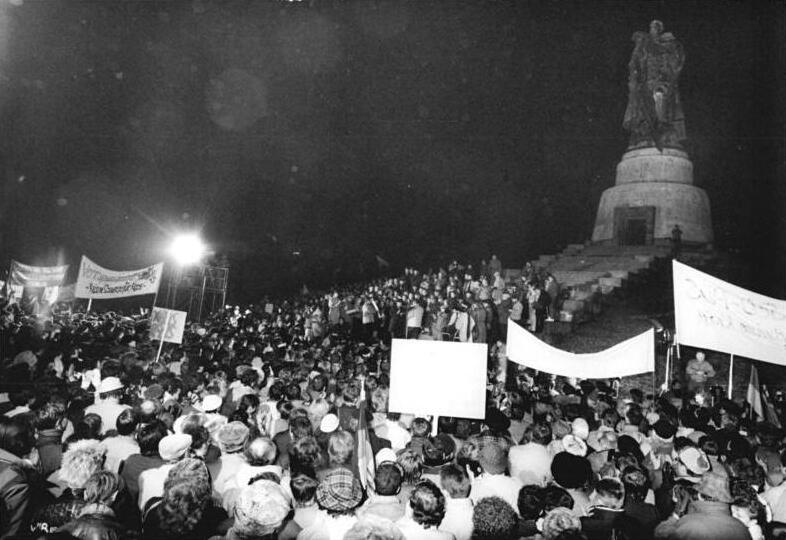
Protest-demonstration with around 250,000 East Berliners against "right-wing extremism", January 1990.

Around the time of the fall of the Berlin Wall, unknown persons vandalized parts of the memorial with anti-Soviet graffiti. The Spartakist-Arbeiterpartei Deutschlands claimed that the vandals were right-wing extremists and arranged a demonstration on 3 January 1990, which the PDS supported; 250,000 East German citizens participated. Through the demonstrations, the newly formed party stayed true to the communist roots of its founding party, and attempted to gain political influence.

The International Communist League spoke to the crowd, noting that "for the first time in 60 years" Trotskyists addressed a mass audience in a workers state. Participants and those listening on radio and TV heard two counterposed programs: that of the Stalinist SED, and that of the Trotskyist ICL". PDS chairman Gregor Gysi took this opportunity to call for a Verfassungsschutz ('constitution protection') for the GDR, and questioned whether the Amt für Nationale Sicherheit ('office for national security', the successor of the Stasi) should be reorganized or phased out. Historian Stefan Wolle believes that Stasi officers may have been behind the vandalism, since they feared for their jobs and needed a pretext, such as the threat of "fascists", to justify their continued oppression of the population.

As part of the Two Plus Four Agreement, Germany agreed to assume maintenance and repair responsibility for all war memorials in the country, including the Soviet memorial in Treptower Park. As part of the agreement, Germany must consult Russia before making any changes to the memorial.

== Layout ==
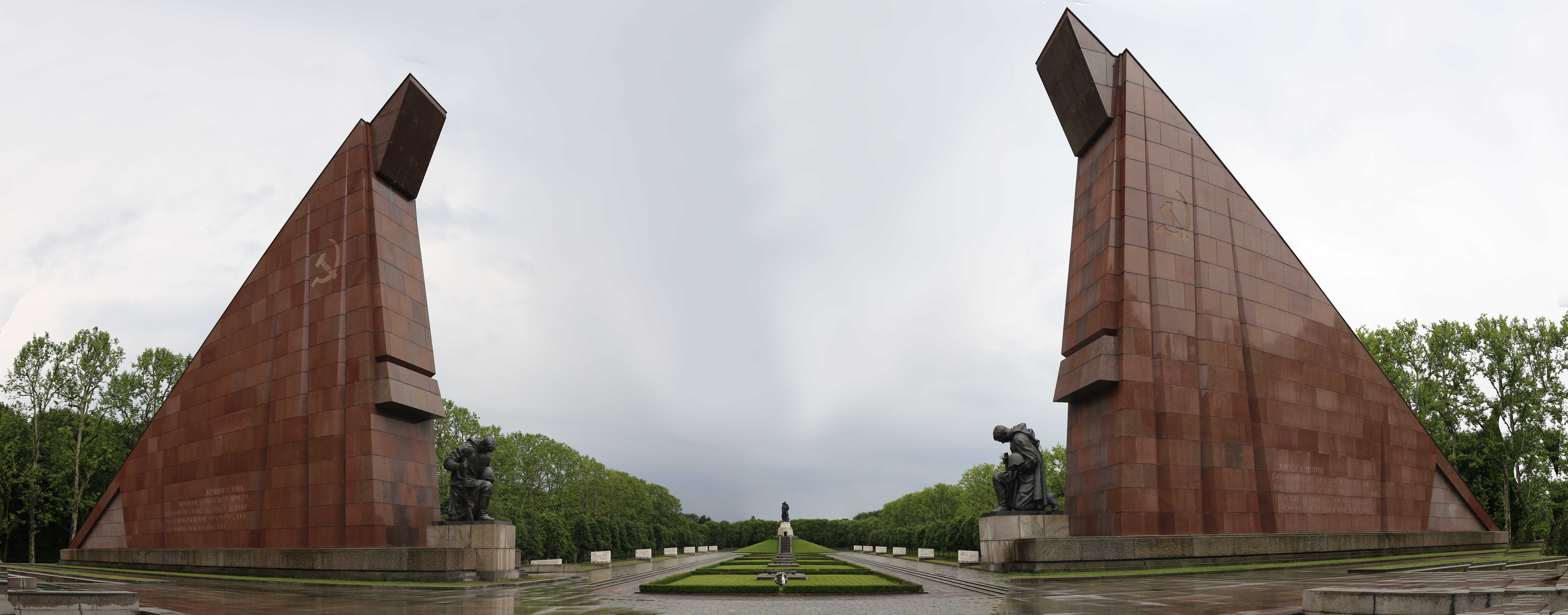
Panorama of the Soviet War Memorial at Treptow

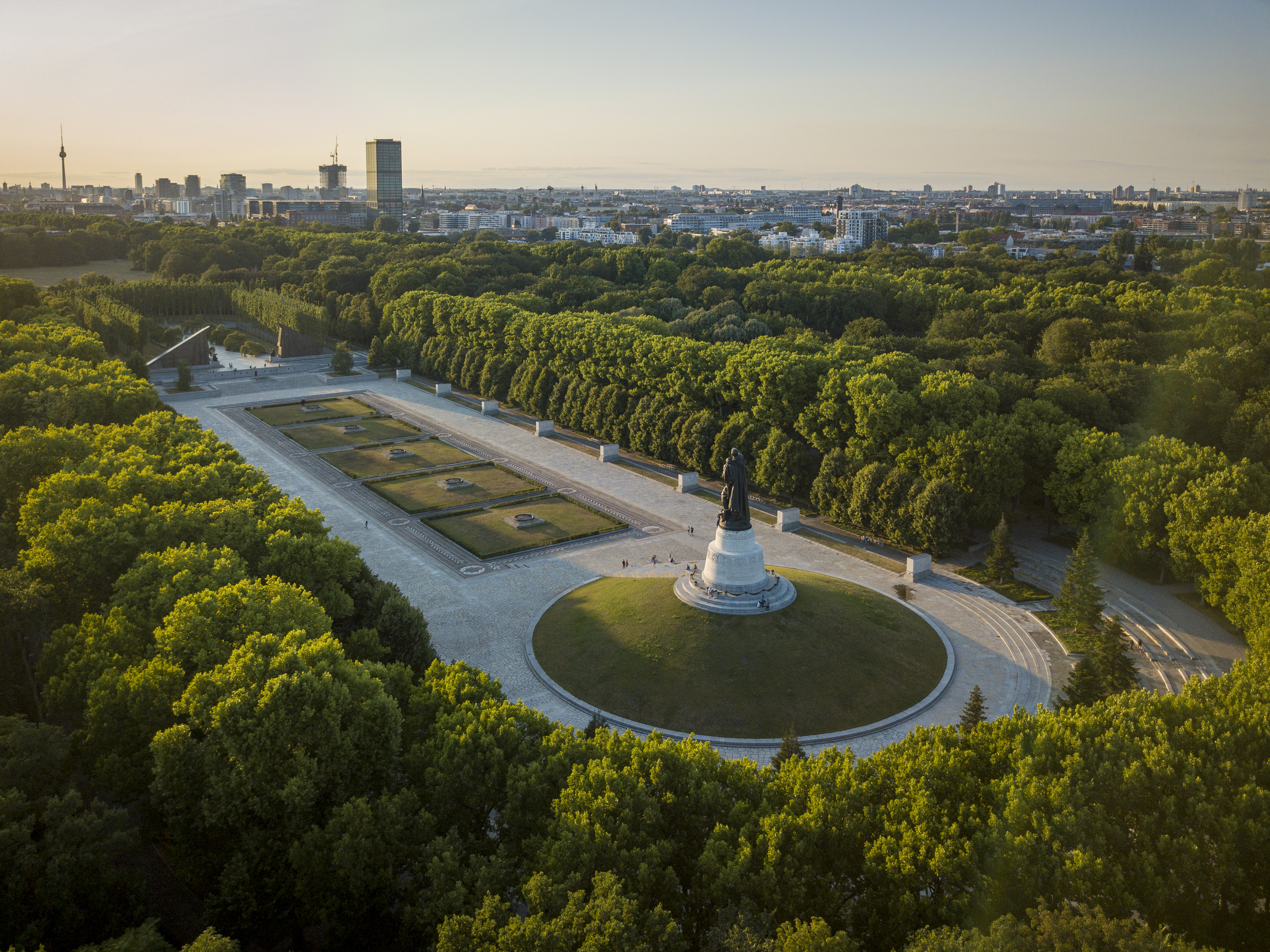
Overview of site in 2022

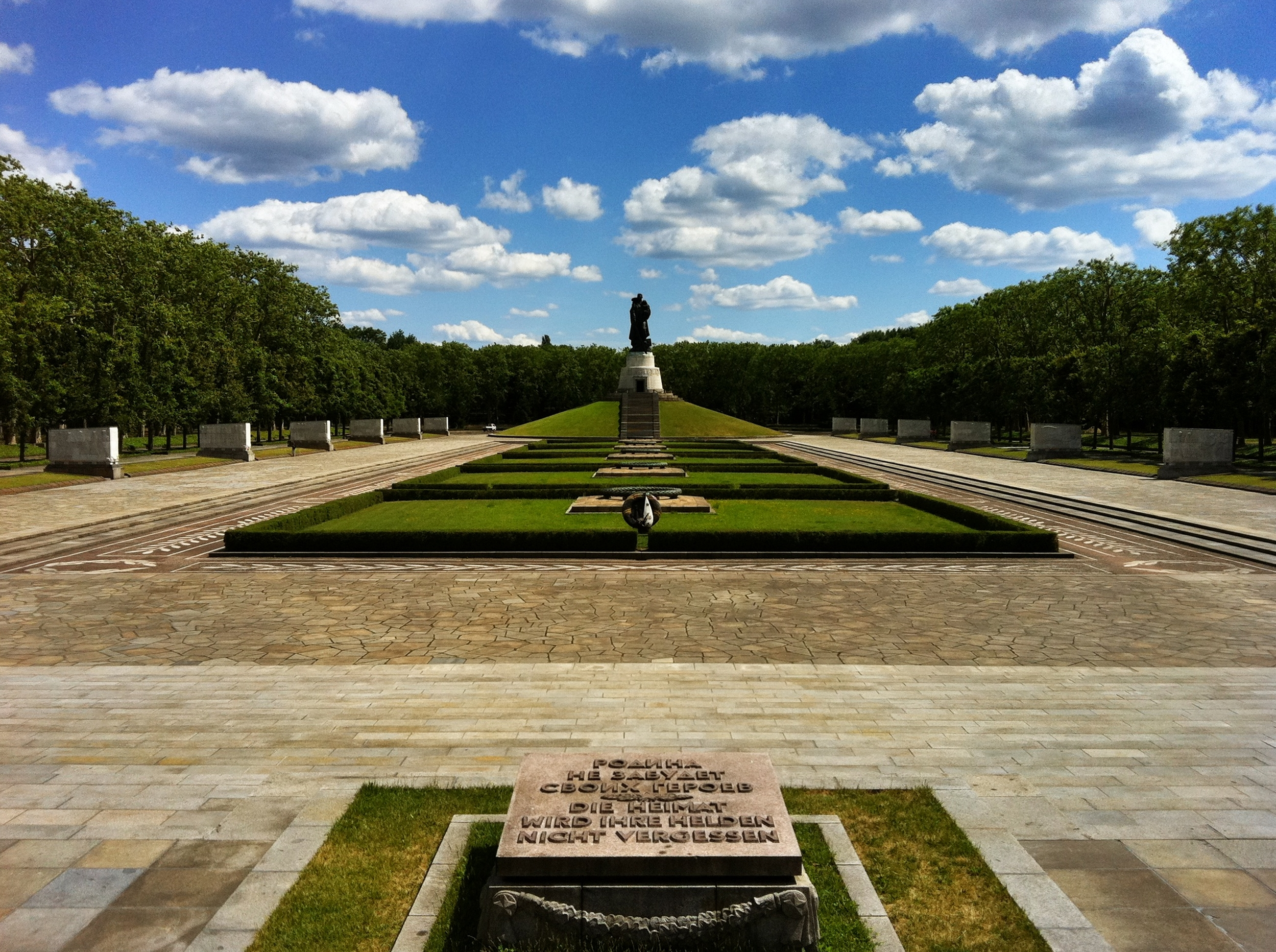
Main axis of memorial

The focus of the ensemble is a monument by Soviet sculptor Yevgeny Vuchetich: a 12-metre-tall (39 ft) bronze statue of a Soviet soldier with a sword holding a German child, standing over a broken swastika. According to Marshal of the Soviet Union Vasily Chuikov, the Vuchetich statue commemorates the deeds of Sergeant of Guards Nikolai Masalov, who during the final storm on the center of Berlin risked his life under heavy German machine-gun fire to rescue a three-year-old German girl whose mother had apparently disappeared.

Before the monument is a central area lined on both sides by 16 stone sarcophagi, one for each of the then 16 Soviet republics (Note: Between 1940–56 (up to the reorganization of the Karelo-Finnish SSR into the Karelian ASSR and its incorporation into the Russian SFSR) there were 16 union republics) with relief carvings of military scenes and quotations from Joseph Stalin, on one side in Russian, on the other side the same text in German: "Eternal glory to the combatants of the Soviet Army, who gave up their lives in the battle to free humanity from fascist enslavement". The area is the final resting place for some 5,000 soldiers of the Red Army.

At the opposite end of the central area from the statue is a portal consisting of a pair of stylized Soviet flags built of red granite. These are flanked by two statues of kneeling soldiers. Beyond the flag monuments is a further sculpture, along the axis formed by the soldier monument, the main area, and the flags, is another figure, of the motherland weeping at the loss of her sons.

== Commemorations ==
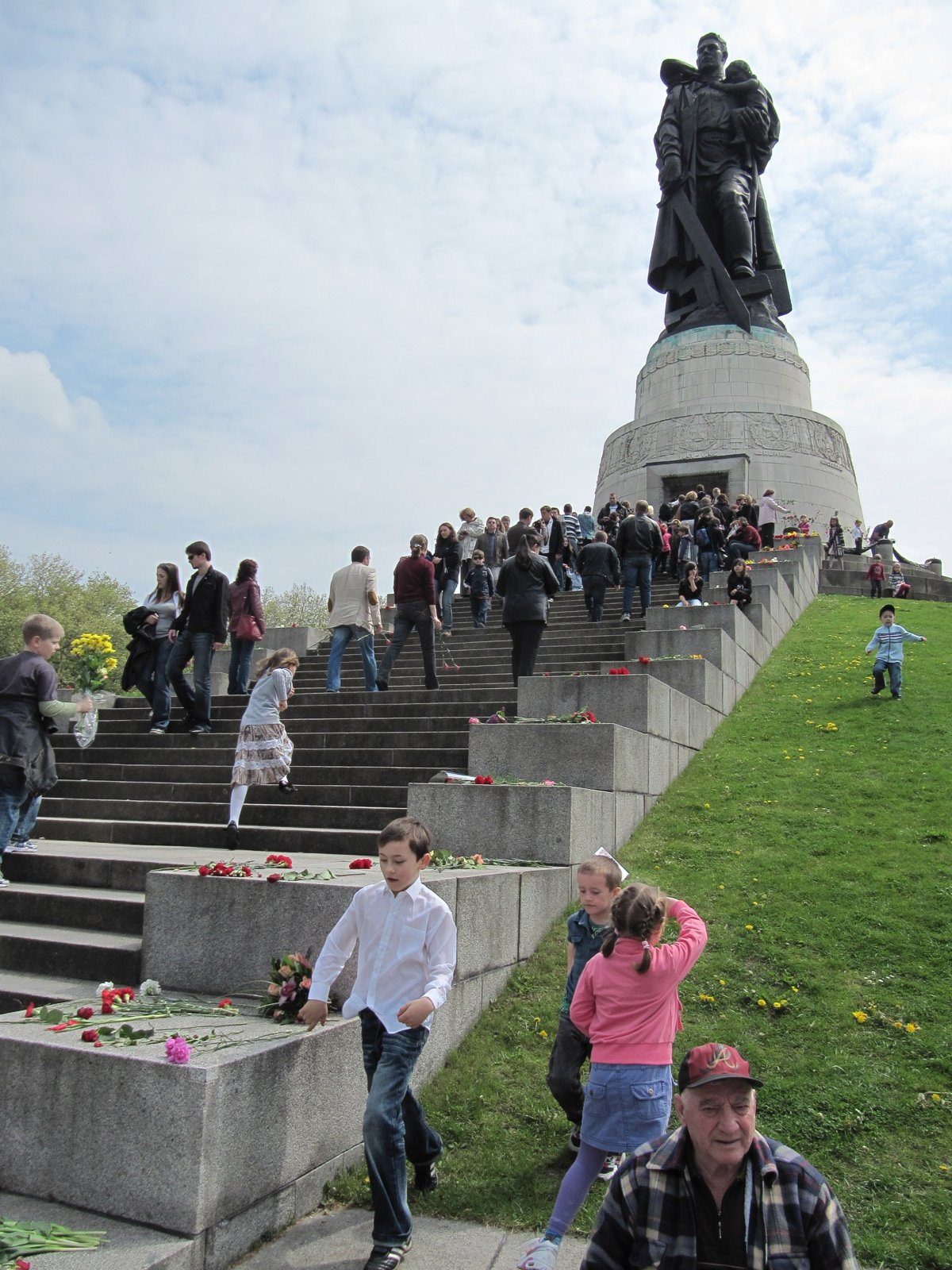
Visitors at the 65th Victory Day celebration laying flowers

Rallies and ceremonies are held on the memorial by local Berliners. On 31 August 1994, a memorial ceremony was attended by Helmut Kohl and Boris Yeltsin. In 2019, Russia's ambassador to Germany, a deputy of the Moscow City Duma, the Chairman of the Chamber of Deputies of Berlin and the head of the German People's Union for the Care of War Graves all took part in a ceremony marking the occasion of the centenary of the German War Graves Commission. Participants laid flowers at the monument to honour the memory of Soviet soldiers.

Since 1995, an annual vigil has taken place at the memorial on 9 May, organized by (among others) the Bund der Antifaschisten Treptow e.V (German for 'Anti-fascist Coalition of Treptow'). The motto of the event is the "Day of Freedom", corresponding to Victory Day, a Russian holiday and the final surrender of German soldiers at the end of World War II.

In 2003–2004, the memorial underwent a thorough renovation. The main statue was removed and sent by boat to a workshop on the island of Rügen for refurbishment, at a cost of approximately €1.5 million, equivalent to €1.95 million in 2021. On 4 May 2004, ahead of Victory in Europe Day celebrations on the 8th, the statue was returned to its position in the park, having been cleaned using water jets and glass beads, a patina restored and protective wax coating applied, had 2200 screws replaced, and an additional stainless steel structure added.

== Criticism ==
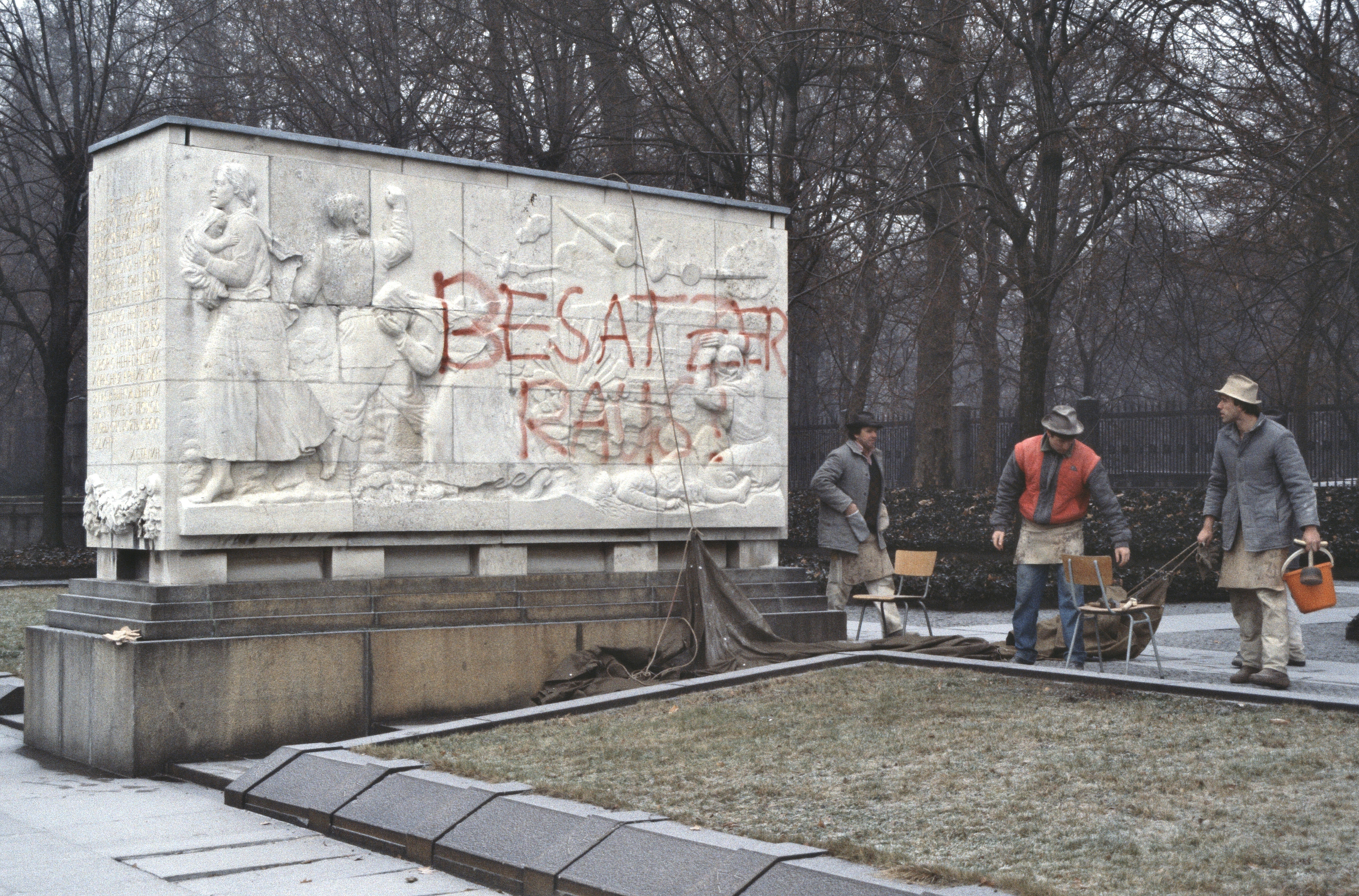
Anti-Soviet graffiti on the memorial, 28 December 1989

This monument has earned some unflattering nicknames, such as the "Tomb of the Unknown Rapist", from the local population with references to mass rapes committed by Soviet occupation troops.

In addition, the funds spent on restoring the statue in 2003–2004 attracted criticism, being contrasted with the lack of restitution paid to those who were abducted to the USSR during the war.

There have been discussions over demolition of the monument, like other Soviet propaganda monuments, with renewed discussion following the Russian invasion of Ukraine.

== In literature ==
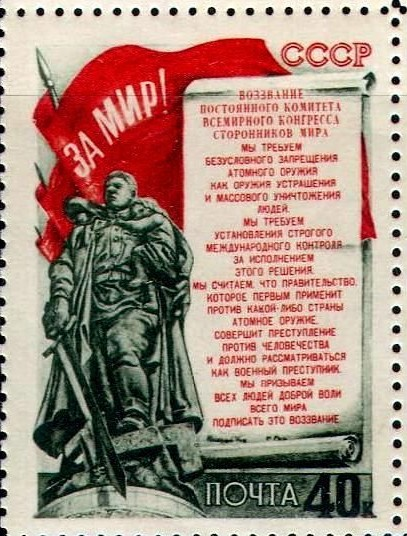
The statue depicted on a 1951 Soviet stamp, with the text of the Stockholm Appeal

The Soviet War Memorial is described in detail in M. M. Kaye's novel Death in Berlin, written in 1955 and based on Kaye's first-hand impression of the then freshly inaugurated monument. The protagonists – British officers stationed in Berlin and their wives and families – are far from well disposed towards the Soviets, but are still greatly impressed with what they see: "Below each flag, and at the top of the steps, was a statue of a kneeling Russian soldier, his bared head bent in homage statues, steps and the towering expanse of red marble dwarfing the stream of sightseers to pygmy proportions." One of Kaye's British characters makes the prediction – since then disproven by events – that the Soviet monument would be demolished "five minutes after the Russians move out of East Germany, whenever that is". He then adds that such a demolition would be a great pity, since the monument was "the equal of Karnak, Luxor and the Acropolis".

== See also ==
- Memorial to the Murdered Jews of Europe
