= The Motherland Calls =

Volgograd monumental sculpture

- Russia
- For the heroes of the Battle of Stalingrad
- Unveiled: 15 October 1967
- Location: 48°44′33″N 44°32′13″E; Mamayev Kurgan, Volgograd, Russia
- Designed by: Yevgeny Vuchetich, Yakov Belopolsky, Nikolai Nikitin

The Motherland Calls (Russian: Родина-мать зовёт!, romanised: Rodina-mat' zovyot!, lit. 'Mother Homeland calls!') is a colossal neoclassicist and socialist realist war memorial sculpture on Mamayev Kurgan in Volgograd, Russia. Designed primarily by sculptor Yevgeny Vuchetich with assistance from architect Yakov Belopolsky, the concrete sculpture commemorates the casualties of the Battle of Stalingrad, and is the predominant component of a monument complex, which includes several plazas and other sculptural works. Standing 85 metres (279 ft) tall from the base of its pedestal to its peak, the statue was the tallest in the world upon its completion in 1967, and is the tallest statue in Europe if including the pedestal. The statue, along with the rest of the complex, was dedicated on 15 October 1967, and has been listed as a tentative candidate for UNESCO's list of World Heritage Sites since 2014.

The sculpture depicts a female personification of Russia, commonly called "Mother Russia". She wears a windswept shawl resembling wings, and holds a sword aloft in her right hand. Her left hand is extended outward, as she calls upon the Soviet people to battle. The statue was originally planned to be made of granite and to stand only 30 metres (98 ft) tall, with a design consisting of a Red Army soldier genuflecting and placing a sword before Mother Russia holding a folded banner. However, the design was changed in 1961 to be a large concrete structure at nearly double the height, a decision criticised by Soviet military officials and writers. It was inspired by the Winged Victory of Samothrace, an ancient Greek sculpture of the goddess of victory, Nike.

Construction of The Motherland Calls began in 1963, and was led by structural engineer Nikolai Nikitin. The project faced numerous challenges, including the assembly of the statue's framework and its intricate features; these issues were further compounded by the statue's size. Delays were caused by cold weather and unforeseen geological issues, necessitating extensive foundation reinforcement and relocation of water systems. Additional complications arose with the statue's sword, which had to be redesigned due to problems with wind resistance. Despite these obstacles, the memorial was completed in 1967 for the 50th anniversary of the October Revolution.

After its dedication, the sculpture underwent numerous alterations and restoration attempts. In 1972, the statue's sword was replaced with a higher-grade steel alloy version to reduce wind resistance, and by 1986, the statue had tilted significantly from its original axis. Concerns about the statue's structural integrity arose by the early 21st century, with the statue in disrepair and at risk of collapsing. Comprehensive restoration efforts began later in the century, and by 2020, the monument had undergone extensive restoration, although post-renovation critiques and new structural issues have since arisen. The sculpture has been featured on various official Russian symbols, commemorative coins, stamps, and postcards.

== Background ==
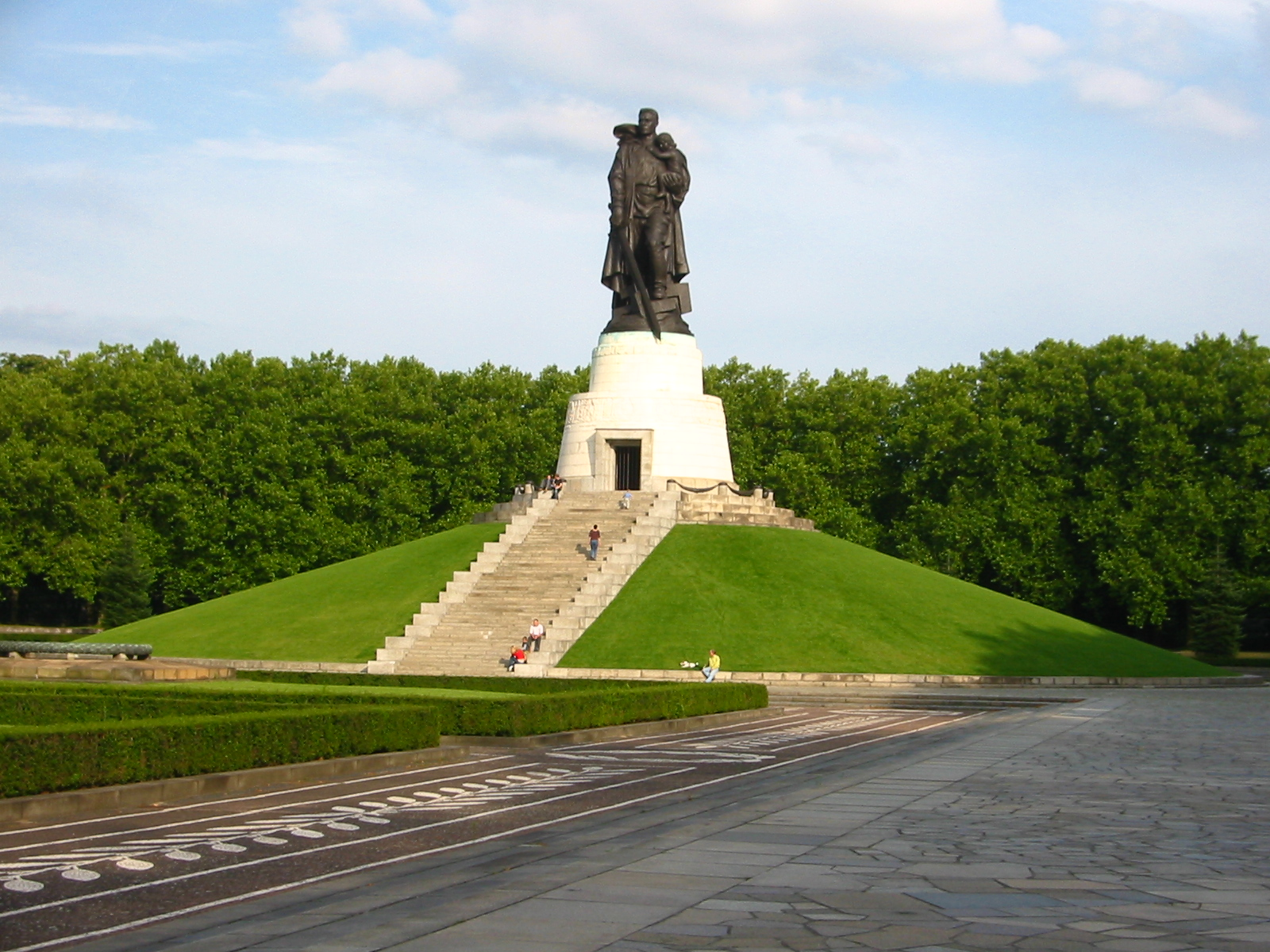
The Soviet War Memorial in Berlin's Treptower Park, designed by Yevgeny Vuchetich and Yakov Belopolsky

The Battle of Stalingrad was a major conflict between the Soviet Union and Nazi Germany on the Eastern Front of World War II, fought over six months from July 1942 to February 1943. The battle resulted in a decisive Soviet victory but came at a tremendous cost, with over a million estimated Soviet-suffered casualties. The battle was quickly mythologised in Soviet culture, and was widely referred to as the turning point in the war in Soviet history textbooks.

The idea of commemorating the Soviet victory in the Battle of Stalingrad originated in the final years of the war. Soviet politicians and artists had considered designs for monuments to the battle prior to the war's end, and the first Soviet museum commemorating World War II was established as early as March 1943. In 1944, the publication Arkhitektura SSSR issued a number of articles detailing possible designs for memorials. Following the end of the war in 1945, several small-scale obelisks and commemorative plaques were erected across the Soviet Union; however, larger plans for monuments were curtailed by leader Joseph Stalin, who sought to refocus attention on emerging Cold War conflicts, virtually prohibiting all public observation of the war by 1948.

In 1948, sculptor Yevgeny Vuchetich, a member of the Academy of Arts of the Soviet Union, began discussing plans for a monument for the Battle of Stalingrad with architect Yakov Belopolsky, with whom he had previously collaborated on the development of the Soviet War Memorial in Berlin's Treptower Park. The project was intended to be built atop Mamayev Kurgan, an ancient burial mound that was the site of intense conflict during the battle. Vuchetich started petitioning high-ranking Soviet officials for permission to design the monument in the early 1950s, including Politburo member Georgy Malenkov. In a letter to Malenkov dated December 1951, Vuchetich claimed that he had received multiple inquiries from veterans and family members of those who died in the war about the absence of a memorial on Mamayev Kurgan.

After Stalin's death in March 1953, plans for a memorial on Mamayev Kurgan were revitalised. In March 1954, the Council of Ministers announced a competition for the design of a "State Museum of the Defence of Tsaritsyn-Stalingrad", which would include a large panoramic painting depicting the battle; by this time, Vuchetich and Belopolsky had already finalised drafts for the project's structural designs. On 23 January 1958, the Council of Ministers declared that the construction of "a memorial-monument in the city of Stalingrad commemorating victory over the German fascist force" would be overseen by a committee led by Vuchetich and comprising Belopolsky and Anatoly Garpenko, an artist and Red Army veteran.

== Design and construction ==
=== Design and style ===
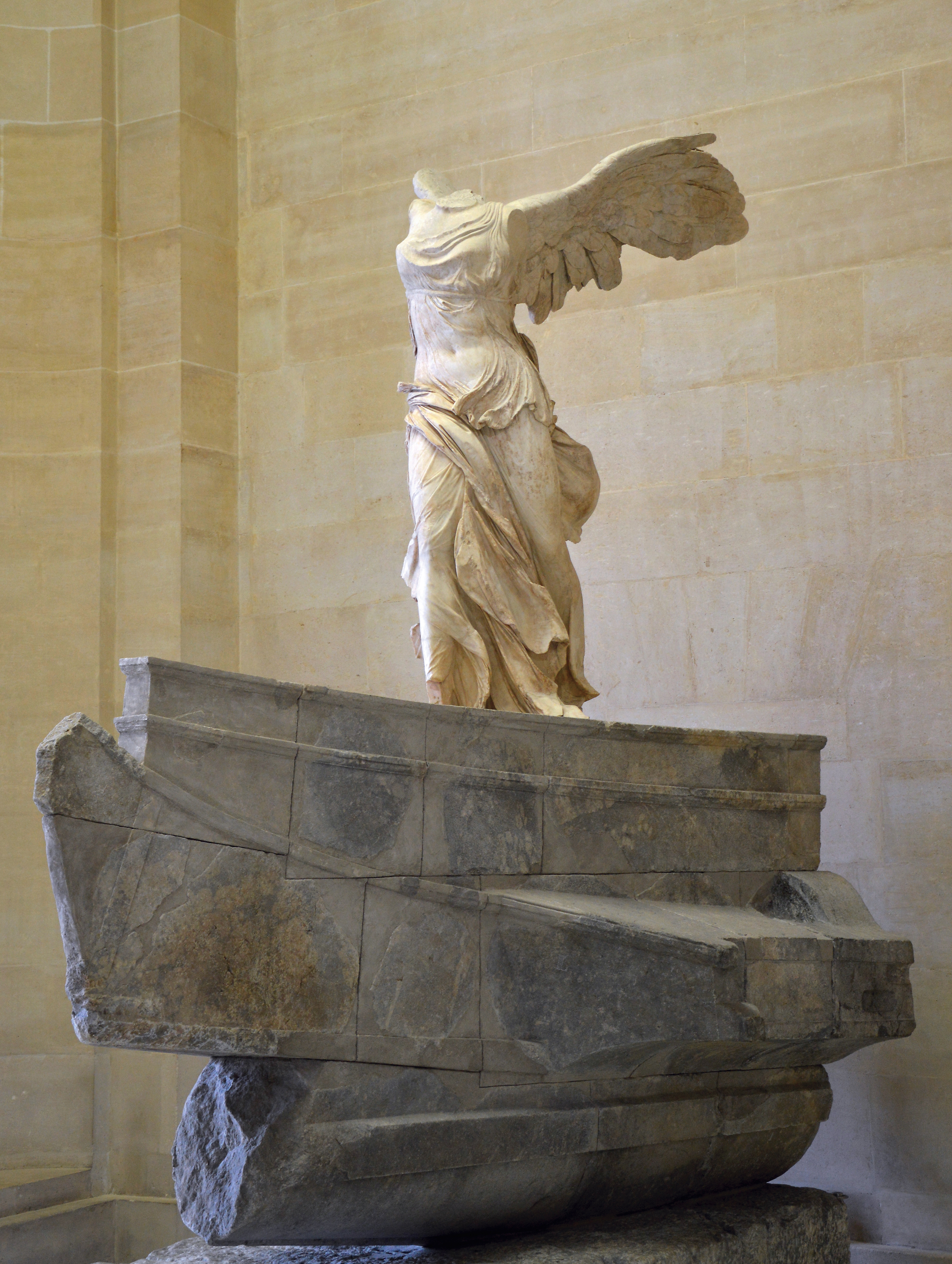
The Winged Victory of Samothrace served as inspiration for the final design of the sculpture.

Vuchetich and Belopolsky's initial designs for the project were ambitious and took much of their inspiration from the memorial at Treptower Park. The original plan for the monument featured a triumphal arch that led to a granite staircase, followed by a brick staircase in an avenue of Lombardy poplar trees. A second granite staircase led to a circular plaza, with a large granite statue of a Russian man titled Stand To the Death! Behind the statue, a final granite staircase led to a plaza with an entrance to an underground complex called the "Panorama". A cupola-shaped hall would include an eternal flame to memorialise the heroes of Stalingrad, a sculpture of a man shaping a sword into a ploughshare, and walls engraved with the names of those who died in the battle. An exit at the end of the hall led to a second observation platform with a panoramic painting depicting a prosperous post-war Stalingrad.

The principal component of the project was to be a colossal statue at the top of Mamayev Kurgan; at the statue's base, a foyer would be built to allow visitors to honour the dead with commemorative gifts. The statue was designed according to the principles of neoclassicism and socialist realism, both artistic styles in which Vuchetich specialised. The original plan for the sculpture was to have it constructed entirely of granite, with a design featuring a Red Army soldier genuflecting and placing a sword before a female personification of Russia, commonly referred to as Mother Russia, holding a folded banner; this was later changed to be a concrete statue of a lone Mother Russia wearing a windblown shawl resembling wings and holding a sword aloft in her right hand, with her left hand extended outward as she calls upon the Soviet people to fight against the enemy. The design was inspired by the Winged Victory of Samothrace, an ancient Greek sculpture of the goddess of victory, Nike.

Committee members initially suggested that the sculpture should be dressed in traditional Russian clothing. Vuchetich objected to the proposition, arguing that a traditional costume would diminish the idea of the battle as an international event and defy the neoclassical style he had envisioned for the statue. The sculpture was initially planned to be 30 metres (98 ft) tall from its pedestal to its peak; however, Soviet leader Nikita Khrushchev ordered it to be taller than the 46-metre (151 ft) tall Statue of Liberty in a display of dominance over the United States, their geopolitical rival during the Cold War. The height of the statue alone was increased to 52 metres (171 ft), nearly double the originally planned height, a decision that further increased the project's cost, which had already substantially overrun its budget. Vuchetich chose a 26-year-old waitress, Valentina Izotova, to be the model for the body of the statue, although he also drew inspiration from the physique of famous Soviet discus thrower Nina Dumbadze, while the face of the statue is believed to have been based on that of Vuchetich's wife, Vera Vladimirovna Vuchetich.

The choice to make The Motherland Calls the primary feature of the monument complex was met with derision from Soviet military officials, including generals Andrey Yeryomenko and Mikhail Shumilov, who believed the statue's design would detract from the importance of the Panorama, which they thought to be the only structure that could faithfully represent the extent of the soldiers' experiences. Vuchetich rationalised the decision by asserting the monument should reflect the widespread recognition of the Battle of Stalingrad as the turning point of the war, and marketed the project as one part of a sculptural triptych that would encompass the memorial at Treptower Park and a planned monument in Moscow. The planned sculpture also attracted criticism from Soviet writers, including Viktor Nekrasov, who claimed the monument would defile the historic site.

=== Construction ===
While construction on the rest of the monument complex began in 1961, work on The Motherland Calls did not start until late 1962. Vuchetich's final design for the sculpture was approved by the artist committee in December 1962, and on 23 January 1963 the Council of Ministers ordered the development of blueprints for the statue. The process of building of the monument would prove to be more complicated than anticipated by its developers, primarily due to its size and the complexity of its details. After the Sculptural Group of the Artistic Fund requested to be relieved of their construction duties and the construction firm Volgogradgidrostroi expressed reservations about taking over the project, structural engineer Nikolai Nikitin was appointed to lead the construction efforts.

In 1963, Nikitin's design team began planning the construction process for the monument, finalising their designs by August. Nikitin began his role as head of the team by emphasising unresolved issues, specifically the lack of geological and hydrological studies that had been recommended earlier in the year. In a report to the Ministry of Culture made in September, he insisted these studies were crucial due to the extensive construction already completed and the need to ensure the foundation's durability and stability, particularly given the presence of mellite clays on Mamayev Kurgan; the hill could only support the structure if the moisture of its soil remained low. Nikitin noted that the foundation, initially designed for a statue half the height, required an investigation to confirm its suitability. Almost immediately following his report, the Ministry sent a team to Volgograd to thoroughly investigate the issues.

Construction on The Motherland Calls commenced in November 1963. The statue, made entirely of reinforced concrete, used a special hydrostatic cement mixture that had been developed for the construction of the Ostankino Tower in Moscow. The statue's structure featured an internal framework of vertical and horizontal diaphragms forming cells that were 3 metres (9.8 ft) wide, 3 metres deep, and 4 metres (13 ft) tall, extending from its 2-metre (6.6 ft) pedestal to its neck. The external surface was a reinforced concrete membrane varying in thickness from 25 to 60 centimetres (9.8 to 23.6 in). Construction involved pouring concrete in 50-centimetre (20 in) increments into the forms shaping the vertical diaphragms, allowing each layer to harden before proceeding. Workers used small vibrators to settle the concrete, eliminate air pockets, and ensure even pours, working manually due to the tight spaces.

Each 4-metre-high section was capped with a horizontal diaphragm, serving as the foundation for the next section. The statue's head, arms, and scarf were cast separately and attached using cantilevered junctions and large steel bolts, with the metal sword anchored in the right hand. Its stability was ensured by a complex system of steel tension cables to counteract wind forces, monitored by seismographic and meteorological instruments inside the structure. A radio transmitter was installed in the statue's head to transmit data on ground vibrations, surface temperatures, and humidity. Passageways within the statue were built to allow for interior inspections, while the exterior would be visually examined.

==== Work and completion ====
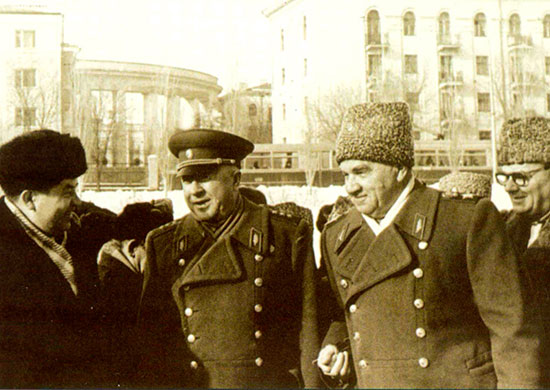
Yevgeny Vuchetich meeting with veterans of the Battle of Stalingrad in Volgograd in 1967. From left to right: Hero of the Soviet Union Yakov Pavlov, Colonel General Aleksandr Rodimtsev, Marshal of the Soviet Union Vasily Chuikov, and Vuchetich.

Initially, crews focused on assembling the metal framework designed to support the internal diaphragms, followed by welding the rebar for the external membrane and creating the plaster moulds for the statue's surface. The concrete pedestal was poured, and by the end of 1963, the shawl pieces and the empty hand had been made and attached to the framework. However, the arrival of subfreezing temperatures halted further concrete pouring, which could not resume until the spring; plans were set to complete this phase of the construction by 1 July 1965. The statue's head and sword hand were then mounted, with the metal sword set to be installed later. During this period, the construction of other components of the memorial, such as the "Wall Ruins" and parts of the "Square of Heroes", progressed significantly.

Despite initial forecasts for a November 1965 opening, the construction timeline was extended into the late summer of 1966. This delay was partly due to emerging issues with the sculpture's foundation and the stability of the surrounding soil, prompting geological investigations that uncovered several critical deficiencies in the initial surveys. For instance, examinations of Mamayev Kurgan's substrata were only carried out to a depth of 9 metres (30 ft), rather than the necessary depth of at least 46 metres (151 ft). Additionally, there had been no measurement of the soil's compression under the statue's weight, nor was there any consideration of how the expansion of waterlogged clay could impact the foundation. No comprehensive assessment was made of potential groundwater sources, and no tests to evaluate the stability of the mound's slope were conducted.

Addressing these issues required significant effort and expense; in early 1966, officials concluded that the only solution involved relocating all water supply pipes and reservoirs buried within the mound to a distance of at least 273 metres (896 ft) from the statue's base to improve drainage around the structure. The statue's foundation was reinforced, and several thousand cubic metres of extra earth were backfilled to create a levee around the pedestal. However, these adjustments necessitated the removal of several graves previously located at the hill's summit and a reduction in the size of the plaza where the Grief of the Motherland statue and the Pantheon, which had replaced the Panorama due to issues with the latter's foundation, were situated. These remedial efforts continued into 1967.

In May 1966, crews hoisted and secured the 14-ton, 28-metre-long (92 ft) sword into the statue's right hand. The sword was constructed from stainless steel and bolstered by plates made from titanium. However, by late August, strong winds revealed that the sword and its anchoring structure were subjected to lateral forces that had not been accurately accounted for. The sword's tip was observed wavering by nearly 1 foot (0.30 m) in either direction, posing a risk to the integrity of the joint connecting the arm to the metal framework. This movement resulted in visible cracks in the concrete surface around the area. A committee was formed to investigate further, who concluded that the existing sword needed replacement; temporary measures were applied, included cutting holes in the current sword and reinforcing the joint until a permanent fix could be implemented.

In February 1967, the Council of Ministers mandated that all remaining work on the memorial complex be completed by 15 October for the 50th anniversary of the October Revolution. Labourers worked throughout the spring and summer to meet this deadline, completing the earthen levee surrounding the main monument's pedestal, relocating the remaining leaking irrigation pipes and reservoirs, reinforcing the sword, installing sound and lighting systems across the complex, and setting in place the final sculptural and landscaping elements. The last major obstacle arose from complications with the Pantheon; as crews applied the mosaics to the Pantheon's interior walls in early 1967, they discovered inconsistencies in the glass tiles. With only four months until the scheduled opening, Vuchetich urgently sought intervention from officials to expedite a solution. Supplementary glass was quickly produced and delivered, and several hundred soldiers from a local garrison were enlisted to aid in construction. The crews worked diligently, completing the Pantheon's mosaic walls in under a month for the complex's opening. Once finished, the full sculpture stood 85 metres (279 ft) tall from the base of the pedestal to the top of the sword, and was the tallest statue in the world upon its completion; it remains the tallest statue in Europe as of 2024.

=== Dedication ===
The dedication of the memorial occurred on 15 October 1967. The event drew tens of thousands of people to Mamayev Kurgan, along with reporters from official press outlets, including Izvestia and Pravda, who wrote extensively on the memorial's scale and significance, describing the statue as a tribute to the heroism of Stalingrad's defenders. Vuchetich, along with the engineers and construction workers, were lauded for their contributions to the project, with reporters drawing parallels between their efforts and those of the soldiers who defended the city.

The opening ceremony featured speeches from party leaders and military representatives, who highlighted various themes such as the valour of those who fought in the battle, the importance of remembering past sacrifices, and the role of the Red Army in defeating fascism. Premier Leonid Brezhnev's keynote address framed the monument as a testament to Soviet unity and postwar recovery, while also emphasising the USSR's commitment to peace and culture in contrast to American actions during the Vietnam War. The speeches collectively stressed the significance of the memorial in preserving the memory of the war and its heroes, and praised the Soviet people's enduring loyalty to the Communist Party and its Central Committee.

== Post-dedication ==
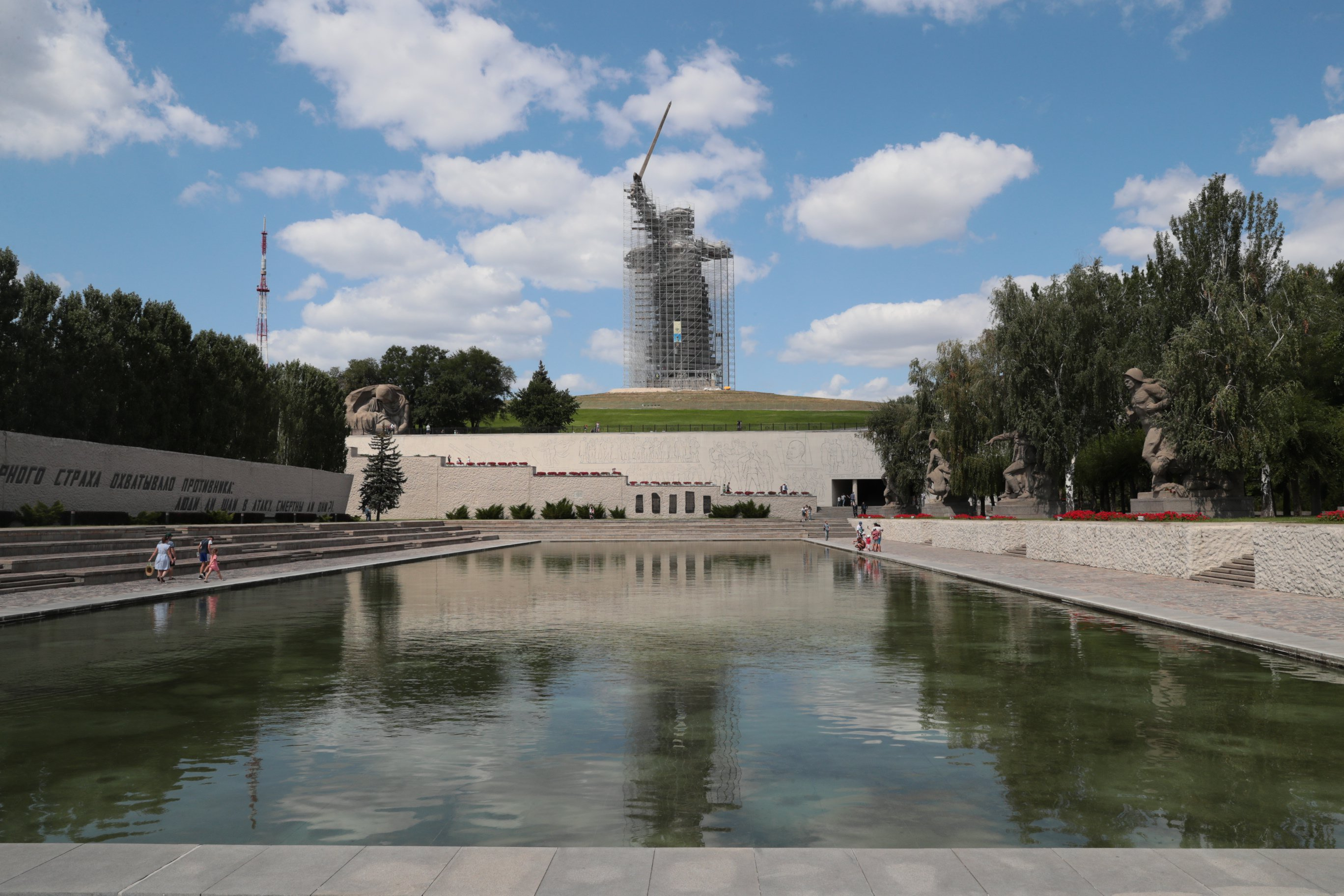
The Motherland Calls under renovation in August 2019

The years after the statue's dedication were primarily marked by alterations and several attempts at restoration. A year after the monument's opening, cracks had already started to form on the statue's surface. To preserve the monument, the head and hands of the sculpture were treated with a waterproofing agent once a year. In 1972, the statue's sword was replaced with a higher-grade steel alloy version featuring jalousie-like slits to reduce wind resistance. The sculpture's surface received a maintenance inspection in 1986; by this time, it had tilted 60 millimetres (2.4 in) from its original vertical axis since its initial assessment in 1966.

Between 2008 and 2009, a comprehensive safety and reliability program for the statue was developed and approved by the Russian Ministry of Culture. However, by 2009, concerns had been raised about its structural integrity; the statue's foundation was not anchored but held in place by its own weight, and was subsiding as a result of rising water levels. By this time, pieces of concrete had already begun to fall off the statue, nearly injuring passersby, and it had tilted approximately 20 centimetres (7.9 in), with further tilting risking collapse. Estimated costs to repair the structural issues were over US$7 million (equivalent to $9,918,248 in 2024); however, efforts to secure funding for restoration were complicated by the Great Recession, and previous attempts to allocate government funds for restoration had been undermined by misappropriation. Large-scale restoration work on the sculpture funded by the federal budget began in 2010. Initial steps included replacing the piezometric network (a system for measuring pressure) to allow for hydrogeological monitoring, studying the reinforced concrete's condition, and analysing cracks and other defects.

In 2014, the sculpture, along with the surrounding complex, was listed as a tentative candidate for UNESCO's list of World Heritage Sites. Following the 70th anniversary of the Soviet victory in World War II in 2015, the statue was set to undergo further renovation, with 99 of its 117 steel cables requiring replacement. By 2017, the cables had not yet been replaced, though plans were made to address the replacement along with other maintenance needs, with additional restoration efforts set to be conducted after the end of the 2018 FIFA World Cup, which was held in Russia. In late 2018, the construction company Glavzarubezhstroy completed preparations for the external restoration of the sculpture, which included creating access for special equipment, fencing off the area for material storage and worker camps, installing a two-metre fence around the sculpture, removing the lawn, setting up external lighting for the duration of the work, and digging trenches around the statue's base.

In early 2019, the observation deck at the foot of the statue was closed off to visitors until March of the following year to allow for additional restoration work to its pedestal, surface, and framework. In May, the sculpture had begun to be covered in scaffolding, and the granite slabs at the pedestal were removed. Restoration on the external features of the monument continued from July to November, including cracks being filled in and the surface being painted with white lead. In November, the scaffolding and the pedestal's slabs were removed, with internal renovations to be finished before Victory Day on 9 May 2020, the 75th anniversary of the end of the battle. The restoration of the monument was completed in March 2020; however, due to the COVID-19 pandemic, the reopening ceremony that had originally been planned for Victory Day was postponed. A virtual tour of the structure and the surrounding complex was made available online in lieu of public visitations.

The monument complex was reopened on 24 June 2020, with a ceremony hosted by Volgograd governor Andrey Bocharov and Russian Minister of Culture Olga Lyubimova. In total, the cost of renovating the sculpture alone cost approximately 750 million roubles (equivalent to $11,596,337 USD in 2024). In August, Russian designer Artemy Lebedev criticised the statue's post-renovation appearance, arguing that the statue was in a worse condition than it had been before its restoration; his comments received criticism from residents of Volgograd, who insisted that he be punished for insulting the memory of those who died in the Battle of Stalingrad.

By early 2021, dark spots and more cracks were noticed on the surface of the statue, prompting the filing of an application with a Moscow arbitration court requesting for Glavzarubezhstroy, which had not fulfilled its warranty obligations, to declare bankruptcy. Glavzarubezhstroy later filed for bankruptcy, was sued by the Battle of Stalingrad Museum-Reserve, and listed on a national registry of "unscrupulous suppliers". In a poll conducted by Bloknot Volgograd in March, a majority of Volgograd residents surveyed responded negatively to the question of whether the sculpture looked better after its restoration, with some calling on those who worked on the project to "restore it themselves, with their own money". An assessment of the reliability and safety of the structure was planned to be conducted in 2023. As of 2024, the dark spots on the statue were still noticeable.

=== Incidents ===
In 2017, a supporter of Russian opposition leader Alexei Navalny was accused of desecrating a Russian military symbol after publishing an edited image of the sculpture with its face and one of its hands recoloured green, mimicking Navalny's appearance after he was targeted by a zelyonka attack. Navalny was later blamed for the incident during a trial in February 2021. In the wake of the Russian invasion of Ukraine in 2022, a video game developer company in Belarus removed the statue from its game after receiving criticism from users on Twitter. United States senator Ted Cruz was criticised for featuring the sculpture on the cover of his book Justice Corrupted: How the Left Weaponized Our Legal System.

In February 2024, Bashkir activist Rasul Akhiyaretdinov faced criticism from pro-Russian online circles after he petitioned on social media for Vladimir Putin to order that the statue be redesigned; Akhiyaretdinov argued that the statue did not comply with Islamic and Eastern Orthodox dress standards due to the depiction of the statue's nipples. A criminal investigation against Akhiyaretdinov was initiated on 10 May 2024 following orders from investigative committee chairman Alexander Bastrykin. On 5 April 2024, a 23-year-old woman from Samara was sentenced to ten months of forced labour for "rehabilitating Nazism" after posting a video to Instagram in which she pretended to tickle the breasts of the statue.

In 2024, the grandson of Yevgeny Vuchetich inherited the rights to the monument's image and royalties, raising concerns among Volgograd residents about potential fees for using images of the monument on photographs, souvenirs, and banners. A representative for Vuchetich's grandson clarified that personal use of the monument's image, such as taking and sharing photographs online, would remain free. However, commercial use, including placing the image on merchandise or using it for profit, would require permission and could incur royalties ranging from several hundred to tens of thousands of roubles for each use, subject to how and where the statue was depicted.

In May 2025, Nikolai Chesnokov, the chancellor of the State Academy of Physical Education in Moscow, died inside the head of the memorial.

== Depictions ==
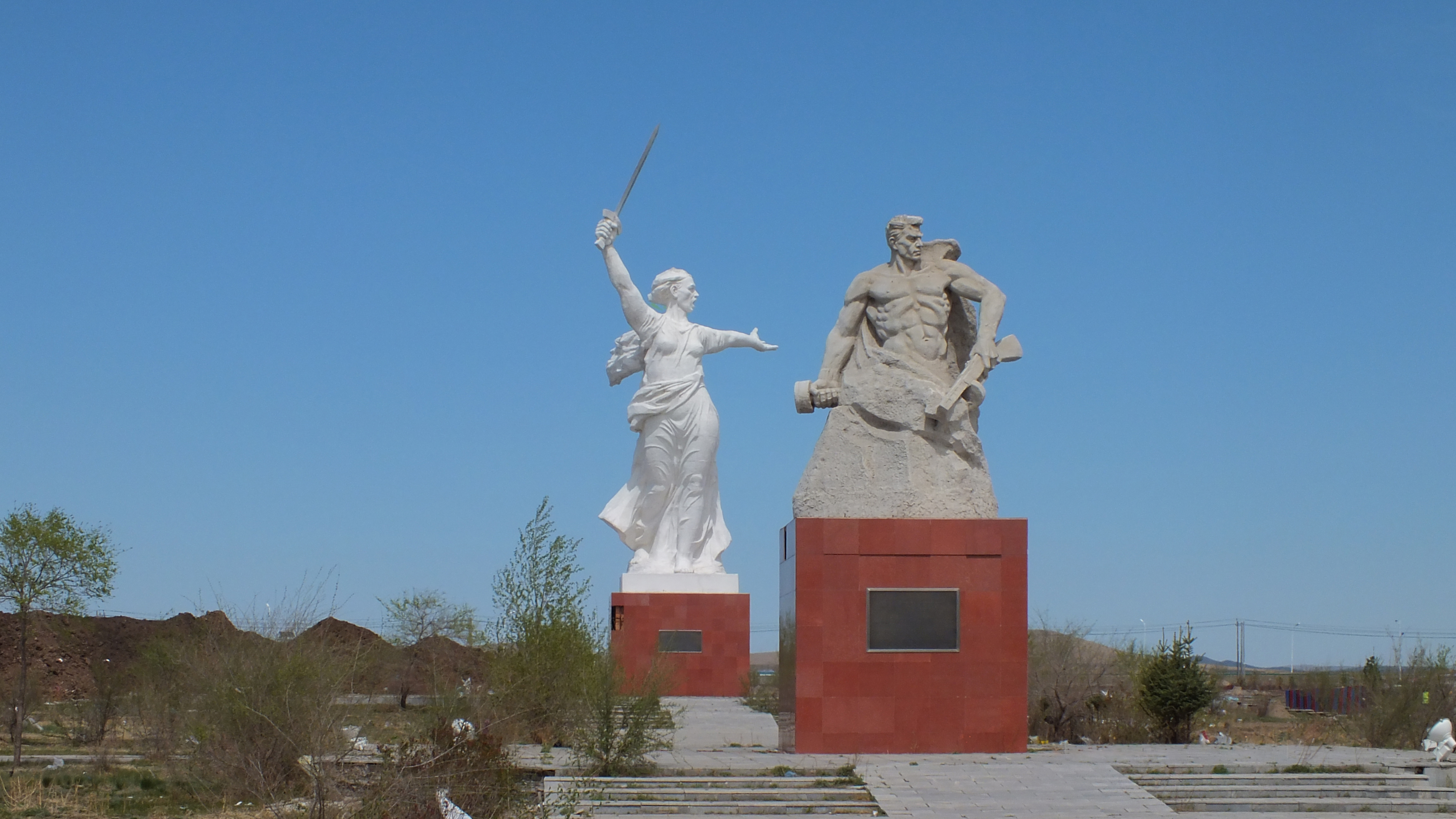
A replica of the monument in Manzhouli, China

The Motherland Calls is featured on the coat of arms and flag of Volgograd Oblast. Postage stamps and postcards depicting the sculpture were issued in the Soviet Union for the 20th anniversary of the founding of the International Federation of Resistance Fighters in 1971 and the 30th anniversary of the Battle of Stalingrad in 1973; a postcard with the statue was issued in Russia to commemorate the 60th anniversary of the battle in 2002. The sculpture also appears on a commemorative 100-rouble coin issued by the Central Bank of Russia in 2013, and a 3-rouble coin issued in 2015. There is a replica of the statue in the city of Manzhouli in Inner Mongolia, China, near the border between Russia and China.

Coat of arms of the Volgograd Oblast

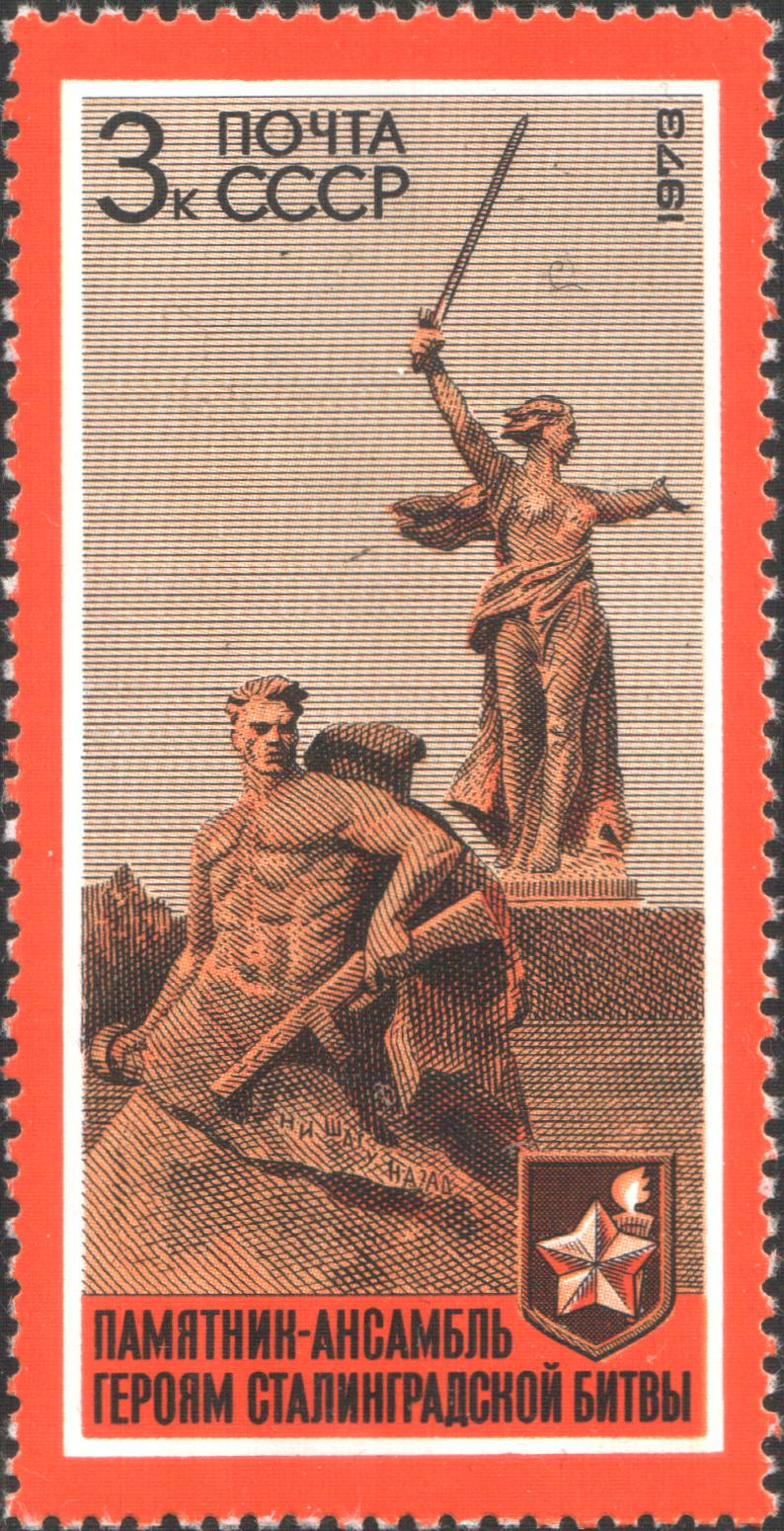
Soviet stamp commemorating the 30th anniversary of the Battle of Stalingrad, 1973

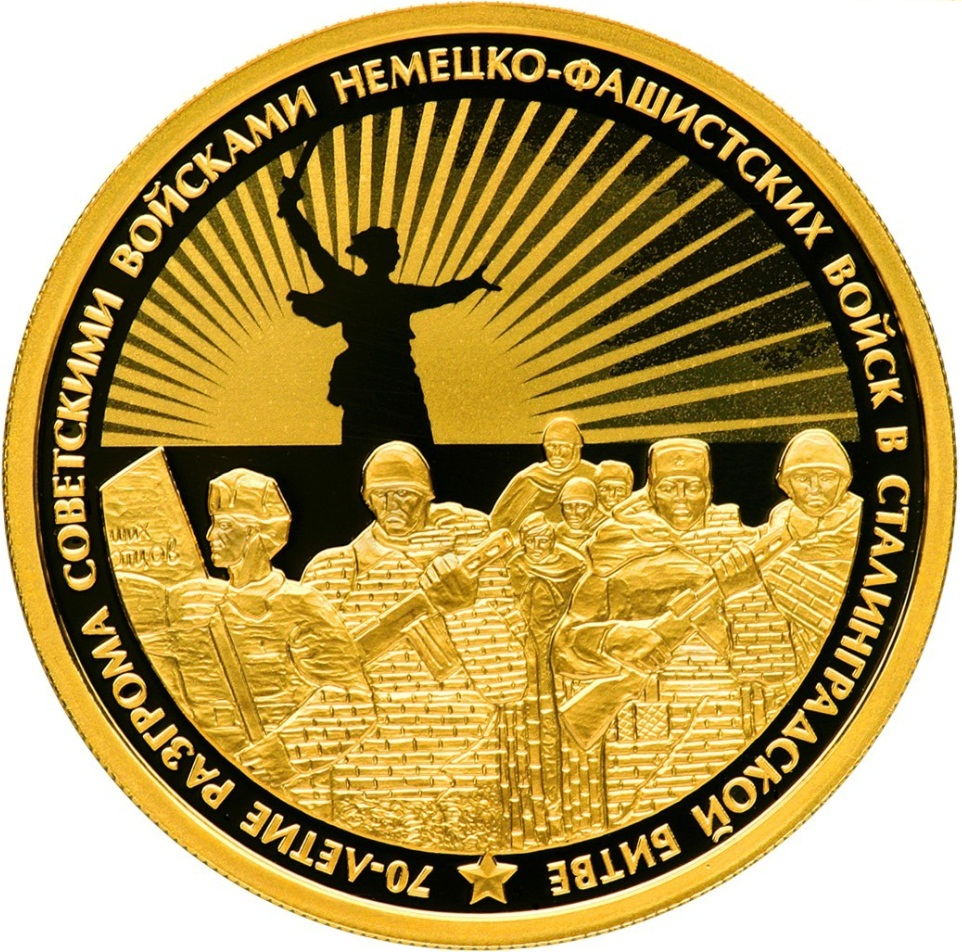
Commemorative 100-rouble coin issued by the Central Bank of Russia, 2013

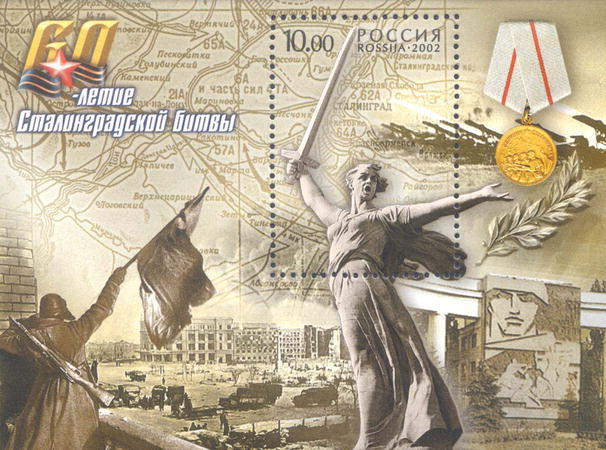
Russian postcard commemorating the 60th anniversary of the battle, 2002

== See also ==
- List of tallest statues
- Mother Ukraine, a similar sculpture in Kyiv that was partially designed by Yevgeny Vuchetich

Records
Preceded by Leshan Giant Buddha; 71 m (233 ft)	World's tallest statue 1967–1989	Succeeded by Dai Kannon of Kita no Miyako park 88 m (289 ft)
