= Flag of Volgograd Oblast =

Volgograd Oblast
- Proportion: 2:3
- Adopted: 31 August 2000
- Design: Red field with two vertical stripes at the hoist, charged with the statue The Motherland Calls.
- Designed by: Y.M. Kurasov and A.V. Shvets

The flag of Volgograd Oblast, a federal subject of Russia, was adopted in June 2000. The flag is a field of red (representing the courage and blood of those who fought for Russia and the oblast) with two blue vertical stripes (representing Volga and the Don rivers) at the hoist, and charged with an illustration of the statue The Motherland Calls. The ratio of the flag is 2:3.

== Other flags ==
Flag	Date	Use	Description
	1999–present	Flag of Volgograd city	Red background with the coat of arms on the middle
	2008–present	Flag of Frolovo	
	?–present	Flag of Kamyshin	
	2009–present	Flag of Mikhaylovka	
	2020–present	Flag of Uryupinsk	
	2006–present	Flag of Volzhsky	
	2003–2006	Flag of Volzhsky	
	2001–present	Flag of Alexeyevsky District	
	2009–present	Flag of Bykovsky District	
	2007–present	Flag of Chernyshkovsky District	
	2020–present	Flag of Danilovsky District	
	2007–present	Flag of Dubovsky District	
	?–present	Flag of Frolovsky District	
	2012–present	Flag of Gorodishchensky District	
	2002–2012	Flag of Gorodishchensky District	
	2002–2012	Flag of Gorodishchensky District, reverse	
	?–present	Flag of Ilovlinsky District	
	2008–present	Flag of Kalachyovsky District	
	2007–present	Flag of Kamyshinsky District	
	2020–present	Flag of Kikvidzensky District	
	2002–2020	Flag of Kikvidzensky District	
	2020–present	Flag of Kletsky District	
	2007–present	Flag of Kotelnikovsky District	
	2019–present	Flag of Kotovsky District	
	2005–present	Flag of Kumylzhensky District	
	2005–present	Flag of Leninsky District	
	?–present	Flag of Nekhayevsky District	
	?–present	Flag of Nikolayevsky District	
	2006–present	Flag of Novonikolayevsky District	
	?–present	Flag of Pallasovsky District	
	2005–present	Flag of Rudnyansky District	
	2016–present	Flag of Serafimovichsky District	
	2010–present	Flag of Sredneakhtubinsky District	
	2003–2010	Flag of Sredneakhtubinsky District	
	2002–present	Flag of Staropoltavsky District	
	?–present	Flag of Surovikinsky District	
	2000–present	Flag of Svetloyarsky District	
	2008–present	Flag of Uryupinsky District	
	2012–present	Flag of Yelansky District	
	2007–present	Flag of Zhirnovsky District	
	?–2007	Flag of Zhirnovsky District	
