= Yevgeny Vuchetich =

Soviet sculptor and artist (1908–1974)

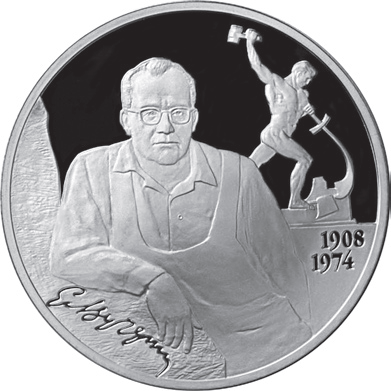
- Vuchetich on a 2008 Russian ruble
- Born: Yevgeny Viktorovich Vuchetich; December 1908; Yekaterinoslav, Yekaterinoslav Governorate, Russian Empire (now in Ukraine)
- Died: April 12, 1974 (aged 65)
- Notable work: The Motherland Calls

Yevgeny Viktorovich Vuchetich (Russian: Евгений Викторович Вучетич; 28 December [O.S. 15 December] 1908–12 April 1974) was a Soviet sculptor and artist. He is known for his heroic monuments, often of allegoric style, including The Motherland Calls, the largest sculpture in the world at the time.

== Biography ==
Vuchetich on a 1978 commemorative Soviet envelope

Vuchetich was born in Yekaterinoslav, Yekaterinoslav Governorate, Russian Empire (now Dnipro, Ukraine), the son of Viktor Vuchetich (Vučetić), a Montenegrin Serb (Grbalj) immigrant, and Anna Andreevna Stewart, of Russian and of French descent.

He was a prominent representative of the Socialist Realism style and was awarded with the Lenin Prize in 1970, the Stalin Prize first degree (1947, 1950), the Stalin Prize second degree (1946, 1948, 1949), Order of Lenin (twice), Order of the Patriotic War second degree Hero of Socialist Labor (1967) and People's Artist of the USSR (1959).

=== Family ===
One of his step-granddaughters is Israeli politician Ksenia Svetlova.

== Works ==
- Soviet War Memorial in Treptower Park, Berlin (1946–1949), overseen by a 13m tall monument of a Soviet soldier holding a German child, with a sword, over a broken swastika. This war memorial design was later used on coins and medals commemorating the end of fascist rule in 1945. Stalin Prize of first degree (1950)
- Nikolai Vatutin monument in Kyiv, Ukraine (1948). This monument was dismantled on 9 February 2023.
- Let Us Beat Swords into Plowshares in the United Nations gardens, New York City (1957)
- Let Us Beat Swords into Plowshares in front of the plant "Gazoapparat" in Volgograd.
- A sculpture of Felix Dzerzhinsky (1958), colloquially known as "Iron Felix", used to be in Moscow at the Lubyanka Square.
- The Motherland Calls! at Mamayev Kurgan (1963–1967). Lenin Prize (1970).
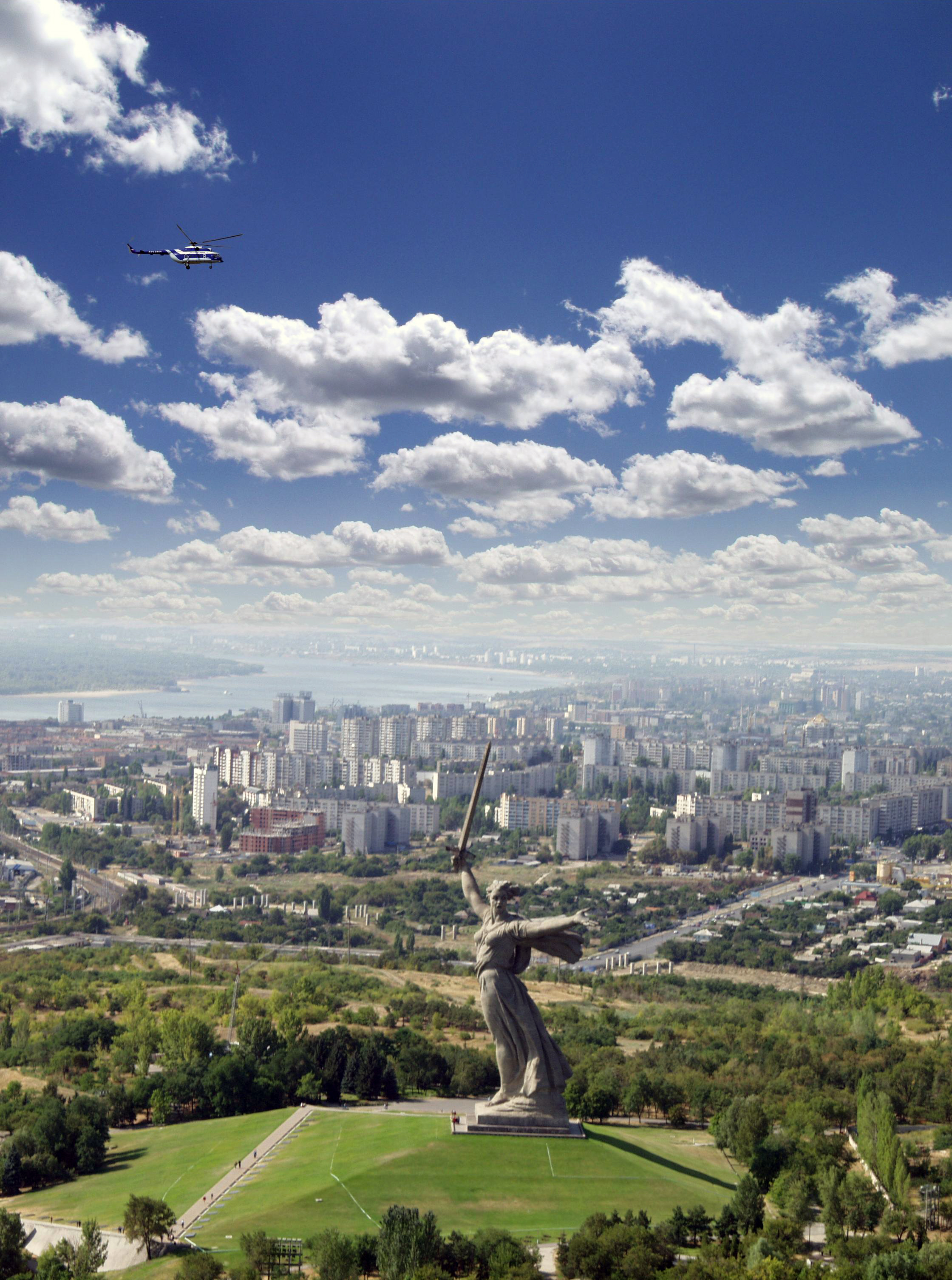
The Motherland Calls

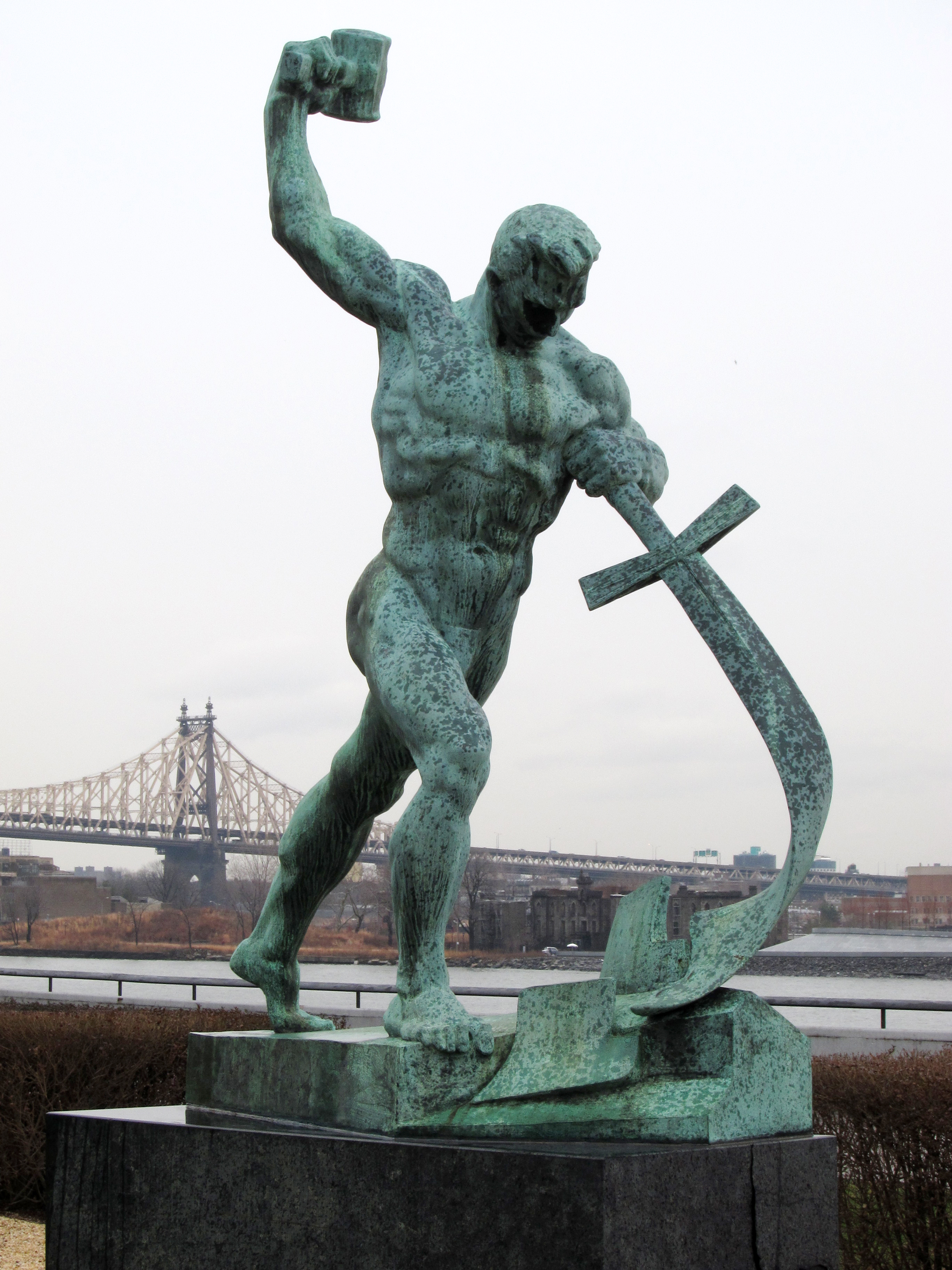
Let Us Beat Swords into Plowshares

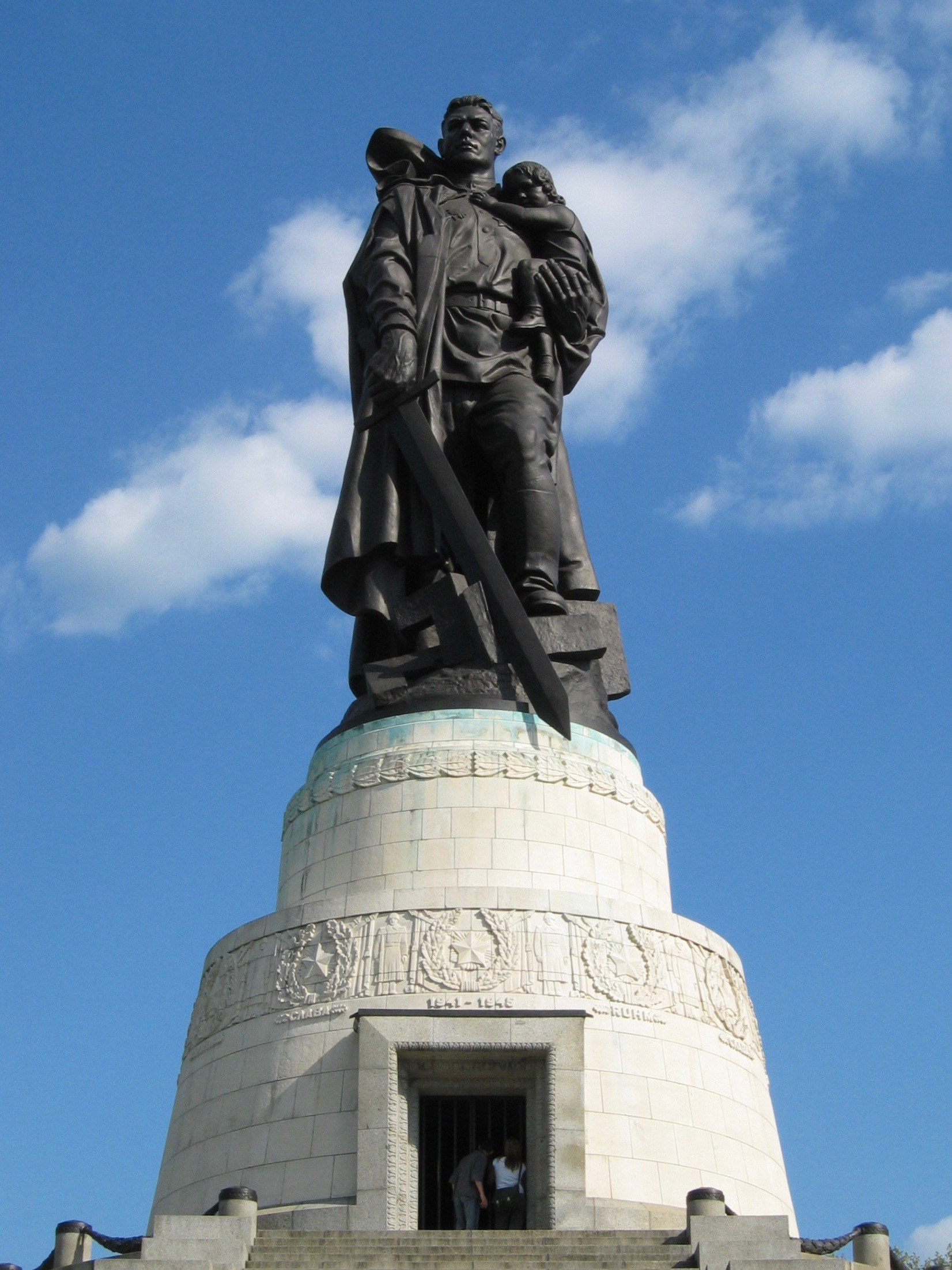
Soviet War Memorial in Treptower Park

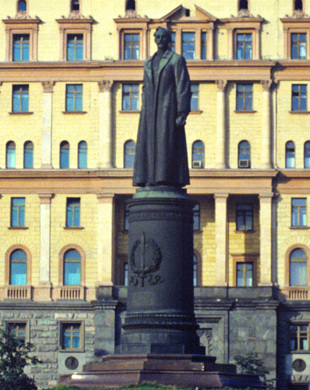
Monument to Felix Dzerzhinsky

== Awards ==
- Hero of Socialist Labour (10 October 1967)
- Peoples Artist of the RSFSR (1951)
- Honored worker of art of the Kazakh SSR (1957)
- Peoples Artist of the USSR
- Stalin prize 2nd class (1946)
- Stalin prize 1st class (1947)
- Stalin prize 2nd class (1948)
- Stalin prize 2nd class (1949)
- Stalin prize 1st class (1950)
- Two Order of Lenin (19 September 1952 and 15 October 1967)

== See also ==
- List of Russian artists
