= Mamayev Kurgan =

Historical place, hill in Russia

Coordinates: 48°44′33″N 44°32′13″E

Mamayev Kurgan with The Motherland Calls

Mamayev Kurgan (Russian: Мама́ев курга́н) is a hill and memorial complex overlooking the city of Volgograd (formerly Stalingrad) in Southern Russia. The name in Russian means "tumulus of Mamai". The formation is dominated by a memorial complex commemorating the Battle of Stalingrad (July 1942 to February 1943). The battle, a hard-fought Soviet victory over Axis forces on the Eastern Front of World War II, turned into the bloodiest battle in human history. At the time of its installation in 1967 the statue, named The Motherland Calls, formed the largest free-standing sculpture in the world.

== Battle ==
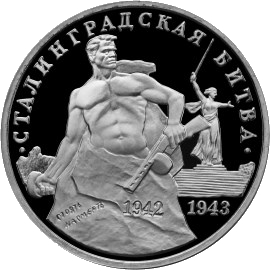
Commemorative coin

When forces of the German Sixth Army launched their attack against the city centre of Stalingrad on 13 September 1942, Mamayev Kurgan (appearing in military maps as "Height 102.0") saw particularly fierce fighting between the German attackers and the defending soldiers of the Soviet 62nd Army. Control of the hill became vitally important, as it offered control over the city. To defend it, the Soviets had built strong defensive lines on the slopes of the hill, composed of trenches, barbed-wire and minefields. The Germans pushed forward against the hill, taking heavy casualties. When they finally captured the hill, they started firing on the city centre, as well as on the city's main railway station under the hill. They captured the Volgograd railway station on 14 September 1942.

On the same day, the Soviet 13th Guards Rifle Division commanded by Alexander Rodimtsev arrived in the city from the east side of the river Volga under heavy German artillery fire. The division's 10,000 men immediately rushed into the battle. On 16 September, they recaptured Mamayev Kurgan and kept fighting for the railway station, taking heavy losses. By the following day, almost all of them had died. The Soviets kept reinforcing their units in the city as fast as they could. The Germans assaulted up to twelve times a day, and the Soviets would respond with fierce counter-attacks.

The hill changed hands several times. By September 27, the Germans again captured half of Mamayev Kurgan. The Soviets held their own positions on the slopes of the hill, as the 284th Rifle Division defended the key stronghold. The defenders held out until January 26, 1943, when the counterattacking Soviet forces relieved them. The battle of the city ended one week later with an utter German defeat.

When the battle ended, the soil on the hill had been so thoroughly churned by shellfire and mixed with metal fragments that it contained between 500 and 1,250 splinters of metal per square meter. The earth on the hill had remained black in the winter, as the snow kept melting in the many fires and explosions. In the following spring, the hill would still remain black, as no grass grew on its scorched soil. The hill's formerly steep slopes had become flattened in months of intense shelling and bombardment. Even today, it is possible to find fragments of bone and metal still buried deep throughout the hill.

== Memorial Complex ==
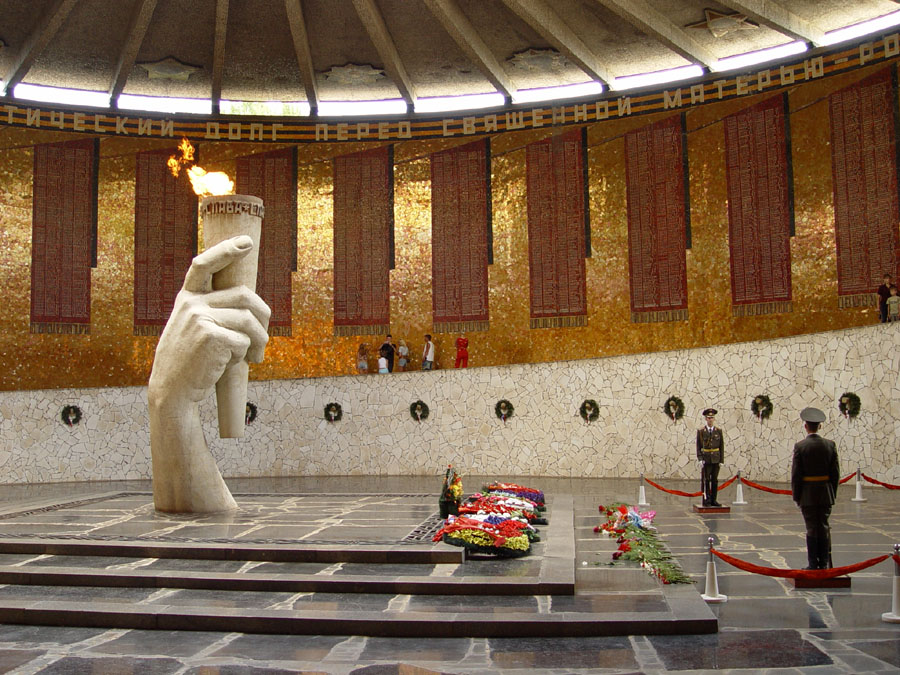
Eternal Flame

After the war, the Soviet authorities commissioned the enormous Mamayev Kurgan memorial complex. Vasily Chuikov, who led Soviet forces at Stalingrad, lies buried at Mamayev Kurgan; this makes him the only Marshal of the Soviet Union to be buried outside Moscow. 34,505 soldiers who were defenders of Stalingrad are buried there; sniper Vasily Zaytsev was also reburied there, in 2006.

=== Avenue of Poplars; Stand To the Death! ===
Mamayev Kurgan is accessible by a flight of stairs leading to the Avenue of Poplars, flanked on either side by poplar trees. From there, a second flight of steps leads to the statue of a muscular and shirtless Russian soldier. This statue, named Stand To the Death!, is carved from rock and surrounded by a large pool of water; it bears the inscription ... And not a step back!

=== Symbolic Ruined Walls; Square of Heroes ===
From Stand To the Death!, a third flight of stairs leads between the Symbolic Ruined Walls; these represent the ruins of Stalingrad, while immortalizing the Soviet heroes who defended the city. Carved into the walls are faces of numerous soldiers, their eyes closed to indicate death in battle. Also inscribed on the walls are numerous quotes from actual defenders of Stalingrad; these words were originally carved, by the soldiers themselves, upon the sides of various ruined buildings throughout the city.

Atop the steps, past the walls, is the Square of Heroes; this is dominated by another large pool of water. On one side of the pool is a wall bearing this inscription taken from an article by Vasily Grossman: With an iron wind blowing straight into their faces, they were still marching forward; and fear seized the enemy. Were these people who were attacking? Were they even mortal at all? On the other side of the pool are six sculptures, the first of which bears the inscription: "We've stood out and defeated death." The second and third sculptures commemorate military nurses and, respectively, sea soldiers. The fourth sculpture is dedicated to the officers who led the battle to protect Stalingrad. The fifth sculpture tells the story of "Saving the Banner". The sixth sculpture commemorates the eventual triumph of the Russian army over the Germans.

=== Hall of Military Glory ===
Past the Square of Heroes is the Hall of Military Glory, whose outer façade is decorated with Russian artwork of Soviet soldiers celebrating the war's end...and with the inscription "Our people will keep alive their memory of the greatest battle in the history of warfare, within the walls of Stalingrad."

An indoor flight of stairs leads to the Hall's circular main chamber; at the chamber's center is the Eternal Flame, a large sculpture of a hand holding a torch. The Eternal Flame is constantly under armed guard, which is changed every hour. The main chamber is considered sacred ground, with mournful music being played on a loop; out of respect, visitors are strongly discouraged from speaking aloud. The chamber's walls are covered in glass-foil mosaics; these bear the names of 7,200 Russian soldiers who died in the battle for Stalingrad. Around the ceiling of the chamber is the following inscription from an article by Vasily Grossman: "...Yes, we were mere mortals, and few of us survived, but we all fulfilled our patriotic duty to our sacred Motherland!"

=== Mother's Sorrow ===
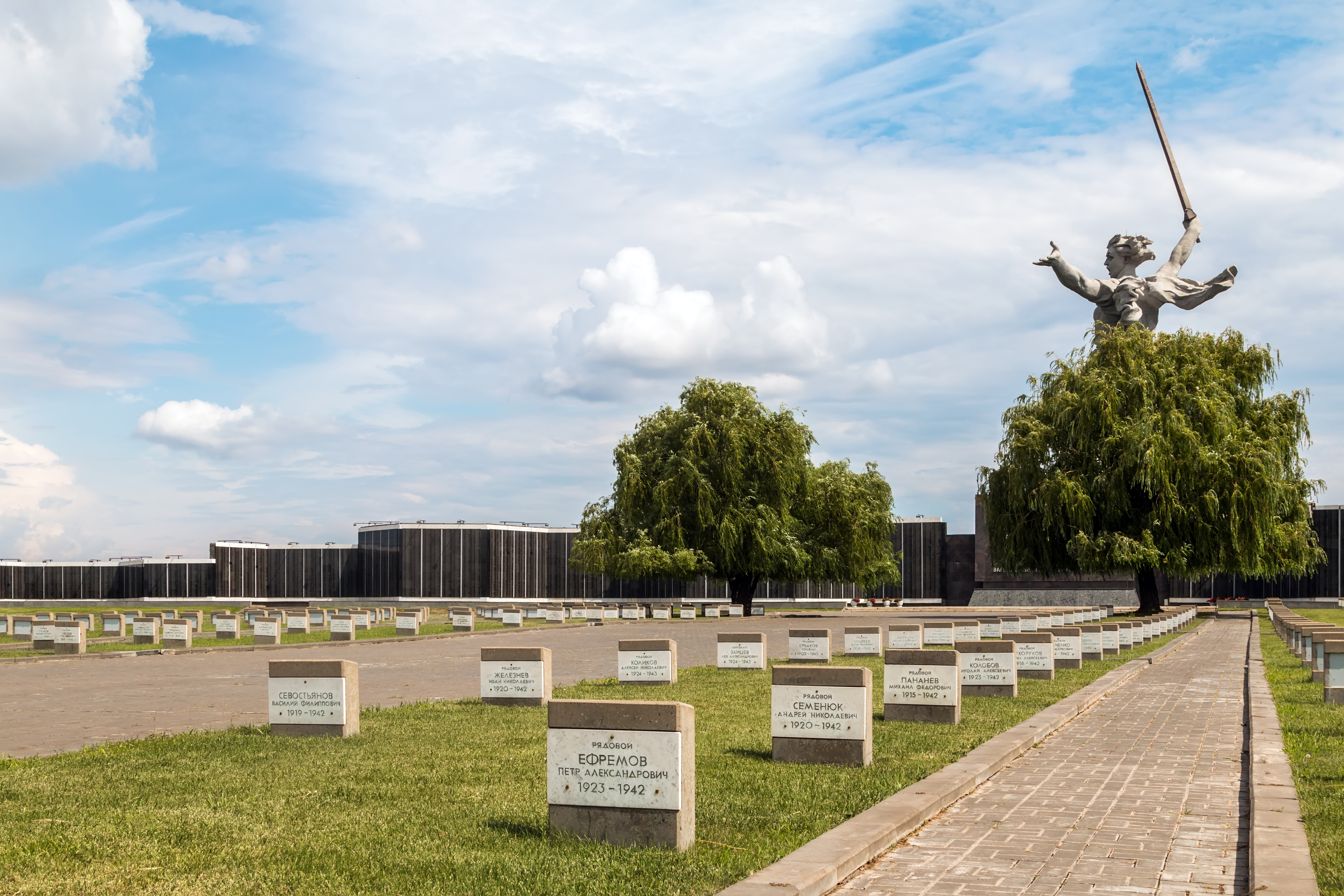
Memorial cemetery of Soviet soldiers

The hall's upper exit leads to the base of a pathway, which in turn zigzags uphill to the Mother Russia Is Calling! statue itself. Also at the hill's base is a third shallow pool, this one surrounding a stone monument named Mother's Sorrow.

The hill itself is an unmarked grave for over 34,500 Russian troops killed at Stalingrad; even this is a tiny percentage of the overall Soviet casualties from the battle. The grass on the hill is considered sacred, and visitors are forbidden to step on it. The top of the hill gives a panoramic view of the city of Volgograd.

Mamayev Kurgan is open to the public 24 hours a day, and there is no charge for admission.

== Background ==
The monumental memorial was constructed between 1959 and 1967, and is crowned by a huge allegorical statue of the Motherland on the top of the hill. The monument, designed by Yevgeny Vuchetich, has the full name The Motherland Calls! (Russian: Родина-мать зовёт! Rodina Mat Zovyot!). It consists of a concrete sculpture, 52 meters tall, and 85 meters from the feet to the tip of the 27-meters sword, dominating the skyline of the city of Stalingrad (later renamed Volgograd).

The construction uses concrete, except for the stainless-steel blade of the sword, and is held on its plinth solely by its own weight. The statue is evocative of classical Greek representations of Nike, in particular the flowing drapery, similar to that of the Nike of Samothrace.

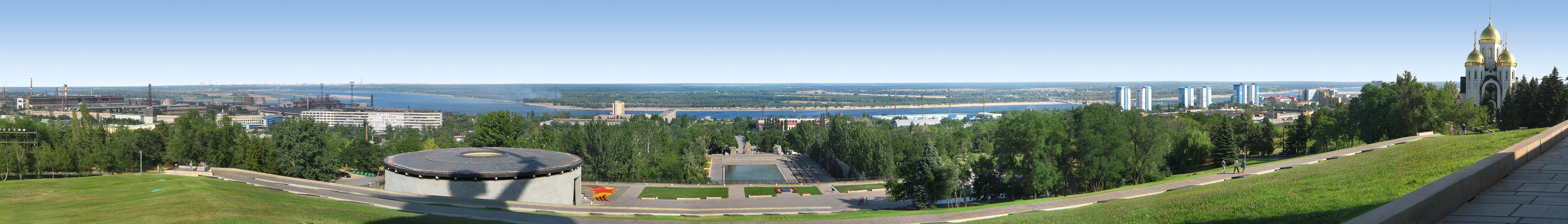
Picture taken from the top of Mamayev Kurgan (at the base of the statue), looking down over the Volga river

== See also ==
- Museum of the Great Patriotic War, Kyiv
- Mound of Glory
