= Yakov Belopolsky =

Soviet architect

Yakov Borisovich Belopolsky
- Яков Борисович Белопольский; Яків Борисович Білопільський
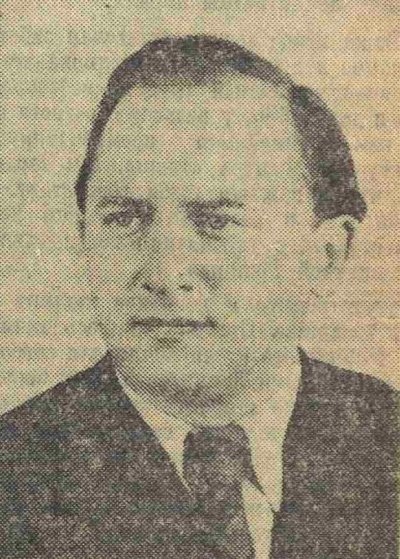
- Belopolsky in 1950
- Born: 23 April 1916; Kiev, Russian Empire (now Kyiv, Ukraine)
- Died: 5 May 1993 (aged 77); Moscow, Russian Federation
- Occupation: Architect
- Awards: People's Architect of the USSR (1988)

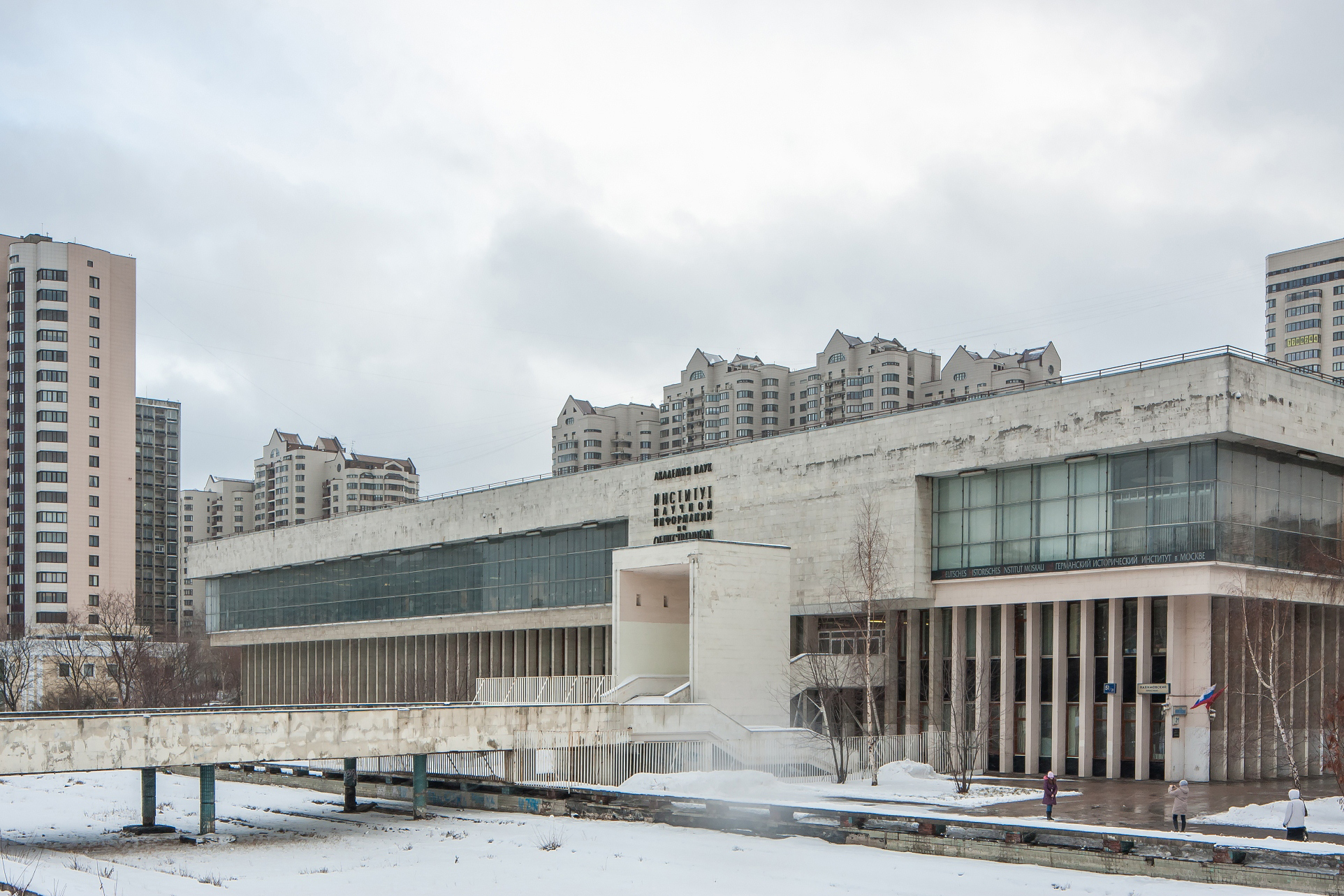
Institute of Scientific Information on Social Sciences of the Russian Academy of Sciences

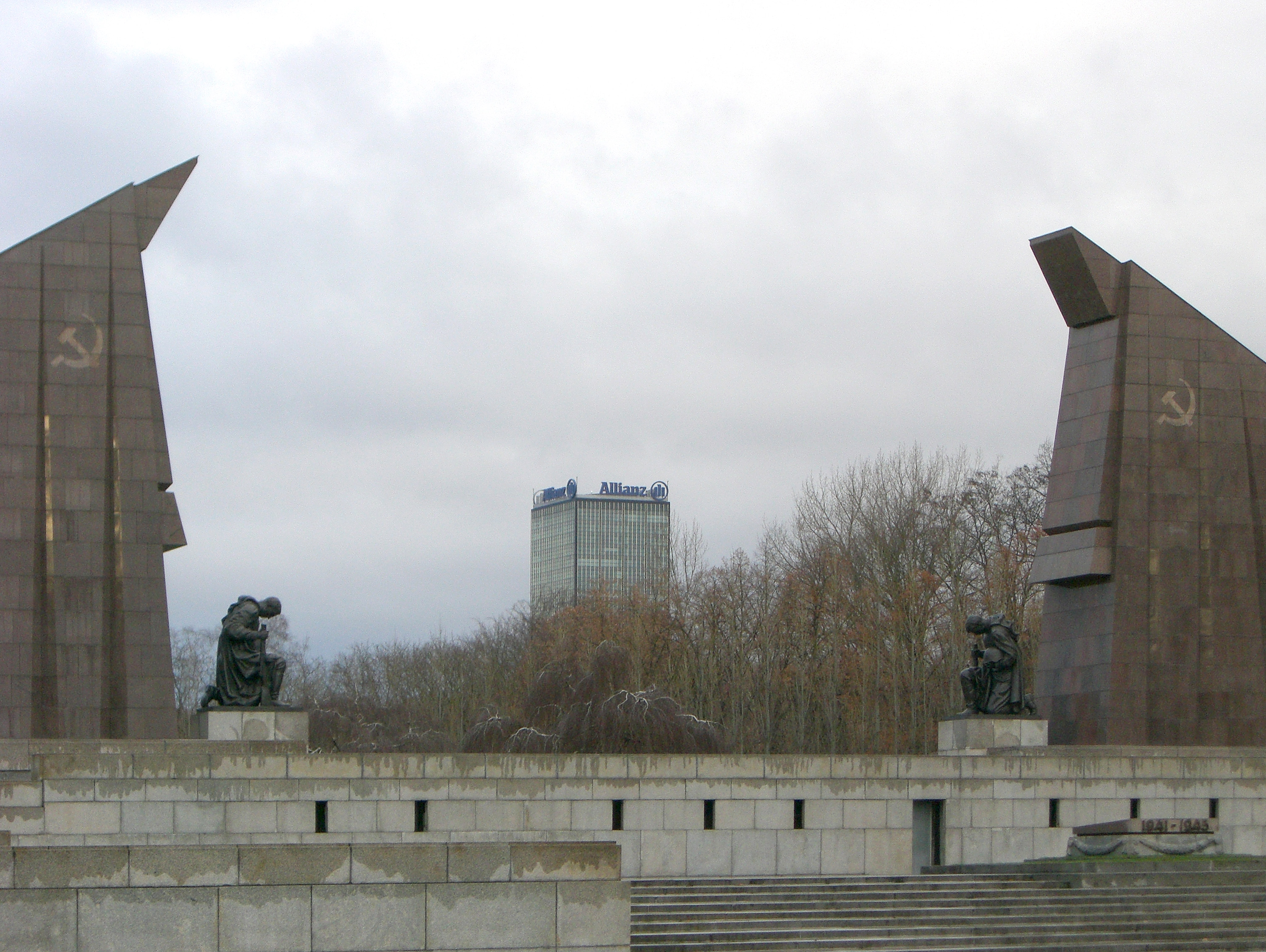
Soviet War Memorial in Treptower Park, Berlin.

Yakov Borisovich Belopolski (Russian: Яков Борисович Белопольский; Ukrainian: Яків Борисович Білопільський, romanized: Yakiv Borysovych Bilopilskyi) was a Soviet architect.

Among other work, he was responsible for the design of the Soviet War Memorial in Treptower Park in Berlin. He was awarded the Stalin Prize in 1950, and was granted the title of People's Architect of the USSR in 1988.

== Literature ==
- Berkovich, Gary. Reclaiming a History. Jewish Architects in Imperial Russia and the USSR. Volume 4. Modernized Socialist Realism: 1955–1991. Weimar und Rostock: Grunberg Verlag. 2022 ISBN 978-3-933713-65-0.
